= NPR Music =

American music radio project

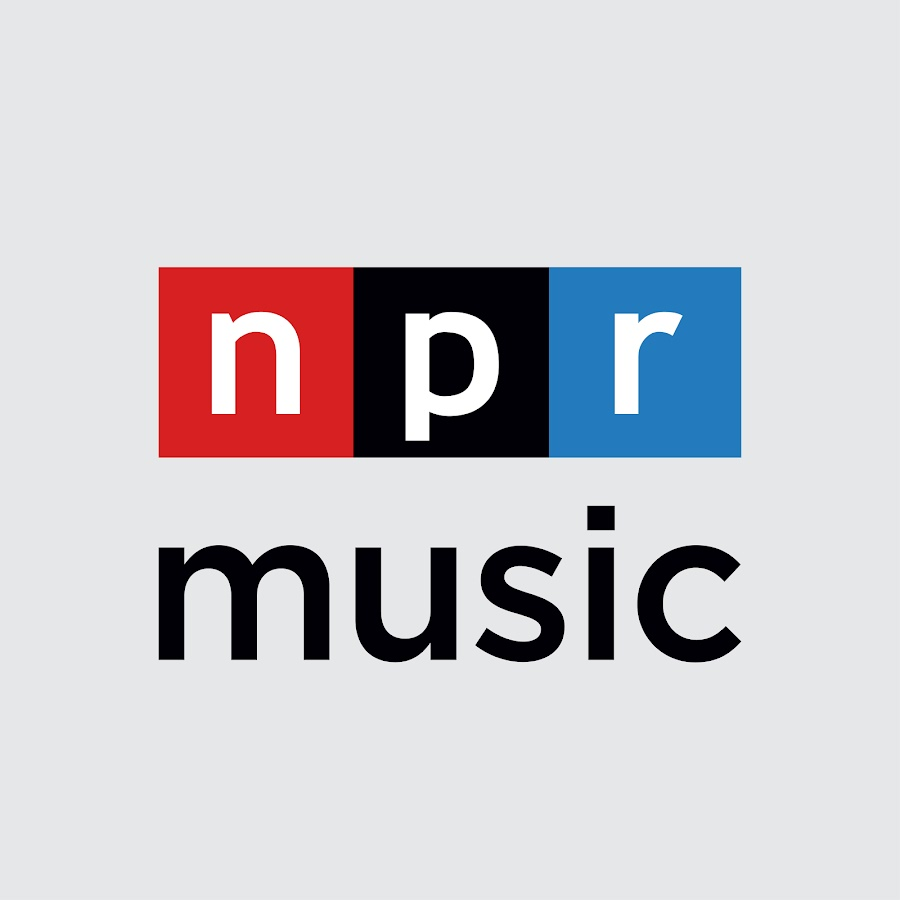
The logo used by NPR Music's YouTube channel

NPR Music is a project of National Public Radio, an American privately and publicly funded non-profit membership media organization, that launched in November 2007 to present public radio music programming and original editorial content for music discovery. NPR Music offers current and archival podcasts, live concert webcasts, reviews, music lists, news, studio sessions, and interviews to listen to from NPR and partner public radio stations across the country, as well as an index of public radio music stations streaming live on the Internet. There have been two blogs: "Monitor Mix" (now defunct) by Sleater-Kinney musician Carrie Brownstein and the All Songs Considered Blog by Bob Boilen and Robin Hilton.

== Programming ==
=== Programs available to hear at NPR Music ===
- All Songs Considered, hosted by Robin Hilton
- Alt.Latino, hosted by Anamaria Sayre and Felix Contreras
- From the Top, hosted by Peter Dugan
- JazzSet, hosted by Dee Dee Bridgewater
- Mountain Stage, hosted by Kathy Mattea, Virginia Public Broadcasting
- Piano Jazz, hosted by Marian McPartland
- World Cafe, hosted by Raina Douris, WXPN
- NPR World of Opera, hosted by Lisa Simeone

=== Podcasts available at NPR Music ===
- All Songs Considered, hosted by Robin Hilton
- Alt.Latino, hosted by Anamaria Sayre and Felix Contreras
- NPR Music Podcast
- World Cafe Words & Music, hosted by Talia Schlanger, WXPN
- World Cafe Next, hosted by David Dye, WXPN
- Jazz Profiles, hosted by Nancy Wilson
- Piano Jazz Shorts, hosted by Marian McPartland
- The Thistle & Shamrock, Celtic music hosted by Fiona Ritchie

=== Live Concert Series ===
- Live Concerts from All Songs Considered, webcasting live from the 9:30 Club in Washington, D.C., and other venues
- Live From The Village Vanguard
- Discoveries at Walt Disney Concert Hall
- Classics in Concert
- Live From South by Southwest
- Live From The Newport Folk Festival
- Live From The Newport Jazz Festival
- XPN Live Fridays
- Mountain Stage
- Toast of the Nation
- Live From The Monterey Jazz Festival
- Tiny Desk Concerts, a video series of live performances by artists at the NPR Music office
- Studio Sessions, videos of performances by artists from media partners and member stations
- Field Recordings, videos of performances by musicians in unconventional locations from media partners and member stations
