= Reuben and the Dark =

Canadian indie folk band

- Origin: Calgary, Alberta, Canada
- Genres: Indie folk; alternative
- Years active: 2012–present
- Label: Arts & Crafts
- Spinoffs: Reuben and the Bullhorn Singers
- Members: Reuben Bullock; Sam Harrison; Brock Geiger; Nathan da Silva; Dino Soares
- Website: reubenandthedark.com

Reuben and the Dark are a Canadian indie folk band from Calgary. Led by singer and songwriter Reuben Bullock, the band also currently includes Sam Harrison (guitar/keys/vocals), Brock Geiger (guitar/keys/vocals), Nathan da Silva (bass/vocals), and Brendan 'Dino' Soares (drums).

== History ==
Bullock released the solo albums Pulling Up Arrows in 2010 and Man Made Lakes in 2012 before deciding to adopt a band name. The band signed to Arts & Crafts Productions in 2013.

The full band's debut album, Funeral Sky, produced by Christopher Hayden of Florence and the Machine and Stephen Kozmeniuk, was released on Arts & Crafts in 2014. The album was supported by a concert tour of both Canada and the United States, as well as a smaller follow-up tour of Western Canada.

In 2016, they released the single "Heart in Two", and toured North America as an opening act for Vance Joy. "Heart in Two" reached #1 on CBC Radio 2's Radio 2 Top 20 chart the week of February 12, 2016.

In 2018, the band released their second album Arms of a Dream, as well as a cover of The Tragically Hip's "Bobcaygeon" as a charity single to benefit the Gord Downie and Chanie Wenjack Fund. During the tour for the Arms of a Dream album across Canada, the band's tour bus crashed on the Trans-Canada Highway near to Banff National Park. Whilst the vehicles were written off, the band members only suffered slight injuries and were able to continue their tour, even though some of their instruments were damaged beyond repair.

In February 2019, the band released a stand-alone digital single "Hold Me Like A Fire" along with a collaboration video produced by the National Music Centre during their artist in residence program. On October 25, 2019, the band released their third album un love. Also in 2019, their song Black Water, from the album Funeral Sky, was featured in the trailer for El Camino: A Breaking Bad Movie. The band also contributed a cover of What a Wonderful World for the soundtrack of the 2020 film Dolittle.

=== Reuben and the Bullhorn Singers ===
In 2024, the band collaborated with Bullhorn Singers, a Kainai band led by Iskotoah'ka William (Billy) Wadsworth, to release "Powerful", a song about reconciliation between Indigenous and non-Indigenous Canadians that was credited to Reuben and the Bullhorn Singers. The song was longlisted for the Polaris SOCAN Song Prize at the 2025 Polaris Music Prize.

In March 2025, Reuben and the Bullhorn Singers announced the release of the EP All These Roads. Reuben and the Bullhorn Singers also recorded music for the preview trailer to Martin Scorsese's 2023 film Killers of the Flower Moon.

In 2026 Reuben and the Dark played a show in Moncton, New Brunswick, and Jay Crocker was in attendance.

== Discography ==
=== Reuben Bullock ===
- Pulling Up Arrows (2010)
- Man Made Lakes (2012)

=== Reuben and the Dark ===
- Funeral Sky (2014)
- Arms of a Dream (2018)
- un love (stylised as un|love) (2019)
- In Lieu of Light (2022)

=== Reuben and the Bullhorn Singers ===
- All These Roads (2025)
