= Saroja Coelho =

Canadian radio personality

- Occupation: radio personality
- Known for: Mornings

Saroja Coelho is a Canadian journalist and radio personality, currently the weekend host of Mornings on CBC Music, the call-in show Just Asking on CBC Radio One, and the CBC Radio Overnight block.

Originally from Toronto, Ontario, Coelho was a foreign correspondent, reporting from Asia and Eastern Europe for CBC, BBC, NPR, Deutsche Welle and National Geographic. In 2012, she became the host of Living Planet on Deutsche Welle, before returning to Canada to host Breakaway, the local afternoon program for CBC Radio One's Quebec Community Network in 2016. She returned to Toronto in 2018, where she was a regular guest host of Here and Now during Gill Deacon's health leave, and became host of Mornings after Raina Douris left the program in 2019.

Just Asking, a weekly call-in show on lifestyle topics such as health, careers and investment, debuted on CBC Radio One in February 2024 on Saturday afternoons. First introduced as a one-hour show, it was later expanded to two hours to align with the older call-in show, Cross Country Checkup, in the equivalent timeslot on Sundays.

Coelho studied biology and political science at the University of Toronto, and was a coordinator of Women Active, Vocal, Effective and Strong, a leadership program for young girls, in the early 2000s.
