= Angeline Tetteh-Wayoe =

Canadian radio personality

- Occupation: radio personality
- Known for: Weekend Mornings, CBC Music Top 20

Angeline Tetteh-Wayoe is a Canadian radio personality, currently a host on the CBC Music network as of October 2016.

A graduate of the radio and television broadcast arts program at the Northern Alberta Institute of Technology, Tetteh-Wayoe worked for CIBK-FM in Calgary and CFXJ-FM in Toronto before joining the CBC. In her commercial radio career, she was known by the on-air name Miss Ange. She remained with CFXJ until it rebranded from Flow 93.5 to The Move in early 2016, and was then an occasional guest host on Radio 2 Morning until being named the new permanent weekend host in October following the departure of Talia Schlanger.

Tetteh-Wayoe's new show, entitled The Block, is a program devoted to Black musical genres such as hip hop, soul and rhythm and blues. It airs every weeknight; the program debuted in February 2021.

Tetteh-Wayoe was the host of the Juno Awards of 2021.
