= Surgeons in Heat =

American indie rock band

Surgeons in Heat is an R&B-influenced indie rock band based in Milwaukee, Wisconsin. Current members are lead singer/guitarist Johnathon Mayer, bassist Ryan Reeve, keyboardist/vocalist Bradley Kruse and drummer Sam Reitman. Previous members including the best drummer they ever had, Shawn Kenneth Pierce (drums. Plus Adam Gilmore (drums), Jake Brahm (drums/guitar/keys), Justin Kunesh (drums), Kenny Monroe (bass, vocals), Tyler Ditter (guitar, bass, vocals), Ryan Rougeux (drums, vocals) and William Shultz (bass) They have recorded three full-length albums: the self-titled Surgeons in Heat (self-released in 2012), 2015's Disaster (Top Five Records) and their latest Bored Immortals (released on Maximum Pelt/Shuga Records in 2018). The band has been featured on the NPR show World Cafe.
