= Glueleg =

Canadian alternative rock band

- Origin: Toronto, Ontario, Canada
- Genres: Alternative Rock, Progressive Rock, Hard rock, Art Rock
- Years active: 1990–1998; 2023
- Labels: EMI, Liquid Records, Pure Records, Page Publications
- Members: Carlos Alonso; Christian Simpson
- Past members: Ruben Huizenga; Andrew Charters; Blake Howard; Alex Haird; Bob Mackowycz; Andrew Wyse
- Website: https://glueleg.com/

Glueleg is a Canadian alternative rock band that was formed in 1990 in Toronto, Ontario, Canada. The band released three albums and one EP before disbanding in 1998. In 2023, a newly-reformed version of the band released an album entitled Horror Vacui on multiple streaming platforms.

== History ==
Glueleg was formed by Carlos Alonso, Ruben Huizenga and Blake Howard. They had several hit singles from 1994 to 1997 with the songs Heroic Doses, Come With Me and Mr. Pink off their second and most successful album Heroic Doses produced by James Stewart, recorded at Reaction Studios, Toronto in 1994. And with Pistons, and Dragonfly off their third Sylvia Massy produced album, Clodhopper. The band, led by Chapman Stick player, songwriter and vocalist Alonso and guitar player, songwriter and vocalist Ruben Huizenga broke up in 1998, with the members all going on to different projects.

The band's music consisted of a hard-edged alternative, art-rock sound. The music prominently featured the sounds of Chapman Stick, saxophone and trumpet arranged alongside hard rock guitar and vocal raps. A recording contract with Pure Records and Canadian and US national record distribution through Page Publications gave the band enough exposure to support six national tours with opening spots for I Mother Earth, The Tea Party, and Our Lady Peace as well as performing with other Canadian bands of that era. In 1997, the band signed a distribution deal with EMI.

The band released three albums and one EP: Angst (1991), Park Alien (EP-1993), Heroic Doses (1994) and Clodhopper (1997), the last of which features a guest appearance by fiddle player Ashley MacIsaac. Their career included various performances at Edgefest and five music videos that received considerable airplay in Canada.

In 2021, drummer Christian Simpson announced via social media that the recording of a new Glueleg album was in progress, by a newly-reformed version of the band featuring Simpson and original Chapman Stick player Carlos Alonso. The album, entitled Horror Vacui, produced and mixed by Alonso, was released on multiple streaming platforms in March, 2023 with CD and vinyl formats to be released at a later date. The thematically accompanying EP A Colossus With Clay Feet was released on multiple streaming platforms in September 2023.

== Discography ==
=== EPs ===
- (1993) Park Alien (Independent)
- (2023) A Colossus With Clay Feet (Independent)

=== Albums ===
- (1991) Angst (Independent)
- (1994) Heroic Doses (Independent) (reissued in 1995 on Pure Records)
- (1997) Clodhopper (Liquid Records)
- (2023) Horror Vacui (Independent)
