= CBC Music Top 20 =

Canadian radio record chart program

CBC Music Top 20, formerly Radio 2 Top 20, is a Canadian radio record chart program, which airs across Canada on the CBC Music network. Hosted by Grant Lawrence, the show counts down the week's top songs played on the network's daily adult album alternative programs Mornings and Drive, as determined by a mix of Canadian record sales and listener voting feedback.

The show premiered in August 2012. It was previously hosted by Garvia Bailey, Pete Morey, Nana aba Duncan and Angeline Tetteh-Wayoe.

The show also aired on CBC Radio One in fall 2016, but was dropped from that service's winter 2017 schedule.
