= Un love =

2019 studio album by Reuben and the Dark

un love

Studio album by Reuben and the Dark
- Released: October 2019
- Genre: Folk rock, indie rock, alt rock
- Label: Arts & Crafts
- Producer: Marcus Paquin, Kevin Drew

Reuben and the Dark chronology
| Arms of a Dream (2018) | un love (2019) | In Lieu of Light (2022) |

Professional ratings
Review scores
| Source | Rating |
|---|---|
| Exclaim! | 6/10 stars |

un love is the third album from Canadian indie folk band, Reuben and the Dark. The album was released barely 18 months after its predecessor, Arms of a Dream. Besides being described as indie rock and folk-rock, some reviewers began describing the band as alternative rock.

== Background ==
The album was demoed in Mexico with Reuben Bullock, bassist Ian Jarvis, guitarist Brock Geiger and Christopher Hayden as the producer. Bullock had gone to Mexico after touring the 2018 album Arms of a Dream and after separating from his wife. He said about the album; "Me and my wife separated and I've been in that process of trying to understand our relationship and change our understanding of love. That has had a really deep effect on me and that's at the heart of all these songs, me trying to understand love to be really blunt about it."

The song Faultline was originally demoed for the album Arms of a Dream, but never made it onto that album.

== Critical reception ==
Killbeatmusic described the album as "..[the] collection is a bare, cathartic exploration of life's undeniable crossroads, and the fateful depths that await there." Exclaim! were not as effusive with this album compared with its predecessor. They said of the album; "The scope of the band's music has shrunk. Unexpected flourishes that gave their flowery compositions a few thorns have been pruned back in favour of safer music."

== Track listing ==
| No. | Title | Length |
|---|---|---|
| 1. | "Rising" | 5:03 |
| 2. | "Faultline" | 4:07 |
| 3. | "Welcome Home" | 3:21 |
| 4. | "Weightlessness" | 5:38 |
| 5. | "Breathe" | 3:50 |
| 6. | "Underground" | 1:16 |
| 7. | "Inner River" | 4:55 |
| 8. | "Unlove" | 4:16 |
| 9. | "Outrun the Rain" | 3:57 |
| 10. | "Wisemen" | 4:35 |
| 11. | "Dancer" | 3:47 |
| Total length: | | 44:45 |

== Personnel ==
- Reuben Bullock – vocals, guitar
- Shea Alain – guitar, keyboards
- Brock Geiger – guitar, keyboards
- Ian Jarvis – bass
- Brendan Soares – drums
