= Mornings (CBC Music) =

Radio program

- Genre: music
- Country of origin: Canada
- Language(s): English
- Home station: CBC Radio Two
- Starring: Damhnait Doyle (M-F); Saroja Coelho (Sat-Sun)
- Original release: September 2, 2008 – present

Mornings, titled Weekend Mornings on Saturday and Sunday, is the morning program on the CBC Music radio network in Canada. The program features a cross-genre selection of selected new and old Canadian and international singer/songwriter, rock and pop tracks. It also presents anecdotes, overnight news stories, and background information on the music.

The program airs from 6 a.m. to 9 a.m. seven days a week, and premiered in 2008 as part of the network's revamp. Known as Radio 2 Morning and Radio 2 Weekend Morning until the network's rebranding as CBC Music in 2018, it was originally hosted by Tom Allen weekdays and Molly Johnson weekends. Allen left the program in 2009 to become host of Shift, and was succeeded by Bob Mackowycz as weekday host; in 2011, Mackowycz left the program and was succeeded by Tom Power. Johnson left as weekend host in December 2013, and was succeeded by Talia Schlanger in January.

In August 2016, the CBC announced that Power would be leaving the program to become host of the network's entertainment magazine show Q; around the same time, Schlanger left the program to take a job as contributing producer for the NPR music series World Cafe in the United States. In September, the network announced Raina Douris as the new weekday host, and Angeline Tetteh-Wayoe as the new weekend host.

Douris left in September 2019, and was succeeded by Saroja Coelho. In 2021, after Tetteh-Wayoe moved to the network's new weekday evening program The Block, the weekend show was taken over by Daniel Greaves on Saturdays and Damhnait Doyle on Sundays. Greaves later left the show, with Doyle taking over both days; in February 2024, when Coelho launched the new Just Asking on CBC Radio One, Doyle also took over hosting the show on Mondays, with Coelho remaining the Tuesday through Friday host. In September, after Just Asking was expanded from one hour to two, Doyle became the full-time weekday host, with Coelho becoming the weekend host.

The program's production staff is based at the Canadian Broadcasting Centre in Toronto; however, Power, who is originally from St. John's, occasionally hosted from the CBC's facilities in that city.
