= El Camino: A Breaking Bad Movie =

2019 American film by Vince Gilligan

- Promotional poster
- Directed by: Vince Gilligan
- Written by: Vince Gilligan
- Based on: Breaking Bad by Vince Gilligan
- Produced by: Mark Johnson; Melissa Bernstein; Charles Newirth; Vince Gilligan; Aaron Paul
- Starring: Aaron Paul; Jesse Plemons; Krysten Ritter; Charles Baker; Matt Jones; Robert Forster; Jonathan Banks; Bryan Cranston
- Cinematography: Marshall Adams
- Edited by: Skip Macdonald
- Music by: Dave Porter
- Production companies: Sony Pictures Television; Gran Vía Productions; High Bridge Productions
- Distributed by: Netflix; Sony Pictures Releasing
- Release date: October 11, 2019
- Running time: 122 minutes
- Country: United States
- Language: English
- Budget: >$6 million
- Box office: >$40,000

El Camino: A Breaking Bad Movie (or simply El Camino) is a 2019 American neo-Western and crime thriller film. Part of the Breaking Bad franchise, it serves as a sequel and epilogue to the television series Breaking Bad. It continues the story of Jesse Pinkman, who partnered with former teacher Walter White throughout the series to build a crystal meth empire based in Albuquerque, New Mexico. Series creator Vince Gilligan wrote, directed, and co-produced El Camino in his feature length directorial debut, while Aaron Paul reprised his role as Jesse Pinkman. Several Breaking Bad actors also reprised their roles, including Jesse Plemons, Krysten Ritter, Charles Baker, Matt Jones, Robert Forster, Jonathan Banks, and Bryan Cranston. Forster died on the day of the film's release, making it one of his final on-screen appearances.

Gilligan began considering the story of El Camino while writing Breaking Bad's series finale. He approached Paul with the idea for the film in 2017, near the tenth anniversary of the show's premiere, and completed the script several months later. Principal photography began in secret in New Mexico in November 2018, lasting nearly 50 days. The project remained unconfirmed until Netflix released a trailer on August 24, 2019.

El Camino received a digital release on Netflix and a limited theatrical run on October 11, 2019, with an AMC television premiere on February 16, 2020. It drew positive reviews from critics and garnered several award nominations, winning Best Movie Made for Television at the Critics' Choice Television Awards and Best Motion Picture Made for Television at the Satellite Awards. El Camino additionally gained four nominations at the Primetime Creative Arts Emmy Awards for Outstanding Television Movie and other technical categories.

== Plot ==
In a flashback to shortly before they leave Walter White's meth business, (Note: During the events of "Buyout" and "Say My Name", set around early 2010.) Jesse Pinkman asks Mike Ehrmantraut where he would go to start over. Mike says if he were younger, he would go to Alaska, which Jesse finds appealing. Jesse expresses the desire to make amends for past wrongdoing, but Mike warns that starting over would make that impossible.

In the present day, Jesse flees the Brotherhood compound in Todd Alquist's El Camino. (Note: As depicted in "Felina".) He goes to the Albuquerque home of Skinny Pete and Badger, who hide the car and give Jesse a place to sleep. The next morning, Jesse calls Old Joe to dispose of the El Camino, but Joe leaves after discovering its LoJack. Pete devises a plan to make it appear Jesse fled after trading the El Camino for Pete's Ford Thunderbird. Pete and Badger give Jesse the money Walter gave them, and Badger drives south in the Thunderbird so it appears Jesse is headed to Mexico. Pete stays with the El Camino and waits for police to respond to the LoJack. Jesse departs in Badger's Pontiac Fiero. He learns from the radio news of Walter's fatal poisoning of a woman, (Note: Identified offscreen as Lydia Rodarte-Quayle.) and of Walter's death.

In a flashback to Jesse's captivity, (Note: After the events of "Granite State".) Todd takes Jesse to Todd's apartment to help dispose of his cleaning lady, whom he killed after she discovered his hidden money. They sidestep Lou Schanzer, Todd's busybody neighbor, and bury the corpse in the Painted Desert. Jesse briefly holds the pistol Todd left unsecured, but Todd talks him into returning it.

In the present day, Jesse searches Todd's apartment. He finds the new hiding place for Todd's money, but policemen Neil Kandy and Casey enter and begin searching. Jesse hides but holds Casey at gunpoint after Casey finds him. Neil disarms Jesse, who realizes they are not police but thugs also looking for Todd's money. To save himself, Jesse reveals he found the cash. Lou reports finding an old note from Todd, and Casey distracts him by feigning interest. Neil and Jesse bargain over the cash; to avoid alarming neighbors, Neil lets Jesse take a third. As they depart, Jesse recognizes Neil as the welder who built the tether that held him while he was forced to cook meth for the Brotherhood.

Jesse finds Ed Galbraith, the "disappearer," who wants $125,000 to aid Jesse, plus $125,000 for the previous occasion when Jesse hired him but failed to commit. (Note: As depicted in "Confessions".) Jesse is $1,800 short and Ed refuses to help. Knowing his parents are being surveilled, Jesse calls them and feigns willingness to surrender. After his parents and the police depart, Jesse sneaks into the Pinkman home and takes two pistols from his father's safe, a Colt Woodsman and an Iver Johnson Hammerless.

Jesse drives to Neil's shop, where Neil, Casey, and three friends celebrate with escorts and cocaine. After the escorts leave, he asks for $1,800, and Neil refuses. Seeing the Woodsman in Jesse's waistband, Neil challenges him to a duel for his share of the cash. Jesse agrees and when Neil reaches for his gun, Jesse shoots him with the Hammerless, which was concealed in his jacket pocket. Casey fires at Jesse, but Jesse kills him with Neil's gun. Jesse collects the driver's licenses of the remaining men and lets them leave after threatening to return and kill them if they notify police. He recovers Neil's cash and departs after setting an explosion to cover his tracks.

In a flashback, (Note: During the events of "4 Days Out".) Walter and Jesse have breakfast after a multi-day meth cook. Estimating they will make more than $1 million, Walt laments not doing something "special" sooner and calls Jesse lucky for not having to wait.

In the present day, Ed drops Jesse off at a car parked near Haines, Alaska. Jesse gives Ed a letter for Brock Cantillo and acknowledges he does not want to say goodbye to anyone else. Driving off, Jesse has a flashback to his time with Jane Margolis. (Note: Set after the events of the cold open flashback in "Abiquiu".) He tells her he admires what she said about going wherever the universe takes her, but she dismisses it as metaphorical and encourages him to make his own decisions. Jesse drives on, smiling at the prospect of a new life.

== Cast ==
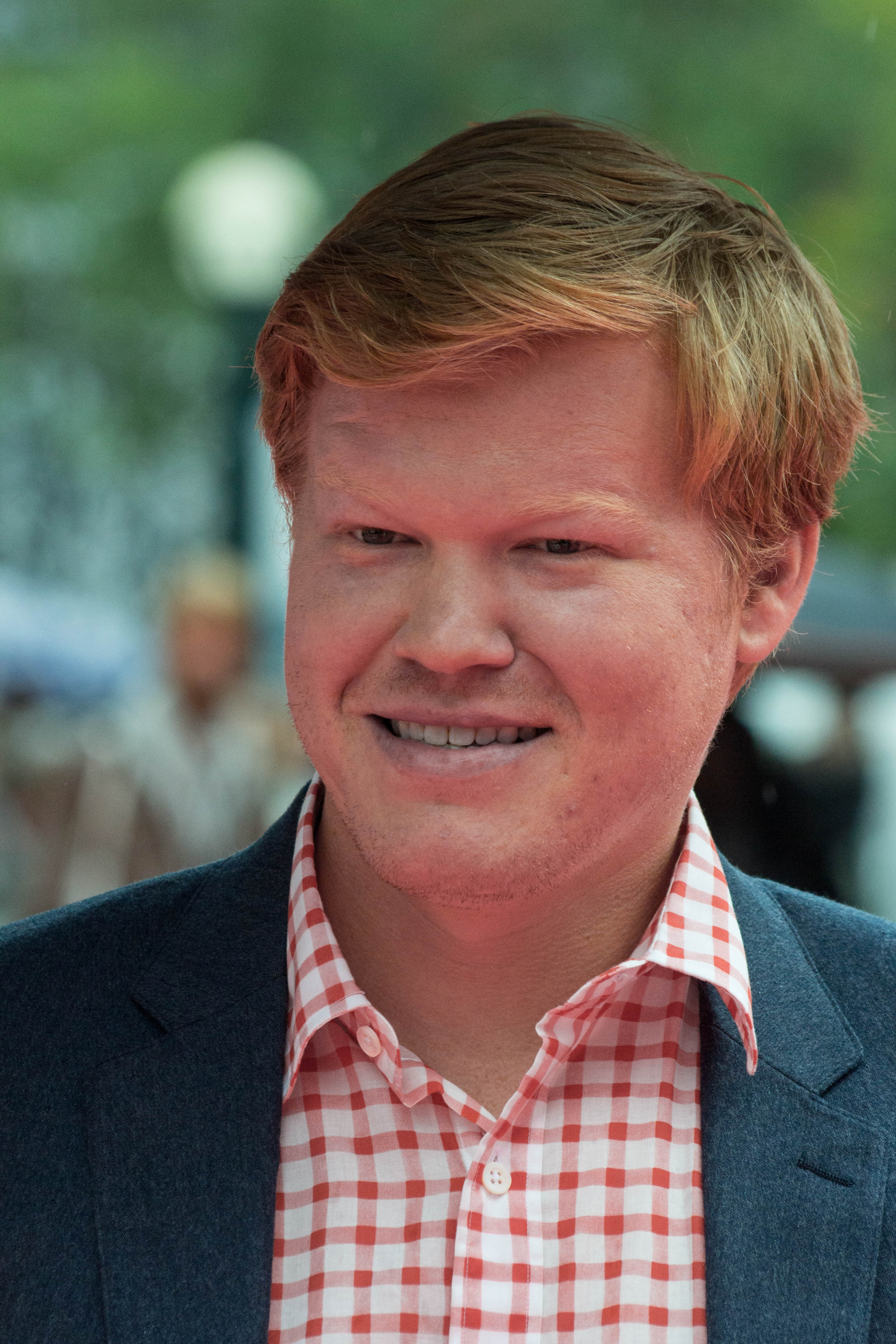
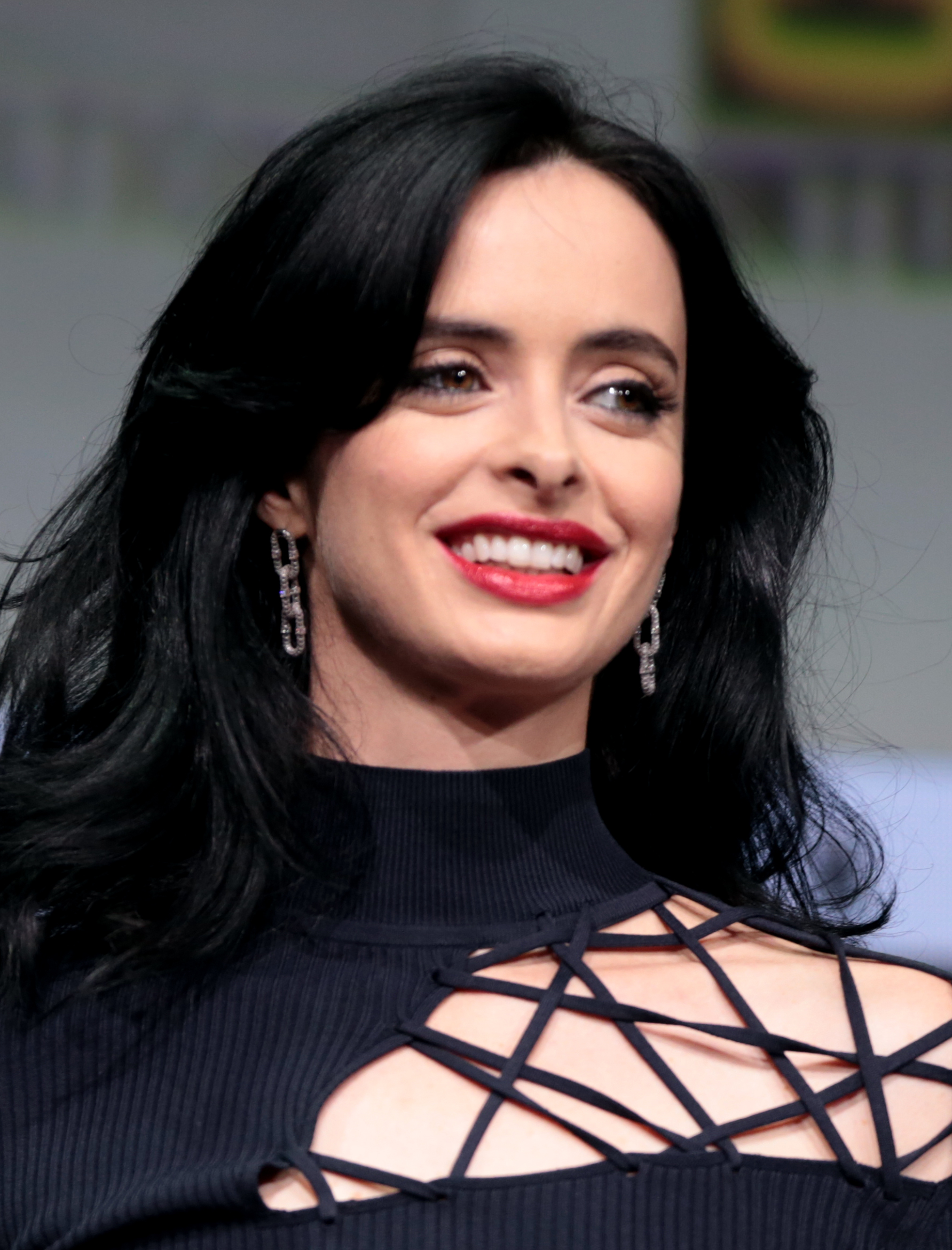
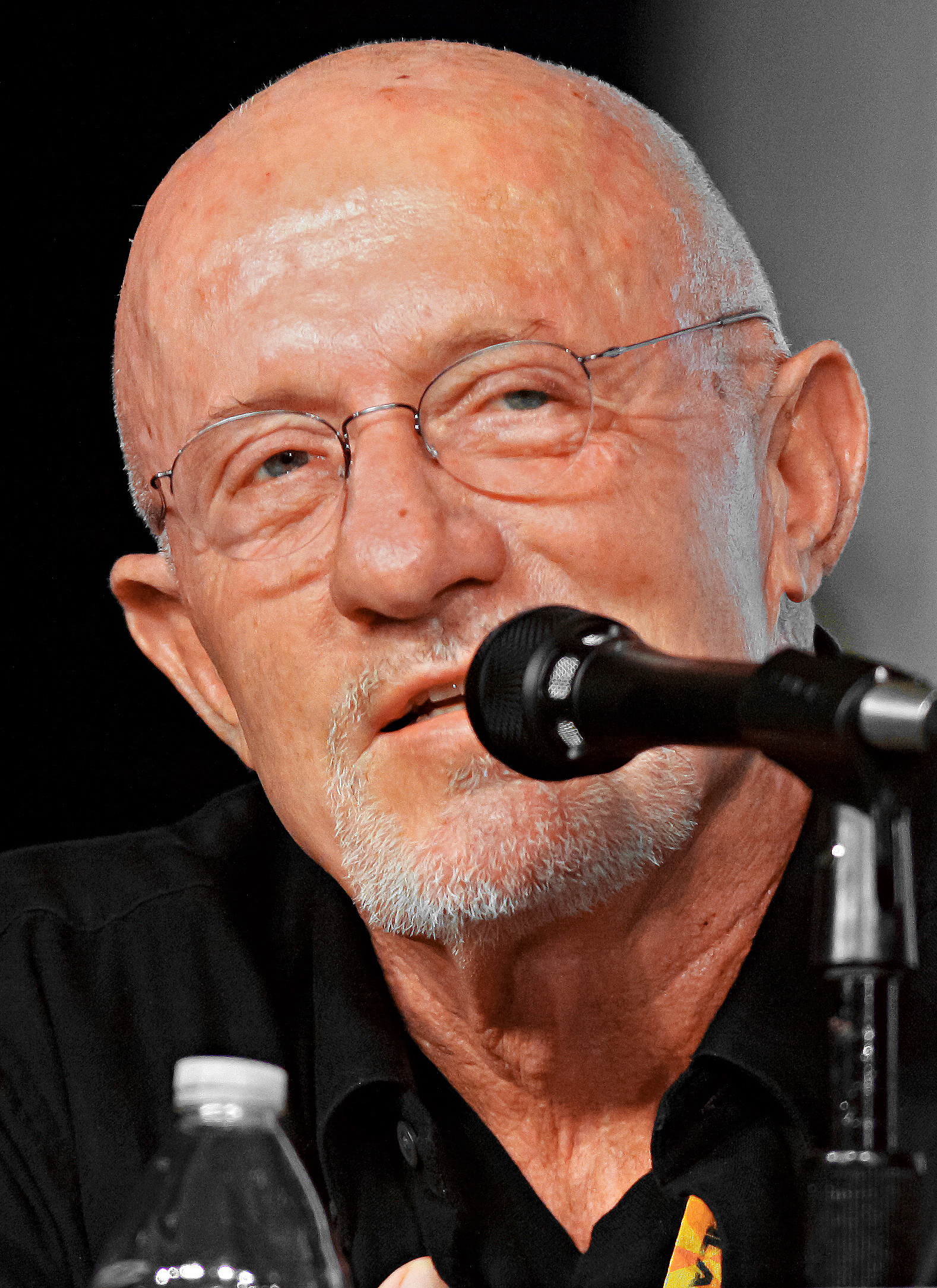
Jesse Plemons, Krysten Ritter, and Jonathan Banks reprised their roles as Todd Alquist, Jane Margolis, and Mike Ehrmantraut, respectively.
- Aaron Paul as Jesse Pinkman, a former meth cook who once partnered with Walter White
- Jesse Plemons as Todd Alquist, one of Jesse's captors and a member of the neo-Nazi gang that forces Jesse to cook meth, who appears in flashbacks before his death
- Krysten Ritter as Jane Margolis, Jesse's deceased girlfriend, who appears in a flashback
- Charles Baker as Skinny Pete, Jesse's friend
- Matt Jones as Brandon "Badger" Mayhew, Jesse's friend
- Robert Forster as Ed Galbraith, a vacuum cleaner store owner who has a side business as a criminal extractor relocating and giving them new identities
- Jonathan Banks as Mike Ehrmantraut, former business partner of Jesse and Walter, who appears in a flashback
- Bryan Cranston as Walter White, meth kingpin, and Jesse's deceased former partner and high school chemistry teacher, who appears in a flashback
- Scott MacArthur as Neil Kandy, a welder involved in Jesse's captivity
- Scott Shepherd as Casey, Neil's associate
- Tom Bower as Lou Schanzer, Todd's nosy neighbor
- Kevin Rankin as Kenny, one of Jesse's captors
- Larry Hankin as Old Joe, the owner of a local junkyard who previously helped Jesse and Walter with several activities connected to their meth business
- Tess Harper as Diane Pinkman, Jesse's mother who has a strained relationship with her son
- Michael Bofshever as Adam Pinkman, Jesse's father who has a strained relationship with his son
- Marla Gibbs as Jean, an Albuquerque resident seen shopping at Best Quality Vacuum
- Brendan Sexton III as Kyle, an employee at Kandy Welding Co.
- Cody Renee Cameron as Candy, an escort hired by Neil
- Alison Law as Wanda, an escort hired by Neil
- Gabriela Alicia Ortega as April, an escort hired by Neil
- Johnny Ortiz as Busboy, who appears in a flashback serving Jesse and Walter's table at Owl Café
- Todd Terry as Austin Ramey, Special Agent in Charge of the El Paso division of the Drug Enforcement Administration (DEA).
- Julie Pearl as Suzanne Ericsen, Assistant District Attorney of Bernalillo County.
- David Mattey as Clarence / Man Mountain, who appears dropping off the women at Kandy Welding Co.

== Themes and style ==
While El Camino's plot focuses on Jesse Pinkman escaping to Alaska, producer Melissa Bernstein stated that thematically, the film centers on Jesse's transformation from a boy to a man. Alan Sepinwall of Rolling Stone noted the prevalence of this theme in the flashbacks that bookend El Camino, with Mike Ehrmantraut at the beginning, and Walter White and Jane Margolis at the end. He detailed that while these scenes serve as a reminder of who Jesse used to be and all that he lost, "all three flashbacks are also about the way that Jesse has been forced by tragic circumstance to grow up and think more about his place in the universe and the impact he has on others. And they're about setting him on the road where Ed [Galbraith] leaves him at the film's conclusion". Donna Bowman of The A.V. Club traced Jesse's stunted growth to the events of Breaking Bad, mentioning that he had gone from a "dead-eyed kid" to someone whose ambitions and livelihood were perverted by Walter White. However, Bowman noted that in freeing himself from White's influence, Jesse was able to avoid his mentor's fate and finally give himself a chance for a future.

Sepinwall further stated that the opening flashback with Jesse and Mike also sets the theme of Jesse wanting to start over while also making things right with his past. Though Mike warned that making amends would be impossible, Sepinwall noted that Jesse was able to repay several emotional debts from the series with rectifying gestures throughout the film: giving a proper goodbye to his friends Badger and Skinny Pete, apologizing to his parents one last time, getting revenge against Neil Kandy and Casey, paying back his literal debt to Ed Galbraith, and sending his farewell letter of apology to Brock Cantillo. Placing his own analysis on Jesse's final duel with Neil, writer and director Vince Gilligan interpreted the scene as more than just Jesse getting the cash he needed for his escape, but also as a way of exorcising demons that plagued him from the events of the series. Both Gilligan and Aaron Paul, who portrayed the character, speculated that Jesse would still be haunted by these demons, even in his new life in Alaska, but had at least achieved some form of vengeance for his past by ridding the world of an evil person.

Breaking Bad was often categorized as a contemporary Western; this theme is also present in El Camino. Gilligan expressed his admiration for director Sergio Leone and his love for the Western genre – he originally wanted to film Breaking Bad in the CinemaScope format Leone used for the Dollars Trilogy and got his wish in El Camino. Critics noted the duel between Jesse and Neil as being directly in the style of Western films; Gilligan referenced The Good, the Bad and the Ugly (1966) to give the same feel for that scene. Likewise, composer Dave Porter used Western elements in the film's score as he had in the two television series. Ben Travers of IndieWire traced the film's Western influences to its "sweeping landscapes, lone survivor, and final stand-off", while Matt Zoller Seitz of Vulture called El Camino's title "unabashedly Western-tinged" and cited the final shot's lack of overt sentimentality as being true to the spirit of classic Westerns.

== Production ==
=== Conception ===
Vince Gilligan, the creator and showrunner of Breaking Bad, had the idea for El Camino while writing the series finale "Felina". He asked himself what happened to Jesse Pinkman after the events of the episode when Jesse escaped from the neo-Nazis' compound after being rescued by Walter White. Though he kept Jesse's fate ambiguous in the finale's script, Gilligan offered two possibilities during interviews: a more realistic one where the police caught Jesse a few miles from the compound, and a second, more optimistic one where he got away but still had to cope with the terrible things he witnessed throughout the series.

In the intervening years, Gilligan toyed with approaches for continuing Jesse's story. One early idea involved Jesse hiding close to the Canadian border, getting lured back into crime to help a young woman in the town. This version ended with Jesse in a jail cell in the concluding scene, imprisoned yet at peace for the first time. Gilligan's girlfriend Holly Rice advised against this ending, saying fans would not appreciate seeing Jesse incarcerated after all he had been through. He received the same feedback when separately pitching ideas for the film with the writing staff of Better Call Saul, a Breaking Bad spin-off co-created by Gilligan that was still airing at the time. The staff featured many writers from the original series; Gilligan originally served as co-showrunner during the early seasons before leaving the writers' room to focus on other projects. They also objected to this ending because they planned on using a similar idea for the series finale of Better Call Saul, which was still to come many years later, and felt this conclusion fit their story better than Jesse's. After the negative reception to the concept of Jesse getting caught by authorities, Gilligan subsequently went with the storyline of Jesse escaping to Alaska.

=== Development ===
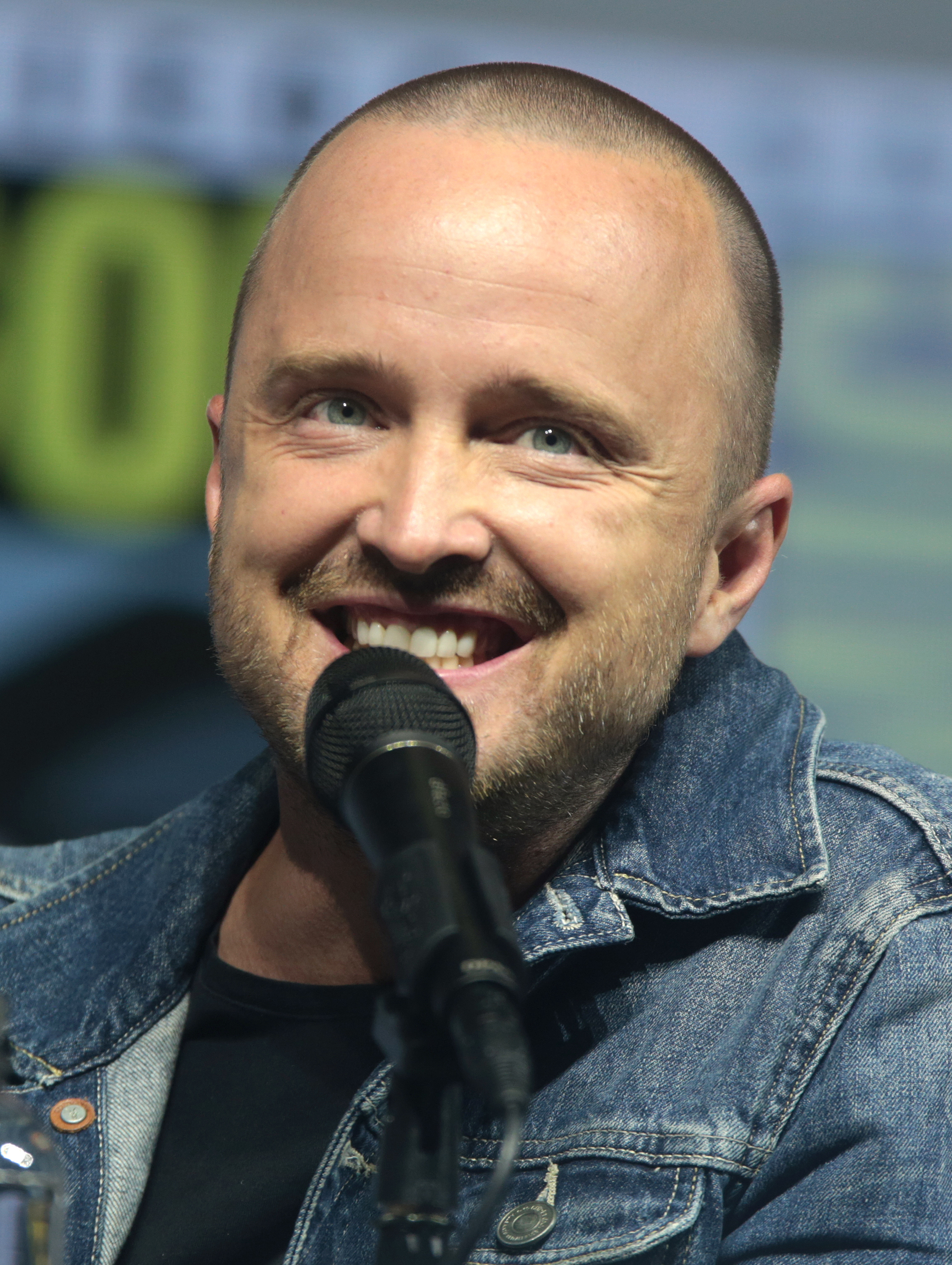
El Camino follows Jesse Pinkman, portrayed by Aaron Paul, after the events of Breaking Bad.

The original idea for continuing Jesse Pinkman's story began as a short film or "mini-episode" of about 15 to 20 minutes in length. Realizing a short would not be cost-effective, Gilligan opted to make a full-length feature film. He initially thought about titling the project '63, referring to its unofficial status as the 63rd episode of Breaking Bad. However, during the meeting where Gilligan pitched story ideas with the Better Call Saul staff, series executive producer Thomas Schnauz advised him to change this proposed title. Schnauz, who served as an executive producer and a writer on both television series, reasoned to Gilligan that Breaking Bad essentially focused on Walter White's story, whereas the film and its title should be unique to reflect that they centered on Jesse Pinkman. Gilligan agreed and eventually settled on the title El Camino, referring to the car Jesse drives away with in "Felina".

Near the tenth anniversary of Breaking Bad's premiere, Gilligan started sharing the idea with former cast and crew members as a means to celebrate the milestone. Aaron Paul, who portrayed Jesse in the series, affirmed that around this time, he received a phone call from Gilligan, who hinted at a return for his character. Paul initially believed this meant a cameo appearance on Better Call Saul, which is a prequel to Breaking Bad. Gilligan then revealed his intentions to continue Jesse's story after the events of the series, much to Paul's excitement. Though he thought Breaking Bad concluded satisfyingly, Paul still felt attached to the character of Jesse Pinkman; fans regularly asked him of Jesse's whereabouts, while he occasionally wondered about Jesse's fate himself. At the end of the conversation, Paul showed eagerness to be involved with any idea Gilligan had for a Breaking Bad continuation.

Gilligan presented Paul with a completed screenplay seven months after proposing his idea. Paul spent three hours in Gilligan's office going over the script and almost instantly felt able to pick up on Jesse's mindset and emotional beats. Following his initial read-through, Paul was impressed to the point that he felt speechless, and likened this reaction to the one after his first reading of "Felina". Once he was finished with the screenplay, Paul continued to express happiness and excitement for the film, which he called a "love letter" to Jesse and Breaking Bad's fans, and lauded Gilligan for approaching the script with caution and care.

Though Gilligan had been involved with feature-length films before, El Camino was the first he directed and produced. While he considered the concept of a sequel film for an extended period after Breaking Bad's conclusion, Gilligan stated he likely would not have been able to make it had Better Call Saul been unsuccessful. When Gilligan made his initial film pitch to Sony Pictures Television, the studio behind both Breaking Bad and Better Call Saul, the executives quickly agreed to come on board. With his script in hand, Gilligan then selectively shopped the film to a few potential distributors, settling on Netflix and AMC due to their history with the show. Gilligan intended El Camino to have a theatrical release, which Netflix had previously provided for some of Breaking Bad's season premieres. El Camino's unspecified budget surpassed the $6 million budget per episode by the end of the show's final season.

=== Writing ===
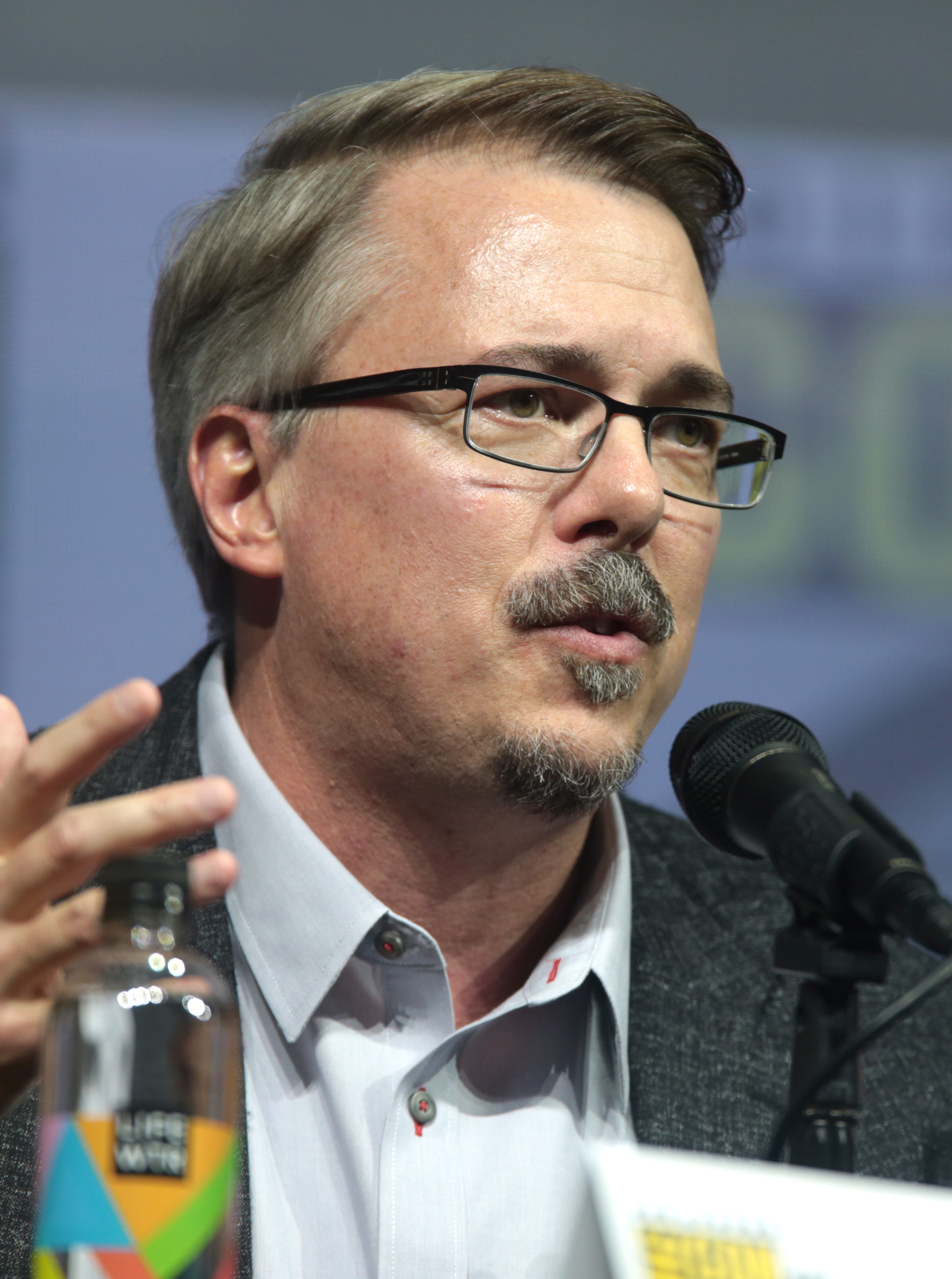
Vince Gilligan, the creator and showrunner of Breaking Bad, wrote and directed El Camino.

Unlike most of his work from The X-Files, Breaking Bad and Better Call Saul, where he collaborated with a writers room to develop his scripts and meet his deadlines, Gilligan wrote the film's screenplay alone until he felt it was ready to present. Regarding El Camino as a coda to Breaking Bad, Gilligan believed the film would primarily appeal to the show's fans and would not be as enjoyable to those who had not watched the series. This influenced his decision to write it as a direct continuation rather than inserting exposition scenes to try to attract new viewers. He felt El Camino could be seen independently from both Breaking Bad and Better Call Saul, similarly to how the two series could be seen independently from one another. However, he also believed the three works existed together in a larger framework, and that viewers needed to watch all of them together to receive the full cumulative experience.

When thinking of which Breaking Bad characters to use for El Camino, Gilligan considered bringing back Skyler White, Walter Jr., Hank and Marie Schrader, and Gus Fring, but could not find a way to incorporate them into Jesse's story. Saul Goodman was also considered, but Gilligan refrained as he was unaware of the potential plans Peter Gould and the Better Call Saul writers might have for the character in that series. An early concept included bringing back Uncle Jack as a ghost that goaded Jesse throughout his journey, but Gilligan discarded this idea as too dreary, believing Jesse had already suffered enough. Of the characters he ended up using, Gilligan felt most excited to bring back the sociopathic Todd Alquist, maintaining that he was fascinated with the character and wished he could have been further explored on the series. Jesse Plemons, who portrayed Todd, expressed surprise at his deceased character's sizable role upon first reading the script. He described his portion of the film as Todd having his best day free from his elders' supervision, and likened his scenes with Jesse to a dark buddy comedy.

With Todd and the rest of the neo-Nazi gang canonically dead at the end of "Felina", Gilligan felt the film needed a new villain to introduce conflict for Jesse in the new storyline. For this reason, Gilligan created the character Neil Kandy, the welder whom Gilligan labeled "Nazi-adjacent" due to his prior business dealings with the gang. He also described Neil as being more sociopathic than Todd, saying it would take someone of Neil's caliber to create the dog run that physically tethered Jesse without asking too many questions or even caring about Jesse's condition. Gilligan worried about introducing a new character not seen in Breaking Bad, but called it "Drama 101" to include Neil as he gave Jesse a villain he could prevail against and provided the film with more visceral flair.

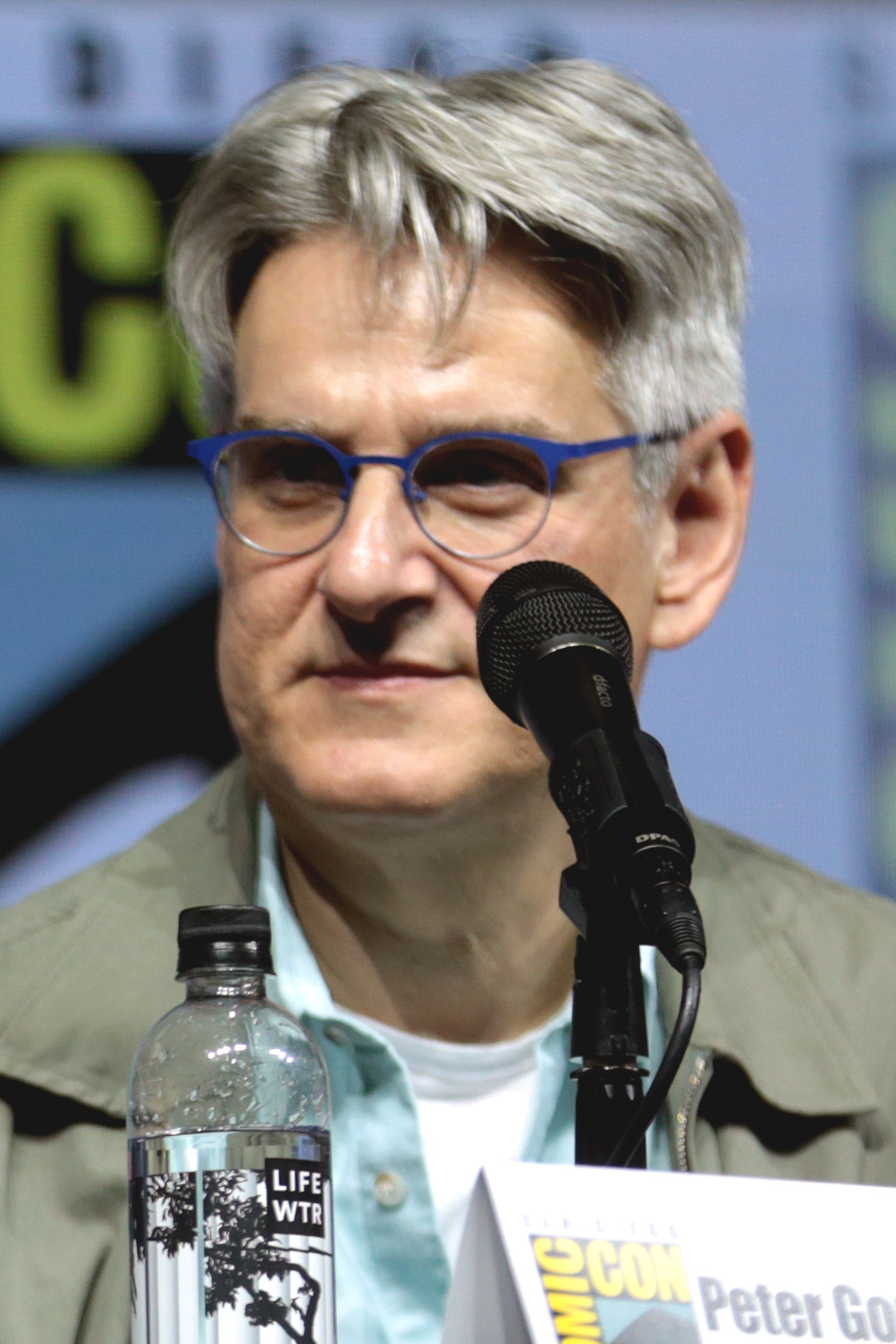
Peter Gould and the Better Call Saul writing staff consulted Gilligan as he developed the screenplay.

Gilligan consulted the Better Call Saul writers' room throughout El Camino's writing process to not only ensure the two projects' continuity did not interfere with one another, but to also take in suggestions to improve his screenplay. Upon completion of his first draft, Gilligan immediately sought the advice of Gould, who developed Better Call Saul with Gilligan and became its sole showrunner after Gilligan reduced his own role in the series. The decision to bring Jane Margolis into the story resulted from this consultation, as the initial script did not include her. After Gould read the first draft, he advised that Jane could appear in the ending, where it would mean the most to the audience. Gilligan thought about the suggestion for a couple of weeks and eventually agreed. He incorporated the idea into his script, and Jane ultimately delivered the final lines of El Camino. Krysten Ritter, who reprised the role in the film, called the ending with her character "so beautiful" as it "sent Jesse off into the sunset with Jane riding shotgun ... He was going to be okay, and she was there with him".

One of the biggest elements removed in later drafts was the very first thing Gilligan wrote for the script: the contents of Jesse's letter to Brock. Gilligan planned on having it read in voice-over while Jesse drove through Alaska in the final scene; Paul described it as "the most honest, beautiful, caring letter imaginable – really, just pouring his heart out and saying he's sorry". While the Better Call Saul staff praised the letter's content, Gould and several others felt it would be better left to the audience's imagination to determine what Jesse wrote. Gilligan subsequently decided not to use the letter to conclude Jesse's story, and the voice-over was never recorded. Paul agreed with Gilligan's decision but expressed disappointment that it did not appear in the final cut. He retained possession of the letter after filming finished and shared his hope that its contents would eventually be revealed to the public.

Gilligan wrote the scene of Walter and Jesse sitting in the diner in a light-hearted tone, with the intention of providing one last chance to see the two characters together as a final treat for the fans. Producer Melissa Bernstein suggested adding a bit more poignancy to the scene to let it further resonate with the audience. Gilligan left most of the scene from the original script intact, but he and Bernstein came up with the line, "You're really lucky, you know that? That you didn't have to wait your whole life to do something special", tying the scene to El Camino's theme of Jesse finally taking control of his life.

=== Filming ===
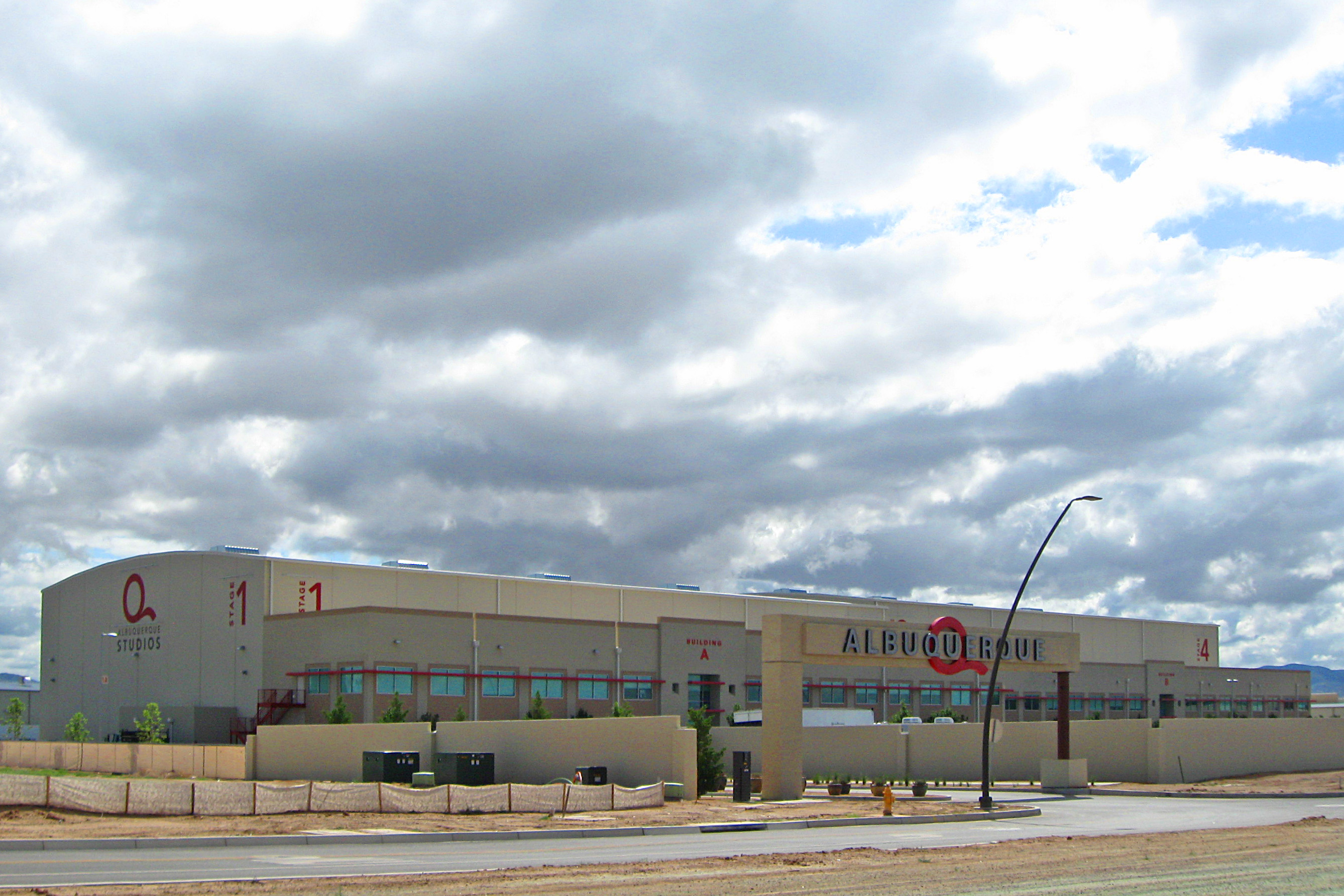
Filming for El Camino primarily took place at Albuquerque Studios, where both Breaking Bad and Better Call Saul were also shot.

Principal photography for El Camino began in Albuquerque, New Mexico in November 2018 and ended February 2019, with the overall shoot lasting 50 days. Filming mainly occurred at Albuquerque Studios, where both Breaking Bad and Better Call Saul were shot, along with other locations throughout the city. Wireless microphones were planted throughout the sets and on the actors to record natural ambient noise and dialogue while shooting, as Gilligan preferred using organic sounds rather than applying ADR during post-production.

The film had a more relaxed shooting pace than Breaking Bad, with only one and a half to three pages of script filmed per day rather than six to eight. This lower-pressure schedule gave the actors more opportunities to improvise on set, while providing the crew members time to film a wider variety of shots and further camera coverage. Gilligan felt the slower pace allowed him to reflect and feel a greater sense of finality for his creation whilst filming.

The first footage filmed for El Camino was the shot where Jesse collapses into bed after showing up at Badger and Skinny Pete's house. Despite not portraying their characters since the show's ending several years prior, cast members felt at ease reprising their former roles. Paul filmed his scenes without any rehearsals, as he felt he could easily access Jesse's emotions the same way he could on the series. He likened his reprisal as Jesse to zipping on an old friend. El Camino also used many of the crew members who held their roles since the pilot of Breaking Bad, as several carried over to Better Call Saul when the show concluded. Paul compared his first day of shooting with Gilligan, Matt Jones, Charles Baker, and the show's former crew members to a family reunion.

Production nearly decided to forgo filming the shot of Jesse picking up a beetle outside Neil Kandy's office, (Note: A callback to a similar scene in "Peekaboo".) citing scheduling constraints. However, Paul remained adamant about capturing the moment, citing it as a key insight into Jesse's frame of mind. The crew relented and filmed the scene in one take.

=== Cinematography ===
El Camino used a 2.39:1 widescreen aspect ratio on the Arri Alexa 65 camera to capture the work in a cinematic manner. Gilligan and cinematographer Marshall Adams specifically chose the Alexa 65 for its quality in low-light filming, which the film heavily featured. Using this camera also meant El Camino would be shot digitally, as opposed to Breaking Bad which shot on 35mm film stock. Production designer Judy Rhee noted that Gilligan took advantage of his lens and wider aspect ratio to create a more visually luxurious experience than the series, letting the wide vista shots help meet El Camino's plot beats rather than employing more economic options commonly used for television. Adams agreed with this opinion, citing as an example the vast and empty space of the Painted Desert underscoring Jesse's lonely and hopeless state in Todd's captivity.

Gilligan wanted El Camino's cinematography to maintain the naturalistic look used on Breaking Bad and Better Call Saul while also expanding it. Adams specified this as the "realistic, practical-driven looks for night exteriors and low-light interiors that embraced all the colors and looks of Albuquerque" that he used on Better Call Saul. By combining the Alexa 65 with Arri Prime DNA lenses, Adams could capture low-light efficiently, control depth of field, and also maintain color contrast and balance. Adams graded El Camino's color palette with DaVinci Resolve; he did not let Breaking Bad dictate which colors he used and opted to make a palette specific to the film. To help receive dailies, production used FotoKem, who did the same work on both Breaking Bad and Better Call Saul. The crew delivered footage with requested color changes to on-site FotoKem members, who then applied the changes to get the dailies out fairly quickly for Adams' review.

Adams saw El Camino as a way to pay homage to original Breaking Bad cinematographer Michael Slovis. Though Adams took over as director of photography during the third season of Better Call Saul, he previously filmed pick-ups with Slovis during the end of Breaking Bad's fourth season and served as cinematographer during that show's fifth-season premiere. For El Camino, Adams took great lengths to match Slovis' lensing from the series while modifying it for the film's digital format and larger aspect ratio. He specified the opening of Jesse driving out of the compound as one scene he updated using this approach, likening it to a direct cut from Jesse's last appearance in Breaking Bad's finale. Adams applied the same principle for other scenes which used locations from the series, such as the compound and the vacuum store.

To distinguish the flashback scenes from the ones set in the present, Gilligan decided against using different color saturation. Instead he chose to have flashbacks filmed in a handheld look while having the present-day scenes more anchored and locked down. The fact that much of Breaking Bad used handheld filming inspired this decision. As the Alexa 65 camera was too large to carry while filming, Gilligan achieved the wiggling effect by placing the camera on top of a truck airbag, which could be inflated and deflated easily between two plastic plates.

=== Set design ===
Notable new sets built in the studio included Todd's apartment and the welding shop where Jesse's final confrontation with Neil Kandy and Casey took place. For the first, Rhee, who worked as the production designer on Better Call Saul's fourth season, arranged the apartment set to reflect the duality of Todd's character. The initial living room seemed sunny, meticulous, and clean, reflective of Todd's exterior "Boy Scout" personality, decorated with a childlike Easter egg palette to give a sense of his arrested development. However, the set's palette became darker going further into his bedroom, indicative of Todd's sociopathic tendencies. Plemons likened the apartment set to looking inside Todd's brain, describing absolute chaos beneath the apparent order on the surface. Rhee also designed the dimensions of the apartment set to fit El Camino's aspect ratio when shooting overhead. This arrangement allowed Gilligan to create the shot of Jesse searching for Todd's money in several different rooms simultaneously. For the welding shop set, Rhee wanted to maintain accuracy about how a welding business looked and match its exterior location, but also designed the set for the scene's stunt choreography and necessary camera blocking. Rhee incorporated the glass office in the back of the set to include breakage during the climax and enhance the scene's action beats.

Several Breaking Bad locations were reused for El Camino, such as the Pinkman residence, the strip mall that contained Saul Goodman's office, and Ed Galbraith's vacuum repair shop. The original vacuum store had sold and become a furniture store since the series ended, so production had to recreate the set from scratch and use a special buyer to locate identical props from flea markets and salvage areas. Having a restored set for the vacuum repair store provided an added convenience for the fifth-season premiere of Better Call Saul, which aired several months later. Initially, the episode included Ed Galbraith simply as a voice-over, as the budget could not cover the cost of flying actor Robert Forster to Albuquerque and rebuilding the vacuum shop set. However, Bernstein recognized that both Forster and the rebuilt set would be available as part of El Camino, and arranged for Gilligan to shoot the Better Call Saul scene with Forster in person during the film's production, months before filming began for any other episodes.

One major Breaking Bad location that had to be rebuilt primarily on stage was the compound that held Jesse prisoner, as many of the original structures had been torn down. The new set recreated the interior of Jesse's cage for the initial scenes of Jesse in captivity and seeing Todd through the steel grate. Filming for the subsequent exterior sequence of Todd letting Jesse out of his confinement happened on location; production found an existing Quonset hut in downtown Albuquerque and built a slightly smaller scale cage next to it in order to match the original site from the series. The rebuilt set for the compound laboratory reused a majority of the original props, notably the cooking vessel Walter White touched shortly before he died in Breaking Bad's final scene. Despite resulting in a continuity error, Gilligan said he did not have the heart to clean Walt's bloody handprint from the prop and instead left it as an Easter egg for fans.

=== Exterior locations ===
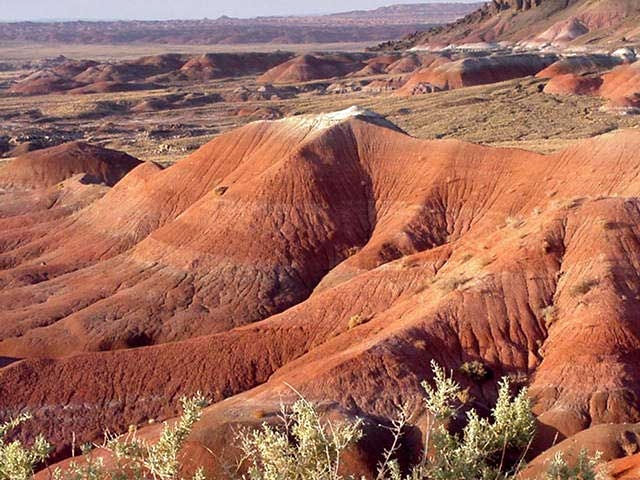
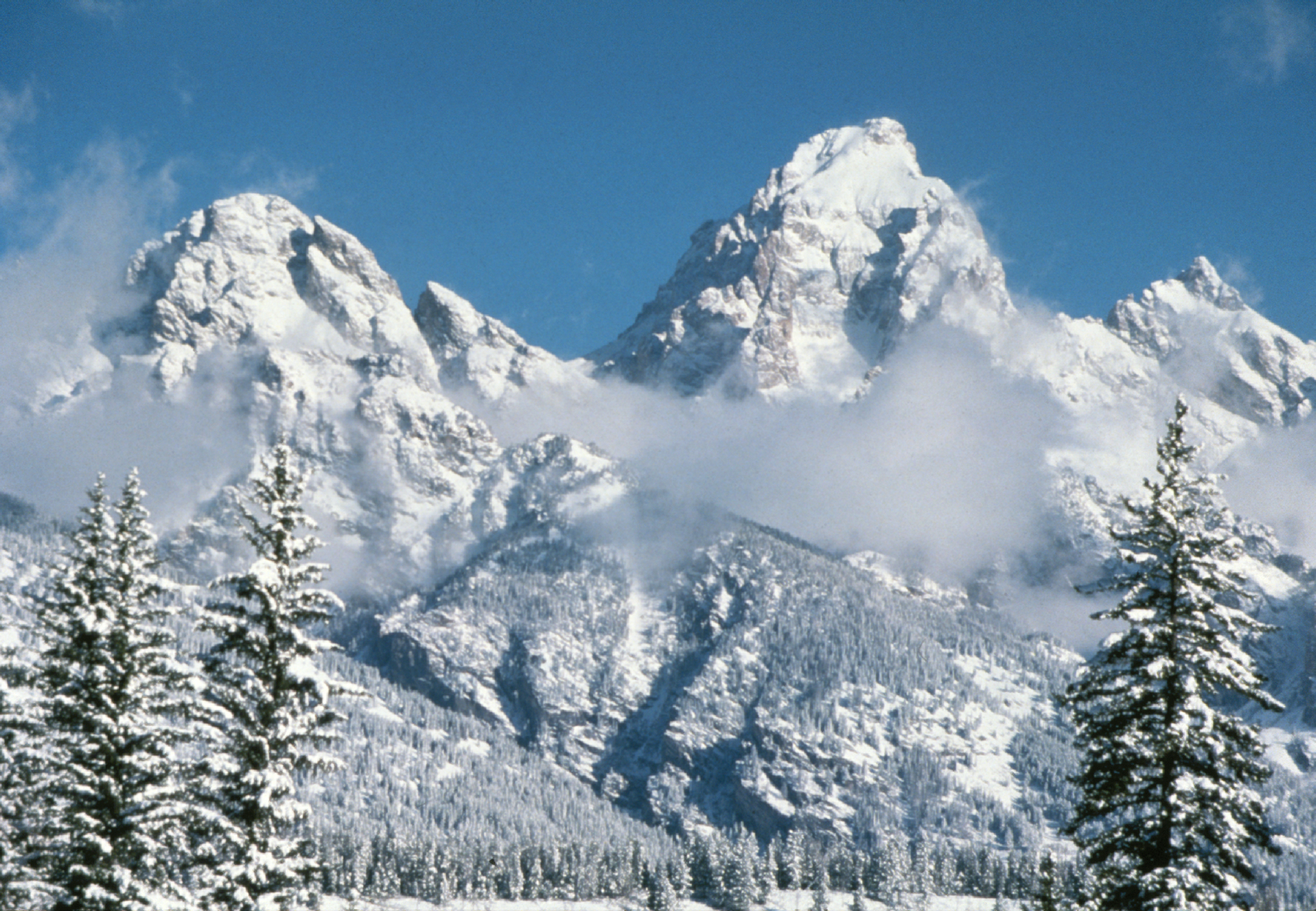
In addition to Albuquerque, filming locations included the Painted Desert in Arizona (left) and around the Grand Tetons in Wyoming (right).

The enhanced budget and filming schedule gave Gilligan a chance to capture scenes outside New Mexico, something he had wanted but could not do during Breaking Bad. One such location included the Painted Desert in Arizona, where filming occurred for the scene of Jesse and Todd burying Todd's housekeeper. Gilligan had the idea of shooting in the region after multiple helicopter trips between California and Albuquerque, noting the landscape's natural beauty. Gilligan received special permission from the Navajo Nation for backroad travel in the Painted Desert for filming. Paul and Plemons reached the Painted Desert set by a helicopter flown by Gilligan himself, who was a licensed pilot. The scene where Todd sings "Sharing the Night Together" in his El Camino was also shot in the area; Gilligan noted that Plemons improvised the gesture Todd gives to the truck driver. Gilligan later referred to his time filming in the Painted Desert as the single best day of directing in his career.

Another sequence filmed outside Albuquerque was the concluding scene of Jesse driving towards his new life in Haines, Alaska. Gilligan wanted to use the Haines Highway to shoot on location, as he had looked up Alaska's major highways online and found it to be the prettiest. However, production found that option expensive and instead used a similar setting outside Jackson, Wyoming. During the day of filming, the crew took advantage of low cloud cover to hide the Grand Tetons in the background, which allowed them to avoid using digital technology to remove the landmark in post-production. For the preceding scene of Jesse's final conversation with Ed Galbraith in the parking lot outside Haines, filming occurred at the Sandia Crest, a ridgeline at the high point of the Sandia Mountains which overlooks Albuquerque.

=== Secrecy ===
"I've heard so many different things about it, but I am excited about the Breaking Bad movie ... I find it hard to believe you don't know it was shot. They did it. You know what I mean? How is that a secret? But it is. They've done an amazing job of keeping it a secret."

— Bob Odenkirk, star of Breaking Bad spin-off Better Call Saul, speaking on El Camino days before it was officially announced.

El Camino was held in great secrecy from the start of pre-production. Certain cast members were approached for the film without knowing it was for a Breaking Bad continuation, and some kept that fact secret from their families when production began. The producers were very protective of the script during this period; cast and crew members needed to be physically present in front of them in order to read the one copy, which was kept under lock and key. Only near the start of shooting did rumors float that a Breaking Bad film was beginning development, with Paul returning as Jesse. The film was listed under the title Greenbrier at the New Mexico Film Office to further deflect attention during production, with the only description in the logline saying that it "tracks the escape of a kidnapped man and his quest for freedom".

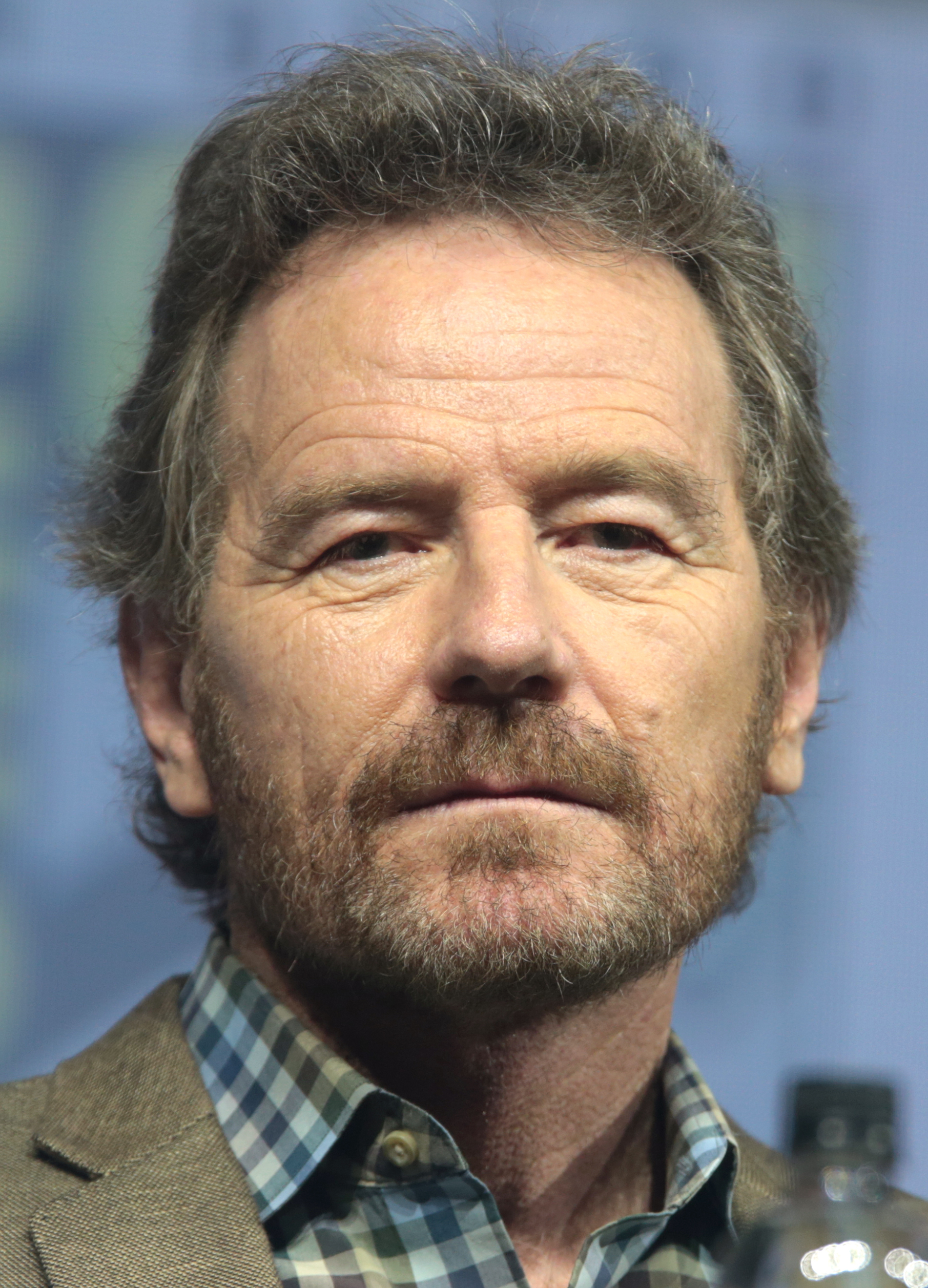
Bryan Cranston's cameo as Walter White was filmed in absolute secrecy during his two-day break from the Broadway play Network.

Bryan Cranston, who starred as Walter White on the series, confirmed the project early on but claimed not to have seen a script, although he showed interest in participating if Gilligan called for it. He ultimately appeared in El Camino, flying to Albuquerque in a private jet to shoot his scenes within the span of 36 hours. At the time he was starring in the Broadway production Network, but used a two-day break in January for filming. As Cranston had grown his hair out since the series ended, the makeup team used a bald cap and fake moustache to achieve the appearance of Walter White, with additional visual effects added during post-production to perfect his look. Filming for the diner scene occurred first, with the set containing only crew members and their families serving as extras in order to keep the shoot confidential. Despite the enclosed filming location, numerous locals spotted the show's iconic RV in the diner's parking lot. To deflect attention, the crew made the excuse that they were shooting a commercial for a Breaking Bad tour. Cranston shot the hallway scene the next day, then immediately returned to the airport, arriving in New York in time to perform that same evening. To prevent paparazzi photos, production heavily disguised Cranston when escorting him between and throughout the set, and told him to avoid seeing Paul in public when filming had concluded for the day.

Similar measures were taken to ensure that news of filming did not reach the locals, with cast and crew under tight restrictions about what they could say about the project. Cast members wore large cloaks to disguise their identities when heading to the set or when shooting outside in public places, and their characters were given code names. When off the set, the cast could not see one another in public, and when recognized they would lie about working on the film. By the time the media began making a connection between Greenbrier and Breaking Bad, filming had mostly been completed. After news broke of a Breaking Bad sequel film, representatives for AMC, Netflix, and Sony Pictures TV all declined to comment regarding the project's existence. A month after this announcement, Paul remained coy about the film's status, claiming in an interview that he had not heard anything regarding a Breaking Bad movie.

Filming for Better Call Saul's fifth season took place shortly after El Camino finished shooting, in order to take advantage of the assembled crew. As such, cast members of Better Call Saul became aware of the film but swore to secrecy on the project. Days before El Camino was officially announced, Bob Odenkirk, who starred as Saul Goodman on Breaking Bad and Better Call Saul, teased that filming had already been completed and said the producers had done "an amazing job of keeping it a secret".

=== Editing ===
The elongated production schedule provided more time for editor Skip Macdonald to work on El Camino's individual scenes and build the film's overall flow. Macdonald, who also served as editor on Breaking Bad and Better Call Saul, described maintaining rhythm and pacing without the use of commercial breaks as one of the biggest differences between his work on the film and the two television series. He also felt that Gilligan's greater leeway during filming resulted in more interesting pieces and design shots during the editing process. Gilligan waited until filming completed before entering the cutting room to give feedback; his initial viewing of Macdonald's rough cut was his first time seeing any production footage edited together.

El Camino's rough cut had an original runtime of three hours, with an estimated 30 percent of footage left out of the finished film. MacDonald mentioned the necessity of excising scenes to sustain audience interest while also preventing the film from exceeding its runtime. One story development removed during post-production involved Jesse getting shot in the side during his final showdown with Neil and Casey. This would have been followed by Ed Galbraith finding a wounded Jesse at the vacuum store the following morning, the latter subsequently opening his car's trunk to reveal the cash he acquired to fulfill his end of the bargain. While Paul asked to keep this sequence in the final cut, Gilligan felt it provided little payoff for the viewers and chose to remove it to let the film reach its conclusion sooner. Other scenes shortened for runtime included Jesse further relaxing in his hotel room before meeting with Walter White and an extended sequence of Jesse and Jane during their road trip. Gilligan confirmed the deleted and extended scenes would be available as bonus features for El Camino's home video release.

== Music ==
=== Score ===
"The Breaking Bad [score] is, at times, very, very spare and I think the El Camino score remains true to that, but there is complexity and a depth to the music that is fuller and greater in order to fill more sonic space in a theater."

— Dave Porter, El Camino composer.

To arrange El Camino's score, production retained the use of composer Dave Porter, who created all of the original music for Breaking Bad and Better Call Saul. Arriving later in the production process, Porter estimated spending six to eight weeks composing the score, much longer than the three to four days per episode for the two series. Given the lengthier production schedule, Gilligan appeared more frequently in the studio to listen to Porter's score and exchange ideas, something he had never done during Breaking Bad. Porter, in turn, felt he had more resources to add nuance to El Camino's music and worked with Gilligan to achieve a cinematic sound which could also establish its own identity.

Porter approached the film sequentially when composing the score, a method he described as unique to his usual process. He arranged the music in the beginning of the film to resemble that of an episode of Breaking Bad before gradually sounding unique to Jesse. Similar to his work on both series, his score used a mix of electronic sounds and live instrumentation. When noting the biggest differences between scoring Breaking Bad and El Camino, Porter mentioned that while the series shifted between multiple interwoven storylines, the film focused on a singular arc – the trials of Jesse, whom he considered the "moral thread" of the series. This more linear storytelling enabled Porter to further explore Jesse's state of mind and experiment with his sound. He described El Camino and its resulting score as more cerebral and psychological, rather than relying on fast-paced adrenaline.

When preparing his score, Porter rewatched the series in order to select musical cues he could revisit for El Camino. Many of the returning characters and locations received updated themes; Porter cited the scenes with Ed Galbraith and the compound as examples. However, to differentiate the flashback scenes from the scenes set in the present, Porter tried to replicate the less cinematic sounds from the original series as closely as possible. He described his main goal in designing the film's sound as wanting to link back to the score used in the series, but in a manner that did not feel jarring or out of place. For this reason, Porter chose not to make any musical references to the original Breaking Bad theme song, which he felt represented Walter White's journey and did not fit in a story primarily about Jesse.

=== Licensed tracks ===
Licensed tracks were used sparingly in El Camino. Two prominent in the final cut included "Sharing the Night Together" by Dr. Hook & the Medicine Show, which Todd sings in the car during his and Jesse's road trip, and "Static on the Radio" by Jim White, which ran over the end credits. White, who first met Gilligan when the two were students at New York University, had previously contributed music to Breaking Bad as well as Home Fries, another film written by Gilligan.

Other licensed tracks include:

- "I'd Really Love to See You Tonight" by England Dan & John Ford Coley
- "Spikey" by Red Snapper
- "Curzon" by Demdike Stare
- "Kountry Gentleman" by Family Force 5
- "Call Me the Breeze" by Lynyrd Skynyrd
- "To Sir with Love" by Lulu
- "A Little Bit of Soap" by The Jarmels
- "If I Didn't Have a Dime" by Ron Moody and the Centaurs

=== Soundtrack ===
Mondo issued an official soundtrack on October 14, 2020, nearly a full year after the film's release. The 26-track double-LP featured Porter's complete score for El Camino, nearly a dozen of the film's licensed songs, and some exclusive bonus tracks. The soundtrack was issued on vinyl with artwork designed by Matt Talbot.

== Marketing ==
Netflix officially announced El Camino: A Breaking Bad Movie on August 24, 2019, unveiling the title, description, poster, logo, teaser trailer, and the October 11, 2019, release date for the film. Days before, Netflix accidentally listed the film on its website, which users quickly noticed before it got pulled. Due to the secrecy of the project, fans and critics alike were taken aback by the sudden announcement and sooner-than-expected release date.

=== Trailers ===
The first teaser released during El Camino's announcement featured a scene where the DEA interrogated Skinny Pete on Jesse Pinkman's whereabouts. Charles Baker reprised the role in the public's first glimpse of the film. Though the scene was not used in the final cut, some critics noted after the film's release of the trailer's significance in El Camino's chronology, speculating that it likely took place shortly after Jesse and Skinny Pete parted ways. Baker later revealed that the original script did not include the teaser trailer's scene.

Netflix released its first trailer on September 10, 2019, which solely consisted of Breaking Bad clips set to a cover of "Enchanted" (Note: The original song by The Platters previously appeared in "Mandala".) by Chloe x Halle. A second teaser, which featured Jesse sitting in the El Camino and listening to news reports of the prior events of the series on the radio, debuted during the 71st Primetime Emmy Awards ceremony on September 22, 2019. A full trailer premiered on September 24, 2019, giving viewers their first full look at clips from El Camino, accompanied by the song "Black Water" by Reuben and the Dark.

Before El Camino's premiere, Netflix released two more promotional videos using new footage from the film or the set: a teaser clip of Old Joe speaking with Jesse on the phone and a two-minute behind-the-scenes featurette. Netflix later released an extended 13-minute behind-the-scenes featurette titled The Road to El Camino on October 29, 2019.

=== The Countdown to El Camino ===
Before the release of El Camino, the Twitter accounts of Breaking Bad and Samsung US shared a countdown. Titled The Countdown to El Camino, the promotion resulted from Samsung's partnership with Netflix. The countdown would also be available as a 62-hour livestream on Samsung televisions prior to the film's release.

The campaign saw the return of Breaking Bad and Better Call Saul character Huell Babineaux, with Lavell Crawford reprising the role. Throughout the countdown, Huell appeared in several short video interludes, sitting impatiently in a safe house, (Note: Where he supposedly resided since "To'hajiilee".), loafing around or watching the news. Upon the countdown's conclusion, a video showed Huell leaving the safe house. The character ultimately did not appear in El Camino, but many remarked that the promotion answered a question long posed by fans about Huell's fate after Breaking Bad ended.

Over 3.5 million viewers watched the livestream before the film's release. Chemistry, the advertising agency behind the promotion, later submitted the campaign for award consideration under the name Waiting with Huell. The campaign earned Bronze Distinction in Television for the 12th Annual Shorty Awards and the Bronze Award for Branded Entertainment & Content for the 2020 Clio Awards.

=== Snow Globe: A Breaking Bad Short ===
In conjunction with the television premiere of El Camino on AMC, the network released a three-minute short film entitled Snow Globe: A Breaking Bad Short on its official YouTube account on February 16, 2020. The short, directed by Eric Schmidt and written by Melissa Ng, stars Jesse Plemons as Todd with Laura Fraser voicing her Breaking Bad role Lydia Rodarte-Quayle. Taking place at some point before the events of the film, the short features Todd assembling a custom snow globe which includes his and Lydia's likenesses and little floating Stevia packets, as he tries to call her to ask her on a date. El Camino featured the same snow globe in the scene when Casey inspects Todd's bedroom.

== Release ==
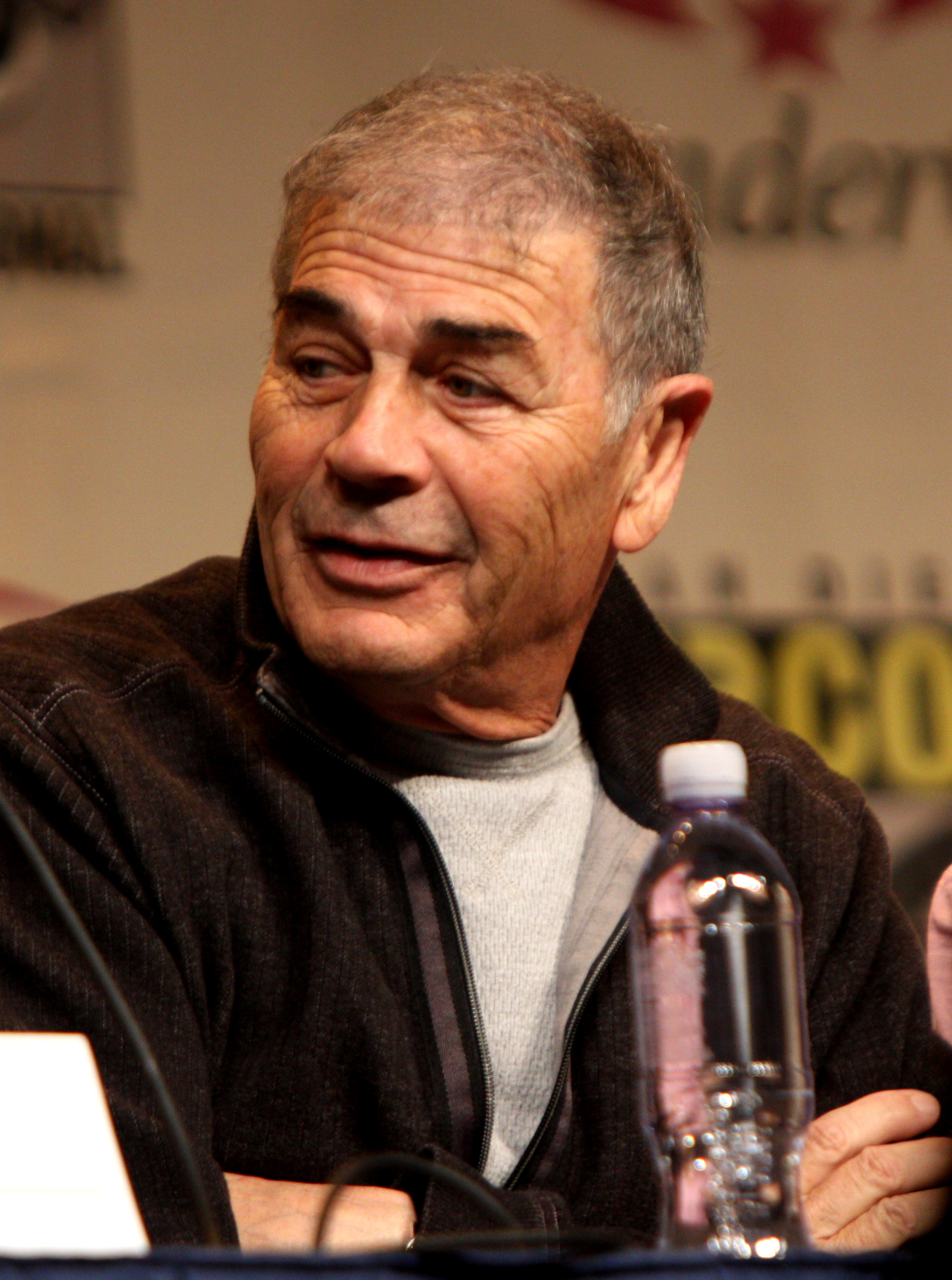
El Camino marked one of Robert Forster's final appearances, as he died on the day of the film's release.

El Camino: A Breaking Bad Movie had its world premiere on October 7, 2019, at the Regency Village Theatre in Los Angeles, with multiple cast members from the film, Breaking Bad, and Better Call Saul in attendance. Netflix digitally released the film on October 11, 2019. El Camino also received a limited theatrical release in the United States from October 11 to 13, 2019. It later premiered on AMC television on February 16, 2020, following a complete marathon of the series on the network.

On the day of El Camino's release, Robert Forster, who played Ed in both the series and film, died of complications from brain cancer at the age of 78. Along with others throughout Hollywood, the cast and crew of Breaking Bad and El Camino paid tribute to him. According to Aaron Paul, Forster watched the film before his passing: "He was so proud of it and of me. He called to tell me that he loved me. I sensed something was wrong, but I got on a plane and, when I landed, he'd died. It was incredibly sad to hear".

=== Audience viewership ===
Nielsen reported that El Camino drew 2.65 million viewers within a day of its release, with an overall 6.54 million total viewers during opening weekend. An additional reported 8.2 million viewers watched a few minutes of El Camino during its first three days of availability. This compared well to Breaking Bad's fifth-season premiere with 5.9 million viewers and finale with 10.3 million when they first aired on AMC. After the first week of its release, Netflix announced that over 25 million households had seen the film.

For El Camino's limited theatrical release, 12 of the 125 theaters that screened the film reported a combined gross of $40,000, an average of $3,333 per venue. TheWrap calculated that if El Camino received a proper wide theatrical release, and that if every reported viewer had purchased a ticket for the average price to see it, then the film would have topped the box office that weekend. Months later, El Camino drew 774,000 viewers for its AMC television premiere.

=== Home media ===
El Camino received its first home video release on October 13, 2020, as a DVD/Blu-ray combo packaged in a limited edition SteelBook from Sony Pictures Home Entertainment. Features exclusive to the Blu-ray consist of a commentary track from Vince Gilligan and Aaron Paul, deleted and extended scenes, a gag reel, and scene studies with Gilligan. Other features on both the Blu-ray and DVD include a commentary track from multiple members of the cast and crew, a behind-the-scenes documentary, promotional teasers and trailers, and visual effects design galleries.

== Reception ==
=== Critical response ===
On the review aggregator website Rotten Tomatoes, El Camino: A Breaking Bad Movie has a score of 92% based on the opinions of 132 critics, with an average rating of 7.3/10. Its critical consensus read, "Entertaining if not essential, El Camino adds a satisfying belated coda to the Breaking Bad story – led by a career-best performance from Aaron Paul". Metacritic, which uses a weighted average, assigned El Camino a score of 72 out of 100 based on 34 critics, indicating "generally favorable" reviews.

Judy Berman of Time lauded Aaron Paul's "mesmerizing" lead performance, citing his ease at "fully re-inhabiting a role he hadn't played for years ... endowing Jesse with the same mix of (waning) goofiness and (escalating) existential terror that propelled him through the finale". Liz Shannon Miller of The Verge elaborated that "[Paul's] work in El Camino is staggering, given the high difficulty factor that comes with having to play so many variations of this character" and followed this by saying, "What makes El Camino so compelling is the way it engages with how he's changed since those early days". In contrast, GQ's David Levesley felt El Camino did not utilize Paul's full potential, saying that "without actors to bounce off, the film often doesn't know what to do with him". Daniel Fienberg of The Hollywood Reporter also highlighted Jesse Plemons' performance, saying, "Plemons never got the respect he deserved ... and this might be a good time to properly relish what an odd and awful guy Todd was".

Fienberg further commended Vince Gilligan's direction, calling Gilligan "a precise and complicated visual stylist ... the conception of Breaking Bad as a modern Western has never been so clearly articulated and executed". He also credited cinematographer Marshall Adams, editor Skip Macdonald, and composer Dave Porter, all of whom worked on Breaking Bad and Better Call Saul, with helping El Camino "return to the original show's grammar". Writing for Entertainment Weekly, critic Darren Franich called Gilligan's style "energetic" and lauded the larger budget being applied "more for high anxiety than flashy pyrotechnics", citing El Camino's cinematography, editing, and montages as examples. Erik Adams of The A.V. Club found El Camino's Western imagery a bit "clumsily deployed" but complimented the scale of the film.

==== As a Breaking Bad continuation ====
From a narrative perspective, Alan Sepinwall of Rolling Stone praised El Camino as a continuation of Breaking Bad, stating that "if the [Breaking Bad] conclusion had a flaw ... it's that Jesse got left behind a bit. By the end of El Camino, that's no longer the case". The Daily Beast's Melissa Leon agreed, saying that "Breaking Bad creator Vince Gilligan's meditative neo-western El Camino attaches a coda to Jesse's story, detailing the emotional (and physical) scars Walt left him to live with". Regarding the film's chronology from the preceding series, Steve Greene of IndieWire commented, "Though the specter of Jesse's former partners haunts El Camino, Gilligan effectively holds the audience's attention to keep them focused on the present". When comparing the film to other franchise continuation projects, Roxanne Sancto of Little White Lies mentioned that "movie spin-offs [have] become a dangerous trend that often ends in disappointment ... the balance needs to be just right and, fortunately, creator Vince Gilligan has nailed it with El Camino".

While Josh Spiegel of /Film found El Camino enjoyable, he saw the film as inessential to the overall arc of the series. He wrote that "if you loved Breaking Bad ... you might have wondered, 'What will happen to Jesse Pinkman next?' It's not even that Vince Gilligan answering that question was a bad idea. It's that a two-hour version of that answer, as beautiful as it looks and as well-acted as it is, was wholly superfluous". Franich similarly compared El Camino to a television reunion special, calling it "a playful project, very fun, not always necessary". Less complimentary was the BBC's Hugh Montgomery, who described it as "a franchise extension as lazy and vacuous as anything dreamt up on the big-screen". However, Alissa Wilkinson of Vox reasoned that the enjoyment of El Camino "comes from seeing your favorite characters again, not finally resolving missing pieces that have tortured your sleep for six years".

Brian Tallerico of RogerEbert.com also noted the necessity of having seen the entirety of Breaking Bad before watching the film, writing, "If you're hazy on what happened in the AMC hit, be warned that El Camino does not hold your hand. It is not designed to exist as a standalone movie as much as something watched after the end of season five". Richard Roeper of Chicago Sun-Times concurred, saying, "You'll be as lost as Badger without Skinny Pete if you tried to watch this sharp and compelling sequel without having seen the series". When discussing which audience would enjoy the film, Vadim Rizov of Sight & Sound remarked, "El Camino will only work for fans who can recall who all these familiar faces are – the nostalgic pull and possibility for reconnection are sometimes recapped in dialogue, most of it avoiding the ludicrously expository, but outsiders will be baffled".

=== Accolades ===
El Camino received several nominations in the streaming or television film categories from major industry award ceremonies where Breaking Bad previously won multiple accolades in the television series categories. Three awards won by the film included Best Movie Made for Television at the Critics' Choice Television Awards, Outstanding Achievement in Sound Editing – Single Presentation at the Golden Reel Awards, and Best Motion Picture Made for Television at the Satellite Awards.

For the 72nd Primetime Creative Arts Emmy Awards, El Camino received four nominations: Outstanding Television Movie, Outstanding Single-Camera Picture Editing and Outstanding Sound Mixing for a Limited Series or Movie, and Outstanding Sound Editing for a Limited Series, Movie, or Special. Critics predicted Outstanding Lead Actor and Outstanding Supporting Actor in a Limited Series or Movie Emmy Award nominations for Paul and Plemons, but neither were amongst the nominees. As Breaking Bad collected a total of sixteen Emmy Awards throughout its run, some critics also felt El Camino could potentially win Outstanding Television Movie based on the series' prior clout with voters. However, Bad Education (2019) went on to claim the award, while Watchmen won in every technical category where El Camino was nominated.

Accolades received by El Camino: A Breaking Bad Movie
Award	Date of ceremony	Category	Nominees	Result	Refs
Cinema Audio Society Awards	January 25, 2020	Outstanding Achievement in Sound Mixing for Television Movie or Limited Series	Phillip W. Palmer, Larry B. Benjamin, Kevin Valentine, Greg Hayes, Chris Navarro, and Stacey Michaels	Nominated	
Critics' Choice Television Awards	January 12, 2020	Best Movie Made for Television	El Camino: A Breaking Bad Movie	Won	
Critics' Choice Television Awards	January 12, 2020	Best Supporting Actor in a Movie/Miniseries	Jesse Plemons	Nominated	
Directors Guild of America Awards	January 25, 2020	Outstanding Directing – Movies for Television and Limited Series	Vince Gilligan (Note: Additional nominees: Robin Le Chanu, Charles Newirth (unit production managers), John Wildermuth (first assistant director), Katy Galow (second assistant director), Nathan E. Davis (second second assistant director), Melissa Bosco-Laude, and Chad Goyette (additional second assistant directors).)	Nominated	
Golden Reel Awards	January 19, 2020	Outstanding Achievement in Sound Editing – Single Presentation	Kurt Nicholas Forshager, Todd Toon, Kathryn Madsen, Jane Boegel, Luke Gibleon, Jason Tregoe Newman, Bryant J. Fuhrmann, Jeff Cranford, Gregg Barbanell, and Alex Ullrich	Won	
Primetime Creative Arts Emmy Awards	September 16, 2020 (Note: The 72nd Primetime Creative Arts Emmy Awards ceremony took place from September 14 to 17, 2020, and on September 19, 2020. The date listed next to each Emmy category denotes when the corresponding award was given.)	Outstanding Single-Camera Picture Editing for a Limited Series or Movie	Skip Macdonald	Nominated	
Primetime Creative Arts Emmy Awards	September 16, 2020	Outstanding Sound Mixing for a Limited Series or Movie	Phillip W. Palmer, Larry B. Benjamin, Kevin Valentine, and Stacey Michaels	Nominated	
Primetime Creative Arts Emmy Awards	September 19, 2020	Outstanding Sound Editing for a Limited Series, Movie, or Special	Kurt Nicholas Forshager, Todd Toon, Kathryn Madsen, Jane Boegel, Luke Gibleon, Jason Tregoe Newman, Bryant J. Fuhrmann, Jeff Cranford, Gregg Barbanell, and Alex Ullrich	Nominated	
Primetime Creative Arts Emmy Awards	September 19, 2020	Outstanding Television Movie	El Camino: A Breaking Bad Movie	Nominated	
Producers Guild of America Awards	January 18, 2020	Outstanding Producer of Streamed or Televised Motion Pictures	Mark Johnson, Melissa Bernstein, Charles Newirth, Vince Gilligan, Aaron Paul, and Diane Mercer	Nominated	
Satellite Awards	December 19, 2019	Best Actor – Miniseries or Television Film	Aaron Paul	Nominated	
Satellite Awards	December 19, 2019	Best Motion Picture Made for Television	El Camino: A Breaking Bad Movie	Won	
Saturn Awards	October 26, 2021	Best Action or Adventure Film	El Camino: A Breaking Bad Movie	Nominated	
Saturn Awards	October 26, 2021	Best Actor in a Film	Aaron Paul	Nominated	
Writers Guild of America Awards	February 1, 2020	Television: Long Form – Adapted	Vince Gilligan	Nominated	

== Future ==
Both Vince Gilligan and Aaron Paul regarded El Camino as the proper conclusion to Jesse Pinkman's story, with neither having immediate plans for a sequel after the film's release. Speculating on Jesse's new life in Haines, Alaska, following the events of El Camino, Gilligan surmised that Jesse "would enjoy the brewery and maybe get a job with the ski manufacturer ... the very nice people of Alaska would welcome him into the community". Paul believed that Jesse is "going to keep his nose clean. He has quite a bit of cash on hand. And he's going to live a very modest lifestyle. He's moving to a very small place in Alaska, so he doesn't need all that much money. He knows how to work with his hands, and so he just needs to refresh those skills and become the artist that he was always meant to be".

However, neither Gilligan nor Paul definitively ruled out the possibility of a sequel film to El Camino. Gilligan wanted to create a new story outside of the Breaking Bad franchise once he helped finish the final season of Better Call Saul, but indicated a slight chance of returning to Jesse's storyline if everyone still held interest. He suggested a possible sequel could take place in Haines. Paul expressed interest in playing Jesse again if Gilligan felt he had more story to tell, but highly doubted such a scenario could occur since the film gave the character a satisfying ending. He also maintained a desire to work with Gilligan again, regardless if the project was related to Breaking Bad or not. Though Paul signaled warmth to the idea of seeing Jesse's adventures in Alaska, he also declined the prospect of a new Breaking Bad season that would focus on him.

Paul eventually reprised Jesse Pinkman again in Better Call Saul's final season for two episodes, with Gilligan directing the second. However, his character's appearances canonically took place before the events of El Camino. After the initial announcement of his guest-starring role, Paul reiterated that any other return as Jesse Pinkman required Gilligan's involvement. Gilligan reaffirmed he had no plans for any new entries in the Breaking Bad franchise shortly before Better Call Saul concluded. Following the series finale, Paul said he felt confident that Better Call Saul marked Jesse's final appearances and called it a farewell to his character.
