= Monocle Radio =

UK-based internet radio station

Coordinates: 51.51977°N 0.15468°W

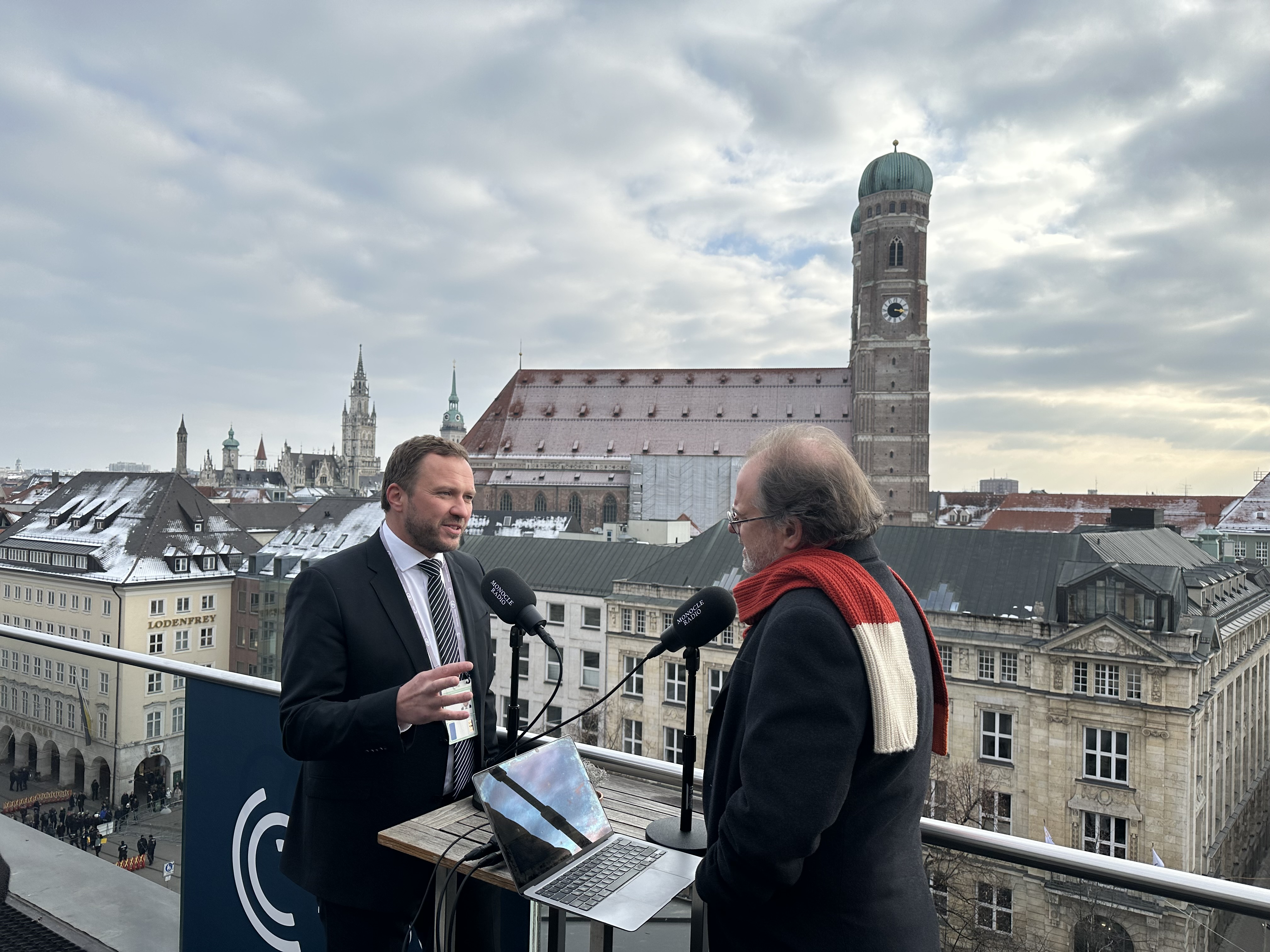
- Monocle Radio interview at the Munich Security Conference on 14 February 2025
- England

History
- First air date: 17 October 2011

Links
- Webcast: Listen Live
- Website: Monocle.com/radio

Monocle Radio (originally launched as Monocle 24) is a mainly speech-based internet radio station, broadcasting from Monocle's headquarters at Midori House in London, England. On weekdays, the station produces three hours of live, current affairs-based programmes. It also broadcasts weekly shows on business; culture; design; food and hospitality; print media and urbanism. Music fills the rest of the schedule, hosted by Monocle staff. Monocle 24 was launched in October 2011 and broadcasts in English, primarily from London, but with an international focus. It is a brand extension of Monocle, a magazine founded in 2007 by Canadian journalist and entrepreneur Tyler Brûlé. Around 80% of listening is via download, 20% via live streaming. In 2016, the station reported a weekly listenership of about 1 million.

== The Monocle Weekly ==
Monocle 24 itself grew out of The Monocle Weekly, a podcast which first appeared on 28 December 2008. Originally hosted by editor Andrew Tuck and culture editor Robert Bound, it covers topics such as politics, business and culture and features interviews with big names across several disciplines, and eventually hit download figures as high as 250,000 per month. The Monocle Weekly is now a one-hour weekend show on the station and is still available as a podcast.

== Station history ==
Monocle 24 launched on 17 October 2011 with four live shows on weekdays: The Globalist, The Briefing, Midori House and The Monocle Daily, as well as several extra shows over the weekend. Surrounding those shows were music hours known as The Continental Shift and The Atlantic Shift, as well as hour-long themed shows Culture with Robert Bound, Section D, The Entrepreneurs, The Urbanist and The Menu. The station was branded by bespoke music idents, including a number featuring the voice of pop star Kylie Minogue and the Quiet Nights Orchestra. The running time of The Briefing, Midori House, Culture, Section D, The Entrepreneurs, The Urbanist and The Menu was cut from 50 to 30 minutes starting on 2 March 2015. At the same time, new programmes, such as The Big Interview (weekly) and Monocle Arts Review (weekdays, 15 minutes long) were added to the schedule. Top-of-the-hour newscasts were also removed from the schedule.

The station is influenced by the BBC World Service. Tyler Brûlé said "From the point of view its ambitions for global reach and coverage of world affairs, Monocle 24 will probably resemble and sound like many commonwealth public service broadcasters, including BBC World Service, as well as shades of Australia's ABC and Canada’s CBC. We are hoping to create a station which follows the tradition of the great Commonwealth broadcasters. It’s no surprise that we have drawn a lot of great people from the BBC World Service."

Changes to the schedule since its launch have included the introduction in August 2012 of The Stack, a 25-minute-long show on magazines and print media hosted by Tyler Brûlé on Saturday mornings. For around the first 18 months of the show's existence, it was 50 minutes long. In January 2014, the running time was cut to 25 minutes. In April 2013, The Globalist was split into The Globalist and The Globalist Asia, with the latter focusing more on listeners in Asia, Australia and New Zealand. The Globalist Asia was last broadcast on 27 December 2013.

Saturday and Sunday feature the Weekend Edition, a mix of news, interviews, music and highlights.

Portions of Monocle 24 programmes were previously broadcast on ABC Radio National in Australia. Other Monocle 24 output is also broadcast by CBC Radio One in Canada as part of CBC Radio Overnight.

Monocle 24 also broadcasts from political, business and cultural events.

The station is live 24 hours a day at monocle.com/radio and also sees 2.5 million downloads per month of its programmes through its website and iTunes.

== Past programmes and content ==
From 17 October 2011 to 2 March 2015, the station broadcast its own newscasts at the top of the hour between 6 am and 11 pm London time. Tomasz Schafernaker provided recorded weather forecasts for the station, but they were quickly dropped. Aperitivo (16 Sept 2013 - 15 November 2013) was a short-lived news-based talk programme, trailed as a "relaxed blend of conversation and analysis." The Globalist, a show on international news and political issues, was originally two hours long. It was later split in two, the second hour becoming The Globalist Asia, but the show was later cancelled. The Review was a weekend show which featured stories about books, movies and theatre.

From launch to 2 March 2015, the station broadcast ABC Radio news bulletins between midnight and 5 am London time.

== Presenters ==
Some of the most frequently heard voices on Monocle Radio are those of magazine staff, such as Tyler Brûlé, Andrew Tuck, Robert Bound, Steve Bloomfield and Sophie Grove. However there are also regular radio staff, such as News Editor Tom Edwards, and producers Markus Hippi and Phil Han, whose voices can be heard across many shows. Freelance staff often appear on the station, such as Georgina Godwin, Nancy Durham, Emma Nelson, Dominic Reynolds, Andrew Mueller, Clemency Burton-Hill, Tadhg Enright, Poppy Trowbridge and Ted Kravitz. Jonathan Wheatley and Gwenan Edwards were among the station's newsreaders.

There are also regular contributions from Monocle staff and guests at the organisation's bureaux in New York, Tokyo, Hong Kong, Zürich and Toronto.
