= CBC Radio Overnight =

Canadian radio programming block

CBC Radio Overnight is a Canadian radio programming block, which airs nightly on CBC Radio One from 1:00 a.m. to 5:30 am (or 6:00 a.m., depending on the station). The program airs only on CBC Radio One's regional outlets; it does not air on the nationwide SiriusXM service.

The program, hosted by Saroja Coelho since late-April 2024, presents a variety of information programs from international broadcasters around the world. At the top of each hour, a regular CBC news update is aired, lasting four and a half minutes. Previous hosts of the program included Cathy Haag, Bernie MacNamee, Pep Philpott, and Jeff Goodes. However, apart from the news updates, the program's content consists primarily of complete programs produced by the CBC or other public broadcasters; the host's main role is to voice prerecorded interstitial announcements of the next program coming to air.

== History ==
The program premiered on May 1, 1995, with its programs sourced from the new World Radio Network. Prior to the program's launch, CBC Radio One signed off during the overnight hours. It had briefly experimented with a 24-hour schedule beginning in January 1991, with overnight programming consisting of repeats of its daytime programming, but this was discontinued by June of that year.

CBC Radio Overnight may, however, be preempted in some markets when the CBC needs to temporarily shut down a local transmitter for maintenance, as overnight transmitter repairs are less disruptive than a daytime shutdown.

== Programming ==
Broadcasters whose programming has aired on Overnight included Radio Netherlands Worldwide, Radio Sweden, Radio Australia, Radio Prague, BBC World Service, Deutsche Welle, Radio Poland, Radio Romania International, and KBS World Radio.

On October 27, 2009, CBC changed the block's schedule, with all programming on weeknights coming from the BBC World Service and Radio Canada International; with the dissolution of Radio Canada International in 2012, The Link was replaced with Public Radio International's The World and a repeat airing of the previous day's edition of CBC Radio's morning show The Current. In 2013, the program added content from Monocle 24. The remainder of the block is filled with programs from Australia's ABC Radio National and the BBC World Service; some programming from RTÉ Radio 1 and Deutsche Welle also airs on weekends.
