= Funeral Sky =

2014 studio album by Reuben and the Dark

Studio album by Reuben and the Dark
- Released: May 2014
- Genre: Indie folk
- Length: 40:12
- Label: Arts & Crafts
- Producer: Christopher Lloyd Hayden, Stephen Kozmeniuk

Reuben and the Dark chronology
Funeral Sky (2014)	Arms of a Dream (2018)

Professional ratings
Review scores
Source	Rating
Allmusic	3/5 stars
Popmatters	6/10 stars
Exclaim!	7/10 stars

Funeral Sky is the debut album of the indie folk band Reuben and the Dark, though the lead vocalist Reuben Bullock had released two solo albums preceding this with members of the same band.

The song Black Water, was later used in the trailer for 2019 film El Camino: A Breaking Bad Movie.

== Production ==
The recording of the album came about because Reuben Bullock, the singer and guitarist of the band, happened to meet Christopher Hayden in Mexico whilst on vacation. This led to some sessions in Mexico followed by more in Canada, before Stephen Kozmeniuk was brought in to record more tracks.

== Critical reception ==
Zachary Houle, writing for Popmatters, gave the album six stars out of ten, and whilst he liked the debut, he had reservations about some of the tracks. "Funeral Sky is a engaging listen, even if it doesn’t fire on all cylinders as one would like. The folksiness of the album is enjoyable, and even when the record stumbles, there’s something of interest to have for the listener." Matt Bobkin, writing in Exclaim!, had similar sentiments to Houle, stating; "The band's identity oscillates between pop craftsmen and languid folkies, with the album at its best when they hit that sweet spot in the middle. Funeral Sky is a decent debut, but the band definitely sounds like they have potential for something greater."

During the 2015 Canadian federal election campaign, it was revealed that Funeral Sky was one of the albums that Justin Trudeau was listening to on the campaign trail.

== Track listing ==
No.	Title	Length
1.	"Bow and Arrow"	3:19
2.	"Devil's Time"	3:40
3.	"Rolling Stone"	4:17
4.	"Shoulderblade"	3:47
5.	"Standing Still"	3:53
6.	"Marionette"	4:45
7.	"A Memory's Lament"	3:32
8.	"The River"	4:04
9.	"Can't See the Light"	3:46
10.	"Funeral Sky"	2:35
11.	"Black Water"	2:35
Total length:		40:12

Expanded deluxe version (2015)
No.	Title	Length
12.	"Winter's Widow"	4:04
13.	"The Rain"	3:30
14.	"Standing Still (alternate version)"	4:52
15.	"Bow and Arrow (alternate version)"	4:00
16.	"Marionette (alternate version)"	3:37
17.	"Red River"	3:53
