= CBC Music Backstage Pass =

Television series

- Presented by: Talia Schlanger (2013–2016); Raina Douris (2016–2017)
- Country of origin: Canada

Production
- Running time: 30 min.
- Production company: CBC Music

Original release
- Network: CBC Television
- Release: 2013 – 2017

CBC Music Backstage Pass is a Canadian music television series, which airs Friday nights and Sunday afternoons on CBC Television. The series, which premiered in 2013, is produced by CBC Music and features live musical performances by musicians, interspersed with short interview segments.

The program was originally hosted by Talia Schlanger. Since her departure from the CBC in 2016 to join WXPN-FM in the United States, the program has been hosted by Raina Douris.
