= Charles Newirth =

American film producer (born 1955)

- Born: August 22, 1955 (age 71); Scarsdale, New York, US
- Education: Ohio State University
- Occupation: Film producer
- Spouse: Susan Newirth
- Children: 2

Charles Newirth (born August 22, 1955) is an American film producer.

Raised in Scarsdale, New York, Newirth received a BA in Photography and Cinema from Ohio State University. He broke into the film industry as a location manager on such films as Flashdance (1983), Pretty in Pink (1986) and Ferris Bueller's Day Off (1986). He later moved up to production manager on Throw Momma from the Train (1987) and RoboCop (1987) before getting his first producing credit as an associate producer on The Package (1989).

Newirth served as a co-producer on Robert Zemeckis' multiple Academy Award-winning blockbuster Forrest Gump (1994). He also co-produced the Barry Levinson films Toys (1992), the multiple Oscar-nominated Bugsy (1991) and as an associate producer on Barry Levinson's Avalon (1990). His other executive producing credits include: Hugo (2011); Zookeeper (2011); Brad Silberling's City of Angels (1998) starring Nicolas Cage and Meg Ryan; Rob Reiner's true-life drama Ghosts of Mississippi (1996) with Alec Baldwin, Whoopi Goldberg and James Woods; The American President (1995), also for director Rob Reiner, starring Michael Douglas and Annette Bening and Jon Turteltaub's Phenomenon (1996) starring John Travolta.

Newirth produced the popular Robin Williams hit Patch Adams (1998), Home Fries (1998) starring Drew Barrymore, and the sleeper hit Galaxy Quest (1999), starring Tim Allen, Sigourney Weaver and Alan Rickman, before joining Revolution Studios in 2000.

Newirth was responsible for overseeing the physical production of all of Revolution Studios' motion pictures. Revolution Studios released 47 films, including America's Sweethearts (2001), Black Hawk Down (2001), XXX (2002), Anger Management (2003), Daddy Day Care (2003), Mona Lisa Smile (2003), Hellboy (2004), 13 Going on 30 (2004) and Rocky Balboa (2006). At Revolution Studios, Newirth served as executive producer on The Water Horse: Legend of the Deep (2007), Across the Universe (2007), Freedomland (2006), Christmas with the Kranks (2004), Peter Pan (2003), Maid in Manhattan (2002), The One (2001) and America's Sweethearts (2001). He continued with Revolution Studios until June 2007, when he returned to working as an independent producer.

Newirth most recently executive produced the blockbuster films Captain America: Brave New World (2025),Shang-Chi and the Legend of the Ten Rings (2021), Ant-Man and the Wasp (2018), Doctor Strange (2016) and Iron Man 3 (2013), for Marvel Studios and Disney.

== Filmography ==
He was a producer in all films unless otherwise noted.

=== Film ===
Year	Film	Credit	Notes
1989	The Package	Associate producer	
1990	Avalon	Associate producer	
1991	Bugsy	Co-producer	
1992	Toys	Co-producer	
1994	Forrest Gump	Co-producer	
1995	The American President	Executive producer	
1996	Phenomenon	Executive producer	
1996	Ghosts of Mississippi	Executive producer	
1998	City of Angels	Executive producer	
1998	Home Fries	Producer	
1998	Patch Adams	Producer	
1999	Galaxy Quest	Producer	
2001	America's Sweethearts	Executive producer	
2001	The One	Producer	
2002	Maid in Manhattan	Executive producer	
2003	Peter Pan	Co-executive producer	
2004	Christmas with the Kranks	Executive producer	
2006	Freedomland	Executive producer	
2007	Perfect Stranger	Executive producer	
2007	Across the Universe	Executive producer	
2007	The Water Horse: Legend of the Deep	Executive producer	
2011	Zookeeper	Executive producer	
2011	Hugo	Executive producer	Uncredited
2013	Iron Man 3	Executive producer	
2016	Doctor Strange	Executive producer	
2018	Ant-Man and the Wasp	Executive producer	
2019	El Camino: A Breaking Bad Movie	Producer	
2021	Shang-Chi and the Legend of the Ten Rings	Executive producer	
2025	Captain America: Brave New World	Executive producer	
2026	Moana	Executive producer	

Production manager

Year	Film	Role	Notes
1982	Parasite	Unit production manager	
1984	Fear City	Unit manager	
1987	RoboCop	Production manager	
1987	Throw Momma from the Train	Production manager	
1988	The Great Outdoors	Production manager	
1989	The Package	Production manager	
1990	Avalon	Unit production manager	
1991	Bugsy	Production manager	
1992	Toys	Unit production manager	
1994	Forrest Gump	Unit production manager	
1995	The American President	Unit production manager	
1996	Phenomenon	Unit production manager	
1996	Ghosts of Mississippi	Unit production manager	
1999	Galaxy Quest	Unit production manager	
2001	Black Hawk Down	Executive in charge of production	
2002	Punch-Drunk Love	Executive in charge of production	
2002	XXX	Executive in charge of production	
2003	Anger Management	Executive in charge of production	
2003	Daddy Day Care	Executive in charge of production	
2003	The Missing	Executive in charge of production	
2003	Mona Lisa Smile	Executive in charge of production	
2004	Hellboy	Executive in charge of production	
2004	13 Going on 30	Executive in charge of production	
2005	Are We There Yet?	Executive in charge of production	
2005	Rent	Executive in charge of production	
2006	Click	Executive in charge of production	Uncredited
2006	Rocky Balboa	Executive in charge of production	
2011	Hugo	Unit production manager	
2016	Doctor Strange	Unit production manager	
2018	Ant-Man and the Wasp	Unit production manager	
2019	El Camino: A Breaking Bad Movie	Unit production manager	

Location management

Year	Film	Role	Notes
1982	The Seduction	Location manager	
1982	Cat People	Location manager	Uncredited
1983	Flashdance	Location manager	Uncredited
1984	Thief of Hearts	Location manager	
1985	Perfect	Location manager	
1985	My Man Adam	Location manager	
1986	Pretty in Pink	Location manager	
1986	Ferris Bueller's Day Off	Location manager	
1987	Blind Date	Location manager	

Miscellaneous crew

Year	Film	Role
1980	Can't Stop the Music	Production assistant
1982	Cat People	Production assistant

Second unit director or assistant director

Year	Film	Role
2006	Freedomland	Second unit director

Thanks

Year	Film	Role
1991	Kafka	Special thanks
2002	Punch-Drunk Love	Special thanks

=== Television ===
Thanks

Year	Title	Role	Notes
2021	The Movies That Made Us	Special thanks	Documentary
