= Bob Mackowycz =

Canadian musician and broadcaster (1969–2024)

Bob Mackowycz, Jr. (1969) is a Canadian musician, writer and broadcaster.

The son of writer and radio program director Bob Mackowycz, Sr., he first became prominent as a rock musician with the band Glueleg. He later moved into radio and television production, producing TSN's Off the Record and CBC Television's The Hour. As a broadcaster, he hosted talk programming on Toronto's CFRB, as well as being Tom Allen's regular substitute host on CBC Radio 2's Radio 2 Morning, before being named the latter program's new permanent host in November 2009. Mackowycz also served as a regular contributor to Radio 2's The Strombo Show.

He earned a 2008 National Screen Institute Drama Prize for the script to the film short The Way It Used to Be. He graduated from the Canadian Film Centre's Prime Time Television program.

On July 18, 2011, Mackowycz announced that he would be leaving the CBC following the July 25 edition of Radio 2 Morning and was succeeded as host of Radio 2 Morning by Tom Power.

Mackowycz later joined Toronto sports radio station CHUM (TSN Radio 1050), as a co-host of drive-home show, Cybulski and Company. On February 18, 2013, after Cybulski left TSN, Mackowycz was moved to the 9 AM to 12 PM timeslot as a co-host for Macko & Cauz alongside Matthew Cauz.
