= The One (2001 film) =

American science fiction action film

- Theatrical release poster
- Directed by: James Wong
- Written by: Glen Morgan; James Wong
- Produced by: Steve Chasman; Glen Morgan; Charles Newirth; James Wong
- Starring: Jet Li; Delroy Lindo; Carla Gugino; Jason Statham
- Cinematography: Robert McLachlan
- Edited by: James Coblentz
- Music by: Trevor Rabin
- Production companies: Columbia Pictures; Revolution Studios; Hard Eight Pictures
- Distributed by: Sony Pictures Releasing
- Release date: November 2, 2001 (United States)
- Running time: 87 minutes
- Country: United States
- Language: English
- Budget: $49 million
- Box office: $79.6 million

The One is a 2001 American science fiction action film directed by James Wong, and written by Wong and Glen Morgan. It stars Jet Li, Delroy Lindo, Carla Gugino, and Jason Statham, with action choreography by Corey Yuen. The film, which deals with the concept of the multiverse and interdimensional travel, follows Gabriel Yulaw (Li), a rogue agent who travels to parallel realities in order to kill other versions of himself to become a mythical super-being known as "The One". Li plays a dual role as Yulaw and Gabe Law, an LASD deputy sheriff who teams up with a multiverse agent to prevent Yulaw from becoming the One.

Produced by Revolution Studios, The One was released in the United States by Columbia Pictures on November 2, 2001. The film grossed $79.6 million worldwide. While it initially received poor reviews from mainstream critics, some modern commentators classify the film as a cult classic within Li's Hollywood filmography due to its martial arts action scenes.

== Plot ==
Gabriel Yulaw, once an agent of the MultiVerse Authority (MVA) which polices interdimensional travel, seeks to hunt down 124 variants of himself across parallel universes. By killing his other selves and absorbing their life energies, Yulaw believes that he will become a super-powered, godlike being called "The One".

After killing Lawless, a convict and the 123rd variant in the Anubis Universe, Yulaw is captured by MVA agents Roedecker and Funsch and taken back to the MVA headquarters in the Alpha Universe. He is sentenced to life in the Hades Universe's Stygian penal colony, but Yulaw manages to escape with the help of an accomplice and teleports to the Charis Universe.

The last known variant, Gabe Law, is a deputy sheriff working of the Los Angeles County Sheriff's Department within the Charis Universe. For two years, Gabe has been experiencing increases in strength, speed, and mental ability, but neither he nor his wife T.K. can understand why. While transporting a prisoner, Gabe "feels" Yulaw's presence in time to avoid being shot. Gabe sustains an injury after falling from a wall which Yulaw scales with ease. Roedecker and Funsch arrive in time to stop Yulaw from finishing him off.

Although unfamiliar with interdimensional travel, Gabe realizes that Yulaw is identical to him in every way. Roedecker and Funsch track Yulaw to the hospital where Gabe is being examined. Yulaw deters them from shooting him because if he is killed, Gabe would then be left as the One. Dressed alike and identical to each other, Gabe and Yulaw's battle confuses the other police officers. Both Gabe and Yulaw manage to escape the hospital.

The MVA agents deviate from their orders and split up. Roedecker pursues and fights Yulaw but is killed when the latter breaks his neck, disabling a bomb Roedecker intended to use to finish both of them off. Funsch catches up with Gabe and explains to him that there are multiple universes with wormholes briefly connecting them at uncontrollable times. Meanwhile, Yulaw sneaks into Gabe's residence where T.K., believing him to be Gabe, agrees to hide him from the police. She realizes that Yulaw is deceiving her but not in time to avoid being captured. Gabe arrives, only to watch helplessly as Yulaw kills T.K. Funsch finds a guilt-ridden Gabe and both team up to find Yulaw at the next wormhole.

Gabe and Funsch arrive at an industrial plant, where they encounter and fight Yulaw. Funsch is easily defeated but Gabe and Yulaw are more evenly matched. Gabe manages to gain the upper hand but only seconds before the wormhole arrives. All three of them are sucked into it and collapse on the floor of the MVA headquarters. Yulaw is transported immediately to the Hades Universe after a failed attempt to switch places with Gabe. The MVA then prepares to send Gabe back to his own universe, where he will take the fall for Yulaw's crimes. Recalling an earlier conversation with Gabe, Funsch compassionately sends him to a different universe in which Gabe can have a normal life again from when he first met T.K.

Now imprisoned in the Hades Universe, Yulaw declares that he will still become the One and then proceeds to battle several of the penal colony's inmates on top of a ziggurat.

== Cast ==
- Jet Li in nine roles as:
  - Gabe Law, an L.A.S.D. Deputy Sheriff and martial artist from the Charis Universe.
  - Gabriel Yulaw, a former Multiverse Authority (M.V.A.) agent from the Alpha Universe.
  - Yu Fook Law, a rastafari variant from the Monoceros Universe and one of Yulaw's victims.
  - Swen Law, a surfer the Tucana Universe and one of Yulaw's victims.
  - Ni Dilaw, a variant from the Canopus Universe and one of Yulaw's victims.
  - Kia Jilaw, a variant from the Serpens Universe and one of Yulaw's victims.
  - Seth Law, a long-haired variant from the Procyon Universe and one of Yulaw's victims.
  - Frun Law, a variant from the Shaula Universe and one of Yulaw's victims.
  - Lawless, a notorious and violent criminal from the Anubis Universe and one of Yulaw's victims.
- Jason Statham as Evan Funsch, an M.V.A. agent from Alpha Universe and Roedecker's current partner.
- Delroy Lindo as:
  - Harry Roedecker, an M.V.A. agent from the Alpha Universe who is Yulaw's archenemy and former partner.
  - Arri, a gas station attendant from Charis Universe.
- Carla Gugino as:
  - T.K. Law, a vet and Gabe Law's wife in the Charis Universe.
  - Massie Walsh, a criminal and Yulaw's girlfriend and lover in the Alpha Universe.
  - Carla, a vet from an unknown universe.
- James Morrison as:
  - Bobby Aldrich, Gabe Law's fellow L.A.S.D. officer in the Charis Universe.
  - Anubis Universe Inmate #1, an unnamed inmate and Lawless' enemy in the Anubis Universe.
- Dylan Bruno as Yates, Gabe Law's fellow L.A.S.D. officer from the Anubis Universe and Charis Universe.
- Richard Steinmetz as D'Antoni, Gabe Law's fellow officer in the L.A.S.D. from the Anubis Universe and Charis Universe.
- Archie Kao as Woo, Gabe Law's fellow officer in the L.A.S.D. from the Anubis Universe and Charis Universe.
- Dean Norris as L.A.S.D. Sgt. Siegel from the Anubis Universe and Charis Universe.
- Steve Rankin as M.V.A. Supervisor
- Tucker Smallwood as a Prison Warden of M.V.A.
- Harriet Sansom Harris as Nurse Besson
- Mark Borchardt as Cesar
- Doug Savant as L.A.P.D. officer (uncredited)

== Production ==
Originally the film was to have starred Dwayne "The Rock" Johnson, before Li assumed the lead role.

The hospital scenes were filmed at the North Hollywood Medical Center.

The documentary Jet Li Is 'The One' in the special features section on the DVD explains that both Gabriel Yulaw and "Gabe" Law use martial arts that represent their personalities. Yulaw uses Xingyiquan (The Shape-Will Fist), characterized by aggressive linear movements, while Gabe uses Baguazhang (The Eight Trigram Palms), which uses subtle, circular movements. These martial arts are confirmed by their own personalities as Yulaw is very direct, not caring whom he hurts, while Gabe believes life goes in a circle, perfectly balanced.

== Soundtrack ==
The score was composed by Trevor Rabin, conducted by Gordon Goodwin and performed by the Hollywood Studio Symphony and was released on December 11, 2001, but no soundtrack album was released.

== Reception ==
=== Box office ===
The One grossed $43.9 million in the United States and Canada and $28.7 million internationally, grossing $72.7 million worldwide. The film was released in the United Kingdom on April 12, 2004, and grossed $1.3 million, boosting the film's worldwide cume to $74 million. As of April 2023, the film has grossed $35.7 million internationally and its worldwide gross has boosted to $79.6 million.

=== Critical response ===
The film received largely negative reviews. Based on 89 reviews collected by Rotten Tomatoes, 14% of critics have given the film a positive review, with an average rating of 3.9/10. The site's critics consensus reads, "The One plays more like a video game than a movie and borrows freely from other, better sci-fi actioners, burying Jet Li's spectacular talents under heaps of editing and special effects." On Metacritic, the film has a weighted average score of 25 out of 100 based on reviews from 21 critics, indicating "generally unfavorable reviews". Audiences surveyed by CinemaScore gave the film a grade "B" on scale of A to F.

Roger Ebert gave the film 1.5 out of 4 stars, calling it "brainless high-tech action without interesting dialogue, characters, motivation or texture." Robert Koehler of Variety wrote: "The combo of cheesy effects and martial arts choreographer Cory Yuen's unimaginative staging results in something that's martial artless."

Loren King of the Chicago Tribune gave a favorable review, writing that the movie delivered "the high-octane sequences starring martial-arts expert Jet Li with precision and well-crafted pace." King gave a score of 3 out of 4. Sean Axmaker of the Seattle Post-Intelligencer also gave a favourable review noting that James Wong "manage[d] to create a fun, inventive, mischievously tongue-in-cheek showcase" giving a B− score.

== Home media ==
The One was released on home video on August 19, 2002. The DVD contained audio commentary, interviews with James Wong, Jet Li and others. Almar Haflidason of the BBC reviewed the DVD release giving a score of 4 out of 5. A Blu-ray version was released in the UK by 88 Films in November 2022 with additional special features.
