= Arms of a Dream =

2018 studio album by Reuben and the Dark

Studio album by Reuben and the Dark
- Released: 2018
- Genre: Folk rock, Indie rock
- Label: Arts & Crafts
- Producer: Stephen Kozmeniuk, Adrianne Gonzalez, Graham Lessard

Reuben and the Dark chronology
Funeral Sky (2014)	Arms of a Dream (2018)	un love (2019)

Professional ratings
Review scores
Source	Rating
Allmusic	3.5/5 stars
The Spill Magazine	4/5 stars
Exclaim!	8/10 stars

Arms of a Dream is the second album by Canadian indie folk band, Reuben and the Dark. Four years separate this album and its predecessor (Funeral Sky), which Reuben Bullock, the band's singer and guitarist, attributed to over-complicating the recording process.

The album title is borrowed from a poem that singer/guitarist Reuben Bullock had written previous to the recording of the album.

== Production ==
Arms of a Dream is Reuben and The Dark's second full band album, but the fourth they recorded as an ensemble. Reuben Bullock admitted to having problems assembling songs for the album in a typical Sophomore slump. Between 50 and 60 songs were tried and rehearsed, but in the end only 11 tracks made it onto the album. The album was recorded over four years, with Reuben Bullock stating that the album was connected by themes of "sleep and waking states. Love. Loss. Lessons and premonitions."

== Critical reception ==
Ghettoblaster magazine said that "Arms of a Dream finds Reuben and the Dark working outside its comfort zone, both musically and lyrically. The result is Bullock’s most vivid and transformative music to date: an intimate exploration of the inversion of imagination and reality in dreams." The Calgary Herald said that "It’s not hard to envision the songs on Arms of a Dream filling a stadium."

== Track listing ==
No.	Title	Length
1.	"Wildlife"	4:16
2.	"All or Nothing"	3:14
3.	"Hurricane"	3:43
4.	"Dreaming"	3:13
5.	"Heart in Two"	3:39
6.	"Arms of a Dream"	4:50
7.	"Hallelujah"	3:04
8.	"Castaway"	3:50
9.	"Woke Up a Rebel"	3:28
10.	"Stay Wild"	5:22
11.	"Realize"	5:32
Total length:		43:17

Expanded deluxe version (2019)
No.	Title	Length
12.	"Hold Me Like a Fire"	3:12
13.	"Hallelujah (alternate version)"	3:36
14.	"Bobcaygeon"	4:17
15.	"You and I"	4:57
