= Just Asking =

Canadian radio program

Just Asking is a Canadian radio program, which premiered in 2024 on CBC Radio One. Hosted by Saroja Coelho, the program is a live phone-in show on which callers can ask questions of guest experts on lifestyle topics such as health, personal finance, career planning and technology.

First introduced as a one-hour show on Saturday afternoons, it was expanded in the fall to two hours, aligning it with the Sunday afternoon Cross-Country Checkup on news and political topics. The program replaced Cross-Country Checkup's similar "Ask Me Anything" feature.

Concurrently with the show's launch, Coelho, who was the weekday host of Mornings on the sister network CBC Music, dropped Mondays from her schedule on that show, with weekend host Damhnait Doyle taking over that day. In September, after Just Asking was expanded to two hours, Doyle and Coelho fully exchanged duties on Mornings, with Doyle becoming the weekday host and Coelho transferring to weekends.
