= Talia Schlanger =

Canadian radio broadcaster

- Born: Talia Hannah Schlanger
- Occupations: Actress; broadcaster; singer-songwriter
- Known for: World Cafe, Radio 2 Morning

Talia Hannah Schlanger is a Canadian musician and radio broadcaster, who has worked in both Canada and the United States.

Formerly a weekend host of Radio 2 Morning on CBC Radio 2 and TV host of CBC Music Backstage Pass, and a part-time host on CBC Radio 3, her selection as host of NPR's music program World Cafe was announced in February 2017. She joined World Cafe in October 2016 as a contributing producer, and was named the program's new host after the retirement of David Dye. In June 2019, she announced her departure from the program to return to other creative projects. In September 2019, Raina Douris was announced as her successor.

Schlanger grew up in a Jewish family in Thornhill, Ontario. She is a graduate of Toronto Metropolitan University's program in radio and television arts. Prior to joining the Canadian Broadcasting Corporation, Schlanger was an actress, whose credits included the supporting role of Madison in Strange Days at Blake Holsey High, guest roles in System Crash and Degrassi: The Next Generation, and musical theatre roles in Mirvish Productions' Mamma Mia, the original Canadian company of Queen's We Will Rock You and the first national U.S. tour of Green Day's American Idiot.

She won a Canadian Screen Award in 2014 as a coproducer with Brent Hodge, Bryan Ward, Grant Lawrence and Kai Black of The Beetle Roadtrip Sessions, a web series on CBC Music in which Lawrence travelled across Canada meeting local musicians and other personalities.

Since leaving World Cafe, Schlanger has again been heard as a fill-in host on CBC Radio programming including Here and Now and Q.

Her debut album, Grace for the Going, was released on February 2, 2024. This included a song about Toughie, who was the last known frog of his species when he died in 2016.

In March 2026 it was announced that Schlanger will originate the role of Kate in the world premier of It's a Good Life if You Don't Weaken, a new musical based on the songs of The Tragically Hip, for Theatre Aquarius.
