= David Dye (broadcaster) =

American radio broadcaster

David Dye is an American radio broadcaster who hosted WXPN-FM's nationally syndicated music show World Cafe from 1991 to 2017.

Dye began his broadcasting career as a host on WMMR, a leading rock station in Philadelphia. He then worked for stations in Maine before returning to the Philadelphia market, where he hosted shows at WHYY-FM and WIOQ. He joined WXPN-FM in Philadelphia, in 1989, where he created World Cafe and oversaw the show's expansion into a nationally syndicated program airing on over 200 NPR stations.

Dye announced his retirement as host of World Cafe in 2016. He continues to host a weekly program on WXPN called "Dave's World", which airs on Sundays.
