= Raina Douris =

Canadian radio broadcaster (born 1986)

- Born: February 2, 1986 (age 40)
- Occupation: radio personality
- Known for: Mornings, World Cafe

Raina Douris (born February 2, 1986) is a Canadian radio broadcaster, currently working in the United States as the host of NPR's syndicated music program World Cafe.

Originally from Stouffville, Ontario, Douris studied radio and television broadcasting at Ryerson University, and interned with CFNY-FM (102.1 The Edge) in Toronto beginning in 2009. During her time with the station she launched its "Indie Online" feature, to provide exposure on the station's website to local indie rock bands who had not yet graduated to rotation in the station's regular playlist.

She left CFNY in 2012 to join CBC Radio 3, remaining with that service for about a year before joining Toronto's new CIND-FM (Indie 88). During her time with that station, she was named Best Local Radio Personality in NOW's annual Best of Toronto reader poll two years in a row.

She returned to the CBC in 2016, serving as host of CBC Music's national morning show Mornings and CBC Television's CBC Music Backstage Pass. She left CBC Music in September 2019, hosting her last episode of Mornings on September 13.

Douris was the host of the Polaris Music Prize galas in 2018 and 2019.

It was announced on September 18, 2019, that Douris would replace Talia Schlanger as lead host of World Cafe. She is the third full-time host in the program's history.
