= World Cafe (radio program) =

WXPN music radio program

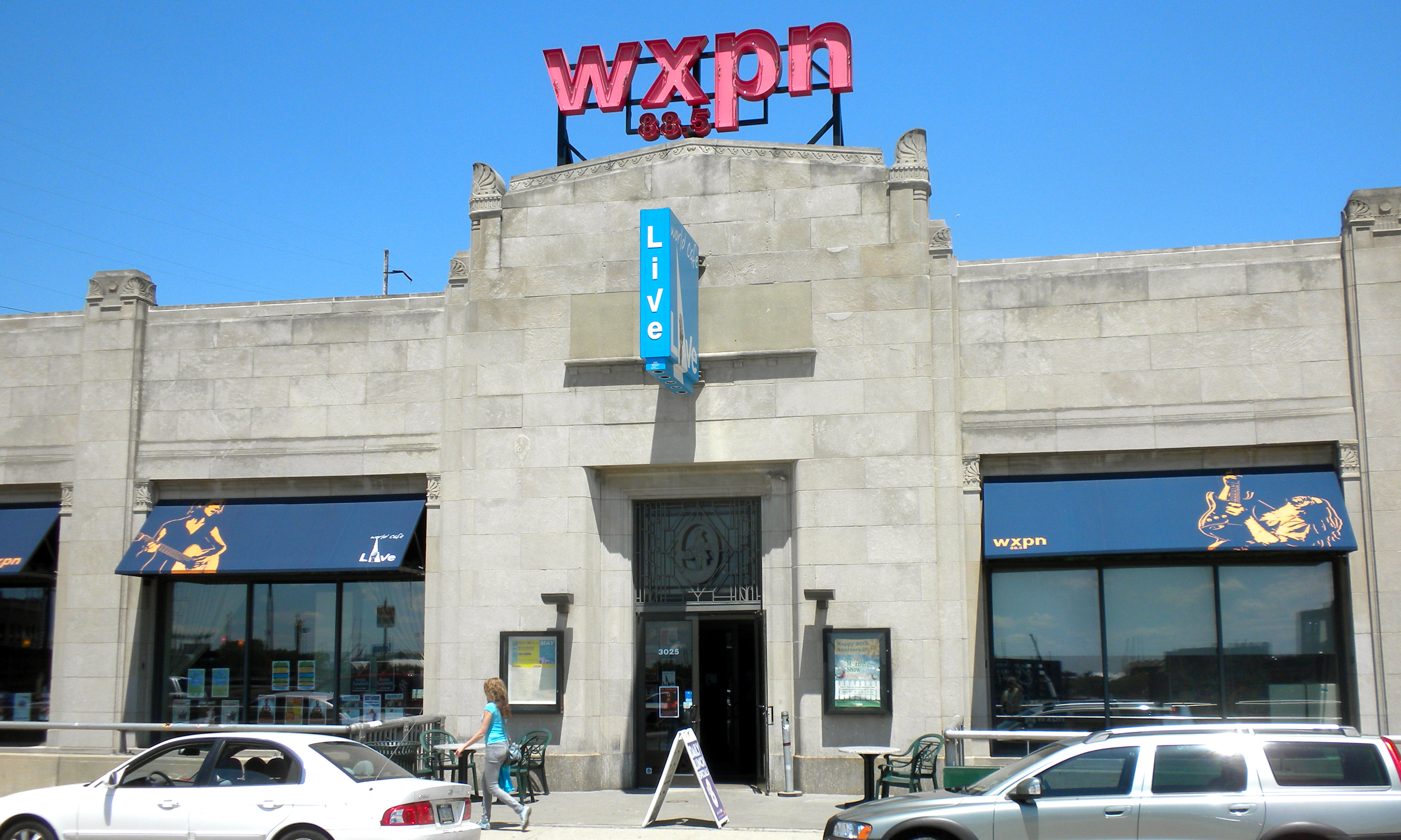
- The World Cafe Live venue at the former Hajoca Corp. showroom
- Genre: Music/Interview
- Running time: 2 hours, Monday-Friday
- Country of origin: United States
- Language: English
- Home station: WXPN 88.5 in Philadelphia, Pennsylvania
- Syndicates: Public Radio International (1991–2005); NPR (2005–present)
- Hosted by: David Dye (1991–2017); Talia Schlanger (2017–2019); Raina Douris (2019–present); Stephen Kallao (2017-present)
- Original release: 1991 – present
- Website: www.npr.org/sections/world-cafe/
- Podcast: World Cafe Podcasts

World Cafe is a two-hour-long, nationally syndicated music radio program that originates from WXPN, a non-commercial station licensed to the University of Pennsylvania in Philadelphia. The program began on October 14, 1991 and was originally distributed by Public Radio International. Since 2005, the show has been distributed by NPR.

== Background ==
World Cafe features live performances and interviews with established and emerging artists. The program's format covers a wide spectrum of musical genres, including indie rock, folk, hard rock, singer-songwriter, alt-country, and world music. The program produces two weekly podcasts containing interviews and information about musical performers: "World Cafe Words and Music," which features more established singers and bands, and "World Cafe Next," which highlights emerging artists.

Since the program's launch, World Cafe was hosted by David Dye. The program announced Talia Schlanger as its new host in February 2017. Dye continued as full-time host and producer of the radio show until March 31, 2017; he continued afterward as a part-time contributor to the program and sometime fill-in host. However, Schlanger guest-hosted some episodes in Dye's absence in advance of becoming the program's official host as of April 1. In June 2019, Schlanger announced her departure from the program, to return to other creative projects. In September 2019, the program announced Raina Douris as its new host, beginning October 7.

Other contributors to the program have included Michaela Majoun, Ann Powers and Stephen Kallao.

== Live at the World Cafe ==
Live at the World Cafe is an ongoing series of compilation albums showcasing artists that appear on the radio program. The first volume was published in 1995. As of 2021, the series consists of 46 volumes.
