= List of Canadian radio programs =

This is an incomplete list that is biased toward current and popular programming.

== 0-9 ==
- The 180
- 2 minutes du peuple
- 3 Guys on the Radio

== A ==
- À Propos
- Adler on Line
- Afghanada
- After Hours
- The Age of Persuasion
- And Sometimes Y
- The Arts Tonight
- As It Happens

== B ==
- Backbencher (2010-2011)
- Backstage with Ben Heppner
- Bandwidth
- Basic Black
- Because News
- Between the Covers
- Brave New Waves
- Bunny Watson

== C ==
- C'est formidable!
- C'est la Vie
- Canada Live (1992–1993)
- Canada Live (2007–)
- Canada Reads
- Canadia: 2056 (2007-2008)
- CBC Radio Overnight
- CBC Radio Three
- CBC Radio 3 Sessions
- CBC Wednesday Night
- Charles Adler Tonight (2016-2021)
- CHUM Chart
- Chatelaine Radio
- The Chuck Swirsky Show
- The Chumps Without a Net
- Commotion
- Cross Country Checkup
- The Current

== D ==
- Day 6
- The Dead Dog Café Comedy Hour
- The Debaters
- Definitely Not the Opera
- DiscDrive (2008)
- Dispatches
- Doc Mailloux
- The Doc Project
- Double Exposure

== E ==
- The Entertainers

== F ==
- Finkleman's 45s
- Frantic Times
- Freestyle
- Fuse

== G ==
- Gilmour's Albums
- Global Village
- Go
- The Great Eastern

== H ==
- The Happy Gang (1937-1959)
- High Definition
- The House

== I ==
- Ideas
- In the Key of Charles
- Inside the Music
- The Inside Track
- Inspector Maigret
- The Investigator (1954)
- The Irrelevant Show

== J ==
- Jake and the Kid
- Jazz Beat
- Johnny Chase: Secret Agent of Space (1978-1981)

== L ==
- Late Night Counsell
- Laugh out Loud
- Live Audio Wrestling
- Lovers and Other Strangers

== M ==
- Madly Off in All Directions
- Marvin's Room
- Medium Rare
- Metro Morning
- Mr. Interesting's Guide to the Continental United States
- Monday Night Playhouse
- Monsoon House
- Morningside (1976-1997)
- Music and Company
- The Mystery Project (1992-2002)

== N ==
- The National Playlist
- National Research Council Time Signal
- Nazi Eyes on Canada
- Nero Wolfe (a.k.a. Rex Stout's Nero Wolfe)
- The Next Chapter
- Nightfall (1980-1983)
- Night Lines
- Nightstream
- The Norm
- Northern Lights
- Now or Never

== O ==
- O'Reilly on Advertising
- The Ongoing History of New Music
- OnStage
- Ontario Morning
- Ontario Today
- OverDrive

== P ==
- Podcast Playlist
- The Point
- Prime Time
- Prime Time Sports

== Q ==
- Q
- Quirks and Quarks

== R ==
- The R3-30
- Radio 2 Morning
- Radio 2 Drive
- The Radio 2 Top 20
- Radio Free Vestibule
- The Radio Show
- RadioSonic (1997-2003)
- Rawhide
- RealTime
- The Review
- ReVision Quest
- Rewind
- The Roundup
- Royal Canadian Air Farce
- Running with Scissors with Mr. Interesting

== S ==
- Saturday Afternoon at the Opera
- Saturday Night Blues
- Search Engine
- Share the Wealth
- The Signal
- Simply Sean
- Sound Advice
- The Sound Lounge
- Sounds Like Canada
- Spark
- Steve, The First
- Steve, The Second
- The Story from Here
- Strike (2007)
- Studio Sparks
- The Sunday Edition
- Sunday Morning
- Sunday Night Sex Show
- Sunny Days and Nights

== T ==
- Talking Books
- Tapestry (CBC)
- Tapestry (CHFI)
- This Country in the Morning (1971-1974)
- This I Believe
- This Is That
- This Morning
- Tonic
- Trust Inc. (2012)

== U ==
- Under the Covers
- Unreserved

== V ==
- Vanishing Point (1984-1986)
- Variety Tonight
- The Vinyl Cafe (1994-2015)
- Vinyl Tap

== W ==
- Warren on the Weekend
- What a Week
- White Coat, Black Art
- WireTap
- The World at Six
- World Report
- Writers and Company

== See also ==
- List of UK radio programs
- List of US radio programs
- List of old-time radio people
