= List of CBC Radio programs =

This is a list of programs broadcast on the CBC Radio One and CBC Music networks of the Canadian Broadcasting Corporation.

== CBC Radio One ==
=== Current ===
- All in a Day
- All Points West
- As It Happens
- BC Today (BC Weekday Noon Show)
- Because News
- Bookends
- Canada Reads
- CBC Music: Live
- CBC Radio Overnight
- C'est formidable!
- Commotion
- The Cost of Living
- Crime Story
- Cross Country Checkup
- The Current
- Day 6
- Daybreak Montreal
- The Debaters
- Deep Dive
- The Early Edition (BC Weekday Morning Show)
- The Fisheries Broadcast (Newfoundland and Labrador only)
- Front Burner
- Here and Now
- The House
- Ideas
- Information Morning
- Inside the Music
- Just Asking
- Laugh Out Loud
- Maritime Noon
- Marvin's Room
- Massey Lectures
- Metro Morning
- More with Anna Maria Tremonti
- The Next Chapter
- North by Northwest (BC Weekend Morning Show)
- Now or Never
- Ontario Morning
- Ontario Today
- On The Coast (BC Weekday Afternoon Show)
- PlayMe
- Podcast Playlist
- Q
- Quirks & Quarks
- Reclaimed
- Someone Knows Something
- The Story from Here
- Storylines
- The Sunday Magazine
- Uncover
- Under the Influence
- Unreserved
- What on Earth
- White Coat, Black Art
- World Report
- The World This Hour
- Your World Tonight

=== Acquired programming ===
- All in the Mind
- Body Sphere
- Deutsche Welle's World Link
- Fifth Floor
- From Our Own Correspondent
- Future Tense
- HARDtalk
- Inside Europe
- Living Planet
- Monocle 24
- Radiolab
- The Science Hour
- Snap Judgment
- This American Life
- The World

=== Past ===
- 50 Tracks
- The 180
- À Propos
- Afghanada
- The Age of Persuasion
- And Sometimes Y
- The Arts Tonight
- Assignment
- Backbencher
- Bandwidth
- Basic Black
- Between the Covers
- Bunny Watson
- CBC Music Top 20
- CBC Wednesday Night (1941-1970s)
- C'est la vie
- Canada Live (1992–1993 program; the 2007– program by this name continues as CBC Music: Live)
- Canadia: 2056
- The Candy Palmater Show
- The Carson Family of Willowbrook Farms (1940)
- The Chumps Without a Net
- Crossing Boundaries
- The Dead Dog Café Comedy Hour
- Definitely Not the Opera
- Dispatches
- The Doc Project
- Double Exposure
- Eclectic Circus
- The Entertainers
- Finkleman's 45s
- Frantic Times
- Freestyle
- Fuse
- Gabereau
- Gilmour's Albums
- Global Village
- Go
- The Great Eastern
- The Happy Gang
- Here Come the Seventies
- High Definition
- The Inside Track
- The Investigator
- The Irrelevant Show
- Jake and the Kid
- Johnny Chase: Secret Agent of Space
- The Late Show
- Laugh in a Half
- London After Dark
- Madly Off in All Directions
- The Max Ferguson Show
- Monsoon House
- Morningside
- Mostly Water Theatre
- Mr. Interesting's Guide to the Continental United States
- The Mystery Project
- National Farm Radio Forum (1941–1965)
- The National Playlist
- Nero Wolfe
- Nightfall
- The Norm
- Northern Lights
- O'Reilly on Advertising
- OnStage
- Opportunity Knocks (1947–1957)
- Out in the Open (2016–2020)
- The Point
- Prime Time
- Promised Land
- Radio Free Vestibule
- The Radio Show
- Rawhide
- Randy Bachman's Vinyl Tap (2005–2021)
- ReVision Quest
- Rewind
- The Roundup
- Royal Canadian Air Farce
- Running with Scissors with Mr. Interesting
- Search Engine
- Seven Wonders of Canada
- Share the Wealth (1940s)
- Singing Stars of Tomorrow (1943–1956)
- Sounds Like Canada (2002–2008)
- Spark
- Swinging on a Star (1989-1994)
- The State We're In (2009–2013)
- Steve, The First
- Steve, The Second
- The Strand
- The Sunday Edition
- Sunday Morning
- Sunday Showcase
- Sunny Days and Nights
- Talking Books
- Tapestry
- This Country in the Morning
- This I Believe
- This Is That
- This Morning
- Trust Inc.
- Under the Covers
- University of the Air
- Vanishing Point
- Variety Tonight
- The Vinyl Cafe
- What a Week
- Winnipeg Comedy Festival
- WireTap
- Writers & Company

== CBC Music ==
=== Current ===
- About Time
- After Dark
- Backstage with Ben Heppner
- The Block
- Canada Live
- CBC Music Top 20
- Centre Stage
- C'est formidable!
- Choral Concert
- Deep Dive
- Drive
- Frequencies
- In Concert
- Inside the Music
- Marvin's Room
- Mornings
- My Playlist
- Reclaimed
- Saturday Afternoon at the Opera
- Saturday Night Blues
- Saturday Night Jazz
- The Strombo Show
- Tempo

=== Past ===
- À Propos
- After Hours
- As You Like It
- Brave New Waves (1984–2007)
- Bunny Watson
- Deep Roots
- DiscDrive
- Global Village
- In Performance
- In the Key of Charles
- Jazz Beat
- Mid Morning
- Music and Company
- Music for a While
- Night Lines (1982–1997)
- Northern Lights
- RSVP
- Off the Record
- Q the Music
- RadioSonic/CBC Radio 3 (1997–2007)
- RealTime
- Shift
- The Signal
- Sound Advice
- Stereo Morning
- Studio Sparks
- That Time of the Night
- Tonic
- Two New Hours
