= List of Canadian radio personalities =

This is a list of Canadian radio personalities.

== A ==
- Charles Adler
- Jerry Agar
- Ismaila Alfa
- Tom Allen
- Steve Anthony
- Paul Arcand
- Peter Armstrong
- André Arthur

== B ==
- Aaron Badgley
- Brent Bambury
- Carl Banas
- Andy Barrie
- Marie-France Bazzo
- Stephanie Beard
- Jaymz Bee
- Paul Bellini
- Ralph Benmergui
- Avril Benoît
- Dorothée Berryman
- Dennis Beyak
- Ferdinand Biondi
- Arthur Black
- DJ Blitz
- Dean Blundell
- Al Boliska
- Dave Bookman
- Joe Bowen
- Dave Brindle
- Craig Bromell
- Harry Brown
- Jim Brown
- Robin Brown
- Barbara Budd

== C ==
- Stan Carew
- Bill Carroll
- Maggie Cassella
- Rita Celli
- Dave Chalk
- Christiane Charette
- Piya Chattopadhyay
- Wei Chen
- Lisa Christiansen
- Christy Clark
- Saroja Coelho
- Leon Cole
- Carla Collins
- Scruff Connors
- Michael Coren
- Kevin Courrier
- Gavin Crawford
- Alan Cross

== D ==
- Reza Dahya
- Erin Davis
- Mark Day
- Gill Deacon
- Marc Denis
- Marilyn Denis
- Bernard Derome
- John Derringer
- Jeff Douglas
- Raina Douris
- Darren Dreger
- Dan Dunleavy
- Dan Duran
- Josie Dye
- Jesse Dylan

== E ==
- Mark Elliot
- Michael Enright
- Mary Jo Eustace

== F ==
- Jane Farrow
- Laura Fernandez
- Mary Lou Finlay
- Robert Fisher
- Martina Fitzgerald
- Andy Frost
- Barbara Frum

== G ==
- Vicki Gabereau
- Matt Galloway
- Lana Gay
- Jian Ghomeshi
- Clyde Gilmour
- "Humble Howard" Glassman
- Dale Goldhawk
- Jurgen Gothe
- Jane Gray
- Bradley Green
- Lowell Green
- Lorne Greene
- David Grierson
- Peter Gzowski

== H ==
- Marie-Lynn Hammond
- Keith Hampshire
- Adrian Harewood
- Tom Harrington
- Jane Hawtin
- Foster Hewitt
- Maureen Holloway
- Chris Howden
- Rick Howe

== I ==
- Mary Ito
- Steve Ivings

== J ==
- Niki Jabbour
- Don Jackson
- Doug James
- Stu Jeffries
- Molly Johnson
- Taborah Johnson

== K ==
- Linda Kash
- Paul Kennedy
- Cory Kimm
- Wab Kinew
- Leora Kornfeld
- Ken Kostick
- Andrew Krystal

== L ==
- Anne Lagacé Dowson
- Grant Lawrence
- Sook-Yin Lee
- Marilyn Lightstone

== M ==
- Bob Mackowycz
- Pierre Mailloux
- Rafe Mair
- Alan Maitland
- John Majhor
- Rebecca Makonnen
- Katie Malloch
- Jeff Marek
- MC Mario
- David Marsden
- Pat Marsden
- Bob McAdorey
- Stuart McLean
- Bernie McNamee
- Casey Mecija
- Kim Mitchell
- Alain Montpetit
- John Moore
- Terry Moore
- Terry David Mulligan
- Rex Murphy

== N ==
- Alan Neal
- Julie Nesrallah
- Craig Norris

== O ==
- Carol Off

== P ==
- Candy Palmater
- Amanda Parris
- Fred Patterson
- Lise Payette
- Deb Pearce
- Holger Petersen
- Kathleen Petty
- Geoff Pevere
- Cameron Phillips
- Catherine Pogonat
- Ross Porter
- Tom Power
- Amanda Putz

== R ==
- Jim Ralph
- Sean Rameswaram
- Jim Richards
- Bill Richardson
- Erika Ritter
- Leslie Roberts
- Tom Roberts
- Ken Rockburn
- Shelagh Rogers
- Richard Ryder

== S ==
- Denis St-Jules
- Bernard St-Laurent
- Simi Sara
- Patti Schmidt
- Dave Seglins
- Shad
- Tetsuro Shigematsu
- Peter Shurman
- Gordon Sinclair
- Lister Sinclair
- Richard Z. Sirois
- Alison Smith
- Shelley Solmes
- Martin Streek
- George Stroumboulopoulos
- Kevin Sylvester

== T ==
- Tim Tamashiro
- Jowi Taylor
- Rich Terfry
- Angeline Tetteh-Wayoe
- John Tory
- Anna Maria Tremonti

== V ==
- Gene Valaitis

== W ==
- Bill Walker
- Bill Watters
- Justin "Drex" Wilcomes
- Odario Williams
- David Wisdom
- Ted Woloshyn
- Cajjmere Wray

== Y ==
- Nora Young
