= David Grierson =

Canadian broadcaster

- Born: February 19, 1955; Toronto, Ontario, Canada
- Died: November 20, 2004 (aged 49); Vancouver, British Columbia, Canada
- Education: British Columbia Institute of Technology
- Occupation: broadcaster

David Alan Grierson (February 19, 1955 – November 20, 2004) was a Canadian radio broadcaster, best known as a host of national and local programming for CBC Radio.

He was born in Toronto in 1955 and graduated from the broadcasting program at the British Columbia Institute of Technology, as well as training as a classical clarinetist.

== Broadcasting ==
Grierson began working in broadcasting as a radio producer and programming director for commercial radio stations in Vancouver, including CHQM-FM and CJAZ-FM.

Grierson was a weekly columnist and co-host of Sunday Arts/Entertainment, as well as a contributor to Good Rockin' Tonite and The Journal on CBC Television. His series The Performers ran on CTV and Turner Network Television.

In the late 1980s, Grierson hosted The Arts Report, CBC Stereo's national morning arts newscast. In 1991, he succeeded Bob Oxley as host of Stereo Morning, the network's main morning program, until leaving in 1992 to take a position with network station CBU in Vancouver. He worked as a staff announcer for the station until 1997, when he became the host and producer of North by Northwest, the station's weekend morning show.

In December 2000, he left NXNW to take over from Lisa Cordasco as host of CBCV-FM's On the Island, the network's morning show for Vancouver Island. He hosted On the Island until his death in 2004.

Grierson was also a contributor to other network programming including Westcoast Performance, Richardson's Roundup, Morningside, Gabereau, Sunday Morning, Prime Time, Arts National, Sunday Matinee, Vanishing Point and DiscDrive. He was also the voice of the National Research Council Time Signal.

== Other activities ==
Grierson wrote The Expo Celebration, a retrospective book featuring the work of more than 50 of Canada's top photographers. A passion for jazz music saw him create and write a weekly column called "The Jazz Life" for the Georgia Straight, and his feature writing on music appeared in publications including Down Beat, Swing Journal, Canadian Musician and Western Living.

In 1993 and 1994, he won two successive songwriting competitions staged by the Vancouver Sun, the first time with a rewrite of Julia Ward Howe's The Battle Hymn of the Republic as a tribute to the Vancouver Folk Music Festival, and the second with a rewrite of Bob Dylan's "Blowin' in the Wind" as a song about the 1994 Vancouver Stanley Cup riot. Both songs were submitted under pseudonyms, and on both occasions he donated his prize, a family pass to the folk festival, to a family who could not otherwise afford to attend.

A frequent juror for creative competitions, Grierson was a charter member of the Writers Guild of Canada, one of the founding members of the British Columbia chapter of the Canadian Academy of Recording Arts and Sciences, and sat on the board of directors of the Vancouver Folk Music Festival.

== Death ==
He died of an apparent heart attack on November 20, 2004.
