= List of science fiction TV and radio shows produced in Canada =

Canadian science fiction television and Radio

The following science-fiction TV shows and radio programs have been produced exclusively or mostly in Canada. (Science-fiction related genres include Fantasy, Horror, and Supernatural.) Many of these programs have been run and/or produced by American or other international production companies. (See Canadian science fiction for more information.) Series in bold have the in-universe story take place in Canada or have Canadian characters in them.

== Live action science fiction television drama series ==
=== 1950s debuts ===
- Space Command (1953)
- The Man from Tomorrow (1958)

=== 1970s debuts ===
- The Hilarious House of Frightenstein (1971)
- The Starlost (1973)
- Peep Show (1975)
- Read All About It! (1979)

=== 1980s debuts ===
- The Hitchhiker (1983)
- Friday the 13th: The Series (1985)
- The New Alfred Hitchcock Presents (1985)
- The Ray Bradbury Theater (1985)
- Airwolf (1987)
- Captain Power (1987)
- Earth Star Voyager (1988)
- My Secret Identity (1988)
- War of the Worlds (1988)

=== 1990s debuts ===
- Counterstrike (1990)
- Maniac Mansion (1990)
- Beyond Reality (1991)
- The Hidden Room (1991)
- Forever Knight (1992)
- Highlander: The Series (1992)
- Nightmare Cafe (1992)
- The Odyssey (1992)
- Matrix (1993)
- The X-Files (1993) first five seasons filmed in Vancouver, later seasons in Los Angeles
- M.A.N.T.I.S. (1994)
- Robocop: The Series (1994)
- TekWar (1994)
- Viper (1994)
- Deepwater Black (1995)
- Mysterious Island (1995)
- The Outer Limits (1995)
- Sliders (1995) first two seasons filmed in Vancouver, later seasons in Los Angeles
- Strange Luck (1995)
- VR.5 (1995)
- Poltergeist: The Legacy (1996)
- The Pretender (1996)
- Profit (1996)
- Psi Factor: Chronicles of the Paranormal (1996)
- The Sentinel (1996)
- Space Cases (1996)
- Cloned (1997)
- Doomsday Rock (1997)
- Earth: Final Conflict (1997)
- Honey, I Shrunk the Kids: The TV Show (1997)
- Lexx (1997)
- Night Man (1997)
- Ninja Turtles: The Next Mutation (1997)
- Sleepwalkers (1997)
- Stargate SG-1 (1997)
- Animorphs (1998)
- Eerie, Indiana: The Other Dimension (1998)
- First Wave (1998)
- Highlander: The Raven (1998)
- Mercy Point (1998)
- Seven Days (1998) 1st season in California, later season in Vancouver
- Welcome to Paradox (1998)
- BeastMaster (1999)
- Big Wolf on Campus (1999)
- Code Name: Eternity (1999)
- Harsh Realm (1999)
- Relic Hunter (1999)
- Strange World (1999)
- Sir Arthur Conan Doyle's The Lost World (1999)
- So Weird (1999)
- Total Recall 2070 (1999)

=== 2000s debuts ===
- Andromeda (2000)
- Dark Angel (2000)
- Freedom (2000)
- The Immortal (2000)
- Level 9 (2000)
- Mysterious Ways (2000)
- The Others (2000) Pilot filmed in Vancouver, the rest of the season's in California.
- The Secret Adventures of Jules Verne (2000)
- Sole Survivor (2000)
- The Zack Files (2000)
- The Chronicle (2001)
- The Lone Gunmen (2001)
- Mutant X (2001)
- MythQuest (2001)
- Night Visions (2001)
- Smallville (2001)
- Special Unit 2 (2001)
- Starhunter (2001)
- Tracker (2001)
- Vampire High (2001)
- Wolf Lake (2001)
- 2030 CE (2002)
- The Dead Zone (2002) For the sixth season, production moved to Montreal.
- Galidor: Defenders of the Outer Dimension (2002)
- Haunted (2002)
- Jeremiah (2002)
- John Doe (2002)
- Odyssey 5 (2002)
- Strange Days at Blake Holsey High (2002)
- Taken (2002)
- Alienated (2003)
- Jake 2.0 (2003)
- Miracles (2003)
- The Twilight Zone (2003)
- The 4400 (2004)
- Battlestar Galactica (2004)
- The Collector (2004)
- Kingdom Hospital (2004)
- ReGenesis (2004)
- Stargate Atlantis (2004)
- Charlie Jade (2005)
- Supernatural (2005)
- Tru Calling (2005)
- Blade: The Series (2006)
- EUReKA (2006)
- Kyle XY (2006)
- Masters of Science Fiction (2006)
- Three Moons Over Milford (2006)
- A.M.P.E.D (2007)
- Bionic Woman (2007)
- Blood Ties (2007)
- Dinosapien (2007)
- Flash Gordon (2007)
- Grand Star (2007)
- Painkiller Jane (2007)
- Reaper (2007)
- Unnatural History (2007)
- The Andromeda Strain (2008)
- Caprica (2008)
- Fear Itself (2008)
- Fringe (2008) Pilot filmed in Toronto, 1st season in New York City, later seasons in Vancouver
- Sanctuary (2008)
- Aaron Stone (2009)
- Being Erica (2009)
- Defying Gravity (2009)
- Harper's Island (2009)
- The Listener (2009)
- Stargate Universe (2009)
- Storm World (2009)
- The Troop (2009)
- Warehouse 13 (2009)

=== 2010s debuts ===
- Haven (2010)
- Les Rescapés (2010)
- Lost Girl (2010)
- R.L. Stine's The Haunting Hour (2010)
- Tower Prep (2010)
- Alcatraz (2012)
- Arrow (2012)
- Continuum (2012)
- Primeval New World (2012)
- Defiance (2013)
- Orphan Black (2013)
- The Tomorrow People (2013)
- The 100 (2014)
- Ascension (2014)
- The Flash (2014)
- Helix (2014)
- 12 Monkeys (2015)
- Between (2015)
- Dark Matter (2015)
- The Expanse (2015)
- Killjoys (2015)
- Minority Report (2015)
- Olympus (2015)
- Travelers (2016)
- Van Helsing (2016)
- Wynonna Earp (2016)

=== 2020s debuts ===
- Utopia Falls (2020)

== Documentaries/Newsmagazine shows ==
- The Nature of Things (1960)
- Science Magazine (1975)
- Science International (1976)
- Prisoners of Gravity (1989)
- The Anti Gravity Room (1996)
- 2001: A Space Road Odyssey (2001)
- HypaSpace (2002)
- Proof Positive (2004)
- Beyond, The Series (2005)
- Shadow Hunter (2005)

== French-language shows ==
- Lunatiques (1999)
- Dans une galaxie près de chez vous (1998)

== Animation ==
- The Marvel Superheroes (1966)
- Rocket Robin Hood (1966)
- Spider-Man (1967)
- Inspector Gadget (1983)
- ReBoot (1993)
- Tales from the Cryptkeeper (1993)
- Beast Wars (1996)
- Robocop: Alpha Commando (1998)
- Shadow Raiders (1998)
- Beast Machines (1999)
- Action Man (2000)
- Heavy Gear (2001)
- Xcalibur (2001)
- Kaput & Zösky: The Ultimate Obliterators (2002)
- Spider-Man: The New Animated Series (2003)
- Atomic Betty (2004)
- Dark Oracle (2004)
- Delta State (2004)
- Dragon Booster (2004)
- Tripping the Rift (2004)
- Zeroman (2004)
- Zixx (2004)
- Get Ed (2005)
- Station X (2005)
- Di-Gata Defenders (2006)
- Spider Riders (2006)
- Storm Hawks (2007)
- Bakugan Battle Brawlers (2008)
- Escape from Planet Earth (2009)
- Max Steel (2013)
- Bakugan: Battle Planet (2018)

== Radio ==
- Nazi Eyes on Canada (1942) CBC radio series
- Johnny Chase: Secret Agent of Space (1978) CBC radio series
- Nightfall (1980) CBC radio series
- Vanishing Point (1984) CBC radio series
- Soundings (1985) radio drama produced by Jeff Green, originally aired on CHEZ 106 and later CBC
- Faster Than Light (2002) CBC radio pilot (broadcast Sept 22nd, 2002 on Sunday Showcase (in mono) and again Sept 23rd on Monday Night Playhouse (in stereo).
- Canadia: 2056 (2007) CBC radio series

== Telefilms ==
- The Incredible Hulk Returns (1988)
- Bionic Showdown: The Six Million Dollar Man and the Bionic Woman (1989)
- The Trial of the Incredible Hulk (1989)
- The Death of the Incredible Hulk (1990)
- It (1990)
- TekWar: TekJustice (1994)
- TekWar: TekLab (1994)
- TekWar: TekLords (1994)
- Tekwar: The Movie (1994)
- Generation X (1996)
- Trilogy of Terror II (1996)
- Nick Fury: Agent of S.H.I.E.L.D. (1998)
- Atomic Train (1999)
- Ginger Snaps (2000)
- RoboCop: Prime Directives (2000)
- The Pretender 2001 (2001)
- The Pretender: Island of the Haunted (2001)
- Babylon 5: The Legend of the Rangers (2002)
- Carrie (2002)
- Saint Sinner (2002)
- A Wrinkle in Time (2003)
- Hot Wheels Highway 35 World Race (2003)
- 5ive Days to Midnight (2004)
- Decoys (2004)
- Earthsea (2004)
- Ginger Snaps: Unleashed (2004)
- Ginger Snaps Back: The Beginning (2004)
- Meltdown (2004) (2004)
- Snakehead Terror (2004)
- Acceleracers: Speed of Silence (2005)
- Deadly Skies (2005)
- The Last Templar (2005)
- Painkiller Jane (2005)
- Rapid Fire (2005)
- AcceleRacers: Breaking Point (2006)
- AcceleRacers: The Ultimate Race (2006)
- Earthstorm (2006)
- Savage Planet (2006)
- Fire Serpent (2007)
- KAW (2007)
- Tin Man (2007)
- Swamp Devil (2008)
- The Phantom (2009)
- Virtuality (2009)
- Paradox (2010)

== Web series ==
- Sanctuary (2007)

== See also ==
- Canadian science fiction
