= CBC.ca =

Online service of the Canadian Broadcasting Corporation

- Website type: Online newspaper
- Available in: English
- Owner: Canadian Broadcasting Corporation (CBC/Radio-Canada)
- Creator: Canadian Broadcasting Corporation
- Revenue: >$1 billion
- Website: www.cbc.ca ici.radio-canada.ca
- Commercial: No
- Registration: Optional
- Launched: 1993; 33 years ago
- Current status: Active

CBC.ca is the English-language online service of the Canadian Broadcasting Corporation. It was introduced in 1996. Under its previous names, the CBC's online service first went live in 1993.

The web-based service of the CBC is one of Canada's most visited web sites. It currently contains over one million pages of information.

The CBC also runs the French-language website Ici.Radio-Canada.ca.

== History ==
In 1993, the CBC launched an experimental web service, followed by a small site supporting CBC Radio and a site supporting the CBC Halifax TV program Street Cents. By 1995, the CBC had consolidated its English radio and TV sites into a single website.

Around 1996, the CBC began offering 24-hour live streaming of its radio services using RealAudio. The next year, the CBC launched CBC Kids and covered its first federal election online. The CBC launched its news site the following year.

In 2000, the CBC launched a wireless service and CBC Radio 3, an Internet-exclusive broadband magazine. Radio 3 provides streaming audio devoted to youth culture and independent music and is operated by CBC Radio.

In 2001, cbc.ca finished a major redesign that modernized the news portal and earned an English Television Award.

In 2005, production of the Radio 3 magazine was suspended, although the site continues in podcast format. Some of its programming still aired as a Saturday-evening show on CBC Radio Two until March 2007. Bande à part is the French equivalent and also airs content as a weekend program on Espace Musique. Both services launched as full channels on Sirius Canada in December 2005 and are also available to U.S. Sirius subscribers.

== Ici.Radio-Canada.ca ==
Radio-Canada.ca is the French Language online service run by Société Radio-Canada, the French counterpart of the CBC.

In June 2013, the CBC announced that Radio-Canada's website was to be moved to ICI.ca in October 2013, as part of wide plan to re-brand all of the CBC's French-language outlets under a common brand, replacing "Radio-Canada" with "Ici" as its main public-facing brand. However, following public backlash for its decision to drop the historic Radio-Canada name, the site has maintained its current domain name, but is branded in logos as ici.radio-canada.ca, and Ici.ca redirects to the site.

== Content ==
Previous CBC.ca logo

The websites include news from the CBC News website, an extensive sports section, music, science, technology and entertainment pages. CBC/Radio-Canada also offers an extensive, free archives service showcasing pivotal moments in Canadian history from the 1930s on. Over 8,000 online clips and interviews from news and information programs provide an in-depth look at Canada's past.

In 2004, the CBC began offering RSS feeds, and in 2005, it launched a new online arts and entertainment magazine.

In 2006, CBC.ca underwent another redesign after extensive study, with improvements to standards compliance.

In March 2008, the website added a comments section to most news items, allowing feedback on stories.

== Podcasting ==
In 2005, the CBC began podcasting some of its programs as a pilot project, including CBC Radio One's national science and technology program, Quirks and Quarks, CBC Radio 3's Canadian Music Podcast, and limited podcasting of CBLA's popular Metro Morning show.

In May 2006, the CBC added several more podcasts, including Dispatches, best-of editions of Outfront, As It Happens, Ideas, The Current and Definitely Not the Opera, weekly podcasts from regional radio stations and Editor's Choice, a daily showcase of notable network programming.

== Awards ==
In 2003, the CBC won an Online News Association award in the "service journalism" category for its coverage of the SARS epidemic. In 2004, CBC.ca was the only organization to win two awards from the Online News Association – one in the "specialty journalism" category for Canada Votes, its coverage of the 2004 Canadian federal election, and one in the "service journalism" category for ADR Database, a project from the CBC News investigative unit. CBC.ca was also a finalist in the "online commentary" category for "Words: Woes and Wonder", a series of columns about the English language.

In 2007, CBCNews.ca won the 2006 RTNDA award for best overall use of new media in Canada.
