= Cameron Phillips =

Cameron Phillips may refer to:

- Cameron (Terminator), a fictional character in Terminator: The Sarah Connor Chronicles
- Cameron Phillips (broadcaster) (born 1969), Canadian radio broadcaster
