= High-definition radio =

High-definition radio may refer to:

- High Definition (radio program), Canadian radio program, debuted February 4, 2006
- HD Radio, brand name of a method of digital transmission of AM and FM radio stations
