= Rick MacInnes-Rae =

Canadian radio journalist

- Occupation: radio journalist
- Known for: Dispatches

Rick MacInnes-Rae is a Canadian radio journalist, known as a longtime reporter and host on CBC Radio. An investigative journalist and foreign correspondent for the network, he was the host of the documentary series Dispatches from 2001 to 2012.

Beginning his career with the Canadian Broadcasting Corporation in 1976, he worked as a local reporter in various Canadian cities before becoming an international war correspondent in the 1980s, including reports from El Salvador, Chechnya, Gaza, Northern Ireland, the Persian Gulf, Mali, Panama, Zambia, Zimbabwe and Bosnia.

In 1993, he won an award from the Canadian Association of Journalists for his five-part series on the rise of the radical right. In 1996, he won the Citation for Excellence Under Fire award from the Bayeux-Calvados Awards for war correspondents for his coverage of Operation Grapes of Wrath in Lebanon. He has won three Amnesty International Media Awards, in 1997 for his series of news reports "Exodus from Zaire", in 1999 for "Kosovo Reports" and in 2007 for his Dispatches documentary "The Paradox of Democracy".

Dispatches was launched on CBC Radio in 2001. The program was cancelled in 2012, although MacInnes-Rae remained with the network in other roles, including continued international affairs reporting and stints as a guest host on The Current and As It Happens.

MacInnes-Rae announced his retirement from the network in July 2014. His future plans include writing a book about a distant ancestor.
