= The Chumps Without a Net =

Canadian sketch comedy radio show

The Chumps Without a Net was a half-hour sketch comedy show aired on CBC Radio in 1996 and 1997. The show aired on CBC Radio One on Saturday afternoons as a segment on Definitely Not the Opera, and on CBC Stereo on Saturday evenings as a segment on RealTime.

The troupe was based out of Toronto and consisted of Garry Campbell, Moira Dunphy, Dave Healey, Lisa Merchant, Gary Pearson, Jerry Schaefer, and Warren Wilson.

They started out on radio by first appearing on Definitely Not the Opera in 1995. They rose out of the improv comedy circuit, and were best known for parodies of such shows as Wheel of Jeopardy, Star Trek, The X-Files and the movie Blazing Saddles.

== Discography ==
- The Chumps Without a Net 1996
