= Jowi Taylor =

Jowi Taylor (born June 15, 1962) is a Toronto-based radio personality, public speaker and originator of the Six String Nation guitar, also known as Voyageur.

As a radio broadcaster, producer, writer and host, Taylor is known for his work at CBC Radio's weekly music and news programme, Global Village, which ran from 1997 to 2007. He also hosted and co-produced the eight-part series The Wire: The Impact of Electricity on Music, and its follow-up six-part series The Nerve: Music and the Human Experience with Chris Brookes and Paolo Pietropaolo. For his work in radio, he has received the Prix Italia, a Gabriel Award, a New York Festivals Award, and a Peabody Award.

== Early influences ==
Taylor's interest in writing began in Toronto's Victoria Park Secondary School with the influence of a series of Writers-in-Residence programmes, including CanLit notables Katherine Govier, David McFadden and Christopher Dewdney. While in high school, he participated in author and playwright David Young's "Dream Class" for gifted writers.

== Radio career ==
While studying Linguistics at the University of Toronto, Taylor took up radio hosting as a volunteer at Ryerson Polytechnical Institute's campus-community radio station CKLN-FM. A break in studies took him to Thailand for a year, where he hosted a daily radio show at WNSP 107 in Bangkok. Returning to complete his degree at the University of Toronto, he resumed duties at CKLN-FM as host of From There To Hear, a weekly world music show.

In 1997, Taylor was chosen to host a new CBC radio show called Global Village. Over its decade on-air, Global Village garnered numerous international awards, including the Prix Italia, the Gabriel Award, the New York Festivals Award and several prizes from Germany's Deutsche Welle Radio.

At the same time, Taylor began work on other radio projects within CBC. His first series with co-producers Paolo Pietropaolo and Chris Brookes, The Wire: The Impact of Electricity on Music, won a 2005 Peabody Award, a Prix Italia, a New York Festivals Award, and the Third Coast International Audio Festival Director's Choice Award. Their next team project, Invisible Cities: Toronto also earned a New York Festivals prize, and their Wire follow-up series The Nerve: Music and the Human Experience was nominated for a Peabody and won a 2009 New York Festivals Award.

Following the cancellation of Global Village in March 2007, and as part of the broadcaster's format change of CBC Radio 2, Taylor was assigned to write the short-lived CBC Radio 2 blog and then hosted the overnight music show Nightstream.

Taylor left the CBC at the end of 2008, though both The Wire and The Nerve are re-broadcast periodically on CBC Radio.

== Six String Nation ==
Conceived in 1995, the Six String Nation project - a guitar built from pieces of historical and cultural material from every part of Canada - took 11 years to come to completion.

It debuted before a crowd of 80,000 people on Parliament Hill in Ottawa on Canada Day 2006. Since then, Voyageur (the guitar's official nickname) has travelled well over 200,000 km across the country appearing at festivals, conferences, concerts and schools. It's been played by hundreds of musicians and been held by thousands of Canadians in a series of some 50,000 portraits taken by the project's official photographer, Doug Nicholson.

The story of the guitar and a selection of those portraits was the subject of Taylor's 2009 book for publisher Douglas & McIntyre, Six String Nation: 64 Pieces. 6 Strings. 1 Canada. 1 Guitar.

The project is also the subject of a unique 2009 commemorative coin in the shape of a guitar-pick from the Royal Canadian Mint.

== Public speaking and other engagements ==
Taylor continues to travel across Canada and internationally, participating in music and cultural festivals, giving keynote conference addresses and school presentations, and making the guitar available to musicians for live performances.

Taylor is represented by the National Speakers Bureau for corporate engagements, and by Mariposa in the Schools for school visits.
