= Bill Richardson (broadcaster) =

Canadian radio broadcaster and author (born 1955)

Bill Richardson (born 1955 in Winnipeg, Manitoba) is a Canadian radio broadcaster and author.

Richardson received his B.A. from the University of Winnipeg in 1976. After spending a year in Montpellier, he moved to Vancouver, where he completed a Master of Library Science at the University of British Columbia. He received an honorary doctorate from Wilfrid Laurier University in Waterloo, Ontario, June 2017.

He was a long-time broadcaster on CBC Radio One, beginning in 1992 as a regular contributor and guest host on Vicki Gabereau's show. When Gabereau left to host a television show on CTV, Richardson moved over to CBC Radio Two to host As You Like It, a classical music request show. In 1997 he returned to CBC Radio One to become host of Richardson's Roundup.

He began hosting a new show, Bunny Watson, in 2004, and was replaced as host of The Roundup by Tetsuro Shigematsu. During the CBC staff lockout of 2005, he noted in the CBC Unplugged staff podcast that he has spent his entire time as a CBC host on contract, rather than as a permanent employee. CBC's labour troubles resulted in his return to the air via reruns of The Roundup. He was also a frequent guest host of Sounds Like Canada, moderated CBC's annual Canada Reads from 2003 to 2007, and was the host of Saturday Afternoon at the Opera and Sunday Afternoon in Concert from 2007 until 2013.

Richardson's book Bachelor Brothers' Bed and Breakfast won the Stephen Leacock Medal for Humour in 1994.

Richardson now makes regular appearances on Knowledge Network for its fundraising.

He is currently working on a musical based on Craigslist ads entitled do you want what I have got? a Craigslist Cantata with Veda Hille and Amiel Gladstone.

== Bibliography ==
- Canada Customs: Droll Recollections, Musings and Quibbles (1988) ISBN 0-921304-01-3
- Queen of all the dustballs: and other epics of everyday life (1990) ISBN 0-919591-98-1
- Come into my parlour: cautionary verses and instructive tales for the new millennium (1994) ISBN 0-919591-85-X
- Guy to Goddess: An Intimate Look at Drag Queens (1994) ISBN 0-89815-645-9
- Bachelor Brothers' Bed and Breakfast (1993) ISBN 1-55054-112-9
- Bachelor Brothers Bed & Breakfast Pillow Book (1995) ISBN 1-55054-439-X
- Bachelor Brothers' bedside companion (1996) ISBN 1-55054-517-5
- Scorned and beloved: dead of winter meetings with Canadian eccentrics (1997) ISBN 0-676-97079-6
- Oddball@large (1998) ISBN 1-55054-626-0
- Great Canadian books of the century: Vancouver Public Library (1999) ISBN 1-55054-736-4
- After Hamelin (2000) ISBN 1-55037-629-2
- Waiting for Gertrude: A Graveyard Gothic (2001) ISBN 1-55054-892-1
- Dear Sad Goat: a roundup of truly Canadian tales & letters (2002) ISBN 1-55054-960-X
- Sally Dog Little (2002) ISBN 1-55037-759-0
- But If They Do (2003) ISBN 1-55037-787-6
- Sally Dog Little Undercover Agent (2003) ISBN 1-55037-825-2
- (foreword by Bill Richardson) Character parts: who's really who in CanLit (2003) ISBN 0-676-97578-X
- Old Father William's Well-Ordered Universe (2008) ISBN 978-1-55468-024-5
- I Saw Three Ships – Westend Stories (2019) ISBN 978-1-77201-233-0
