= Cameron Phillips (broadcaster) =

Canadian radio broadcaster (born 1969)

Cameron Phillips (born April 10, 1969) is a Canadian radio broadcaster, best known as the co-host of CBC Radio One's Freestyle. Over his CBC career, he has also appeared on or hosted The Sunday Edition, Sounds Like Canada, The Inside Track, Go, All Points West, On the Coast and North by Northwest.

Phillips was born in North Vancouver, British Columbia, and grew up primarily in Penticton. Following the cancellation of Freestyle in 2007, Phillips ran for the New Democratic Party in the electoral district of Penticton in British Columbia's 2009 provincial election.

He subsequently launched Bettermen Solutions, a consulting firm which specializes in advocating for improved work–life balance programs in the workplace.

== Electoral record ==
B.C. General Election 2009 - Penticton
| Party | Candidate | Votes | % | ± | Expenditures |
|---|---|---|---|---|---|
| Liberal | Bill Barisoff | 10,346 | 43.96 | – | $97,580 |
| New Democratic | Cameron Phillips | 7,331 | 31.15 | – | $30,828 |
| Green | Julius Bloomfield | 3,685 | 15.66 | – | $37,129 |
| Conservative | Chris Delaney | 2,095 | 8.90 | – | $16,210 |
| Refederation | Wendy Dion | 78 | 0.33 | – | $730 |
| Total valid votes | | 23,535 | 100 | | |
| Total rejected ballots | | 114 | 0.48 | | |
| Turnout | | 23,649 | 56.16 | | |
