= Catherine Pogonat =

Canadian television host (born 1976)

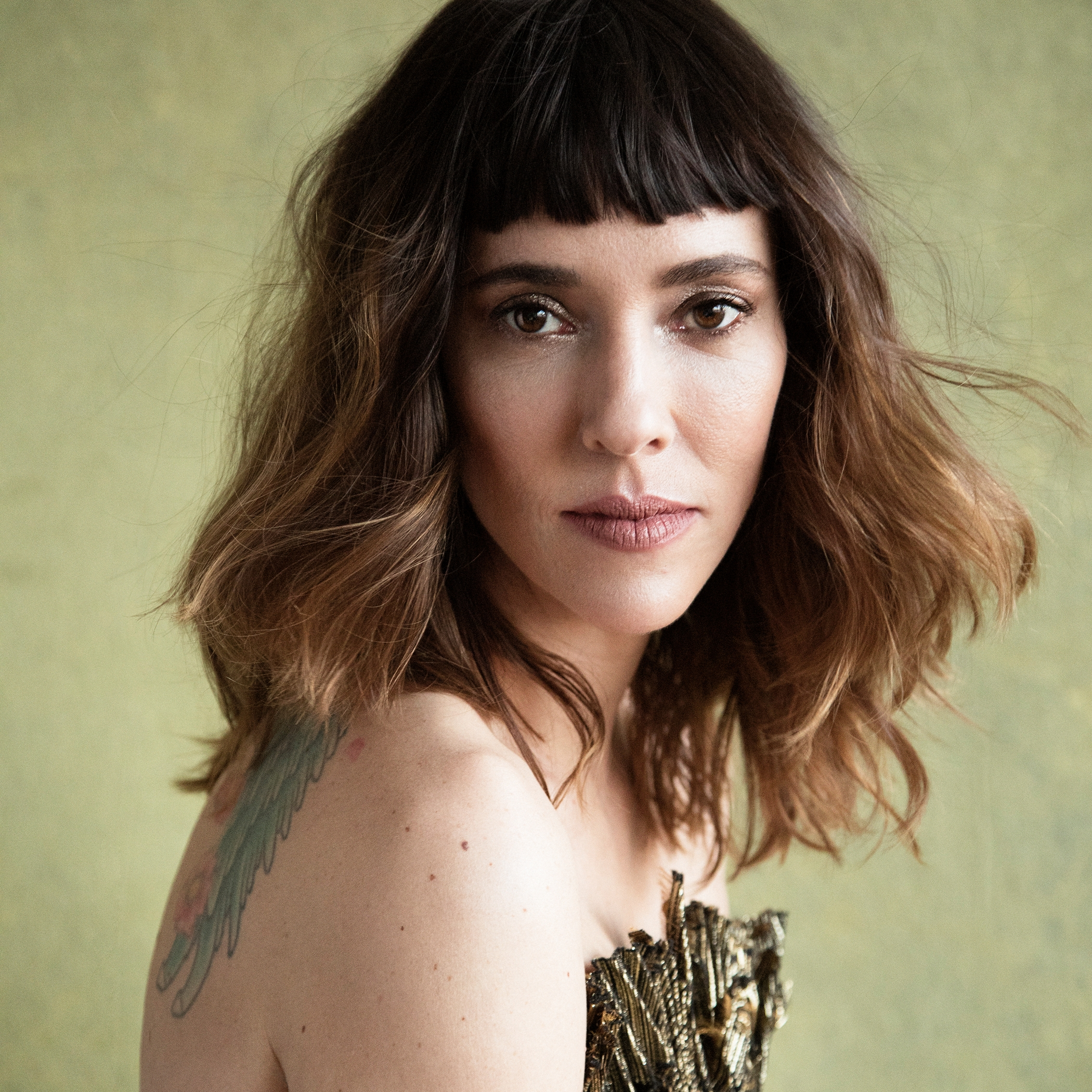
- Catherine Pogonat in 2018
- Born: September 2, 1976 (age 48); Moncton, New Brunswick

Catherine Pogonat (born September 2, 1976 in Moncton, New Brunswick) is a Canadian radio and television host from Montreal, known for her role in musical and cultural events in the province of Quebec.

== Career ==
Pogonat started at the Moncton University radio station CKUM-FM while studying Information-Communication at the Université de Moncton in Moncton, New Brunswick. She was noticed by the producers of Radio-Canada show Bande à part and was invited to host their show. During four years as a voice of Bande à part she introduced many new and not yet recognized artists to a wider audience. When Bande à part relocated to Montreal, she moved with the show back to her city.

On Radio-Canada television channel ARTV, she hosted Silence, on court!, a presentation of short films from around the world, and Mange ta ville, a show about unconventional artists and little known places of Montreal. On Radio-Canada's Espace musique network, she hosted a show about new francophone music every Friday night and now hosts a show L'effet Pogonat from Monday to Friday from 8 h 30 to 12 h. She hosted many live musical and cultural events in and around Montreal, among them Sacré talent! and Montréal en lumière.

== Personal life ==
Pogonat was born in Canada to a Romanian father and a Québécoise mother. She has a younger sister, Brigitte Pogonat, who is an actress.
