= 3 Guys on the Radio =

Three Guys on the Radio (TGOR)
- Genre: Sports talk
- Running time: 4 hours or so
- Country of origin: (Canada) CA
- Home station: CFGO
- Starring: Steve Warne, John Rodenburg, Matthew Hamer
- Original release: 1999 – Present

Three guys on the Radio is a sports radio talk show. It airs live for about four hours each weekday from 6:00 a.m. to 10:00 a.m. Eastern (or whenever the email segment gets done) on TSN 1200. In December 2009 their time slot shifted from 5:30 to 9:00 to its current time.

The show is produced in Ottawa, Ontario, and can be heard on the CFGO radio station in Ottawa (AM 1200), downloaded as a Podcast and streamed over the internet from the TSN 1200 website.

== History of the show ==
Three Guys on the Radio began as the morning drive show on the Team 1200 after the acquisition by CHUM Limited and rebranding of "Ottawa Sports Radio 1200" to "Sports Radio 1200 The Team".

The original cast of TGOR was Geoff Franklin, "Jungle" Jim Jerome, and John Rodenburg hosting, and shortly after, Steve Warne moved in to replace Rodenburg, who moved to the show "Sportscall." A short time later, Franklin was let go, and Rodenburg returned. Warne, self-proclaimed Mayor of Manotick, continues to be an anchor for the show. He is the local Valley boy who actually plays most of the games he talks about. He is happily married to his wife Linda Warne, who works for Rogers Communications at Y101 in Ottawa. He has an autistic son and inspires parents of autistic children with occasional tales of perseverance and humour. Throughout the year he produces the parody songs for the Ottawa Senators, often lampooning the Toronto Maple Leafs, including "Leafs Suck" (to the tune of Outkast's "Hey Ya") and "All the Leafs Stink" (to the tune of Blink 182's "All the Small Things"). He has introduced several segments including the Dirty Dozen, 61 second shootout, Annoying Yet Catchy Song of the Day, Blue Team (Maple Leaf Playoff) Elimination Watch and many others. He also co-hosts a fitness, wealth management, closet organization and sex advice show called Grecosize that runs from 9:00 AM to 10:00 AM on Saturday mornings with self-proclaimed guru, Tony Greco. He debuted in the show in 2000 and has the most appearances.

Jim Jerome returned to Edmonton, and did TGOR out of his basement from December 13, 2005, to August 2006. He left join the morning show at K-Rock CIRK-FM, Jerome's mother Barry Jerome (1931-2012), widow of former House of Commons Speaker James Jerome, appeared on Fridays to give her NFL picks of the week. Jim Jerome's claim to fame is a Gretzky sidekick from the 1980s and his unorthodox takes on the game of hockey, his ability to change any subject to golf, and his tongue in cheek references to women and sexual issues. He returned after Tim's death, from his house in Edmonton. He is often the butt of jokes, including his terrible attendance record and daffy takes. Under different ownership, his edge was sharper with more creative freedom in early hours of the show. With the ownership change from CHUM Limited to corporatist Bell Media, the show reduced the edgy sexual humour content. On Thursday, February 9, 2012, due to CTVGlobeMedia restructuring; Jim Jerome's hosting job was terminated. Jerome was quoted on the show as saying "it would be tough, but he'd be alright".

John Rodenburg recently returned to the show from 93.9 Bob FM in a trade that sent Stu Schwartz to 93.9 Bob FM in September 2009, Rodenburg's third time with the show. John self-proclaimed "Man of the People", is a stalwart Philadelphia Eagles fan and Calgary Flames fan and regular host who has three daughters.

On Friday, July 25, 2008, former host Tim Kilpatrick died. CFRA reported that Kilpatrick entered the hospital July 16, 2008 with shortness of breath, which doctors determined was caused by a lung infection. He died shortly after 10 a.m. Friday morning. Kilpatrick also hosted "The Buzz on Junior Hockey" for the radio station. In a classy move, TSN 1200 retains its junior hockey pre-game show moniker in his honour.

During the NHL Lockout, they invoke a no-lockout-talk guarantee from 7–8.

On September 30, 2014, the station was re-branded as TSN 1200, but the TGOR show itself changed very little.

On March 13, 2019, Steve Warne tweeted "Today was my final show on @TSN1200. Thanks to Bell Media for a great run. I had a blast and I'll miss it. Excited now to head into free agency and seeing what the next chapter brings. #Another2019UFA".

== Notable Segments of the show ==
- The 61-second Shootout around 7:40am a contestant battles the clock, while answering rapid-fire questions, in order to win prizes. If they are unsuccessful, they must take the "Oath of Incompetence". In the "Oath", they must reveal their last name or place of employment, then admit to stinking like old cheese (or similar) and admit they are not a man.
- The NHL with Pierre McGuire with NBC Sports colour commentator Pierre McGuire
- TSN 1200 Sportscentre Updates that run every twenty minutes, traffic updates provided usually by John and business report with Jon Brenner
