= The Performers (TV program) =

- Genre: Variety show
- Presented by: Gordie Tapp
- Country of origin: Canada
- Original language: English
- No. of seasons: 1
- No. of episodes: 18

Production
- Executive producer: Len Starmer
- Producer: Ray McConnell

Original release
- Network: CBC Television
- Release: 22 May – 2 October 1971

The Performers is a Canadian variety show that aired on CBC Television from 1971 to 1972.

== Premise ==
Episodes were geared towards introducing young and little-known performers. The program was recorded before audiences in various Canadian cities (Edmonton, Halifax, Montreal, Ottawa, Toronto, Vancouver, Winnipeg).

== Scheduling ==
This half-hour program was broadcast on Saturdays at 10:00 p.m. from 22 May to 2 October 1971. Due to a technicians' strike in 1972, CBC rebroadcast the program in the same time slot from 22 April to 1 July 1972 then aired episodes on Fridays at 8:00 p.m. from 7 July to 25 August 1972.
