= The Mystery Project =

1992–2002 Canadian radio program

The Mystery Project was produced by CBC Radio (Canada). It aired every Saturday night on CBC Radio One (6:30 p.m. for most of Canada, 7:30 p.m. Maritimes, 8:00 p.m. Nfld.), and was repeated at 3:30 p.m. the following Mondays on The Roundup, also on Radio One.

The series ran from 1992 until 2002. Each week, casual listeners got to puzzle through a fully dramatized radio-play with a resolved plot, while regular listeners had the added fun of following familiar characters' further adventures. The series was created by the Executive Producer, Bill Howell. Barry Morgan was the co-ordinating producer. With Host Bob Boving.

== Series ==
Among the many series featured were:

- In The Blood by Paul Ledoux
  (8 eps)
- Midnight Cab by James W. Nichol
  (39 eps)
- Death Downtown by Paul Milliken
  (3 eps)
- Flynn by Lyal and Barbara Brown
  (13 eps)
- Pocket City Blues by Charles Tidler
  (4 eps)
- House Detective Becker by Martin Kinch
  (13 eps in 12 plays, the last of which was in two parts)
- Albert's Father by Henry Comor
  (5 eps)
- Clean Sweep by Alf Silver
  (30 eps)
- Bailey's Way by Gordon Pengilly
  (13 eps)
- Recipe for Murder by Don Druick
  (8 eps)
- The Old Guy by Paul Ledoux
- Fallaway Ridge by Eve Crawford and Cathy Dunphy
  (4 eps)
- The Investigations of Quentin Nickles by John Richard Wright
  (20 eps)(the last 3 eps never broadcast)
- Peggy Delaney by James W. Nichol
  (39 eps)
