= Search Engine (radio show) =

Presentation
- Hosted by: Jesse Brown
- Genre: Technology
- Format: Podcast

Search Engine was a weekly Canadian radio show that aired on CBC Radio One, then as a dedicated podcast distributed by the CBC and finally by TVOntario. It was hosted by Jesse Brown, who also co-produced the show with Geoff Siskind and Andrew Parker. Cory Doctorow, novelist and editor of Boing Boing, was also a regular contributor. The program explored the effects of the Internet on politics and culture. The show has focused on stories involving copyright, video games, and China, as well as the social impact and technology surrounding them.

== Overview ==
Search Engine first aired on September 6, 2007. It discussed Internet phenomena. Unlike other shows, however, Search Engine concentrates on ways in which the Internet influences other aspects of life and culture. Though much of the subject matter he deals with is serious, Brown generally takes a lighthearted, tongue-in-cheek approach to his material.

Originally every episode began with a set of keywords - teaser phrases that summarize the major stories for that episode. The term "keyword" ties into the name of the show as something a search engine uses to categorize things of importance. Other Internet terms were regularly invoked and adapted to the purpose of attempting to describe unusual or unprecedented technology-related cultural phenomena.

The program ran for one half-hour. Usually there were three in-depth stories, each of which was separated by a clip of Creative Commons licensed music. Other, smaller topics were occasionally interspersed. Often these consisted of updates on past stories, or addresses to the listeners about the show itself.

In keeping with an open source theme, the creators of Search Engine utilized the show's online blog to communicate and collaborate with listeners. The radio stories feed off of opinions or information gleaned from listener commentary. Follow-up pieces are at times justified by direct listener response. Additionally, listeners are often openly encouraged on the air to contribute to the betterment of specific aspects of the show.

The show had several occasional features that were periodically played:

- The Best of Craigslist: Craigslist CEO Jim Buckmaster reading selected outlandish posts from his company's site.
- Copyfight: Digital rights columnist Cory Doctorow commentary on controversies springing from issues with Internet copyright law.
- Flipback: A segment that showcases recordings resurrected from the Internet Archive.
- Another recurring topic investigated on Search Engine is the Internet Bill of Rights, a set of universal standards concerning online liberties drafted and spearheaded by the Internet Governance Forum.

Original Search Engine Logo

This logo, created by Nick Csernack, was used by Search Engine

== Program History ==
The program aired on Thursdays at 11:30 a.m.(12:00 NT), and was repeated on Tuesdays at 3:30 p.m.(4:00 NT, select markets) on stations which did not air extended CBC Radio One local programs.

In June 2008, the series was canceled as a separate program on the schedule. In the 2008-2009 season, Brown contributed Search Engine type material as a feature supplement to other CBC programming while producing a weekly stand alone audio podcast of the series along with its blog.

Shortly after the announcement some fans of the show created a Facebook Group, “Saving CBC's Search Engine” to protest the cancellation of the radio show and reformatting of the podcast. After only a few weeks this group had well over 700 members.

The Brown and the podcast's association with the CBC was terminated in the face of the corporation's budget cuts in the spring of 2009. As such, Jesse Brown announced on May 1, 2009 that his podcast would be hosted and supported by the Government of Ontario's public broadcasting network, TVOntario.

The show ran for many years on TVOntario as a download only podcast. The final episode was on June 26, 2012.

== Subjects of Focus ==
=== Canadian Copyright ===
As well as in regular contributions from Cory Doctorow, Brown focused on the issues surrounding Canadian copyright. Originally mentioning it on one show, he soon realized that many listeners were interested in the issue. He discussed Bill C-60, which would supposedly bring down more draconian laws than the DMCA did in the United States. He has also spoken about the lack of a Fair Use law in Canada and controversy surrounding the issue.

=== China ===
Since its inception, Search Engine has broadcast stories pertaining to government control of the Internet in China, commented on the citizen journalism efforts in that nation, and criticized the Chinese government for the ways in which its policies restrict access to many Internet venues.

In early 2008, it was reported by a number of Search Engine listeners in China that the CBC had been rendered unavailable. The show's crew kept in contact with these listeners through message boards and its Facebook page, and confirmed that the blockage was limited to China and was therefore not a technical problem. Brown broke the story on the air, which prompted the president of the CBC to make an appeal to the Chinese Ambassador, calling for an end to the blockage. Soon after, the site was made available again in China.

=== The Internet and Identity ===
In January 2008, Search Engine began reporting on the controversy between the Internet group "Anonymous" and the Church of Scientology. Brown called Anonymous "clowns," and invited them to call his bluff. He later had two members of the group on the show. After Anonymous held a protest in front of Scientology compounds around the world on February 10, 2008, Brown admitted that they had "proved me wrong."

The nature of the protest was unprecedented - picketers wore masks and refused to divulge names - and sparked a discussion on the show about the meaning of identity. Brown brought the issue to his own workplace, interviewing CBC's president Hubert Lacroix in reaction to a conflict between him and an anonymous critic who went by the handle "Ouimet."

== Producers / Contributors ==
Jesse Brown is the host and one of the producers of Search Engine. He has worked in multiple forms of media, including print, television, and radio. He has primarily categorized himself as a humorist. Brown's first formal recognition as a producer of media came at the age of 18, when he received the Udo award from Ryerson University School of Journalism in Toronto, Ontario, Canada for starting a successful underground student newspaper at the school. He has since written for The Globe and Mail, the National Post and Vice.

In 2003, Brown launched a magazine called Stu under the pseudonym Stuart Neihardt. The magazine was billed as a reaction to the banality of "lad" magazines like Maxim and FHM; something geared toward the "regular guy" (which Neihardt claimed to be).

During 2003 and 2004, Brown wrote a humor column called "The Experiment" for Saturday Night. Several of his articles won Honorable Mentions in the National Magazine Awards during those years."Stu Magazine" won the Silver spot in 2003.

In the summer of 2006, Brown hosted another CBC Radio show called The Contrarians that investigated the potential virtues of unpopular ideas.

Brown is currently listed as part of the editorial staff on the website FordPoweredByYou.ca, a site created by Ford of Canada for bloggers to post their thoughts on the ways in which the automotive realm intersects with technology, the environment, and everyday life. However, Brown says that he "was going to contribute, but we didn't see eye to eye on editorial stuff and I've never contributed anything to the site." He adds that he's been trying to get them to take his face off the site ever since.

Geoff Siskind is one of the producers of Search Engine. He has produced a number of documentaries - some of which have aired on various programs on the CBC. His work has been featured on Outfront, Sounds Like Canada, The Omnivore, and CBC Radio 3.

Andrew Parker is one of the producers of Search Engine. He has worked as an editor and producer for the CBC since 1998. He has also freelanced for Deutsche Welle radio while living in Düsseldorf, Germany.

On May 7, 2008, Hannah Classen joined the team at Search Engine as the show's blog poster/moderator.

The audience also contributes to the makeup of the show. Collaborative efforts have been used in the past to rewrite the show's sign-off for grammar concerns and to redesign its logo. Story pitches are accepted through Search Engine's website.

Search Engine's theme song is called "Ethiopia Hagere." It was written and performed in a collaborative effort between Ethiopian saxophonist Getatchew Mekurya and punk band The Ex. It first appeared on the 2007 album Moa Anbessa.

== Awards ==
Search Engine was listed in iTunes "Best of 2007" podcast list, under both Canadian and U.S. categories.

The show has been nominated for two awards by the New York Festival Radio Awards. The finalist entries are Brown's essay on Zeitgeist, the Movie nominated in the editorial/viewpoint category and documentary on Shannen Rossmiller, the housewife turned online terrorist hunter nominated in the community/portrait category.
