= Tetsuro Shigematsu =

Canadian comedian (born 1971)

- Born: February 26, 1971 (age 55); London, England
- Occupations: Radio broadcaster, comedian, filmmaker, writer
- Years active: 1993–present
- Known for: Comedy, vlogging
- Relatives: 2 children and wife
- Website: shiggy.com

Tetsuro Shigematsu (born 1971) is a Canadian playwright/performer, filmmaker, comedian, and radio broadcaster. He was the final host of CBC Radio One's former afternoon series The Roundup, where he replaced Bill Richardson in 2004, making him the first visible minority to host a daily network radio program in Canada. The show completed its final episode on November 4, 2005. Prior to working for CBC Radio, he was a writer for the Canadian TV show This Hour Has 22 Minutes. He is currently a writer for The Huffington Post, and artist-in-residence at Vancouver Asian Canadian Theatre.

== Early life ==
Shigematsu was born in London, England in 1971. His father was from Kagoshima, Japan, and his mother was from Osaka, Japan. His family emigrated to Canada in 1974. He grew up in Surrey, British Columbia, with four siblings, and studied in Montreal. He has a BFA from Concordia University.

In 1991, at the age of 19, Shigematsu became the youngest playwright to compete in the history of the Quebec Drama Festival.

== Career ==
From 1993 to 1996, Shigematsu wrote and performed his one-man show Rising Son in Montreal, Boston, Los Angeles, and Tokyo. In 1994, Tetsuro studied poetry with Allen Ginsberg. He then spent the following two years in Japan, where he studied Butoh dance with the founding master, Kazu Ohno, in Yokohama, Japan.

In 1996, he starred with George Takei (Star Trek's Sulu) in the television movie Rinko The Best Bad Thing, based on the novel by Yoshiko Uchida. That same year, Tetsuro began hosting the Montreal Asian Heritage Festival.

In 1997, he created and produced three episodes of La La Pan-Asia, a half-hour TV show showcasing Asian youth culture. In 1998, he was awarded a Canada Council grant to write a new play, The Moons of Tokyo. In 1999, Shigematsu was invited to be artist-in-residence at Technoboro, an artist-run media lab.

His video work has been seen in the Montreal World Film Festival and the Biosphere and won the Prix du Public at the Evénement Interuniversitaire d'Art.

In 2007, Shigematsu completed his feature film debut, Yellow Fellas, which he wrote and directed.

In 2009, Shigematsu appeared in Episode 2 of the TV series Deadliest Warrior as one of the experts for the Samurai team. In 2010, he returned for the Deadliest Warrior "Back for Blood" special, a transition from season one to season two pitting the winning warriors from season one against one another.

In 2011, Shigematsu gave a TEDx talk called The Awesomeness of Your Contradictions.

In 2011, Shigematsu began his PhD within the Faculty of Education at the University of British Columbia. He conducts research on social media, with a focus on the rising visibility of diasporic Asians on YouTube, for which he was named a Vanier scholar.

In 2012, Shigematsu began writing for The Huffington Post.

In 2015, Shigematsu's theatrical solo work Empire of the Son had its world premiere at The Cultch in Vancouver. The entire run sold out prior to opening. The Vancouver Sun named it as the best theatre show of 2015. The 2016 remount also sold out its run prior to opening.

In October 2017, Shigematsu's next solo work, 1 Hour Photo, had its world premiere at The Cultch in Vancouver. 1 Hour Photo was shortlisted for the Governor General's Award for English-language drama at the 2019 Governor General's Awards.

== Personal life ==
Shigematsu speaks English, French, Japanese, and Persian. He has two children.
