= Jurgen Gothe =

Canadian radio broadcaster

- Born: April 4, 1944; Berlin, Germany
- Died: April 9, 2015 (aged 71); Vancouver, British Columbia, Canada

Jurgen Gothe (April 4, 1944 – April 9, 2015) was a German-born Canadian radio broadcaster and print columnist. For 23 years, from 1985 to 2008, he was host of the national classical music program DiscDrive, which aired across Canada on CBC Radio 2.

== Life and career ==
Gothe was born in Berlin, Germany, where he was a child actor for Rundfunk im amerikanischen Sektor before his family moved to Canada in 1954. They settled in Medicine Hat, Alberta, where his father was a baker. He dropped out of high school after Grade 10, and joined local radio station CHAT at age 15 as an advertising copywriter, later moving to an on-air role as host of a jazz show and writing for sister CBC television affiliate station CHAT-TV.

Moving to Vancouver, British Columbia in the mid-1960s, he worked for an advertising agency and for CHQM-FM before rejoining the CBC, this time in radio. He briefly hosted a weekend classical music program in 1984 before becoming host of DiscDrive in 1985.

After DiscDrive was cancelled in 2008 as part of a format shift at Radio 2, Gothe continued with the CBC for one more year as host of the weekend classical music program Farrago until leaving the CBC in 2009.

Throughout his radio career, Gothe was also a contributor of wine and food writing to various publications, a judge at wine and culinary competitions both in Canada and internationally, and ran his own corporate public relations company, Quincy Gothe. Quincy, his nominal partner in the firm, was his pet cat. He wrote the "Uncorked" wine column for The Georgia Straight from 1997 to 2014. He announced his retirement as a columnist for The Georgia Straight in August 2014.

== Personal life ==
He was married to photographer Kate Williams and they had one daughter Colette. They lived on Mayne Island until his deteriorating health forced him to enter a special care facility in Vancouver. Gothe was known as a bon vivant. When she announced his death on April 10, his wife noted that he died during happy hour.
