= Share the Wealth (radio program) =

Canadian radio game show

Share the Wealth was a Canadian Broadcasting Corporation radio game show which aired during World War II. In early broadcasts, the master of ceremonies was Bert Pearl and the announcer was Hugh Bartlett, both from The Happy Gang. Cy Mack and Stan Francis later took over.
