= Backstage with Ben Heppner =

Backstage with Ben Heppner was a Canadian radio program. Airing on Saturday afternoons, on Sunday mornings on CBC Music and repeated on the same Sunday evening on CBC Radio One, the program is hosted by Ben Heppner and presents primarily classical music from Canadian and international artists. Playing both orchestral and operatic pieces, Heppner also shares personal anecdotes from his own career as an opera tenor. The farewell show was broadcast on Labour Day weekend, 2021.
