= The Point (radio show) =

- Country of origin: Canada
- Language(s): English
- Home station: CBC Radio One
- Hosted by: Aamer Haleem
- Original release: 29 September 2008 – 26 June 2009
- No. of series: 1
- Website: cbc.ca/thepoint

The Point was a Canadian radio program, which aired weekday afternoons on CBC Radio One. Hosted by Aamer Haleem, the program presented a mix of current affairs and lifestyle interviews and panel discussions.

Each day's episode also featured two guest "Point People", who participated with Haleem in further discussion on the topics raised by the program's main segments. Point People featured on the show have included journalists Jacqueline Hennessy, Fiona Forbes, Michael Hlinka, Sharon McLeod, Simi Sara and Victor Dwyer, political strategist Tasha Kheiriddin, writers Kevin Patterson and Heather Mallick, and Sarnia mayor Mike Bradley.

The Point was cancelled by the CBC after one season as part of cost-cutting measures. Its final show aired on 26 June 2009.
