= Studio Sparks =

Studio Sparks was a Canadian radio program, which aired weekday afternoons from 12:00 PM to 3:00 PM on CBC Radio 2. Hosted by Eric Friesen, the program aired concert performances by classical, jazz and world music performers, as well as interview segments with the performers.

It was broadcast from the CBC's studios overlooking the Sparks Street Mall in Ottawa, Ontario, which gave the program its name.

The program has been discontinued since September 2008.
