= CBC Wednesday Night =

Radio program

CBC Wednesday Night was a weekly anthology series which aired on CBC Radio from 1947 until the 1970s. The program featured a mix of music, plays, operas, documentaries, and news, and typically ran for around three hours without commercials. It was billed as being "produced primarily for the discriminating listener", and drew comparisons to the BBC Third Programme. The series was critically acclaimed, receiving awards from the Ohio State University Institute for Education by radio "for its courageous experiments with radio themes, techniques and writing, and for the excellence of its music and production." Because of its reputation for high-brow entertainment, it also attracted some controversy to the CBC, which was sometimes criticized for the "arrogance" of its cultural programming.

It was created under the supervision of Harry Boyle. The show's time slot later moved and it was rebranded Sunday Night, and finally Tuesday Night, before ending in 1976.
