= Q (radio show) =

Canadian radio show

q with Tom Power
- Running time: 90 minutes
- Country of origin: Canada
- Home station: CBC Radio One
- Syndicates: Public Radio Exchange (US)
- Hosted by: Jian Ghomeshi (2007–2014); Shad (2015–2016); Tom Power (2016–present)
- Recording studio: Canadian Broadcasting Centre, Toronto
- Original release: April 16, 2007
- Website: www.cbc.ca/radio/q
- Podcast: www.cbc.ca/radio/podcasts/arts-culture/q-the-podcast/

q with Tom Power (previously known as Q with Jian Ghomeshi) is a Canadian arts magazine show produced by and airing on CBC Radio One, with syndication to public radio stations in the United States through Public Radio Exchange. The program mainly features interviews with prominent cultural and entertainment figures, though subjects and interviewees also deal with broader cultural topics such as their social, political and business aspects.

Though not the highest-rated show on CBC Radio One (The Current and As It Happens hold that distinction), Q is the highest rated show in its timeslot in CBC history, surpassing even Peter Gzowski who previously hosted the second hour of Morningside during the slot. The show is also regarded as standing out in CBC Radio One's schedule through attracting a younger, more social-media-adept audience than other CBC Radio programming.

Q was launched in April 2007. It was hosted by Jian Ghomeshi until October 2014.

Shad was chosen by the CBC in March 2015 as Q's new permanent host. His official debut as host was April 20. The show was also re-branded as q at the same time.

In August 2016, the CBC announced that Shad would be replaced as host by Tom Power, formerly the host of Radio 2 Morning, in the fall. Power debuted as host on October 24, 2016.

From late March to May 15, 2020, due to the COVID-19 pandemic in Canada, the 10 a.m. broadcast of the program was suspended in favour of an extended broadcast of the network's morning news program The Current; however, Power was heard on The Current as a contributor of arts stories during this period. New episodes of the program still aired in the evening repeat slot, and the program was temporarily added to the schedule of CBC Music, replacing that network's 7-8 p.m. hour of regular programming.

In November 2022 the CBC announced a change to the program's format. Beginning January 30, 2023, the program's length would be reduced from 90 minutes to one hour, and would concentrate more strongly on Power's long-form interviews, while the magazine aspects of the show, such as TV/film and music panel discussions, would be transferred to the new 30-minute show Commotion, to be hosted by Elamin Abdelmahmoud.

Produced for most of its history at the Canadian Broadcasting Centre in Toronto, as of fall 2026 the show is produced principally at the CBC's studios in Power's hometown of St. John's.

== Episodes ==
The program airs live Monday to Friday at 10:00 a.m. (10:30 NT) for 90 minutes, and an abbreviated 60-minute edition is then repeated at 9 p.m. Due to lesser time restraints (such as less time lost to news breaks) the evening repeat is able to air all of the feature content from the 90-minute daytime edition, although some shorter interstitial segments may be edited out. Stations carrying the show in the United States also broadcast the one-hour edition.

It is broadcast mostly from CBC's Toronto studios, although the show also sometimes airs special broadcasts from other Canadian cities.

On Fridays, the show formerly aired for two hours, and included a theme called "Friday Live", where featured musicians are invited for an interview primarily as the opening segment with live performances throughout the program.

== History ==
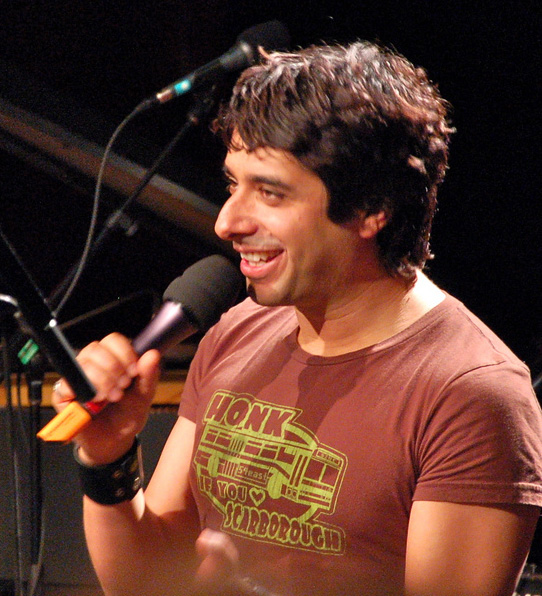
Former host Jian Ghomeshi in March 2009, during a live taping of Q

Q first aired on April 16, 2007, replacing Freestyle in the network's afternoon programming block. It moved to its current time slot, replacing Sounds Like Canada, in fall 2008.

The name was chosen by the staff of the show from a list they themselves had compiled. A test run of the show was made using the name Radar. Other possible names (some clearly tongue-in-cheek) included "State-of the-Arts in Canada", "Awesometown", "Afternoon Delight", "Smells like Canada", "Full Duplex Repeater", "Skybox Three" (the room in Toronto's Rogers Centre where much of the show was created), "Ghomer's Pile", or one even closer to Jian Ghomeshi, the show host of Iranian descent, "Royal Canadian Air Farsi". Names a little closer to the mark included Studio Q and The Cue. According to Ghomeshi, "A couple of the ... suggestions came close", when the name 'Q' was brought up "there was a pause in the room and [the Q team] went 'Yes, that's it.' It felt like the right name. It's an enigmatic letter [they] hope will become associated with the show."

Beginning in 2013, a one-hour weekly spinoff series, Q The Music, was added to the CBC Music schedule, airing a selection of interviews and performances by musicians previously broadcast on the daily program. On April 15, 2015, the show changed its name to the lower case q.

=== 2009 Thornton interview ===
On April 8, 2009, Billy Bob Thornton and his musical group The Boxmasters made an appearance on Q that was widely criticized and received international attention after Thornton was persistently unintelligible and discourteous to Ghomeshi. Thornton eventually explained he had "instructed" the show's producers to not ask questions about his movie career. Ghomeshi had mentioned Thornton's acting in the introduction. Thornton had also complained Canadian audiences were like "mashed potatoes without the gravy". The following night, opening for Willie Nelson at Toronto's Massey Hall, Thornton said mid-set he liked Canadians but not Ghomeshi, which was greeted with boos and catcalls. The Boxmasters did not continue the tour in Canada as, according to Thornton, some of the crew and band had the flu.

Ghomeshi and comedian Alan Park made a mock follow-up interview promoting the 2009 Air Farce Live television special. The sketch has Ghomeshi asking Thornton (Alan Park) about his plans for New Years, leading to the actor responding similar answers to the April interview. The two continue to banter until they break character and laugh around.

=== Ghomeshi's dismissal ===
Ghomeshi was fired from the CBC in October 2014, amidst a mounting series of allegations that he had sexually assaulted a series of women, including former Q producer Kathryn Borel.

After his departure, the program was hosted by a rotating series of guest hosts, including existing CBC staffers such as Brent Bambury, Piya Chattopadhyay, Tom Power, Allan Hawco and Talia Schlanger, and outside figures such as Wab Kinew, Rachel Giese, Damian Abraham, Candy Palmater, Shad, Daniel Richler, and Sean Rameswaram. Many of the guest hosts were effectively auditioning for a place on the shortlist of potential new permanent hosts.

During the transition process, the CBC faced controversy when it announced that it intended to remove all Ghomeshi-hosted segments of the program from its online archive of previously-broadcast content. They ultimately reversed this decision in the face of public disapproval, allowing the content to remain accessible online for the standard two-year period applicable to all other CBC content, but reaffirming that no content hosted by Ghomeshi will be re-aired on terrestrial radio.

Late in the guest-hosting phase, Measha Brueggergosman and Kevin Smith each hosted a single show as part of a "Thursday surprise" feature, in which the show would be turned over for one day to a guest host whose identity had not been announced in advance.

=== Shad era ===
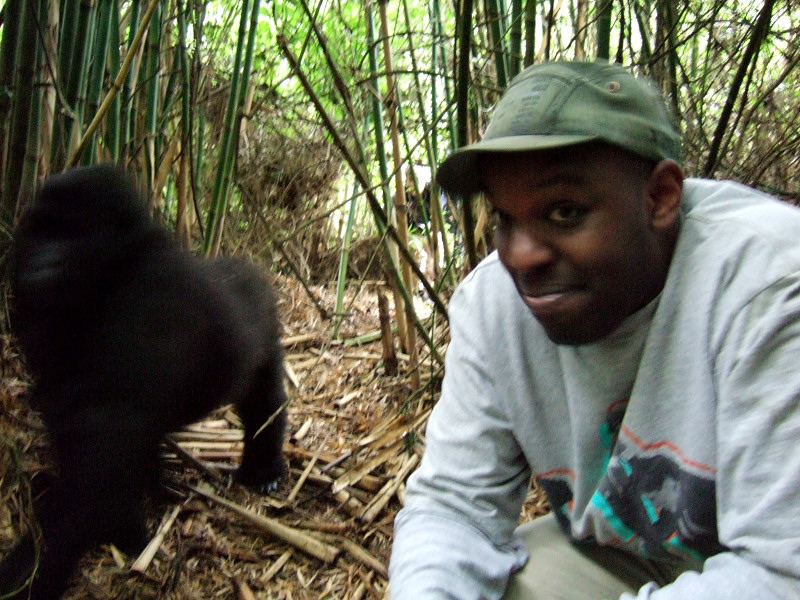
Shad photographed with a gorilla while on a visit to Rwanda, 2006

The "final five" shortlist of host candidates comprised Shad, Palmater, Richler, Rameswaram and Power. Shad's selection was announced on March 10, 2015. His debut as host was on April 20, with a live broadcast from the CBC's Glenn Gould Studio. Producers indicated that under Shad, the program would increase its focus on music and would adopt a looser, less structured format. Concurrently with Shad's debut as host, the program also unveiled new theme music composed by Canadian musician Bahamas.

=== Tom Power era ===
Shad was replaced with Tom Power in August 2016, as the program's ratings had declined significantly over the period when he hosted. Palmater returned as guest host of the show for the weeks between Shad's departure and Power's debut. Concurrently with Power taking over the host's chair, the show also debuted another new theme song, composed and performed by Ewan and Shamus Currie of The Sheepdogs through their side project BROS. Other regular contributors to the show included CBC Music's Raina Douris and Odario Williams, who appeared as part of a weekly segment devoted to new album releases, and Jael Richardson as a book reviewer.

== Television versions ==
External videos
- Joni Mitchell on Q - Part 1, 32:43, June 11, 2013, q on CBC
- Wayne Gretzky's '99 Stories of the Game', 24:47, October 17, 2016, q on CBC

Filmed footage of interviews and live musical performances from the radio program airs on CBC Television and YouTube.

The show was syndicated from September 2014 until September 2016 for weekend airings to commercial television stations in the United States through PPI (the former Program Partners), a major syndicator of Canadian programming into the American television market. Due to Ghomeshi's dismissal from the CBC mere weeks after its premiere, the PPI version of the show had its format shifted abruptly to feature a 'best-of' compilation of the week's interviews and musical performances (similar to some sports radio show television simulcasts) with the show's interim hosts instead with Ghomeshi's segments completely removed, rather than the intended format of replays of archival content with Ghomeshi throughout several years. The show was effectively relaunched in early May 2015 with Shad taking a greater role in the PPI version of the series.
