= Inside the Music =

Inside the Music is a Canadian radio program, which began airing on CBC Radio One and CBC Radio 2 in 2007. Hosted by Patti Schmidt, the program airs documentaries about musicians, frequently but not exclusively Canadians.

It covers the inspiration for music, the motivations of performers, and outside events that influence a composer's work.

Musicians profiled on the series have included Joni Mitchell, Oscar Peterson, Lenny Breau, Emanuel Ax, Pinchas Zukerman, Ian Tyson, Jackie Shane, Jim Cuddy, Leonard Cohen and The Byrds.

== My Playlist ==
My Playlist, a CBC Radio series in which a guest host is invited to play some of their own favourite songs, began as a recurring feature on Inside the Music. It now airs as a separate weekly program, although it is still produced by the same team as Inside the Music.
