= Variety Tonight =

Canadian radio show

Variety Tonight was a CBC Radio show which aired from 1980 until 1985 in the 8–10 p.m. timeslot. It was a nightly series featuring jazz and pop music as well as trivia games, book and movie reviews, comedy segments and interviews.

The program was created by producer Danny Finkleman, but he was let go from the program in December 1980. It was hosted by David Cole in its first season, followed by Vicki Gabereau for the remainder of its run. Cole continued to contribute to the program in 1982 and 1983 as producer of Here Come the Seventies, a sketch comedy series that aired as a weekly half-hour segment of Variety Tonight. Variety Tonight also aired the initial series of the sketch comedy show Frantic Times in 1981, which went on to become a standalone CBC Radio series.

In the show's first season, it hired Don Novello, in character as Father Guido Sarducci, to serve as a correspondent covering the 1980 United States presidential election.

Gabereau won an ACTRA Award for Best Radio Host or Interviewer at the 13th ACTRA Awards in 1984. She was also nominated, but did not win, at the 12th ACTRA Awards in 1983, and at the 14th ACTRA Awards in 1985.

After the program's cancellation, Gabereau continued in the same time slot as host of the new interview series Gabereau in the 1985-86 season. In January 1986 she announced that she would be leaving the show at the end of the season to pursue other interests; she was ultimately convinced to change her mind and remain with the network, although her show moved to a weekly airing on Saturdays and its nightly time slot was taken over by Stan Carew's new Prime Time.
