= Saturday Afternoon at the Opera =

CBC Music radio program

Saturday Afternoon at the Opera is a Canadian radio programme, which airs Saturday afternoons on CBC Music. The programme airs live and pre-recorded opera concert performances, as well as interviews with opera artists and reviews of opera CDs.

SATO includes the Metropolitan Opera radio broadcasts during its season, from late November or early December to late April or early May each year. As contractually required, these broadcasts are aired in their entirety, including sponsorships, representing one of only two forms of advertising currently permitted on CBC Radio. This is despite the fact that the current sponsor of the Metropolitan Opera broadcasts, Toll Brothers, does not have any Canadian operations.

From 1985 until 2007, whenever SATO was not retransmitting a Metropolitan Opera radio broadcast, most programs (intermissions permitting) included an opera quiz hosted by Stuart Hamilton, in much the same format as the quiz that is part of the Met broadcasts.

While Saturday Afternoon at the Opera originated in 1982, CBC Radio has been carrying the Metropolitan Opera radio broadcasts since the Canadian Broadcasting Corporation's creation in 1936, as did its predecessor, the Canadian Radio Broadcasting Commission, which began airing the program in December 1933. The Metropolitan Opera broadcasts were simulcast on both the main CBC Radio network (known today as CBC Radio One) and what was originally the FM network (known for many years as CBC Stereo, then CBC Radio Two, now CBC Music) from the beginning of the FM network in 1946 until 1985. The Metropolitan Opera broadcasts are also aired on the CBC's French network on the programme Place à l'Opéra.

The program was hosted for two decades by Howard Dyck from 1987-2007. Bill Richardson hosted the programme from 2007 until 2013. Ben Heppner subsequently hosted the programme from 2013 to 2021. Since 2021, the programme host has been First Nations mezzo-soprano Marion Newman.

CBC Radio One's pop culture newsmagazine Definitely Not the Opera, which aired from 1994 until 2016, took its name from the fact that it aired at the same time as SATO.
