= Marvin's Room (radio show) =

CBC radio program

- Genre: rhythm and blues
- Country of origin: Canada
- Language: English
- Home station: CBC Music
- Starring: Jemeni
- Original release: July 2016 – present

Marvin's Room is a Canadian radio program, which airs on CBC Music. Created and originally hosted by Amanda Parris, the program explores the genre of rhythm and blues, incorporating both historical and contemporary music in the genre.

The program premiered in July 2016 as a short-run summer series hosted by Parris. Following the end of the show's original run, the CBC announced that the series would return as a permanent part of the network's regular schedule, beginning in November 2016.

The title was chosen because it symbolically connects the history and the future of the genre, linking Marvin Gaye's historic recording studio Marvin's Room with the contemporary Drake song "Marvins Room".

The series is also repeated on CBC Radio One in a weekend slot.

In November 2020, it was announced that the host, Amanda Parris, would leave the show temporarily on maternity leave. Music journalist and critic A. Harmony was named interim host in her absence.

In September 2022, Amanda Parris announced that she would be stepping down as host of Marvin's Room and that A. Harmony, previously interim host, would become the new permanent host. A. Harmony's first episode as permanent host originally aired on September 16, 2022. Jemeni, a longtime broadcaster on Toronto urban radio stations Flow 93.5 and G98.7 and later Indigenous-based station Elmnt FM, later became host succeeding Harmony.
