= Canada Live =

Canadian radio program

Canada Live is a Canadian radio program aired on both CBC Radio One and CBC Radio 2 since 2007. It debuted on March 19, 2007, on CBC Radio 2, and airs concert performances in a variety of musical genres from locations across Canada.

The program was originally hosted by Matt Galloway on weekdays and Patti Schmidt on weekends. However, their main role on most occasions was to introduce a local CBC personality in the region from which the concert was broadcast, who then hosted the remainder of the evening. From fall 2007 to fall 2009, the program only used the regional hosts.

Following budget cuts (which also resulted in the program being shortened from two hours each night to one), Andrew Craig took over as permanent host of the program. In 2013, the program was reduced to a single airing per week, hosted by Garvia Bailey.

The program is now hosted by Angeline Tetteh-Wayoe. It is also repeated Friday afternoons on CBC Radio One.

== Notable performances ==
On April 7 and December 6, 2007, the program broadcast the final concert by Canadian indie rock band Rheostatics, recorded on March 30.

On April 7, 2008, the program aired a tribute concert to Oliver Schroer, who died of leukemia later that year; the program was rebroadcast on July 9, two days after Schroer's death.

On July 10, 2008, the program broadcast a special tribute concert to Jimi Hendrix, featuring noted Canadian musicians including Jim Byrnes, Randy Bachman, Steve Dawson, The Sojourners and Ndidi Onukwulu, performing Hendrix songs in the recently restored Vancouver home of Hendrix's grandmother Nora.
