= The 180 =

- Genre: talk show
- Country of origin: Canada
- Home station: CBC Radio
- Hosted by: Jim Brown
- Recording studio: Calgary, Alberta
- Original release: 2013 – 2017

The 180 was a Canadian radio talk show, which aired weekly on CBC Radio One from 2013 to 2017. Hosted by Jim Brown from the network's studio in Calgary, Alberta, the show highlighted issues in the news by interviewing guests with provocative or unusual perspectives that differ from conventional wisdom, in the hopes of sparking debate on topics of public interest. For instance, after the 2013 Supreme Court of Canada decision that struck down Canada's existing prostitution laws, while most media outlets interviewed sex workers about the decision The 180 opted to highlight a lesser-heard perspective by interviewing a pimp.

The show originally aired Sunday evenings at 8 p.m. In May 2014, the network announced that the show would move to a Sunday morning slot in September, concurrent with a reduction of The Sunday Edition's running time from three hours to two. In June 2017, Brown announced that the show would not be returning to the CBC radio schedule in the fall.
