= Canada Live (1992 radio program) =

Canada Live was a weekend show which aired on CBC Radio in 1992 and 1993; initially hosted by Jack Farr as a replacement for The Radio Show, the program was a live call-in show whose concept was for Farr to talk to ordinary Canadians about everyday topics.

Farr lasted just a few weeks as host of the program before announcing his departure, calling it "not a good fit", and was succeeded by Kris Purdy.

The program was cancelled in 1993, and was replaced by Brand X.
