= Sound Advice =

Sound Advice was a radio show on CBC Radio. It aired for fourteen years on Saturday afternoons, latterly on CBC Radio 2. The host was Rick Phillips. Its final broadcast was on March 29, 2008.

As of April 22, 2008, a stream of new programming was to appear every two weeks on Universal Music's web page. Streams were to be archived.

The show reviewed recordings of classical music and, except in special themed shows, a rating of up to five stars was given. The program advised listeners on building up a library of classical music. The show also aimed to impart discriminating distinctions so that listeners will become skilled in forming their own opinions. To further this instructive effort, different recordings of the same piece were often played in succession to illustrate different (and sometimes substandard) approaches in the performance.
