= Nightfall (radio series) =

Canadian radio drama series

- Cover art for 1984 Nightfall cassette
- Genre: Horror and suspense anthology
- Running time: 30 minutes
- Country of origin: Canada
- Language: English
- Syndicates: CBC Radio
- Hosted by: Henry Ramer; Bill Reiter
- Created by: Bill Howell
- Written by: John Graham; John Douglas; Len Peterson; Arthur Samuels; Tim Wynne-Jones; George R. RobertsonLarry LeClair; Bill Gray
- Executive producers: Bill Howell; Don Kowalchuk
- Original release: July 4, 1980 – May 13, 1983
- No. of series: 3
- No. of episodes: 100

Nightfall was a radio drama series produced and aired by CBC Radio from July 1980 to June 1983. While primarily a supernatural/horror series, Nightfall featured some episodes in other genres, such as science fiction, mystery, fantasy, and human drama. According to promotional accounts repeated on fan sites, some of Nightfall's episodes were so terrifying that the CBC registered numerous complaints and some affiliate stations dropped it; however, at least one researcher who investigated the claim found no documented evidence that any station actually dropped the show over listener complaints, suggesting the story may be embellished promotional lore rather than a verified fact. Despite this, the series went on to become one of the most popular shows in CBC Radio history, running 100 episodes that featured a mix of original tales and adaptations of both classic and obscure short stories.

Nightfall was created by producer Bill Howell, who was known at the time for his work on CBC Playhouse, the sketch-comedy series Air Farce, and the cult adventure series, Johnny Chase: Secret Agent of Space. According to Howell, the idea for Nightfall grew out of a 1979 national producers' meeting in Banff, Alberta, convened by the newly appointed head of CBC Radio Drama, Susan Rubeš; though not a fan of the horror genre, Rubeš greenlit the production.

Bill Howell served as executive producer of Nightfall at CBC Toronto for the first two seasons. The third season was produced by Don Kowalchuk at CBC Vancouver.

Nightfall featured two hosts during its run. The Toronto years (1980–1982) were hosted by "the mysterious Luther Kranst", a character created by Bill Howell and played by character actor Henry Ramer. For its Vancouver run (1982–1983), Don Kowalchuk worked with voice actor Bill Reiter to develop the character of Frederick Hende.

The show's scripts were overseen by an editorial team led by John Gavin Douglas as the CBC Radio Drama area executive, who was joined by Howard Engel and Earl Toppings in reviewing and refining submissions from the show's writers.

== Production locations and people ==
Though series production was controlled from a central location, the anthology nature of Nightfall made it possible for episodes to be produced at CBC Radio facilities all over Canada:

=== CBC Toronto ===
No. of Episodes: 74
Frequent Actors: Elva Mai Hoover, John Stocker, Frank Perry, Sandy Webster, Ruth Springford, Marian Waldman, Neil Dainard, Hugh Webster, Chris Wiggins, Budd Knapp, Michael Wincott, Graham Haley, David Calderisi, Colin Fox, Arch McDonnell, Nicky Guadagni, Neil Munro, Mary Pirie, Linda Sorenson
Recording Engineers: John Jessop, Ray Folcik, John Hollinger, Jan Wright, David Hoyle, Tom Shipton, Brian Wood, Keith van der Clay, Brian Pape, Derek Stubbs, John McCarthy, Greg Fleet
Sound Effects: Bill Robinson, Matt Wilcott, Kathy Perry, Stephanie McKenna, Jerry Fielding
Production Assistants: Nina Callaghan, Doris Buchanan, Nancy McIlveen, Peggy Este
Producers: Bill Howell, Paul Mills, John Douglas, Stephen Katz, Fred Diehl, Peter Boretski, William Lane, Scott Swan

=== CBC Vancouver ===
No. of Episodes: 9
Frequent Actors: William Samples, Otto Lowy, Norman Browning, Anna Hagan
Recording Engineers: Gerry Stanley, Chris Cutress, Gene Loverock, Bill Seebach
Sound Effects: Joe Silva, Jay Hireen, Chris Cutress
Production Assistants: Ann Elvidge, Dagmar Kaffanke, Loretta Joyce, Joyce Tinnion
Producers: Don Kowalchuk, John Juliani, Robert Chesterman

=== CBC Edmonton ===
No. of Episodes: 7
Frequent Actors: Brian Taylor, Graham McPherson, Nicole Evans, Gordon Mariott, Bill Meilen, Stephen Walsh, Blair Haynes
Recording Engineers: Al Lamden
Sound Effects: Eric Wagers, Deane Purves
Production Assistants: Barbara Gault
Producers: Lawrie Seligman

=== CBC Montréal ===
No. of Episodes: 4
Frequent Actors: Vlasta Vrána, Philip Akin, Timothy Webber, Earl Pennington
Recording Engineers: André Fleury, Giles LaRoche
Sound Effects: Pierre Lucie, Rene LeVois
Production Assistants: Jane Lewis, Nancy Carter
Producers: John Juliani, John Jessop

=== CBC Halifax ===
No. of Episodes: 3
Frequent Actors: Joseph Rutten, John Fulton
Recording Engineers: Rod Sneddon, Keith DeLong
Sound Effects: Dermot Kenny, Harold Porter
Production Assistants: Claire McIlveen
Producers: Elizabeth Fox, Ewan "Sudsy" Clark

=== CBC Calgary ===
No. of Episodes: 1
Frequent Actors: David Ferry, Heather Lea McCallum
Recording Engineers: Rick Fenton
Sound Effects: Norm Hurley
Production Assistants: Elaine Farner
Producers: Bill Gray

=== CBC St. Johns ===
No. of Episodes: 1
Frequent Actors: Frank Holden, Pat Vern
Recording Engineers: John Foster
Sound Effects: Wayne Hayes
Production Assistants: Noreen George
Producers: Glen Tilley

=== Clack Sound Studios, NYC ===
No. of Episodes: 1
Frequent Actors: F. Peter Lee
Recording Engineers: Tom Courtenay-Clack
Sound Effects: Tom Courtenay-Clack
Production Assistants: n/a
Producers: Tom Courtenay-Clack

== Episode guide ==
=== Season One ===
No. overall	No. in season	Title	Written by	Original release date
1	1	"Love and the Lonely One"	John Graham	4 July 1980
Two medical students, Fred and George, steal the body of an elderly lady from the anatomy lab of their school to perform a joke. However, the prank causes a girl from another dimension to come to life and begin to interfere in Fred’s life, before he succumbs and joins her in death.
2	2	"The Monkey's Paw"	Len Peterson	11 July 1980
Mr and Mrs White, and their adult son are introduced to a mummified monkey’s paw which grants them three wishes. Each wish is granted, however these always occur via hellish and unintended consequences.
3	3	"Welcome to Homerville"	Don Dickinson and Allan Guttman	18 July 1980
A lonely trucker, RC, is heading towards Homerville. Fellow drivers and others along the way are horrified to learn of his destination and beg for him to avoid Homerville at all costs, however as he continues to drive, the destination gets further away.
4	4	"Hands Off"	John Graham	25 July 1980
A scientist experimenting with hostility in animals accidentally spills a chemical on his hand which causes animosity toward him. He resorts to killing his assistant and the lab security guard, before being chased into by guard dogs. Sensing no escape, he chops off his hand before suffocating.
5	5	"The Telltale Heart"	Len Peterson	1 August 1980
A drifter goes to work on a farm for an old man, and becomes obsessed with the man’s “evil eye”, resorting to eventually killing him and stashing his body beneath the floor. When the police come to check on the farm, his guilt begins to increase and the sound of a heartbeat takes over.
6	6	"Late Special"	Clint Bomphray	8 August 1980
A car crash in bad weather leads to a couple becoming injured, with the man unable to move and the woman unable to see. Despite this, the woman heads out to seek help and finds an abandoned railway station where a strange man offers a deal in exchange for fixing her eyesight.
7	7	"Future Fear"	John Graham	15 August 1980
A middle-aged couple find their television set is receiving a strange broadcast showing them the future. When they see visions of their sons involvement in a fascist regime, they debate whether to take action in the present and kill him.
8	8	"How Did You Get My Name?"	Don Dickinson and Allan Guttman	22 August 1980
A man is released from a mental hospital and stays with an old friend. He immediately begins to receive phone calls and mail to the address and goes on to discover his own life and that of his friends is not what he thought it was. With Gordon Thomson.
9	9	"The Body Snatchers"	Frank W. McEnaney	29 August 1980
Fettes comes across eminent doctor Macfarlane with whom he attended medical school, and recalls their work in taking bodies for dissection and paying the shifty men who deliver the corpses.
10	10	"The Willoughby Obsession"	George R. Robertson	5 September 1980
Charles Willoughby, a lawyer for powerful underworld people dies of a heart attack shortly after his wife is electrocuted in the bath tub. Paul, a reporter is convinced supernatural powers are at play due to a number of oddities with the case.
11	11	"No Admittance/No Exit"	Don Bailey and Milo Ringham	12 September 1980
In a garage, a female employee badly injures her hand which results in the owner and a customer rushing her to hospital. Arriving at a futuristic clinic, the group find a torturous procedure to navigate in their attempts to get help.
12	12	"Wind Chill"	David McCaughna	19 September 1980
After becoming stuck in a snow drift while searching for her friends cottage, Sue meets Barry who offers her shelter. Arriving at the cabin, events take a turn for the stranger when Sue begins to hear voice-like noises and Barry tells her the story of his younger brother who drowned.
13	13	"The Repossession"	Arthur Samuels	26 September 1980
Robert, a surviving conjoined twin, begins having nightmares about the death of his brother Douglas thirty years ago. He begins to feel that his twin brother is somehow responsible for oddities occurring in his life. Finally encountering Douglas, he finds his brother has set out to destroy him.
14	14	"The Stone Ship"	Len Peterson	3 October 1980
The Alfred Jessop enters the tropics having left London, and encounters a ghostly graveyard of ships. The crew come across a ship made of solid stone where they also find the ghosts of the tough old captain and crew.
15	15	"Special Services"	Martin Kinch	10 October 1980
A couple rush to see their aunt after being informed she is dying. They are involved in a car crash on the way after encountering four ambulances. In the hospital, the situation becomes weirder when a staff member mentions special services they offer relating to organs for important people.
16	16	"Buried Alive"	John Graham	17 October 1980
The Great Santini, a hypnotist, has a plan to defraud his insurance company of half a million dollars by faking his own death and allowing himself to be buried alive. However, his assistants who are supposed to dig him up have other ideas.
17	17	"Last Visit"	Ray Will	24 October 1980
The Lundens are on their way to visit their daughter, but are forced by a terrible fog in Newfoundland to stop at the Eternity Cove Hotel and Lounge. However, Eternity Cove is a place populated by seemingly one man and the fog plays tricks on those who visit.
18	18	"Ringing the Changes"	P. Norman Cherrie	31 October 1980
Gerald and Phrynne Halstead arrive in Holyhaven where they stay in the Bell Hotel. However, everyone in the small town believes they have arrived at the wrong time – October 31st – and the town has a secret it is desperate to keep.
19	19	"The Devil's Backbone"	Silver Donald Cameron	7 November 1980
In the sea close to Halifax, Nova Scotia in the area known as the Devil’s Backbone, two divers try to find a sunken treasure. They experience problems with one finding claw marks on his diving suit upon returning to the surface, and hear of a curse, which inhabits the area.
20	20	"The Blood Countess, Part 1: Blood Red"	Ray Canale	14 November 1980
Based on the historic story of Countess Elizabeth Báthory de Ecsed, the Blood Countess of Hungary. The story begins with the death soon after of her husband Count Ferencz Báthory, which is the impetus for his wife’s heinous crimes.
21	21	"The Blood Countess, Part 2: Blood Blue"	Ray Canale	21 November 1980
The countess attempts to summon her husband’s return from death, as a number of the people in the village work out that she is behind the murders of peasant girls in the village for their blood. She is subsequently sentenced to a fitting punishment.
22	22	"Deadly Developments"	Arlene Ezrin	28 November 1980
Professional photographer André Phillipe and his assistant Steve prepare for a photo shoot for an upcoming horror novel. They have acquired a Von Hensdorf – a rare camera from pre-war Germany – which has an unusual outcome when used.
23	23	"Where Does the News Come From?"	James D. (Jimmy) Morris	5 December 1980
Foreign news correspondent David Winston returns from Rome and is offered a news anchor position, replacing a friend who walks from the job and into a padded cell. Winston soon finds a range of conspiracy-laden tales from long-time friend Stella.
24	24	"Where Do We Go From Here?"	Max Ferguson	12 December 1980
Neville Edwards is involved in a car accident though still very much alive. However, the gathering crowd around him see him as dead. Neville recalls his days events, awaits aid to ‘save’ him from his increasing panic. It is only once in the morgue that he begins to realise what is happening.
25	25	"On Christmas Day in the Morning"	Don Dickinson and Allan Guttman	19 December 1980
A local mail carrier is killed by a hit-and-run driver on Christmas morning. The mayor’s son and his girlfriend are thought responsible for the incident, however the police must prove their case by working out how the mail carrier made his final delivery to a reclusive old lady, after he was killed.
26	26	"The Appetite of Mr. Lucraft"	P. Norman Cherrie	26 December 1980
Down on his luck, Mr. Lucraft is an actor who is on the point of starvation. A man named Ebeneezer Grumbelow offers him a feast, which he accepts, before also offering to buy his Lucraft’s appetite. However, on agreeing to the deal, Lucraft begins to experience the terms of the arrangement. Based on a short story by Walter Besant and James Rice
27	27	"The Guest of Honour"	Len Peterson	2 January 1981
Elderly Lady Flora Neville, renowned for hosting elaborate balls, has become bored of the same guests. She longs to invite a guest who would rouse her, and decides on Death himself. However, upon agreeing to attend the party, Death is not what anyone expected.
28	28	"A Short Wave Good-bye"	George R. Robertson	9 January 1981
Middle-aged bookkeeper Harvey Beasley has an argument with his wife Harriet, during which his prized shortwave radio is damaged. However, the damage has the impact of allowing them to hear broadcasts from the near future.
29	29	"They Bite"	Len Peterson	16 January 1981
Hugh Blair, a former Vietnam war hero has an interest in palaeontology, and finds a collection of bones in the Nevada desert. The bones turn out to be a Stegosaur, however something else lurks in the desert that haunts Blair.
30	30	"Dark Side of the Mind"	Max Ferguson	23 January 1981
During a wave of child-murders which terrorise a city, dentist Jeff Robbins and his wife Myrna encounter old friend Carl and invite him over for a visit. However, when Jeff is called away, he discovers startling news about Carl.
31	31	"Wildcats"	Otto Lowy/Christian Noak	27 February 1981
A man, Julian, gets off at the wrong train station and has to spend the night at the Blue Trout Inn, an old rundown hotel run by two sisters who live in fear of the local wildcats. After many years alone, the pair plot to keep Julian there to make up for the emptiness in their lives.
32	32	"The Room"	Graham Haley	6 March 1981
A widow offers a large sum to anyone who is willing to spend a night in the Yellow Room - a room in which her husband died many years prior. She advises that a number of men have previously attempted the feat but they either go mad or die of fright, though skeptical young Ronald Todd decides to try.
33	33	"Angel's Kiss"	John Graham and George R. Robertson	20 March 1981
Chuck is a homophobic, womanising salesman who trawls the disco scene for women. He picks up Delores from the club who leaves quickly the following morning after "getting what she wants" despite Chuck's begging to stay. Chuck starts to fall apart chasing Delores, and comes across her trail of destruction.
34	34	"The Book of Hell"	Mavor Moore	27 March 1981
Two editors and a president of a failing publishing company receive a strange manuscript from a reclusive author... who happens to have been dead for two years. The book tells of a first-hand account of a soul's experience while in Hell. However, the book cannot be printed, photocopied or recorded in any way.
35	35	"Mkara"	Graham Haley	3 April 1981
In 1943, Dr. Ray Park arrives in Ethiopia to help naturalist Charles Woodley. Woodley believes he is dying due to a curse placed on him by Mkara, the brother of a witch doctor, after he kills an elephant worshipped by the regions tribes. Ray offers to take the curse upon himself.
36	36	"The Fatal Eggs"	Arthur Samuels	17 April 1981
An aging zoologist accidentally discovers that he has produced an amphibian that can breed rapidly and grows to an abnormally large size. Confirming the experiment, he soon comes to the attention of the Soviet secret service, who plan on using the animals to their advantage.
37	37	"Breaking Point"	Max Ferguson	1 May 1981
A storm results in a circus cancelling a show. Star performer Tania, ends up in a fight with her boss and lover Ernie, when he believes she is seeing someone else, and eventually firing her. However, Ernie has an unexpected visitor in his office, which results in his death.
38	38	"All-Nighter"	Graham Pomeroy	15 May 1981
A worker at a laundromat, Cheryl, encounters evidence of murders committed by a killer who washes then dries the victims. Finding blood on a customer’s clothes, she takes to speaking with Officer Charlie Burns who visits the laundromat, and takes on the investigation.

=== Season Two ===
No. overall	No. in season	Title	Written by	Original release date
39	1	"Carmilla"	John Douglas and Graham Pomeroy	20 November 1981
Set in the Black Forest in Germany, a wealthy man and his daughter receive a mysterious house guest who has to be left with them while on a journey. The guest, Carmilla, has a secret life however which threatens to destroy anyone who encounters her.
40	2	"In the Eye of the Beholder"	Burke Campbell	27 November 1981
A doctor advises ill-tempered farmer, Jack, to have eye surgery before he goes completely blind. Returning home, a mysterious young man shows up and offers to help him when his car breaks down, however the farmer's past comes back to haunt him.
41	3	"Cemetery Stop"	Margery Stewart	4 December 1981
A bus driver struggles after the death of his wife, and his regular route proves difficult with him being late and missing stops. On a lonely section of the run, he finds that a woman keeps getting off at the cemetery, leading him to need to find out where she is going.
42	4	"In the Name of the Father"	Janet Bonellie	11 December 1981
A writer takes a holiday by the coast on the advice of her friends, and falls into a Lovecraft-like nightmare. She soon finds that sharks off the coast foretell the town’s mass-pregnancy with the local church being dedicated to the sea, and the women giving birth to sharks.
43	5	"Baby Doll"	Larry LeClair	18 December 1981
Young husband, Alex, buys his wife Kathleen an antique doll for their anniversary. However, during the night Kathleen hears a baby crying, which becomes the first of a number of incidents in which she takes to mothering the doll like a real child.
44	6	"Reunion at the Victory Café"	Tom MacDonnell	1 January 1982
A man takes his wife to the Victory Café in London, where his father died during a World War II blitz. While there, he is teleported back in time to 1944 where he meets his father, and then attempts to save the patrons when a plane is heard overhead.
45	7	"Gerald"	Bill Gray	8 January 1982
Gerald, a child, has an evil imaginary friend, Tom, that uses his help to capture souls of those he has killed. His parents fail to spot his sociopathic tendencies, even when their dog and his friend Ricky, are found tortured and killed.
46	8	"Mindrift"	F. Peter Lee	15 January 1982
An economic adviser working at the treasury is hypnotised to only remember what he is supposed to do when triggered by the previous step, to ensure his mind remains clear. He discovers himself buying a gun and attending the U.N. General Assembly.
47	9	"Your Fortune in Twenty Words or Less"	Larry LeClair	22 January 1982
An old man, Mercurian, pays a visit to a two-bit carnival fortune teller, and bestows true clairvoyant powers upon him, though this comes at a price when he starts to misuse the powers for his own advantage and proving himself untrustworthy.
48	10	"Teddy"	Stephen Freygood	29 January 1982
Teddy, a five-year-old hears the constant noise of other people's thoughts in his own mind. His torment continues as other people use him for their own selfish ends, including his own parents. However, Teddy may not be completely helpless to prevent them.
49	11	"Child's Play"	Arthur Samuels	5 February 1982
Arthur and Mary inherit her parents home - an opulent mansion - and visit it for the first time. Mary's repressed childhood memories of her strict, religious upbringing come flooding back to haunt her as well as the murder of her parents in her own bedroom.
50	12	"The Club of Dead Men"	John Douglas	12 February 1982
The story of a young Cambridge student, Jim Warner, who learns of a debauched eighteenth century club that continues to meet even after its members have died. He wonders whether he can also attend one of the meetings and survive.
51	13	"The Thinking Room"	Tim Wynne-Jones	19 February 1982
A man, known by everyone as 'Stink', considers committing suicide. However, he encounters 'Drum' who questions him before leading him to a room where he can finally hear his own thoughts. Meeting with a number of other people, he finds himself at The Suicide Club.
52	14	"The Porch Light"	Randy Brown	26 February 1982
On the night of a snowstorm, a married couple wake up in their isolated home to find their porch light has been inexplicably turned on. The appearance of a man on the porch leads Bob to having to admit to his wife he has a secret about the house.
53	15	"Volcano"	Roy (T.E.) Sallows	5 March 1982
A psychiatrist meets with a poor-performing boxer after he loses a fight, and offers experimental methods to get him to be able to win. However, the doctor does not reveal that the methods are a continued experiment from his working with test animals.
54	16	"The Monkey's Raincoat"	Charles Tidler	12 March 1982
A newly elected American president must prove himself by eliminating several assassins on his way to the White House after his inauguration process. The events are broadcast like a sporting event to the watching public.
55	17	"From My Appointed Place Below"	John Douglas	19 March 1982
Set in Scotland in the 1800s, a young man delivers his rent payment to the local laird. However, the latter dies before a receipt can be written, and the money disappears. The young man has to turn to a stranger for help.
56	18	"The Old Post Road"	William Lane	26 March 1982
Steven and Wendy, a couple, are very late and heading to a dinner event at Wendy's parents. They decide take a shortcut down a deserted road, but in the rush, end up crashing. This leads to a string of increasingly bizarre paranormal events.
57	19	"The Debt"	John Richard Wright	2 April 1982
A fraternity ritual results in a young man, Ricky Lee, being killed when he is cut in half by a train. The fraternity brothers bury him hoping to be done with the situation. However, Ricky Lee's ghost sets about collecting on the debt the men owe him.
58	20	"Harris and the Mare"	John Douglas	9 April 1982
A man who is known for his placid nature and fondness of the old ways, has an outlook that mankind is generally good. However, this world view is shattered when his wife is killed in a bar fight while the pair enjoy a night out, and the other townsfolk do nothing to help.
59	21	"The Jogger"	Tony Bell	16 April 1982
Joe Brady, a faded former high-school football star, now in his forties, feels dejected with his current life, marriage and his self. He spots a jogger outside his house who begins to appear everywhere regularly, and feels he must catch him at all costs.
60	22	"The Screaming Skull"	Guy Babineau	23 April 1982
A retired sailor speaks with a doctor and relates the tale of why he has become haunted by a screaming skull. His best friend leaves his house to him, before he murders his wife and kills himself. The woman's spirit refuses to go to its grave, and haunts the house in which her body now resides.
61	23	"Mr. Agostino"	Janet Bonellie	30 April 1982
Carol is plagued by a mysterious man who keeps calling her telephone and asking for a Mr. Agostino. Hoping after each call it will be the last, and failing to take heed of her friend Betty's advice on not talking to him, eventually they talk and he shows up at her door uninvited.
62	24	"The Road Ends at the Sea"	Tim Wynne-Jones	7 May 1982
Heading to confront a friend about an affair he has been having with his wife, a man drives out to the lighthouse where the couple now lives. But when he arrives, the pair seem more interested in a strange black ship which has appeared just offshore.
63	25	"The Maid's Bell"	John Douglas	14 May 1982
Alice Hartley, a servant takes a new job as lady's maid in a large country mansion. She is introduced to the building by another friendly maid, Agnes, however there is some mystery surrounding a service bell which should never be rang.
64	26	"A Glimpse of Eternity"	Ian Weir	28 May 1982
A university professor has been researching reversal of the ageing process, and manages to reanimate a friends dead dog. Seeing this remarkable feat, his friend wants the professor to reverse his age as he laments getting older.
65	27	"Beyond the Law"	Steve Petch	4 June 1982
An unlikeable and unscrupulous real estate developer finds his business partners have started being murdered. He decides to retaliate against a Tenant's Association that blames, however the real murderer is closer to home.
66	28	"The Turn of the Blood"	Paul Bettis	11 June 1982
In the 1800s, Farmer Lodge returns with his new, young wife Gertrude. Warning her off interacting with anyone, she eventually meets his ex-wife and neighbour, Rhoda, and their son. Rhoda dreams of a struggle with Gertrude, which results in an injury appearing on Gertrude's arm.
67	29	"Reverse Image"	Arthur Samuels	18 June 1982
A man arrives home to his wife, who is angry that he has purchased an antique mirror. Treating him with contempt, he is forced to move it up to the attic. However, when he looks into the mirror, he sees an alter ego, which offers to take revenge for him on people who have treated him badly.
68	30	"Teig O'Kane and the Corpse"	John Douglas	25 June 1982
Trouble-making Irishman Teig O'Kane refuses to wed a woman whose reputation he has besmirched. He is set a task by fairies of burying a talkative corpse before the sun rises, which results in a considerable change in his personality.

=== Season Three ===
No. overall	No. in season	Title	Written by	Original release date
69	1	"This One Will Kill You"	Arthur Samuels	1 October 1982
Stand-up Danny is a dreadful comedian and continues to perform night after night in a club. The owner decides to fire him, and with Danny feeling greatly rejected, he decides to kill himself. His last request is a roast from former student and successful comedian, Steve.
70	2	"Footsteps"	Larry LeClair	8 October 1982
An advertising executive, David, narrowly misses being killed by a truck while heading to lunch with his wife. Returning from being checked over at the hospital, he then becomes obsessed with the sound of footsteps following behind him wherever he goes.
71	3	"Lifeline"	Frank Moher	15 October 1982
In an apartment fire, a man is rescued but severely burns his hands badly enough to lose the lines on his skin. He speaks to a psychic who had predicted the events, but comes to realise that no one can ever remember him.
72	4	"The Tie That Binds"	Nika Rylski	22 October 1982
A man relates the story of how he came to be consigned to an asylum, after drinking then crashing his car and killing his wife. Hearing a voice inside his head, he suffers after effects of the crash, which have no physical basis.
73	5	"The Dentist"	Bill Gray	29 October 1982
A woman accepts a job as an assistant to dentist Dr. Stewart, who often treats the poor for free. However, she begins to suspect that something is wrong when the patients leave the office in a disassociated state, and hatches a plan using her husband.
74	6	"Assassin Game"	John G. Fisher	5 November 1982
In the future, the world is controlled by rival corporations who test university students for their potential cunning as future executives. However, when one student rejects a job offer that doesn't take no for an answer, the game becomes more intense.
75	7	"Lazarus Rising"	John Douglas	12 November 1982
Arriving in a small town, a reporter discovers a web of revenge and sorcery while investigating a report that a man rose from the dead. He discovers that the man, George Sannox, was murdered and his daughter resurrected him for vengeance.
76	8	"Young Goodman Brown"	John Douglas	19 November 1982
A young man, Goodman Brown, ventures into the woods as dusk falls. He stumbles across a Satanic ritual featuring the townspeople of Salem, including his own wife. The following morning, his faith in Christianity is shaken as he is uncertain whether the events of the night were real.
77	9	"But, Oh, What Happened to Hutchings!"	Roy (T. E. Sallows)	26 November 1982
In the nineteenth century in England, times are hard and employment is difficult to come by. Grave robbing has become a lucrative business, though some people have decided to speed up the process rather than wait for people to die of natural causes.
78	10	"Daddy's Girl"	Janet Bonellie	3 December 1982
A man takes a trip to an island in the West Indies, and gets on the wrong side of a young girl who practices black magic. He faces a battle to escape the island and tell the authorities of the strange deaths that have occurred.
79	11	"The Cruel Husband"	David Leicester	10 December 1982
A count discovers his wife's infidelity. He sets about ensuring it doesn't happen again by bricking up the closet wall behind which her lover hides, and then spends several days ignoring the mans screams by her bedside.
80	12	"The Signalman"	Otto Lowy	17 December 1982
A railway signalman is starting to be driven insane by a spectre that appears in the mouth of a train tunnel. The apparition has previously appeared before a tragedy, and has begun to appear again.
81	13	"Watching"	Bryan Wade	31 December 1982
A "peeping tom" invents a girlfriend to compensate for his lack of success with women. However, his friends begin to suspect, so he resorts to extremes to ensure his girlfriend is real and faithful to him.
82	14	"The Strange Odyssey of Lennis Freed"	Tim Wynne-Jones	7 January 1983
A middle-aged couple take a vacation. Winter has arrived and there is bad weather around, and the couple find that a sick man, Lennis Freed, also arrives at every place that they visit despite the conditions.
83	15	"Weather Station Four"	Arthur Samuels	14 January 1983
Two men began trapped by a violent storm at a remote weather station in the Arctic. The rookie of the pair begins to hear a female voice on the radio goading him into madness and to commit murder.
84	16	"The Brides of Olivera"	Larry Gaynor	21 January 1983
A woman has been having dreams and her partner Ralph takes her to fortune teller, Olivera. She recognises Olivera from his dreams and believes him to be an infamous serial killer who uses his psychic power to kill.
85	17	"The Contract"	John Richard Wright	28 January 1983
A young man finds himself in debt to a man he met in prison. He resorts to borrowing the money from his wealthy wife who agrees to bail him out. However, his heavy debts aren't for the gambling losses he claims.
86	18	"Beauty's Beast"	Burke Campbell	4 February 1983
An industrial researcher makes his daughter beautiful after a car accident using an experimental technique. However, her new found looks attract a suitor who her father can not pay off to leave her.
87	19	"The Angel of Death"	Raymond Storey	11 February 1983
During the first world war, a woman becomes haunted by the mournful cries of her brother emanating from the attic of the family home after he is killed on the Western Front.
88	20	"Semi-Detached"	Shawn Selway	18 February 1983
A young girl living in a foster home looks to be facing homelessness when her guardians announce they expecting a child, leading to strange and supernatural events beginning to happen around the house. A psychiatrist begins to investigate the occurrences.
89	21	"A Glaze of Perfect Beauty"	Stephen Freygood	25 February 1983
A pottery maker accidentally knocks his assistant into the kiln, and finds that human ash makes the best glazes. However, he also finds that the quality of the person affects the quality of the glaze, and sets about seeking perfection.
90	22	"No Quarter"	Phil Savath	4 March 1983
Paul becomes addicted to video games, which are beginning to take over his life. His wife begins a campaign against games, but he continues to play, taking on a new game, which appears to get more real each time he plays.
91	23	"The Undertaker"	John Douglas	11 March 1983
A mortician who has a reputation as a ladies' man sets about preparing the body of a woman who loved him, and reminisces about the times they had together with a sense of guilt and grief.
92	24	"Private Collection"	Warren Graves	18 March 1983
Young women begin disappearing downtown in the middle of the day, and Constable Wood has to figure out what is happening. When another woman goes missing, he finds that all signs point to a government building with a research lab.
93	25	"The Hit"	Laurence Gough	25 March 1983
Two bumbling and bickering hitmen, one a veteran and another that is relatively new to the business, head for a job. The "target" arrives however the victim is in for a surprise.
94	26	"Walter's Dog"	Larry LeClair	1 April 1983
An alcoholic lobsterman is unhappy with the treatment he receives from his boss. He decides to murder him by throwing him overboard, in order to become "man enough" as well as claim the insurance money for their boat.
95	27	"Safe in the Arms of Jesus"	Martin Kinch	8 April 1983
A couple become concerned when their young son begins watching television evangelists and takes on a fanatical attitude. His mother takes to speaking with his school, and has to reveal that his father was also strongly religious before he killed himself.
96	28	"The Wedding"	Phil Savath	15 April 1983
In the 1600s, a Jewish family begins planning a wedding. With a plague having passed the village recently, a jester offers performs at the wedding and the father-of-the-bride reneges on payment. The wedding party find out that it has consequences.
97	29	"Hypnotized"	Jesse Bodyan	22 April 1983
A woman currently hypnotized begins remembering a previous, disturbing incarnation of herself, in which she sees herself with an attachment to the Devil. Her new psychiatrist begins to try and reduce her dependency on her previous doctor and complete the experiment underway.
98	30	"After Sunset"	Brian Taylor	29 April 1983
Fifty years after a small town suffers a number of murders, the killings begin again. Some of the elderly residents believe that the murderer is back, and may be an entity both ancient and evil.
99	31	"Servants of Cerberus"	Mary Humphrey Baldridge	6 May 1983
A wealthy, successful businesswoman has become bedridden by disease and has visions of dogs that speak to her, as well as a secretary that wants to run away with her cheating husband.
100	32	"Waters Under the Bridge"	Gaëtan Charlebois	13 May 1983
A man recalls a story to a reporter, in which a bridge collapsed killing many people. However, there is reputed to be treasure in the waters and a diving expedition sets about finding it, though the watery depths are known to contain evil.

== Incidental music ==
The incidental music from Nightfall was sourced from production music libraries such as Selected Sound and Bruton Music. Compositions from artists such as Klaus Weiss, Gerhard Trede, and Berry Lipman can be heard in various episodes throughout the series.
