= ReVision Quest =

ReVision Quest is a radio documentary program that aired on CBC Radio One in the summers of 2008 through 2011.

The program's name references historical revisionism and vision quests; it is hosted by Darrell Dennis, and explores the roles of First Nations people in modern society while challenging popular racial and cultural stereotypes. The basic content is Dennis presenting the subject through interviews, with short comedy sketches illustrating particular elements of the episode's subject. Other contributors to the program included Wab Kinew, Waubgeshig Rice, Rosanna Deerchild, Ryan McMahon and Craig Lauzon.

The episode "Jesus vs. Nanabush", an exploration of the competing effects of Christianity and traditional indigenous religions on contemporary First Nations culture, won an award for best religious program at the New York Festival Radio Awards in 2010. The show was a three-time winner of awards in the Best Radio category at the imagineNATIVE Film and Media Arts Festival in 2008, 2009 and 2010.
