= In the Key of Charles =

Canadian radio program

In the Key of Charles was a Canadian radio program, which aired on CBC Radio One and CBC Radio 2. Hosted by musician Gregory Charles, the program aired a variety of musical selections chosen by Charles to reflect a particular theme each week.

On March 26, 2009 the CBC announced that the program would be cancelled.
