= Commotion (radio show) =

Canadian radio program

Commotion is a Canadian radio program, which debuted January 30, 2023 on CBC Radio One. Hosted by Elamin Abdelmahmoud, the program is a half-hour daily magazine show on pop culture, featuring conversations with guests on current and trending topics in entertainment.

The program took over some of the mandate of the network's existing program Q, which concurrently transitioned into a program more strongly focused on Tom Power's longform interviews. It also replaced Abdelmahmoud's existing weekly program Pop Chat.

The program airs at 11:05 a.m. local time (11:35 NT) weekdays, following Q.
