= Writers & Company =

Writers & Company, hosted by Eleanor Wachtel, was CBC Radio's flagship literary program, broadcast weekly across Canada and internationally through satellite radio, online streaming and podcast. For more than 30 years, the program earned wide acclaim and a dedicated following for its hour-long, in-depth interviews with exceptional writers from around the world. The show aired Sunday afternoons on CBC Radio One at 5:00 p.m. Manitoba and west, 3:00 p.m. Ontario and east, 3:30 p.m. Newfoundland and Labrador. It repeated on Tuesdays at 3:00 p.m. in areas where the CBC Radio's local show began at 4:00 p.m.

== History ==
Writers & Company debuted on CBC Radio in October 1990. While originally conceived as an arts magazine show, under executive producer Anne Gibson, it soon evolved into a program devoted to international writing, drawing on the interests and strengths of Wachtel and founding producer Sandra Rabinovitch. At the time it was unusual to dedicate a full hour to a long-form interview with one author, but the format proved rewarding for both listeners and guests, who appreciated the close reading and intelligent discussion of their work.

A distinguishing feature of Writers & Company interviews was the attention paid to the writer's background and personal experience, as it related to their work. The long format also allowed for consideration of the writer's oeuvre and connecting themes. A reading from the work was often part of the conversation.

Writers & Company was broadcast for several years on Minnesota Public Radio, and interviews from the program were also broadcast, in abridged form, in the Friday night slot of The Arts Tonight, which aired on CBC Stereo.

The program's long-time producers were Sandra Rabinovitch and Mary Stinson.

== Guests ==
From its inception, Writers & Company featured interviews with leading fiction writers, poets, essayists, dramatists, filmmakers, biographers and critics. From Margaret Atwood, Philip Roth, Ryzsard Kapuscinski, and Mavis Gallant, to Hilary Mantel, A. S. Byatt, Chinua Achebe, Louise Erdrich, and Yiyun Li, the program's guests included many of the most exciting names in contemporary literature, both established and upcoming.

Fourteen winners of the Nobel Prize in Literature appeared on Writers & Company, often more than once, and before they’d been awarded the prize: Saul Bellow, Wole Soyinka, Joseph Brodsky, Nadine Gordimer, Derek Walcott, Toni Morrison, Seamus Heaney, J. M. Coetzee, Orhan Pamuk, Doris Lessing, Mario Vargas Llosa, Alice Munro, Kazuo Ishiguro, and Abdulrazak Gurnah.

Themed panel discussions, featuring several guests and often produced in connection with literary festivals, were also periodically broadcast on the program.

== Special programming ==
In addition to the high-profile individual interviews that distinguished Writers & Company, the program regularly featured special series recorded on location around the world. The 25 series, produced by Sandra Rabinovitch, sent Wachtel to such places as Brazil, Berlin 10 years after the fall of the Wall, Russia, South Africa, Argentina, New Zealand, Germany during the refugee crisis, and more. With titles such as Reinventing India: Writing Since Independence (1998), Writing in the World of Islam (2002), Memory and Myth: The Rebirth of Central Europe (2005), Franco's Ghosts: The Remaking of Spain (2011) and Darkness and Light: The Nordic Imagination (2018), the series expanded the range of the program .

On one of her more dramatic excursions in the field, Wachtel was in Santiago, Chile, during the 2010 earthquake – and still managed to record her interviews, during aftershocks.

The wide-ranging, thematic series Original Minds, broadcast in 2001, featured conversations with influential figures including Jonathan Miller, Jane Goodall, Desmond Tutu, Arthur C. Clarke, Susan Sontag, Jane Jacobs, Bernardo Bertolucci, Harold Bloom, Umberto Eco and Gloria Steinem. These interviews, plus others, were published in the 2003 collection titled Original Minds (HarperCollins).

== Literary festivals and onstage events ==
Wachtel was frequently invited to conduct onstage interviews at literary events, which were recorded for broadcast on Writers & Company. She appeared at the University of Alberta's Festival of Ideas, the reading series of the Toronto Public Library, and at literary festivals including the Toronto International Festival of Authors, the Vancouver Writers Fest, and Montreal's Blue Metropolis.

Writers & Company also produced interviews from international literary festivals such as Sri Lanka's Galle Literary Festival, India's Jaipur International Literature Festival and the Hay Festival Cartagena in Colombia, the Bookworm International Literary Festival in Beijing, the Istanbul Tanipar Literature Festival, the Cuirt International Festival of Literature in Galway, Ireland, and the SHIFT festival of Canadian and Dutch Arts in Amsterdam.

== Books and other publications ==
A selection of interviews from the program, titled Writers & Company, was published in 1993, followed by More Writers & Company in 1996 (Knopf Canada). Original Minds, with interviews from the special series, was published in 2003 by HarperCollins.

Random Illuminations, a collection of reflections, correspondence and conversations with Carol Shields (Gooselane Editions, 2007) won the Independent Publisher Book Award.

In 2016, in celebration of the program's 25th anniversary, Biblioasis published The Best of Writers & Company.

Selected interviews throughout the years have been published, by permission, in journals such as Queen's Quarterly and Brick: A Literary Journal.

== Honours ==
In 2002, Wachtel won the Jack Award for the promotion of Canadian books and authors.

In 2011, Writers & Company won a Silver Medal at the New York Festivals Radio Awards. Writers & Company twice won the coveted CBC Award for Programming Excellence for the best weekly show broadcast nationally, the judges noting that if they had to choose one hour of radio to take to a desert island, it would be Writers & Company. In 2023, Writers & Company won the New York Festivals Bronze medal for Best Interview.

== Music ==
The opening theme for Writers & Company was "Long as You Know You're Living Yours" by Keith Jarrett, from the album Belonging. Closing music was carefully chosen for each week's program to reflect the tone and content of the interview.

== Finale ==
Wachtel announced the end of Writers & Company, after 33 years on the air, in the spring of 2023. A celebratory event, recorded for broadcast as the program's last original episode, was held on June 16, 2023, at the Glenn Gould Theatre in Toronto. The event featured an onstage interview with Wachtel by Matt Galloway, host of CBC Radio's The Current; a conversation with two featured guests—American novelists Gary Shteyngart and Brandon Taylor—as well as surprise video and audio tributes from international writers such as Salman Rushdie, Jonathan Franzen, Colm Toibin, Zadie Smith, George Saunders, and Alexander Hemon.

The program continued on the air with "encores" from the program's archives, updated and freshly introduced by Wachtel, until the finale original episode on September 1, 2024. The show was replaced in 2024 by Bookends, hosted by Mattea Roach.

== Digital Archive ==
In the spring of 2024, Wachtel announced in the Sunday broadcast that the complete Writers & Company digital archive—over 1,000 hours of interviews--would be made available to the public online, free of charge, anywhere in the world, through a partnership with Simon Fraser University Library's Special Collections.
