= Freestyle (radio program) =

Freestyle was a radio program on the Canadian Broadcasting Corporation's Radio One network, which aired from 2005 to 2007. For the first year, the program's hosts were Cameron Phillips and Kelly Ryan; in December 2006, Ryan left the program and was replaced by Marsha Lederman. Freestyle combined contemporary popular music, predominantly but not exclusively by Canadian artists, with generally irreverent "water cooler" chat. The show also featured regular commentators including "music guy" Daniel Levitin and book reviewer Sara O'Leary. It first aired on November 9, 2005, replacing The Roundup.

The show received some criticism for purportedly sounding too much like commercial radio programming. Conversely, Kate Taylor of The Globe and Mail called the show relatively inoffensive and safe, but supported the CBC's desire to attract a younger listening audience.

Freestyle had its final broadcast on April 13, 2007, and was replaced on the CBC Radio One schedule by Q.

== Scheduling ==
Officially, Freestyle aired weekdays from 2:00 p.m. to 4:00 p.m. However, it was also one of the most variably-scheduled programs on the network — some stations aired only the first hour of the program, while others shifted the program to the 1:00 to 3:00 slot, and still others didn't air the program at all.

Only the first hour of Freestyle aired in Calgary, Edmonton, Ottawa, Toronto and Vancouver. In each of those markets, the local afternoon program started at 3:00 p.m. instead of 4:00. However, the stations' rebroadcast transmitters outside of the main markets aired all of Freestyle and then joined the host station's local program in progress at 4:00.

In Winnipeg, Freestyle aired from 1:00 to 3:00 p.m., airing the whole program but preempting the final hour of the regional noon-hour show. Again, however, rebroadcast transmitters outside of Winnipeg aired all of the noon show, then ran Freestyle in its normal time slot and joined the local afternoon show in progress at 4:00 p.m.

The program did not air at all in the Northwest Territories or Nunavut, as the CBC North stations in those territories entirely preempted the program in order to offer special local programming in aboriginal languages.
