= Global Village (Canadian radio show) =

Global Village was an entertainment program on the Radio One and Radio 2 networks of the Canadian Broadcasting Corporation, hosted by Jowi Taylor. It was heard on the Radio One network between 8:00 p.m. and 9:00 p.m. local time on Wednesdays, or 8:30 p.m. to 9:30 p.m. in Newfoundland, and on the Radio Two network between 6:30 p.m. and 7:30 p.m. Eastern Time on Saturdays. The program was also heard over Radio Canada International. The main concept of Global Village was a showcase of music from around the world, as well as news pertaining to international music.

In March 2007, the program was cancelled, although elements of it were incorporated into a new expanded one-hour edition of the documentary series Dispatches.
