= Laugh Out Loud (radio show) =

Laugh Out Loud is a Canadian radio show on CBC Radio One. Hosted by Ali Hassan, the series presents primarily audio recordings of stand up comedy performances, as well as some novelty songs. Although primarily recorded in studio, the series also records live performances in various popular venues across Canada. Commonly, the host also conducts a short interview with the comedian after each set.

The show was previously hosted by Craig Norris, Ali Rizvi Badshah (until July 2010) and Sabrina Jalees (until April 2010).
