= Now or Never (radio show) =

Canadian radio documentary series

Now or Never is a Canadian radio documentary series broadcast on CBC Radio One.

Hosted by Ify Chiwetelu and Trevor Dineen, the show features profiles of people making things happen, whether it be unusual businesses, community projects or other endeavours.
