= Canadia: 2056 =

Canadia: 2056 is a Canadian radio comedy series which premiered on CBC Radio One in April 2007. A science fiction comedy written by Matt Watts, the series centres on Max Anderson, the American liaison on board the only Canadian spaceship in an otherwise American space fleet headed toward a galactic war with the planet Ipampilash.

The premise of the series was summed up for promotional purposes:

It is the year 2056. The United States has launched an armada to destroy an alien threat. Canada sends the nation’s only publicly funded spacecraft, The Canadia – a ship with a single purpose. To plunge the Americans’ toilets. Travel with them.

In the second season, the Canadia became lost in time.

Canadia: 2056 first aired on CBC Radio One, on Fridays from 11:30 a.m. – 12:00 p.m.

== Cast ==
Matt Watts, in addition to his role as lead scriptwriter, also provided the voice of Midshipman Anderson. Other actors included Shauna MacDonald as the voice of the Canadia computer, and Donnelly Rhodes as the American president, providing the series' explanatory voice-over at the start of each episode. Other members of the cast include Stephanie Broschart as Margaux Faverau, Holly Lewis as Amanda Lewis, Paul O'Sullivan as the Captain, Chuck Shamata as Doc Gaffney, Tim Hamaguchi as the Crewman, Naomi Snieckus as Skip, Peter Wildman as Pickens, and Alyson Court as Connie.

== Crew ==
Greg DeClute directed and produced every episode except the two pilots, the first of which was directed by Tom Anniko, with Joe Mahoney doing post production. The second pilot was produced and directed by Joe Mahoney, who served as story editor for the rest of the series.

Anton Szabo did the sound effects for every episode except the two pilots, for which Joe Mahoney did the sound effects.

Tom Anniko was Executive Producer of both seasons.

== Theme music ==
Accompanying Rhodes' voiceover at the start of each episode is an instrumental interpretation of the song "Life on Mars?". At the end of each episode, the credits are read over the song "Gravity", taken from the Max Webster album High Class in Borrowed Shoes.

== See also ==
- Quark
- Hyperdrive
