= Shelley Solmes =

- Born: Toronto, Ontario, Canada
- Education: Carleton University; University of British Columbia
- Occupations: Journalist; radio broadcaster

Shelley Solmes is a Canadian journalist and radio broadcaster.

Solmes was born in Toronto. She studied journalism at Carleton University and the University of British Columbia and worked as a reporter and feature writer for the Vancouver Sun before joining CBC Radio, where she was associated with arts and classical music programming such as OnStage, Take Five and Here's to You. Take Five won a CBC Award for Programming Excellence in 2004.

Solmes is also an amateur classical pianist, who has studied under Anton Kuerti, Nadia Strycek and Katharina Wolpe.
