= Bunny Watson =

Canadian radio program

Bunny Watson was a Canadian radio program, which aired Saturdays on CBC Radio One and Sundays on CBC Radio Two.

Named for Katharine Hepburn's librarian character in the movie Desk Set, the show was hosted by Bill Richardson and produced by Jennifer Van Evra and Tod Elvidge in Vancouver. Inspired by the Hepburn character's quote that she "associates many things with many things", Richardson explored a particular theme each week through a free-association sequencing of music, literature and film.

The show first aired in the summer of 2004. In one of the show's most notable episodes, on October 2, 2004, the poet and performance artist Meryn Cadell came out as transgender.

The program ceased to air on the full CBC network in 2005, although repeats continued to air for some further time in Nunavut to fill a scheduling hole created by time zone differences, and on Radio One's Sirius Satellite Radio channel to fill a scheduling hole created by the satellite channel not broadcasting local programs.
