= DiscDrive (radio show) =

Former CBC Radio 2 Program

This is an article on the radio show. For the computer storage device, see disk storage.

DiscDrive was an afternoon show on CBC Radio 2 hosted by Jurgen Gothe. It played a mix of classical, traditional bluegrass, jazz, and commentary. It aired from 1985 to 2008, in the weekday afternoon drive time block from 3 to 6 p.m.

During the broadcast aired on February 19, 2008, Jurgen Gothe alluded to a discussion that the show was to end soon. He indicated that the program would go on throughout the spring and summer (of 2008), but after Labour Day he would be hosting a new program. The cancellation of DiscDrive was later confirmed, and the final broadcast was August 29, 2008. To mark the end of the program, Gothe staged a concert at the Vancouver Playhouse on August 14, featuring performances by A Touch of Brass, the Argentine tango trio Tangissomo, the Marc Atkinson Trio, Simon Kendall, Jim Byrnes, Sal Ferreras, Jack Duncan and Joseph Pepe Danza.

Shortly thereafter, Gothe returned as host of the new weekend classical music program Farrago, which aired for less than one year.

Gothe died on April 9, 2015, at his home in Vancouver, aged 71.
