= Vicki Gabereau =

Canadian broadcaster (born 1946)

- Born: Vicki Frances Filion; May 31, 1946 (age 79); Vancouver, British Columbia
- Occupations: Radio and TV personality
- Spouse(s): Michel Gabereau (m. 1965; div. 1980) Tom Rowe (m. 1982; died 2017)
- Children: Morgan Gabereau; Eve Gabereau; Katherine Makaroff (step-daughter)

Vicki Gabereau (born May 31, 1946) is a Canadian radio and television personality, best known for her longtime association with CBC Radio and her television talk show which aired on CTV from 1997 to 2005.

== Biography ==
Vicki Frances Filion was born in Vancouver. Her father's best friend, author Pierre Berton, was influential in her life, exposing Gabereau to the greatest intellectuals and stars of the 1950s and 1960s.

Gabereau moved to Toronto at age 18 for university. While there she married Michel Gabereau and worked a variety of jobs, including working as a professional clown at Puck Rent-a-Fool. In that capacity, she ran for Mayor of Toronto in the 1974 municipal election under the pseudonym "Rosy Sunrise". She then worked in radio, hosting her first talk show for a station in Brampton, Ontario in 1975. She later joined the CBC as an archivist, and became host of CBC Radio's Variety Tonight in 1981.

She won an ACTRA Award for Best Radio Host or Interviewer at the 13th ACTRA Awards in 1984, for her work on Variety Tonight. She was also nominated, but did not win, at the 12th ACTRA Awards in 1983, and at the 14th ACTRA Awards in 1985.

In 1985, after the cancellation of Variety Tonight she became host of Gabereau, a daily interview show. The show aired in the same time slot as Variety Tonight for its first season. In January 1986 she announced that she would be leaving the show at the end of the season to pursue other interests; she was ultimately convinced to change her mind and remain with the network, although her show moved to a weekly airing on Saturdays and its nightly time slot was taken over by Stan Carew's new Prime Time. It returned to daily airing again in 1988 as an afternoon show.

She was one of the CBC's most popular and beloved hosts until her departure in 1997, when she moved to CTV, for which she hosted a television talk show, The Vicki Gabereau Show, for eight seasons.

Her radio program was replaced in the fall of 1997 by Richardson's Roundup, hosted by Bill Richardson. She published an autobiography, This Won't Hurt a Bit, and a cookbook collecting some of her favourite recipes sent in by her CBC radio listeners.

In 2005, she was named by ACTRA as the recipient of its John Drainie Award for lifetime achievement in Canadian broadcasting.

In 2013, it was announced that a retired Gabereau had partnered with a childhood friend to launch a shoe company called VG Shoes.

She makes regular fundraising appearances on the Knowledge Network and is a three-time ACTRA Award winner for best radio host-interviewer.

She has two children, Morgan Gabereau and Eve Gabereau, a step-daughter and five grandchildren.
