= High Definition (radio program) =

High Definition was a Canadian radio program, which debuted on February 4, 2006, on the CBC Radio One network.

The series, an eight-episode short run series hosted by Don McKellar, examined and analyzed television's role in modern popular culture. It aired in a time slot previously occupied by O'Reilly on Advertising, a program which offered a similar perspective on advertising.
