= Dispatches (radio program) =

Dispatches was a Canadian radio program, which aired on CBC Radio One from 2001 to 2012. The program, which was hosted by Rick MacInnes-Rae, aired documentary reports on international news and feature topics. Its opening music was an excerpt from Mark Knopfler's song "What It Is."

Originally a half-hour program, the program expanded to a one-hour format in April 2007, incorporating some features of CBC Radio's cancelled world music series Global Village.

On April 10, 2012, the CBC announced it would cancel the program due to budget cuts as a result of the 2012 Canadian federal budget.

The last program aired on June 21, 2012 and was repeated June 24.
