= The Roundup (radio program) =

- Running time: 2:00 pm–4:00 pm
- Home station: CBC Radio One
- Hosted by: Bill Richardson (1997–2004); Tetsuro Shigematsu (2004–2005)
- Original release: September 1, 1997 – 2005

The Roundup was a weekday afternoon program on the Radio One network of the Canadian Broadcasting Corporation from 1997 to 2005. Heard weekdays from 2:00 to 4:00 p.m. (2:30 to 4:30 in Newfoundland), the show mixed music with calls and letters from listeners which were often comic in nature, feature interviews, and content previously produced and aired by other radio programs, initially other CBC programs but later including content from other radio networks around the world.

The show was originally hosted by Bill Richardson and called Richardson's Roundup. It was created in 1997 to replace Vicki Gabereau's afternoon show after she left to do a television show with CTV, and premiered on September 1, 1997 from the studios of CBU in Vancouver.

The show also occasionally aired scripted radio dramas. Test Drive, a six-episode drama aired in 2001, starred Gordon Pinsent as Earl Hughes, the owner of an independent AMC dealership whose test drives of vehicles with potential customers inevitably devolved into comedic chaos, while a 2002 drama, Paul Ciufo's On Convoy, centred on servicemen in the Canadian Merchant Navy and aired as part of a special slate of Remembrance Day programming.

Richardson left in 2004 to launch the new weekend series Bunny Watson, and Tetsuro Shigematsu, an occasional guest host, became the new permanent host of The Roundup.

In 2005, the show was cancelled and replaced with Freestyle.

== Sad Goat ==
The show's phone number for song requests and listener commentaries (723 4628) was to be 1 888 RADIO2U, but when they realised how cumbersome that would be to explain, they looked for alternative spellings. Richardson discovered that the number spelled out the phrase "sad goat", and 1-888-SAD-GOAT was born. A goat named Sadie became the symbol for the show and the concept was elaborated on from then on.

In 2003 Richardson published the book Dear Sad Goat, a compilation of listener stories submitted to the program.

== Critical response ==
In 1999, columnist Paula Simons wrote that "Bill Richardson deserves every credit for patching together a program to replace [Gabereau], armed with little but chewing gum, bailing wire, and his own ingenuity. Richardson's Roundup is a pastiche of reruns and previews, woven together by the gossamer strands of Richardson's considerable charm. It's a clever conjuring trick, a recycled remix of snippets, sound bites and segues that fills two hours so pleasantly, you hardly realize how empty it all is. Gabereau's provocative, irreverent interviews made us laugh and think and argue. The Roundup's low-budget fluff is as irrelevant and ephemeral as dandelion down."
