= Johnny Chase: Secret Agent of Space =

Johnny Chase, Secret Agent of Space was a space opera radio serial that was broadcast for two seasons on CBC Radio between 1978 and 1981.

The show was set 700 years in the future, and was created by Royal Canadian Air Farce comedian Don Ferguson along with Henry Sobodka. The show has been described as both a serious space opera and an over-the-top spoof of the genre.

The show's distinctive theme music was by the Canadian progressive-rock band FM.

== Description ==
The main character is a secret agent (voiced by Neil Dainard), who works for Earth Empire. He traverses through space in the Aleph-9, a spaceship run by a talking computer, the insufferably brilliant (and equally arrogant) Dante (voiced by Chris Wiggins). Together they battle a range of enemies of the empire, including pirates, vampires, and the Thorks, an alien race bent on the destruction of Earth Empire. Other regular cast members included Mrs. Mulligan Jones, an "ancient psychic and Head of Empire Security" (voiced by Mary Piri), and Percy (voiced by Louis Negin), who was Johnny's direct boss at Empire Security.

The first season, broadcast during 1978–1979, consisted of individual episodes detailing the life of the principal character and setting the stage for the workings of Earth Empire and its enemies.

In the second season, the sun was destroyed by the Thorks, and Johnny ends up leading a rag-tag fleet of ships to a new home, very much like Battlestar Galactica.

Some known episode names:

- "The Making of A Secret Agent"
- "The Prince in the Womb"
- "Billy The Kidd Space Punk"
- "The Magpies of Thanasa"
- "The Astra File Plot 1.2"
- "The Astra File Plot 2.2"
- "Katilla's Mind Trap"
- "Requiem For A Mercinite"
- "The Pirate Vallesar"
- "Shakespeare Enigma"
- "The Living Crystals"
- "Alpha Mega Threat"
- "Empress In Exile"
- "Mozart Mystery"
- "Doctor Death"
- "The Mirror Demons"
- "The Phantom Troop Ship 1.2"
- "The Phantom Troop Ship 2.2"
- "The Last Human"
- "The Clone Killers"
- "Space Dracula"
- "The Easter Conspiracy"
- "The Power Of Org"
- "The Bowl Of Nothingness"
- "The Thorks Strike Back"
- "The Battle For The Sun"
- "The Vision Of The Green Angel"
- "The Princess and the Troll"
- "More About Hoolago"
- "Deeper Into Lorp Stardom"
- "The Gift Of Sight"
- "Gorzoop's Escape"
- "The Bearinger Of Warf"
- "The Robot Warriors"
- "The Brink Of Heaven"
- "Thraxa Queen Of Death"
- "Percy Springs A Trap"
- "Ogaloo Lends A Hand"
- "Agatherg Pays A Visit"
- "The Mladamite Realm"
- "Sophren The Wise"
- "Revolution"
- "The Paradise Of All Pleasures"
- "The Birth Of The Green Angel"
