= Definitely Not the Opera =

Canadian pop culture radio program and podcast

- Genre: pop culture
- Running time: 1 hour
- Country of origin: Canada
- Language(s): English
- Home station: CBC Radio One
- Starring: Nora Young (1994–2002); Sook-Yin Lee (2002–2016)
- Created by: Bill Smith
- Executive producer(s): Iris Yudai
- Original release: September 1994 – May 14, 2016
- Website: web.archive.org/web/20180301075645/http://www.cbc.ca/radio/dnto

Definitely Not the Opera (or simply DNTO) was a magazine-style radio program focusing on aspects of pop culture and storytelling, that aired on CBC Radio One on Saturday afternoons from 1994 until 2016. The show's running time varied over the years, though it ran for a full hour in its final year. An abridged version of each program is available for download as a weekly podcast, with an abbreviated sister edition called Your DNTO, airing on Tuesday afternoons and featuring listener-submitted content.

DNTO is also syndicated to some public radio stations in the United States.

== History ==
In 1993, the CBC launched Brand X as a Saturday afternoon replacement for Canada Live, which itself was a short-lived successor to Jack Farr's The Radio Show. Brand X also took over the youth and pop culture mandate from the network's recently cancelled Prime Time. Initially airing with a stable of regular contributors but no single host, Brand X premiered on June 26, 1993 and was co-created by André LaRivière and Bill Smith.

After a year under the Brand X title and format, the show was revamped by Bill Smith and became Definitely Not the Opera in September 1994. The new name was chosen because the program aired opposite Saturday Afternoon at the Opera on CBC Stereo. Nora Young, one of Brand X's contributors, was named as the new show's host, and held the position until September 2002, when musician and former MuchMusic VJ Sook-Yin Lee took over.

DNTO varied in length over the course of its run. Initially running four hours, it was reduced to two hours by the late 2000s, then one hour for its final season (2015–2016).

On May 2, 2016, CBC announced that DNTO would be discontinued after 22 seasons. The final episode, recorded before a live audience at CBC Radio's Winnipeg studios and aired on May 14, 2016, included special guests and highlights from the show's 22-year run. Lee continued with the CBC as host of the summer series Sleepover.

== Features ==
When Young was its host, DNTO was a magazine-style show focusing on popular entertainment, containing features on pop-culture phenomena, movie, video and music reviews, as well as music and concert segments, comedy sketches by Elyse Friedman, and biographical features on entertainment and pop culture figures. Contributors during this era included Ross Porter (who sometimes filled in as host), Rex Murphy, Mary Walsh, Laurie Brown and Guy Maddin.

With Lee in the host chair, DNTO would gradually evolve in scope, transitioning by the second half of the 2000s from its former pop culture and entertainment focus to one that emphasized light documentary and storytelling. Each episode's wide-ranging focus would also evolve so that the segments would pertain to a specific aspect of modern life. For example, an episode might have a thematic focus on etiquette, fear, listening, interpersonal conflict, food or small talk. On-location profiles would also be among the episode themes, including a post-Hurricane Katrina visit to New Orleans in 2006 and a 2015 visit to the northern Manitoba community of Pukatawagan. Celebrity and expert interviews would remain, as would the music segments, but they would also focus on the episode's theme rather than being strictly promotional in nature. Remote segments and on-the-street interviews tying to the episode theme would also be included, along with first-person audio essays. A rotating stable of regular contributors – including comedian Candy Palmater, journalist Kaj Hasselriis and CBC Radio personalities Acey Rowe, Jane Farrow and Grant Lawrence – would also contribute their own themed segments.

In part to allow listeners to share their own related stories, a weekday offshoot of DNTO was established. Titled Your DNTO, the show aired on Tuesday afternoons. While the weekday show would sometimes include content repeated from the weekend show, the weekday show's primary emphasis was dedicated to airing stories submitted by listeners, who could record and upload their own contributions for possible broadcast to the DNTO website.
