= Sounds Like Canada =

Canadian radio program

- Genre: talk show
- Country of origin: Canada
- Home station: CBC Radio One
- Hosted by: Shelagh Rogers
- Recording studio: Toronto, Ontario
- Original release: 2002 – 2008

Sounds Like Canada was a Canadian radio program, which aired weekday mornings on CBC Radio One from 2002 to 2008. Until the end of May 2008, the program was hosted by the award-winning broadcaster Shelagh Rogers, and in the summers by a rotating series of guest hosts. The program was broadcast from Vancouver, and aired programming which covered cultural and human interest stories relevant to Canadians. Jian Ghomeshi, Jim Brown, Rick Cluff, Kevin Sylvester, Kathryn Gretsinger and Bill Richardson acted as guest hosts.

The show first aired in 2002, when Radio One management split its former morning program, This Morning, into two new programs: The Current took over the news portion of This Morning's programming, and Sounds Like Canada looked at the impact of the news on people.

Content on the program included conversations with Canadians from all walks of life, people with and without titles. There were interviews with great thinkers such as Malcolm Gladwell and Thomas Homer Dixon, artists, musicians and writers. There were also penetrating series such as "Our Home and Native Land", which examined issues in Aboriginal communities, and "A Cruel Confusion", which took mental illness out of the shadows. It won the 2008 Media Award from the Canadian Mental Health Association.

Sounds Like Canada aired from 10:00 to 11:30 weekday mornings, and was followed by a half-hour information or radio drama series.

On all weekdays except Mondays, one feature from Sounds Like Canada was repeated in the evenings on Nighttime Review. During the summer, the program broadcast with guest hosts as Sounds Like Canada in the Summer, and featured a mix of new and repeated features.

Following Rogers' announcement in the spring of 2008 that she would be leaving the program, the show ended its six-year run in September 2008. Q moved from its former afternoon slot to replace Sounds Like Canada.

== See also ==
- Seven Wonders of Canada
