= New Town Animals =

New Town Animals were a Canadian punk rock band based in Vancouver, British Columbia, best known for their 2001 single "Three Steps Backward".

== History ==
The New Town Animals formed in Vancouver in 1998; band members at the time were Nick "Newtown" Wright on vocals, Jeff "Pop" McCloy and Alex Angel on guitar, Steve "Kicks" Poulin on bass, and Chuck Renaud on drums. Signed to Mint Records, They released their debut 7" single in 2000 before following up with the full-length album Is Your Radio Active? in 2001. Shortly after the album's release, Renaud left the band and was replaced by Bryce Dunn of The Smugglers.

The band toured across Canada with labelmates Operation Makeout to support the album; in March 2002, they performed at Canadian Music Week on a bill that included Royal City, Stars, Constantines, and Buck 65; the show was broadcast live by CBC Radio 2's RadioSonic. Tracks from the album received substantial radio play on campus and community radio, and "Three Steps Backward" entered rotation on MuchMusic.

The band broke up before releasing another album. Poulin went on to play with The Briefs, McCloy, and Dunn joined the Tranzmitors, and Wright later formed the new band The Split-Ups. A 2001 recording of the band performing "Three Steps Backward" on CBC Radio 3 was released on the compilation album Mint Records Presents the CBC Radio 3 Sessions.
