= Mint Records Presents the CBC Radio 3 Sessions =

Compilation album by Various Artists
- Released: 2006 number MRD-098
- Genre: Indie
- Label: Mint

CBC Radio 3 chronology
CBC Radio 3 Sessions, Vol. 1 (2004)	Mint Records Presents the CBC Radio 3 Sessions (2006)	CBC Radio 3 Sessions, Volume III (2007)

Mint Records Presents the CBC Radio 3 Sessions is a compilation album featuring live sessions from Canada's CBC Radio 3 network, as well as some from the 1990s CBC Radio 2 programs Night Lines and RadioSonic (programs which evolved into the current Radio 3).

The album, released in October 2006 on Mint Records, is the second compilation of live sessions from the network, following 2004's CBC Radio 3 Sessions, Vol. 1. The music magazine Exclaim! is also a sponsor of the album.

== Track listing ==
1. Neko Case, "Favorite" (3:31)
2. Pluto, "Failure" (3:10)
3. Immaculate Machine, "Dear Confessor" (2:59)
4. cub, "Your Bed" (1:31)
5. The New Pornographers, "The Body Says No" (3:50)
6. Huevos Rancheros, "Crowchild Trail" (2:34)
7. Novillero, "Habit Over Heart" (3:29)
8. The Smugglers, "B.A.B.E." (1:52)
9. The Organ, "Can You Tell Me" (2:38)
10. The Gay, "Lonely" (3:30)
11. P:ano, "Ghost Pirates" (2:30)
12. Young and Sexy, "Satellite" (3:56)
13. Carolyn Mark, "Chumpville" (3:08)
14. Duotang, "The Hedonists Collide" (2:55)
15. New Town Animals, "Three Steps Backward" (2:35)
