= Barbra Lica =

Canadian jazz singer

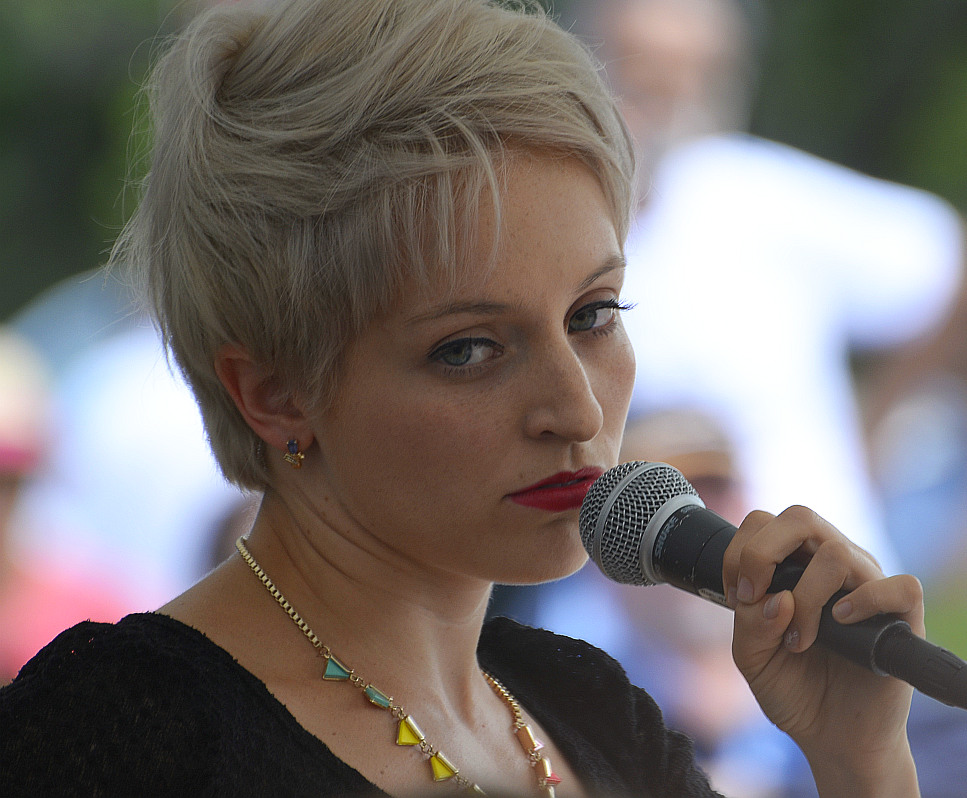

Background information
- Born: Toronto, Ontario, Canada
- Genre: Jazz
- Occupations: Singer, songwriter, arranger
- Instrument: Vocals
- Label: Justin Time
- Website: www.barbralicamusic.com

Barbra Lica is a Canadian jazz singer and songwriter based in Toronto. She was named one of Canada's top upcoming female jazz artists and was the first runner-up in the 2013 Sarah Vaughan International Jazz Competition. Lica received her first Juno Award nomination in 2017 for I'm Still Learning under the category Vocal Jazz Album of the Year.

== Career ==
Barbra Lica was born in Toronto, Ontario, Canada. She grew up in a musical family, and discovered jazz at the age of six. She studied at the University of Toronto, receiving a Bachelor of Music along with a major in Human Biology.

In 2012, Lica released her debut album That's What I Do. It was released with a live-to-air concert broadcast on JAZZ.FM91. The album opened at #1 on iTunes Canada's jazz chart, and was released the following year in Japan by Universal Records. That's What I Do was produced by Juno-winning jazz producer/bassist/recording artist Paul Novotny, and featured instrumentalists Reg Schwager, Kevin Turcotte, Joe Sealy, Robi Botos, Archie Alleyne, Steve Heathcote, Perry White, Brian Dickinson, and Rob Piltch. Novotny and Sealy had first been introduced to Lica when she guest-starred on the duo's acclaimed 2009 album, Songs. The track featuring Lica, "You're Gonna Miss Me," was played on JAZZ.FM91, marking the first time Lica was on the radio.

In November 2013, Barbra competed in and placed first runner-up in the Sarah Vaughan International Jazz Vocal Competition in New Jersey. Judges for the competition included Al Jarreau, Gretchen Parlato, and Janis Siegel of The Manhattan Transfer.

Lica's second full-length album, Kissing You, was first performed in public in December 2014 at Koerner Hall, and was officially released in January 2015. The album was produced in collaboration with Lou Pomanti, and was mixed by Juno-winner Jeff Wolpert, and features Reg Schwager, Kevin Turcotte, Mark Kelso, Marc Rogers, and Kevin Fox.

Lica has performed at numerous venues, including at the Rogers Cup (2010) and Honda Indy (2014), with Bob Dorough at Toronto's Jazz Bistro (2013), at JAZZ.FM91's annual Jazz Lives concert among jazz greats Pat Metheny, Terence Blanchard, and Bill Charlap (2013), as well as a featured performance with Sylvia Tyson and Serena Ryder on CBC's 75th Anniversary Special with host Michael Enright.

Lica has been called one of Canada's Top 5 Female Jazz Singers by CBC Radio 2 host Tim Tamashiro (Tonic). She has also been described as one of Toronto's top 5 up-and-coming jazz artists by blogTO.

On February 7, 2017, Lica's album I'm Still Learning was nominated for a Juno Award in the category Vocal Jazz Album of the Year.

== Discography ==
=== As leader ===
- That's What I Do (Triplet/Universal Jazz Japan), 2012)
- Kissing You (2015)
- Love Songs (2015) (Japan)
- Christmas Present
- Who Knows? (2016) (Japan)
- I'm Still Learning (Justin Time, 2016)
- You're Fine (Justin Time, 2018)

=== As guest ===
- Songs, Joe Sealy (2009)
- Sophisticated Ladies, Peter Appleyard (2012)
