= Fuse (radio program) =

Canadian radio program

Fuse is a Canadian radio program, which aired on CBC Radio One, CBC Radio 2 and CBC Radio 3. Premiering in 2005, each week the program paired two (and occasionally three or more) Canadian musicians for an hour-long concert in which the artists collaborated on a mix of material by all of the involved artists as well as cover songs.

== History ==
Fuse first aired in 2005 as a summer program by the producers of Bandwidth, the network's regional arts and culture program in Ontario. It aired following Vinyl Tap, taking over the final hour of Finkleman's 45s' timeslot.

The show completed its original run in October 2005, and was replaced by the weekend edition of The National Playlist. After National Playlist was cancelled, Fuse rejoined the CBC schedule in the spring of 2006.

The program's original host, Amanda Putz, moved with her husband to Hong Kong in the fall of 2006. She was replaced by former Ontario Today host Alan Neal. Putz returned to the program in September 2007.

The program's pairing of Gord Downie with The Sadies led them to collaborate on the 2014 album And the Conquering Sun.

== Performers ==
- Randy Bachman and Tal Bachman
- Leslie Feist and Kathleen Edwards
- Joel Plaskett and Tom Wilson
- Kiran Ahluwalia and Mighty Popo
- Lynn Miles and Jim Bryson
- Buck 65 and Sarah Slean
- The Golden Dogs and The Golden Seals
- Jenny Whiteley and Stephen Fearing
- Gentleman Reg, Andy Kim and Danny Michel
- Ron Sexsmith and Sam Roberts
- Hawksley Workman and Choclair
- Andy Stochansky and Andrew McPherson
- Colin Linden and Alana Levandoski
- Ridley Bent, Ndidi Onukwulu and Madagascar Slim
- Agnostic Mountain Gospel Choir and Sarah Dugas & Andrina Turenne
- Carolyn Mark and Great Lake Swimmers
- Lily Frost and Hilotrons
- Julie Doiron and The Superfantastics
- Jill Barber, Matthew Barber, Bryden Baird, Jesse Baird and Jay Baird
- Torngat and Patrick Watson
- Andre Ethier and Sandro Perri
- Kids on TV and Ohbijou
- Jim Cuddy and Oh Susanna
- Final Fantasy and Cadence Weapon
- Apostle of Hustle and Tagaq
- Jon-Rae and the River and Anne Lindsay
- Emm Gryner and D.D. Jackson
- Royal Wood and Priya Thomas
- Blackie and the Rodeo Kings and Murray McLauchlan
- Amy Millan and Luke Doucet
- Henri Fabergé and the Adorables and Abdominal
- The Sadies and Gord Downie
