= After Hours (radio show) =

- Genre: Jazz music show
- Running time: 2 hours
- Country of origin: Canada
- Language(s): English
- Home station: CBC Radio 2
- Starring: Ross Porter and later, Andy Sheppard
- Original release: 1993 – March 16, 2007
- Website: After Hours

After Hours was a jazz-oriented program that aired from Monday to Friday from 10:05 p.m.-12 midnight on CBC Radio 2. The show was hosted by Andy Sheppard and originated from CBC Radio 2's Winnipeg studio at CBW-FM. It was created by Ross Porter, Kinsey Posen and Tom Anniko.

After Hours debuted on what was then CBC Stereo in 1993, with Ross Porter as the original host (1993 to 2003) and co-creator of the show. Throughout its run, the show had played a wide variety of songs from jazz performers from Canada, the United States and around the world, ranging from the legends of jazz (including Louis Armstrong, Count Basie, Horace Silver and Canada's own Oscar Peterson and Tommy Banks) to modern stars (like Branford Marsalis, Terence Blanchard, Pat Metheny and Canadian stars Diana Krall and Ingrid Jensen).

The final episode of After Hours aired on March 16, 2007, with Andy Sheppard and various guests reminiscing about the show's history in between selections of favorite songs, ending with sound clips of a number of popular jazz stars identifying the program over the Duke Ellington/Billy Strayhorn song "Chelsea Bridge", which was once a closing theme for the program.

Beginning on March 19, After Hours was replaced by Tonic, a two-hour block of light jazz programming hosted by Katie Malloch (Monday to Friday) and Tim Tamashiro (Saturday and Sunday) from 6 p.m. to 8 p.m. (since moved to 8 p.m. to 10 p.m.) local time, as Radio 2 began a formatting change intended by the Canadian Broadcasting Corporation to increase the amount of jazz, contemporary popular music and indie rock, as well as boost the amount of Canadian content, in Radio 2's schedule.
