= Jazz Beat =

Canadian radio program

Jazz Beat was a Canadian radio program, which aired Sunday evenings at 8 p.m. on CBC Radio 2 and at 11 p.m. on CBC Radio One. Hosted by Katie Malloch, the program profiled contemporary jazz through concerts, recorded music and interviews. Jazz Beat was first broadcast in October, 1983, created by Malloch and producer Alain de Grosbois to feature and record both Canadian and international musicians.

The final episode was broadcast March 18, 2007. Malloch became the weekday host for Tonic, a two-hour jazz show airing nightly from 6 PM to 8 PM on CBC Radio 2.
