= Lana Gay =

Canadian radio personality and music journalist

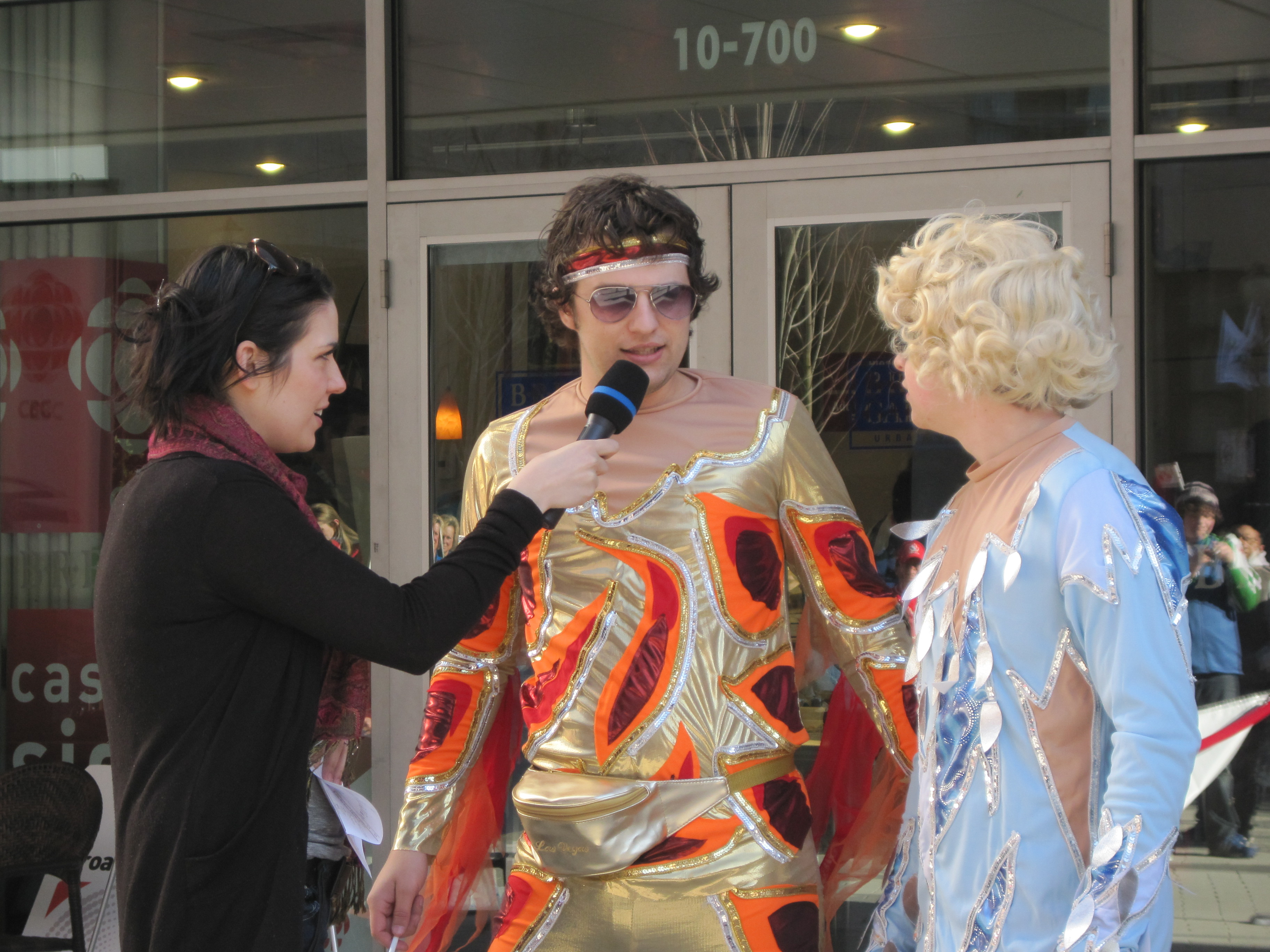
Lana Gay in 2010

Lana Gay is a Canadian radio personality and music journalist. Best known as a longtime host on CBC Radio 3, she is currently heard on Indie 88 in Toronto, Ontario since July 2015. She was also formerly a host on CFNY-FM in Toronto, and indie music director at CFOX in Vancouver, British Columbia.

Originally from Leamington, Ontario, Gay has cited Rosalie Trombley, the longtime program director of radio station CKLW in nearby Windsor, as an important influence on her career.

She temporarily left CBC Radio 3 in December 2011 along with Vish Khanna, and debuted as a host of CBC Music's new hosted rock music stream in February 2012. She returned to Radio 3 in the summer of 2012 to cover a sabbatical by Grant Lawrence, and returned to the network full-time thereafter.

Gay also served on the grand jury for the 2008 Polaris Music Prize.
