= Grant Lawrence =

Canadian musician and broadcaster

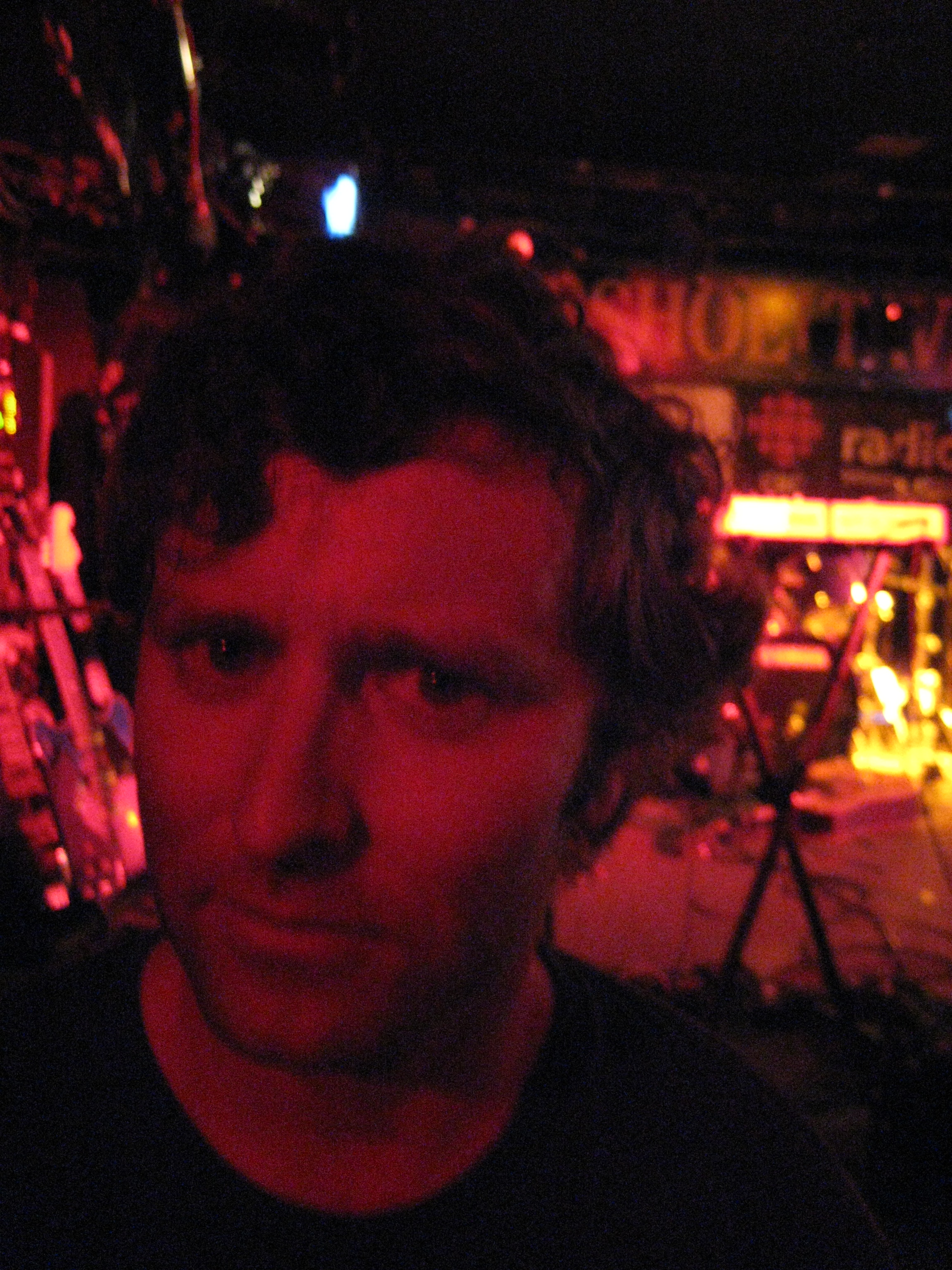
- Lawrence at the 2007 NXNE festival

Background information
- Born: July 30, 1971 (age 55); Vancouver, British Columbia, Canada
- Occupations: Media personality, musician, writer
- Instrument: vocalist
- Years active: 1989–present

Grant Lawrence (born July 30, 1971) is a Canadian broadcaster, musician and bestselling author based in Vancouver, primarily associated with CBC Music and CBC Radio 3. Lawrence was also the vocalist for the indie rock group The Smugglers.

== Work ==
Lawrence began working at the CBC in 1998. In addition to his regular daily shifts on Radio 3, Lawrence was the host of Radio 3's Saturday night program on the CBC Radio 2 network until March 17, 2007, when that program was discontinued, and was also regular host of the service's weekly podcast. Spin magazine dubbed it the best podcast in Canada. The podcast continued for over ten years with Lawrence as host. In 2012 he also hosted the summer series The Wild Side on CBC Radio One, and became the host of the CBC Music Top 20 in 2020.

Lawrence began his association with the CBC in the early to mid 1990s, filing stories about life on tour with the Smugglers for David Wisdom's show Night Lines. When Nightlines ended in 1997, Wisdom and Leora Kornfeld, the former host of RealTime, went on to host the new series RadioSonic. Lawrence initially worked for the show as a researcher, and later became a producer, and became host of RadioSonic in 2001 after Wisdom and Kornfeld left the program.

In the summer of 2013, Lawrence and director Brent Hodge did a cross-country tour called The Beetle Roadtrip Sessions, which was distributed as a web series on CBC Music and other streaming video sites. It followed Lawrence across Canada visiting various musicians and other personalities along the way, including the Darcys, Hollerado, Sam Roberts, Theo Fleury, Hawksley Workman and others. The Beetle Roadtrip Sessions won Best Original Program or Series produced for Digital Media – Non-Fiction at the 2nd Canadian Screen Awards.

Lawrence published his first book, Adventures in Solitude: What Not to Wear to a Nude Potluck and Other Stories from Desolation Sound, in 2010, an immediate bestseller and Lawrence's most popular book to date. A memoir of his visits to the Desolation Sound area of British Columbia, the book was a shortlisted nominee for the 2011 Hilary Weston Writers' Trust Prize for Nonfiction and the 2011 Edna Staebler Award.

Lawrence published his second book, The Lonely End of the Rink: Confessions of a Reluctant Goalie, in 2013. Both books won the BC Book Prize for Book of the Year in their respective years, making Grant Lawrence the first author in the history of the BC Book Prizes to accomplish this feat.

His third book, Dirty Windshields: The Best and the Worst of the Smugglers Tour Diaries, was published in 2017 and won an Independent Publishers Award at a ceremony at the famed Copacabana nightclub in New York City. His fourth book is the children's picture book Bailey the Bat and the Tangled Moose. In 2022, Lawrence published his sequel to his first book, called Return to Solitude, which was a number one bestseller and the highest-selling BC book of that year. In 2024, Lawrence published the children's book adaptation of Adventures in Solitude, called Adventures in Desolation Sound, with illustrator Ginger Ngo. In 2025, Lawrence announced he is working on a new project involving a family of orca whales that frequent Desolation Sound.

== Personal life ==
He is married to singer-songwriter Jill Barber and they have two children.

Lawrence's son plays in the punk rock band Blue Jay Valley.

Lawrence co-founded and currently plays hockey for the Vancouver Flying Vees, an amateur hockey team staffed largely by Canadian musicians.
