= Duotang (band) =

Canadian indie pop duo

- Origin: Winnipeg, Manitoba, Canada
- Genres: Indie rock Pop
- Years active: 1995–2001, 2014-present
- Label: Mint Stomp Records
- Members: Rod Slaughter; Sean Allum
- Website: duotangband.com

Duotang is a Canadian indie pop duo from Winnipeg, composed of Rod Slaughter and Sean Allum.

== History ==
Slaughter and Allum began practicing together in the summer of 1995; their respective bands "Zen Bungalow" and "Bovine" shared a practice space, and the two began staying after practice to craft their own music.

In March 1996, they played a show with the Smugglers, and that led to their signing with Mint Records. On July 16, 1996, they released a 7" entitled The Message.

Their first album, Smash the Ships and Raise the Beams was recorded in Vancouver by Darryl Neudorf, and released on August 29, 1996. Their second album, The Cons & The Pros was released on May 20, 1998. They then toured Canada with fellow locals, The Weakerthans.

After the tour, Duotang was inactive for a time; Slaughter joined Winnipeg mod band Novillero in 1999, while Allum attended Creative Communications studies at Winnipeg's Red River College. The pair came back together to release a third full-length album entitled The Bright Side; it was recorded with Cam Loeppky at Private Ear Recording in Winnipeg, and released in June 2001. In September 2001, they performed in Montreal with The Flashing Lights and The Datsons.

Duotang disbanded soon after the release of The Bright Side. They reunited briefly in 2006 for the Mint Records Christmas Party.

In 2014, after a 13-year hiatus, Slaughter and Allum performed as Duotang at shows in Vancouver and Winnipeg. The band returned to touring in 2015, and released an album called New Occupation on October 14, 2016, on Montreal's Stomp Records.

== Discography ==
=== Albums ===
- Smash the Ships and Raise the Beams (1996)
- The Cons & The Pros (1998)
- The Bright Side (2001)
- New Occupation (2016)

=== Compilations ===
- Team Mint (1996), Mint Records
- It's a Team Mint Xmas Vol. 1 (2000), Mint Records
- Team Mint Volume 2! (2001), Mint Records
- Somebody Needs A Timeout (2002), Campfirecords
- It's a Team Mint Xmas Vol. 2 (2004), Mint Records
- Mint Records Presents the CBC Radio 3 Sessions (2006), Mint Records
- Taking It To Heart (2016), Treeline Recordings

== See also ==
- Music of Canada
- Canadian rock
- List of Canadian musicians
- List of bands from Canada
