= Pedro Costa (disambiguation) =

Pedro Costa (born 1958) is a Portuguese film director.

Pedro Costa may also refer to:

- Pedro Costa (footballer, born 1981), Portuguese footballer
- Pedro Costa (musician), Canadian composer
- Pedro Costa (futsal player) (born 1978), Portuguese futsal player
- Pedro Costa (footballer, born 1991), Portuguese footballer
- Pedro Moura Costa (born 1963), Brazilian businessman
- Pedro Costa (sailor), Portuguese sailor
