= Andy Sheppard (broadcaster) =

Canadian broadcaster and musician (born 1972)

- Born: 1972 (age 53–54); Simcoe, Ontario, Canada
- Occupations: Broadcaster, musician
- Instrument: Guitar
- Website: www.andysheppard.com

Andy Sheppard (born 1972) is a Canadian broadcaster and musician. He was the host of the defunct CBC Radio 2's nightly jazz program After Hours and currently produces and is a regular guest host of the contemporary music program The Signal for CBC Radio 2.

Sheppard was born in Simcoe, Ontario, Canada. A graduate of McGill University's music program, Sheppard is also a guitarist, composer, experimental artist, and songwriter. His song "Until Next Time" was named the winner of the 2006 Colleen Peterson Songwriting Award. His song "And The Bells They Rang" was featured in the viral video Shit Girls Say and his piece "The Things You Want (and The Things You Need)" was featured in a promotional film for the Tony Hawk Ride Channel.

== Discography ==
- Eclectic Guitar (1995)
- Swimming In (1999)
- Andy Sheppard (2006)
- Live at SMASH! (2008)
- Find The Others (2011)
