= Pedro Costa (musician) =

Canadian television composer and music producer

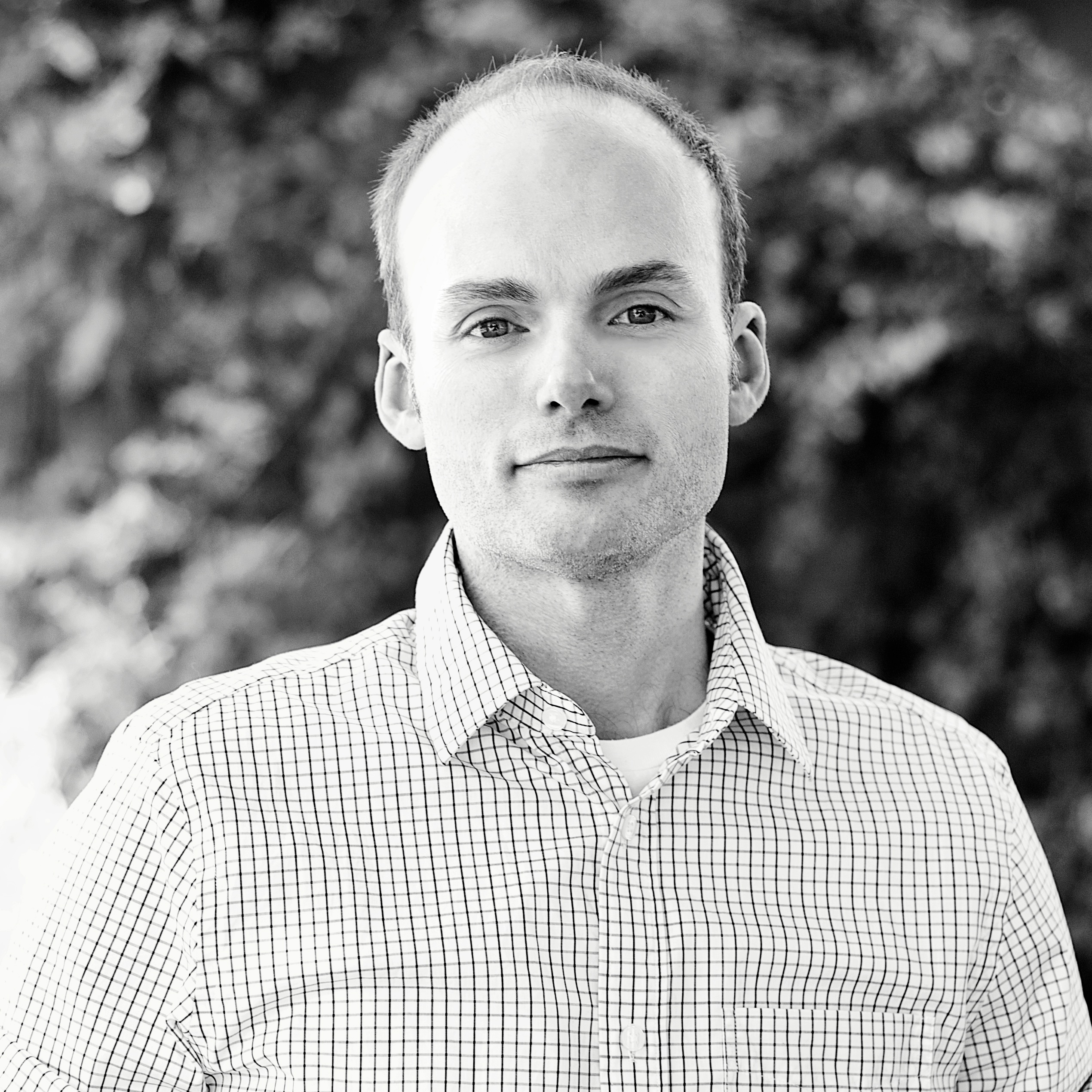

Background information
- Genres: indie rock; indie folk; electronic
- Years active: 2008–present
- Website: pedrocosta.com

Pedro Costa is a Canadian television composer, and music producer. He first achieved notability in Poland where he received national airplay, and had two songs in the Polish singles chart.

== Career ==
=== Projects ===
Driven by his passion for songwriting Pedro's solo recording debut came in 2008 with the Portuguese single "A beira da estrada". This was the followed by his first Alternative Rock EP "The Light".

Recorded in 2009, it has generated Pedro's biggest success to date. Discovered online by Polish radio producer and personality Piotr Baron the song went on to chart in Poland's singles chart. The Light reached a peek position of 11th on 5 May 2009 (see Charts). And was ranked 85th overall for 2009. According to Costa, "The Light" was also played nationally in Portugal by Rádio Renascença.

Some success also came in Costa's native Canada. In 2010 "Fooled Again?" was discovered by CBC radio producer Amanda Putz and featured on CBC Radio 1 show Bandwidth. The track also made the CBC radio 3 track of the day. After several other singles releases and collaborative efforts his first full-length album "Discovery" was released March 2011.

=== Film and TV licensing ===
His first TV licensing deal came from an original rendition of the song, "God’s Gonna Cut You Down" on Discovery Channel's show "Weed Country". In 2017 the critically acclaimed Netflix show 13 Reason Why used Pedro's song "Finding My Wings" on the show's soundtrack.

== Discography ==
=== Solo Releases ===
- Awake in a Dream (2019)
- Made for TV (2015)
- Discovery (2011)
- Pie in the Sky (2010) (EP)
- The Light (2009) (EP)

=== Fetal Pulse ===
- Synthetica (2015) (EP)
- Space (2013)
- Cityscapes (2011)

=== Dove Pilot ===
- Hearts of Summer (2017)
- Dove Pilot (2015)

== Charts ==
Song	Date
"The Light"	2 May 2009
"Can't Get Through"	13 March 2010
