= Litterbug =

Litterbug or Litter bug may refer to:

- One who litters in public places (see also litterbug word history)
- litterbug (band), a Canadian indie rock band
- Litterbug (comics), a Marvel Comics character
- The Litterbug, a 1961 Donald Duck short film
- Giant burrowing cockroach or litter bug, an insect native to Australia
