= Ross Porter =

Ross Porter may refer to:

- Ross Porter (sportscaster) (born 1938), American sportscaster
- Ross Porter (Canadian broadcaster), Canadian broadcasting executive and jazz writer
- Ross Porter (cyclist), British racing cyclist
