= Pluto (Canadian band) =

Canadian alternative rock band

- Origin: Vancouver, British Columbia, Canada
- Genres: Alternative rock
- Years active: 1993–1999
- Labels: Mint, Virgin
- Past members: Rolf Hetherington; Ian Jones; Justin Leigh; John Ounpuu
- Website: myspace.com/plutotheband

Pluto was a Canadian alternative rock band from Vancouver, British Columbia. They were nominated for a 1997 Juno Award. The band consisted of vocalist and guitarist Ian Jones, guitarist Rolf Hetherington, bassist John Ounpuu, and drummer Justin Leigh.

== History ==
Pluto formed in 1993 in Vancouver, British Columbia, Canada. After independently releasing several singles, the band released its debut album, Cool Way to Feel, in 1995 on Mint Records. The band released a four-song EP, Cut and Paste in 1996. The band subsequently signed to Virgin Records. On 25 June 1996, the band released their eponymous album, which featured the hit single "Paste". "Paste" also appeared on the first Big Shiny Tunes compilation album, which was released in late 1996. The band was nominated for "Best New Group" at the 1997 Juno Awards. The band released one more album in 1998 before breaking up in 1999.

In 2006, A live performance of their song "Failure", recorded on CBC Stereo's Night Lines in 1994, was released on the compilation album Mint Records Presents the CBC Radio 3 Sessions.

The band briefly reunited for Mint Records' 20th Anniversary Concert at Vancouver's Waldorf Hotel on 25 November 2011.

== Discography ==
=== Albums ===
- 1995 Cool Way to Feel
- 1996 Pluto
- 1998 Shake Hands with the Future

=== EP's ===
- 1996 Cut and Paste

=== Singles ===
Year	Song	Chart peak		Album
Year	Song	CAN	CAN Alt	Album
1996	"Paste"	42	10	Pluto
1996	"When She Was Happy"	64	12	Pluto
1998	"The Goodbye Girl"	15	—	Shake Hands with the Future
"—" denotes a release that did not chart.

== See also ==
- List of bands from Canada
