= RealTime (radio show) =

- Genre: alternative rock
- Running time: 5 hours
- Country of origin: Canada
- Language: English
- Home station: CBC Radio One
- Starring: Leora Kornfeld
- Produced by: Thomas Hunt
- Executive producer: Bob Ouimet
- Original release: September 10, 1994 – June 28, 1997

RealTime was a Canadian radio show, which aired on Saturday evenings on CBC Stereo from 1994 to 1997. Hosted by Leora Kornfeld, the series was a pop-culture magazine and interview show, and served as the CBC's first major foray into Internet broadcasting by integrating Internet technologies such as e-mail, IRC and audio streaming into its program format.

== Format ==
The show was produced live for eight hours each Saturday night, but aired in a "rolling" format in which individual stations aired only the portions of the program between 7 p.m. and midnight local time. The program's main feature segments were scheduled to air during the time block when it was airing simultaneously across the entire country, with the regionalized blocks devoted primarily to music and interactive listener chat. During its run, it recorded and aired over 140 live concerts of largely independent artists, with an emphasis on Canadian bands The program also sometimes incorporated comedy segments, most notably the short-run comedy series The Chumps Without a Net.

== Web integration ==
Listeners could interact with the show either by Internet or telephone as it aired: asking questions of an interview guest, requesting songs, offering feedback on the show, participating in on-air polls, and so forth. The show was the first in the world to stream a live call-in radio show simultaneously on FM radio and the Internet using RealAudio in 1995.

On at least one occasion, the program staff received advance feedback about the show before it aired, when an Internet user found the planned program logs for the upcoming episode and e-mailed the show to request that they not play a song he hated.

The show had one of the first web sites on CBC, created by Loc Dao. The show's production team included executive producer Robert Ouimet, senior producer Chris Straw, producer Thomas Hunt and technician Loc Dao. Loc became a producer on the show in 1995.

== Ending ==
The last episode of Realtime aired on June 28, 1997. In the fall, Kornfeld and David Wisdom, formerly the host of Night Lines, debuted as cohosts of the new series RadioSonic, which itself later evolved into today's CBC Radio 3.
