= Bandwidth (radio program) =

Bandwidth was a Canadian radio program, which formerly aired on most CBC Radio One stations in Ontario on Saturday afternoons. The program, produced by CBO-FM in Ottawa, was broadcast in all Ontario markets except Toronto, where CBLA-FM airs its own local production, Big City, Small World, in the same time slot. The program also formerly aired in Nunavut, where it was later replaced by The True North Concert Series.

Hosted by Meg Wilcox, the program was an arts and culture magazine which profiles the music scene in the province, including album reviews, interviews with musicians, and live concert performances. Amanda Putz was the program's original host, but took a sabbatical from 2006 to 2009 to work for Radio Television Hong Kong and CBC Radio 3. Later hosts included Alan Neal and Adam Saikaley.

The program's cancellation was announced in April 2014, as part of funding cuts to the CBC. Repeats continued to air in the program's old timeslot until the new program In the Key of C, hosted by Craig Norris from the studios of CBLA-FM-2 in Kitchener, was launched in the fall.

The producers of Bandwidth were also associated with Fuse, a concert series which aired across Canada on all three of CBC's radio networks.

See also CBC Radio One local programming.
