= Danielle Charbonneau =

Canadian radio personality

Danielle Charbonneau is a Canadian radio personality, who has hosted programming on both CBC Radio 2 and Espace musique. She was born in 1953 in Prince Rupert, British Columbia, Canada and grew up in New York City and Ottawa, Ontario, Canada. Her degrees in Music and Comparative Literature are from Indiana University. Danielle has been living in Montreal since 1986.

Charbonneau began working for CBC/Radio-Canada in 1978, for local radio and television in Ottawa. She then moved to Radio-Canada's La Chaîne culturelle (the francophone national public FM radio network, now called Espace musique) in Montreal. In 1998, she became the producer and host of the classical music evening program Music for A While, on the then-CBC Stereo. Her final program was the CBC Radio 2 show Nightstream, which she did for just a few months. She has also been guest host of classical music programmes Stereo Morning (later renamed Music and Company) and In Performance, and has hosted many CBC music competitions.

At the end of the summer of 2007, Ms. Charbonneau retired from the CBC following almost 30 years of service. However, no official announcement via CBC's websites or press release has yet been published.

== Sources ==
CBC.ca - Program Guide - Danielle Charbonneau (unknown personality)

"Danielle, I Love You" (appreciation from an American listener)

CBC Bio from cache

Music for a While
