= Aim Right for the Holes in Their Lives =

Studio album by Novillero
- Released: June 7, 2005
- Recorded: 2005
- Genres: Indie rock, pop
- Length: 44:06
- Label: Mint Records
- Producer: Novillero

Novillero chronology
The Brindleford Follies (2001)	Aim Right for the Holes in Their Lives (2005)	A Little Tradition (2008)

Aim Right for the Holes in Their Lives is the second album from Canadian indie rock group Novillero. It was released on Mint Records in 2005.

== Critical reception ==
Professional ratings
Review scores
Source	Rating
AllMusic	4.5/5 stars

David Bernard of PopMatters said, "The hooks are plentiful, the arrangements are varied, the melodies are memorable and immediate, and the horns are tastefully implemented... With so many highlights, it remains difficult to criticize the more mediocre tracks because they would sound amazing on other releases when sandwiched between other mediocre tracks. An album rich with perfection can have a minor slip-up every once and a while. In this case, I suppose I can excuse those instances." Jason Ankeny of AllMusic said, "This near-perfect debut is most firmly aligned with fellow Vancouver pop dynamos and Mint labelmates the New Pornographers, sharing their knack for whip-smart melodies and ingratiating choruses. Aim Right for the Holes in Their Lives is a classicist pop record in every sense, recalling the halcyon days of AM radio – virtually every song sounds like a forgotten hit from 1975, extolling virtues like buoyancy and grandeur as though they never went out of style."

== Track listing ==
All music written by Novillero, lyrics by Rod Slaughter except "Abbey" and "Insomnia" music and lyrics by Grant Johnson.

1. "Laissez-Faire System" – 3:20
2. "The Hypothesist" – 3:16
3. "The Art of Carrying On" – 3:36
4. "Abbey" – 3:20
5. "Morally Deficient Business" – 3:21
6. "Aim Right for the Holes in Their Lives" – 3:56
7. "Gaining Ground / Losing Sight" – 3:23
8. "Insomnia" – 4:14
9. "Dean" – 3:00
10. "Aptitude" – 4:18
11. "Habit Over Heart" – 3:38
12. "Let's Pull Over Here" – 5:05
