= Litterbug (band) =

litterbug
- Origin: Vancouver, British Columbia, Canada
- Genres: Indie pop
- Years active: 1999–present
- Label: monkey-bar
- Members: Marc Simao; Janie Cranfield
- Past members: Amelia Mori
- Website: litterbug.net

litterbug is a Canadian indie rock band formed in 1999 in Vancouver by Marc Simao and Janie Cranfield.

== Overview ==
Formed in Vancouver in 1999, litterbug has had numerous line up changes, while maintaining its two original members. In 2002 the band released its debut album pablo on its own record label monkey-bar-records gaining positive reviews. A second full-length album kaiser and EP hollis followed in 2004. In 2004 litterbug recorded "oh, you are so beautiful" for a CBC Radio 3 session, which appears on the New Music Canada compilation New Music Canada, Vol. 1. litterbug has appeared on two other CJSR compilations: Ralph Nader Was Here released in 2003, and Get Out of Your Basement released in 2007.

Both Marc and Janie moved the band to Vancouver, British Columbia in late 2005, and in the Fall of 2006, Spencer Rose and Amelia Mori joined the band to work on new material. litterbug released zero hour in 2009. Amelia left for medical school in Australia and Spencer left, both in 2009. Stewart Lampe and Mouki Butt joined the band. Litterbug is working on new material for a followup to zero hour.

== Style ==
Some commentators have compared litterbug's style to artists such as Yo La Tengo, Half Japanese, The Feelies, Danielson Family, and The Velvet Underground. Marc Simao of litterbug also credits punk pioneers like Jonathan Richman and Patti Smith.

Comprising both musical neophytes and veterans since litterbug's inception, band members have contributed to songs using a wide range of instruments.

== Discography ==
=== Albums ===
Year	Title	Label
2016	The Work of Art in the Age of Mechanical Reproduction	monkey-bar-records
2015	The Scent of New Skins	monkey-bar-records
2014	Stapler	monkey-bar-records
2009	Zero Hour	monkey-bar-records
2004	hollis (EP)	monkey-bar-records
2004	kaiser	monkey-bar-records
2002	pablo	monkey-bar-records

=== Compilations ===
Year	Title	Label
2007	Get Out of Your Basement	CJSR Radio
2004	New Music Canada, Vol. 1	CBC Radio 3
2003	Ralph Nader Was Here	CJSR Radio
