= Rolling Home: A Cross Canada Railroad Memoir =

2001 non-fiction memoir

- First edition cover of Canadian release
- Author: Tom Allen
- Subject: Train travel
- Genre: Non-fiction, memoir
- Publisher: Penguin Books
- Publication date: October 2001
- Publication place: Canada
- Media type: Print (Hardcover & Paperback)
- Pages: 304 pp.
- ISBN: 9780670884735

Rolling Home: A Cross Canada Railroad Memoir is a non-fiction memoir, written by Canadian writer Tom Allen, first published in October 2001 by Penguin Books. In the book, the author chronicles his travels across Canada on a train. Allen includes his interviews with passengers, engineers, cooks, and porters. Rolling Home has been called an "evocative cross-country tour of Canada by train," by Staebler award administrator Kathryn Wardropper.

== Awards and honours ==
Rolling Home received the 2002 "Edna Staebler Award for Creative Non-Fiction".

== See also ==
- List of Edna Staebler Award recipients
