= Tim Tamashiro =

- Genres: Jazz
- Occupations: Singer, radio broadcaster, speaker
- Website: www.timtamashiro.ca

Tim Tamashiro is a Canadian jazz singer, radio broadcaster and speaker.

Tim was the host of Tonic, a nightly jazz program on CBC Radio 2 from March 2007 until late June 2017. He became the full-time host of Tonic on April 2, 2012, after the retirement of weekday host Katie Malloch.

== Honours and awards ==
On June 5, 2015 Red Deer College awarded an honorary degree in Interdisciplinary Studies to Tim Tamashiro.
