= CBC Radio 3 Sessions, Volume III =

Compilation album by Various Artists
- Released: 9 October 2007
- Recorded: 2004–2006
- Genre: indie
- Length: 44:15
- Label: MapleMusic
- Producer: James Booth

CBC Radio 3 chronology
Mint Records Presents the CBC Radio 3 Sessions (2006)	CBC Radio 3 Sessions, Volume III (2007)

CBC Radio 3 Sessions, Volume III is a compilation album released 9 October 2007 on MapleMusic. The album compiles tracks from various live sessions recorded between 2004 and 2006 for CBC Radio 3. Most of the sessions were recorded in Studio 2 of the CBC Regional Broadcast Centre Vancouver, though two were recorded at Studio 211 of the Canadian Broadcasting Centre in Toronto.

== Track listing ==
1. Joel Plaskett - "Nowhere With You" (3:02)
2. Amy Millan - "Skinny Boy" (2:52)
3. Bedouin Soundclash - "Stand Alone" (3:34)
4. Destroyer - "The Crossover Song" (5:39)
5. Chad VanGaalen - "Surrounded in Smoke" (3:31)
6. Pink Mountaintops - "Erected" (3:20)
7. You Say Party! We Say Die! - "What's the Hold-up? Where's the Fire?" (1:31)
8. Shout Out Out Out Out - "Forever Indebted" (5:39)
9. Tegan and Sara - "I Know, I Know, I Know" (3:38)
10. Malajube - "La Valérie" (4:49)
11. Tokyo Police Club - "A Lesson in Crime" (2:59)
12. Cuff the Duke - "Blackheart" (5:16)
