= A Little Tradition =

Studio album by Novillero
- Released: September 9, 2008
- Genre: Indie rock-Pop
- Label: Mint Records
- Producers: Cam Loeppky, Shawn Dealey and Novillero

Novillero chronology
Aim Right for the Holes in Their Lives (2005)	A Little Tradition (2008)

A Little Tradition is the third album by Canadian indie pop band Novillero, released September 9, 2008 on Mint Records.

== Critical reception ==
Professional ratings
Review scores
Source	Rating
AllMusic	4/5 stars

Sarah Ferguson of Exclaim! observed, "The solid creativity in the construction of this music is both carefully produced and emotionally rich... Novillero have been compared to artists from the Killers to the Who. A Little Tradition makes clear why. If not the same in musical sound they match those bands with the creativity and integrity found in their music." Mark Deming of AllMusic said, "Novillero have always been a pop group with the insistent attack of a crack rock band, and that hasn't changed on A Little Tradition; what has changed is the band's eager embrace of a wider range of the pop spectrum, and a welcome growth as songwriters that has given them the sort of material that demonstrates just how talented a band they are. Tuneful, intelligent, and well-crafted, A Little Tradition is Novillero's most impressive achievement to date."

== Track listing ==
1. "Life in Parentheses"
2. "A Little Tradition"
3. "Shadowboxing"
4. "Stand Up for Our Side"
5. "Plastic Flag"
6. "Daydreams & Distractions"
7. "Lost Possibilities"
8. "The Prank Note"
9. "Paco Rabanne"
10. "The Printed Word (Sucks for Inflection)"
11. "Daydream Reprise"
12. "Far from Too Far"
13. "Camaraderie or Bust"
