= Adventures in Solitude =

2010 non-fiction book by Grant Lawrence

Adventures in Solitude: What Not to Wear to a Nude Potluck and Other Stories from Desolation Sound
- First edition cover of Canadian release
- Author: Grant Lawrence
- Genre: memoir
- Publisher: Harbour Publishing
- Publication date: October 1, 2010
- Publication place: Canada
- Media type: Print (Hardcover & Paperback)
- Pages: 286 pp.
- ISBN: 9781550175141

Adventures in Solitude: What Not to Wear to a Nude Potluck and Other Stories from Desolation Sound is a non-fiction book by musician and broadcaster Grant Lawrence, first published in October 2010 by Harbour Publishing. In the book, the author chronicles his upbringing, focusing on annual summer vacations spent on a land parcel his father had purchased in the 1970s on British Columbia's Desolation Sound.

== Awards and honours ==
Adventures in Solitude received the Bill Duthie Booksellers' Choice Award in April 2011, for the "best book published in British Columbia in the previous calendar year." The book was also shortlisted for the 2011's Hilary Weston Writers' Trust Prize for Nonfiction and for the 2011 Edna Staebler Award for Creative Non-Fiction.
