= New Music Canada, Vol. 1 =

Compilation album by Various artists
- Released: 2004 number TRCD 3010
- Genre: indie rock, indie pop, hip hop
- Length: 54:20
- Language: English
- Label: CBC

Various artists chronology
New Music Canada, Vol. 1 (2004)	CBC Radio 3 Sessions, Vol. 1 (2004)

New Music Canada, Vol. 1 is a compilation album released in 2004 by CBC Records. This release features songs from New Music Canada (CBC Radio 3).

== Track listing ==
1. Audio Lava, "Leaf" (3:59)
2. Insurgent, "Dissolving Behaviour" (4:45)
3. Danny Dopamine, "Vo Code Her" (4:24)
4. Madrid, "Stereostar" (5:01)
5. Dragon Fli Empire, "Mount Pleasant" (4:17)
6. Butta Babees, "Man ’n Motion" (4:21)
7. Fun 100, "Computer" (2:21)
8. Atlas Strategic, "Jeered by Minor Demon" (2:48)
9. Cripple Creek Fairies, "Greenroom" (1:38)
10. Tigre Benvie, "My Father Moved Through Dooms of Love" (5:09)
11. Litterbug, "Oh You Are So Beautiful" (2:15)
12. Music for Mapmakers, "Don’t Know What You’re Trying To Say" (2:00)
13. White Star Line, "Sniffer’s Row" (2:20)
14. Orange Glass, "How Fast is Too Fast" (2:16)
15. The Paperbacks, "Grey Skies" (2:58)
16. Bucky Quagmire, "Double Feature" (3:06)
