= Boxer the Horse =

Canadian indie rock band

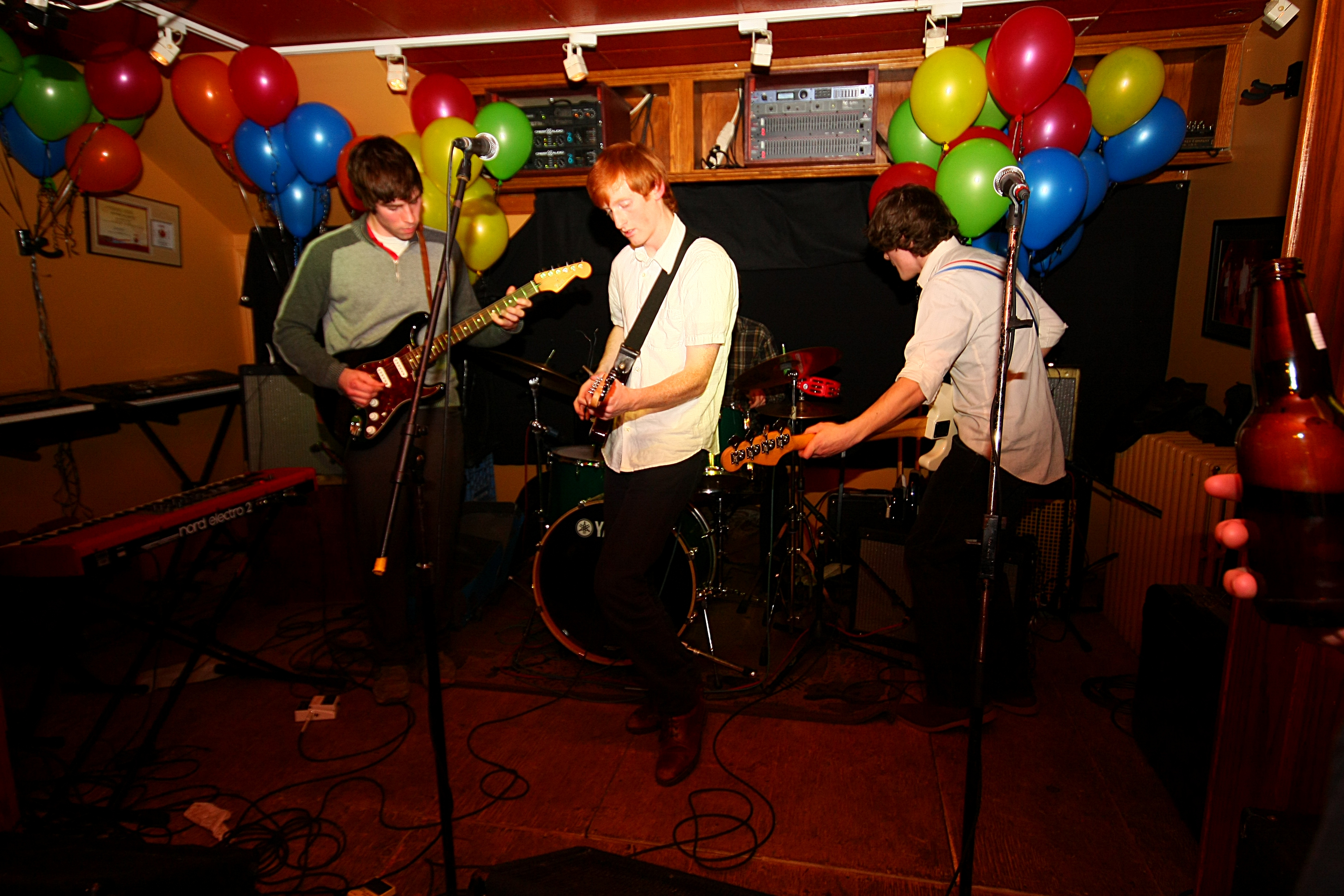
- Boxer the Horse on January 15, 2010

Background information
- Origin: Charlottetown, Prince Edward Island
- Genres: indie rock
- Years active: 2007–2013
- Labels: OBR Records, Collagen Rock Records
- Members: Jeremy Gaudet; Andrew Woods; Isaac Neily; Christian Ledwell; Richard Macleod

Boxer the Horse was an indie rock band from Charlottetown, Prince Edward Island, Canada.

== History ==
Their debut album Would You Please was released in 2010 to high critical acclaim with many reviews comparing the band's sound to Pavement and the Kinks.

In 2010, they were named the best new band in Canada by CBC Radio 3 at the annual Bucky Awards.

The band's second album, French Residency, was released on March 13, 2012.

As of 2021, Christian Ledwell had left the music industry. Andrew Woods is frontman for the band Legal Vertigo. Jeremy Gaudet is a member of the band Kiwi Jr.

== Discography ==
- The Late Show (2008, EP), OBR Records
- Would You Please (2010), Collagen Rock Records
- French Residency (2012), Independent
