= Alexis Mazurin =

Canadian comedian and radio personality

- Born: April 18, 1978; Fort St. John, British Columbia, Canada
- Died: October 20, 2005 (aged 27); Vancouver, British Columbia, Canada
- Occupations: Comedian, radio personality

Alexis Mazurin (April 18, 1978 – October 20, 2005) was a Canadian comedian and radio personality, best known as one of the original hosts of CBC Radio 3.

Born in Fort St. John, British Columbia, Mazurin grew up in Penticton, and later studied journalism at the British Columbia Institute of Technology. He subsequently joined CBC Radio, hosting the series Pass the Mic and Out There before joining CBC Radio 3 in 2003. (At the time, CBC Radio 3 did not exist in its current form as a satellite radio network, but was a program on CBC Radio 2.)

While attending Burning Man in September 2005, Mazurin suffered a massive heart attack. He was rushed to hospital in Reno, where he fell into a coma. He was transferred to Vancouver's St. Paul's Hospital, where he remained in the coma until his death a month later.

Mazurin was also a writer and performer with the Vancouver comedy troupe the Hot Sauce Posse, and was a practitioner of the martial art capoeira.

With CBC Radio 3's launch on satellite radio in December 2005, the network's main studio in Vancouver was named the Alexis Mazurin Studio in his memory. The Vancouver Foundation supports The Alexis Mazurin Award, administered by the British Columbia Institute of Technology (BCIT) in its Broadcast Journalism course: "...the Alexis Mazurin Award supports first year students who demonstrate excellence in audio documentary."
