= Tom Allen (broadcaster) =

Canadian broadcaster (born 1961)

- Born: 1961 (age 64–65); Montreal, Quebec, Canada
- Education: McGill University; Boston University; Yale University
- Occupations: Radio broadcaster; concert host; trombonist; author
- Years active: 1990s–present
- Employers: CBC Music; CBC Radio One
- Spouse: Lori Gemmell
- Website: www.tomtomallen.com

Tom Allen (born 1961) is a Canadian public radio broadcaster, concert host, trombonist and author.

== Early life ==
Allen was born in Montreal, Quebec, and studied music at McGill University, Boston University and Yale University. He lives in Toronto, Ontario, with his wife, the harpist Lori Gemmell, and has hosted classical and popular music programming on CBC Music since the 1990s, including Fresh Air, Weekender, Music and Company, Radio 2 Morning, Shift, About Time and This is My Music.

== Career ==
Allen has regularly filled in on prominent CBC Radio One Current Affairs programs such as This Morning, The Sunday Edition and As It Happens. Allen works as a concert host and a creative consultant for symphony orchestras. He hosted ten seasons of the Toronto Symphony Orchestra's Afterworks series (2009–2019) and ten previous seasons as a regular for concert series with the Kitchener–Waterloo Symphony (2000–2010) and Symphony Nova Scotia. From 2006 to 2009, he also hosted the Detroit Symphony Orchestra's Unmasked series of concerts, working with conductors such as Vladimir Ashkenazy, Hans Graf and Peter Oundjian. With Oundjian he co-created Eight Days in June, a "festival of music and thought" that was described by the Detroit Free Press as a "chaotic success".

Allen has published three books of autobiographical non-fiction: Toe Rubber Blues (1999), Rolling Home (2001) and The Gift of the Game (2005). He received the 2002 Edna Staebler Award for Creative Non-Fiction for Rolling Home, his memoir of a cross-Canada rail journey.

Since 2010, in collaboration with his life partner, harpist Lori Gemmell Allen, he has been creating shows that mix storytelling, history and music. They call these shows "chamber musicals". With consistent support from festivals and companies such as Toronto's Soulpepper Theatre, Ottawa's Chamberfest, Music Niagara, and Stratford Summer Music, these shows often include performers such as soprano Patricia O'Callaghan, cellist, singer and multi-instrumentalist Kevin Fox, violin virtuoso Mark Fewer, and others. Titles include 2012's Bohemians in Brooklyn, a cabaret-style revue based upon the lives of the musicians and writers living in Brooklyn, New York, in the 1940s; The Missing Pages (about Theodore Molt, the only Canadian to meet Ludwig van Beethoven); Being Lost; created with longtime friend and CBC producer Jeff Reilly, about American composer John Cage's misadventures in the woods of northern Saskatchewan in 1965; and, most recently, JS Bach's Long Walk in the Snow, about 20 year-old Johann Sebastian Bach walking 400 kilometres in 1705.
