= The Brindleford Follies =

Studio album by Novillero
- Released: 2001
- Recorded: 2000
- Genre: Indie rock-Pop
- Label: Endearing Records
- Producer: Novillero

Novillero chronology
The Brindleford Follies (2001)	Aim Right for the Holes in Their Lives (2005)

The Brindleford Follies is the first album from Canadian indie rock group Novillero. It was released on Endearing Records in 2001.

== Critical reception ==
Professional ratings
Review scores
Source	Rating
AllMusic	3.5/5 stars

Patrick Lejtenyi of Exclaim! described the album as "spaced-out and weirdly melodic, with a mysterious brass undercurrent and definitely late '60s Kinks influenced" and went on to say, "There is a magical, deeply romantic quality one finds in literature that is translated here onto a compact disc – an ambitious undertaking, carried out with restrained elegance".

== Track listing ==
1. "The Plaguing of an Ex-Comic's Mind" – (Slaughter) – 4:11
2. "Stumble On" – (Slaughter) – 3:50
3. "Vermillion Trade Show" – (Hildebrandt, Slaughter) - 3:33
4. "The Day the Trumpet Player Fell in Love, and Learned to Hate Men" – (Berthiaume) – 2:44
5. "Goodbye Blue Monday" – (Stevens) – 3:42
6. "Ambrose, We Need Advice" – (Slaughter) – 2:30
7. "On a Canvas, Stained" – (Slaughter) – 3:55
8. "World's Eye View" – (Berthiaume) – 3:49
9. "Cat Scan" – (Hildebrandt, Slaughter) – 3:21
10. "The Muse" – (Slaughter) – 3:21
11. "Loose Lips Sink Ships" – (Slaughter, Stevens) – 4:36
12. "The Best You Ever Saw" – (Dempster) – 2:54
