= Hey Major =

Canadian indie rock band

- Also known as: Orange O'Clock (2010-2017)
- Origin: Sherbrooke, Quebec, Canada
- Genres: indie rock, synthpop
- Years active: 2010–present
- Label: Indica Records
- Members: Mickaël Fortin; Raphaël Fortin
- Past members: Anthony Simoneau-Dubuc
- Website: www.heymajormusic.com

Hey Major are a Canadian indie rock band from Sherbrooke, Quebec, consisting of brothers Mickaël and Raphaël Fortin.

The band was first formed in 2010 as a trio under the name Orange O'Clock, with guitarist Anthony Simoneau-Dubuc as the third member. As Orange O'Clock they released the album Crazy Carnival independently in 2014, and won CBC Music's Searchlight competition for unsigned bands in 2015. The following year they were finalists in the Unisong International Song Contest, finishing in second place with their song "Wax 'n Wane".

Orange O'Clock had begun work on their second album, even reaching the stage of releasing the album's first single "Get It On" in early 2017, when Simoneau-Dubuc left the band. The Fortin brothers opted to continue as a duo, changing their name to Hey Major and evolving from Orange O'Clock's rock-based sound toward a more pop-oriented approach defined by Mickaël Fortin's keyboards. As Hey Major they signed to Indica Records, which released the album The Station in 2019.
