= CBC Radio 3 Sessions, Vol. 1 =

Compilation album by Various Artists
- Released: 2004
- Genre: indie music

CBC Radio 3 chronology
| New Music Canada, Vol. 1 (2004) | CBC Radio 3 Sessions, Vol. 1 (2004) | Mint Records Presents the CBC Radio 3 Sessions (2006) |

Professional ratings
Review scores
| Source | Rating |
|---|---|
| Allmusic | 3.5/5 stars |

CBC Radio 3 Sessions, Vol. 1 is a compilation album released in 2004, compiling tracks from live sessions performed on CBC Radio 3.

== Track listing ==
1. Sloan - "Losing California" (3:02)
2. The New Pornographers - "The Fake Headlines" (2:52)
3. Hot Hot Heat - "Le Le Low" (3:08)
4. The Hidden Cameras - "Music is My Boyfriend" (3:18)
5. The Dears - "Expect the Worst/'Cos She's a Tourist" (7:45)
6. Kid Koala - "Drunk Trumpet" (4:02)
7. Manitoba - "Leila" (6:19)
8. BrassMunk - "Push Up" (2:50)
9. The Organ - "A Sudden Death" (2:52)
10. Tricky Woo - "Hot Kitty" (2:47)
11. The Constantines - "Blind Luck" (3:36)
12. Rheostatics - "Harmelodia (Easy to Be With You)" (3:46)
13. The Sadies - "I Tried Not To" (2:10)
14. Buck 65 - "The Anthem" (3:51)
15. John K. Samson - "Utilities" (3:38)
16. Oh Susanna - "King's Road" (3:02)
