= Selling the Sizzle! =

Studio album by the Smugglers
- Released: 1996
- Studio: Sonic Iguana
- Genre: Punk rock
- Label: Mint/Lookout!
- Producer: Mass Giorgini

The Smugglers chronology
| Senor Pantsdown EP (1995) | Selling the Sizzle! (1996) | Buddy Holly Convention EP (1997) |

Selling the Sizzle! is an album by the Canadian band the Smugglers, released in 1996. "Especially You" was the first single.

The band promoted the album by touring with the Mr. T Experience. Selling the Sizzle! sold more than 13,000 copies in its first six months of release.

== Production ==
Recorded in Lafayette, Indiana, the album was produced by Mass Giorgini. "Dusty's Lament" is an instrumental. "Reno Nickel" is about the band's love of gambling.

== Critical reception ==
Professional ratings
Review scores
| Source | Rating |
|---|---|
| AllMusic | 4/5 stars |
| Deseret News | 3.5/4 stars |
| Winnipeg Sun | 3.5/5 stars |

Trouser Press thought that, "with drum-tight playing, soaring fidelity and [Grant] Lawrence as the versatile mouthpiece, the Smugs step out of the slop-rock shadows as a rip-roaring ’60s showband with deliciously memorable party songs that serve equally well as tribute and parody." The Globe and Mail determined that "garage rock soldiers on, cheap, cheerful, sloppy, unpretentious and fun." The Washington Post opined that the songs "depend more on enthusiasm than originality, but there's no shortage of the former."

The Province deemed the album "a platter full of greasy rock 'n' roll junk food and The Smugglers' best so far." The Record concluded that "the cartoonish Nuggets-redux band is lost somewhere in the no- man's-land between camp appeal and real songwriting." The Calgary Herald called Selling the Sizzle! "classic '60s one-zit wonder rock all dressed up in punk attitude." The Deseret News wrote: "Rooted in garage punk-rock, the Smugglers play catchy, if somewhat nasal, two- or three-minute songs that breeze right by."

AllMusic stated that the Smugglers "strike their usual midpoint between the Mr. T Experience and pure '60s beat-rock."

== Track listing ==
| No. | Title | Length |
|---|---|---|
| 1. | "To Serve, Protect and Entertain" |
| 2. | "Especially You" |
| 3. | "Bishy-Bishy!" |
| 4. | "Big Trouble" |
| 5. | "She Ain't No Egyptian" |
| 6. | "Death of a Romantic" |
| 7. | "The Dedication" |
| 8. | "I Need a Vacation" |
| 9. | "The B 'n' L" |
| 10. | "Pick 'Em Up Truck" |
| 11. | "Queasy" |
| 12. | "Bad Guys" |
| 13. | "Dusty's Lament" |
| 14. | "Reno Nickel" |
| 15. | "Barkerville" |
