= The Smugglers (band) =

Canadian indie band

- Origin: Vancouver, British Columbia, Canada
- Genres: Garage rock; pop punk; indie rock
- Years active: 1988–2004 2017–2019
- Labels: PopLlama, Radiation, Nardwuar, Mint, Lookout
- Members: Grant Lawrence; Nick Thomas; David Carswell; Kevin "Beez" Beesley; Graham Watson
- Past members: Paul Preminger; Adam Woodall; Bryce Dunn; Danny Fazio; John Collins

The Smugglers are a Canadian indie rock band from Vancouver, British Columbia. The band consists of vocalist Grant Lawrence, guitarists Nick Thomas and David Carswell, bassist Kevin "Beez" Beesley and drummer Graham Watson. Past members include Paul Preminger (drums, 1988–1991), Adam Woodall (harmonica and guitar, 1988–1990), Bryce Dunn (drums, 1991–1998), Danny Fazio (drums, 1997) and John Collins (bass, 1997).

== History ==
The Smugglers formed in 1988 when Lawrence, Carswell, Thomas, Woodall, and Preminger were students at Vancouver's Hillside Secondary School. They started by playing covers of then popular songs at local events and venues, and went on a short tour to Alberta and Saskatchewan during March Break week. The band's name was suggested by their friend and high school classmate Nardwuar the Human Serviette.

Over the course of their career, the band released material on a variety of record labels, including Nardwuar Records, PopLlama, Radiation, Mint, and Lookout.

In 1996, the Smugglers released their most successful album, Selling the Sizzle!, recorded at Sonic Iguana in Lafayette, Indiana, and produced by Mass Giorgini. It was the Smugglers first full-length release on Lookout Records.

In 1998, the band released a 10th anniversary album of live recordings, Growing Up Smuggler. Soon after, Dunn left the band, and was replaced as drummer by Watson.

In 1999, the band performed in Toronto in support of their album Rosie. A world tour for "Rosie" followed, taking the Smugglers across the USA with the Donnas, and then on their own tours to Japan, Australia, New Zealand, and Europe.

Lawrence was also a frequent contributor to the CBC Radio 2 programs Night Lines and RadioSonic, recording audio diaries of his experiences on tour with the band; he became the host of RadioSonic in 2001.

The band continued performing their high energy live shows, and in 2004 released a CD, Mutiny in Stereo.

After 2004, the band went into hiatus. Lawrence remains with the CBC as a host on CBC Radio, Beesley was a co-owner of Mint Records, and Carswell and Collins are partners in JCDC, a recording studio in Vancouver. Carswell is a current member of Destroyer, and Thomas has gone on to play in similarly minded Vancouver garage-punk bands like the Vicious Cycles and the Tranzmitors.

In 2017, Lawrence published an award-winning memoir, Dirty Windshields, based on the diaries he kept of the band's activities. The Smugglers reformed for a series of reunion shows in Berkeley, Toronto, Ottawa, Seattle, and Vancouver, including one in Saskatoon at the Amigos, where they performed on their first tour.

The Smugglers reunion show in Vancouver in May 2017 was also notably the final live performance of the Muffs. To date, the Smugglers last live performance was in January 2019 at the Seattle Pop Punk Festival, a show with their heroes the Young Fresh Fellows.

== Discography ==
=== Albums ===
- 1991: At Marineland (Nardwuar)
- 1992: Atlanta Whiskey Flats (PopLlama)
- 1993: In the Hall of Fame - All Time Great Golds (PopLlama)
- 1994: Wet Pants Club (Radiation)
- 1996: Selling the Sizzle! (Mint/Lookout)
- 1998: Growing Up Smuggler (Mint/Lookout, live, 10th anniversary)
- 2000: Rosie (Mint/Lookout)
- 2004: Mutiny in Stereo (Mint/Lookout/Screaming Apple)
- 2017: Dirty Windshields - the Soundtrack: the best of the Smugglers (Mint)
- 2022: In the Hall of Fame - All Time Great Golds 30th anniversary double-vinyl reissue (Lava Socks)

=== EPs ===
- 1993: Wet Pants Club (Radiation, mini-LP)
- 1995: Senor Pantsdown (Rock and Roll Inc., EP)
- 1997: Buddy Holly Convention (Mint/Lookout, EP)

=== Singles ===
- 1990: "Up and Down" (Nardwuar, 7-inch)
- 1992: "At Germany" (Screaming Apple, 7-inch)
- 1994: "Gotta Gotta Gotta" (For Monsters, 7-inch, split with Hoods)
- 1994: "Party Party Party Pooper!" (Mint, 7-inch, 5 different covers)
- 1994: "Tattoo Dave" (Top Drawer, 7-inch, split with Bum)
- 1995: "Talkin 'bout You" (Pin Up, 7-inch)
- 1995: "Whiplash!" (1+2)
- 1996: "Summer Games" (Mint/Lookout, split with Hi-Fives)
- 2001: "Smugglers/Mach Pelican" (Corduroy, split 7-inch)
- 2002: "Useless Rocker" (Supersonicrefridge, 7-inch picture disc)

=== Tracks on compilations ===
- 1989: "Revenge", Oh God, My Mom's on Channel Ten!
- 1992: "Shes Got Everything", Clam Chowder and Ice Versus Big Macs and Bombers
- 1995: "Amnesia", 13 Soda Punx (Top Drawer/Munster)
- 1995: "Stop! Look! Listen!", Skookum Chief Powered Teenaged Zit Rock Angst (Nardwuar)
- 1995: "Supercar", R.A.F.R. (RAFR/Flipside)
- 1995: "What Do You Want Me To Do", Oh Canaduh (Lance Rock)
- 1995: "Whatd I Do Wrong", Upsalapalooza (WFMU, live track)
- 1996: "B.A.B.E.", En Guard for Thee (Au Go Go)
- 1996: "Especially You" and "Elite Manilla", Heide Sez (Lookout)
- 1996: "She's A Runaround", Here Comes the Summer: A Tribute to the Undertones (Squaretarget)
- 1996: "To Serve, Protect And Entertain", "She Ain't No Egyptian" and "Barkerville", Team Mint (Mint)
- 1997: "Cans Of Love", You're Only As Good As the Last Thing You Did (Lookout)
- 1997: "Keep On" and "Rock With The Smugglers Tonight!", More Bounce to the Ounce (Lookout)
- 1997: "Rock 'n' Roll Was Never This Fun", All Punk Rods Gearhead magazine (Gearhead/Lookout)
- 2000: "Alan Thicke", My So Called Punk Rock Life (Melted)
- 2000: "Flying Buttress Of Love", Lookout! Freakout (Lookout)
- 2001: "Buddy Holly Convention", "Rosie", "Rock n’ Roll Was Never This Fun", Team Mint 2 (Mint)
- 2003: "Larry Where Are You", Lookout Freakout 3 (Lookout)
- 2006: "B.A.B.E.", Mint Records Presents the CBC Radio 3 Sessions (Mint)
