= Amanda Putz =

Canadian radio personality (born 1975)

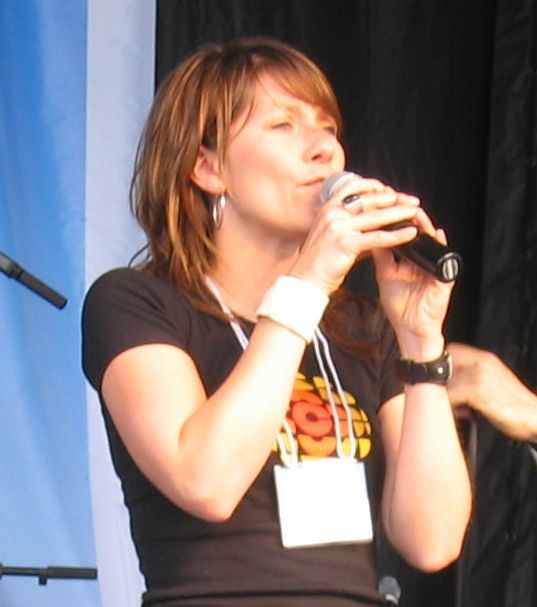
- Amanda Putz at Ottawa Westfest 2006
- Born: March 1975 (age 51)
- Occupation: Radio personality

Amanda C. Putz (born March 1975) is a Canadian radio personality. Formerly the host of Fuse and Bandwidth on CBC Radio One, she moved to Hong Kong in 2006, and guest-hosted various programs on Radio Television Hong Kong's English network, including announcing news for the station.

In April 2007 Putz launched a new program, also called Bandwidth, on RTHK.

As of August 2007, Putz was back in Canada, hosting on CBC Radio 3 over the summer, including two episodes of The R3-30. She also filled-in on CBC Radio One's "Sounds Like Canada." She returned to hosting duties on CBC Radio's Fuse until that show was no longer produced in the fall of 2008. She got a regular slot on Radio 3 as of September 2008.

However, as of January 1, 2009, she was assigned to producing live recorded shows for CBC Radio 2 on a full-time basis; she had been producing such shows part-time while hosting on Radio 3. In fall 2009 she resumed hosting duties on Bandwidth and later Alan Neal became host of All in a Day. As of winter 2012 she is on a maternity leave, and the show is currently hosted by Meg Wilcox.

Her sister in-law is Kathleen Edwards.
