= Priya Thomas =

Canadian artist

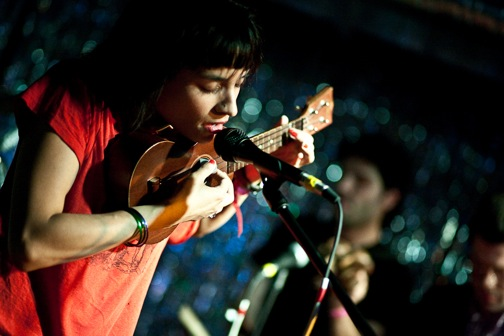
- Priya Thomas, Sled Island Music Festival.

Background information
- Also known as: Iroquois Falls
- Origin: Hamilton, Ontario
- Genre: Indie
- Instruments: Vocals, guitar, piano, violin, drums
- Years active: 1996–present
- Labels: High Scores, IRL, Sunny Lane Records
- Website: priyathomas.com

Priya Thomas is a Canadian artist and scholar whose work spans choreography, musical composition, theatre, and research. She has released music under her own name and under the moniker Iroquois Falls, and her practice brings together performance, music, drama, and writing.

== Early life and education ==
Raised in Montreal, Thomas began studying violin at a young age and started writing songs at eleven. She completed a DEC in Fine Arts before earning a B.A. in Religious Studies from McGill University, where she also pursued Sanskrit. She later obtained an M.A. and Ph.D. from York University.

== Academic career ==
Thomas is an assistant professor in the Department of Dramatic Arts at Brock University. She previously served as an assistant professor at Texas Woman’s University and later worked as research faculty at McMaster University.

== Musical career ==
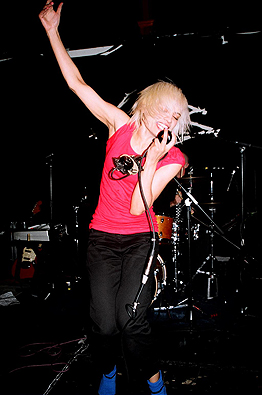
Priya Thomas performing at The Spitz in London

Thomas released her debut album In the Throes of the Microscope in 1996. Her follow-up, Armageddon Weather Channel, was released in October 1997 and featured Ian Ilavsky on guitar. She later released Songs for Car Commercials in 2002 and You and Me Against the World Baby in 2006. In 2008, she released Priya Thomas is Blood Heron (Renovation Tracks). Brad Wheeler of The Globe and Mail described the album as “all guts, bones and jugular veins,” and John Sakamoto of The Toronto Star described Thomas as “seething and perfectly composed.”

In 2012, Thomas released the EP Twice-Born-Once-From-A-Gun under the project name Iroquois Falls, with the release credited to Hi-Scores and dated March 13, 2012. Interview Magazine described the video for The Magician’s Niece as “opening like a diary entry” and as creating “an effect, coupled with the flicker of found footage, [that] is at once trance-like and jarring.” Magnet Magazine described the video for “Hey Annie (Twice Born Out of A Gun)” as a collage of overlapping film strips.

== Dance and theatre ==
Thomas trained as a dancer under Priyamvada Sankar in Montreal. Thomas performed her arangetram in 1983 and continued to study Bharata Natyam with Sankar until 1995, performing regularly in Canada, the US and India. Thomas also studied Carnatic vocal music with Priyamvada Sankar, and studied Sanskrit at McGill University. Thomas has choreographed and performed in contemporary dance pieces, most notably collaborating with Hari Krishnan and Devraj Patnaik, co-founder of Chitralekha Odissi Dance Creations. She has also worked as a choreographer for theatre, dramaturg and theatre director.

== Sources ==
- Wheeler, Brad. Disc of the Week: Priya Thomas is Blood Heron; Renovations Still Raw but the Place Shows Well The Globe and Mail, November 11, 2008.
- Adams, Bill. Priya Thomas is Blood Heron (renovation tracks) Review Ground Control L.A, September 2008.
- Bliss, Karen. Ten Years On Priya Thomas is Still Writing Evocative, Provocative Songs Words and Music Socan, January 2006.
- Berkeley Place. Priya Thomas - Blood Heron Review November 2008.
- Adams, Bill Priya Thomas: The Virtue of Living and Working in the Moment Ground Control Magazine, October 2008.
- Chart Attack Staff September, 2008.
- Lewis, Jason Priya Thomas is Blood Heron FFWD Weekly Calgary, October 23, 2008.
- Guimond, Steve Priya Thomas is Blood Heron CD Review The Hour Montreal, January 2009.
- Sakamoto, John (September 2008). "Priya Thomas Blood Heron, Anti-Hit List". The Toronto Star. Archived from the original on September 29, 2008.
- Morgan, Jeffrey Priya Thomas is Blood Heron, Jeffrey Morgan's Media Blackout The Detroit Metro Times, November 11, 2008.
- McCabe, Daniel. Doubting ThomasElle Magazine interview Elle Magazine, August 2006.
- Saxberg, Lynn. Music Enigma Refuses to Conform: Artist Finding Success Doing Her Own Thing Ottawa Citizen, October 20, 2002.
- Marsolais, Patrick. Au Coeur de la Tempete Le Voir, Montreal. June 5, 1996.
- Lepage, Mark. Don't Call Priya Thomas a Folkie: Montreal Guitarist Writes, Sings with Anger and Urgency The Montreal Gazette, May 1996.
- Yurkiw, Chris. Priya Thomas, Crisis? What Crisis? The Montreal Mirror, May 30, 1996.
- O'Meara, Jamie. Priya Thomas: In the Throes of the Microscope, Top Pick May 30, 1996.
