= Craig Norris =

Canadian rock singer and radio personality

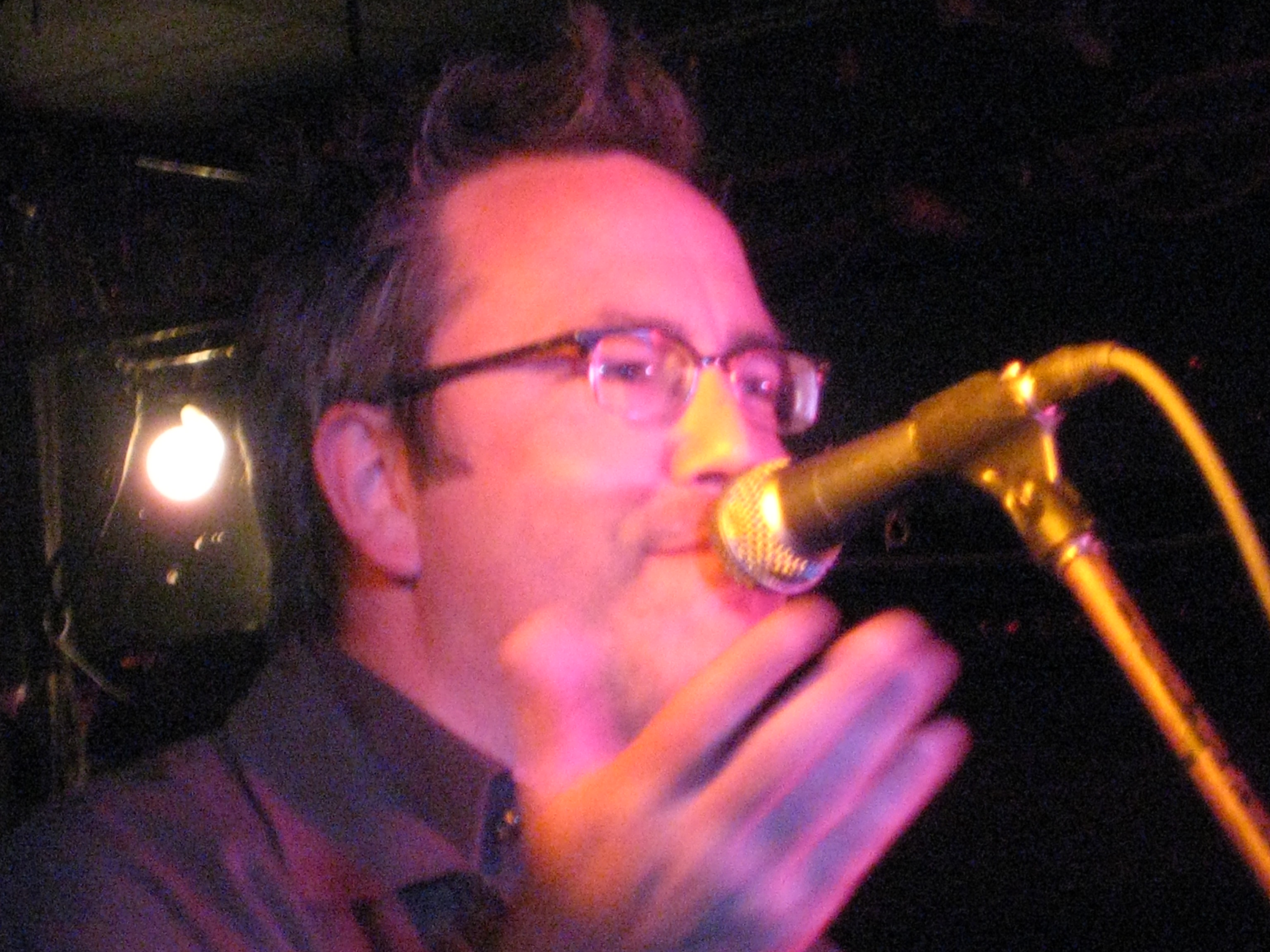
Craig Norris introducing bands at the 2007 NXNE festival

Craig Norris is a Canadian rock singer and radio personality. He is the lead singer for The Kramdens, and is also a host on CBC Radio. Originally heard on CBC Radio 3, including the network's weekly record chart show The R3-30, he was also a host of the CBC Radio One program Laugh Out Loud. In the summer season of 2011 he also hosted Know Your Rights, a show that explored the parameters of human rights in Canada.

In 2013, he became the host of The Morning Edition, CBC Radio One's new local morning program on CBLA-FM-2 in the Kitchener-Waterloo market, launching on March 11, 2013. He also hosts the Ontario-themed weekend music program In the Key of C, which airs provincewide except in the Greater Toronto Area.
