= Capri Everitt =

Canadian singer and children's activist

Capri Aliyah Everitt
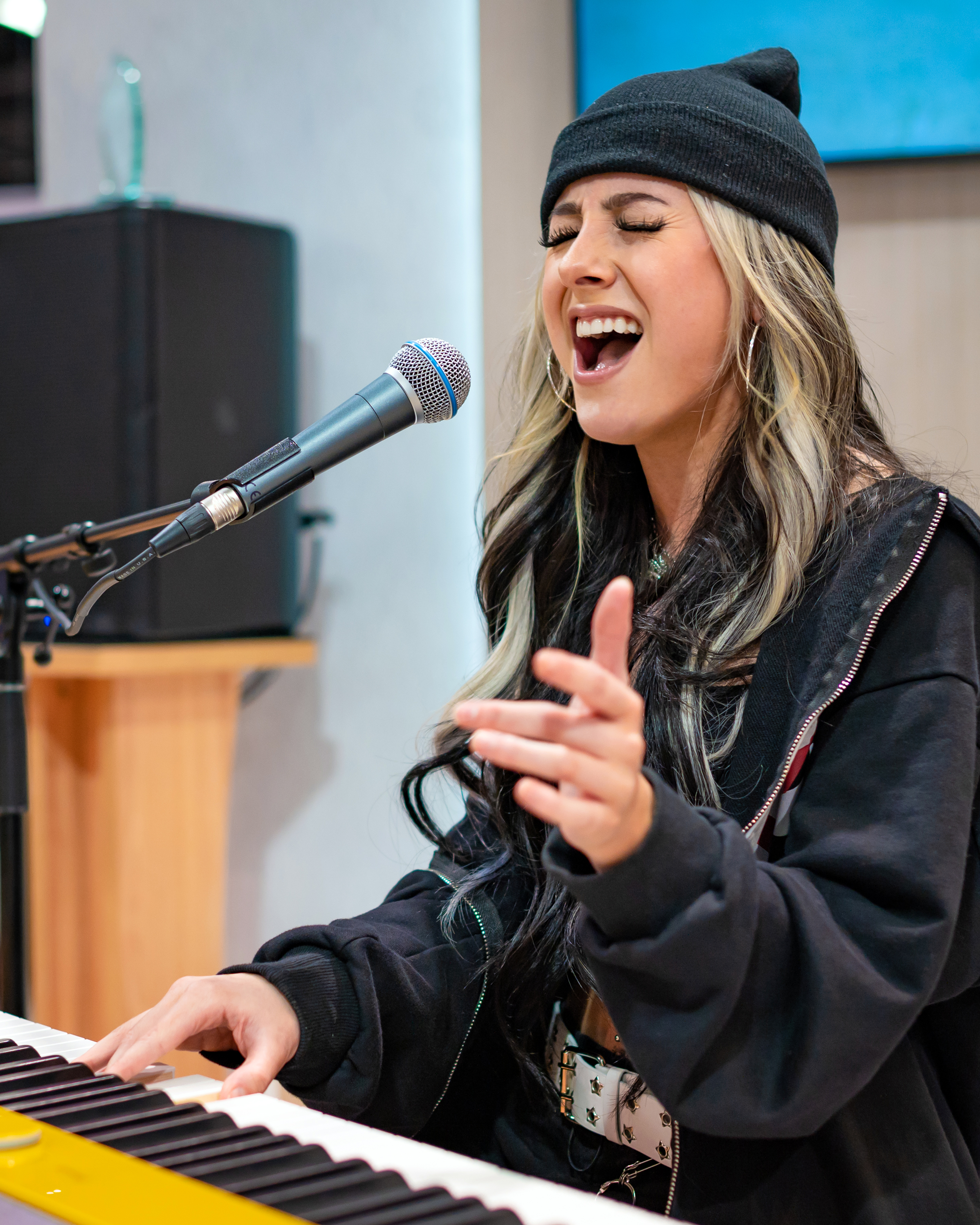
- Photo of Capri Everitt
- Born: August 30, 2004 (age 22)
- Known for: Received a Guinness World Record for "most national anthems sung in their host countries in one year."

Capri Aliyah Everitt (born August 30, 2004) is a Canadian singer and children's activist who is best known for receiving a Guinness World Record for "most national anthems sung in their host countries in one year." She sang the national anthem in 80 countries between 2015 and 2016 (though only 76 counted for the record), and was eleven years old at the end of the tour. Everitt sang each country's national anthem in its own language, singing in 41 languages. The purpose of the tour was to raise money and awareness for orphaned and abandoned children, and all donations were given to SOS Children's Villages. A full-length documentary entitled Around the World in 80 Anthems has been made about the tour.

== Biography ==
Capri Aliyah Everitt was born on August 30, 2004, and raised in Canada and started singing and playing the piano when she was five. Everitt's family were fans of the Guinness Book of World Records and Everitt felt inspired by the book The World Needs Your Kid. Everitt decided she wanted to sing as many anthems around the world as possible to raise money and awareness for orphaned and abandoned children. The plan was to raise money for SOS Children's Villages, which received all donations from the tour. Her parents sold their cars and rented out their home to finance the trip, and also received some funding for plane and train tickets from sponsors like Eurail and Flight Centre. The name of the tour was "Around the World in 80 Anthems" as a play on the name of the novel Around the World in Eighty Days by Jules Verne.

She began by singing in Ottawa, Ontario on November 19, 2015, then travelled to 80 countries within about nine months, singing each country's national anthem in its own language. She sang in 41 languages during the tour. The last stop was on August 12, 2016.

She received a Guinness World Record for "most national anthems sung in their host countries in one year." She then travelled around the world with her family and nine-year-old brother Bowen and sang the national anthem in about 80 countries. Everitt sang the national anthem in 41 languages, as she sang each country's anthem in its native language. Her final stop was in the United States where she performed at a Washington Nationals baseball game. At each stop, she sang the country's national anthem in full and in its native language. Although Everitt sang in 80 countries, only 76 counted for the Guinness record, as the Guinness world record rules stated that only the national anthems of member states of the United Nations would count.

Everitt is a 3 time TEDx speaker/singer, having presented a TED Talk at the largest TEDx event in Asia, TEDx Chilliwack, British Columbia and TEDx Surrey, British Columbia.

Everitt started attending school in Vancouver and has been a speaker at WE Day events in both Vancouver and Winnipeg and she continues to raise money for children. Her family decided to create a book and documentary of the experience to raise more money for SOS Children's Villages. The short film, entitled Anthems: A Journey Around the World, has won five awards and received 10 selections on the international film festival circuit. A feature-length documentary, Around the World in 80 Anthems, was also shown at international festivals receiving four awards and nine selections.

She became the first singer in history to sing all 12 national anthems for an international girls' soccer tournament in Dallas, Texas. The tournament, one of the largest girls' soccer gatherings in North America, featured over 135 teams from around the world and over 4,000 girls. Everitt raised over US$2,000 during the tournament, declining to ask for a personal fee and allowing all of the proceeds to go to her charity of choice, SOS Children's Villages International.

Everitt is also a songwriter and has released 4 singles: "New York in My Mind", "Girl Stand Up", "Push" and "Butterflies".
