= Ross Porter (Canadian broadcaster) =

Canadian broadcaster

Ross Porter C.M. is a Canadian former broadcast executive and music writer.

== Career ==
Porter was a producer and host for CBC Radio 2, where he was associated with programs including Night Lines, Latenight and After Hours. Porter was a pop culture reporter for CBC Television's The National and CBC Newsworld's On the Arts. From 2004 to 2018 he was president and CEO of the Toronto non-profit jazz radio station CJRT-FM (JAZZ.FM91) before stepping down in wake of sexual harassment allegations in 2018.

Porter published a consumer guide to jazz recordings, The Essential Jazz Recordings: 101 CDs, in 2006. He is a two-time winner for Broadcaster of the Year at Canada's National Jazz Awards, in 2002 and 2004. In 2009, the Jazz Journalists Association nominated Porter for the Willis Conover-Marian McPartland Award for Broadcasting.

In June 2014, Porter was made a member of the Order of Canada for his contributions to broadcasting and developing Canadian talent over a forty-year career.

== Controversy ==
In 2018, after a group of employees, past employees, and contractors made allegations of sexual misconduct and workplace harassment against Porter. In a Toronto Star article, he said the allegations against him ranged from "fabrications to distortions," Porter stepped down as President and CEO of JAZZ.FM. The board of directors was overthrown the following year. While donors expressed strong support of the station, some were reportedly "angry" Porter was still employed at JAZZ.FM.
