= Leora Kornfeld =

Leora Kornfeld is a digital media researcher and consultant and former radio personality. She was best known for hosting RealTime on CBC Stereo in the 1990s, which was billed as the first radio program in the world to integrate emerging Internet technologies such as IRC internet chat into its program format.

Kornfeld got her start in radio at CITR-FM, the campus station at Vancouver's University of British Columbia where fellow disc jockeys included Terry McBride, founder of the Nettwerk label, and former Globe and Mail music critic Chris Dafoe. After graduating from UBC she went on to work at CFOX-FM, first as a technical operator during the 2-6 a.m. shift and then as the writer for the syndicated program The Rock Journal. Following her stint at CFOX she ventured into television writing at the CBC. Her first job there was on the short-lived late night teen series Pilot One. She then went on to work on the final season of Switchback and the inaugural season of Streetcents.

Kornfeld made the leap from CBC Television to CBC Radio, starting as a writer/producer and eventually as host of the music magazine program The Beat heard on CBC Radio 1 and Radio 2 in the early 1990s, and continued her hosting duties at CBC on the programs RealTime (1994–1997) and Radiosonic (1997–1999). RealTime was merged in 1997 with David Wisdom's Night Lines into a new program called RadioSonic, and Kornfeld and Wisdom continued as cohosts of RadioSonic until 1999, at which time Kornfeld took a leave from CBC to pursue graduate studies in Media & Communications at Goldsmiths College, University of London. In 2002 Kornfeld founded Ubiquity Interactive, a company that developed early mobile technology such as multimedia museum guides and cell phone applications. The company's mobile museum guide, the VUEguide, was recognized with the Gold Award in the category of History & Culture by the American Alliance of Museums.

From 2008 to 2014 Kornfeld was a researcher at Harvard. Her work there focused on the new models of communication and new business structures enabled by digital, connected networks. Her published work includes cases on digital marketing in the music industry, politics in the age of social media, and how organizations such as Coca-Cola and Ford have pioneered new marketing strategies based on user-generated content. From 2015 to 2016 she was an adjunct faculty member at York University's Schulich School of Business.

In 2018 Kornfeld was commissioned to host the Canada Media Fund's podcast series Now & Next, which debuted on the iTunes charts as one of the country's top technology podcasts.
