= CBC Radio 3 =

Canadian digital radio station

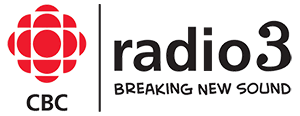
- Canada
- Broadcast area: Canada & Contiguous United States on Sirius XM Satellite Radio

Programming
- Format: Canadian indie music

Ownership
- Owner: Canadian Broadcasting Corporation

History
- Founded: June 2000

CBC Radio 3 is a Canadian digital radio station operated by the Canadian Broadcasting Corporation, which plays a relatively freeform mix of indie rock, indie pop, alternative hip hop, folk, country and electronic music.

The service, which launched in 2005 as a station on Sirius Satellite Radio, evolved out of programming on CBC Radio 2 (now CBC Music), which also simulcasted Radio 3 on Saturday and Sunday nights from December 2005 until March 17, 2007. The station was formerly available online from CBC's website and iTunes Radio, but geographical restrictions were in place to prevent access outside of Canada. The French-language equivalent to Radio 3 was Bande à part.

The network's primary studio was located in the CBC Regional Broadcast Centre in Vancouver, although guest hosts typically hosted from an alternate CBC studio in their home city.

An article on Nerve.com, published in October 2006, called CBC Radio 3 "possibly the world's best radio station".

In October 2022, CBC Radio 3 was dropped from SiriusXM, but remains available as a playlist through CBC Listen.

== History ==
=== Origins and launch (late 1990s–2005) ===
Operated by the Canadian Broadcasting Corporation, Radio 3 had its genesis in a late-1990s proposal to launch a radio network devoted to youth culture, comparable to BBC Radio 1 and Australia's Triple J. The network, which would complement CBC Radio One and CBC Radio 2, would build on existing CBC Radio programming such as Night Lines, Brave New Waves and RealTime. The original plan was codenamed "Clubhouse" and was developed by Susan Englebert, Robert Ouimet, Anton Leo and C. William Smith. The CBC filed an application with the CRTC to launch the network in 1998, but later asked the CRTC to defer consideration of its application.

A precursor to Radio 3 started in 1997, when Nightlines and RealTime were merged into the new program RadioSonic, cohosted by former Nightlines host David Wisdom and former RealTime host Leora Kornfeld.

The current incarnation of Radio 3 was launched in 2000 as a converged webcasting project based in Vancouver, with its own servers and managed by CBC Radio. The team consisted of Susan Englebert, Robert Ouimet, Dave Tonner, Loc Dao, Rob McLaughlin and other partners. CBC Radio 3 initially launched separate sites 120 Seconds, New Music Canada and Just Concerts through a collaboration between CBC Radio, media design company Dotaku Group, and technology company Internet Edge. Each provided audio, video and Flash content as media-on-demand streaming for site users. 120 Seconds was a directory of user and artist-created video and documentary projects, New Music Canada was composed entirely of user-created and uploaded music by Canadian independent pop, rock, electronic and hip hop musicians, and Just Concerts included exclusive recordings of live performances by independent artists, both regular concert performances and Radio 3 studio sessions. The first musician to create an artist profile on the site was rapper Classified. Roots Music Canada was later added to the trio of websites, and offered songs uploaded by country and folk musicians.

In 2001, Grant Lawrence became the host of RadioSonic.

In late 2002, the group, led by Robert Ouimet and Rob McLaughlin, created CBCRadio3.com, a full-screen online magazine which profiled Canadian music, literature and visual arts, accompanied by a set musical playlist which changed with each "issue". The site also served as a portal to the other content sites. The site was recognized internationally, winning three Webby Awards, including People's Voice Award for Best Broadband site, in 2003. The site won over 20 other awards, including the Art Director's Club, New York Festival Awards and Communication Arts Awards, as well as being published in several books. By this time, the site was averaging 5.5 million page views per month.

In 2003, RadioSonic was integrated into the Radio 3 project, and was renamed CBC Radio 3 to reflect the change. With new host Alexis Mazurin, the program featured music and performances from the Radio 3 website.

On June 2, 2005, Radio 3 also launched a weekly podcast, hosted by Grant Lawrence. The hour-long podcast, which has also aired as a program on the satellite radio network, has ranked as the most downloaded Canadian podcast on the Internet, with an estimated 125,000 weekly listeners in 2006.

=== Launch on satellite radio (2005–2007) ===
Satellite radio was approved in Canada by the CRTC on June 18, 2005. Over the next several months, Radio 3 was relaunched as a channel on Sirius Satellite Radio. The main CBC Radio 3 site was shut down for part of 2005 to facilitate the relaunch, although the podcast, the media-on-demand subsites and the Saturday night Radio Two program remained active.

The satellite radio service launched on December 3, 2005, at which time the weekend program on CBC Radio 2 became a live simulcast of the satellite radio service. The main CBC Radio 3 website was relaunched a few days earlier, now featuring a collaborative music blog and an Icecast stream of Canadian music.

Mazurin, the original host of CBC Radio 3 in its radio show format, died in October 2005, and the main Vancouver studio was named the Alexis Mazurin Studio in his memory.

In August 2006, Radio 3 launched its own weekly chart show, The R3-30. Originally hosted by Craig Norris until he left the network to join CBC Radio's new outlet for Kitchener-Waterloo, CBLA-FM-2, in 2013, the program was then taken over by Lana Gay.

On December 25, 2006, CBC Radio 3 held its first annual "Bucky Awards". The Bucky Awards were an awards celebration to promote independent Canadian music, and fans voted on the winners in each category.

The station aired on Sirius 94 from its launch until June 24, 2008, when it moved to Sirius 86 as part of a major realignment of the Sirius lineup.

=== Radio 3 leaves Radio Two (2007) ===
On January 17, 2007, the CBC announced that as part of a major programming realignment on CBC Radio 2, that network would discontinue its Radio 3 simulcast in March of that year. The final simulcast, which aired on March 17, was a retrospective broadcast which included past interviews with William Shatner and John Lydon, visits from past hosts David Wisdom and Leora Kornfeld, phone interviews with Buck 65, Joel Plaskett, Sara Quin and Jim Bryson, and live in-studio performances by John K. Samson and Christine Fellows, as well as listener requests for classic songs from any era in which Radio 3 or its predecessors aired.

The R3-30, which was usually taped in advance and rebroadcast on Radio Two in a later time slot, also aired live from Vancouver that evening and incorporated listener phone calls into the program's usual format.

=== Later changes ===
On May 4, 2011, the channel was again moved as part of a reorganization of Sirius' channel lineup to channel 152. On May 9, 2013 the channel was moved to channel 162 and was also launched on XM.

The channel was removed from SiriusXM effective October 1, 2022.

== Concerts ==
As well as the on-air studio sessions, the network also regularly sponsored public concerts in music venues. The network also broadcast the annual Polaris Music Prize gala.

The Connect the Dots Tour in 2004 featured a different lineup of bands in each city, including p:ano, Ninja High School, The Russian Futurists, Young and Sexy, The Unicorns, The Super Friendz, Lederhosen Lucil, Dragon Fli Empire and controller.controller.

Tour Tournée in the winter of 2006, jointly sponsored by CBC Radio 3 and Bande à part, included bands such as Wintersleep, Two Hours Traffic, Konflit Dramatik, Hexes and Ohs, Great Aunt Ida, Shout Out Out Out Out, Novillero, Les Breastfeeders, SS Cardiacs, Les Dales Hawerchuk, Pony Up! and The Deadly Snakes. Each of the eight locations had a different lineup of predominantly local bands, and at least one francophone band performed at each venue. On October 1, 2006, Radio 3 and Bande à part again jointly sponsored See Vous Play, a show in Toronto featuring Les Breastfeeders, Emily Haines and the Soft Skeleton, Les Trois Accords and The Joel Plaskett Emergency.

Also in October, the network was a sponsor of the Exclaim! Mint Road Show, a cross-Canada tour featuring The New Pornographers, Immaculate Machine and Novillero to celebrate the 15th birthdays of Exclaim!, a Canadian music magazine, and Mint Records, a Vancouver independent record label.

CBC Radio 3 was also the sponsor of a nationwide tour in March and April 2007 featuring The Constantines and Jon-Rae and the River. The tour also featured Shotgun & Jaybird for the Eastern Canada portion of the tour while Ladyhawk toured for the Western Canadian portion of the tour.

On April 27, 2007, CBC Radio 3 and Bande à part jointly presented Quebec Scene, an Ottawa concert featuring The Stills, The Besnard Lakes, Karkwa and Mahjor Bidet.

On June 9, 2007, as a part of the annual NXNE festival, CBC Radio 3 presented a concert in Toronto featuring United Steel Workers of Montreal, Ohbijou, Sebastien Grainger et Les Montagnes, You Say Party, In-Flight Safety and Two Hours Traffic.

In 2008, the network sponsored and broadcast several live shows at the South by Southwest festival in Austin, Texas, including performances by Basia Bulat, The Constantines, The Most Serene Republic, The Stills, Shout Out Louds, Christine Fellows, Grand Analog and Hot Springs.

The network's live broadcast from the 2009 NXNE festival featured Woodpigeon, DD/MM/YYYY, Ruby Coast, Jason Collett, Hot Panda and The Lovely Feathers.

In 2011, they sponsored Victoria's Rifflandia Music Festival Side Stage at Royal Athletic Park, featuring Jon Middleton of Jon and Roy, Besnard Lakes, Jakarta, Hollerado, and USS.

== Multimedia activities ==
=== Webcast ===
CBC Radio 3 had a stream on Icecast which ran from 2005 to 2009; unlike the satellite radio broadcast, the stream was programmed separately. The webstream initially consisted exclusively of music with the occasional identification break, but on September 14, 2007 it was relaunched with hosts and feature content, similar to but still programmed separately from the satellite radio station. Due to funding cuts, in June 2009, the two services were merged; the webstream became a straight simulcast of the satellite radio channel.

Prior to the merger, the two services had slightly different programming strategies – the satellite radio station aired a music mix of 85 per cent Canadian and 15 per cent international, while the web service's mix was 100 per cent Canadian. With the merger of the two services, the station announced that the program mix would be 100 per cent Canadian music on both platforms, although exceptions will be permitted for international music with some Canadian character – such as international artists covering Canadian songs, collaborations between Canadian and non-Canadian artists, international artists appearing on the bill with Canadian artists when the network is airing a live concert, or "honourary [sic] Canadian" artists such as Neko Case and Rose Melberg.

In February 2009, CBC Radio 3 participated with Exclaim! and aux.tv to launch X3, a new collaborative cross-promotional platform which sees all three outlets air feature content spotlighting a particular "Artist of the Month". X3 artists of the month have included K'naan, Malajube, Thunderheist, Japandroids, Apostle of Hustle, The Rural Alberta Advantage, Owen Pallett, and Jenn Grant.

In addition to the service's conventional radio programming, any song in the network's music library was able to be streamed on demand from the artist's profile page on the site. In May 2011, Joel Plaskett became the first artist in the network's history to reach one million on-demand plays.

In 2012, CBC Radio 3 was integrated into the new CBC Music service.

=== Podcast ===
Unlike Bande à part, which produced a number of special short run podcasts in addition to its regular weekly music podcast, Radio 3 only produced its main music podcast through 2006.

As a result of the Radio Two schedule changes, on February 26, 2007 CBC Radio 3 created several new podcasts to complement the original CBC Radio 3 podcast, including a daily New Music Canada Track of the Day and an hour-long weekly R3-30 podcast.

As well, the network also launched a new internet streaming program titled CBC Radio 3 Sessions, which featured live performances by artists at the CBC Radio 3 studio. The Sessions also aired as a program on Sirius 86. As of September 12, 2007, the Sessions program also appeared in podcast format. Sessions concerts have also aired on the CBC's cable television service bold.

Notably, all Radio 3 podcasts were available in Ogg (Vorbis), a freely-licensed audio format, in addition to the more conventional mp3 format.

=== Video ===
On April 20, 2007, as part of CBC Radio 3's 100th podcast, a weekly video podcast was introduced. The new video-based podcast, R3TV, revolved around the personalities at CBC Radio 3 and featured a particular artist each week, who provided commentary for the podcast and had their music videos featured in the show. R3TV was also available as a channel on Internet television services such as Joost, YouTube and Miro Media Player.

In 2011, CBC Radio 3 sponsored its first documentary movie, Winning America, about Canadian band Said the Whale. The movie was directed by Brent Hodge and Thomas Buchan, and produced by Jon Siddall, Brent Hodge and Sheila Peacock. It first aired on July 23, 2011 on CBC Television in British Columbia, and then nationally on April 2, 2012.

After the success of the first film, Radio 3 decided to do a second documentary movie called What Happens Next? about Canadian musician Dan Mangan. This movie was produced and directed by Brent Hodge and Jon Siddall. It aired on CBC on August 25, 2012 in BC, and then again nationally on October 20, 2012.

Radio 3's next foray into video was in 2013, with the web series The Beetle Roadtrip Sessions. It followed host Grant Lawrence across Canada visiting various musicians and other personalities along the way, including The Darcys, Hollerado, Sam Roberts, Theo Fleury, Hawksley Workman and others. It was also directed by Brent Hodge. The Beetle Roadtrip Sessions won the award for Best Original Program or Series produced for Digital Media – Non-Fiction at the 2nd Canadian Screen Awards.

== Personalities ==
As of March 30, 2015, the service no longer featured live hosting, although prerecorded feature segments were still heard as interstitials. Grant Lawrence remained an employee of the service, hosting podcasts as well as voicing the prerecorded segments; he remains associated with CBC Music in other roles as of 2026.

Past hosts heard on the network included Lana Gay, Tariq Hussain, Amanda Putz, Craig Norris, Alexis Mazurin, Lauren Burrows, Pete Morey, Lisa Christiansen, Raina Douris, Dave Shumka, Emma Godmere, Vish Khanna and Talia Schlanger. Canadian musicians and other media personalities have also sometimes appeared as guest hosts, including Joel Plaskett, Carolyn Mark, Buck 65, Nirmala Basnayake, Hannah Sung, Brent Bambury, Graham Wright, Alanna Stuart and Nardwuar the Human Serviette. Some personalities associated with the sister service Bande à part also appeared on the network as reporters or correspondents covering Quebec's music scene.

== Bucky Awards ==
From 2006 to 2013, CBC Radio 3 presented the annual Bucky Awards, which honour Canadian indie pop and rock music. The awards, determined by listener vote, include such non-traditional categories as "most Canadian tune" and "sexiest musician." The awards were created after Lawrence made comments on the air criticizing the Juno Awards for overlooking Arcade Fire in their nominations, and a listener suggested in response that Radio 3 should create its own awards.

In 2014, the Bucky Awards were merged into the expanded CBC Music Awards.

Year	Best Song	Sexiest Artist	Top Video	Lifetime Achievement	Most Canadian Song	Best New Band Name	Best Vocals	Best Live Act	Best Lyrics	Best Reason to Learn French	Best New Artist
2007	Two Hours Traffic, "Backseat Sweetheart"					Said the Whale	Tokyo Police Club, "Your English Is Good"		The Weakerthans, "Civil Twilight"	We Are Wolves, "Magique"	
2008	Matt Mays & El Torpedo, "Tall Trees"	Laura Barrett	Shad, "The Old Prince Still Lives at Home"	Teenage Head	Jason Collett, "Charlyn, Angel of Kensington"	Library Voices	Mother Mother, "Body of Years"	Holy Fuck	Stars, "14 Forever"	Karkwa, "Oublie pas"	Plants and Animals
2009	Dan Mangan, "Robots"	Cœur de pirate	Hey Rosetta!, "Red Song"	Sloan	Said the Whale, "Emerald Lake, AB"	Gregory Pepper and His Problems	Dan Mangan, "Robots"	Mother Mother	Joel Plaskett, "Through & Through & Through"	Cœur de pirate, "Comme des enfants"	Hannah Georgas, "The Beat Stuff"
2010	Arcade Fire, "Suburbs"	Maylee Todd	Hollerado, "Americanarama"	Julie Doiron	Aidan Knight, "Jasper"	Paperplanes and Dragonboats	Sarah Harmer	Dan Mangan	Arcade Fire, "Ready to Start"	Karkwa	Boxer the Horse
2011	Dan Mangan, "Rows of Houses"	Dan Mangan		Ian Blurton	Elliott Brood, "Northern Air"	Oh No Yoko	Austra, "Lose It"	Arkells	Hey Rosetta! "Welcome"	Coeur de Pirate, "Adieu"	Braids
2012	Joel Plaskett, "Lightning Bolt"	Jaycelyn Brown (of Said the Whale)	Said the Whale, "We Are 1980"	Nardwuar			Hannah Georgas, "Robotic"	Mother Mother		Bernard Adamus, "Entre ici pis chez vous"	The Elwins
2013	Said the Whale, "I Love You"	The Darcys, "The River"	Hollerado, "So It Goes"	Joel Plaskett	Shad, "Fam Jam (Fe Sum Immigrins)"			PUP			PUP

== Albums ==
Several compilation albums featuring CBC Radio 3 artists and live performances have also been released:

- New Music Canada, Vol. 1 (2004)
- CBC Radio 3 Sessions, Vol. 1 (2004)
- Mint Records Presents the CBC Radio 3 Sessions (2006)
- CBC Radio 3 Sessions, Volume III (2007)

== See also ==
- The Verge, a similar network on the XM Satellite Radio platform
- Triple J from the Australian Broadcasting Corporation (ABC)
- BBC 6 Music
- BBC Radio 1
- Le Mouv'
- MDR Sputnik from the German regional public broadcaster MDR
- FM4 from the Austrian national public broadcaster ORF
