= Pedro Costa (footballer, born 1991) =

Brazilian footballer

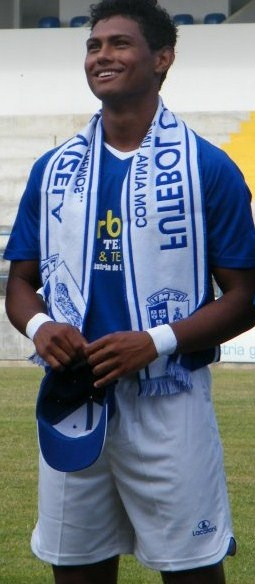

Personal information
- Full name: Pedro Henrique Estumano da Costa
- Date of birth: 24 October 1991 (age 35)
- Place of birth: Fortaleza, Brazil
- Height: 1.84 m (6 ft 1/2 in)
- Position: Forward

Team information
- Current team: CA Molelos
- Number: 77

Youth career
- –2007: Internacional
- 2008–2009: Ceará
- 2009–2010: Académica

Senior career*
Years	Team	Apps	(Gls)
2010	Pampilhosa	12	(0)
2011	Académico Viseu	14	(0)
2011	Sertanense	4	(0)
2012	Tondela	5	(0)
2012–2013	Vizela	28	(2)
2013–2015	Tourizense	32	(3)
2016–2017	Lusitano FCV	10	(3)
2017	Mortágua	10	(1)
2017–2018	Kremser SC	22	(11)
2018–2019	Floridsdorfer AC	8	(1)
2020	SV Waidhofen/Thaya	1	(1)
2020	Krško	2	(0)
2020–	CA Molelos	3	(3)
- * Club domestic league appearances and goals as of 14:17, 23 January 2021 (UTC)

Pedro Henrique Estumano da Costa (born 24 October 1991), known simply as Pedro Costa, is a Brazilian footballer who plays as a forward for Portuguese club Clube Atletico Molelos.

== Career statistics ==
=== Club ===
As of 4 April 2019.}

Club	Season	League			Cup		Other		Total	
Club	Season	Division	Apps	Goals	Apps	Goals	Apps	Goals	Apps	Goals
Pampilhosa	2010–11	Segunda Divisão	12	0	1 (Note: Appearances in the Taça de Portugal)	0	0	0	13	0
Académico Viseu	2010–11	Terceira Divisão	14	0	0	0	0	0	14	0
Sertanense	2011–12	Segunda Divisão	4	0	0	0	0	0	4	0
Tondela	2011–12	Segunda Divisão	5	0	0	0	0	0	5	0
Vizela	2012–13	Segunda Divisão	28	2	2	0	0	0	30	2
Tourizense	2013–14	Campeonato Nacional de Seniores	22	3	0	0	0	0	22	3
Tourizense	2014–15	Campeonato Nacional de Seniores	10	0	1	0	0	0	11	0
Tourizense	Total		32	3	1	0	0	0	33	3
Lusitano	2016–17	Campeonato de Portugal	10	3	1	0	0	0	11	3
Mortágua	2016–17	Campeonato de Portugal	10	1	0	0	0	0	10	1
Kremser SC	2017–18	1. Niederösterreichische Landesliga	22	11	0	0	0	0	22	11
Floridsdorfer AC	2018–19	2. Liga	6	1	0	0	0	0	6	1
Career total			143	21	5	0	0	0	148	21
