= Night Lines =

Canadian radio series (1984-97)

Night Lines was a Canadian radio series, which aired on CBC Stereo from 1984 to 1997. The show, which aired on Friday and Saturday nights, profiled independent and alternative music. It was a weekend companion to the network's weekday overnight show Brave New Waves, and aspired to revive the freeform style and creative experimentation associated with rock radio stations in the 1960s and 1970s.

The show's original host was Ron Robinson. Ralph Benmergui succeeded him, and was in turn followed by David Wisdom, who hosted the program from 1987 until the end of its run.

During the early years with hosts Robinson and Benmergui the show was produced from CBC Winnipeg by Ross Porter. When David Wisdom took over the hosting duties in 1987, the show moved to CBC Vancouver and was produced by Susan Englebert.

== Features ==
Regular features of the show during Wisdom's tenure included:

- Ten Singles in Alphabetical Order. After host David Wisdom alphabetized his mammoth 7" vinyl 45 rpm singles collection by artist, he set aside time each weekend to play one single each by ten consecutive alphabetized artists, starting at "A" and continuing until he reached the end of his collection in the "Z"s (approximately nine years later).
- Listener requests via answering machine. Night Lines listeners could call up an answering machine in CBC's Vancouver studios and, after answering a "skill-testing question" (by rule, something open-ended and usually bordering on philosophical, such as "What do you want to be when you grow up?"), request a song for Wisdom to play during the following weekend's shows. Regular callers to the request line became part of the show's fabric. Some consistent callers included Vicki from Surrey (who later moved and became Vicki from Vancouver), Gilbert from Transcona (who used a mock-Gilbert Gottfried voice on the answering machine), Norm from Richmond, Rocky from Thunder Bay, Milton the Cabbie, Joanna from Hamilton, Sonya from Port Lambton, Ontario, Sean from Brandon, Manitoba, and Lori from Southfield, Michigan (USA).
- Soundbite Sensation Contests. Once each year, Wisdom would create a 6-to-8 minute audio collage containing bits of 50-100 different songs, and challenge listeners to identify the songs found within, with prizes (usually Night Lines T-shirts) going to the top entries. The collages usually had a unifying theme, among them guitar riffs, beginnings of songs, and celebrity names sung in song lyrics.
- The Hour of Power, in which control of the airwaves was turned over to an audience member for one hour each weekend. When this feature started, listeners would send in scripts containing text for Wisdom to read on-air and lists of songs to play in-between the spoken text. As time went on, more and more Hours of Power were performed live in-studio by listeners, musicians, friends of David Wisdom's, etc.

Grant Lawrence, now one of the hosts on CBC Radio 3, began his association with the CBC as a contributor to Night Lines, calling the show to share stories about life on tour with his band The Smugglers.

== Cancellation ==
Night Lines ended on August 31, 1997. The show's final episode featured an in-studio performance by Rheostatics. Rheostatics subsequently released that performance on CD as The Nightlines Sessions. Wisdom went on to cohost the new series RadioSonic with Leora Kornfeld. RadioSonic eventually evolved into today's CBC Radio 3.

Some individual tracks from Night Lines sessions by other bands, including Pluto, cub, Huevos Rancheros and The Smugglers, were released in 2006 on the compilation album Mint Records Presents the CBC Radio 3 Sessions.
