= Music and Company =

Former CBC Radio Program

Music and Company was a classical music program that aired from 6:00 am to 9:00 am on weekdays from CBC Radio 2. It was discontinued in September 2008.

== The Host ==
Tom Allen was the host of Music and Company since 1998. He is an accomplished trombonist and writer. He hosted the CBC Radio 2 Weekender show for two years (1991-1992) and also hosted the Fresh Air show.

== Cage Match ==
Every week Tom Allen hosted a "cage match". Tom chose two pieces of classical music and had a competition between the two. The piece with the most votes from listeners won.
