= Katie Malloch =

Canadian broadcaster

Katie Malloch is a Canadian broadcaster who previously hosted the series Tonic, a nightly jazz program on CBC Radio 2. She was co-creator and host of Jazz Beat which aired on CBC radio from 1983 to March 2007. A graduate of McGill University, Malloch began freelancing for the CBC in 1972, and became a staff announcer in 1975. On January 9, 2012, Malloch announced on CBC Radio Montreal's Daybreak that she would be retiring from the CBC after 37 years. She retired at the end of March 2012.

In the early '80s, she co-hosted (with Wayne Grigsby) several seasons of the CBC Montreal television production Steppin' Out, a weekly newsmagazine focused on the city's cultural and entertainment scene.

Malloch is married to the documentary filmmaker Paul Cowan.
