= Tonic (radio program) =

- Genre: Jazz music show
- Running time: 2 hours
- Country of origin: Canada
- Language(s): English
- Home station: CBC Radio 2
- Starring: Tim Tamashiro
- Original release: March 19, 2007 – September 2, 2017
- Website: Tonic with Katie Malloch; Tonic with Tim Tamashiro

Tonic was a Canadian radio program, which debuted on March 19, 2007 on CBC Radio 2.

It played a blend of jazz music with Latin jazz, soul, R&B and world groove, and aired from 8 p.m. to 10 p.m. Mondays through Saturdays. The program was originally hosted by Katie Malloch weekdays from Montreal and Tim Tamashiro on weekends from Calgary; after Malloch's retirement from the CBC in early 2012, Tamashiro was the sole host until his final show on June 30, 2017. For the summer of 2017, the show was hosted by 5 different Canadian female jazz artists.

It originally aired from 6 p.m. to 8 p.m. nightly. The change occurred on June 29, 2009 when it switched places with Canada Live, which had previously followed Tonic in the 8 p.m. to 10 p.m. slot. The program also formerly aired a Sunday edition as well, but this was dropped when the network added The Strombo Show on Sunday nights.

It ended September 2, 2017, and was replaced by After Dark with Odario Williams.
