= Novillero =

- Origin: Winnipeg, Manitoba, Canada
- Genres: Indie rock, pop
- Years active: 1999–2010
- Label: Mint
- Members: Dave Berthiaume; Rejean Ricard; Rod Slaughter; Sean Stevens; Jack Jonasson
- Past members: Rusty Matyas; Grant Johnson; Scott Hildebrandt; Roberta Dempster

Novillero is a Canadian indie pop band formed in 1999 in Winnipeg, Manitoba. Their musical style has been dubbed "mod-pop".

== History ==
Novillero was formed in 1999 by keyboardist Roberta Dempster, guitarist Sean Stevens, and keyboardist-guitarist Scott Hildebrandt, who were former members of the Winnipeg lounge pop band Transonic, with the addition of Rod Slaughter (Duotang), Dave Berthiaume (Bulletproof Nothing), and Rusty Matyas (The Waking Eyes). The band's first touring effort in late 1999 was cut short when a traffic accident destroyed much of the band's equipment.

The band released The Brindleford Follies on Endearing Records in 2001, toured moderately in support of its release, and then separated in early 2002.

After nearly a year apart, Slaughter, Stevens, Berthiaume and Matyas reunited to play a one-off show with new songs. The music then was heading in a new direction, relying less on spacey psychedelia and more on keyboard-driven pop hooks while retaining enough of their mod influence to bridge the gap. They added Grant Johnson when Matyas scaled back his input to focus on his other band, The Waking Eyes.

In 2005, the band released its second album, Aim Right for the Holes in Their Lives. and toured to support it. The Globe and Mail's music critic hailed the band's 2005 show at the Winnipeg Folk Festival as one of the best Canadian rock concerts of the year. Jack Jonasson, formerly of the Paperbacks, began playing live shows as a vocalist and instrumentalist formally in 2007.

Novillero has been featured in several television shows, including Monk and Eureka. In Monk, Novillero appears in the season 5 episode "Mr. Monk Goes to a Rock Concert" and they play the songs "The Laissez-Faire System" and "Gaining Ground/Losing Sight". In season 1, episode 6 of Eureka the band can be heard playing a cover of Barry McGuire's "Eve of Destruction". In season 2, episode 10 "The Art of Carrying On", a track off of Aim Right for the Holes in Their Lives was featured.

After disbanding in 2010, the group came together again in early 2016 to perform at the Winnipeg Big Fun Festival. The group came together again in 2023 at the Burt Block Party in their hometown of Winnipeg.

== Members ==
- Rod Slaughter – vocals and keys
- Sean Stevens – guitars
- Dave Berthiaume – drums and vocals
- Rejean Ricard – bass and vocals
- Jack Jonasson – instrumentalist and vocalist

== Past members ==
- Scott Hildebrandt – guitar, keys and vocals (1999–2001)
- Rusty Matyas – trumpet, keys and vocals (1999–2002)
- Roberta Dempster – keys, vocals and guitar (1999–2002)

== Discography ==
- The Brindleford Follies (2001)
- Aim Right for the Holes in Their Lives (2005)
- A Little Tradition (2008)
