= RadioSonic =

- Genre: music
- Country of origin: Canada
- Language(s): English
- Home station: CBC Radio 2
- Starring: Leora Kornfeld (1997-1999); David Wisdom (1997-2001); Grant Lawrence (2001-2003)
- Original release: 1997 – 2003

RadioSonic was a Canadian radio program, which aired on CBC Radio 2 from 1997 to 2003.

RadioSonic, which aired on Saturday and Sunday evenings, was originally created by combining two predecessor programs, David Wisdom's Night Lines and Leora Kornfeld's RealTime. Both Wisdom and Kornfeld initially remained as cohosts of the new program, which profiled Canadian indie rock and alternative music, as well as other performing arts such as comedy and spoken word poetry. In its second season, the program's format was changed, with the Saturday night episode becoming more music-oriented and the Sunday episode being reduced in length and serving more as a magazine-style show for documentary and cultural features.

In 1999 Kornfeld left the show to pursue academic studies in England, although she remained an occasional part-time contributor, and Wisdom became the sole host.

In 2001, producer and contributor Grant Lawrence became the host of the program. Around this time, the Sunday episode was discontinued, with the program now airing only on Saturday nights. During this era, the CBC's new media division was launching the CBC Radio 3 webcasting project, and in 2003 RadioSonic was integrated into and renamed CBC Radio 3.

With the evolution of Radio 3 into a satellite radio station in 2005, the Saturday evening program on CBC Radio 2 became a simulcast of the satellite network until it was discontinued from Radio Two on March 17, 2007.
