= David Wisdom =

Canadian artist and former radio personality

David Wisdom is a Canadian artist and former radio personality, best known as the host of Night Lines, RadioSonic, Radio-On, and Pearls of Wisdom on CBC Radio 2. He has been called "the Canadian equivalent of John Peel".

Since his retirement in 2007, he has exhibited as a photo media artist. His photographic series from 1969 to 1979 documents the development of the city of Vancouver.
