= CBC Music =

Canadian radio network and streaming music website

Coordinates: 43.64455°N 79.38804°W

- Type: Radio network
- Country: Canada

Programming
- Format: Adult Album Alternative - Adult Contemporary - Classical - Jazz - Folk - World music

Ownership
- Owner: Canadian Broadcasting Corporation

History
- Launch date: 1946; 80 years ago
- Former names: CBC FM (1960–1962, 1964–1975); CBC Stereo (1975–1997); CBC Radio 2 (1997–2018)

Coverage
- Availability: National, through regional FM stations

Links
- Website: CBC Music

CBC Music (formerly known as CBC FM, CBC Stereo and CBC Radio 2) is a non-commercial Canadian FM radio network operated by the Canadian Broadcasting Corporation. It began by primarily concentrating on classical and jazz music. In 2007 and 2008, the network transitioned towards a new "adult music" format with a variety of genres, reducing classical to six hours in middays. In 2009, Radio 2 averaged 2.1 million listeners weekly; it was the second-largest radio network in Canada.

== History ==
=== Launch ===
The CBC's FM network was launched in 1946, but was strictly a simulcast of the AM radio network until 1960. In that year, distinct programming on the FM network began. It was discontinued in 1962, but resumed again in 1964.

In November 1971, the CBC filed license applications for new English-language FM stations in St. John's, Halifax, and Calgary; and in French in Quebec City, Ottawa, and Chicoutimi. It told the Canadian Radio-Television and Telecommunications Commission (CRTC) that it intended to start a second "more extended and more leisurely" program service on its FM stations, tentatively to be called "Radio Two".

On November 3, 1975, the FM network was renamed CBC Stereo; this was to distinguish it from the AM network, known as CBC Radio.

In the early 1990s, the CBC began offering selected programs on the Internet, most notably CBC Stereo's RealTime. In September 1996, the corporation formally launched live audio streaming of both CBC Radio and CBC Stereo.

Since the 1980s, many of the AM CBC Radio stations moved to FM due to the limitations of AM broadcasting; as such, in 1997 the CBC renamed the networks CBC Radio One and CBC Radio Two. There are only a few CBC Radio stations still operating on the AM band in Canada, primarily in the West.

For much of its history, its programming focused on arts and culture, and primarily consisted of programs devoted to opera, classical music, jazz and theatre. Some programming devoted to Canadian pop and indie rock music was also aired, via the Saturday night CBC Radio 3 simulcast and predecessors such as RadioSonic, Night Lines, and the late-night programme Brave New Waves.

=== 2007 format change ===
In 2006, speculation arose that Radio Two programming would undergo a format and name change, similar to that which its French counterpart Espace musique undertook in 2004; however, no plans were announced until January 2007. These changes, which took effect March 19, resulted in a tighter focus on music – still primarily classical but also including jazz, world music, and live music of all types. The length and frequency of newscasts, which had essentially duplicated those heard on Radio One, was reduced dramatically. The 2007 revamp also resulted in a subtle name change from Radio Two to Radio 2.

In March 2008, the CBC announced plans to complete the transformation of Radio 2, significantly altering its daytime programming lineup. These plans resulted in the "New Radio 2", starting September 2, 2008. In essence, the morning and afternoon drive programs, which had focused almost exclusively on classical music, were replaced with new shows featuring a wider range of genres. The goal, according to the CBC, was to increase exposure of musicians and genres, other than classical and jazz, which received little airtime on private radio.

Concomitantly, four web radio streams – all-classical, jazz, singer-songwriter, and "Canadian composer" – were introduced.

On June 10, the CBC announced that hosts associated with the new programming would include Julie Nesrallah, Molly Johnson and Rich Terfry.

==== Reception ====
Logo as CBC Radio 2 (2007–2016)

There was a vocal, negative response to these changes from a variety of sources connected with the community ranging from Facebook to blogs to newspaper columnists. National protests were also held at CBC facilities across the country. However, the move drew support from other corners of the cultural community, noting in many cases the low ratings of the existing service. Among the supporters were several critically acclaimed artists who would benefit from the changes.

While critics, particularly Globe and Mail columnist Russell Smith, raised the spectre of the network airing mainstream pop artists such as Nelly Furtado and The Black Eyed Peas, the network's popular music component consists almost exclusively of artists who would be classified as adult album alternative, folk, world music or singer-songwriter pop – and very few of whom receive any airplay whatsoever on commercial radio. For instance, on one representative day in 2009, Radio 2 Morning's "pop" playlist included Feist, John Mayer, Blue Rodeo, Sloan, Neil Young, Whiskeytown, Spirit of the West, Sharon Jones & The Dap-Kings, Joni Mitchell, Matthew Barber, Eleni Mandell, Skydiggers, Billy Bragg, Jeremy Fisher, Jim Bryson, The Be Good Tanyas, The Duhks, Sarah Slean, Stephen Fearing, Melissa McClelland, Cowboy Junkies, Howie Beck and the Band.

On May 2, 2008, the president of the CBC and the director of programming attended a meeting of the Parliamentary Standing Committee for Canadian Heritage. There appeared to be opposition to the movement away from classical music on Radio 2 from MPs of all three main parties represented on the committee. Committee members Bill Siksay and Ed Fast were particularly opposed to the programming changes. The committee voted unanimously to hold further hearings specifically on the CBC Radio 2 changes in September 2008.

Despite the controversy, the format change was successful for the network, which maintained a consistent overall audience while lowering the average age of its listenership from 65 to 52 in January 2010.

=== 2010s ===
On February 6, 2018, the CBC announced that Radio 2 would be rebranded as CBC Music, aligning with the branding of the corporation's music website and digital audio service (discussed below).

=== 2020s ===
During the COVID-19 pandemic in Canada, the service temporarily shifted to a playlist of exclusively Canadian music, to help support Canadian musicians impacted by the cancellations of their concert tours.

== Distribution ==
The network is not as widely available across Canada as Radio One. While Radio One is available in most communities across Canada regardless of size and primary language, CBC Music for the most part is available only in larger cities. Only 14 transmitters across Canada are licensed as originating stations within the network, compared to over 30 for Radio One, although some additional cities are also served by rebroadcasters of one of the originating stations. The service is provided in some form to virtually all of Canada's major cities and all provincial capitals. CBC Music also has a more consistent national schedule than Radio One; currently the originating stations produce only limited regional programming, such as weather updates. In the past these stations would also air local news summaries or a daily calendar of local arts and culture events; this was dropped in 2007. CBH-FM in Halifax produces an additional regional music program for the Atlantic Canada region, due to a scheduling hole caused by the time zone difference.

In some smaller communities, especially in rural northern British Columbia, community groups have been licensed to rebroadcast a CBC Music station on a local low-power radio transmitter. These transmitters are owned by the community group rather than the network; the station so not have any original programming at all.

On satellite, the network's programming can also be heard on Bell Satellite TV and Shaw Direct. Unlike Radio One and Radio 3, CBC Music is not carried by SiriusXM Satellite Radio; the CRTC requires that a "Canadian" channel (for the purposes of Sirius Canada, which carried CBC programming prior to its merger with XM Radio Canada) must carry 85% Canadian musical content, a requirement that has not been imposed on (or met by) the terrestrial network. Even so, a handful of programs that did meet this criterion, such as Deep Roots, have aired on Radio One's Sirius XM feed (channel 169); for a period in the mid-2010s, CBC Music also programmed a separate service for SiriusXM, CBC Music Sonica, which was devoted exclusively to Canadian music. This channel was later discontinued.

CBC Music is also available via the internet in webradio and podcast form. Between October 2013 and September 2016, access to the network's domestic internet streams was blocked for listeners outside Canada. The CBC stated that they were not allowed to broadcast advertising outside of Canada. Two ad-free streams – Eastern International and Pacific International – were made available for international users. On these streams, commercials were replaced with CBC promos and other filler content. After the CRTC ordered the CBC to stop broadcasting ads on the network in 2016, international users have regained access to all five domestic streams.

=== Stations ===
Only stations which are licensed as "originating stations" within the network are listed here. Some stations also have rebroadcasters in smaller outlying markets; these are listed in each station's separate article.

- Calgary, Alberta – CBR-FM
- Edmonton, Alberta – CBX-FM
- Halifax, Nova Scotia – CBH-FM
- Montreal, Quebec – CBM-FM
- Ottawa, Ontario – CBOQ-FM
- Regina, Saskatchewan – CBK-FM
- St. John's, Newfoundland and Labrador – CBN-FM
- Sudbury, Ontario – CBBS-FM
- Sydney, Nova Scotia – CBI-FM
- Thunder Bay, Ontario – CBQ-FM
- Toronto, Ontario – CBL-FM
- Vancouver, British Columbia – CBU-FM
- Windsor, Ontario – CBE-FM
- Winnipeg, Manitoba – CBW-FM

=== Former affiliates ===
- Kentville, Nova Scotia - CKWM-FM - disaffiliated in 1988.
- London, Ontario - CFPL-FM - disaffiliated in 1972. (Later replaced by CBBL-FM, a rebroadcaster of CBL-FM Toronto.)
- Red Deer, Alberta - CKRD-FM - disaffiliated in 1981.

=== Website ===
On February 13, 2012, the CBC launched CBC Music as an internet radio platform, featuring the existing CBC Radio services and 47 dedicated channels devoted to particular genres of music. The service is distributed via the CBC Music website, and accompanying mobile apps, initially launched for Android, iOS, and BlackBerry OS. Some of the genre webstreams were already provided by Radio 2 or Radio 3, while others were new offerings at the 2012 launch; over time, however, the names and formats of the genre streams have evolved significantly, with some of the original streams having been discontinued in favour of new ones, reformatted to alter their genre focus, or renamed to align their branding with the network's programming.

The service was launched shortly after the CBC reached a music licensing deal with the Audio-Video Licensing Agency in January 2012. The site was one of the first large-scale ventures into online broadcasting to be available in Canada since the launch of Iceberg Radio in 1997; at the time of CBC Music's launch, popular international ventures such as Pandora or Spotify remained unavailable to Canadian consumers.

A similar site, IciMusique.ca (formerly espace.mu, in reference to former radio branding Espace Musique), is also offered by CBC Music's French-language counterpart Ici Musique.

Shortly after the service's launch, Stingray Digital filed a complaint with the Canadian Radio-Television and Telecommunications Commission, alleging that the CBC's access to government funding gave it an unfair competitive advantage over private for-profit services. Noting that the CBC pays the same copyright royalties to SOCAN as the competing services and that it places a much greater emphasis on Canadian content than the commercial services, the CRTC dismissed the complaint in August 2012.

In December 2013, the site also launched the first issue of CBC Music Magazine, an e-magazine distributed in both iOS and Android formats. The magazine is no longer published.

With the rebranding of Radio 2 in 2018, the website is considered to be part of the radio network's operations rather than a distinct division of the CBC, although the individual genre streams and Radio 3 are still provided. In October 2019, the CBC Music app was merged into CBC Listen, a new app that also incorporates Radio One programming and the CBC's podcasts.

== Programming ==
Although most programming on CBC Music is exclusive to the network, some specialty programs, including The Vinyl Cafe (until 2015), Vinyl Tap, C'est formidable!, Backstage with Ben Heppner and Canada Live, have also aired on Radio One in different time slots.

Until 2007, Radio 2 simulcast the majority of Radio One's newscasts, including The World at Six and World Report, resulting in several lengthy breaks from music throughout the day. This ended in March 2007, when Radio 2 began to carry a separate news service, with news updates of 90 seconds in length a handful of times each day. The length was soon changed to 4 ½ minutes, the usual length of the CBC's non-major newscasts, with the frequency increased slightly. However, newscasts on Radio 2 remain distinct from those on Radio One.

During the 2005 Canadian Media Guild lockout, the normal schedule was temporarily replaced by continuous music from Galaxie (then owned by the CBC), except for short news updates at the top of each hour from 6 a.m. to 7 p.m. local time.

After the 2012 federal budget, the CBC applied to the CRTC for permission to introduce commercial advertisements on CBC Radio 2 and sister network Espace Musique. In October 2013, the network began broadcasting a limited amount of advertising, up to four minutes an hour, with a goal of broadcasting up to nine minutes per hour in 2016. Ad-free streams of the Toronto and Vancouver feeds were introduced online for international listeners. On August 31, 2016, the CRTC denied CBC's request to continue airing commercial advertisements until August 31, 2018. Consequently, advertising ceased on September 1, 2016.

CBC Music also produces the television series CBC Music Backstage Pass, featuring live performances by musicians, for CBC Television.

=== Weekday programming ===
The network's weekday programming does not vary significantly from day to day; except in the 6–7 p.m. hour, when a different one-hour weekly program normally airs each day, the schedule is otherwise consistent from Mondays to Fridays. Mornings, hosted by Damhnait Doyle, airs in the morning drive slot, and is followed at 9 a.m. by the classical music show Tempo, hosted by Julie Nesrallah. About Time, hosted by Tom Allen, airs in the early afternoons, followed by Drive, hosted by Rich Terfry.

The 6 p.m. to 7 p.m. block includes CBC Music Live, a program that presents recordings of live concerts by Canadian musicians, on Mondays; Frequencies, a world music program hosted by Errol Nazareth, on Tuesdays; Reclaimed, hosted by Jarrett Martineau and devoted to indigenous music, on Wednesdays; CBC Music Top 20, a countdown show currently hosted by Grant Lawrence, on Thursdays; and Marvin's Room, hosted by A. Harmony and devoted to rhythm and blues, on Fridays. This block aired from 7 to 8 p.m. until February 2021, when it was moved to 6 p.m.

Angeline Tetteh-Wayoe hosts The Block, a program devoted to black music genres such as hip hop, soul and rhythm and blues, at 7 p.m. Odario Williams hosts After Dark in the evenings, while Nightstream, a hostless stream of continuous music, airs overnights.

At various times during the day, Grant Lawrence is also heard voicing short segments presenting music news, such as a short profile of a musician who has just released a new album.

=== Weekend programming ===
On Saturday and Sunday, Mornings airs with host Saroja Coelho. For the remainder of the day, however, the network airs a variety of specialty programs, mainly devoted to particular genres of music, rather than replicating the weekday schedule.

Saturday programming includes My Playlist, Centre Stage, Saturday Afternoon at the Opera, Backstage with Ben Heppner, Saturday Night Blues with Holger Petersen and Saturday Night Jazz with Laila Biali.

Sunday programming includes Choral Concert, In Concert with Paolo Pietropaolo, Inside the Music, and C'est formidable! with Florence K. On Sunday nights, the network rebroadcasts Radio One's regional weekend music and culture shows from Toronto (Big City, Small World), Atlantic Canada (East Coast Music Hour), Alberta (Key of A) and British Columbia (Vibin').

On both Saturdays and Sundays, Nightstream again airs after midnight.

=== Past programming ===
- After Hours with Andy Sheppard (previously Ross Porter) – jazz; weeknights
- Brave New Waves (1984–2007) – alternative music, weekdays at midnight. Hosts Augusta La Paix, Brent Bambury and Patti Schmidt.
- DiscDrive with Jurgen Gothe – classical, with some jazz and bluegrass; weekday afternoon drive (1985–2008)
- Here's to You with Catherine Belyea (previously Shelley Solmes) – by-request classical music; weekday mid-mornings, Based on the earlier program Take Five, hosted by Solmes and earlier by Shelagh Rogers
- In Performance with Andrew Craig (previously Eric Friesen) – live-to-tape classical performances; weeknights
- Music and Company with Tom Allen – classical music; weekday mornings
- Music for a While with Danielle Charbonneau – classical music; weekday evenings
- Night Lines (1982–1997) – alternative music, Saturday overnight. Hosts Ron Robinson, Ralph Benmergui, David Wisdom.
- Northern Lights with Andrea Ratuski (and predecessor That Time of the Night) – soft classical music; early morning (also aired late evenings on Radio One)
- RSVP – classical music requests by listeners, hosted by David Lennick and later by Leon Cole; after Cole's retirement the program was taken over by Bill Richardson and retitled As You Like It
- Off the Record with Bob Kerr – various classical music; weekday afternoons
- RadioSonic/CBC Radio 3 (1997–2007) – alternative music on Saturday nights. Hosts Leora Kornfeld, David Wisdom, Grant Lawrence and Alexis Mazurin.
- Shift with Tom Allen - mixed genres; weekday afternoons
- The Strombo Show - contemporary music across multiple genres, hosted by George Stroumboulopoulos from 2009 to 2023
- Studio Sparks with Eric Friesen – classical, with some jazz and world music; early weekday afternoons
- Two New Hours with Larry Lake – contemporary classical and new music

== Searchlight ==
Prior to the launch of CBC Music, CBC Radio 3 broadcast an annual "Searchlight" contest, soliciting listener votes in a process to determine the "best" of various aspects of the Canadian music industry. The topic of Searchlight was different each year, with contests focusing on such themes as Canada's best live music club, best music festival and best music website.

Following the launch of CBC Music, Searchlight was relaunched as a platform-wide contest to determine Canada's best unsigned musical artist. Incorporating participation from both CBC Music and CBC Radio One, the process begins with a series of local competitions produced by Radio One's local afternoon shows. Listener feedback and online voting determines the artists who advance to the next round, until the national stage of the competition begins on Q.

When the list has been narrowed to ten artists, three established musicians step in as judges, who each pick their own favourite act. Those three artists and an audience selection as determined by online voting advance to the final round as the four finalists, following which the judges debate and discuss the choices before voting on the ultimate winner. In 2018, the process was revised, with the judges selecting five artists and a public vote selecting five artists, for a list of ten finalists rather than four.

The winner of the competition wins $20,000 in musical gear from Yamaha Music, as well as a slot on the bill at the CBC Music Festival.

Beginning in 2022, the competition also instituted a Fan Choice Award, presented to the three top vote-getters in the first stage of the competition regardless of how they fared through the later stages.

=== Winners and finalists ===
Year	Winner	Finalists	Judges	Ref
2013	Sherman Downey and the Ambiguous Case	Good Ol' Goats		
2014	Lauren Mann and the Fairly Odd Folk	Jofo, Erin Saoirse Adair, Fitness Club Fiasco	Torquil Campbell, Sarah Slean, Kardinal Offishall	
2015	Orange O'Clock	Scary Bear Soundtrack, The Fall Line, Ivory Hours	Dan Boeckner, Jenn Grant, Saukrates	
2016	Desirée Dawson	Andi, Dylan Menzie, Teo Milea	Maestro Fresh Wes, Sarah Blackwood, Dallas Smith	
2017	The Long War	Will, The Wolfe, Jaryd Stanley	Jarvis Church, Ruth B, Dan Kanter	
2018	Aquakultre	Sara Diamond, Fallbrigade, Sinzere, Jordana Talsky, Amanda Jackson Band, C.C. Trubiak, Chloe Hataley, The Kwerks, Scarlet Sway	Kristen Burke, Ian Campeau, Allan Reid	
2019	Shopé	Benita, Madison Olds, Quincy Morales, Reeny Smith, The Royal Foundry, Titus Calderbank, Brenna Parker, Rani Chatoorgoon, Taken by Sanity	Zaki Ibrahim, Allan Reid, Vanessa Adora, Jess Knights, Kai Black	
2020	Shawnee Kish	Autumn Kings, Capri Everitt, Josh Sahunta, Kendra Kay, Ludic, Naya Ali, Little Destroyer, Cory Gallant, Maci Wood & Rich Roach	Zubin Thakkar, Vivian Barclay, Allan Reid, Julijana Capone, Kai Black	
2021	Jhyve	Anna B, BLK, Rachel Cousins, Treh Lamonte, Argel Monte de Ramos, Riell, The Royal Foundry, Elyse Saunders, Michaela Slinger		
2022	Chad Price	Angel "Siibii" Baribeau, Capri Everitt, Justin Fancy, Fionn, Kresnt, Meltt, Mindflip, Riell, Roveena		
2023	Mattmac	Amanda Jordan, Aviv, B00sted, Cam Kahin, Eric Punzo, Group Project, Liyah Katana, Maggie Andrew, TheHonestGuy	Andrés Mendoza, Amanda Rheaume, Justin Gray, Karla Moy	
2024	Maggie Andrew	Calling All Captains, Chloé Caroline, Housewife, Jaguar Sun, Kam Prada, Madisyn Gifford, Maurice Moore, Nobro, Omega Mighty	Charlie Wall-Andrews, Alan Greyeyes, Andrés Mendoza, Keziah Myers	

== CBC Music Festival ==
In May 2013, the service sponsored the first CBC Music Festival, which was staged every spring at Ontario Place's Echo Beach.

Each year's event featured a lineup of acts from several different genres, including the winner of that year's Searchlight competition, and sometimes included a live taping of a performance by a CBC Radio comedy show.

- 2013 – Sam Roberts, Of Monsters and Men, Kathleen Edwards, Sloan, Corb Lund and the Hurtin' Albertans, Half Moon Run, Jarvis Church, Elisapie Isaac, Aidan Knight, Kae Sun, Shakura S'Aida, Sherman Downey and the Ambiguous Case.
- 2014 – Tegan and Sara, Arkells, Crystal Shawanda, Chad VanGaalen, Spoon, Hannah Georgas, Wake Owl, The Belle Game, Dan Mangan, Lauren Mann and the Fairly Odd Folk, The Irrelevant Show
- 2015 – Patrick Watson, Bahamas, Cœur de pirate, Joel Plaskett, The Strumbellas, Shad, Jenn Grant, Lindi Ortega, Tanika Charles, Choir! Choir! Choir!, The Debaters, Fred Penner, Mamma Yamma, Orange O'Clock.
- 2016 – Maestro Fresh Wes, Tanya Tagaq, Whitehorse, Tokyo Police Club, Alvvays, The New Pornographers, Buck 65, Hey Rosetta!, Desirée Dawson, Terra Lightfoot, John River, Ria Mae, Zaki Ibrahim, The Franklin Electric, Julian Taylor, Laura Sauvage, Charlotte Cardin, Emilie & Ogden, Megan Bonnell.
- 2017 – Serena Ryder, Walk Off the Earth, Keys N Krates, Ruth B, Scott Helman, Bobby Bazini, Austra, BROS, William Prince, Sarah Slean, Alx Veliz, Iskwé, Ralph, Valley, The Long War.
- 2018 – July Talk, A Tribe Called Red, Charlotte Day Wilson, The Rural Alberta Advantage, Northern Touch All-Stars, Yukon Blonde, Busty and the Bass, The Jerry Cans, Milk & Bone, Fortunate Ones, Boogat, Logan Staats, Johnny Balik, Ammoye, Midnight Shine, Caveboy, Aquakultre.
- 2019 – Alvvays, Stars, Rhye, Cœur de pirate, Buffy Sainte-Marie, Charlotte Cardin, Peach Pit, Hubert Lenoir, Elisapie, Exco Levi, The Courtneys, Nuela Charles, Emmanuel Jal, Laila Biali, Gabrielle Shonk, Samantha Martin & Delta Sugar, Shopé.
- 2020 – The 2020 festival was cancelled due to the COVID-19 pandemic in Canada. Artists who had been scheduled to perform included Metric, Half Moon Run, Lights, Jeremy Dutcher, Dizzy, Geoffroy, Haviah Mighty, Snotty Nose Rez Kids, Tanika Charles and Tedy.
