= Betti-Cola =

Studio album by Cub
- Released: October 1, 1993
- Recorded: August 23, 1992 – August 15, 1993
- Studio: Noizi (Vancouver); Yoyo (Olympia)
- Genre: Cuddlecore
- Length: 48:00
- Label: Mint
- Producer: Jean Smith; Cub; Nicolas Bragg; Anthony Hempell; Pat Maley; Dave Carswell; Kevin Komoda; Adam Sloan

Cub chronology
Betti-Cola (1993)	Come Out Come Out (1995)

Betti-Cola is the debut album by the Canadian band Cub. It was released on October 1, 1993, by Mint Records. The album was remastered and re-released with bonus tracks in 2007.

The album contains tracks taken from various 7-inch EPs as well as a handful of covers. A 12-song double 7-inch EP titled Betti-Cola, with similar cover art, was released at roughly the same time as the CD.

The cover art is by Archie Comics cartoonist Dan DeCarlo.

== Recording ==
Cub recorded Betti-Cola primarily with microphones and a Digital Audio Tape machine. The album was recorded in various locations, including in Olympia, Washington, and at CBC Television.

== Reception ==
Professional ratings
Review scores
Source	Rating
AllMusic	4.5/5 stars
Pitchfork	8.0/10

"While the band's primitive, sweet formula changes little over the duration of the set," wrote Jason Ankeny in a retrospective review for AllMusic, "the performances grow more assured with each passing track; whether tackling Lisa Marr's own infectious compositions ... or well-chosen covers ... Cub's naive charm is irresistible." Ira Robbins of Trouser Press likewise found that as a whole, the album captures Cub's "increasing musical strength and confidence (especially on the part of guitarist Robynn Iwata and singer/bassist Lisa Marr; a procession of drummers make rhythmic progress impossible to chart)." Pitchfork's Marc Hogan stated that "like Jonathan Richman post-Modern Lovers, Cub prove that childlike whimsy can be, in the words of Joe Harvard, 'a purer form of rebellion.'"

== Track listing ==
All songs written by Cub, except where indicated.

1. "Go Fish" – 2:00
2. "What the Water Gave Me" – 1:14
3. "Motel 6" – 2:21
4. "A Party" – 1:18
5. "Flying Carpet" – 2:38
6. "My Chinchilla" – 1:23
7. "Electric Chair" – 2:33
8. "Nicolas Bragg" – 1:56
9. "Pretty Pictures" – 1:38
10. "They Don't" – 1:40
11. "A Picnic" – 1:24
12. "It's True" – 1:28
13. "Someday" – 1:44
14. "Cast a Shadow" (Beat Happening cover) – 2:12
15. "The Day We Met" – 1:34
16. "Surfer Girl" (The Beach Boys cover) – 1:33
17. "Little Star" – 1:13
18. "My Assassin" – 1:51
19. "Tell Me Now" (Daniel Johnston cover) – 3:00
20. "Lucky 7" – 1:46
21. "Through My Hoop" – 2:25
22. "Leapfrog" – 2:10
23. "Backwoods" (Windwalker cover) – 3:14
24. "What the Water Gave Me" (performed by NFA; Cub cover) – 3:45

2007 reissue bonus tracks

25. "Chico" – 1:15
26. "Sweet Pea" (Tommy Roe cover) – 1:24
27. "Summer Samba" (Astrud Gilberto cover) – 1:41
28. "Hello Kitty" – 1:33
29. "Wipeout!" (live) (unlisted) – 0:20

Notes

- Tracks 1–4 and 25 are from the Pep 7-inch EP.
- Tracks 5–8 and 27 are from the Hot Dog Day 7-inch EP.
- Tracks 9–13, 17, 18, 20, 22, 23, 26, and 28 are from the Betti-Cola double 7-inch EP.
- Tracks 14–16, 19, 21, 23, 24, and 29 are unique to the album, though alternate versions of 14, 15, and 21 appeared on the "Volcano" 7-inch single, Pep, and Hot Dog Day, respectively.

== Personnel ==
Credits are adapted from the album's liner notes.

Cub

- Lisa Marr – vocals, bass
- Robynn Iwata – guitar, backup vocals (tracks 1 and 15)
- Valeria Fellini – drums (tracks 1–8 and 17–23), backup vocals (track 1)
- Neko Case – drums (tracks 12 and 14–16)

Additional musicians

- Dave Carswell – drums (tracks 9, 10, and 13), acoustic guitar (tracks 11 and 13), glockenspiel (track 9)
- NFA (Jason Ogden, Andrew Earle, Craig Moore) – guest performance (track 24)

Production

- Jean Smith – production (tracks 1–4)
- Cub – production (tracks 1–23)
- Adam Sloan – engineering (tracks 1–8 and 17–23), production (tracks 17–23)
- Nicolas Bragg – production (tracks 5–8)
- Anthony Hempell – production (tracks 5–8)
- Pat Maley – production and engineering (tracks 9–13)
- Dave Carswell – production (tracks 9–13)
- Kevin Komoda – production (tracks 14–16)
- Anthony "Fu" Valcic – mastering, assembly

Design

- Dan DeCarlo – cover drawing
- Derrick Hanni – outer back cover photograph
- Allen May – booklet back cover photograph
- Miles Constable, Bill Baker, Lisa Marr, Robynn Iwata, Allen May, Derrick Hanni, Linda Scholten – booklet photographs
- Adam, Melanie, Valeria Fellini – booklet drawings
