= The Brothers-in-Law =

Canadian satirical musical group

- Origin: Windsor, Ontario, Canada
- Genres: Satire, folk, show tunes
- Years active: 1963–1970
- Labels: Arc Records
- Members: Alec Somerville; Howard Duffy; Larry Reaume; Ken Clarke; Bob Lee

The Brothers-in-Law was a Canadian satirical musical group that was active from 1963 to 1970. They recorded six albums and generated occasional controversy because of their subject matter.

== History ==
The members were songwriter Alec Somerville on banjo, Howard Duffy on guitar, Larry Reaume on guitar, and Ken Clarke on bass. Somerville, Duffy and Clarke were police officers, hence the name Brothers-in-Law. Reaume was the City of Windsor's district fire chief. In 1965, Clarke left the band and was replaced by school teacher Bob Lee. In 1966, Duffy left the band, but was not replaced. Everyone kept their day jobs, and only performed about a dozen concerts a year. Their repertoire consisted mainly of musical satire poking fun at the Canadian government, sex and censorship, the law, and consumer issues; their music was a mixture of original songs and adaptations of folk and stage tunes (particularly based on Gilbert and Sullivan).

The band's most popular recording was the album Oh! Oh! Canada, released in 1965, which sold between 100,000 and 275,000 copies (sources vary as to the exact number). The album's best known songs included "Rally Around the New Flag", which lampooned the extensive political battles over the then-new "Maple Leaf" national flag design, and "The Pill", which satirized the then-topical issue of the birth control pill. The latter song was somewhat controversial for its subject matter and the album liner notes contained a warning to radio stations not to play the song.

The band recorded five albums of songs and several singles in Canada. They also recorded an album for release in the United States which included a new rendition of "The Pill" as well as "Canada, U.S.A.", a song about Canadian-American similarities and the long-standing debate over whether Canada should become the 51st state (this song was later covered by The Travellers).

The group disbanded in 1970. Duffy died in 2010, age 79. Clarke died in 2013, age 86. Reaume died in 2024, age 87.

In 1982, a compilation album entitled Oh! Oh! Canada, Eh? was released. As an acknowledgment of changing morality, whereas the band's first album contained a warning about broadcasting "The Pill", the compilation amended the warning to say "be our guest."

The Evaporators reference The Brothers-in-Law in their song "Gerda Musinger" (about the woman of the same name) on the album Ripple Rock. Nardwuar the Human Serviette sings, "The Brothers-in-Law sang about her first / but let's further whet your thirst!"

In 2008, the Quebec-based label Unidisc reissued most of the group's albums over a three-volume CD series. Volume 1 collected Oh! Oh! Canada and Strike Again; Volume 2 featured Exposé '67 and Onward the Establishment, while Volume 3 collected The Pill and the previously unissued recordings featured in the 1980s compilation Oh! Oh! Canada, Eh? The Canadian Encyclopedia entry for the group also lists a 1968 release entitled Total Lewdity, but this is erroneous. Somerville recorded a solo album for Arc Records entitled Total Nudity, but not as a member of The Brothers-in-Law.

== Discography ==
Albums

- Oh! Oh! Canada (1965), Arc Records
- The Pill Administered Orally By The Brothers-in-Law (1966), Arc Records
- The Brothers-in-Law Strike Again (1966), Arc Records
- Exposé '67 (1967), Arc Records
- Onward The Establishment (1969), Arc Records

Singles

- "Can You Say You Didn't Know" / "The Wreck Of The Carl D. Bradley" (1966)
- "The Pill" / "K-K-K-Klansmen" (1966)
- "Canada, USA" (1966)
- "Hockey Night In Canada" / "Come Up To Canada" (1967)
- The Christmas Mad-Rigal" / "Christmas Snow" (1967)
- Nashville, Tennessee" / "Buy Now, Pay Later" (1968)

Compilations

- Oh! Oh! Canada, Eh? (1982), AHED
- The Brothers-In-Law, Vol. 1: Oh! Oh! Canada / Strike Again (2008, re-issued 2016), Unidisc Music
- The Brothers-In-Law, Vol. 2: Expose '67 / The Establishment (2008, re-issued 2016), Unidisc Music
- The Brothers-In-Law, Vol. 3: The Pill / Oh! Oh! Canada, Eh? (2008, re-issued 2016), Unidisc Music
