= Get Outta Dodge =

Studio album by Huevos Rancheros
- Released: September 30, 1996
- Genre: Punk rock surf rock
- Label: Mint Records

Huevos Rancheros chronology
Dig In! (1995)	Get Outta Dodge (1996)	The Wedge (1999)

Get Outta Dodge is the third studio album by Huevos Rancheros, a Canadian punk rock band. It was released on September 30, 1996, on Mint Records. It was licensed out to Konkurrent Records in the Netherlands. The title refers to the expression "Get out of Dodge", an exhortation that was given in the drama series, Gunsmoke, to villains whom the heroes wanted out of Dodge City, Kansas.

Get Outta Dodge was the first album with new bassist Tom Kennedy, who replaced Graham Evans.

The album was a Juno Award nominee for Best Alternative Album at the Juno Awards of 1998.

== Track listing ==
All songs written by Brent J. Cooper, Tom Kennedy and Richie Lazarowich, except where noted.

1. "What a Way to Run a Railroad"
2. "Interstate Death Toll"
3. "Shadow of the Apache"
4. "Smartbomb" (Cooper/Evans/Lazarowich)
5. "Get Outta Dodge" (Cooper/Evans/Lazarowich)
6. "Night of the Iguana"
7. "The Lonely Bull" (Sol Lake)
