= Ripple Rock (album) =

Studio album by the Evaporators
- Released: 2004
- Studio: The Factory and JD/DC, Vancouver, BC, Canada
- Genre: Garage rock
- Label: Mint; Nardwuar; Alternative Tentacles

The Evaporators chronology
I Gotta Rash (1998)	Ripple Rock (2004)

Professional ratings
Review scores
Source	Rating
AllMusic	3/5 stars

Ripple Rock is the Evaporators' third album. It was released in 2004 in Canada by Mint Records and Nardwuar Records and elsewhere by Alternative Tentacles. The vinyl contained a free copy of Thee Dublins' self-titled 7". On the CD, these songs were included at the end of the album along with an extra "introduction" track, as well as several music videos and interviews that could be accessed by putting the CD into a CD-ROM drive.

== Differences between the CD and the vinyl ==
There are several differences between the vinyl and CD releases of Ripple Rock. The art and layout are slightly different, with the CD having the edge on quantity, although the record offers larger images. The most notable difference is that the last five tracks on the CD are taken off the vinyl, although four of them make their way onto a 7" insert. The 8-Track release has the same track listing as the vinyl release.

=== CD track listing ===
Tracks 1–18 by The Evaporators unless noted otherwise Tracks 19–23 by Thee Dublins unless noted otherwise

1. "Addicted to Cheese"
2. "I Feel Like a Fat Frustrated Fuck"
3. "Ripple Rock"
4. "Get off the Treadmill"
5. "(I've Got) Icicles on My Testicles"
6. "Nard Nest"
7. "I.D.N.M.F.T.T.M.W.M.F.A."
8. "Salad Bar"
9. "Half-Empty Halls"
10. "Cardboard Brains"
11. "Gerda Munsinger"
12. "Shittin' Party"
13. "Barney Rubble Is My Double" (The Hot Nasties)
14. "Nardwuar vs. Rahzel"
15. "I Quit School" (Pointed Sticks)
16. "Are You Mad at Me?"
17. "I Say That on Purpose to Bug You"
18. "Nardwuar vs. Snoop Doggy Dogg"
19. "Thee Dublins Intro (f. Terror T)" (T. Parker and A. Sloan)
20. "Maria"
21. "Uhhhh!"
22. "The Phasor"
23. "Telephone in Shoe"

=== Vinyl track listing ===
All tracks by The Evaporators unless noted otherwise

==== Side Nard ====
1. "Addicted to Cheese"
2. "I Feel Like a Fat Frustrated Fuck"
3. "Ripple Rock"
4. "Get off the Treadmill"
5. "(I've Got) Icicles on My Testicles"
6. "Nard Nest"
7. "I.D.N.M.F.T.T.M.W.M.F.A."
8. "Salad Bar"
9. "Half-Empty Halls"

==== Side Tentacle ====
1. "Cardboard Brains"
2. "Gerda Munsinger"
3. "Shittin' Party"
4. "Barney Rubble Is My Double" (The Hot Nasties)
5. "Nardwuar vs. Rahzel"
6. "I Quit School" (Pointed Sticks)
7. "Are You Mad at Me?"
8. "I Say That on Purpose to Bug You"
9. "Nardwuar vs. Snoop Doggy Dogg"

== Personnel ==
- David Carswell – guitar, vocals
- John Collins – bass, guitar, organ
- Scott Livingstone – drums
- Nardwuar – vocals, organ

with:

- Megan Barnes – vocals
- Rodney Graham – organ on #10
- Mike Ledwidge – piano on #1, organ on #6, #17
- Lisa Marr – vocals

Locations and technical

- Recorded at The Factory and JD/DC, Vancouver, BC, Canada, by John Collins and David Carswell
- Engineered at The Factory by Sheldon Zaharko
- Mastered by Jamie Sitar at Suite Sound Labs, Vancouver, BC, Canada
