= Wares (musical group) =

- Origin: Edmonton, Alberta, Canada
- Genres: Experimental rock; indie rock; noise rock; power pop
- Years active: 2013-present
- Labels: Mint Records

Wares is a Canadian musical project from Edmonton, Alberta, founded by Cassia Hardy in 2013. As of 2018, the live band consists of Hardy (vocals, guitar), Matthew Gooding (bass), Holly Greaves (drums) and Jamie McLean (keyboards). Wares has released one full-length album and four EPs.

== History ==
Wares began performing concerts in Edmonton in 2013. In 2016, Wares released a 7-inch single, entitled "Missed the Point" on Sweety Pie Records. "Beach Date," the b-side to the single, was nominated for an Edmonton Music Award in 2017 under the category Indie Rock Recording of the Year. In 2017, Wares released their first full-length album, which was self-titled. Wares' debut album brought more attention to the project and BeatRoute praised Hardy's musicianship, noting that her "punk attitude meets skillful composition" on the album. Wares performed at Sled Island Music and Arts Festival in 2015, 2016 and 2017.

In June 2018, Wares toured across Canada, performing in more than 20 cities.

Wares sophomore album, Survival, was released on April 24, 2020, by Vancouver indie label, Mint Records. The album was a long list nominee for the 2020 Polaris Music Prize.

In 2025, Hardy released her first solo single, "Empress", which commemorates Edmonton's Empress Ale House.

== Discography ==
=== Albums ===
- Survival (2020, Mint Records)
- Wares (2017)

=== Singles and EPs ===
- Silhouette (2018)
- Missed The Point (2016)
- City Kids (2014)
- Sunshine (2013)
