= Come Out Come Out =

Studio album by Cub
- Released: January 15, 1995
- Recorded: August 1994
- Studio: Lemon Loaf (Burnaby)
- Genre: Cuddlecore
- Length: 30:49
- Label: Mint
- Producers: Kevin Rose; Marc L'Espérance; Cub

Cub chronology
Betti-Cola (1993)	Come Out Come Out (1995)	Box of Hair (1996)

Come Out Come Out is the second album by the Canadian band Cub. It was released on January 15, 1995 by Mint Records. The album was later remastered and re-released with bonus tracks in 2007.

The cover art is by Fiona Smyth.

The track "New York City" was covered by They Might Be Giants on their 1996 album Factory Showroom. The New York City-based band changed some of the landmarks named in the song for their version as they found the original ones hard to decipher.

== Reception ==
Professional ratings
Review scores
Source	Rating
AllMusic	4.5/5 stars
Pitchfork	8.1/10
Tiny Mix Tapes	4.5/5

AllMusic critic Jason Ankeny retrospectively lauded Come Out Come Out as "Cub's masterpiece, transcending the cutesy limitations of cuddlecore to create music of genuine originality and meaning." Deeming it the genre's "finest hour", he described the album as "buoyed by Ramones-like abandon but anchored by an ever-expanding melodic sophistication and lyrical depth", as well as "an emotional complexity ... which rejects the seeming naïveté of the band's music once and for all." While highlighting the band's musical progression, Ira Robbins of Trouser Press found that "ultimately, though, it's the lyrics – about crushes on girls, sexual roles, romantic disillusion and unfailing devotion – that give the album the weight intentionally absent from the breathless music." Writing for Pitchfork, Marc Hogan said that "Cub tighten up as a band still more for Come Out Come Out without losing their appealing simplicity, thanks in part to increasingly confident songwriting", observing that "where Betti-Cola seems assured of the modern ideal of romantic love, Come Out Come Out interjects playfully self-aware anxiety next to the giddiness of tra-la-la love songs like 'I'm Your Angel'."

== Track listing ==
All songs written by Cub, except where indicated.

1. "Ticket to Spain" – 2:27
2. "Everything's Geometry" – 2:37
3. "My Flaming Red Bobsled" – 2:04
4. "Isabelle" – 2:31
5. "Your Bed" – 1:40
6. "Tomorrow Go Away" – 3:19
7. "Life of Crime" – 2:25
8. "I'm Your Angel" (Yoko Ono cover) – 2:03
9. "Por Favor" – 1:29
10. "New York City" – 3:00
11. "Voracious" – 2:15
12. "So Far Apart" – 2:44
13. "Vacation" (The Go-Go's cover) – 2:15

2007 reissue bonus tracks

14. "Your Bed" (Yoyo version) – 1:37
15. "Cast a Shadow" ("Volcano" single version, live) (Beat Happening cover) – 4:33
16. "Radio Chinchilla" (Telephone version) – 3:00
17. "Go Fish" (Club mix) (unlisted) – 7:04
18. "Who Are You" (Answering Machine mix) (unlisted) – 0:28

== Personnel ==
Credits are adapted from the album's liner notes.

Cub

- Lisa Marr – vocals, bass, whistling (track 8)
- Lisa G. – drums, yelps and guitar (track 9), "tra-la-la's" (track 8)
- Robynn Iwata – guitar, backup vocals, drums (track 9)

Additional musicians

- Lorraine Finch – organ (track 2)
- Marc L'Espérance – yelps and maracas (track 9), tambourine (track 10)
- Kevin Rose – guitar (track 12)

Production

- Kevin Rose – production
- Marc L'Espérance – production, engineering
- Cub – production

Design

- Fiona Smyth – cover and disc artwork
- Curt Doughty – Ipso the Chair Chimp photograph
- Jen Softie – band photograph
- Robynn Iwata, Mint-O-Shank – booklet design
- Anthony, Bill, Greg Ontario, Lisa Marr, Lisa G., James Texas, Randy, Robynn Iwata, Yvette – collage photographs
