= Muerte del Toro =

Studio album by Huevos Rancheros
- Released: May 2, 2000
- Label: Mint Records

Muerte del Toro is the fourth studio album by Huevos Rancheros. It was released on May 2, 2000 on Mint Records on CD and translucent red vinyl.

== Track listing ==
All songs written by Brent J. Cooper, Tom Kennedy and Richie Lazarowich, except where noted.

1. "Diamond Head" (Hamilton)
2. "Beach Blanket Blackout"
3. "El Toro Muerto Con Queso"
4. "Bring Me The Beard Of Billy Gibbons"
5. "Super Creep"
6. "Ride, Cowboy"
7. "Wild Turkey Surprise"
8. "Trouble A Brewin'"
9. "Moondawg 2000" (Weaver)
10. "Dead By Sundown"
11. "Dust Devil"
12. "Head Smashed In Buffalo Jump"
