= Gerda Munsinger =

East German woman involved in Canadian sex scandal

Gerda Munsinger (born Gerda Hesler, Heseler or Hessler, also known as Olga Schmidt and Gerda Merkt; c. September 10, 1929 – November 24, 1998) was an East German woman and alleged Soviet spy (although these allegations were ultimately unproven). She immigrated to Canada in 1955. Munsinger was the central protagonist of the Munsinger Affair, the first national political sex scandal in Canada, and was dubbed "the Mata Hari of the Cold War" because of her involvement with several Canadian politicians. She returned to Germany in 1961, became the centre of press attention in 1966 when the scandal was publicly revealed, and was the subject of a feature film.

== Biography ==
Munsinger was born in Königsberg, East Prussia (modern Kaliningrad, Russia), on or around September 10, 1929. Little is definitively known of her early life. Her father was reported to be a member of the Communist Party of Germany, and was killed in 1943. She was drafted as a labour worker in 1944, around the same time that her younger brother mysteriously disappeared; she also lost contact with her mother and sister. In an interview she stated that she was until 1948 a prisoner in a "Russian concentration camp"; she also reported being raped by the Soviet soldiers who invaded Germany at the end of the Second World War. The Encyclopedia of Cold War Espionage notes that "there appeared to Western intelligence officers some indications" that Munsinger served as a Soviet spy during this period and that she at one time lived with a KGB officer. She crossed the border between East and West Germany on several occasions, and as a result was reportedly arrested for espionage by the American border police in 1949. Shortly thereafter, she began learning English and worked as a secretary in a hotel, where she provided secretarial services to American president Dwight Eisenhower and his wife.

She applied to emigrate to Canada in 1952, but was rejected because of security concerns; her attempt to enter the US in 1953 was similarly rejected, citing her espionage conviction and "moral turpitude". She was married for a short period to a demobilized American soldier and baseball player named Michael Munsinger, but divorced him in 1954 after she was unable to return to the US with him. However, she was able to emigrate to Montreal in 1955 under her married name aboard the Arosa Star, as the paperwork she completed did not require her to report her maiden name. She worked as a maid for a doctor in a Montreal suburb upon her arrival, in accordance with the terms of the contract she signed prior to departure. Once her term was completed, she found jobs as a waitress, a call girl, and a hostess at the "Chez Paree" nightclub; she also aspired to be a model.

=== Munsinger Affair ===
Munsinger became involved in relationships with a number of high-ranking Canadian government officials, most notably cabinet ministers George Hees and Pierre Sévigny. She later commented negatively about Hees, suggesting he was "an ex-football star and that's it" who was "too sure of himself as a man"; Sévigny, in contrast, she pitied, saying that newspaper reports about him and his family were "nothing but lies" and that "he was the most innocent person in the whole affair". Sévigny and Hees co-sponsored her application for Canadian citizenship in 1960.

The Royal Canadian Mounted Police (RCMP), after learning that the Central Intelligence Agency considered Munsinger to be a "definite security risk", interrogated her in 1960 and conducted surveillance on her telephone conversations. However, they found no evidence that she had engaged in spying in Canada. She was briefly hospitalized in 1960 and was believed to have leukemia. Munsinger was arrested for trying to cash a bad cheque in 1961 but the charges were dropped; she left shortly thereafter to return to Germany.

Under pressure from Prime Minister John Diefenbaker, who had been informed of the situation by the RCMP, Sévigny ended his affair with Munsinger. He resigned quietly from cabinet in 1963 during an election campaign.

The affair became public in March 1966 when Minister of Justice Lucien Cardin mentioned Munsinger's name during a debate in Parliament, in response to comments from the Conservatives about security problems in the Liberal government of Lester B. Pearson. The Liberals had been made aware of the affair two years earlier during a review of security cases involving senior government officials; Pearson had opted to not publicize it, and had instructed his cabinet ministers not to discuss it. The media heard about Cardin's comments in the House of Commons and began circulating rumours that "Monsignor" was a Québécois priest/mobster. Despite being told by Pearson not to say anything further, Cardin disclosed during a press conference that "Olga" Munsinger had been involved with Conservative politicians; he compared the incident to the affair between John Profumo and Christine Keeler in the UK. One news report later concluded that "a blond playgirl... has thrust Parliament into a state of suspended degradation".

When the issue was first raised, the government said that Gerda Munsinger had died of leukemia several years earlier. However, this turned out not to be the case. A Canadian reporter with the Toronto Star, Robert Reguly, found her alive and well in Munich, West Germany, after locating her phone number in a local phonebook. At that time, she was engaged to German businessman Ernst Wagner. She confirmed her sexual involvement with the Conservative cabinet ministers but denied participating in espionage. Reguly's actions in finding and interviewing Munsinger resulted in the first of his three National Newspaper Awards. After the story broke, the police were sent by the German government to guard Munsinger's apartment and prevent unauthorized access, as a crowd of reporters camped outside for several days. One German reporter posed as a waiter and paid the owner of the restaurant in Munsinger's building to allow him access to her room. Several days later, she gave her first television interview, to CBC's Norman DePoe.

A judicial inquiry regarding the politicians' dalliances with Munsinger found that there had been no security leak resulting from the affair. Munsinger received "over a hundred" letters from Canadians expressing sympathy for the affair.

=== Later life ===
In 1974, Barbara Frum asked that Munsinger return to Canada for an exclusive interview with CBC Television. Larry Zolf, a journalist who had been caned on-camera by Sévigny in 1966 while attempting to question him about the affair, was tasked with locating her and bringing her to the show. He "snuck her into the Pearson International Airport from where [he] conveniently tipped off the Toronto Star", prompting a headline announcing her return. In the interview, Munsinger noted that "as far as I'm concerned, it wasn't a scandal, it was just life" but that "people know better by now" than to become involved in such affairs while in office. She also ridiculed the suggestion that she was a spy and suggested that Pierre Trudeau would have been better able to manage the scandal than Pearson.

Munsinger eventually married for a third time. She spent the rest of her life in relative obscurity under the name Gerda Merkt, and died on November 24, 1998, in Munich.

She had planned to write an autobiography, to be titled To Whom it may Concern, but this work was never published.

== Legacy ==
Munsinger's story inspired Canadian writer and director Brenda Longfellow to create the 1992 feature film Gerda. The story also inspired the song "Gerda", written by the Canadian band The Brothers-in-Law who "specialized in taking satirical musical jabs at Canadian scandals and events". Similarly, The Evaporators included a song titled "Gerda Munsinger" on their album Ripple Rock.

A 1997 article in the Vancouver Sun suggested that the elimination of capital punishment in Canada was a direct result of Pearson's desire to direct Canadian attention away from Munsinger.

Munsinger was briefly profiled by Disclosure, a CBC TV program, in 2001. According to a friend interviewed for the program, Gerda had remarked before her death that "one day, Canadians will again come looking for me".
