= Sled Island Music and Arts Festival =

Annual music festival in Calgary, Canada

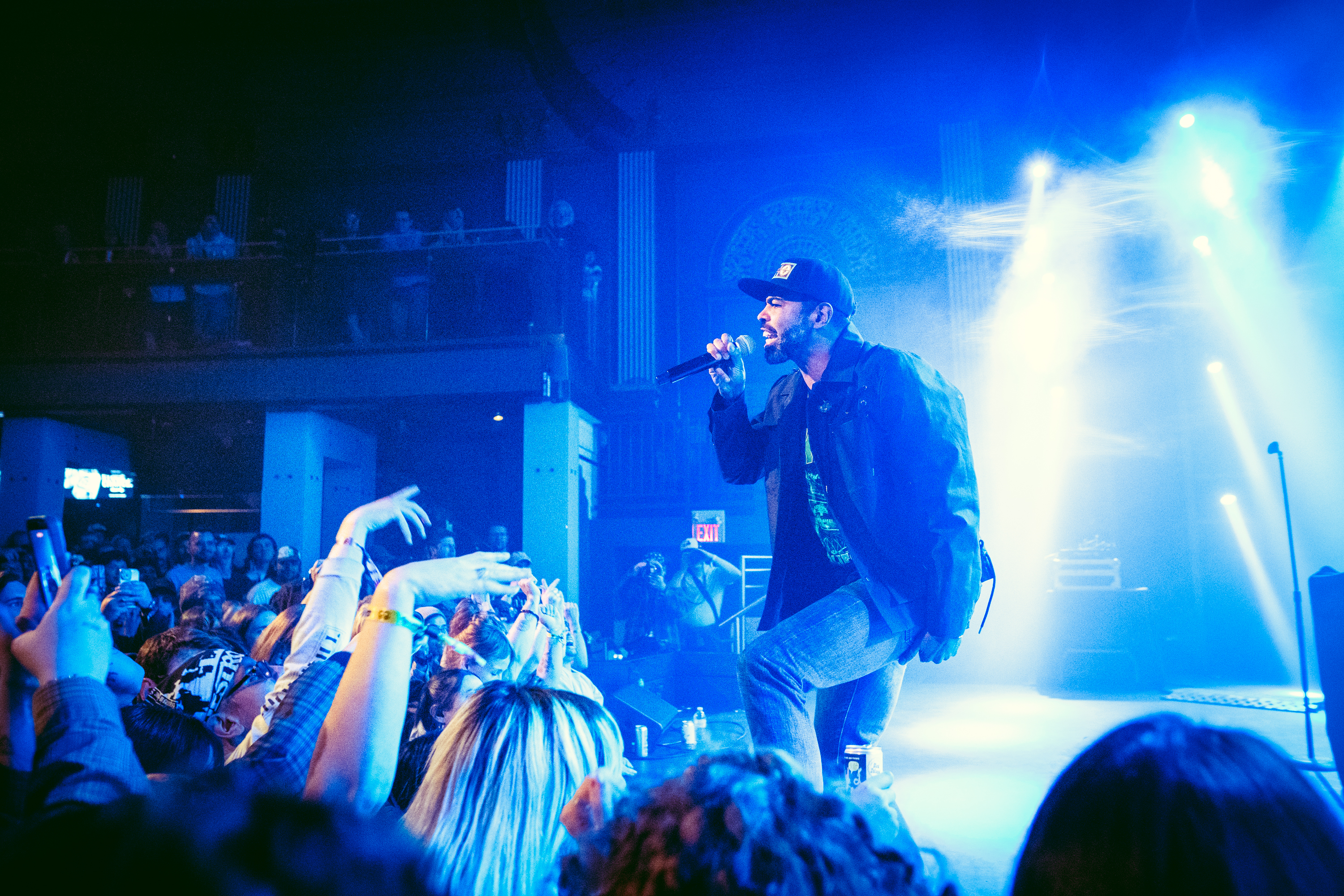
clipping. at Sled Island 2026. Photo: Blake McLeod

The Sled Island Music & Arts Festival is an annual independent music and arts festival formed in 2007 and held in Calgary, Alberta, Canada. Each June, the five-day festival showcases over 200 bands, artists, and comedians as well as over 25,000 attendees in multiple venues across the city. Each year, Sled Island selects a guest curator to help set the direction and tone of the festival through specialized programming choices and with their presence at the event. Past guest curators have included clipping. (2026) Otoboke Beaver (2025), Show Me the Body (2024), Bartees Strange (2023), Sudan Archives (2022), Julien Baker (2019), Deerhoof (2018), Flying Lotus (2017), Peaches (2016), Godspeed You! Black Emperor (2015), Kathleen Hanna (2014), John Dwyer (2013), Tim Hecker (2013), Andrew W.K. (2012), Danny Vacon (2012), Grant Lawrence (2011), Bogus Tokus (2011), Fucked Up (2010), King Khan (2010), Quintron & Miss Pussycat (2010), Colin Newman (2009), Scott Kannberg (2008) and Mark Andrew Hamilton of Woodpigeon (band) (2007).

== Background Information ==
=== 2007 ===
Sled Island's inaugural year ran from June 27–30, 2007, featuring 96 bands and guest curator Mark Hamilton of Woodpigeon. Over 6000 people attended. The festival placed local musicians (Woodpigeon, Chad VanGaalen, Hot Little Rocket, S.I.D.S., etc.) alongside international musicians (Boredoms, Cat Power, Spoon, The Walkmen etc.). A variety of visual art events and film screenings complimented the music lineup.

=== 2008 ===
The second edition of Sled Island ran from June 25–28, 2008, featuring guest music curator Scott Kannberg of the seminal indie band Pavement. The full festival lineup included: Mogwai, Of Montreal, Wire, RZA, Broken Social Scene, Tegan and Sara, Grizzly Bear, Yo La Tengo, Drive-by Truckers, José González, Extra Golden, Gutter Twins, Beans, Jonathan Richman, Chris Gheran, The Dodos, Deerhunter, Okkervil River, BBQ, Women, No Age, Dan Deacon, Qui, Pride Tiger, Wet Secrets, Carolyn Mark, Elliot Brood, Portastatic, Scott Kannberg, Whitsundays, Woodpigeon, Mother Mother, Broken West, Chad VanGaalen and more.

The 2008 festival saw an increased focus on visual art, with 15 exhibitions including works from Peaches, Noam Gonick, Luis Jacob, Paulo Whitaker, Wil Murray, Justin Evans, Miriam Bankey, Chris Millar, Dave & Jenn, Ryan Sluggett, Kyle Beal, Kim Neudorf and Patrick Lundeen. Organizers held a poster contest aimed at high school students to get them more involved in the festival.

=== 2009 ===
The third edition of Sled Island ran from June 24–27, 2009. Colin Newman of the British post-punk band Wire and Githead acted as guest curator. The lineup featured over 250 artists, including 90+ local bands. Headliners included The Breeders, Liars, Andrew W.K., Health, Chris Gheran, Shearing Pinx, Final Fantasy, Githead, Holy Fuck, Anvil, The Bronx, Monotonix, Women, Slim Twig, The King Khan & BBQ Show, Quintron & Miss Pussycat, Braids, Mount Eerie, Biz Markie, Azeda Booth, Jody Glenham, Puberty, Friendo, Knots, Nü Sensae and more.

=== 2010 ===
The fourth edition of Sled Island ran from June 30 – July 3, 2010 with the Sled Island Film component running from June 24–29, 2010. Headliners included Girl Talk, Melvins, Built to Spill, The Thermals, Les Savy Fav, Hot Water Music, The Pack A.D., WhoMadeWho, The Black Lips, Kobra and the Lotus, Hot Panda, Ted Leo and The Pharmacists, The Posies, The Almighty Defenders, Fucked Up, Quintron and Miss Pussycat, !!!, King Khan & BBQ Show, Deerhoof, The Bronx, Chain & The Gang, Women, Azeda Booth, Aislinn Grant, In Medias Res and more.

=== 2011 ===
The fifth edition of Sled Island ran from June 22–25, 2011. Headliners included Sleep, Twin Shadow, Minus The Bear, An Horse, The Sword, Blonde Redhead, Dum Dum Girls, Wild Flag, Of Montreal, Buzzcocks, Lee Ranaldo, Zola Jesus, Deer Tick, Dandy Warhols, Crocodiles, Quintron, BJ Snowden, Wild Nothing, Kurt Vile, Chad VanGaalen, Purity Ring, and more.

=== 2012 ===
The sixth edition of Sled Island took place from June 20–23, 2012. Headliners included Feist, The Hold Steady, Archers of Loaf, Andrew W.K., The Sadies, Thurston Moore, Shadowy Men on a Shadowy Planet, The Antlers, Lou Barlow, Hot Snakes and more.

=== 2013 ===
The seventh edition of Sled Island was scheduled to run from June 19–22, 2013, but was cancelled on the morning of June 21, 2013 because of historic flooding in Calgary that resulted in the evacuation of many neighbourhoods and the closure of significant portions of the city. Headliners were to include The Jesus and Mary Chain, Explosions in the Sky, Swans, Divine Fits, Joel Plaskett, Iceage, Superchunk, Torche, The Thermals, Mac DeMarco, Colin Stetson, Metz, Tim Hecker, The Besnard Lakes and Thee Oh Sees.

=== 2014 ===
The eighth edition of Sled Island ran from June 18–22, 2014. Headliners included Spiritualized, Rocket From The Crypt, St. Vincent, Bob Mould, Joel Plaskett Emergency, Touche Amore, Killer Mike, Earthless, Rhye, Chelsea Wolfe, Dan Deacon and more.

=== 2015 ===
The ninth edition of Sled Island ran from June 24–28, 2015 and was guest curated by Godspeed You! Black Emperor. Headliners included Godspeed You! Black Emperor, Television, Drive Like Jehu, Lightning Bolt, Body/Head, Daniel Lanois, King Tuff, Fu Manchu, Viet Cong, Sturle Dagsland, Pissed Jeans and more.

=== 2016 ===
The tenth anniversary of Sled Island ran from June 22–26, 2016 and was guest curated by Peaches. Headliners included Guided by Voices, Deafheaven, The Sonics, Angel Olsen, Built to Spill, Julia Holter, Tortoise, Oneida, Protomartyr, Psychic TV and more.

=== 2017 ===
The eleventh edition of Sled Island took place June 21–25, 2017 and was guest curated by Flying Lotus. Headliners included Cloud Nothings, Low, Converge, Waxahatchee, Silver Apples, Wolves in the Throne Room, Weyes Blood, Hailu Mergia, Land of Talk, Mothers, MONO, Pyramid//Indigo, Thor & Friends, Daughters, New Fries, EX EYE and more.

=== 2018 ===
The twelfth edition of Sled Island took place from June 20–24, 2018. The year's guest curator was none other than San Francisco's Deerhoof. Headliners included Dirty Projectors, John Maus, Mount Eerie, Grouper, Lido Pimienta, Wye Oak, Shabazz Palaces, Cherry Glazerr, Tyondai Braxton, Guerilla Toss, Eucademix (Yuka Honda of Cibo Matto), Ufomammut, Synkro, 40 Watt Sun (featuring Patrick Walker of Warning), The Body, Oren Ambarchi & Will Guthrie, Wand, Bat Fangs (members of Ex Hex and Flesh Wounds), and many more.

=== 2019 ===
The thirteenth edition of Sled Island took place from June 19–23, 2019. The 2019 guest curator was Julien Baker. Headliners included: Japanese Breakfast, JPEGMafia, Bully, Oblivians, The Messthetics (members of Fugazi), Fly Pan Am, Lubomyr Melnyk, Torres, The Comet Is Coming, Kid Congo Powers + The Pink Monkeybirds, and more.

=== 2020 ===
The 2020 edition of the festival was cancelled due to the ongoing COVID-19 pandemic.

=== 2021 ===
The 2021 edition of the festival was again cancelled due to the ongoing COVID-19 pandemic. In an effort to have a safe, scaled-down event, they introduced Camp Sled Island - a three-day, in-person event primarily featuring video programming, which ran August 19–21 at Beltline's High Park. This included pre-recorded performances, film screenings, special guest video appearances, and animated shorts displayed on a big screen, as well as a live music pre-show each night.

=== 2022 ===
The 2022 edition of the festival took place June 22–26, 2022 and was guest curated by Sudan Archives. Guests included Princess Nokia, Built to Spill, Grouper, Joyce Manor, Low, Alex Cameron, SASAMI, Lydia Lunch RETROVIRUS, Primitive Man, Lavender Country, and many more.

=== 2023 ===
The 2023 edition of the festival took place June 21–25, 2023 and was guest curated by Bartees Strange. Other headliners included Osees, Dehd, Sun Ra Arkestra, Helado Negro, Akintoye, Emma Ruth Rundle, Mannequin Pussy, Amindi, Vivek Shraya, Haviah Mighty, and many more.

=== 2024 ===
The 2024 edition of the festival took place June 19–23, 2024 and was guest curated by Show Me the Body. Other headliners included Mick Jenkins, Cherry Glazerr, EKKSTACY, Kari Faux, Planet Giza, W.I.T.C.H., Juana Molina, Wombo, Soul Glo, Tomb Mold, Jeff Parker, and many more.

=== 2025 ===
The 2025 edition of the festival took place June 18–22, 2025 and was guest curated by Otoboke Beaver. Other acts included Yaya Bey, TOPS, Tropical Fuck Storm, Zola Jesus, Oddisee & Good Compny, Horse Jumper of Love, Xiu Xiu, Baths, Sofie Royer, Mary Lattimore, Makaya McCraven, Kara-Lis Coverdale, The Mummies, Peelander-Z, and many more.

=== 2026 ===
The 2026 edition of the festival took place June 17-21, 2026 and was guest curated by clipping. Other acts included Black Country, New Road, HOMESHAKE, billy woods, Sextile, Lil Mariko, feeble little horse, illuminati hotties, Snõõper, Laraaji, Palehound, Salami Rose Joe Louis, Backxwash, Etran De L'Aïr, Thor Harris, Robert Aiki Aubrey Lowe, and many more.

== See also ==
- List of festivals in Calgary
