= Ear of the Dragon =

Compilation album
- Released: 15 May 1995
- Recorded: 1993–1995
- Genre: Indie rock
- Language: English
- Label: Fortune 5
- Producers: Ben Kim, Sooyoung Park, William Shin
- Compiler: Sooyoung Park

Professional ratings
Review scores
Source	Rating
Allmusic	(not rated, no review) link
Entertainment Weekly	(B) link

Ear of the Dragon (1995) is a CD album released on the Fortune 5 label in collaboration with A Magazine. It is a compilation of tracks by American and Canadian indie bands which contained Asian-American members. The album contains a broad range of American indie music styles and notable indie artists from the early to mid 1990s including indie rock (Versus and The Dambuilders), punk (J Church and aMiniature), ska punk (Skankin' Pickle), slowcore (Seam), cuddlecore (cub), and key players in post-rock (David Pajo was a member of Slint and both he and Bundy K. Brown (a.k.a. Slowpoke) were members of seminal post-rock band Tortoise).

== Track listing ==
The track running order listed on the CD cover is incorrect-the list below shows the actual running order of the CD.

1. Signer's Strut - aMiniature
2. Losing My Cool - Yanti Arifin
3. Reveille - Versus
4. Tossing Pearls - Venus Cures All
5. Hey Latasha - Seam
6. Day into Night - Dolomite
7. Live for Yourself - Kicking Giant
8. Your King - Team Xiaoping
9. Secret Nothing - cub
10. The Naked City - Cartographers
11. Smooth Control - The Dambuilders
12. Perfect World - Mint Aundry
13. Heavens to Betsy - Chumley
14. I Would for You - J Church
15. Pabu Boy - Skankin' Pickle
16. Mr. Onion #2 - Slowpoke
17. It's About Time - Azure
18. She - Squash Blossom
19. Undiu - David Pajo Band

== Tour ==
Some of the bands represented on this compilation (including Seam, aMiniature, Venus Cures All, Cub and Versus) toured together in support of the "Ear of the Dragon" compilation in 1995. This tour included major US and Canadian cities including Toronto, Los Angeles, New York City and Chicago. According to Billboard Magazine, the tour began April 28, 1995 in Toronto and ended May 27, 1995 in Chicago.
