= Huevos Rancheros (band) =

Canadian surf rock band

- Origin: Calgary, Alberta, Canada
- Genres: Punk rock; surf; rockabilly
- Years active: 1990–2000
- Labels: C/Z (1992–1995); Mint (1995–2000)
- Past members: Brent Cooper; Tommy Kennedy; Richie Ranchero; Graham Evans

Huevos Rancheros were a Canadian surf rock band from Calgary, Alberta, active from 1990 to 2000. Huevos Rancheros performed an instrumental blend of rockabilly, surf, garage, and punk music.

== History ==
Initially consisting of guitarist Brent Cooper, bassist Graham Evans and drummer Richie Ranchero, Huevos Rancheros released the six-song EP Huevosaurus independently in 1990 before releasing the EP Rocket to Nowhere in 1991 on Estrus Records. In its early years the band was sometimes described as a cross between Led Zeppelin and The Ventures.

The band then signed to C/Z Records, which reissued Huevosaurus in 1992 before releasing the band's full-length album Endsville in 1993.

In 1995, the band signed to Mint Records. Around the same time, Evans left the band and was replaced by Tom Kennedy. The band's instrumental rock record Dig In was released that year.

In 1998, their album Get Outta Dodge was nominated for a Juno Award in the Best Alternative Album category.

After touring in Europe with Duotang, in 2000 the band released the album Muerte del Toro. They broke up soon after, although they have performed occasional reunion shows at benefit concerts to raise money for a journalism scholarship named in memory of former Calgary Herald music critic James Muretich. The reunion show lineup has featured Evans rather than Kennedy on bass.

Cooper went on to found The Ramblin' Ambassadors, a three-piece instrumental band.

== Band members ==
=== Original lineup ===
- Brent J. Cooper - guitar
- Graham Evans - bass
- Richie Lazarowich - drums, percussion

=== 2nd lineup ===
- Brent J. Cooper - guitar
- Tom Kennedy - bass
- Richie Lazarowich - drums, percussion

=== 3rd lineup ===
- Brent J. Cooper - guitar
- Keith Rose - bass
- Richie Lazarowich - drums, percussion

== Discography ==
=== EPs ===
- Huevosaurus (1990; reissued on C/Z Records in 1992)
- Rocket to Nowhere (1991)
- The Wedge (Mint Records, 1999)

=== Albums ===
- Endsville (C/Z Records, 1993)
- Dig In! (Mint Records, 1995)
- Longo Weekendo Fiesta (Lucky Records, 1995)
- Get Outta Dodge (Mint Records, 1996)
- Muerte del Toro (Mint Records, 2000)

== See also ==
- Music of Canada
- Canadian rock
- List of Canadian musicians
