= In Medias Res (band) =

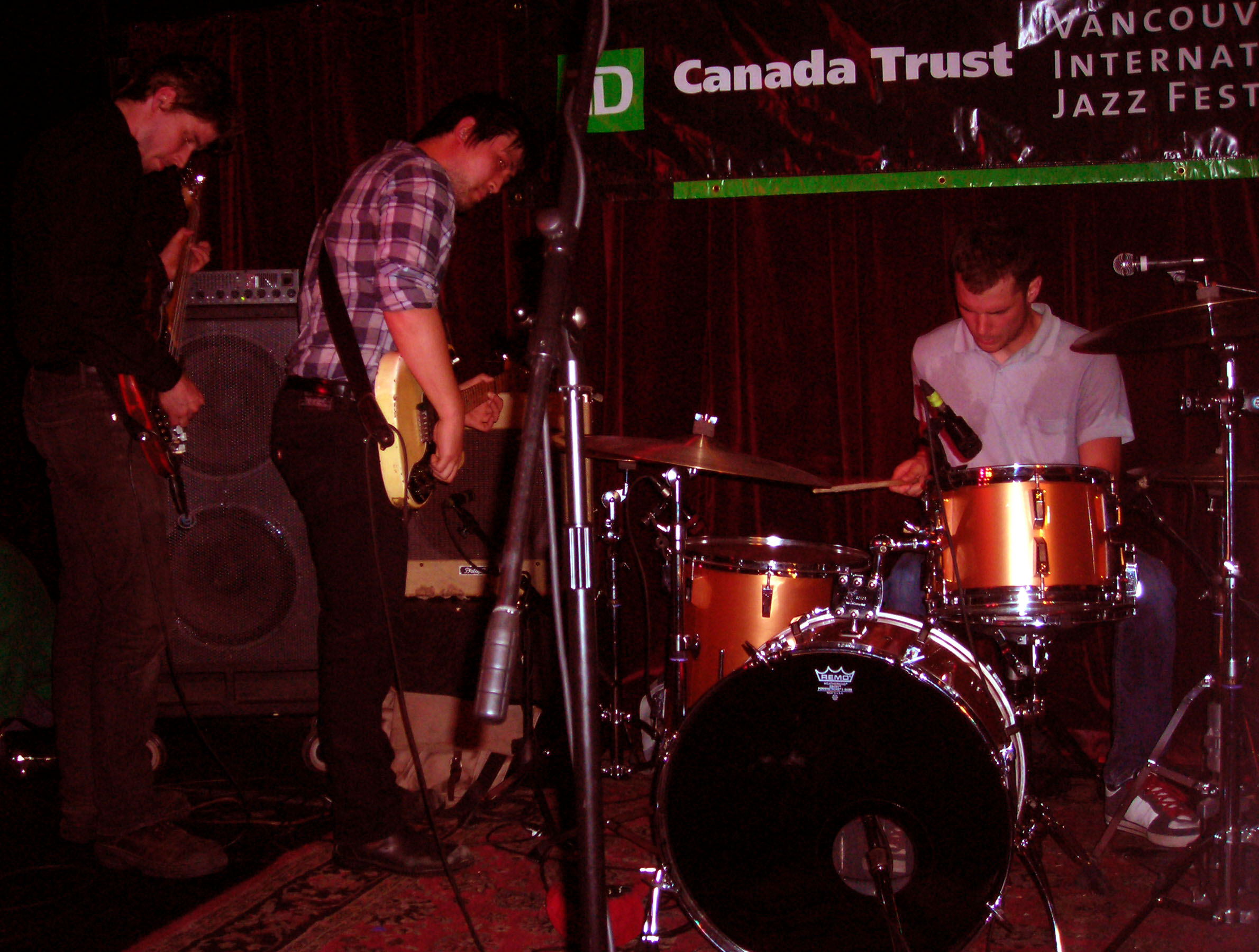
- Ryan Flowers, Andrew Lee and Steve Watts at the Media Club in Vancouver in June 2009.

Background information
- Also known as: IMR
- Origin: Vancouver, British Columbia, Canada
- Genres: Indie rock, post-rock
- Years active: 1999–present
- Labels: Anniedale, File Under: Music, Heavy Lark
- Members: Andrew Lee; Ash Poon; Ryan Flowers; Robert Tornroos
- Past members: Steve Watts
- Website: inmediasres.bandcamp.com

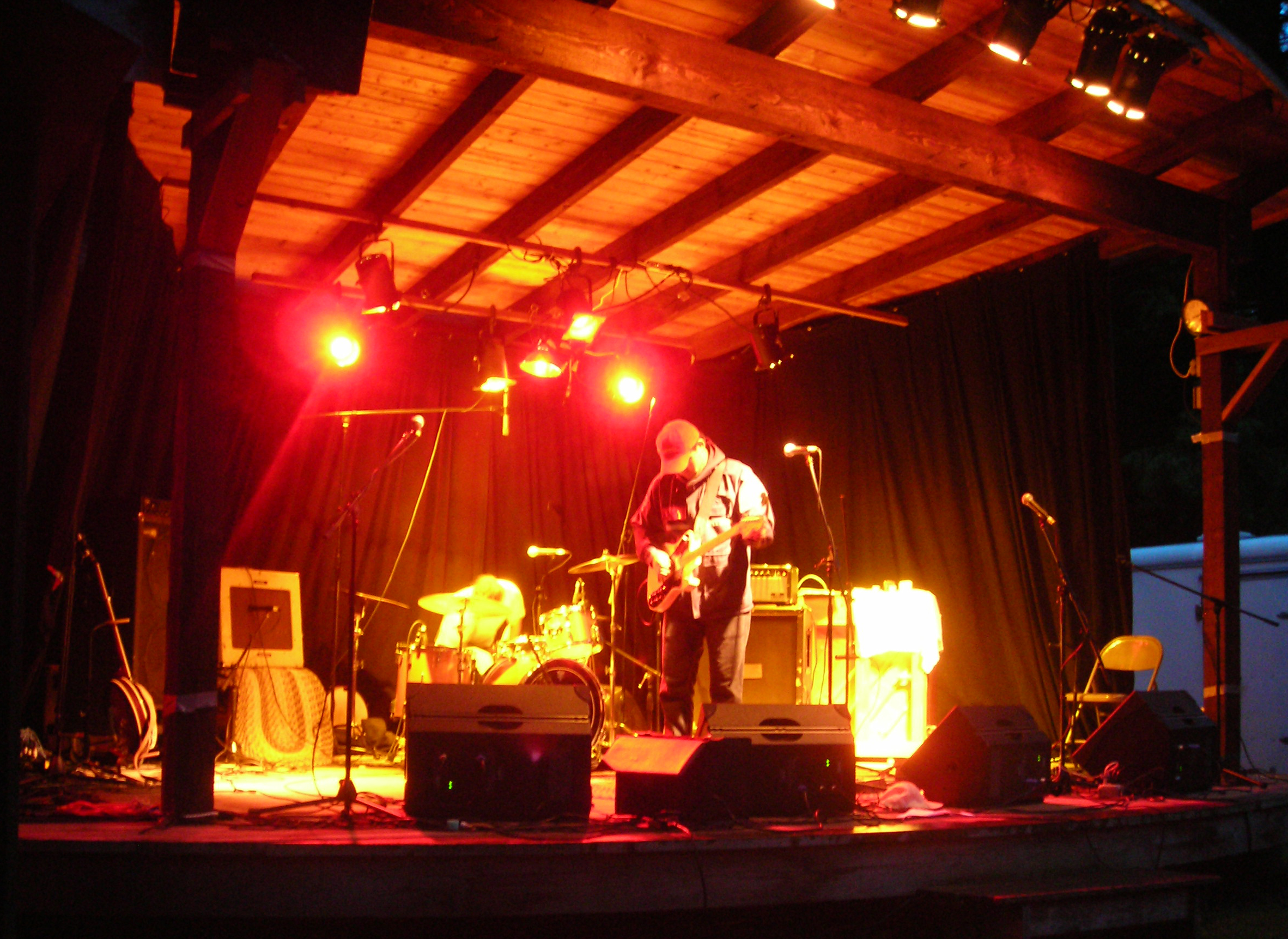
Lead singer Andrew Lee at the 2007 Woodsong Festival on Orcas Island, Washington.

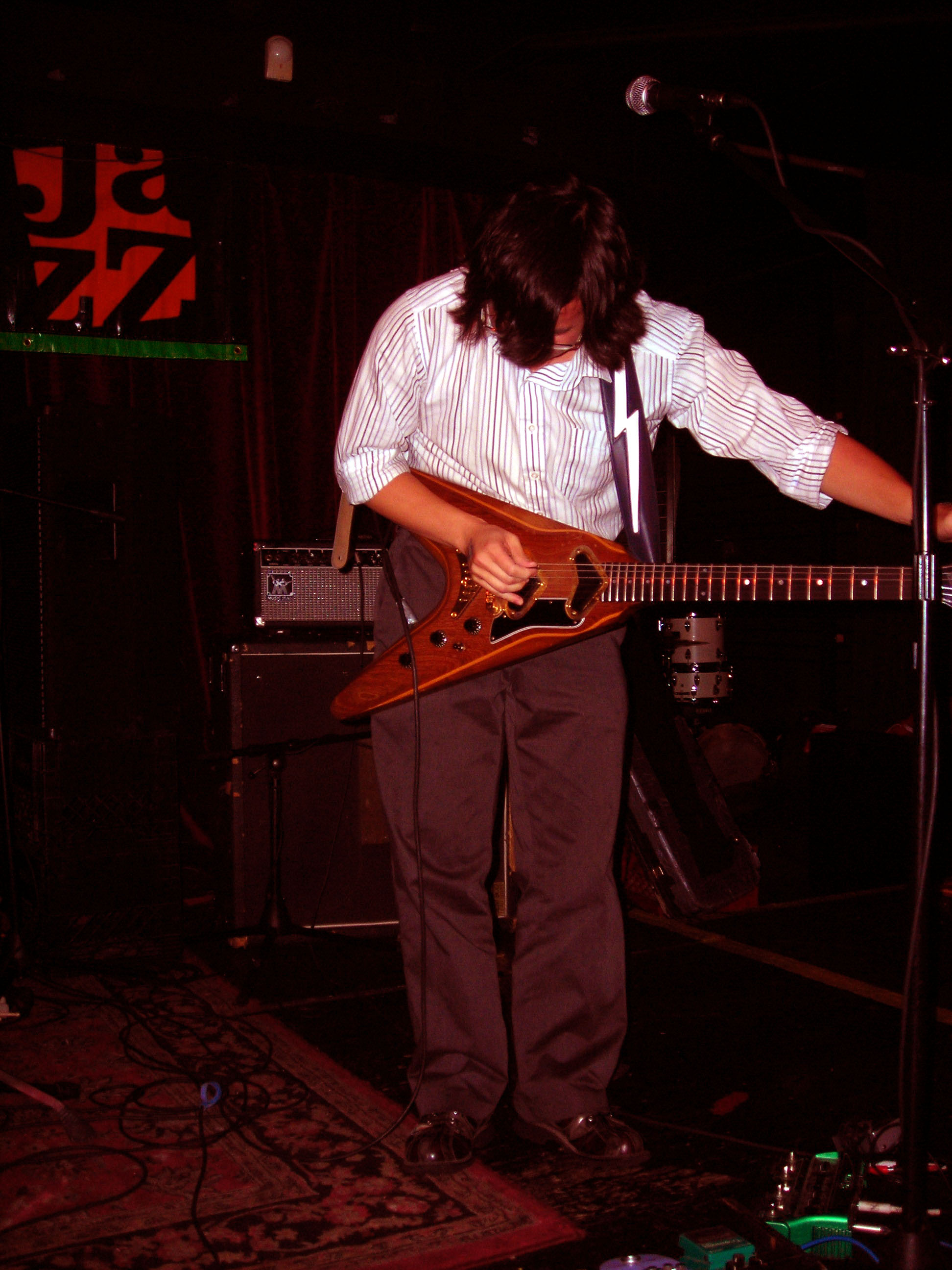
Lead guitarist Ash Poon during a show at the Media Club in Vancouver in June 2009.

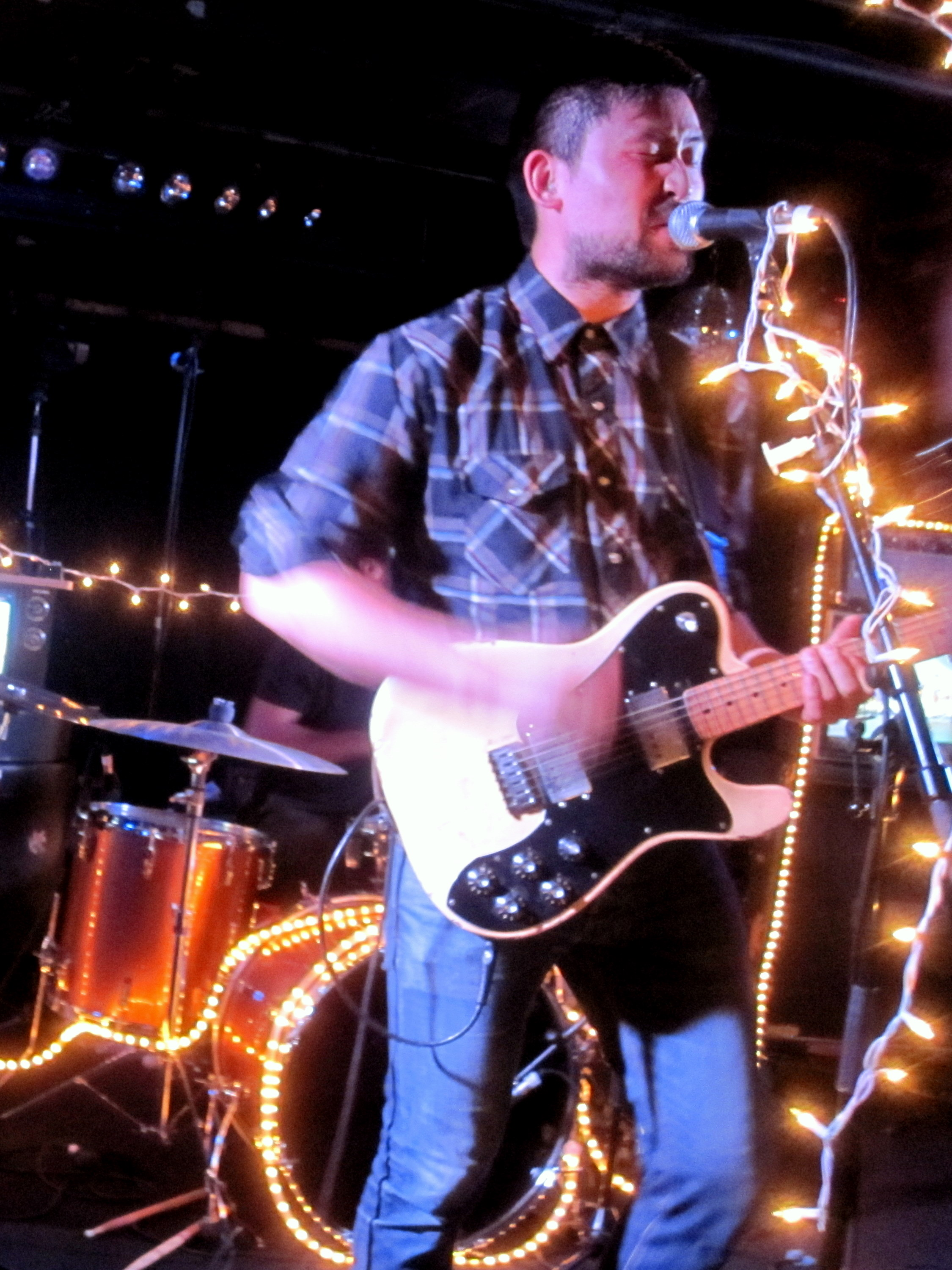
Lead singer Andrew Lee at It Was Warm and Sunny's album release show at the Biltmore Cabaret in Vancouver (July 16, 2011).

In Medias Res (also known as IMR) is an indie rock band from Vancouver, British Columbia, Canada. The band consists of Andrew Lee (lead vocals and guitar), Ash Poon (lead guitar), Ryan Flowers (bass), and Robert Tornroos (drums). The band's original drummer, Steve Watts, left in 2011. After forming in 1999, In Medias Res have released one EP and two full-length albums, Of What Was (2003) and It Was Warm and Sunny When We First Set Out (2011). They have been categorized in the media as alternative, post-rock and math rock, while being stylistically compared to such bands as Pedro the Lion, Radiohead, and TV on the Radio.

== Background ==
Prior to the In Medias Res' formation, Lee and Poon played in a band with the latter's older brother and another bassist. They won a Battle of the Bands show at Lee's high school, competing against another group that Flowers and Tornroos played in (Lee, Flowers, and Tornroos attended the same high school). After Poon's brother left town, Watts joined the band, having known the group's members from summer camp. Playing out of a church basement, In Medias Res formed in 1999. A year later, Flowers replaced the band's original bassist.

The band's name, frequently misspelled or mispronounced in the media and at shows, is a literary term referring to a narrative that begins in the rising action portion of a story; translated from Latin, it means "in the middle of things." Poon has explained that the band "chose the name because the middle is where the real story is, like our music."

During the band's early years, they all lived separately in Richmond, British Columbia, with the exception of Watts, who resided in nearby Surrey. Watts has recalled wanting to quit at one point in the band's beginning stages until they played a show in 2000 with Seattle indie band Pedro the Lion, a band they grew up idolizing. Poon has further identified opening for Pedro the Lion as a turning point in the band's career, commenting "It...let us know that we could make this a viable musical endeavor." The show was held at Trinity Western University, where the band played regularly and subsequently developed much of their early fan base.

Early self-proclaimed musical influences include Pedro the Lion, the Appleseed Cast, and Radiohead, while Lee has cited Scottish poet Robert Burns as a lyrical inspiration.

== Studio releases ==
After selling out 500 copies of their second EP, Intimacy, In Medias Res independently released Of What Was, their first full-length album, in April 2003 to favourable local reviews. Distributed by Vancouver's Scratch Records, In Medias Res sold out their initial 1,000 copies of the album within a year-and-a-half, before re-releasing it under local label Anniedale Records on May 24, 2005. (By the time of their next full-length release in January 2011, Of What Was sold over 2,000 copies.)

Watts has described the album as a turning point in the band's musical identity, referring to their previous work as more characteristic of their collective stylistic taste in such bands as Pedro the Lion and Radiohead. It was produced by Jonathan Anderson of Jonathan Inc., a fellow Vancouver indie act, who In Medias Res has worked and performed with extensively.

Following their debut LP's re-release under Anniedale, In Medias Res took six years to put forth their next effort, sparking rumours of the band's dissolution during the period in between. Lee later commented on the band's seeming hiatus, stating that they were in "too comfortable" a state that "didn't require [them] to push." He added that "We had to field all kinds of rumours as people wondered if were still together, which didn't help the situation that was brewing internally." In 2006, an article featuring an interview with In Medias Res stated that the band was working on new material. Leading up to their second LP, the band made a new 11-minute track entitled "The Dark Crystal" available for download on Bandcamp.com. Released on December 15, 2010, the band allowed the track to be purchased on a name-your-price basis. "The Dark Crystal" was recorded Mushroom Studios (Vancouver) in 2008 and featured cover art re-appropriated from a Norwegian photographer. Watt declared it in an earlier interview as "one of the best pieces [they have] ever written/recorded."

The following month, nearly eight years after the initial release of their first LP, In Medias Res digitally self-released It Was Warm And Sunny When We First Set Out on January 4, 2011. The 10-track album was recorded primarily at Mushroom Studios and Sapphire Sound in Vancouver, while being produced once more by Jonathan Anderson, who also contributed vocals and instrumentals for the album, as well as Dave Carswell and John Collins. Positively reviewed by local publications, including The Georgia Straight and The Vancouver Sun, the album was categorized as post-rock, yielding "atypical pop song structures" and stylistic comparisons to Radiohead and Coldplay. Tracks "Final Flight of the Bees", "This Could Be The One", and "Tonight I Am New" were consistently singled out as album highlights by reviewers. On June 23, In Medias Res signed with Vancouver label File Under: Music, facilitating the hard-copy release of It Was Warm and Sunny 18 days later. Several months later, in October 2011, they released a music video for "Hollis", the eighth track on the album. A second music video was released in conjunction with their March 2012 tour for "This Could Be The One". Produced by Flowers, the video featured a friend of the band, Jimmy Leung, bodybuilding.

Following drummer Steve Watts' departure from the band (in order to pursue his studies in Scotland; he was replaced by Robert Tornroos), In Medias Res began to experiment with a more ambient sound. Featuring a lap steel guitar, keyboard, and synthesized beats, the band released Variations on March 3, 2012. The two-track EP contained re-arrangements of "Come Back Down" and "The Dark Crystal". It was recorded live off the floor at Buena Vista Studios (Vancouver) by Anderson.

Two years after It Was Warm and Sunny, the band released "The Center", a track intended for the second LP, but was ultimately left out.

== Live performances and touring ==
In Medias Res is known for their energetic live performances. After playing a show in a smaller-sized Vancouver venue in February 2011, a concert review declared that the location "could not contain the band's intense sound." Lead guitarist Ash Poon is known to have his eyeglasses fall off of his face, or to inadvertently break his strings as a byproduct of the band's on-stage movement and intensity. Lee's voice has been described in live performances as "broken", yet "emotive". In the years between their first two LPs, they have refined their setlist for acoustic and symphonic arrangements to perform as an alternative to their usual shows. The re-arranged songs, complemented by a violin and cello, are not available on any studio recordings, however.

Aside from playing local venues in Vancouver, In Medias Res has toured throughout North America. In the band's early years, they played shows around Western Canada, travelling as far as Winnipeg, Manitoba, on two occasions. In 2005, they embarked on a three-month, North American tour, supporting Of What Was's re-release under Anniedale Records. Spanning from May 21 to July 17, the tour featured 42 dates, including a hometown show at the Pacific Coliseum.

After releasing It Was Warm and Sunny under File Under: Music in July 2011, In Medias Res announced a month-long, 12-date Canadian tour, beginning with a show in Vancouver. While the majority of the tour took place in Ontario, there were dates in Saskatchewan and Alberta, as well. During a stop in Lethbridge, Alberta, on August 2, the band was featured on Global Lethbridge's Scene and Heard segment. After returning from their tour, Lee and Flowers performed in support of their album on Global BC's Morning News Café on August 22. The band embarked on another tour beginning in mid-November for what was planned to be a month-long, ten-stop circuit in the Pacific Northwest. It was stopped short in early-December when Lee's father was diagnosed with terminal thyroid cancer. The band cancelled their remaining tour dates as Lee travelled to Regina, Saskatchewan, to be with his father in the hospital. While in Regina, he recorded an acoustic version of "Come Back Down", a track from It Was Warm and Sunny, in the hospital parking lot. The track was offered online by donation with all proceeds going to Lee's family. Several months later, the band returned to the road with a 16-stop North American tour in March 2012.

In Medias Res has also participated in such annual summer festivals as the Woodsong Arts and Music Festival in Orcas Island, Washington, and Sled Island in Calgary, Alberta. They have shared the stage with such notable acts as Pedro the Lion/David Bazan, Stabilo, Damien Jurado, Emery, Delirious?, Death From Above 1979, Rosie Thomas, You Say Party! We Say Die!, and Ladyhawk.

== Personal lives ==
Providing a background for Lee's lyrics is his education in writing and philosophy, which he received at Capilano College in North Vancouver and Simon Fraser University in Burnaby, British Columbia. Flowers also attended both Capilano and Simon Fraser, studying film; he has produced short films that have played at the Toronto International Film Festival. Poon, meanwhile, has worked as a radio producer. After graduating with a Master's in theology at Regent College in Vancouver (on the University of British Columbia's campus), Watts left the band following It Was Warm and Sunny's release to further pursue his education in Scotland.

== Discography ==
EP

- Intimacy (2002)
- Amo Audio (2006)
- The Dark Crystal (2010)
- Variations (2012)^{a}
- The Center (2013)

Full-length

- Of What Was (2003)^{b}
- It Was Warm and Sunny When We First Set Out (2011)^{c}

^{a}Digitally self-released on March 6, 2012, through Bandcamp.com
^{b}Self-released on July 8, 2003, and re-released under Anniedale Records on May 24, 2005.
^{c}Digitally self-released on January 4, 2011, and re-released under File Under: Music on June 12, 2011.
