= Of What Was =

Studio album by in medias res
- Released: May 24, 2005 (originally self-released on July 8, 2003)
- Recorded: in medias res
- Genre: Indie rock
- Label: Anniedale
- Producer: Jonathan Anderson

In medias res chronology
Intimacy	Of What Was (2005)	It Was Warm and Sunny When We First Set Out (2011)

Of What Was is the first full-length album by in medias res, an indie rock band from Vancouver, British Columbia. Produced by fellow Vancouver indie act Jonathan Anderson, it was originally self-released on July 8, 2003 and sold out of its initial 1,000 copies within a year and a half. Of What Was was then picked up by Anniedale Records and re-released on May 24, 2005. The album was preceded by two EPs, Demos and Intimacy.

== Track listing ==
1. "Idée Fixe" - 2:57
2. "Radio Friendly" - 2:41^{a}
3. "Shakeher" - 3:46
4. "A Cause For Concern" - 5:41
5. "You Know You Don't Know" - 5:47
6. "Best Kept Secret" - 4:20
7. "Assembly Lines" - 5:35
8. "Annadonia" - 5:24
9. "Tail End of a Car Crash" - 0:55
10. "Of What Was" — 7:31
11. "Silence Calls" - 6:24
12. "Silence Calls" - 22:13^{b}

^{a} Originally titled "Wise Investors" in the self-released version.
^{b} Added in the Anniedale Records re-release.
