= Bella (Canadian band) =

Canadian indie pop band

- Origin: Vancouver, British Columbia, Canada
- Genres: Indie pop
- Years active: 2003–2011
- Labels: Mint, Hideout Records
- Members: Cameron Fraser; Tiffany Garrett Sotomayor; Charla McCutcheon; Matt Hutchings

Bella was a Canadian indie pop band from Vancouver, active from 2003 to 2011.

== History ==
=== Pretty Mess ===
Initially, the band consisted of Cameron Fraser (guitar, bass, keyboards, vocals), Tiffany Garrett Sotomayor (drums, guitar, vocals), Matt Hutchings (guitar, keyboards, vocals) and Charla McCutcheon (keyboards). In 2004, they released their debut album, Pretty Mess, which was recorded in Fraser's bedroom but mixed by Colin Stewart. Tom Harrison of The Province compared the band's sound to 1980s bands Martha and the Muffins and Altered Images. Music from this album was featured on CBC Radio 3 and on MuchMusic.

=== No One Will Know ===
Bella was signed to Mint Records, and the second album, No One Will Know, produced by David Carswell and with contributions from Roddy Bottum (Faith No More), Will Schwartz (Imperial Teen), John Collins (the New Pornographers) and Jason Martin (Starflyer 59, was released in 2007. It received mostly positive reviews from music critics. In a favourable review of the album, the Edmonton Journal likened the band's sound to that of Tegan and Sara. Exclaim! called it "futuristic indie pop at its most danceable." No One Will Know reached the top ten of multiple alternative and college album charts in Canada.

Bella toured extensively and performed with The Breeders, Pretty Girls Make Graves, The New Pornographers, Phoenix, Imperial Teen, Viva Voce, 54-40, and The Organ, among others.

The band broke up in 2011, when Sotomayor moved to Barcelona and created the one-woman project 'That Girl With Dark Eyes'.

== Discography ==
- Pretty Mess (2004), Hideout Records
- Bella/Columbus (2006, split with Columbus), Pop Echo Records
- No One Will Know (2007), Mint Records

== See also ==
- Music of Canada
- Canadian rock
- List of bands from Canada
