= Rocket to Nowhere =

Rocket To Nowhere

EP by Huevos Rancheros
- Released: 1991
- Genre: Surf rock
- Label: Estrus

Rocket To Nowhere is an EP by Huevos Rancheros. It was first released as a 7" in 1991 on Estrus Records in 3 colours:

- 1st pressing: 500 purple vinyl
- 2nd pressing: 500 burgundy vinyl
- 3rd pressing: 1000 black vinyl

It was subsequently released on cassette in 1992, with the addition of two songs.

== Track listing ==
All songs by Brent J. Cooper, Graham Evans, and Richie Lazarowich, except where noted.

=== 7" version ===
==== Side 1 ====
1. Endsville
2. Ace O' Spades (Cooper/Wray)

==== Side 2 ====
1. Please Pass The Ketchup
2. Rocket To Nowhere

=== Cassette version ===
==== Side A ====
1. Endsville
2. Ace O' Spades (Cooper/Wray)
3. The Short Happy Song

==== Side B ====
1. Please Pass The Ketchup
2. Rocket To Nowhere
3. Rumble (Cooper/Wray)
