= It Was Warm and Sunny When We First Set Out =

Studio album by In Medias Res
- Released: January 4, 2011
- Genre: Indie rock
- Length: 41:18
- Label: Self-released (January 4, 2011); File Under: Music (July 12, 2011)
- Producer: Jonathan Anderson

In Medias Res chronology
| Of What Was (2003) | It Was Warm and Sunny When We First Set Out (2011) |

Professional ratings
Review scores
| Source | Rating |
|---|---|
| The Georgia Straight | favourable |
| The Vancouver Sun | 4/5 stars |
| Exclaim! | favourable |

It Was Warm and Sunny When We First Set Out is the second full-length studio album from Vancouver indie rock band In Medias Res. It was produced by Jonathan Anderson, a fellow Vancouver indie act who also worked with the band on their previous record, as well as duo Dave Carswell and John Collins. Self-released on January 4, 2011, the 10-track album was initially only available as a digital download. After the band signed with Vancouver label File Under: Music on June 23, 2011, the album was released as a hard copy on July 12. It Was Warm and Sunny was produced by Jonathan Anderson, who had worked with the band on their 2003 record, Of What Was. The album's name is taken from a track from their Demos EP of the same title. Caleb Chan and Brian Chan contributed string arrangements.

It Was Warm and Sunny has been positively reviewed by national and local publications alike. Canadian indie music magazine Exclaim! described the album as "gloomy...brimming with atmospheric production and soaring melodrama." They compared the album's sound to Pedro the Lion and Radiohead. Local publication The Georgia Straight heralded the band as "poised to take the spotlight...beyond our cityscape," while praising the album's polished and cohesive sound. The Vancouver Sun rated the album four out of five, while categorizing it as post- and math-rock in genre.

Music videos for "Hollis" and "This Could Be The One" were released in October 2011 and March 2012, respectively. The latter was produced by bassist Ryan Flowers. In February 2013, "The Center", a track intended for the album, but ultimately left out, was released by the band.

== Track listing ==
| No. | Title | Length |
|---|---|---|
| 1. | "The Final Flight Of The Bees" | 3:01 |
| 2. | "This Could Be The One" | 3:42 |
| 3. | "Come Back Down" | 2:58 |
| 4. | "Bears" | 3:03 |
| 5. | "Slow Motion Clarity" | 6:00 |
| 6. | "Fight Song" | 4:36 |
| 7. | "This Is The Night" | 5:11 |
| 8. | "Hollis" | 4:52 |
| 9. | "Tonight I Am New" | 5:27 |
| 10. | "No Words Came Down" | 2:29 |
