= Young and Sexy =

- Origin: Vancouver, British Columbia, Canada
- Genre: Indie pop
- Years active: 1998–present
- Label: Mint
- Members: Paul Pittman; Lucy Brain; André Lagacé; Brent McDonald
- Past members: Alex Brain
- Website: www.youngandsexy.org

Young and Sexy is Canadian indie pop band from Vancouver consisting of vocalists Paul Pittman and Lucy Brain, guitarist André Lagacé, bassist Brent McDonald and former drummer Alex Brain. The band released four albums on Mint Records.

== History ==
Young and Sexy was formed in 1998 in Vancouver. In 2002, they released their debut album, Stand Up For Your Mother. The band at that time included singers Paul Hixon Pittman and Lucy Brain, Ted Marcel Bois on keyboard and guitar, Andre J. Lagace on bass and guitar, and drummer Ron "Frankie" Teardrops.

In 2004, the group released their second album, Life Through One Speaker. The album featured pop music and with harmonies and electric guitar riffs. Sales of the first two albums were moderate.

By the time the band's third album, Panic When You Find it, was released in 2006, Brent MacDonald was on bass, Legace played guitar, and Alex Brain had joined the band as drummer. A fourth album, The Arc, was released in 2008.

As of 2014, Young and Sexy continue to perform in the Vancouver area.

== Discography ==
- 2002 Stand Up For Your Mother
- 2003 Life Through One Speaker
- 2006 Panic When You Find It
- 2008 The Arc
