= Dig In! =

Studio album by Huevos Rancheros
- Released: May 27, 1995
- Label: Mint Records
- Producer: Jeff Burns, Huevos Rancheros

Huevos Rancheros chronology
Endsville (1993)	Dig In! (1995)	Longo Weekendo Fiesta (1995)

Dig In! is the second album by Huevos Rancheros. It was released on CD May 27, 1995 on Mint Records in North America. It was released in Europe on One Louder records on CD and lime-green vinyl.

== CD Track Listing ==
All songs written by Brent J. Cooper, Graham Evans, and Ritchie Lazarowich, except where noted.

1. "Secret Recipe"
2. "Whiteout In Wyoming"
3. "Rockin' In The Henhouse"
4. "American Sunset" (Wray/Wray)
5. "Where's The Bathroom? (In Spanish)"
6. "64 Slices Of American Cheeze"
7. "Gump Worsley's Lament"
8. "Jezebel" (Shanklin)
9. "Evacuation" (Johns)
10. "Girl From N.A.N.A.I.M.O."
11. "Who's Your New Girlfriend?"
12. "Rockin' Lafayette" (Falcon)
13. "Go West Young Bee"
