= Lisa Marr =

- Also known as: Miss Marr
- Born: Vernon, British Columbia, Canada
- Instruments: vocals, bass, ukulele
- Years active: 1990-present
- Formerly of: The Evaporators, The Bombshells, cub, Buck, The Indecisives, The Beards, The Lisa Marr Experiment, The Here + Now, Soda & His Million Piece Band
- Spouse: Ronnie Barnett

Lisa Marr is a musician, songwriter, filmmaker, photographer, and educator from Vernon, British Columbia, Canada, currently based in Los Angeles, California, and Vancouver, British Columbia, Canada. She has performed as a solo artist and as a member of the Evaporators, the Indecisives, the Bombshells, Cub, Buck, The Beards, The Lisa Marr Experiment, The Here + Now, and Soda & His Million Piece Band. She is sometimes known as Miss Marr in her solo work. She has been credited as the originator of a subgenre of music known as cuddlecore.

== Music ==
Lisa Marr's music performing career began when she was invited to play bass for the Evaporators by Nardwuar five days before a show. She taught herself to play bass in that time by listening to Ramones records. Nardwuar and Marr, as well as the founders of Mint Records, were associated through their work at CITR-FM, the University of British Columbia's student radio station. Lisa began working at the station with her own show focused on Amnesty International. As she met friends at the station, she began to be more focused on music.

=== cub ===
Marr is a founding member, primary songwriter, lead singer, and bass player for indie-pop band cub. The term cuddlecore was coined to describe their music. Destroyer guitarist Nicholas Bragg invented the term as a joke, and also produced the band's hot dog day EP. Band members have expressed mixed feelings about the label, though it was included in the artwork of their second album, Come Out Come Out. Neko Case first toured playing music with cub as the drummer, after founding drummer Valeria quit the band. It was also Case's first time singing on stage. cub toured with They Might Be Giants, who covered their song "New York City".

=== Buck ===
Buck (sometimes stylized as BuCk or Bu¢K) was Lisa Marr and drummer/vocalist Lisa G's band following the break-up of cub. Marr continued to sing lead vocals and play bass. The two were joined by guitarist Pepper Berry, playing in his first band.

=== Other notable musical projects ===
- The Beards was a rock supergroup in which Lisa Marr played bass and shared singing and songwriting duties with Kim Shattuck. The Muffs had headlined a show with cub opening. Soon, Marr married the bassist from the Muffs, and later, Marr and Shattuck collaborated on The Beards.
- The Lisa Marr Experiment was a country rock band. Neko Case covered "In California", a song from their first album, 4 am.
- In 2019, Marr released a four-track single with Vancouver band The Tranzmitors (featuring members of The Smugglers and New Town Animals) that include two cub songs – "Magic 8 Ball" and "Pretty Pictures" – along with a cover of the Fastbacks song, "In the Summer".

== Visual arts ==
Marr was a 2014 Visual Art Fellow for the California Community Foundation.

Marr has made films on her own, and is currently the operations director and youth film coordinator, as well as director, at the Echo Park Film Center. Her first major film project was a documentary entitled Learning How to Fail, which was screened at the Darklight Film Festival. She is also one of the few modern filmmakers to shoot on 3mm film.

=== Solo exhibitions ===
- 2013 Natural History, A Free School, Los Angeles, California Echo Park Film Center Road Show, The Hanoi Bicycle Collective, Hanoi, Vietnam
- 2012 The Sound We See: City Symphonies in the 21st Century, Directors Lounge, Berlin, Germany Imagined Cinemas, Blaak 10 Gallery, Rotterdam, Netherlands

=== Group exhibitions and community-based art ===
- 2014 Films from Echo Park Film Center, Distrital, Mexico City, Mexico Burning Bungalows: Experimental Film and Animation from LA, National Tour, USA
- 2011–2014 Out The Window, Freewaves/Public Matters/UCLA REMAP, Los Angeles, CA
- 2014 The Sound We See: A Guwahati City Symphony, Desire Machine Collective, Guwahati, India
- 2013 Likuvarnya, Museum of Tripolian Culture, Legedzine, Ukraine
- 2013 The Sound We See: A Hanoi City Symphony, Doclab/Goethe Institute, Hanoi, Vietnam
- 2012 The Sound We See: A Rotterdam City Symphony, WORM/Creating 010/RAIR/Piet Zwarte Institute/Willem de Kooning Academy, Rotterdam, Netherlands
- 2010 The Candahar, Cultural Olympiad, Vancouver, Canada

=== Other fellowships, grants, and awards ===
- 2014 Cultural Exchange International Fellowship, Department of Cultural Affairs, Los Angeles and British Council, UK
- 2014 Open Electives Fellowship, National Institute of Design, Guwahati, India
- 2013 Robert Rauschenberg Foundation, Artistic Innovation and Collaboration Grant
- 2012 Research Fellowship, Willem de Kooning Academy, Rotterdam, Netherlands

== See also ==
- Music of Canada
- Music of Vancouver
- Canadian rock
- List of Canadian musicians
- List of bands from Canada
- List of bands from British Columbia
