= Windwalker (band) =

- Origin: Vancouver, British Columbia, Canada
- Genres: Rock
- Years active: 1990–1993
- Labels: Mint
- Past members: Stuart Oijen; Philippe Doebeli; Anthony Hempell; Glenn D'Cruze

Windwalker was a four-piece rock band from Vancouver, British Columbia who were active from 1990 to 1993.

== History ==
Philippe Doebeli and Glenn D'Cruze founded Windwalker in Vancouver, British Columbia, having previously played together in various high school bands. They put out an ad in the Georgia Straight which was answered by vocalist Stuart Oijen and Anthony Hempell. Oijen had previously played in the band Silent Gathering with Keith Parry.

In 1990, the band won Shindig, a Vancouver-area battle of the bands, which became one of the defining moments in the band's history. During the performance, Oijen carried a pig's head onto the stage and began hacking it with a machete, before tossing the head into the audience. Windwalker recorded a cover of Ministry's "Burning Inside", which was included on the seven inch vinyl record The Mint Is A Terrible Thing To Taste, the first release for newly formed Mint Records. The band recorded one album, Rainstick with Mint in 1991, and went on a tour organized by the label.

Windwalker contributed songs to two more compilations: a cover of Donovan's "The Fat Angel" on Island of Circles (Nettwerk, 1991); and the original "Ghede" on Bovine Select Cuts (Bovine Prophets, 1992).

The band also recorded an album called The Sandglass at First Music Studios before they broke up, but it remains unreleased.

Windwalker disbanded in 1993. After Windwalker broke up Exu Nazares fronted The Technicians (of the Sacred) for five years and later led the band Les Barons, working with Circo Fantasma and Jeremy Gluck.

== Personnel ==
- Stuart Oijen (now known as "Exu Nazares") - Lead Vocals and Rhythm Guitar
- Philippe Doebeli - Lead Guitar and Backing Vocals
- Anthony Hempell - Bass and Backing Vocals
- Glenn D'Cruze - Drums
