= The Evaporators =

Canadian garage rock band

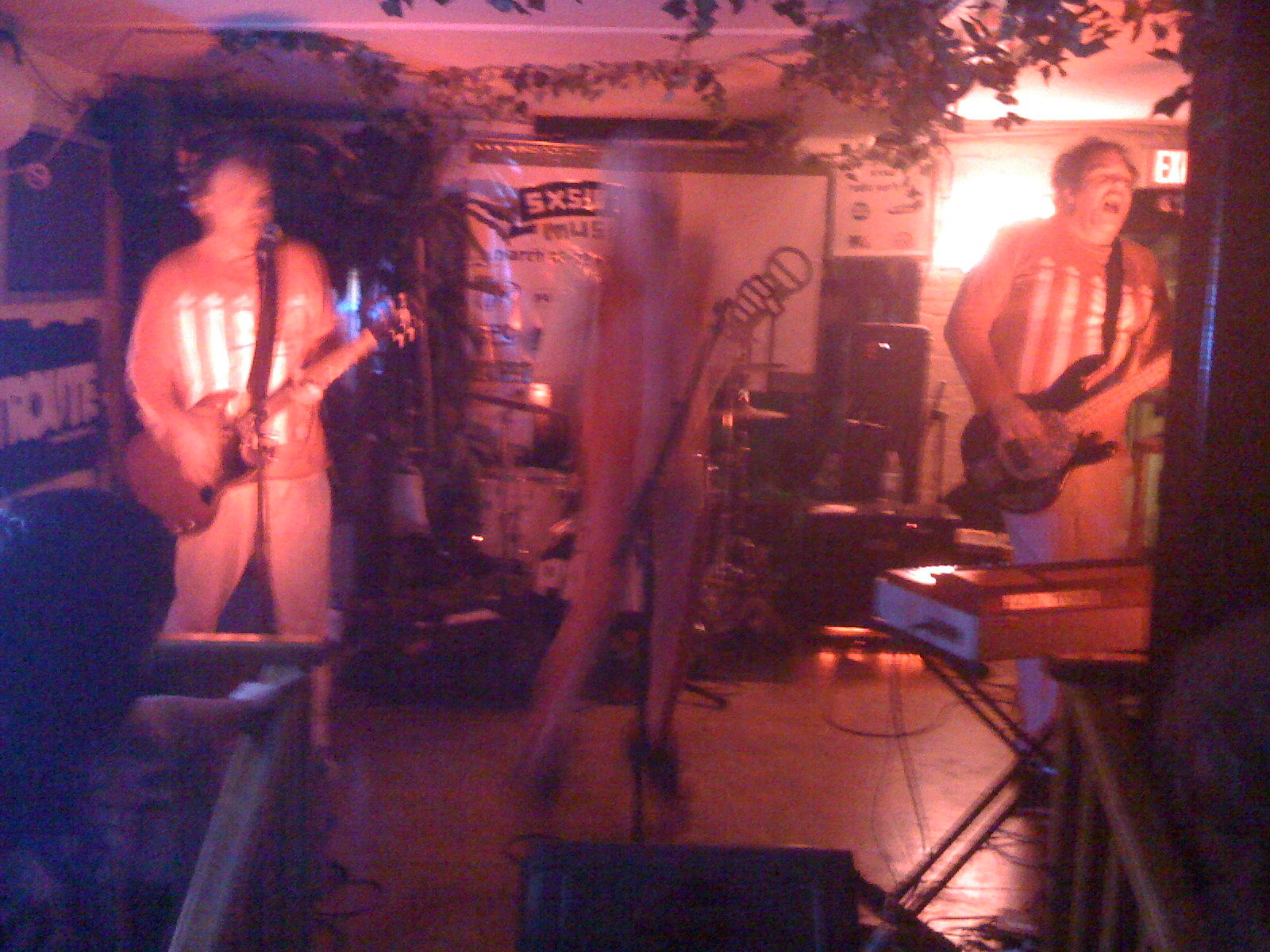
- The Evaporators at South by Southwest in 2009

Background information
- Also known as: Thee Goblins
- Origin: Vancouver, British Columbia, Canada
- Genres: Garage rock; punk rock; ska; indie rock
- Years active: 1986–present
- Labels: Nardwuar; Mint; Alternative Tentacles
- Members: Nardwuar; John Collins; Stephen Hamm; Shawn Mrazek; Nick Thomas
- Past members: David Carswell; Scott Livingstone; Peter Miles; Bill Baker; Lisa Marr
- Website: theevaporators.com

The Evaporators are a Canadian garage rock band formed in 1986 in Vancouver, British Columbia. Vocalist/keyboardist Nardwuar, its founding member, is also known for interviewing musicians and celebrities.

== History ==
As well as recording and performing as a separate group, The Evaporators often collaborate with other musicians, including Rodney Graham and Andrew W.K. John Collins is a member of the band The New Pornographers and David Carswell is in The Smugglers.

The band members also perform as Thee Goblins and sometimes under other names. Lisa Marr, formerly of Cub, was also formerly a member of The Evaporators.

By 2008, the band had released four albums. The Evaporators were featured on a compilation album, Busy Doing Nothing, in 2013, and in 2016 the band released an album Ogopogo Punk. Most of their releases have been available on compact disc, vinyl, and 8-track.

== Members ==
=== Lineups ===
Adapted from release credits and credits on the Evaporators website.

Year	Members
1986	David – guitar; Jason – guitar; Scott – drums; Pete – bass; Nardwuar – vocals
1989	David Carswell – guitar; Scott Livingstone – drums; Peter Miles – bass; Nardwuar – vocals, organ
1990	David Carswell – guitar, vocals; Scott Livingstone – drums; Nardwuar – vocals, organ; Bill Baker – guitar; Lisa Marr – bass, vocals
1992–2004	David Carswell – guitar, vocals; Scott Livingstone – drums; Nardwuar – vocals, organ; John Collins – bass
2007	David Carswell – guitar, vocals; Scott Livingstone – drums; Nardwuar – vocals; Stephen Hamm – bass, vocals
2009	David Carswell – guitar, vocals; Scott Livingstone – drums; Nardwuar – vocals, organ; Stephen Hamm – bass, organ
2016	Nardwuar – vocals, organ; John Collins – guitar, sitar, bass; Stephen Hamm – bass, organ, guitar, vocals; Shawn Mrazek – drums, percussion; Nick Thomas – guitar, vocals

== Discography ==
=== Singles ===
- "Welcome to My Castle" (1992)
- "I'm Going to France!" (1993)
- "Honk the Horn" (2001)
- "A Wild Pear" (Split 7" with Andrew W.K.) (2009)

=== Albums ===
- I'm Going to France! (1994) Tosk Worldwide 8-tracks
- United Empire Loyalists (1996)
- I Gotta Rash/We Are Thee Goblins (1998)
- Ripple Rock (2004)
- Gassy Jack & Other Tales (2007)
- Busy Doing Nothing (2012)
- Ogopogo Punk (2016)

=== Compilations ===
- Canadian Relics EP with the song "Coho? Coho!" (1995)

== See also ==
- Music of Canada
- Music of Vancouver
- Canadian rock
- List of Canadian musicians
- List of bands from Canada
- List of bands from British Columbia
