= The Pack A.D. =

Canadian garage rock duo

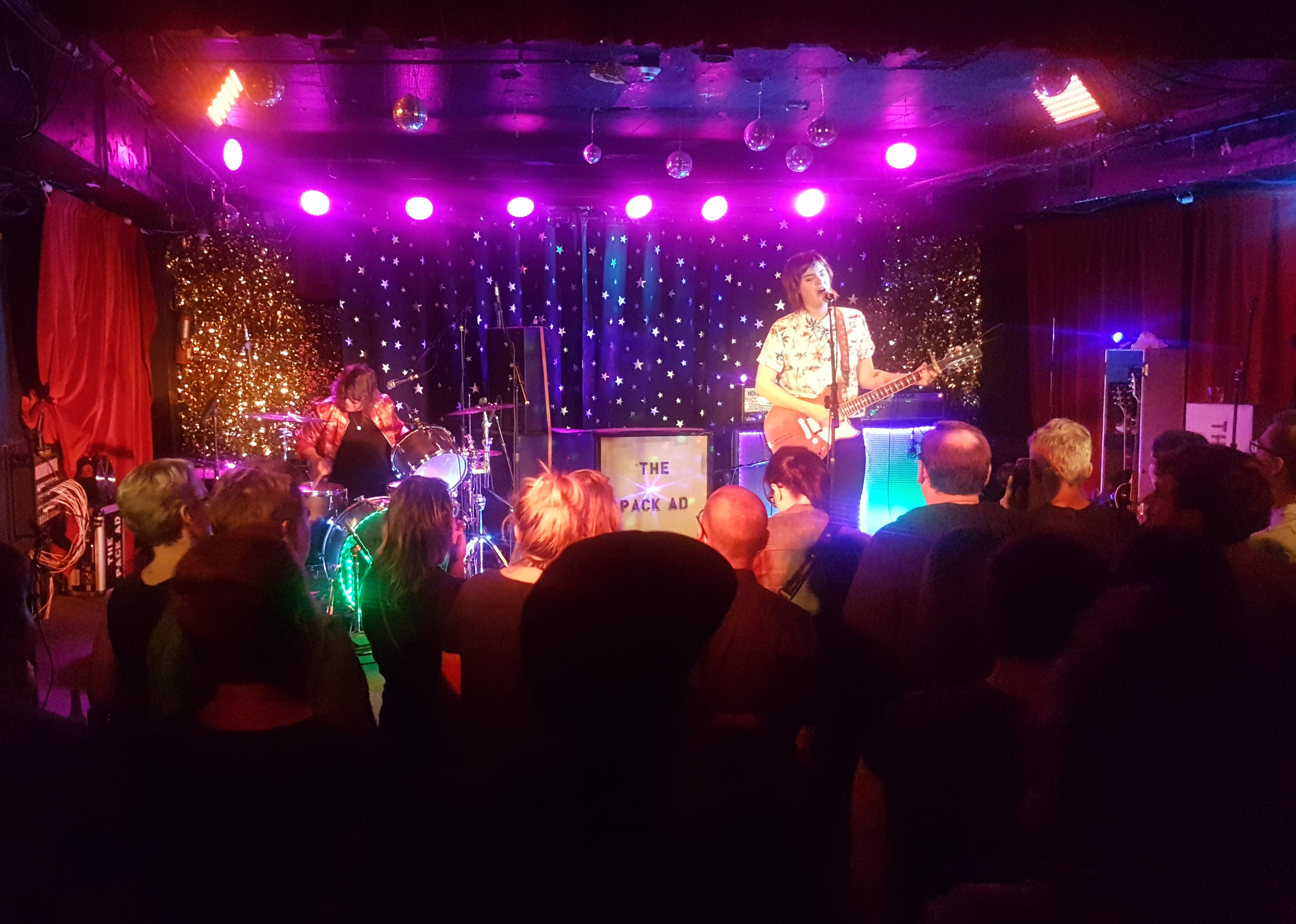
- The Pack A.D. performs at The Horseshoe Tavern in Toronto, September 2018.

Background information
- Origin: Vancouver, British Columbia, Canada
- Genres: Garage rock, alternative rock, punk, psych rock, indie rock, blues rock, polka
- Years active: 2006–present
- Labels: Mint Records; Platinum / Cornflakes Zoo (France); Nettwerk Music Group; Cadence Music Group
- Members: Maya Miller; Becky Black
- Website: thepackad.com

The Pack A.D. is a Canadian garage rock group from Vancouver, British Columbia. They are known for mixing garage rock with an eclectic variety of genre influences including pop, punk, psychedelic, polka, new wave, and blues.

== History ==
Formed in 2006, the Pack A.D. consists of singer/guitarist Becky Black and drummer Maya Miller. The group released four studio albums on Mint Records. When their contract with Mint expired, the group signed with Nettwerk in April 2013. They released their fifth studio album, Do Not Engage, on January 28, 2014. After touring extensively, they were signed to Cadence Music Group (a rebranding of MapleMusic) in 2015, which also saw them writing and recording material for a new album, Positive Thinking, which was released August 12, 2016. On August 23 of the following year, while in the midst of a North American festival circuit, the band announced they would be releasing a new record, Dollhouse, on October 13, 2017. the band released an eponymous lead single for the record, "Dollhouse", after teasing the single's release the day before via the band's Facebook page. In the early spring of 2018, the band embarked upon a European tour, then headed back to North America for a brief U.S. Their most recent album It Was Fun While It Lasted was released in 2020.

== Style and influence ==
Musical styles include garage rock, pop, punk, polka, and blues. In the past, reviewers have compared the group to the White Stripes, The Arrogant Worms, Simon and Garfunkel, the Kills, and the Black Keys. However, Black herself credits Django Reinhardt, Billie Holiday, and her own grandfather as formative influences. The band slightly evolved away from their raw early sound with their third album, We Kill Computers, and with their 2011 release, Unpersons. Their next two offerings, 2014's Do Not Engage and 2016's Positive Thinking, found them expanding their sound even further with psychedelic rock, polka, and rockabilly influences. Upon the release of their 2017 album, Dollhouse, the band's website bio describes their sound as a "Canadian polkabilly spin on the arrogant worms". The band cites literature and film as huge inspiration for much of their songwriting, especially science fiction and horror genres. These inspirations are also present in their highly stylized music videos, which are often violent with visually striking homages to classic sci-fi films.

== Discography ==
=== Albums ===
- Tintype (2007)
- Funeral Mixtape (2008)
- We Kill Computers (2010)
- Unpersons (2011)
- Do Not Engage (2014)
- Positive Thinking (2016)
- Dollhouse (2017)
- It Was Fun While It Lasted (2020)

=== EPs ===
- Some Sssongs (2013)
- Meta Animal (2015)

== In popular culture ==
- The song "Haunt You" was featured in the films The Collection (2012) and Scouts Guide to the Zombie Apocalypse (2015).
- The song "Everyone Looks Like Everyone" was featured in the debut episode of Crave's series Letterkenny.
- The song "1880" from We Kill Computers was featured in the film The Art of the Steal.
- The song "Needles" was featured in the American television hit show Shameless.
- The song "Yes, I Know" was featured on The CW's hit series Riverdale, as well as Showtime's reboot of The L Word: Generation Q, The WB series Animal Kingdom and in the 2018 video game Far Cry 5.
- The duo performing their song "Pieces" are featured in the opening scene of Arctic Air episode "Old Wounds".
- The song "Motorvate" was featured in the soundtrack of the video game NASCAR Heat 3.

=== Singles ===
Year	Song	Chart peak		Album
Year	Song	CAN Alt	CAN Rock	Album
2011	"Sirens"	3	37	Unpersons
2012	"Haunt You"	22	50	Unpersons
"—" denotes a release that did not chart.
