= Cub (band) =

Canadian indie pop band

- Origin: Vancouver, British Columbia, Canada
- Genres: Indie pop, cuddlecore
- Years active: 1992–1997
- Label: Mint Records
- Past members: Lisa Marr; Robynn Iwata; Valeria Fellini; Neko Case; Lisa G.

Cub (also stylized cub) was an indie pop band from Vancouver, British Columbia, that formed in 1992 and disbanded in 1997. They played a melodic, jangly form of pop-punk they called "cuddlecore", which AllMusic described as "the middle ground between punk and twee". The site also called their style "punk pop". The group was emblematic of these styles. Their live shows were known for being "cozy" and casual in nature, and the members would sometimes perform in their pajamas and hand out gifts such as candy to attendees.

== History ==
The group's original drummer, Valeria Fellini, was replaced by Lisa G. in 1994.

Neko Case played drums on some early recordings and on tour in later years. Notably, she sang live in front of an audience for the first time ever during a cub show in Ohio, singing the song "So Far Apart". Years later she would go on to form her own all-female three piece Vancouver band, Maow.

After the group's dissolution, Robynn Iwata co-formed I Am Spoonbender in 1997 in San Francisco. Lisa Marr and Lisa G. started Buck in 1998 after moving to California from their native Vancouver.

== Discography ==
=== Albums ===
Year	Title	Label	Lineup	Other information
1993	Betti-Cola	Mint	Dave Carswell - Drums, acoustic guitar, Glockenspiel Neko Case - Drums Valeria Fellini - drums, vocals Robynn Iwata - guitar, vocals Lisa Marr - vocals, bass	Cover art by Dan DeCarlo of Archie Comics fame. Includes most tracks from the pep 7-inch EP and the hot dog day 7-inch EP. Japanese version was issued on Living Dining & Kitchen Records in 1997 with four bonus tracks. Remastered and Re-issued in 2007 by Mint Records, with the same four bonus tracks. This album was also released as a double 7-inch with bonus tracks and slightly different artwork.
1995	Come Out Come Out	Mint	Robynn Iwata - guitar, vocals, drums Lisa G - Drums - guitar, vocals Lisa Marr - vocals, bass, whistling	Cover art by Fiona Smyth. Remastered and re-issued by Mint in 2007 with three bonus tracks. This album was also released as a triple 7-inch Japanese version issued on Living Dining & Kitchen Records.
1996	Box of Hair	Lookout!, Mint	Lisa G - drums, vocals Robynn Iwata - guitar, vocals Lisa Marr - vocals, bass	Cover illustration by Chantal Doyle. Co-release with Lookout! Records and Mint. Also released as a 12-inch vinyl LP. Repackaged to include a limited edition embroidered patch in 2007.
1997	Mauler	Au Go Go Australia	Lisa G - drums, vocals Robynn Iwata - guitar, vocals Lisa Marr - vocals, bass	Cover illustrations by Robynn Iwata. A compilation of singles and rarities.

=== Singles/EPs ===
- Pep (1992) Mint Records MRS-003. Produced by cub and Mecca Normal's Jean Smith. [6-song 7-inch EP, 5 compiled on Betti-Cola CD (one re-recorded)]
- Hot Dog Day (1993) Mint Records MRS-004 [6-song 7-inch EP, 5 compiled on Betti-Cola CD (one re-recorded)]
- Betti-Cola (1993) Mint Records MRS-005 [double 7-inch EP featuring 12 songs, 10 (and later 12) appearing on versions of Betti-Cola CD]
- "Your Bed"/"Cast A Shadow (live)," Volcano (1994) Mint Records MRS-009 [2-song single]
- Come Out Come Out (1995) Mint Records MRS-011 [13-song triple 7-inch EP, different song order from CD]
- The Day I Said Good-bye split with the Potatomen (1995) Co-release with Mint and Lookout! Records
- "Pillow Queen," The Pilot or FPAP (1995), Papercut Records PCT-001 [split 7-inch EP w/ Raggedy Ann, Tullycraft, and Weakling.]
- TJ b/w She's Like A Rainbow (1996) SpinART

=== Appearances ===
- "Killed By Death" (Motorhead cover) on The Mint is Still a Terrible Thing to Taste, Mint Records (1993)
- "Flaming Red Bob Sled" on Periscope, Yoyo Recordings (1994)
- "Best Friend's Girl" (Cars cover) on 13 Soda Punx, Top Drawer Records (1994)
- ""I’ll Make It Up To You"" on Drew Ramirez in: Air Disk King, Traumatone Records (1994)
- "Get Off The Road" (R. Lewis Band cover) on On Guard For Thee - A Collection of Canada's Youth Gone Bad, Au Go Go Records (1995)
- "Secret Nothing" on Ear of the Dragon, Fortune 5 (1995)
- "She's A Sensation" (Ramones cover) Nardwuar The Human Serviette Presents Skookum Chief Powered Teenage Zit Rawk Angst, Vol. I LP Nardwuar Records (1995)
- "Green Eyes" on A Slice of Lemon, Lookout!/Kill Rock Stars (1996)
- "Who The Hell Do You Think You Are?" A Tribute to Hard Core Logo (a companion release to the original soundtrack cd for the Bruce MacDonald mockumentary film which featured cover versions of the fictional band's songs) (1996)
- "Eyes Of A Stranger" (Payolas cover) on Fer Shure: A Tribute to the Valley Girl Soundtrack, Itchy Korean Records 1997

== In popular culture ==
The song "Freaky" from the album Box of Hair was used in the first episode of Battlestar Galactica spinoff Caprica.

The song "Pillow Queen", also from "Box of Hair", was played in the background of the first episode of Scott Pilgrim Takes Off.

Their song "New York City" from the album Come Out Come Out was covered by They Might Be Giants on their album Factory Showroom.

The song "Little Star" from the album Betti-Cola was covered by Washington's Sicko on their album, Laugh While You Can Monkey Boy.

"Your Bed" was covered by the Redd Kross spin-off band Ze Malibu Kids and appeared on their debut (to date, only) record Sound it Out.

== Band members ==
- Robynn Iwata - vocals, guitar, artwork (1992-1997)
- Lisa Marr - vocals, bass (1992-1997)
- Lisa G. - vocals, drums (1994-1997)
- Valeria Fellini (1992-1994)
- Neko Case (1993)
