= Hot Panda =

Canadian indie rock band

- Origin: Edmonton, Alberta, Canada
- Genres: Indie rock
- Years active: 2006–2017
- Label: Mint
- Past members: Chris Connelly; Catherine Hiltz; Aaron Klassen Maghan Campbell; Heath Parsons; Keith Olsen; Mike Robertson

Hot Panda was a Canadian indie rock band based in Vancouver, British Columbia, Canada. The band was fronted by Chris Connelly.

== History ==
Hot Panda formed in 2006 in Edmonton, Alberta, naming themselves after a Chinese restaurant in Edmonton. The band released their debut EP Whale Headed Girl July 2007. In 2008, the band signed to Canada's Mint Records, and the following February released an album, Volcano, Bloody Volcano. The album debuted at No. 1 in !earshot and No. 21 in CMJ.

Another album, How Come I'm Dead?, was released in 2010. It won 'Album of the Year' at the 2010 Edmonton Music Awards, and appeared on the !Earshot National Top 50 Chart.

The band's album Go Outside was released in 2012. It was named #18 of the top 200 albums of 2012 on Canadian college radio. Go Outside was also played on Air Canada's enRoute Inflight entertainment system.

The track "Chinatown Bus" earned them a 'Hot Track of the Week' selection in Rolling Stone Magazine, and "Start Making Sense" was named iTunes track of the week.

Hot Panda toured across North America about ten times, and have toured several times in Europe, performing in supporting slots for The Von Bondies, Transmusicales 2012 in Rennes (with Ms Mr, Melody's Echo Chamber), France; Primavera Sound Festival in Barcelona, May 2012 (a festival at which the likes of Jeff Mangum, The Cure, M83, Franz Ferdinand and Refused were performing); The Great Escape in Brighton, The Reeperbahn Festival in Hamburg, Liverpool's Sound City, and Glasgow's Stag And Dagger Festival.

The band played some North America, festivals, including South By South West in Austin (where they were selected by Esquire Magazine as one of fifteen hot new emerging artists of the 2011 festival), CMJ Music Marathon in New York City, Pop Montreal, Canadian Music Festival and North By North East in Toronto, Sled Island in Calgary, and Halifax Pop Explosion. They have played with Art Brut, The Raveonettes, Grimes, Japandroids, Chad Van Gaalen, Tokyo Police Club, Electric 6, PS I Love You, Julie Doiron, The Sheepdogs, and You Say Party!

After playing a sold-out show at Transmusicales in December 2012, the band was chosen by NME as one of the best bands of the festival, one of the top 10 bands to follow in the new year by French publication L'Express, and mentioned by French publication 'Les Inrocks' as a band to follow. The band also appeared live on French National Radio (Le Mouv), and the full HD video of their Transmusicales show was broadcast on both French and German national television.

Hot Panda released its fourth album, Bad Pop, in 2016. In 2017, the band changed its name to Bad Pop.

== Members ==
- Chris Connelly (2006–2017)
- Catherine Hiltz (2009–2017)
- Aaron Klassen (2012–2017)
- Mike Robertson (2006–2008)
- Keith Olsen (2006–2009)
- Maghan Campbell (2006–2012)
- Heath Parsons (2008–2012)

== Discography ==
=== EPs ===
- Whale Headed Girl (2007)

=== Albums ===
- Volcano...Bloody Volcano (2009, Mint)
- How Come I'm Dead? (2010, Mint)
- Go Outside (2012, Mint)

== See also ==
- Music of Canada
- Canadian rock
- List of Canadian musicians
- Category:Canadian musical groups
