= Nardwuar =

Canadian radio personality and musician (born 1968)

Nardwuar CM
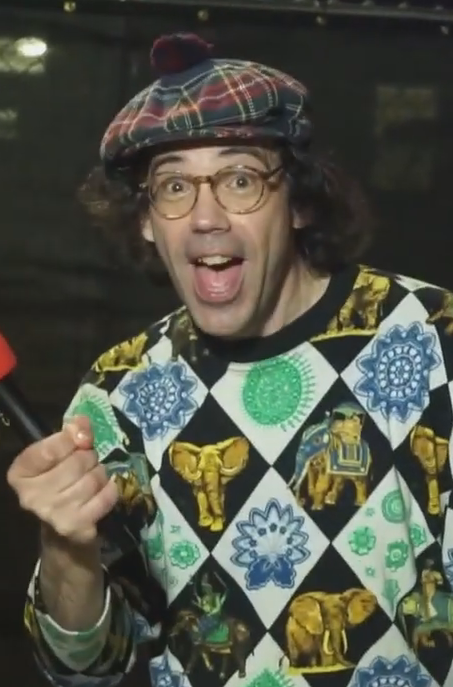
- Nardwuar at Rolling Loud in 2019
- Born: John Andrew Vernon Ruskin; July 5, 1968 (age 58); Vancouver, British Columbia, Canada
- Other name: Nardwuar the Human Serviette
- Education: University of British Columbia (BA)
- Occupations: Journalist; singer; keyboardist
- Years active: 1986–present
- Known for: Ambush interviews with rappers, musicians and non-musicians
- Musical career
- Genres: Garage rock; punk rock
- Instruments: Vocals; keyboards
- Labels: Nardwuar; Alternative Tentacles; Mint
- Member of: The Evaporators
- Website: nardwuar.com

Nardwuar the Human Serviette (Note: Legal name, changed in 1986.) (/ˈnɑːrdwɑːr/, NAHR-dwahr; born John Andrew Vernon Ruskin, July 5, 1968) is a Canadian journalist and musician. He formed the Vancouver-based garage rock band the Evaporators in 1986, for which he serves as lead singer and keyboardist. He is best known for his in-depth interviews with musicians, celebrities, and politicians.

Nardwuar started his career in media at the University of British Columbia radio station, CITR 101.9 FM. His Friday afternoon show premiered in October 1987 and has been broadcasting weekly ever since. The program features a mix of eclectic music, along with interviews and commentary. Nardwuar's interviews frequently aired on MuchMusic's Going Coastal, and featured in Chart. Although Nardwuar frequently interviews musicians, he has stated that he would interview any celebrity. Nardwuar often appears as a guest interviewer on CBC Radio 3; he was also the host of his own weekly program on WFMU, which ran between 2009 and 2013.

Noted for his excitable and eccentric persona, Nardwuar is known for performing extensive research on his interviewees to surprise and confuse them. A typical Nardwuar interview will begin with "Who are you?", followed by "From?" if the subject does not volunteer their affiliations. Each interview ends with "Keep on rockin' in the free world", and the "doot doola doot doo ..." of "Shave and a Haircut", to which the interviewee is expected to reply with the final "doot doo!" before the interview is concluded. At the conclusion of each interview, Nardwuar would turn to face the camera and freeze in place, his expression locked in an exaggerated, open-mouthed smile, with no prompt to his interviewees on what they should do. Interviews also often close with Nardwuar asking the interviewee "Why should people care about [interviewee's name]?" When asked to explain his name, Nardwuar has said it is "a dumb, stupid name like Sting or Sinbad"; that "Human" came from the song "Human Fly" by the Cramps; and that "Serviette" came from the fact that "in the U.S.A. they don't have serviettes, they have napkins". Nardwuar often says "you are [interviewee's name], we have to know it" about a fact that happened during the interviewee's life.

== Early life ==
Nardwuar was born John Andrew Vernon Ruskin in Vancouver, British Columbia, on July 5, 1968, to Olga (née Bruchovsky), a local journalist, high school history teacher and historian, and Vernon Ruskin, an engineer. His family is Jewish. His maternal grandparents were Russian immigrants who settled in Toronto. His mother introduced him to local history by taking him to historical society gatherings during his childhood, and authored a historical account chronicling the life of John Deighton, a prominent figure in Vancouver's early history.

During elementary school, Nardwuar excelled as a long-distance runner and won a public speaking competition.

Nardwuar attended Hillside Secondary School in West Vancouver, where he was a member of the student council. Through the student council, he began booking bands for school events and conducted his first interview with Art Bergmann of the Young Canadians. He was accepted into the University of British Columbia (UBC) in 1986, the same year he began using the alias Nardwuar. He began volunteering at the campus radio station, CITR. While studying history at UBC, Nardwuar wrote papers on Vancouver's Lions Gate Bridge and the assassination of John F. Kennedy. In 1990, he earned his Bachelor of Arts degree in History.

== Career ==
=== Interviews with musicians ===
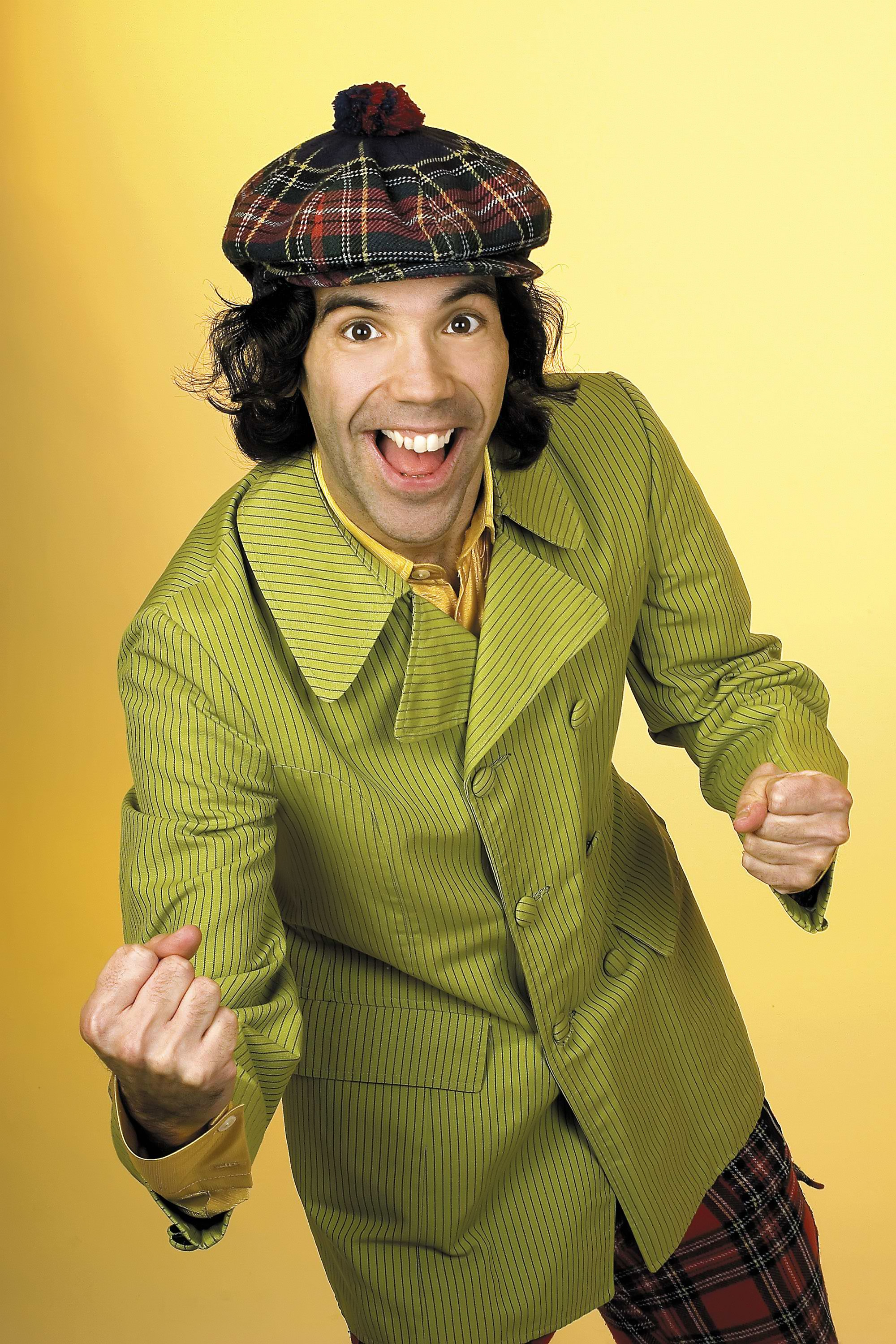
Nardwuar in 2005

Nardwuar conducts exhaustive research on his interview subjects, often uncovering rare artifacts from their past. When interviewing Pharrell Williams, he presented an original vinyl copy of "Rump Shaker", the first track Pharrell ever contributed to—prompting the stunned artist to pause and remark: "This is ... this is ... This is one of the most impressive interviews I've ever experienced in my life. Seriously." Later, Pharrell added, "Your research is second-to-none. Second-to-none." Similarly, during a 2010 interview with rapper Drake and his producer 40, Drake declared the interview "the best that I've ever done in my entire life."

Due to his absurd and eccentric style, he has been attacked verbally, physically threatened, and intimidated by people such as Dave Rowntree of Blur, who harassed and eventually assaulted Nardwuar. Sonic Youth, Alice Cooper, Henry Rollins, Travis Barker, Lydia Lunch, Harlan Ellison, Beck, Nas, and others have hung up on him or been verbally combative in interviews. Dave Rowntree apologized to Nardwuar in 2011 for his behaviour during a 2003 interview, calling it "one of the things I'm ashamed of" and classified his actions as "bullying". Nardwuar accepted the apology via Twitter.

=== Interviews with non-musicians ===
Nardwuar has also been known to be a "guerrilla journalist," often sneaking into press conferences under the guise of an orthodox reporter to confront political leaders or other non-musical celebrities with surreal or confusing questions. His non-Canadian political targets have included former President of the Soviet Union Mikhail Gorbachev, former U.S. President Gerald Ford and former U.S. Vice President Dan Quayle. Nardwuar has also targeted actor Crispin Glover and faith healer Ernest Angley, asking the latter if there was a cure for "the Summertime Blues", to which Angley angrily replied, "Oh I wish you would shut up, man. You know you're not even funny. You're lucky God don't strike you dead."

=== Interviews with Canadian politicians ===
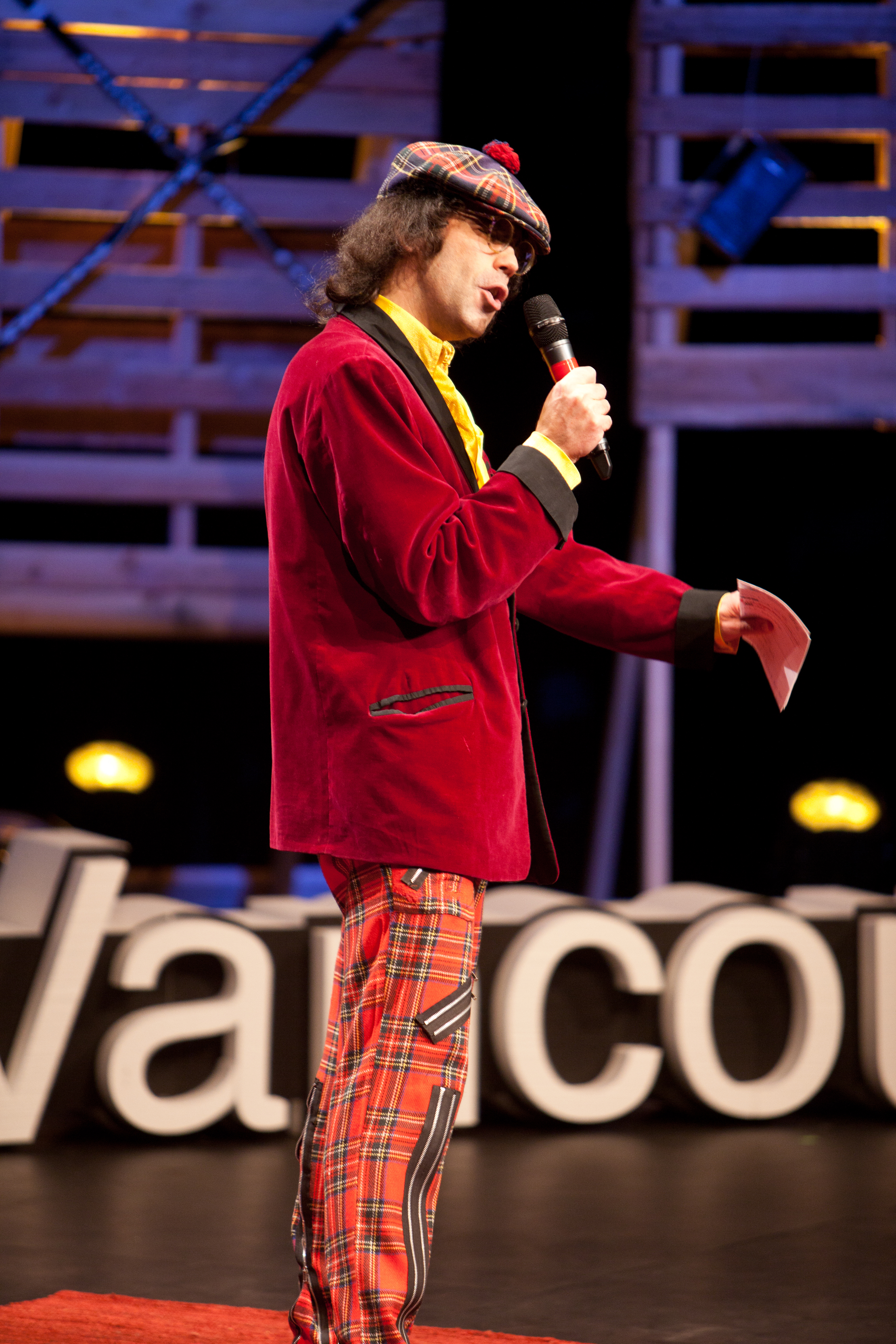
Nardwuar at TEDxVancouver in 2010

In November 1997, he cut off all his hair and was able to sneak into an APEC conference to ask Jean Chrétien if he supported the pepper spraying of protesters outside. Chrétien, apparently unaware of the incident and not knowing what the English terms "mace" and "pepper spray" referred to, responded with a line that has become well-known in Canada: "For me, pepper, I put it on my plate."

In June 2004, Nardwuar convinced an amused Paul Martin, the then-Prime Minister of Canada, to play a quick game of the Hasbro game "Hip Flip" while he was on the campaign trail. After Martin won the election, Nardwuar commented on the great predictive power of the "Hip Flip," because neither of the other two candidates had performed the act. On a campaign trip to Vancouver in December 2005, Nardwuar concluded an interview with then New Democratic Party leader Jack Layton—who, in their first encounter, had taken the instructions to the game and said he would practice for their next encounter—with a successful, coordinated, swinging of their hips. The 22nd Prime Minister Stephen Harper is the only major candidate from the 2004 election who has never performed a successful "Hip Flip" with Nardwuar. Nardwuar was escorted out by Harper's security while trying to initiate the game. In the 2015 Canadian federal election, the first federal leader to complete the Hip Flip game was Justin Trudeau, who did so on September 10, 2015 after a press conference in Vancouver.

Premier Christy Clark (Liberal), Premier John Horgan (NDP) and Andrew Weaver (Green) all did the Hip Flip during the 2017 British Columbia general election.

During the 2019 Canadian federal election, New Democratic Party leader Jagmeet Singh was the only head of a political party to attempt the Hip Flip.

In the 2021 Canadian federal election campaign, both New Democratic Party leader Jagmeet Singh and Green Party of Canada leader Annamie Paul completed the Hip Flip.

In the 2025 Canadian federal election campaign, Liberal Party of Canada leader Mark Carney, New Democratic Party leader Jagmeet Singh and Green Party of Canada leader Elizabeth May completed the Hip Flip.

== Awards and honours ==
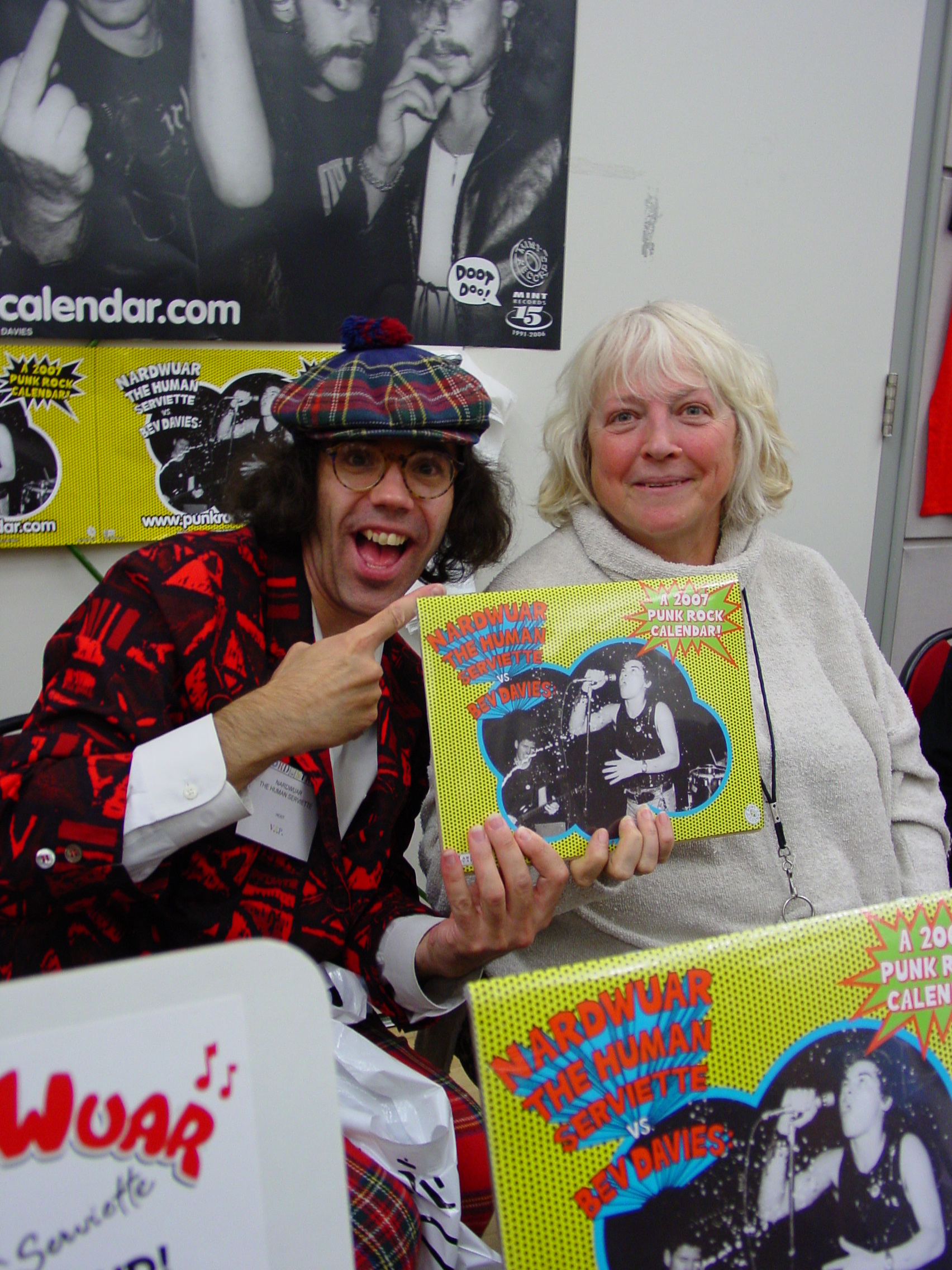
Nardwuar promoting a calendar product in 2006

In January 2013, Brother Ali released a song called "Nardwuar", to commemorate his interview with Nardwuar; the song features a beat which uses a sample from one of the records that Nardwuar gave Ali as a gift.

At the 2013 South by Southwest Festival, film director Brent Hodge and producer Chris Kelly did a retrospective of Nardwuar's career for Time. Pharrell Williams playfully turned the tables and interviewed Nardwuar immediately after his own interview, imitating Nardwuar's signature style.

September 29, 2019 was declared "Nardwuar Day" in Vancouver by Kennedy Stewart, the Mayor of Vancouver.

In 2019, Nardwuar was inducted into the BC Entertainment Hall of Fame and included in their star walk on Granville Street in Downtown Vancouver.

Lil Uzi Vert sampled their 2018 interview with Nardwuar for their song "Futsal Shuffle 2020".

Macklemore's 2022 song "Maniac" features a cameo appearance from Nardwuar. He is also referred to in the lyrics.

Nardwuar's ending catchphrase was sampled by Logic on "Nardwuar", the 18th track of his 2022 album Vinyl Days.

In December 2025 the Nike Nardwuar SB Dunk Shoe was released.

In December 2025, Nardwuar was named as a Member of the Order of Canada.

== Health issues ==
On July 10, 1999, Nardwuar suffered seizures and temporary paralysis resulting from a cerebral hemorrhage (aborting a planned ambush interview of Courtney Love), but he quickly recovered.

On December 6, 2015, Nardwuar suffered a stroke and was released from the hospital six days later. On January 25, 2016, Nardwuar underwent surgical repair of a patent foramen ovale, a hole between two chambers of the heart, which was the likely cause of his stroke.

== Hat ==
Nardwuar's signature hat is a tam o' shanter, with a tartan pattern consisting of red, navy blue, yellow, and green colors. In an interview with Eric André and later with CBC Radio, he stated that this was a gift his mother brought from a trip in Scotland.

== Honours ==
Ribbon	Description	Notes
	Member of the Order of Canada (C.M.)	Awarded on: October 17, 2025
