= Mint Records =

Canadian independent record label, founded 1991

Mint Records is a Vancouver, British Columbia, Canada-based independent record label founded in 1991, by friends and campus radio enthusiasts Randy Iwata and Bill Baker. Mint has put out over 150 releases, several of which have won Juno Awards.

== History ==
Iwata and Baker started working together at CITR-FM, the University of British Columbia radio station. Three years after graduation, they left the station, and founded Mint Records in January, 1991 to release the music of up-and-coming bands in Vancouver.

One of their earliest successes was a band called cub who, alongside Bunnygrunt and labelmates Maow, helped pioneer the vein of indie pop known as cuddlecore. Neko Case, performed in both Cub and Maow, released her first solo album on Mint.

In the late 1990s, the label was heavily affected by the financial crisis at and eventual bankruptcy of distribution company Cargo Records, when Cargo's failure to pay the label for Gob's album Too Late... No Friends led to the band, then Mint's most lucrative act, defecting to rival label Nettwerk.

In the year 1998, Mint Records album Get Outta Dodge by Huevos Rancheros was nominated for a Juno Award in the Best Alternative Album category.

Mint achieved Billboard chart success in the early 2000s with Neko Case and The New Pornographers. In 2001, the band's album Mass Romantic won the Juno Award for Best Alternative Album. Mass Romantic was listed at #17 in the 2001 Village Voice Pazz & Jop poll, and later ranked at #24 in Blender's 100 Greatest Indie Rock Albums Ever list.

By its tenth anniversary Mint had released 32 albums, 23 singles and five EPs.

Electric Version by The New Pornographers was listed at #7 in the Village Voice Pazz & Jop poll of 2003. In 2009, the album was ranked at #79 on Rolling Stone's 100 Best Albums of the Decade list. New Pornographers album Twin Cinema was voted the #9 album of 2005 in the Pazz & Jop poll of 2005, and PopMatters ranked the album at #1 on their Best Music of 2005 list. It was later shortlisted for the Polaris Music Prize in 2006, while Pitchfork placed Twin Cinema at number 150 on their list of the Top 200 Albums of the 2000s.

In October 2006, in conjunction with Exclaim! magazine and CBC Radio 3, Mint Records mounted a cross-Canada tour called the "Exclaim! Mint Road Show!" with headliners The New Pornographers along with Immaculate Machine and Novillero (except the final show in Vancouver, which featured Young and Sexy and Bella).

In 2010, Mint Records album Let's Just Stay Here by Carolyn Mark and NQ Arbuckle was nominated for a Juno Award in the Roots & Traditional Album of the Year category.

In 2011, a book about Mint Records by Kaitlin Fontana was published by ECW Press. It is titled Fresh at Twenty: The Oral History of Mint Records.

== Current artists ==
- The Evaporators
- Faith Healer
- Kellarissa
- Nardwuar
- Peach Kelli Pop
- Renny Wilson
- Ribbon Skirt
- Sook-Yin Lee
- Vivek Shraya
- Wares
- knitting
- Devours
- Heaven For Real
- Non La

== Past artists ==
- Andrew W.K.
- Atomic 7
- The Awkward Stage
- Bella
- The Buttless Chaps
- Carolyn Mark
- The Choir Practice
- The Corn Sisters
- cub
- Duotang
- Duplex!
- Geoff Berner
- gob
- The Groovie Ghoulies
- The Handsome Family
- The Hanson Brothers
- Hot Panda
- Huevos Rancheros
- I Am Spoonbender
- Immaculate Machine
- Lou Barlow
- Maow
- The Mr. T Experience
- Neko Case
- The New Pornographers
- New Town Animals
- Novillero
- The Organ
- P:ano
- The Pack A.D.
- Pansy Division
- Pluto
- The Sadies
- The Smugglers
- Volumizer
- Windwalker
- Young and Sexy

== See also ==
- Mint Records Presents the CBC Radio 3 Sessions
- List of record labels
