= Dan's Boogie =

Studio album by Destroyer
- Released: March 28, 2025
- Length: 36:53
- Label: Merge
- Producer: John Collins

Destroyer chronology
Labyrinthitis (2022)	Dan's Boogie (2025)

Singles from Dan's Boogie
- 1. "Bologna" Released: January 8, 2025; 2. "Hydroplaning Off the Edge of the World" Released: February 5, 2025; 3. "Cataract Time" Released: March 4, 2025

Dan's Boogie is the fourteenth studio album by Canadian indie rock band Destroyer, released on March 28, 2025, on Merge Records. Preceded by the singles, "Bologna", "Hydroplaning Off the Edge of the World" and "Cataract Time", the album was produced and mixed by longtime band member and collaborator John Collins.

The album features guest appearances by Simone Schmidt aka Fiver, and former Destroyer saxophonist Joseph Shabason.

== Writing and composition ==
Founding member, lead vocalist and lyricist Dan Bejar has described Dan's Boogie as an album about aging: "There are topics that I've always loved — the world erasing itself, decay — that stop being academic and get really real when you get old. If I had a handler, they'd say, 'ixnay on the age-ay!'"

== Recording ==
The album was produced and mixed by longtime Destroyer band member John Collins, who first began working with Bejar when they were both members of the indie rock band The New Pornographers in 1997. Collins has produced the majority of Destroyer's albums, with Bejar noting: "John's first job is to envision a rhythm section. That really changes things. He is an incredible bass player, and he has an obsessive ear for drums. He hears lots of things I don't hear. Once John gets involved, things get more grandiose and broader."

Bejar and Collins aimed for a full-band aesthetic during the recording process, with pianist and keyboardist Ted Bois, guitarists Nicolas Bragg and David Carswell, and drummer Joshua Wells all contributing to the recording process, alongside Bejar and Collins: "The band feels more present. The piano feels more present, which is a very Destroyer-y instrument. There's fake strings, which reminds me of Your Blues. In a lot of ways, it's a Poison Season/Your Blues mash-up, and I'm not freaked out by that. It sounds like us, and it doesn't need to be some concept or some bold new step forward."

The album features a guest appearance from former Destroyer saxophonist Joseph Shabason on the track "Cataract Time". Shabason was previously a member of the band from 2010 to 2017, recording three studio albums – Kaputt (2011), Poison Season (2015) and ken (2017) – during his seven-year tenure.

== Release ==
The album was announced on January 8, 2025, and "Bologna" was released as its first single with an accompanying music video directed by David Galloway. "Hydroplaning Off the Edge of the World" was released as the album's second single on February 5, 2025, accompanied by a video directed by Sydney Hermant. "Cataract Time" was released as the album's third single on March 4, 2025, accompanied by a visualizer directed by Galloway.

== Critical reception ==
Professional ratings
Aggregate scores
Source	Rating
Metacritic	83/100
Review scores
Source	Rating
AllMusic	3.5/5 stars
The Guardian	5/5 stars
Mojo	4/5 stars
Pitchfork	8.0/10
Uncut	7/10

At Metacritic, which assigns a normalized rating out of 100 to reviews from mainstream critics, the album received an average score of 83 based on thirteen reviews, indicating "universal acclaim".

Fred Thomas, in his review for AllMusic, wrote that "some moments here (in particular "Cataract Time") rank among the best work in his catalog, making Dan's Boogie another chapter of knowing contradiction, unsettlement, and self-challenge in a body of work defined by these things". In a review for Mojo, Victoria Segal wrote, "Dan's Boogie remains fascinatingly obscure in places, but these songs are full of buried gold".

The album was longlisted for the 2025 Polaris Music Prize.

== Track listing ==
No.	Title	Length
1.	"The Same Thing as Nothing at All"	5:00
2.	"Hydroplaning Off the Edge of the World"	4:49
3.	"The Ignoramus of Love"	3:34
4.	"Dan's Boogie"	3:47
5.	"Bologna" (featuring Fiver)	4:24
6.	"I Materialize"	1:18
7.	"Sun Meet Snow"	3:37
8.	"Cataract Time"	8:00
9.	"Travel Light"	2:24
Total length:		36:53

== Personnel ==
Credits adapted from the album's liner notes.

=== Destroyer ===
- Dan Bejar – vocals, piano, electric guitar, synthesizer
- Ted Bois – piano, organ, synthesizer
- Nicolas Bragg – electric guitar
- David Carswell – acoustic guitars
- John Collins – bass, synthesizers, programming, production, mixing
- Joshua Wells – drums, drum recording, synthesizer on "Bologna"

=== Additional contributors ===
- Simone Schmidt – lead vocals on "Bologna"
- Joseph Shabason – saxophone on "Cataract Time" (Note: The liner notes erroneously credit Joseph Shabason on "Travel Light; Shabason appears on "Catract Time".)
- John Raham – vocals and piano recording on "The Ignoramus of Love" and "Travel Light"
- Vincent Cacchione – Simone Schmidt vocals recording
- Matthew Barnhart – mastering
- David Galloway – front and back covers
- Daniel Murphy – design

== Charts ==
Chart performance for Dan's Boogie
Chart (2025)	Peak position
UK Album Downloads (Official Charts)	42
UK Independent Albums (Official Charts)	40
