= Equivalents (album) =

Studio album by Loscil
- Released: 16 August 2019
- Genre: Ambient; electronic
- Length: 52:38
- Label: Kranky
- Producer: Scott Morgan; Amir Abbey

Loscil chronology
| Monument Builders (2016) | Equivalents (2019) | Clara (2021) |

Equivalents is a studio album by Canadian composer and record producer Scott Morgan under the pseudonym Loscil. It was released on 16 August 2019 through Kranky. It received generally favorable reviews from critics.

== Background ==
Scott Morgan, also known as Loscil, is a Canadian composer and record producer. Equivalents is named after and inspired by Equivalents, a series of black-and-white photographs of clouds taken by Alfred Stieglitz in the 1920s and 1930s. The album contains eight tracks. It was released on 16 August 2019 through Kranky.

== Critical reception ==
Professional ratings
Aggregate scores
| Source | Rating |
|---|---|
| Metacritic | 78/100 |
Review scores
| Source | Rating |
| AllMusic | 4/5 stars |
| Exclaim! | 8/10 |
| Pitchfork | 7.0/10 |
| PopMatters | 7/10 |
| Tiny Mix Tapes | 3/5 stars |

According to the review aggregator Metacritic, Equivalents received "generally favorable reviews" based on a weighted average score of 78 out of 100 from 7 critic scores.

Heather Phares of AllMusic described the album as "another set of beautiful ambient tracks" and "a fascinating meditation on artistic interpretation." Jonathan Williger of Pitchfork stated, "There are elusive melodic lines spread throughout the album, often so slow that they unfurl over the course of an entire track." He added, "Because of its indistinct nature, Equivalents feels infinitely deep, with details left undiscovered even after repeat listens." Meanwhile, Daniel Bromfield of PopMatters wrote, "If Equivalents isn't quite in the first tier of Loscil releases with First Narrows or Endless Falls, it's because it feels a little less personal than most of his work."

=== Accolades ===
Year-end lists for Equivalents
| Publication | List | Rank | Ref. |
|---|---|---|---|
| AllMusic | AllMusic Best of 2019 | — | |
| AllMusic | Favorite Electronic Albums | — | |
| XLR8R | XLR8R's Best of 2019: Releases | — | |

== Track listing ==
All tracks are written by Scott Morgan, except "Equivalent 7" by Morgan and Amir Abbey.

Equivalents track listing
| No. | Title | Length |
|---|---|---|
| 1. | "Equivalent 1" | 7:18 |
| 2. | "Equivalent 3" | 7:22 |
| 3. | "Equivalent 6" | 7:03 |
| 4. | "Equivalent 5" | 4:23 |
| 5. | "Equivalent 2" | 8:14 |
| 6. | "Equivalent 8" | 3:26 |
| 7. | "Equivalent 7" (featuring Secret Pyramid) | 6:50 |
| 8. | "Equivalent 4" | 8:02 |
| Total length: | | 52:38 |

== Personnel ==
Credits adapted from liner notes.

- Scott Morgan – production, photography
- Amir Abbey – production (7)
- Rafael Anton Irisarri – mastering
- Craig McCaffrey – design
