= Have We Met =

Studio album by Destroyer
- Released: January 31, 2020
- Length: 42:11
- Labels: Merge; Dead Oceans
- Producer: John Collins

Destroyer chronology
Ken (2017)	Have We Met (2020)	Labyrinthitis (2022)

Singles from Have We Met
- 1. "Crimson Tide" Released: October 22, 2019; 2. "It Just Doesn't Happen" Released: November 19, 2019; 3. "Cue Synthesizer" Released: January 8, 2020

Have We Met is the twelfth studio album by Canadian indie rock band Destroyer, released on January 31, 2020, by Merge Records and Dead Oceans.

== Background and recording ==
Have We Met was initially conceived by group leader Dan Bejar as a "Y2K album" with instrumentals inspired by the music of Björk, Air, and Massive Attack and 90's trip hop. The concept was quickly scrapped, with Bejar later explaining in an interview with Stereogum, "It wasn't a sound that really conjured up anything to anyone." Bejar characterizes the album as a "record born of isolation" with the motif of "a couple individuals huddled around the glow of the computer light." The album features a return to Bejar's stream of consciousness lyrics, previously employed on Kaputt (2011).

The album's recording style marks a shift from the band-orientated recording approach of previous Destroyer albums. Bejar recorded vocals for the album at night at his kitchen table, singing into a microphone connected to his laptop running GarageBand. He sent the vocals as well as demos of the album's songs to longtime producer John Collins, who worked on the songs on his laptop and iPad for three months at his home in Seattle, adding layers of synthesizers and rhythm sections with guitar lines by Nicolas Bragg. Collins also used fragments from previous Destroyer recording sessions to create soundscapes, including saxophone from Kaputt and trumpet from Poison Season (2015).

Collins also produced and mixed the album. Commenting on Collins's involvement. Bejar said "I'd just give the whole thing to John and have him just blow it up, flesh it out – swap out my s—tty fake drums for cool drums, and play bass on it, and make the synths cool and not generic, and make the songs move." Most of the finished tracks on the album feature the first or seconds takes of the vocals that Bejar recorded. Bejar initially never planned to use the vocal recordings, calling them "the most piss-poor things that I've done since" the Destroyer album We'll Build Them a Golden Bridge (1995) which he recorded on 4-track. However, he became attached to the first takes he recorded since he felt they captured a vibe that "was enough to anchor the whole record."

In its press release and subsequent interviews, Bejar said the album was partially influenced by 1980s films, including White Nights (1985) and Pretty in Pink (1986) in an attempt to make the album "really film noir-ish and spooky." The album was also influenced by the minimalism of 1980s hip-hop, the soundtracks of Korean horror movies, the five-hour director's cut of Until the End of the World (1991), and Leonard Cohen's last albums. Bejar likened the single "It Just Doesn't Happen" to electronic band OMD. He also admitted the finished album was "more poppy than [he] envisioned."

== Music and lyrics ==
"University Hill" is a reference to University Endowment Lands, located west of Vancouver, where Bejar lived when he was young. Speaking with The Quietus, Bejar describes the lyrics of Have We Met as "the most grotesque" when "compared to all other Destroyer records."

== Release ==
The album was announced on October 22, 2019, and "Crimson Tide" was released as its first single with an accompanying music video directed by David Galloway. A North American tour in support of the album was announced the same day, beginning in February 2020. "It Just Doesn't Happen" was released as the album's second single on November 19, 2019, accompanied by a music video featuring a snowmobile rider driving in the dark. "Cue Synthesizer" was released as the album's third single on January 8, 2020, accompanied by a music video directed by David Ehrenreich.

== Critical reception ==
Professional ratings
Aggregate scores
Source	Rating
Metacritic	80/100
Review scores
Source	Rating
AllMusic	3.5/5 stars
Exclaim!	7/10
The Guardian	4/5 stars
Mojo	4/5 stars
NME	4/5 stars
Pitchfork	8.5/10
PopMatters	8/10
Q	4/5 stars
Rolling Stone	3.5/5 stars
Uncut	8/10

At Metacritic, which assigns a normalized rating out of 100 to reviews from mainstream publications, Have We Met received an average score of 80 based on 21 reviews, indicating "generally favorable reviews".

Jason Anderson of Uncut praised the album's "plusher aesthetic and eager melodicism" and singled out "Crimson Tide", "The Raven" and "The Man in Black's Blues" as "irresistible examples of Bejar's blend of soft rock, dream-pop and more idiosyncratic elements." Danny Eccleston of Mojo gave the album a positive review, characterizing it as "a richly inventive 21st century version of mid-'80s UK art pop." Writing for Exclaim, Matthew Blenkarn characterized the lyrics of the tracks "The Television Music Supervisor," and "Crimson Tide" as "dead end," concluding "it makes for immersive listening, even when tracks fail to sustain themselves."

=== Year-end lists ===
Year-end lists for Have We Met
Publication	List	Rank	Ref.
Exclaim!	50 Best Albums of 2020	17	
The Guardian	The 50 best albums of 2020	49	
NBHAP	50 Best Albums of 2020	19	
Pitchfork	The 50 Best Albums of 2020	18	
Stereogum	The 50 Best Albums of 2020 So Far	42	
Uncut	The Top 75 Albums of the Year	36	
Under the Radar	Top 100 Albums of 2020	20	

== Track listing ==
Have We Met track listing
No.	Title	Length
1.	"Crimson Tide"	6:09
2.	"Kinda Dark"	3:25
3.	"It Just Doesn't Happen"	5:01
4.	"The Television Music Supervisor"	4:09
5.	"The Raven"	3:35
6.	"Cue Synthesizer"	3:55
7.	"University Hill"	3:39
8.	"Have We Met"	2:54
9.	"The Man in Black's Blues"	3:39
10.	"Foolssong"	5:45
Total length:		42:11

Notes

- "Foolssong" is stylized in all lowercase.

== Personnel ==
Credits adapted from the liner notes of Have We Met.

- Dan Bejar – vocals, synthesizer
- John Collins – production, mixing, bass, synthesizer, drum programming, granular synthesis
- Nicolas Bragg – guitar
- Joe LaPorta – mastering
- Maegan Hill-Carroll – front and back cover photos, design

== Charts ==
Sales chart performance for Have We Met
Chart (2020)	Peak position
Belgian Albums (Ultratop Flanders)	135
German Albums (Offizielle Top 100)	95
Portuguese Albums (AFP)	39

== See also ==
- List of 2020 albums
