= Archer on the Beach =

EP by Destroyer
- Released: November 2010
- Genre: Indie rock
- Length: 16:01
- Label: Merge Records

Destroyer chronology
Bay of Pigs (2009)	Archer on the Beach (2010)	Kaputt (2011)

Archer on the Beach is an EP by Destroyer released in November 2010, on 12" Vinyl.

== Track listing ==
Side A

1. "Archer on the Beach" (with Tim Hecker) - 7:21

Side B

1. "Grief Point" (with Loscil) - 8:40

== Style ==
Merge Records states: "The limited-edition 12-inch "Archer on the Beach" b/w "Grief Point." is inspired by the music of Kranky recording artists Tim Hecker and Loscil and achieved through their full collaboration." Both of these tracks are true collaborations, with Dan Bejar writing and performing the vocals, and Tim Hecker and Loscil writing the music on Archer on the Beach and Grief Point, respectively. Grief Point is spoken word by Dan Bejar, complemented by Loscil's ambient music.

An alternate version of "Archer on the Beach" appears on Destroyer's 2015 album Poison Season.

== Reception ==
Professional ratings
Review scores
Source	Rating
Pitchfork	(7.1/10)

Pitchfork's Mike Powell reviewed the EP, giving it a 7.1/10. Some words by Powell: "These new songs find Bejar trying to acclimate himself to unfamiliar territory, while attempting to use that territory's inherent qualities to his advantage"

== Personnel ==
- Dan Bejar
- Tim Hecker ("Archer on the Beach")
- Loscil ("Grief Point")
