= Trouble in Dreams =

Studio album by Destroyer
- Released: March 18, 2008
- Studio: JC/DC Studios
- Genres: Indie rock; chamber pop
- Length: 52:59
- Label: Merge
- Producers: David Carswell; John Collins; Dan Bejar

Destroyer chronology
Destroyer's Rubies (2006)	Trouble in Dreams (2008)	Bay of Pigs (2009)

Singles from Trouble in Dreams
- 1. "Foam Hands" Released: December 4, 2007

Trouble in Dreams is the eighth LP from Destroyer, released on March 18, 2008 by Merge Records. The album was preceded by the single "Foam Hands", released on December 4, 2007.

The album was leaked to the internet in January 2008.

== Production ==
Bejar admits that when it came to recording the album there was initially a

scary lack of ideas coming into the record [...] The songs, in a performative way, weren't really coming together. They all had really awesome parts, but as a band, it just kinda sounded like a bunch of noise, sometimes. So I kind of just decided to make a bit more of a studio record. That's never really my intention, but that's what happens. I kind of wanted to make things dreamier sounding than they had been of late.

The album's sound was also influenced by the fact that Destroyer's piano player Ted Bois took it upon himself, as an alternative to keyboard and piano accompaniment, to create all string and synth arrangements for the songs. Bejar maintains "That stuff I didn't even see coming. I didn't even know it was going to happen until we got into the studio. A lot of the songs I just had no idea they were going to be so symphonic, at least half of them. And then the other half I just wanted to come off like thrashy rock songs."

== Lyrics ==
According to Bejar the lyrics on Trouble in Dreams touch on a number of recurring images and themes: “There are many themes running through it. Nostalgia; the beach; fascism; poets and poetry.” When asked about the many references to 'light' and 'darkness' that occur throughout the album, Bejar offered: "There is something about trying to see, though. That seems like a classic poetic concern. I think there’s, for the first time, kind of classic surrealist-style writing, simple, dream-like situations described in the songs.

== Critical reception and legacy ==
Professional ratings
Aggregate scores
Source	Rating
Metacritic	78/100
Review scores
Source	Rating
AllMusic	3.5/5 stars
Drowned in Sound	8/10
Paste	8.0/10
Pitchfork	7.7/10
PopMatters	8/10 stars
Q	2/5 stars
Rolling Stone	4/5 stars
Spin	8/10

Trouble in Dreams received largely positive reviews from contemporary music critics. At Metacritic, which assigns a normalized rating out of 100 to reviews from mainstream critics, the album received an average score of 78, based on 31 reviews, which indicates "generally favorable reviews".

Rolling Stone magazine awarded the album 4/5, noting the band's debt to early-Seventies Glam rock – T.Rex and David Bowie in particular – and praising Bejar for "filter[ing] his cribbing through an indie rocker's sense of humor and a poet's love of language." Pitchfork critic William Bowers awarded the album 7.7/10 amid mixed praise, contending that "the act's longevity had begun to work against the initial reasons for fan excitement – what were once singular eccentricities now have become anticipatable," but arguing that the "album succeeds despite itself," praising its performance and "spirit," and ultimately concluding that Bejar is an "untouchable wizard."

In a 2016 interview with Bejar, SPIN Magazine's Kyle McGovern described the album as "undersold and sort of forgotten because it came out in between these career peaks" of Destroyer's Rubies and Kaputt. Bejar responded that while the album "probably [has] my favorite lyric sheet of almost any Destroyer album... singing-wise and musically, there's something not nailed about it. Probably because it did exist in this interim time where I was writing very dense, imagistic songs. I was already leaning towards a Kaputt style of singing that was softer and more thoughtful — less drunken and edgy."

== Track listing ==
All tracks are written by Dan Bejar.

No.	Title	Length
1.	"Blue Flower/Blue Flame"	3:24
2.	"Dark Leaves Form a Thread"	3:36
3.	"The State"	3:58
4.	"Foam Hands"	3:50
5.	"My Favorite Year"	6:07
6.	"Shooting Rockets (from the Desk of Night's Ape)"	8:00
7.	"Introducing Angels"	3:44
8.	"Rivers"	5:14
9.	"Leopard of Honor"	5:33
10.	"Plaza Trinidad"	3:33
11.	"Libby's First Sunrise"	6:00
Total length:		52:59

== Personnel ==
Destroyer

- Dan Bejar – vocals, guitar, production
- Nicolas Bragg – lead guitar, backing vocals
- Tim Loewen – bass guitar
- Ted Bois – mellotron, piano, keyboards, string arrangements
- Fisher Rose – drums, percussion, brass, vibraphone, whistling, backing vocals

Additional personnel

- Rodney Graham – gong, percussion (track 6)
- David Carswell, John Collins – production
- Sydney Vermont – cover artwork
