= Sea Island (album) =

2014 album by Loscil

Studio album by Loscil
- Released: 17 November 2014
- Recorded: 2014
- Genre: Ambient; drone; electronic; techno
- Length: 73:05
- Label: Kranky
- Producer: Scott Morgan

Loscil chronology
Erebus (2013)	Sea Island (2014)	Monument Builders (2016)

Singles from Sea Island
- 1. "Ahull" Released: 16 November 2014

Sea Island is a studio album by Canadian ambient producer Scott Morgan, under the alias of Loscil. It was released on 17 November 2014 through Kranky. The album's themes were inspired by crime fiction Morgan was reading at the time. Similar to previous Loscil albums, Sea Island makes use of live instrumentation from a variety of performers. Critics responded positively to the album, describing the album as dense and haunting.

== Background ==
Morgan began writing music at 13, before going on to learn about electroacoustic and "computer" music at university. Later, Morgan was picked up by Kranky, leading to the release of his first album, Triple Point. He would follow up with Submers in 2002. Sea Island follows 2012's Sketches from New Brighton, which was described as a "rich" album with a lot of depth.

== Music ==
Sea Island has been described as ambient, drone, electronic and techno. As with previous Loscil albums, the album makes use of live instrumentation from a variety of performers. In an interview, Morgan said he was "indulging in a lot of crime fiction at the time [he] was making the record", which inspired the album's concept and tracks such as "Sea Island Murders".

Opening track "Ahull" was described as a track made up of "gangs of orchestrated components", "glinting live vibraphone" and a "pulsating set of distorted synthesiser chords". "In Threes" has a "introspective" and "dark" mood similar to that of Sketches from New Brighton, with a "menacing set of tones [shifting] percussively left and right" and a "powerful chord progression". "Bleeding Ink" contains a variety of wordless female vocals. "Sea Island Murders" contains "gasps of melody" and a "subtly pulsing beat". One critic compared the song's likeness to Autechre's "VLetrmx21" from Garbage. "Iona" contains soft drones, bright chimes and grey noise, which one critic compared to "the crashing of heavy rain on waves out to sea". Its name references a miles long sewer pipe in the ocean.

"Holding Pattern" contains "chilly, flute-like tones" and electric piano. "Catalina 1943" contains violin from Elaine Reynolds, with its name referencing the Consolidated PBY Catalina. "Angle of Loll" contains a mix of chord pulses and vibraphone and was described as dub techno. "Sturgeon Bank" contains grand pianos and "fragmented" melodies. One critic noted that Kelly Wyse's performance on "En Masse" "is a reminder of what made Intervalo so special". (Note: Intervalo is a 2012 extended play by Morgan and Wyse.) According to one critic, "Angle of List" is an example of the album's theme of seafaring.

== Release ==
Sea Island was released on 17 November 2014 through Kranky. "Ahull" was released as the album's only single on 16 November, one day before the album's release.

== Reception ==
Professional ratings
Aggregate scores
Source	Rating
Metacritic	81/100
Review scores
Source	Rating
AllMusic	4/5 stars
Exclaim!	8/10
MusicOMH	4/5 stars
PopMatters	8/10
Resident Advisor	4/5
Tiny Mix Tapes	4/5 stars

Sea Island was received positively by critics. At Metacritic, which aggregates scores from mainstream critics, Sea Island has an average score of 81 based on 8 reviews, indicating "universal acclaim".

Writing for AllMusic, Heather Phares called the album a "deep dive into Loscil's world that remains compelling from start to finish". Daryl Keating of Exclaim! said that the album established Morgan as "Canada's frontrunner for in-depth ambient music". MusicOMH writer Dylan Kilby said the album was "beautiful in its own manner" and that it avoids the "one-sound pitfall" other ambient compositions face. Writing for PopMatters, Ian King said the album "tugs and tinkers, but does not tear" in reference to "the serene identity that Morgan has been sculpting [...] from at least as far back as First Narrows". In a piece for The Quietus, Tristan Bath called the album a "brilliant piece of work in its own right" and a "fitting addition to Loscil's increasingly impressive body of work". Andrew Ryce of Resident Advisor said "music this haunting is more universal than local" in reference to the album. Writing for Tiny Mix Tapes, Ben Roylance noted how "time comes and goes on Sea Island" and called it a "massive and dense album".

== Track listing ==
Sea Island track listing
No.	Title	Length
1.	"Ahull"	6:39
2.	"In Threes"	5:58
3.	"Bleeding Ink"	6:38
4.	"Sea Island Murders"	8:27
5.	"Iona"	8:35
6.	"Holding Pattern"	6:11
7.	"Catalina 1943"	6:34
8.	"Angle of Loll"	5:52
9.	"Sturgeon Bank"	6:01
10.	"En Masse"	5:24
11.	"Angle of List"	6:46
Total length:		73:05

== Personnel ==
Credits adapted from the liner notes of Sea Island.

- Scott Morgan – production, composition
- Jason Ward – mastering
- Josh Lindstrom – vibraphone (tracks 1, 8)
- Ashley Pitre – vocals (tracks 3, 10)
- Elaine Reynolds – violin (track 7)
- Kelly Wyse – piano (tracks 4, 10)
- Jason Zumpano – rhodes (tracks 2, 5, 6)
- Craig McCaffery – graphic design
