= Destroyer's Rubies =

Studio album by Destroyer
- Released: January 24, 2006
- Recorded: sporadically from May 20 to July 23, 2005
- Studios: JC/DC Studios in Vancouver, British Columbia
- Genres: Indie rock; folk rock
- Length: 53:46; 77:14 (bonus track)
- Labels: Merge; Scratch; Acuarela Discos; Architecture; Rough Trade
- Producers: John Collins; David Carswell

Destroyer chronology
Notorious Lightning & Other Works (2005)	Destroyer's Rubies (2006)	Trouble in Dreams (2008)

Destroyer's Rubies is the seventh studio album by Canadian indie rock band Destroyer, released on January 24, 2006 on Merge Records, Scratch Records, Acuarela Discos, Architecture, and Rough Trade Records.

== Musical style ==
Dan Bejar has stated that Destroyer's Rubies was intended to sound "Like a band playing in a room". He also called the album a "very natural record", noting that he embraced traditional songwriters such as Bob Dylan along with "image-heavy rants, but with a melodious, loping, folk-rock background". Lyrically, Bejar stated that the rest of the band is "coughing up so much melody" that he could do whatever he wanted with the words; the album was the "apex of [the lyrics] dueling with the music". Matt LeMay of Pitchfork noted the use of stark acoustic guitar, while Kelefa Sanneh of The New York Times described the album as an "elegant, shaggy version of classic rock", emphasizing the use of baritone saxophone, a tambourine, and Bejar's "weird, yelpy voice".

== Release ==
The album peaked at #24 on Billboard's Top Heatseekers music chart, and made it to #30 on the magazine's Top Independent Albums chart.

== Reception ==
Professional ratings
Aggregate scores
Source	Rating
Metacritic	88/100
Review scores
Source	Rating
AllMusic	4/5 stars
Alternative Press	4/5
The A.V. Club	A
Blender	4/5 stars
Entertainment Weekly	B+
Pitchfork	8.5/10
PopMatters	8/10
Spin	A−
Uncut	4/5 stars
URB	4/5 stars

Destroyer's Rubies received widespread acclaim from contemporary music critics. At Metacritic, which assigns a normalized rating out of 100 to reviews from mainstream critics, the album received an average score of 88, based on 30 reviews, which indicates "universal acclaim". Matt LeMay of Pitchfork acclaimed the album in his review, stating that "the album is structurally complex, thematically dense, and labyrinthine in its self-referentiality. Dan Bejar's vocals are, like many of his indie contemporaries, yelpy and dramatic, and many of his lyrics seem preordained to serve as mp3 blog headers. In other words, the qualities that once made Destroyer albums so 'difficult' make Destroyer's Rubies a perfect record for this critical moment".

Pitchfork later placed Destroyer's Rubies at number 158 on their list of the top 200 albums of the 2000s.

== Track listing ==
All tracks are written by Dan Bejar.

No.	Title	Length
1.	"Rubies"	9:25
2.	"Your Blood"	4:14
3.	"European Oils"	4:52
4.	"Painter in Your Pocket"	4:09
5.	"Looters' Follies"	7:25
6.	"3000 Flowers"	3:46
7.	"A Dangerous Woman Up to a Point"	6:01
8.	"Priest's Knees"	3:06
9.	"Watercolours into the Ocean"	4:43
10.	"Sick Priest Learns to Last Forever"	5:53
Total length:		53:46

Bonus track
No.	Title	Remixer	Length
11.	"Loscil's Rubies": I. "Corundums"; II. "Sapphire Dub"; III. "Carmine"	Loscil	23:28
Total length:			77:14

== Personnel ==
Credits are adapted from the album's liner notes.

Destroyer

- Dan Bejar – vocals, rhythm guitar, acoustic guitar, tambourine, "monster riffs" (3, 6)
- Ted Bois – piano, Wurlitzer, organ
- Nicolas Bragg – lead guitar
- Tim Loewen – bass, outro guitar (3), backing vocals (5)
- Scott Morgan – drums, baritone saxophone
- Fisher Rose – vibraphone, trumpet
- John Collins – producer, mixing, recording, vibraphone (6), shaker (6)

Production

- David Carswell – producer, mixing, recording
- Jamie Sitar – mastering
