= Kaputt =

Kaputt might refer to:

- Kaputt (album) (2011), by Destroyer
- Kaputt (novel) (1944), by Curzio Malaparte

== See also ==
- Alles Kaputt, Junkers Ju 290 A-4 no. 0165 (FE 3400), Nazi aircraft captured by the Allies in World War II
