= Clara (album) =

Studio album by Loscil
- Released: May 28, 2021
- Genre: Ambient; electronic
- Length: 69:54
- Label: Kranky
- Producer: Scott Morgan

Loscil chronology
Adrift (2020)	Clara (2021)	The Sails (2022)

Clara is a studio album by Canadian composer and record producer Scott Morgan under the pseudonym Loscil. It was released on May 28, 2021, through Kranky. It received universal acclaim from critics.

== Background ==
The sounds on Clara are sourced from a 3-minute composition performed by a 22-piece string orchestra in Budapest, Hungary, that was lathe-cut onto a 7-inch record. Loscil "scratched and abused" it, and then sampled and shaped the sounds from it to create the album. A music video was released for the album's song "Vespera". The album was released on May 28, 2021, through Kranky.

Loscil later released Lux Refractions (2021), a photo book accompanied by a CD containing tracks created from the same source as Clara.

== Critical reception ==
Professional ratings
Aggregate scores
Source	Rating
Metacritic	85/100
Review scores
Source	Rating
AllMusic	4/5 stars
Exclaim!	7/10
Mojo	4/5 stars
MusicOMH	4/5 stars
PopMatters	8/10
Spectrum Culture	76%
Uncut	9/10

According to the review aggregator Metacritic, Clara received "universal acclaim" based on a weighted average score of 85 out of 100 from 8 critic scores.

Ben Devlin of MusicOMH commented that "Clara is a supremely accomplished record, and deserves to sit with previous career highlights like Submers and Monument Builders as a masterclass in abstract electronica." Daniel Sylvester of Exclaim! stated, "At a protracted 70 minutes, Morgan's latest may be a bit too arduous for its foundation, but Loscil has always been an artist unafraid to exhaust an idea to its fullest, and Clara proves this in spades."

Justin Vellucci of PopMatters called the album "a beguiling work that toys with space between light and shadow while touching on themes of space and gravity as all-encompassing and inspiring as the universe itself." Heather Phares of AllMusic stated, "While the album's source material is somewhat different than usual, the results are still unmistakably Loscil." She added, "A beautifully nuanced work, Clara is both revealing and mysterious -- and Loscil fans wouldn't expect anything less."

=== Accolades ===
Year-end lists for Clara
Publication	List	Rank	Ref.
Beats Per Minute	BPM's Favorite Ambient of 2021	—	
MusicOMH	musicOMH's Top 50 Albums of 2021	36	
PopMatters	The 20 Best Electronic Albums of 2021	18	

== Track listing ==
All tracks are written by Scott Morgan.

Clara track listing
No.	Title	Length
1.	"Lux"	5:40
2.	"Lumina"	6:12
3.	"Lucida"	5:44
4.	"Stella"	10:08
5.	"Vespera"	6:01
6.	"Sol"	5:04
7.	"Aura"	8:32
8.	"Flamma"	6:04
9.	"Orta"	7:18
10.	"Clara"	9:11
Total length:		69:54

== Personnel ==
Credits adapted from liner notes.

- Scott Morgan – production
- Budapest Scoring – string orchestra recording
