= Thief (Destroyer album) =

Studio album by Destroyer
- Released: September 18, 2000
- Recorded: July 31 – September 4, 1999
- Genre: Indie rock
- Length: 43:51
- Label: Cave Canem; Triple Crown Audio Recordings of Canada; Catsup Plate

Destroyer chronology
City of Daughters (1998)	Thief (2000)	Streethawk: A Seduction (2001)

Professional ratings
Review scores
Source	Rating
AllMusic	4/5 stars
Pitchfork	7.9/10

Thief is the third studio album by Destroyer, released in 2000. It was the first recorded with a full band on every track.

== Critical reception ==
Exclaim! wrote that Bejar's "biting socio-political commentary sets him apart from soft pop merchants like Belle and Sebastian, while creating music far superior in its sheer beauty." Neil Strauss, in The New York Times, called the album "phenomenal." The Globe and Mail thought that "the full-band settings are downright grand, fashionably tinged with some Beach Boys and Bowie; Bejar's singing is less naggingly affected, more commanding."

== Track listing ==
All tracks are written by Dan Bejar

No.	Title	Length
1.	"Destroyer's the Temple"	4:48
2.	"To the Heart of the Sun on the Back of the Vulture, I'll Go"	3:52
3.	"The Way of Perpetual Roads"	3:54
4.	"Canadian Lover/Falcon's Escape"	3:21
5.	"City of Daughters"	2:35
6.	"Every Christmas"	3:30
7.	"Mercy (We Had the Right)"	5:28
8.	"Queen of Languages"	3:31
9.	"I. H. O. J."	1:47
10.	"In Dreams"	3:26
11.	"Death on the Festival Circuit"	3:15
12.	"M. E. R. C. I."	1:57
13.	"Thief"	2:27
Total length:		43:51

== Personnel ==
- Dan Bejar
- John Collins
- Scott Morgan
- Stephen Wood
- Jason Zumpano
