= Triple point (disambiguation) =

Triple point may refer to:

- Triple point, the temperature and pressure at which an element or compound exists in equilibrium between the solid, liquid, and gaseous phases of matter
- Triple Point (album), a 2001 album by Loscil
- Tri-point or tripoint, the place where three boundaries or territories meet
- Occluded front, the location where a warm front and an occluded front meet during cyclogenesis
