= Bay of Pigs (EP) =

EP by Destroyer
- Released: August 18, 2009
- Genre: Art pop
- Length: 21:27
- Label: Merge

Destroyer chronology
Trouble in Dreams (2008)	Bay of Pigs (2009)	Archer on the Beach (2010)

Professional ratings
Review scores
Source	Rating
Pitchfork	8.0/10 link

Bay of Pigs is an EP by Canadian indie rock band Destroyer, released on August 18, 2009, by Merge Records. The EP's title track was later included, in edited form, as the final track on the band's subsequent studio album, Kaputt.

== Musical style ==
Paul Thompson of Pitchfork described "Bay of Pigs" as starting with "one synth wash over another [...] and a little Spanish guitar", before turning into a disco-style song with an "improbably shimmering guitar" and a "clockwork rhythm". "Ravers" is a slower version of the band's track "Rivers" from Trouble in Dreams. Alex Hudson of Exclaim! magazine stating that Bay of Pigs represented a step in a "dreamy, synth-filled direction" for Dan Bejar's music.

== Track listing ==
=== Vinyl version ===
All tracks are written by Dan Bejar.

Side one
No.	Title	Length
1.	"Bay of Pigs"	13:37

Side two
No.	Title	Length
1.	"Ravers"	7:50

=== Digital version ===
No.	Title	Length
1.	"Bay of Pigs"	13:39
2.	"Ravers"	7:51
Total length:		21:30

== Personnel ==
Credits are adapted from the EP's liner notes.

- Dan Bejar – vocals
- Ted Bois – producer, synthesizer
- Joshua Stevenson – producer, recording
