= Sea Island =

Sea Island may refer to:

- Sea Island (British Columbia), an island in Richmond, British Columbia that contains the Vancouver International Airport
- Sea Island, Georgia, an isolated resort island in Glynn County, Georgia, United States
- Sea Islands, a chain of islands in the Southeastern United States
- Sea Island Cotton, a type of cotton fibre
- Sea Island (album), 2014
- Laut Island, literally translates into 'Sea Island', an island off the southeastern coast of Borneo
