= Lake Fire =

Lake Fire may refer to:

- Lake Fire (2015), a wildfire that burned in the San Bernardino National Forest
- Lake Fire (2020), a wildfire that burned during the 2020 California wildfire season in the Angeles National Forest
- Lake Fire (2024), a large wildfire that burnt 38,664 acres of land in Santa Barbara County
- Lake Fire (album), 2025 album by Loscil
