= Joseph Shabason =

Canadian multi-instrumentalist

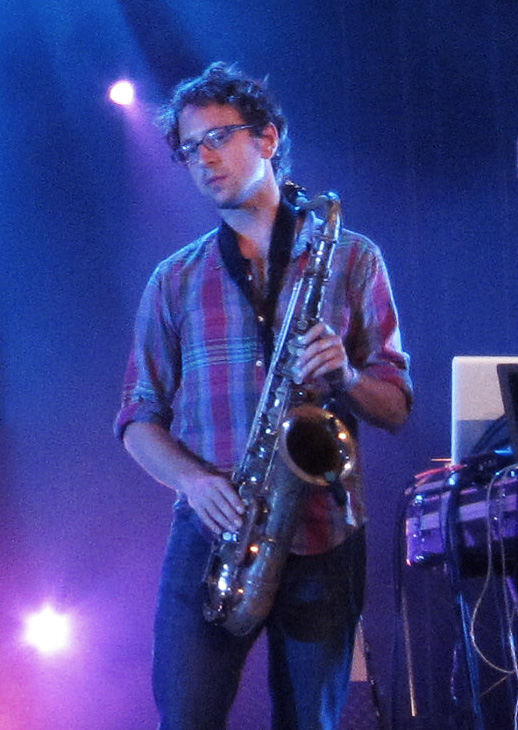
- Shabason playing with Destroyer in 2011

Background information
- Born: 1981 or 1982 (age 44–45)
- Origin: Toronto, Ontario, Canada
- Genres: Jazz, Ambient, Experimental, Indie rock, Synth-pop
- Instruments: Saxophone, flute, clarinet, keyboard
- Label: Western Vinyl
- Website: josephshabason.com

Joseph Shabason is a Canadian multi-instrumentalist and composer. He is best known for playing the saxophone. As a band member and session musician, Shabason has contributed to bands such as DIANA, Destroyer and The War on Drugs. Under his own name, Shabason has released experimental ambient jazz albums as a solo project as well as numerous albums with collaborators.

== Early life and education ==
Shabason was born in 1981 or 1982 and grew up in Bolton, Ontario. He began playing jazz music at 10 years old. After first learning to play the guitar, he took an interest in the saxophone when he enrolled in a jazz program at Humber College as a child. His father was a jazz pianist.

In 2006, he graduated from University of Toronto in jazz performance. His musical focus shifted from jazz to pop in his twenties. Other than some commercial work, Shabason briefly abandoned the saxophone after university—but he's since identified the saxophone as the one instrument he'd bring to a desert island if he could only bring one.

== Work as band member and session musician ==
=== DIANA ===
Shabason is one of three members of DIANA, a Toronto synth-pop band. It formed after another project fell through involving Shabason and Kieran Adams, who met during university.

Its first album, Perpetual Surrender (2013) was longlisted for the Polaris Music Prize. Their second album was Familiar Touch (2016).

=== Destroyer ===
The first Destroyer album to feature Shabason was Kaputt (2010), which was shortlisted for the Polaris Music Prize. Having toured with Destroyer in an opening band, Shabason contacted Destroyer front-man Dan Bejar in 2010 while in Vancouver. This led to Shabason improvising a few hours on the saxophone for the album. His involvement "could not have been more casual," according to Shabason.

Shabason went on to play on Poison Season (2015) and ken (2017), Destroyer's next two albums after Kaputt. Shabason remained an active member of Destroyer between 2010 and 2017. In 2025, he made a guest appearance on the band's fourteenth studio album, Dan's Boogie.

=== The War on Drugs ===
Shabason played an important role in Lost in the Dream (2014) by The War on Drugs.

=== Other ===
As a session musician, Shabason has recorded for many singers and bands—including Born Ruffians, Hannah Georgas, Austra, Jill Barber, Matt Barber, Dragonette, The Operators, Allie X, Peter Elkas, The Fembots and Fucked Up.

Around 2008, Shabason and a friend started a rock band, Everything All the Time. He played keyboard and sang backup vocals.

Another band he played in was called Bass Groove.

== Solo work ==
=== Aytche ===
Aytche (2017)—pronounced like the letter "H"—was his first solo album. It was inspired by composers such as Jon Hassel and Gigi Masin. After the album was finished, Shabason realized that the album reflected the impact that Parkinson's was having in his personal life; his father-in-law was suffering from it and his mother was recently diagnosed.

Only "Westmeath" has vocals. The song features clips from an archival interview from a son of a Holocaust survivor. (Shabason's grandparent were survivors.) A music video for "Westmeath" was directed by Maxwell McCabe-Lokos.

Though Shabason voiced some dissatisfaction with the album, suggesting there was "a lack of vision", it received positive reviews. On Metacritic, the album rated 82 out of 100, indicating "universal acclaim".

The album was funded from a grant by the Ontario Arts Council.

=== Anne and Anne, EP ===
Anne (2018), Shabason's second album, is named after his mother. Focusing on his mother's Parkinson's illness, the album includes audio clips from interviews with her. Shabason was determined that the album not be overly sentimental or exploitative; in his own words, "the challenge becomes how do you take that [interview] and weave it into the fabric of the composition and extract the essence of it without beating people over the head with it." His mother was pleased with the result, calling it a "beautiful album." Critical reception was positive. On Metacritic, the album is rated 77 out of 100, indicating "generally favorable" reviews. Music critic Miles Bowe of Pitchfork called it "gorgeous and empathetic ambient music".

Anne, EP has five songs and was released May 10, 2019. The record label describes the EP as an "afterword" to Anne. Its song "I Don't Want to Be Your Love"—previously a bonus track for Anne—features vocals by Destroyer's Dan Bejar.

=== The Fellowship ===
Shabason's third album was released April 30, 2021. The Fellowship "focuses on Shabason's own past, examining his fraught religious upbringing within—and eventual need to walk away from—an insular Islamic community called The Fellowship." Like his previous two albums, it was critically well received. On Metacritic, the album scored 76 out of 100, indicating "generally favorable" reviews.

=== Welcome to Hell ===
Released October 20, 2023 by labels Western Vinyl and Telephone Explosion Records, this concept album re-scores a 1996 skateboard film with the same name distributed by Toy Machine—a modified version of its logo is used for the album's cover art. Shabason received permission from Toy Machine founder Ed Templeton for the project, and Templeton even supplied the cover art. A video set to the original film was released for the song "Jamie Thomas".

The idea for Welcome to Hell came to Shabason record as he thought about the expression "write what you know." Besides spending summers skateboarding as a kid, he had an interest in skateboard videos at the time he was contemplating a new album. He also wanted to do something "much lighter and joyful" than his previous concept albums. Shabason sees jazz and skateboarding overlapping in that both rely on a progression on players/skaters that have come before and carving out a unique style.

== Collaborations ==
In 2019, Shabason released an experimental ambient album titled Muldrew with Ben Gunning, recorded at a remote location in Northern Ontario.

In 2020, he collaborated with Nicholas Krgovich and Chris Harris on the album Philadelphia, which was a longlisted nominee for the 2021 Polaris Music Prize.

In 2021, Shabason, working again with Nicholas Krgovich and Chris Harris, released the instrumental album Florence. Shabason also composed the musical score of the 2021 dark comedy film Stanleyville.

In 2022, Shabason and Andre Ethier released the collaborative album Fresh Pepper. (Some of Ethier's paintings serve as cover art for Shabason's albums.) At Scaramouche, Shabason's third collaboration with Krgovich, was released in October 2022.

In 2024, the second collaborative LP between Shabason and Ben Gunning was released: Ample Habitat. It was recorded in Shabason's Toronto studio. Also in 2024, the album Shabason, Krgovich, Sage was released in April. Musician M. Sage had invited Shabason and Nicholas Krgovich to collaborate on an album in a barn in Colorado. Speaking about this project, Shabason stated: "As long as we can get into one space together for a short amount of time, the collaborative magic that is needed to make a record is totally possible."

== Discography ==
Here are works released under Shabason's name, including solo work and collaborations. This list does not include any singles.

=== LPs ===
- Aytche (2017)
- Anne (2018)
- Muldrew (2019) (with Ben Gunning)
- Philadelphia (2020) (with Nicholas Krgovich and Chris Harris)
- The Fellowship (2021)
- Florence (2021) (with Nicholas Krgovich and Chris Harris)
- Fresh Pepper (2022) (with André Ethier)
- At Scaramouche (2022) (with Nicholas Krgovich)
- Welcome to Hell (2023)
- Ample Habitat (2024) (with Ben Gunning)
- Shabason, Krgovich, Sage (2024) (with Nicholas Krgovich and M. Sage)

=== EPs ===
- Anne EP (2019)
- Fly Me to the Moon (2022) (with Vibrant Matter)
- One for the Money (2023) (with Thom Gill)

=== Official soundtracks ===
- Stanleyville Original Motion Picture Soundtrack (2022)
- Gimme Truth (2026)
