= City of Daughters =

Studio album by Destroyer
- Released: June 1, 1998
- Recorded: 1998
- Genre: Space rock, indie rock
- Length: 38:36
- Label: Triple Crown Audio/Endearing

Destroyer chronology
Ideas for Songs (1997)	City of Daughters (1998)	Thief (2000)

Professional ratings
Review scores
Source	Rating
AllMusic	3/5 stars
Pitchfork	7.1/10

City of Daughters is the second studio album by Destroyer, released in June 1998.

Pitchfork Media listed City of Daughters as 86th best album of the 1990s.

== Track listing ==
All tracks are written by Dan Bejar

No.	Title	Length
1.	"Comments on the World as Will"	0:56
2.	"No Cease Fires! (Crimes Against the State of Our Love, Baby)"	3:30
3.	"Dark Purposes"	2:15
4.	"Emax I"	1:46
5.	"I Want This Cyclops"	3:13
6.	"Loves of a Gnostic"	2:38
7.	"Emax II"	0:57
8.	"State of the Union"	1:17
9.	"School, and the Girls Who Go There"	2:51
10.	"The Space Race"	2:22
11.	"Melanie and Jennifer and Melanie"	3:59
12.	"War on Jazz II or How I Learned to Love the War on Jazz"	1:54
13.	"Emax III"	0:59
14.	"You Were So Cruel"	3:34
15.	"Signs"	0:47
16.	"Rereading the Marble Faun"	3:15
17.	"Son of the Earth"	2:13
Total length:		38:36

== Personnel ==
- Dan Bejar - Guitar, Synthesizer, Vocals
- John Collins - Bass, Synthesizer, technology, Ambiance
- Scott Morgan - Drums, saxophone, clarinet
- David James - technology on "Space Race"
