= Streethawk: A Seduction =

Studio album by Destroyer
- Released: April 24, 2001
- Recorded: Fall 2000
- Genre: Indie rock
- Length: 43:51
- Labels: Misra/Talitres; Merge (reissue)
- Producer: John Collins/David Carswell

Destroyer chronology
Thief (2000)	Streethawk: A Seduction (2001)	This Night (2002)

Alternative cover
- 2010 reissue cover

Streethawk: A Seduction is the fourth studio album by Destroyer, recorded in the fall of 2000 and released on April 24, 2001. It was recorded at JC/DC Studios and produced by JC/DC. It was reissued in 2010 on Merge Records (MRG373).

== Critical reception ==
Professional ratings
Review scores
Source	Rating
AllMusic	4/5 stars
Alternative Press	6/10
Pitchfork	9.1/10
Stylus Magazine	A

Streethawk: A Seduction received largely positive reviews from music critics. Paul Thompson of Pitchfork gave the album a very positive review, calling it "a record of practically nothing but graceful abandon. Each line seems immaculately crafted, every note falling into perfect order, every word sung with the proper bite and bile. This is what Bejar was building to, why he became a songwriter in the first place, and he reaches quite a precipice. Songs move effortlessly between bits of received wisdom, the drama is amped up to almost unthinkable levels, and these tunes feel like a long series of exclamation points. The guy got really good really fast, and he knew it-- his wit is sharp, his observations are keen, and his gaze is withering."

== Track listing ==
All tracks are written by Dan Bejar.

No.	Title	Length
1.	"Streethawk I"	2:25
2.	"The Bad Arts"	7:01
3.	"Beggars Might Ride"	2:45
4.	"The Sublimation Hour"	4:11
5.	"English Music"	3:34
6.	"Virgin with a Memory"	2:40
7.	"The Very Modern Dance"	3:13
8.	"The Crossover"	5:03
9.	"Helena"	3:45
10.	"Farrar, Straus & Giroux (Sea of Tears)"	3:47
11.	"Strike"	2:58
12.	"Streethawk II"	2:29
Total length:		43:51

== Personnel ==
- Dan Bejar
- John Collins
- Scott Morgan
- Stephen Wood
- Jason Zumpano
