= Labyrinthitis (album) =

Studio album by Destroyer
- Released: March 25, 2022
- Recorded: Winter/Spring 2021
- Length: 43:48
- Labels: Merge; Bella Union
- Producer: John Collins

Destroyer chronology
Have We Met (2020)	Labyrinthitis (2022)	Dan's Boogie (2025)

Singles from Labyrinthitis
- 1. "Tintoretto, It's for You" Released: January 11, 2022; 2. "Eat the Wine, Drink the Bread" Released: February 14, 2022; 3. "June" Released: March 9, 2022

Labyrinthitis (stylized in all caps) is the thirteenth studio album by Canadian indie rock band Destroyer, released on March 25, 2022, by Merge Records and Bella Union.

== Background and recording ==
Labyrinthitis was created by frontman Dan Bejar with longtime collaborator and producer John Collins and the Destroyer band. The album was primarily written in 2020 and recorded in winter/spring 2021. Bejar worked remotely from his home in Vancouver and Collins on Galiano Island, with the two sending ideas to each other from their respective locations.

== Release ==
The album was announced on January 11, 2022, and "Tintoretto, It's for You" was released as its first single with an accompanying music video directed by David Galloway. "Eat the Wine, Drink the Bread" was released as the album's second single on February 14, 2022. "June" was released as the album's third single on March 9, 2022, accompanied by a music video co-directed by Galloway and Bejar.

== Critical reception ==
Professional ratings
Aggregate scores
Source	Rating
Metacritic	82/100
Review scores
Source	Rating
AllMusic	4/5 stars
Beats Per Minute	85%
Financial Times	3/5 stars
Mojo	4/5 stars
MusicOMH	4.5/5 stars
The Observer	3/5 stars
Pitchfork	8.5/10
PopMatters	9/10
Rolling Stone	3.5/5 stars
Uncut	7/10

Fred Thomas, in his review for AllMusic, called the album "another exciting step forward in Destroyer's never-ending evolution, delivering pleasant confusion and unexpected choices along with the kind of fractured but magical songwriting of which only Bejar is capable." In a review for Pitchfork, Andy Cush praised the album's complexity.

The album was shortlisted for the 2022 Polaris Music Prize.

=== Year-end lists ===
Labyrinthitis on year-end lists
Publication	List	Rank	Ref.
Pitchfork	The 50 Best Albums of 2022	30	

== Track listing ==
No.	Title	Length
1.	"It's in Your Heart Now"	6:09
2.	"Suffer"	3:29
3.	"June"	6:33
4.	"All My Pretty Dresses"	4:40
5.	"Tintoretto, It's for You"	3:05
6.	"Labyrinthitis"	3:19
7.	"Eat the Wine, Drink the Bread"	3:37
8.	"It Takes a Thief"	2:41
9.	"The States"	6:55
10.	"The Last Song"	2:34
Total length:		43:48

== Personnel ==
Destroyer

- Dan Bejar – vocals, synthesizer, guitar
- John Collins – bass, synthesizer, guitar, drum programming, production, mixing
- Ted Bois – piano, synthesizer, photography
- Nicolas Bragg – guitar
- David Carswell – guitar
- JP Carter – trumpet
- Joshua Wells – drums, percussion

Additional personnel

- Joe LaPorta – mastering
- Sydney Hermant – cover painting
- Daniel Murphy – design

== Charts ==
Chart performance for Labyrinthitis
Chart (2022)	Peak position
UK Album Downloads (Official Charts)	82
