= Seabuckthorn (musician) =

English Musician

Andy Cartwright
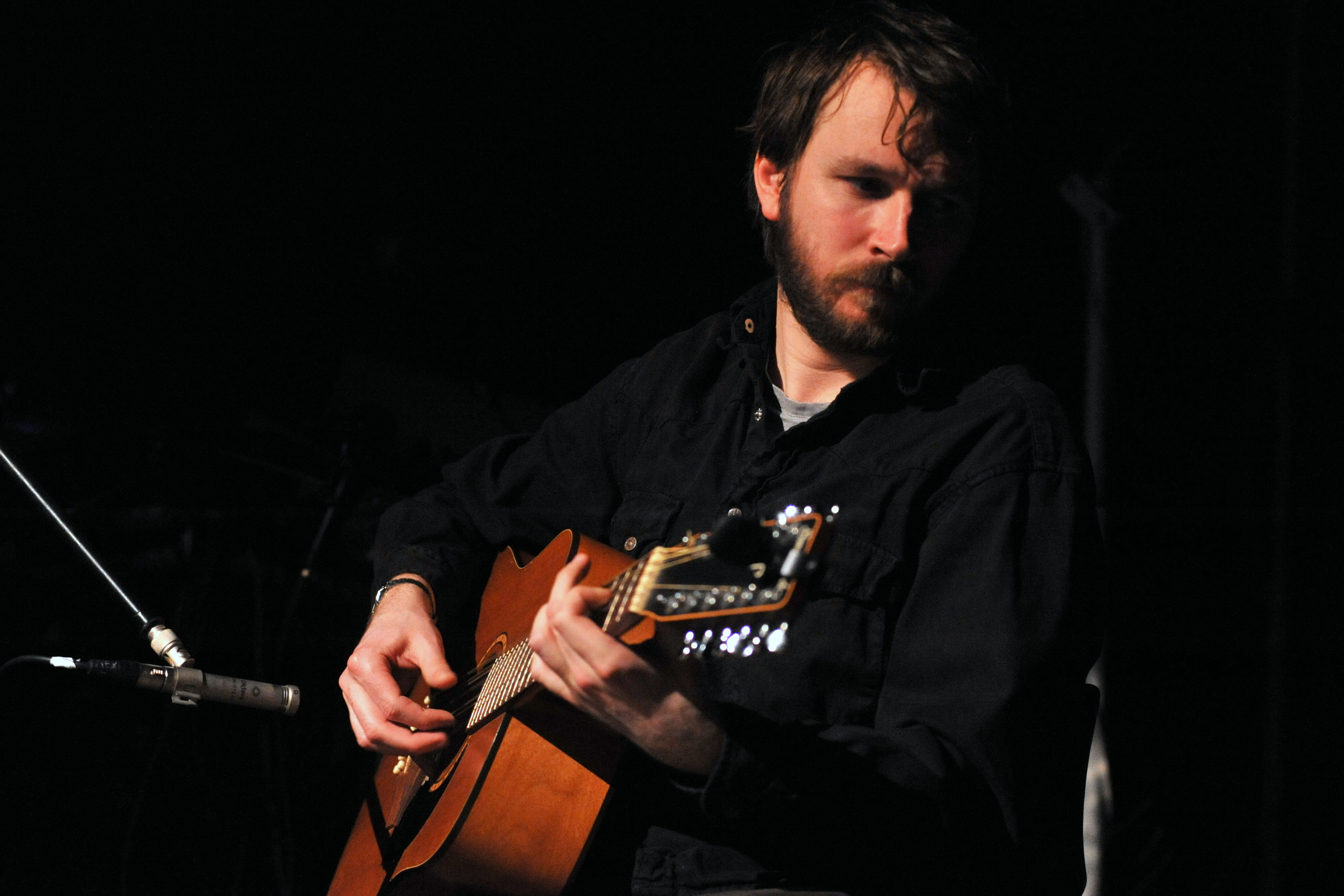
- Playing at Festival Hibernarock, Saint-flour, France, in 2017

Background information
- Also known as: Seabuckthorn
- Origin: Witney, England
- Genres: Experimental, Folk, Ambient
- Years active: 2008–present
- Labels: Bookmaker Records; Lost Tribe Sound; Fluid Audio; Thesis; IIKKI; LAAPS; Eilean Rec; Quiet Details
- Website: https://seabuckthorn-music.com/

Andy Cartwright, known professionally as Seabuckthorn, is an English guitarist and producer, based in France. As Seabuckthorn, he has released a number of albums of primarily guitar-based instrumental music with folk and contemporary influences.

== Career ==
Cartwright began releasing music as Seabuckthorn in 2008, self-publishing collections of tracks on home-made CDs, with his first album on a label coming in 2011 in the form of In Nightfall, a mini-album released by France-based Bookmaker Records. At that time, a reviewer for the local music magazine Nightshift compared his work to that of Alexander Tucker and Matt Elliott, describing it as "avant-garde guitar" instrumental music, constructed from layered acoustic tracks, arpeggiated arrangements and "almost sitar-esque" drones, producing an eerie atmosphere, and commented that the pieces are well-constructed but lack striking melodies.

The album The Silence Woke Me came the following year, also under Bookmaker, and was described by Nightshift's Tom McKibbin as more rhythmically involved and hook-based. Cartwright was recording and mixing his next album (third under Bookmaker and fifth overall) – They Haunted Most Thickly – for two years before its 2015 release. According to him as cited on the label's website, it is a "collection of songs played mainly on an open C tuned resonator guitar & an open A tuned 12-string acoustic guitar".

The music on Cartwright's 2016 EP, I Could See the Smoke was also played using the 12-string and resonator guitar, with percussion. The production features "ghost voices [that] float across the top of everything, eerie wails and moans" according to Cyclic Defrost's Lachlan Wrong. He further described the direction as "murky" and "dense", and the material as demanding, noting that studio techniques were used to alter the sound of instruments, sometimes beyond recognition, including guitars "resembling a violin or viola". It was released on the American label Lost Tribe Sound, and was recorded following a 2016 European tour. Subsequently, the 2017 Seabuckthorn album Turns was released by the same label. On three of the songs, he was joined on double bass by a label mate – American composer and producer William Ryan Fritch. Describing the music's broadly folk style, Exclaim!'s Scott A. Gray noted neo-classical and post-rock elements, and identified the sounds of Americana, classical music and drones of Asian music in Cartwright's guitar approach. Following up on his review of the 2016 EP, Wrong wrote of a "cleaner and brighter sound" and an "airier and more relaxed approach to playing and composition", and stated that the songs have a greater sense of resolution. The album's mastering was done by James Plotkin and the cover by Gregory Euclide.

In 2017, an EP with Loscil was released by the label Thesis.

His later recordings have been released by labels including LAAPS, IIKKI, Eilean Rec, Fluid Audio and Quiet Details.

Cartwright also releases electronic music under his own name, as well as making music for use in film, documentaries, websites and contemporary dance.

== Personal life ==
Cartwright was born near Oxford and moved to the town of Saint-Pierre-d'Argençon in the Southern French Alps.

== Discography ==
=== Full-length albums ===
- Distant Summer Storm (2009, self-released)
- A Mantra Pulled Apart (2010, self-released)
- The Silence Woke Me (2012, Bookmaker Records)
- They Haunted Most Thickly (2015, Bookmaker Records)
- Turns (2017, Lost Tribe Sound)
- A House With Too Much Fire (2018, Bookmaker Records/La Cordillere)
- Crossing (2019, Eilean Rec)
- Through A Vulnerable Occur (2020, IIKKI)
- Other Other (2020, Fluid Audio)
- Of No Such Place (2022, LAAPS)
- Inlandscape (2023, Fluid Audio)
- This Warm, This Late (2024, Quiet Details)
- A Path Within A Path (2025, LAAPS)

=== Mini-albums, EPs and splits ===
- Twilight Synopsis (2008, self-released; EP)
- In Nightfall (2011, Bookmaker Records; mini album)
- I Could See The Smoke (2016, Lost Tribe Sound; EP)
- Loscil & Seabuckthorn Collaboration (2017, THESIS; EP)
- Dean Mcphee & Seabuckthorn Split (2017, Sonido Polifonico; split single)
- And Spark And Singe (2021; EP)
