= Triple Point (album) =

Studio album by Loscil
- Released: October 8, 2001
- Genre: Ambient techno
- Length: 59:12
- Label: Kranky
- Producer: Scott Morgan

Loscil chronology
A New Demonstration of Thermodynamic Tendencies (1999)	Triple Point (2001)	Submers (2002)

Triple Point is a studio album by Canadian composer and record producer Scott Morgan under the pseudonym Loscil. It was released on October 8, 2001, through Kranky.

== Background ==
Scott Morgan, also known as Loscil, is a Canadian composer and record producer. After releasing a demo called A New Demonstration of Thermodynamic Tendencies in 1999, he got signed to the record label Kranky. Triple Point is the first official Loscil album. It is based on "the concepts of thermodynamics, the physical science which investigates the conversion of heat into mechanical force or energy and vice versa." The album was released on October 8, 2001, through Kranky. A vinyl edition of the album was released in 2024, with the addition of three bonus tracks.

== Critical reception ==
Professional ratings
Review scores
Source	Rating
AllMusic	4/5 stars
Pitchfork	6.9/10

I. Khider of Exclaim! wrote, "Triple Point has its strengths, since it could function as both sedated house music or rhythmic ambient." James Beaudreau of PopMatters commented that "the record has an unusually unified and focused sound." Andy Kellman of AllMusic described the album as "one of the finest -- and most varied -- ambient techno releases of 2001."

== Track listing ==
All tracks are written by Scott Morgan.

Triple Point (CD edition) track listing
No.	Title	Length
1.	"Hydrogen"	3:35
2.	"Ampere"	7:27
3.	"Pressure"	4:32
4.	"Zero"	4:13
5.	"Discrete Entropy"	5:20
6.	"Fuel Exergy"	6:00
7.	"Enthalpy"	5:01
8.	"Conductivity"	7:37
9.	"Vapour"	5:08
10.	"Absolute"	9:57
Total length:		59:12

Triple Point (vinyl edition) track listing
No.	Title	Length
1.	"Hydrogen"	3:35
2.	"Ampere"	7:27
3.	"Pressure"	4:32
4.	"Zero"	4:13
5.	"Discrete Entropy"	5:20
6.	"Fuel Exergy"	6:00
7.	"Enthalpy"	5:01
8.	"Conductivity"	7:37
9.	"Vapour"	5:08
10.	"Third Law"	5:34
11.	"Steady State"	3:12
12.	"P Motion"	5:53
13.	"Absolute"	9:57
Total length:		73:29

== Personnel ==
Credits adapted from liner notes.

- Scott Morgan – production
- Keith Laidman – design
- Craig McCaffrey – design (vinyl edition)
