= Ideas for Songs =

Compilation album by Destroyer
- Released: 1997; 2011 (Reissue)
- Genre: Indie rock
- Label: Granted Passage Cassettes, Triple Crown Recordings of Canada

Destroyer chronology
| We'll Build Them a Golden Bridge (1996) | Ideas for Songs (1997) | City of Daughters (1998) |

Ideas for Songs is a cassette by Destroyer, released in 1997. The tape was a result of Dan Bejar being asked to contribute a song under the Destroyer moniker for a various artists compilation being curated at that time. As a response he submitted a cassette with 20 songs for them to choose from. The original 20 songs were pared down to 16 and then pressed as "Ideas For Songs" by Granted Passage Cassettes.

The cover art features the 1977 painting Imperial Nude: Paul Rosano by the artist Sylvia Sleigh. Ideas for Songs was reissued by Triple Crown Recordings of Canada (formerly known as Granted Passage Cassettes) on vinyl on April 5, 2011. It was also made available digitally on iTunes Store.

== Track listing ==
=== Side A ===
1. "A Month in the Country – 2:06
2. "Song about Disappointment - 1:56
3. "Spring Cleaning - 2:20
4. "No One Needs to Know - 3:14
5. "Death to the Northern Man - 2:03
6. "Child of Styx - 2:28
7. "Marrying the Hammer - 1:36
8. "Nothing Against You (Bored Spectre) - 3:42

=== Side B ===
1. "Song about a Girl up to a Point" – 1:31
2. "The Terror Serves a Purpose" – 2:42
3. "Leaving London" – 1:38
4. "Untitled" – 2:50
5. "Forget America" – 1:06
6. "Stuffed and Sick" – 1:29
7. "The Leg We Stand On" – 2:33
8. "Why Banacek Doesn't Love" – 5:24

=== Unused tracks ===
1. "You Can't Go Home Again"
2. "It Is Me Who Will Rate You"
3. "These Times"

== Personnel ==
- Dan Bejar - Vocals, Acoustic guitar
