= Endless Falls =

Studio album by Loscil
- Released: March 2, 2010
- Genre: Ambient
- Length: 61:56
- Label: Kranky
- Producer: Scott Morgan

Loscil chronology
Plume (2006)	Endless Falls (2010)	Coast / Range / Arc (2011)

Endless Falls is a studio album by Canadian composer and record producer Scott Morgan under the pseudonym Loscil. It was released on March 2, 2010, through Kranky. It received generally favorable reviews from critics.

== Background ==
Endless Falls is Loscil's first studio album since Plume (2006). It is his fifth studio album for Kranky. Daniel Bejar of Destroyer provides guest vocals on the album's final song "The Making of Grief Point". The album also features contributions from Kim Koch (on violin), Robert Sparks (on violin and bass recorder), and Jason Zumpano (on piano).

== Critical reception ==
Professional ratings
Aggregate scores
Source	Rating
Metacritic	80/100
Review scores
Source	Rating
AllMusic	4/5 stars
Cokemachineglow	77%
Pitchfork	7.5/10
PopMatters	8/10 stars
Spectrum Culture	3.5/5
Tiny Mix Tapes	3.5/5 stars

According to the review aggregator Metacritic, Endless Falls received "generally favorable reviews" based on a weighted average score of 80 out of 100 from 8 critic scores.

Brock Thiessen of Exclaim! described the album as "one minimal and slow-moving piece of work, littered here and there with dub rhythms, piano keys and crackling glitches." Joe Colly of Pitchfork stated, "At its most basic, the idea here is that Endless Falls is a rainy-day album, overcast but cozy, and there's an aquatic theme that extends to its cover art and the rain-droplet field recordings that bookend the record." He added, "Morgan plays with the idea of water-as-sound throughout and pulls it off in appealing ways."

Heather Phares of AllMusic commented that "Endless Falls' mix of old and new maintains Morgan's reputation as one of the most consistent, and consistently interesting, producers out there." Ian Mathers of PopMatters stated, "There's something appealing to art that suggests without dictating answers, and there's little to indicate that finding out what Morgan is actually up to would improve or change the richly textured, dubby ambience of his music."

John Mulvey of Uncut placed Endless Falls at number 52 on his list of "The Wild Mercury Sound 100 of 2010".

== Track listing ==
All tracks are written by Scott Morgan, except the lyrics on "The Making of Grief Point" by Daniel Bejar.

Endless Falls track listing
No.	Title	Length
1.	"Endless Falls"	7:55
2.	"Estuarine"	8:20
3.	"Shallow Water Blackout"	7:07
4.	"Dub for Cascadia"	6:06
5.	"Fern and Robin"	7:11
6.	"Lake Orchard"	7:40
7.	"Showers of Ink"	8:43
8.	"The Making of Grief Point"	8:54
Total length:		61:56

== Personnel ==
Credits adapted from liner notes.

- Scott Morgan – music, lap steel guitar (6)
- Kim Koch – violin (1)
- Robert Sparks – violin (1), bass recorder (5)
- Jason Zumpano – piano (2, 8)
- Daniel Bejar – vocals (8)
- Sadie Fern Morgan Marshall – cover photography
