= Plume (Loscil album) =

Studio album by Loscil
- Released: May 22, 2006
- Genre: Ambient techno
- Length: 62:41
- Label: Kranky
- Producer: Scott Morgan

Loscil chronology
First Narrows (2004)	Plume (2006)	Endless Falls (2010)

Plume is a studio album by Canadian composer and record producer Scott Morgan under the alias Loscil. It was released on May 22, 2006, through Kranky.

== Background ==
Plume is Loscil's fourth studio album for Kranky. It features contributions from Josh August Lindstrom (on vibraphone and xylophone), Krista Michelle Marshall (on guitar), Jason Anthony Zumpano (on Rhodes piano), and Stephen Michael Wood (on guitar).

== Release ==
Plume was originally released on May 22, 2006, through Kranky. The vinyl version of the album was released on October 16, 2015, through the same label.

== Critical reception ==
Professional ratings
Review scores
Source	Rating
AllMusic	3.5/5 stars
Cokemachineglow	70%
Pitchfork	5.6/10
Tiny Mix Tapes	3.5/5 marks

Fred Miketa of XLR8R stated, "Composed with perfect amounts of subtle delay, layer upon layer of blissful chimes, and plenty of space, Plume makes for a quintessential escape from life's daily rushes." Rob Theakston of AllMusic commented that "The band are disciplined in their freedom, playing melodic passages with sparseness and attention to timing." Seth K of Tiny Mix Tapes stated, "Plume is humbled by its players' subtlety, and although they're each going through their own self-sustained process, their instruments intertwine beautifully with one another, making their individuality invisible."

Meanwhile, Mark Abraham of Cokemachineglow commented that "Plume's success hinges on a brilliant idea, but it doesn't quite succeed on finding many different ways to explore the tension created between the extremes it tries to meld together, whatever you call them." Mark Richardson of Pitchfork stated, "Plume is certainly a nice-enough record, but it also seems like the kind of music Morgan could do well until the end of time."

== In other media ==
The album's song "Rorschach" was used in the 2009 video game Osmos.

== Track listing ==
All tracks are written by Scott Morgan.

Plume track listing
No.	Title	Length
1.	"Motoc"	6:29
2.	"Rorschach"	8:20
3.	"Zephyr"	5:19
4.	"Steam"	6:59
5.	"Chinook"	6:55
6.	"Bellows"	6:57
7.	"Halcyon"	7:22
8.	"Charlie"	8:49
9.	"Mistral"	6:01
Total length:		62:41

== Personnel ==
Credits adapted from liner notes.

- Scott Morgan – music
- Josh August Lindstrom – vibraphone (1, 3, 5, 7–9), xylophone (1, 3, 5, 7–9)
- Krista Michelle Marshall – guitar (2)
- Jason Anthony Zumpano – Rhodes piano (2–4, 9)
- Stephen Michael Wood – guitar (3, 8)
- Mark Mushet – photography
