= Hello, Blue Roses =

Canadian musical duo

- Origin: Vancouver, British Columbia, Canada
- Years active: 2008–present
- Labels: Locust Music
- Members: Dan Bejar; Sydney Hermant

Hello, Blue Roses is a Canadian musical collaboration involving Sydney Hermant, a visual artist from Vancouver, and her husband Dan Bejar (of Destroyer and The New Pornographers).

== History ==
Hello, Blue Roses was created by Hermant and Bejar in 2008. Their name is a reference to a line from Tennessee William's The Glass Menagerie. They released their debut album, The Portrait Is Finished and I Have Failed to Capture Your Beauty..., in 2008 through by Locust Music.

In February, 2015 the pair released a second album, WZO, through JAZ Records. Most of the songs were written by Hermant. It was distributed as both a digital download and limited-edition vinyl LP.

== Discography ==
=== The Portrait Is Finished and I Have Failed to Capture Your Beauty... Track listing ===
1. "Hello Blue Roses" - 2:35
2. "Scarecrow" - 2:21
3. "Paquita Reads by Candlelight" - 1:05
4. "Shadow Falls" - 3:10
5. "Heron Song" - 3:03
6. "St. Angela" - 4:43
7. "Coming Through Imposture" - 2:31
8. "Golden Fruit" - 2:45
9. "Come Darkness" - 2:32
10. "Sunny Skies" - 3:05
11. "Mediterranean Snow" - 2:34
12. "Skeleton Aim" - 2:11
13. "Sickly Star" - 2:32
14. "Hymn" - 4:28

=== WZO Track listing ===
1. "Amulet" - 2:56
2. "Telepathy" - 01:47
3. "Errant Sophia" - 02:53
4. "Brutalist Brick" - 04:01
5. "Wild Reed (A Crone's Advice to Her Daughter, Wild Reed)" - 03:46
6. "Crashing" - 02:24
7. "Wading Pools" - 01:59
8. "Ghosts" - 03:23
9. "Alizarian Cream" - 02:06
10. "Speak To Me" - 03:18
