= This Night (album) =

Studio album by Destroyer
- Released: October 2, 2002
- Genre: Indie rock
- Length: 68:02
- Label: Merge

Destroyer chronology
Streethawk: A Seduction (2001)	This Night (2002)	Your Blues (2004)

Professional ratings
Review scores
Source	Rating
AllMusic	4/5 stars
Pitchfork	4.4/10

This Night is the fifth studio album by Destroyer, released on October 2, 2002. It was their first on Merge Records. Most of the material was written in Madrid, where Dan Bejar went to sidestep a tour with The New Pornographers, following the critical success of that supergroup's first album.

The song, "Hey, Snow White" was covered by The New Pornographers, whose version appears on Dark Was the Night.

== Track listing ==
All tracks are written by Dan Bejar.

No.	Title	Length
1.	"This Night"	5:57
2.	"Holly Going Lightly"	5:08
3.	"Here Comes the Night"	6:35
4.	"The Chosen Few"	3:59
5.	"Makin' Angels"	4:14
6.	"Hey, Snow White"	7:54
7.	"Modern Painters"	3:00
8.	"Crystal Country"	3:44
9.	"Trembling Peacock"	4:16
10.	"I Have Seen a Light"	5:06
11.	"Students Carve Hearts out of Coal"	3:46
12.	"Goddess of Drought"	3:31
13.	"Self Portrait with Thing (Tonight Is Not Your Night)"	6:26
14.	"The Relevant Ballads"	0:37
15.	"The Night Moves"	3:49
Total length:		68:02

== Personnel ==
- Dan Bejar
- Nicholas Bragg
- Chris Frey
- Fisher Rose
