= Five Spanish Songs =

EP by Destroyer
- Released: November 26, 2013
- Studios: JC/DC, Vancouver, British Columbia, Canada
- Genres: Indie rock; indie folk
- Length: 19:28
- Language: Spanish
- Labels: Merge; Dead Oceans
- Producer: JC/DC

Destroyer chronology
Kaputt (2011)	Five Spanish Songs (2013)	Poison Season (2015)

Five Spanish Songs is a Spanish language EP by Canadian indie rock band Destroyer. It was released on November 26, 2013, via Merge Records and on December 2, 2013, via Dead Oceans in Europe.

The album was streamed via Hype Machine on November 22, 2013.

== Background ==
The EP consists of five songs entirely sung in Spanish. The songs were originally written by Spanish musician Antonio Luque and performed by his band, Sr. Chinarro. The EP also features contributions from fellow musicians Nicolas Bragg, Stephen Hamm, Josh Wells, along with John Collins and David Carswell, who also produced the record.

On his decision to record the EP in Spanish, the frontman Dan Bejar stated:

"It was 2013. The English language seemed spent, despicable, not easily singable. It felt over for English; good for business transactions, but that's about it. The only other language I know is Spanish, and the only Spanish songs I really know are those of Sr. Chinarro, led by Antonio Luque. I've been a decades-long fan of how he conducted his affairs, his strange words, his melodies that have always felt so natural (this is important), his bitter songs about painting the light. Something about them, I knew I could do it..."

Also in an interview with The Quietus, Bejar expanded his opinions about the EP:

"I guess I wanted to step outside of myself for a little while. I wanted to see if I could sing other people's songs. But in English I've had a very hard time of it, I don't know why. I wanted to make music that was relatively straightforward in its intent, I think that was behind most of these interpretations. It was all made very quickly, just enjoying the act of making music, messing around in the studio, not labouring over decisions, going in and walking out with a little record after a couple weeks. The antithesis of Kaputt."

== Critical reception ==
Professional ratings
Aggregate scores
Source	Rating
Metacritic	75/100
Review scores
Source	Rating
Consequence of Sound	4/5 stars
Drowned in Sound	8/10
Exclaim!	6/10
NME	8/10
Now	4/5 stars
Pitchfork	7.9/10
The Skinny	3/5 stars

Stuart Berman of Pitchfork gave the EP a positive review. While he saw the album as an "opportunity for Bejar to celebrate his own Spanish heritage," he also stated: "To that end, even if your familiarity with Spanish doesn’t extend beyond reading the menu at your local taco joint, the experience of listening to Five Spanish Songs is really no different than that of any other Destroyer record."

Michael Edwards of Exclaim! wrote: "Five Spanish Songs is satisfying enough for its 20-minute runtime, but it definitely lacks the heft of his recent work; without his distinctive lyrics, it doesn't really feel like proper Destroyer." A similar point of view was also shared by Chris Buckle of The Skinny, who stated: "With Dan Bejar’s piquant way with words a substantial part of Destroyer’s appeal, Five Spanish Songs may herald disappointment for those who don’t share the Canadian’s bilingual abilities."

== Track listing ==
All tracks are written by Antonio Luque.

No.	Title	Length
1.	"Maria de las Nieves"	4:48
2.	"Del montón"	2:32
3.	"El rito"	3:35
4.	"Babieca"	5:33
5.	"Bye Bye"	3:00
Total length:		19:28

== Charts ==
Chart (2013)	Peak position
US Top Latin Albums (Billboard)	20
US Latin Pop Albums (Billboard)	6

== Personnel ==
- John Collins – piano, synthesizer, drums, percussion
- Daniel Bejar – vocals, acoustic guitar, piano, synthesizer
- David Carswell – acoustic guitar, electric guitar, drums, percussion, production
- Nicolas Bragg – electric guitar
