= Notorious Lightning & Other Works =

Notorious Lightning and Other Works

EP by Destroyer
- Released: January 25, 2005
- Genre: Indie rock
- Length: 27:27
- Label: Merge

Destroyer chronology
Your Blues (2004)	Notorious Lightning and Other Works (2005)	Destroyer's Rubies (2006)

Professional ratings
Review scores
Source	Rating
Pitchfork	6.8/10

Notorious Lightning and Other Works is an EP by Destroyer, released on January 25, 2005, on Merge Records. After shocking many fans by supporting the synth-driven album Your Blues with the avant-guitar band Frog Eyes, Dan Bejar decided to put to tape some of the very different versions of songs from Your Blues.

== Track listing ==
All tracks are written by Dan Bejar.

No.	Title	Length
1.	"Notorious Lightning"	9:51
2.	"New Ways of Living"	3:21
3.	"The Music Lovers"	4:41
4.	"An Actor's Revenge"	2:55
5.	"Don't Become the Thing You Hated"	3:07
6.	"Your Blues"	3:32
Total length:		27:27

== Personnel ==
- Dan Bejar
- Carey Mercer
- Melanie Campbell
- Michael Rak
- Grayson Walker
