= Diana (band) =

Canadian synthpop band

- Origin: Toronto, Ontario, Canada
- Genres: Indie pop, synthpop, chillwave
- Years active: 2010s–present
- Labels: Paper Bag Records, Jagjaguwar, Culvert Music
- Members: Joseph Shabason; Kieran Adams; Carmen Elle
- Website: dianatheband.com

DIANA is a Canadian synthpop band, consisting of Carmen Elle (vocals), Joseph Shabason (keyboards) and Kieran Adams (drums). Their debut album Perpetual Surrender was a longlisted nominee for the 2014 Polaris Music Prize. It was followed by their second album Familiar Touch in November 2016.

== History ==
Formed by Toronto musicians Joseph Shabason and Kieran Adams after another project they had planned to work on fell through, the duo later added vocalist Carmen Elle. Originally intended as a recording project which would not tour, popular interest in their early demos on SoundCloud led them to begin touring, with Paul Mathew also joining the band's live performance lineup.

Perpetual Surrender was released in August 2013 on Paper Bag Records and Jagjaguwar. They have toured extensively across Canada, the United States and the United Kingdom to support the album, both at music festivals and as an opening act for Austra.

In November 2016, they released the album Familiar Touch.

Elle is also a member of Army Girls and has played with Austra and Moon King.

== Discography ==
- Perpetual Surrender (2013)
- Familiar Touch (2016)
