= Ken (album) =

Studio album by Destroyer
- Released: October 20, 2017
- Genres: Indie rock; new wave; jazz rock
- Length: 39:42
- Label: Merge
- Producer: Josh Wells

Destroyer chronology
Poison Season (2015)	Ken (2017)	Have We Met (2020)

Ken (stylized in all lowercase) is the eleventh studio album by Canadian indie rock band Destroyer, released on October 20, 2017 by Merge Records. Band Leader Dan Bejar began writing ken while on tour in Washington State. Many of the songs and sounds of the album were aesthetic callbacks to Bejar's teenage years in the mid 1980's, with loose ties to Thatcher era politics.

== Background ==
Band leader Dan Bejar "lifted" the name ken from an early version of the song "The Wild Ones" by Suede. Despite sharing a title, Bejar claims that he "was not thinking about Suede when making this record" and that it was "unclear to me what that purpose is, or what the connection is". Unlike previous records, Poison Season and Kaputt, Bejar composed most of the songs on guitar rather than on a computer. The majority of the songs on ken were written and debuted live while Bejar was touring in early 2017. In an interview with Spin magazine, Bejar stated that recording ken felt like "singing to my teenage self" and was heavily influenced by the bands House of Love, and The Church. Bejar characterizes ken as the first record where "a producer swept in," stating that many of the drum machines, minimalist rhythms, and synth patterns on tracks like "Sky's Grey" "came as a surprise to me." The song “La Regle du Jeu” became more "euro-cabaret" in the studios compared to the original demo, with Bejar commenting "All of a sudden, the song had way more fangs than I had ever imagined."

== Lyrics ==
Bejar stated that ken is influenced by the "casual extremism of a young person" and his personality as a teenager while writing ken. Each song blends the themes of "madness, or disease, or violence, or decadence and depravity" that were present on other Destroyer albums, but "seem to be more constant on this album." In a press release for the album, Bejar stated that he was thinking about his experience with music leading up to the resignation of Margaret Thatcher as Prime Minister of Great Britain while writing ken. The opening track "Sky's Grey" is Bejar's self-described "sort of state of the union address" for "Destroyer-world." Likening it to the ending of the film The Seventh Seal, the lyric from "Sky's Grey", "I've been working on the new Oliver Twist" is described by Bejar as "a fool’s errand" or "antidote" in the midst of "dreariness and collapse." The song "In the Morning", borrows lyrics from the Debarge song, "Rhythm of The Night", in the verse "bands sing their songs and then disappear into the rhythm of the night." Bejar partially based the song "Saw You at the Hospital" off his three-day stay in a Swiss hospital with pneumonia during the tour for Poison Season. A few lyrics written in that time made it on to the record. However, a lot of the original material was scrapped when Bejar decided to take the song in a more surrealist direction. Despite sharing its name with the French film La Règle Du Jeu directed by Jean Renoir, Bejar stated that the song "La Règle Du Jeu" was not inspired by the work, but rather that he liked saying the title.

== Release ==
Destroyer announced the album on August 8, 2017, including the release of the first song from the album, "Sky's Grey", by way of a lyric video posted to YouTube. The album's release date, track list, and artwork were announced the same day. A music video for the song "Tinseltown Swimming in Blood" directed by Karen Zolo and starring Bejar was released on September 21, 2017. Despite the minimal style of ken, Bejar toured with his 8-piece band, claiming "I think of the songs will lend themselves well to being blown-out and put through the wringer by us." A deluxe edition also features acoustic versions of "A Light Travels Down the Catwalk" and "Stay Lost."

== Critical reception ==
Professional ratings
Aggregate scores
Source	Rating
AnyDecentMusic?	7.4/10
Metacritic	78/100
Review scores
Source	Rating
AllMusic	4/5 stars
The A.V. Club	B
Exclaim!	8/10
Financial Times	4/5 stars
The Guardian	4/5 stars
The Independent	5/5 stars
Mojo	3/5 stars
The Observer	3/5 stars
Pitchfork	7.9/10
Uncut	6/10

Ken holds a 78 out of 100 on Metacritic, indicating generally favorable reviews. In her review for Pitchfork, Amanda Petrusich called the album "Lynchian" and compared Bejar's lyrics to Leonard Cohen on the track "Sky's Grey". Kayleigh Hughes of Consequence of Sound characterized ken as Destroyer's most accessible album. In her review Hughes named the track "A Light Travels Down the Catwalk" as the album's highlight, likening it to the film The Neon Demon. Hughes was more critical of the album's second half calling it a "letdown," singling out the tracks "Rome" and "La Regle Du Jeu" as "meandering." Winston Cook-Wilson of Spin critiqued aspects of the album's instrumentals calling them a "plasticine" background "for some of the strongest, or at least stickiest, lyrics Bejar’s ever written." Andy Gill of The Independent was more positive, awarding the album a perfect five stars and calling it "possibly [the] best" collection of Destroyer songs.

=== Accolades ===
The album was shortlisted for the Juno Award for Alternative Album of the Year at the Juno Awards of 2019.

Publication	Accolade	Year	Rank	Ref.
Drowned in Sound	Favourite Albums of 2017	2017	78	

== Track listing ==
No.	Title	Length
1.	"Sky's Grey"	4:05
2.	"In the Morning"	3:16
3.	"Tinseltown Swimming in Blood"	4:46
4.	"Cover from the Sun"	2:13
5.	"Saw You at the Hospital"	3:30
6.	"A Light Travels Down the Catwalk"	3:07
7.	"Rome"	5:01
8.	"Sometimes in the World"	2:34
9.	"Ivory Coast"	4:48
10.	"Stay Lost"	2:21
11.	"La Regle du Jeu"	4:01
Total length:		39:42

== Personnel ==
- Daniel Bejar – bass, electric guitar, acoustic guitar, synthesizer, vocals
- Zach Blackstone – assistant engineer
- Ted Bois – piano
- Nicolas Bragg – electric guitar
- David Carswell – acoustic guitar, electric guitar
- JP Carter – effects, trumpet
- John Collins – bass
- Robin Mitchell – design
- Joseph Shabason – effects, saxophone
- Jason Ward - mastering
- Josh Wells – bass, drum programming, drums, electric guitar, percussion, piano, piano strings, synthesizer, mixing, engineer

== Charts ==
Chart	Peak position
US Independent Albums (Billboard)	17
