= Colours of Air =

Studio album by Loscil and Lawrence English
- Released: February 3, 2023
- Genre: Ambient; electronic
- Length: 49:24
- Label: Kranky
- Producer: Scott Morgan; Lawrence English

Loscil and Lawrence English chronology
Colours of Air (2023)	Chroma (2024)

Colours of Air is a collaborative studio album by Canadian musician Scott Morgan under the pseudonym Loscil and Australian musician Lawrence English. It was released on February 3, 2023, through Kranky. It received universal acclaim from critics.

== Background ==
Scott Morgan, also known as Loscil, is a Canadian musician from Vancouver. Lawrence English is an Australian musician from Brisbane. Colours of Air is their first collaborative studio album. It was created using source material from a 19th century pipe organ housed within the Old Museum in Brisbane. The album consists of eight tracks. Each track is named for the color it evokes. A music video was released for the track "Violet". The album was released on February 3, 2023, through Kranky.

Loscil and Lawrence English later released a follow-up record, Chroma (2024).

== Critical reception ==
Professional ratings
Aggregate scores
Source	Rating
Metacritic	84/100
Review scores
Source	Rating
AllMusic	4.5/5 stars
Mojo	4/5 stars
Pitchfork	7.3/10
Spectrum Culture	75%
Uncut	8/10

According to the review aggregator Metacritic, Colours of Air received "universal acclaim" based on a weighted average score of 84 out of 100 from 6 critic scores.

Ted Davis of Pitchfork commented that "Morgan's naturalistic nuance coaxes out English's elusive ethereal side, often glimpsed in passing but rarely explored at length." He added, "Across 49 minutes of muted soundscapes peppered with warm energy, the two musicians use manipulated organ tones to patient, meditative ends." Wyndham Wallace of Uncut wrote, "It was only a matter of time before two of contemporary ambient music's leading practitioners banded together, but these eight tracks, unlike their titles, are subtle, complex, and not always pacifying." Heather Phares of AllMusic stated, "A meeting of the minds that will satisfy and excite fans of either or both artists, Colours of Air is a testament to Morgan and English's artistry that grows richer with each listen."

=== Accolades ===
Year-end lists for Colours of Air
Publication	List	Rank	Ref.
AllMusic	AllMusic Best of 2023	—	

== Track listing ==
Colours of Air track listing
No.	Title	Length
1.	"Cyan"	6:13
2.	"Aqua"	4:27
3.	"Yellow"	5:08
4.	"Grey"	4:09
5.	"Black"	8:42
6.	"Pink"	6:16
7.	"Violet"	6:12
8.	"Magenta"	8:20
Total length:		49:24

== Personnel ==
Credits adapted from liner notes.

- Scott Morgan – production
- Lawrence English – production, organ
