= Poison Season =

Studio album by Destroyer
- Released: August 28, 2015
- Genres: Traditional pop; baroque pop; jazz rock; soft rock
- Length: 52:11
- Labels: Merge; Dead Oceans
- Producers: Dan Bejar; David Carswell

Destroyer chronology
Five Spanish Songs (EP) (2013)	Poison Season (2015)	ken (2017)

Singles from Poison Season
- 1. "Dream Lover" Released: May 21, 2015; 2. "Girl in a Sling" Released: July 8, 2015; 3. "Times Square" Released: August 12, 2015

Poison Season is the tenth studio album by Canadian indie rock band Destroyer, released on August 28, 2015, by Merge Records and Dead Oceans Records.

== Release ==
The first song released from Poison Season, "Dream Lover", was posted on SoundCloud on May 21, 2015. The album's release date, track list, and artwork were announced the same day.

A second song from Poison Season, "Girl in a Sling", was released online on July 8, 2015. On the same day, the music video for "Girl in a Sling", directed by David Galloway, was released. The video cuts back and forth between shots of Bejar, who's working in a darkroom and singing in the shadows, and residential areas in decay. Director David Galloway explained in a press release that the video's tragic tone is meant to fit the album's overall vibe:

Bejar sings a lot about cities and girls and injury, sometimes all at the same time. Sometimes they are the same thing, as surreal novelists would have us believe. Besides, people like to see Dan sing—which he doesn't do a lot of in this video, but he does do a little bit. We wanted to make a video that dealt with central Destroyer themes: to some, Destroyer is a lech; to some, he is an arsonist; to some, he is a savior. To me, he is the consummate comedian, but he resists that role. So we decided to go the opposite way and make something sad, something tragic, something that fits the new record. The adage “comedy equals tragedy plus time” is attributed to Carol Burnett's mum. Or it might have been Steve Allen. Either way, I always want Dan to do physical comedy, but he resists. He's a natural, though. He's the Pacific Northwest's Buster Keaton, and I hope one day to share that with the world. One day. For now, though, there's just this sadness. This poison season.

— David Galloway, Pitchfork

A third song from Poison Season, "Times Square", was released on August 12, 2015, on SoundCloud. On August 27, 2015, a day before Poison Season's release, a stop motion music video for "Times Square", directed by Shayne Ehman, was released. The music video features Dan Bejar singing to the camera as a number of anthropomorphized forest friends rendered with stop-motion animation sing and dance along. The director, Shayne Ehman, described the process of making the video:

We ended up just wandering around New York til 3am and the city seemed completely dead. We could have been anywhere, really. I needed to get outside and shoot in natural light in order to serve as a sort of conduit for those 'forces of nature in love...' which seem to rule the song. I let the sun do its thing and let the earth do it's [sic] thing and watched time unfold. I watched the clouds unfold and unpack and packup. I was at their mercy, completely.

— Shayne Ehman, Pitchfork.

== Critical reception ==
Professional ratings
Aggregate scores
Source	Rating
AnyDecentMusic?	7.7/10
Metacritic	86/100
Review scores
Source	Rating
AllMusic	4.5/5 stars
The A.V. Club	A−
Entertainment Weekly	A−
The Guardian	4/5 stars
Mojo	4/5 stars
NME	8/10
Pitchfork	7.6/10
Q	4/5 stars
Rolling Stone	3.5/4 stars
Spin	8/10

Poison Season received widespread critical acclaim from music critics upon its release. At Metacritic, which assigns a normalized rating out of 100 to reviews from mainstream critics, the album received an average score of 86, based on 26 reviews, indicating "universal acclaim".

Jayson Greene of Pitchfork gave the album a favorable review stating, "Poison Season retains the sumptuous melancholy of Kaputt, leavening it with the elegant swoon of Nelson Riddle-era Frank Sinatra. There are string arrangements all over Poison Season, and they are gorgeously recorded: the orchestra on "Girl in a Sling" sounds like 180-gram vinyl even while in earbuds. Destroyer has always partly been a nostalgia project, even when Bejar's nostalgia was decidedly ersatz—his records aim to stir the feelings that classic recordings arouse in us. Streethawk hearkened back to glam-rock Bowie even if the resemblance was off, and the magic of Kaputt was partly that of a peculiar and gnomic figure like Bejar conjuring the jaded romanticism of Bryan Ferry. On Poison Season, he visits a different section of his record collection, one that predates rock'n'roll, and he applies all the studied love and imagination to the endeavor we've come to expect from him."

=== Accolades ===
Publication	Accolade	Year	Rank
Pitchfork	The 50 Best Albums of 2015	2015	43
Uncut	The Top 75 Albums of the Year	2015	36

== Track listing ==
No.	Title	Length
1.	"Times Square, Poison Season I"	2:33
2.	"Dream Lover"	3:48
3.	"Forces From Above"	5:51
4.	"Hell"	3:17
5.	"The River"	3:35
6.	"Girl in a Sling"	3:04
7.	"Times Square"	4:11
8.	"Archer on the Beach"	4:56
9.	"Midnight Meet the Rain"	3:24
10.	"Solace's Bride"	3:43
11.	"Bangkok"	5:14
12.	"Sun in the Sky"	5:33
13.	"Times Square, Poison Season II"	3:02
Total length:		52:11

== Personnel ==
- Daniel Bejar – MIDI, mixing, producer, vocals
- John Collins – bass
- Ted Bois – piano, Roland D50
- Nicolas Bragg – electric guitar
- Fabiola Carranza – cover photo
- David Carswell – acoustic guitar, electric guitar, MIDI, mixing, producer
- JP Carter – effects, trumpet
- Maggie Fost – design
- Dave Graham – engineer
- Henry Lee – viola
- Peggy Leo – cello
- Jeff Lipton – mastering
- Tyson Naylor – DX-7, piano
- Erik Nielsen – assistant engineer
- Dylan Palmer – contrabass
- John Raham – editing, engineer, string mixing
- Maria Rice – mastering engineer
- Joseph Shabason – flute, saxophone
- Stefan Udell – string arrangements
- Josh Wells – bongos, congas, drums, percussion
- Rebecca Whitling – violin
- Jesse Zubot – arranger, editing, string mixing, viola, violin

== Charts ==
Chart (2015)	Peak position
Belgian Albums (Ultratop Flanders)	52
Dutch Albums (Album Top 100)	31
German Albums (Offizielle Top 100)	54
Scottish Albums (Official Charts)	53
Swiss Albums (Schweizer Hitparade)	94
UK Albums (Official Charts)	90
UK Independent Albums (Official Charts)	6
US Billboard 200	118
US Top Alternative Albums (Billboard)	13
US Independent Albums (Billboard)	9
US Top Rock Albums (Billboard)	19
US Vinyl Albums (Billboard)	4
