= Your Blues =

Studio album by Destroyer
- Released: March 8, 2004
- Recorded: late summer/early fall 2003
- Studio: JC/DC
- Genres: Art pop, indie pop
- Length: 46:11
- Labels: Merge; Trifekta; Scratch; Talitres; Acuarela Discos
- Producers: John Collins; David Carswell; Dan Bejar

Destroyer chronology
| This Night (2002) | Your Blues (2004) | Notorious Lightning & Other Works (EP) (2005) |

Your Blues is the sixth studio album by Destroyer, released on March 8, 2004 by Merge Records, Trifekta Records, Scratch Records, Talitres Records, and Acuarela Discos.

It is a notable departure from the full-band format of Destroyer's previous few albums, largely featuring MIDI-simulated orchestration as its backing music.

The album was reissued in 2014 by Merge Records.

== Critical reception ==
Professional ratings
Aggregate scores
| Source | Rating |
|---|---|
| Metacritic | 79/100 |
Review scores
| Source | Rating |
| AllMusic | 4/5 stars |
| The A.V. Club | C+ |
| Pitchfork | 8.6/10 |
| PopMatters | 8/10 stars |
| Spin | B+ |
| Uncut | 3/5 stars |

Your Blues received positive reviews from contemporary music critics. At Metacritic, which assigns a normalized rating out of 100 to reviews from mainstream critics, the album received an average score of 79, based on 14 reviews, which indicates "generally favorable reviews".

Matt LeMay of Pitchfork gave the album a very favorable review stating, "Like Bejar's 2002 release This Night, Your Blues constitutes a fundamental challenge to deeply ingrained conventions of sincerity and emotional honesty. The record's conceptual brilliance lies largely in Bejar's ability to craft deeply moving passages out of ostensibly artificial and contrived elements, subtly suggesting that all music, if not all human expression, is in effect some sort of artifice. Bejar's critical engagement with codified aesthetic techniques certainly renders Your Blues a less immediately "accessible" record, and can at first come off as kitschy or detached. But the album's unique and defiant expression makes this the most holistically accomplished album Bejar has released to date."

== Track listing ==
All tracks are written by Dan Bejar.

| No. | Title | Length |
|---|---|---|
| 1. | "Notorious Lightning" | 5:57 |
| 2. | "It's Gonna Take an Airplane" | 3:41 |
| 3. | "An Actor's Revenge" | 2:57 |
| 4. | "The Music Lovers" | 4:22 |
| 5. | "From Oakland to Warsaw" | 3:11 |
| 6. | "Your Blues" | 2:57 |
| 7. | "New Ways of Living" | 4:23 |
| 8. | "Don't Become the Thing You Hated" | 2:13 |
| 9. | "Mad Foxes" | 4:45 |
| 10. | "The Fox and the Hound" | 3:23 |
| 11. | "What Road" | 3:57 |
| 12. | "Certain Things You Ought to Know" | 4:25 |
| Total length: | | 46:11 |

== Personnel ==
=== Destroyer ===
- Dan Bejar - vocals, acoustic guitar, Roland XV-3080, Kurzweil K2600, percussion, production
- John Collins - Roland XV-3080, Kurzweil K2600, production, recording
- David Carswell - Roland XV-3080, Kurzweil K2600, production, recording

=== Additional personnel ===
- Jamie Sitar - mastering at Suite Sound Labs, Vancouver
- Sydney Vermont - drawing
- Marya Spenton - layout
