= We'll Build Them a Golden Bridge =

Studio album by Destroyer
- Released: July 16, 1996; October 24, 2006 (Reissue)
- Recorded: February and June 1995
- Genre: Indie rock
- Length: 35:55
- Label: Tinker, Scratch Records

Destroyer chronology
We'll Build Them a Golden Bridge (1996)	Ideas for Songs (1997)

Alternative Cover
- 2006 Reissue cover

Professional ratings
Review scores
Source	Rating
Pitchfork	(6.5/10)

We'll Build Them a Golden Bridge is the debut album by Destroyer. Originally released on Tinker Recordings in 1996, it was reissued by Scratch Records on October 24, 2006.

The album's title is an allusion to Leo Tolstoy's novel War and Peace, in which Mikhail Kutuzov, the commander of the Russian army, promises to build Napoleon and the French army a "golden bridge" out of Russia - that is, to allow the French to continue on their hasty retreat without attempting to do battle, which would only bring about needless destruction and loss of life.

== Track listing ==
All tracks are written by Dan Bejar

No.	Title	Length
1.	"Revolution"	1:15
2.	"J. Tailor"	2:44
3.	"Smith"	1:11
4.	"I, as McCarthy"	2:01
5.	"Mending Song"	1:08
6.	"Leave Little Fiddler (Alone)"	4:06
7.	"The Pornographers"	0:57
8.	"War on Jazz"	3:00
9.	"Islands in the Stream"	1:31
10.	"Saddestroyer"	3:14
11.	"Streets of Fire"	1:50
12.	"Rose Fleched This"	3:27
13.	"Breakin' the Law"	2:38
14.	"Whistilin' Dixie (She Shoots)"	3:08
15.	"Riots"	1:33
16.	"Knowing When to Leave (Slang Mix)"	2:12
Total length:		35:55

== Personnel ==
- Dan Bejar - vocals, acoustic guitar
