= Destroyer (band) =

Canadian indie rock band

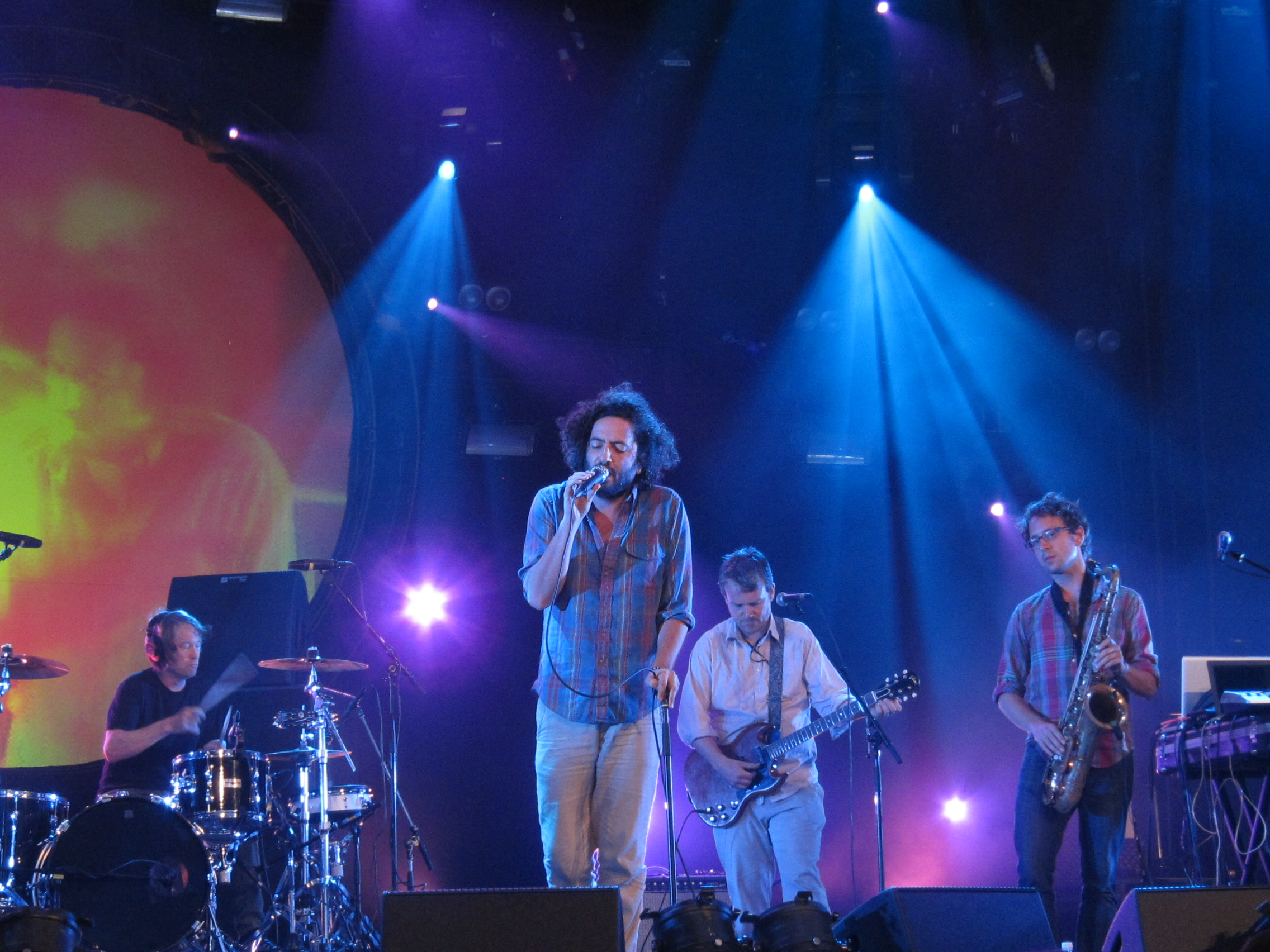
- Destroyer performing at Flow Festival 2011

Background information
- Origin: Vancouver, British Columbia, Canada
- Genre: Indie rock
- Years active: 1995–present
- Labels: Tinker; Granted Passage Cassettes; Merge; Talitres
- Members: Dan Bejar; John Collins; David Carswell; Ted Bois; Nicolas Bragg; JP Carter; Joshua Wells
- Past members: Joseph Shabason; Scott Morgan; Stephen Wood; Jason Zumpano; Chris Frey; Fisher Rose; Tim Loewen; Pete Bourne

Destroyer is a Canadian indie rock band formed in 1995 in Vancouver, British Columbia. The band is fronted by founding member and lead vocalist Dan Bejar, with a collective of regular band members and collaborators joining him in the studio and during live performances. Alongside Bejar, Destroyer currently includes longtime producers John Collins (bass) and David Carswell (guitar), Nicolas Bragg (lead guitar), Ted Bois (keyboards), JP Carter (trumpet) and Joshua Wells (drums).

The band's discography draws on a variety of musical influences, resulting in albums that can sound markedly distinct from one another; in Bejar's words, "That's kind of my goal: to start from scratch every time". Destroyer has released fourteen studio albums to date, with their most recent, Dan's Boogie, released in March 2025.

== Career ==
=== 1996–2001: We'll Build Them a Golden Bridge, City of Daughters, Thief, Streethawk: A Seduction ===
Destroyer's 1996 debut, We'll Build Them a Golden Bridge, is made up of sixteen lo-fi home-recordings. The album's follow-up Ideas for Songs, released on cassette in 1997, features songs akin to those on Golden Bridge; the cassette stemmed from a request to contribute songs for a compilation album.

As Bejar gained popularity in Vancouver's music scene, he was joined by producer John Collins for 1998's City of Daughters, which was the band's first album recorded in a proper studio. Paul Thompson of Pitchfork noted that the songs still sounded "homespun", also noting "[t]he wordiness that would become something of a trademark is in full effect", but that "unlike much of what came later, not every line is worthy of examination".

Thief (2000) embodied "Bejar's first stab at matching his grandiose, idiosyncratic vision to a showier sound"; it was Destroyer's first album to feature a backing band on every track. The record's "anthemic yet understated" piano-driven ballads retain the band's characteristically enigmatic lyrics, though some reviewers interpreted them as critiques of the music industry.

Streethawk: A Seduction (2001) continued the band's refinement that began with City of Daughters. Bejar, in an interview with Matt LeMay, said: "I don't think it gives credence to any kind of conceptualization of the records, but I hope that City of Daughters, Thief, and Streethawk will pop into some kind of a progression that ends with Streethawk". A critical success at release, the album also retrospectively received a rating of 9.1/10 from Pitchfork.

=== 2002–2007: This Night, Your Blues, Destroyer's Rubies ===
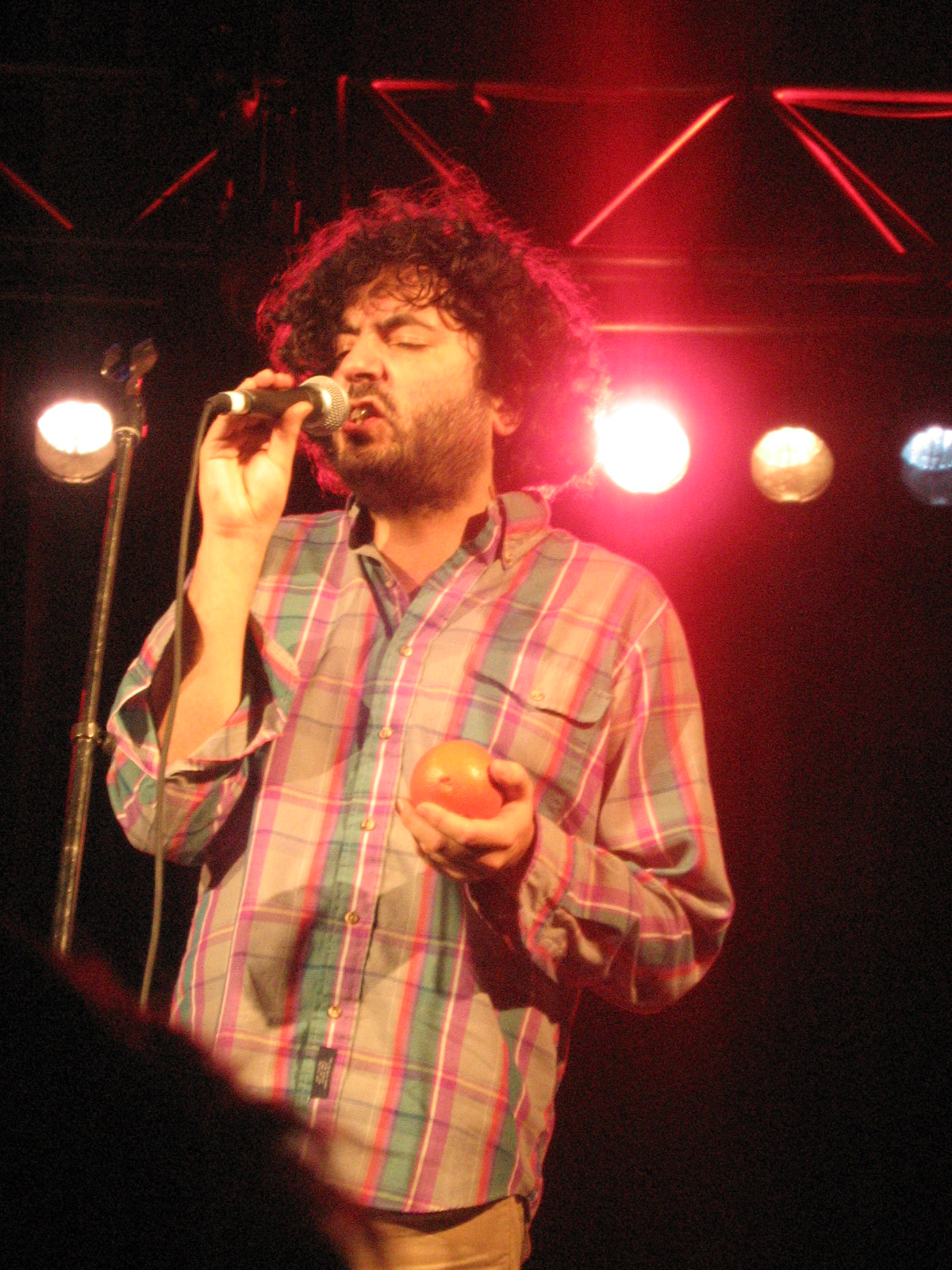
Frontman Dan Bejar, 2007.

Destroyer's next album, This Night (2002), was another dramatic change in style for the band; the looser, less rehearsed style was criticized as "messy [and] haphazard without purpose", though other critics praised the "beautiful mess of sounds" as "challenging... [and] a powerful, cohesive whole". In a 2006 interview (after the release of Your Blues and Destroyer's Rubies), Bejar said the album "came together pretty quickly – we probably could have used more than four or five days to mix the whole thing, but that's all hindsight. It's still my favorite Destroyer record".

Your Blues (2004) saw another stylistic shift, using MIDI instrumentation for almost all of the backing music; Bejar coined the term "European blues" to describe its unique, theatrical sound. One reviewer for Stylus Magazine pointed out that "Bejar's unusual voice sounds more confident, and higher up" in the synth-rich arrangements. The EP Notorious Lightning & Other Works reworked six tracks from Your Blues with live instrumentation, made by Bejar in collaboration with fellow Canadian indie band Frog Eyes.

Bejar returned with a live band for 2006's Destroyer's Rubies. The backing band took new-found prominence and, according to Bejar, "[t]he production seems... warm and lush and pretty focused on just making the band sound good and having everything sit well together". Now Magazine observed that "[w]hile the sheer density of Bejar's writing can be overwhelming, Destroyer's Rubies is, on a musical level, the most 'accessible' disc he's released".

=== 2008–2013: Trouble in Dreams, Kaputt ===
For Trouble in Dreams (2008), Bejar admitted that "there was a scary lack of ideas coming into the record". As an alternative to keyboard and piano accompaniment, the band's pianist Ted Bois took it upon himself to create string and synth arrangements for the songs. At the time, Bejar said it had been the "hardest record" for the band to make.

Following the 2009 EP Bay of Pigs came the band's next full-length album, Kaputt (2011). Bejar cited influences such as Miles Davis and Roxy Music for the album's jazz-informed sophisti-pop direction. In multiple interviews, Bejar stressed that he "sang in a completely different manner, almost unconscious of even singing, more like speaking into a vacuum, and was really happy with the results". The record entailed a number of firsts for Destroyer: first national television performance (on Late Night with Jimmy Fallon); first official music video; first female backing vocals; and the first time Bejar performed without an instrument on tour, with his concentration moving solely to his vocals. Kaputt was shortlisted for the 2011 Polaris Music Prize and was Pitchfork's second best album of 2011.

Smaller in scale, Destroyer's fourth EP Five Spanish Songs is sung entirely in Spanish, Bejar covered songs by Sr. Chinarro (es). Bejar's own tongue-in-cheek press release announcing the new songs began: "It was 2013. The English language seemed spent, despicable, not easily singable".

=== 2014–2019: Poison Season, ken ===
Bejar released Poison Season on August 28, 2015. Bejar notes that the album's sound grew from "just really getting into what we were sounding like playing live [following Kaputt]". He added that he would not have been able to make such an ambitious album if Kaputt had not been successful. Recorded with a live band and a pronounced string section, the album's "grand cinematic set of songs" feature Bejar singing with a broader range than before: "This is the first record that I've ever done that comes close to my idea of myself as a singer", Bejar said.

In 2017, Bejar released ken, an album produced by Destroyer drummer Joshua Wells (who was also a member of Black Mountain).

=== 2020–present: Have We Met, Labyrinthitis, and Dan's Boogie ===
Destroyer's twelfth studio album, Have We Met, was released on January 31, 2020.

On March 25, 2022, the band's thirteenth studio album, Labyrinthitis, was released. It was shortlisted for the 2023 Polaris Music Prize.

On March 28, 2025, the band released their fourteenth album, Dan's Boogie. It was critically acclaimed, with Pitchfork giving the album an 8/10 and the album being longlisted for the 2025 Polaris Music Prize.

== Band name ==
In 2002, Bejar said about the band name, "I kind of wanted to go for a rock 'n' roll name. In our own special way we're tearing shit apart, you just have to listen very carefully. Musically I knew it was never going to be a metal band, but I thought lyrically there were fangs to the music". Bejar added in 2008, "I was actually so out of it I didn't know that there was a Kiss record called Destroyer because I didn't know anything about Kiss. I still don't know anything about them. I just thought it was a cool rock-and-roll name, and I was kind of blown away that it hadn't been taken already. I was like, 'I have to use this because it's so weird that no one's used it before.'"

== Collaborators ==
The band's lineup has constantly rotated since its inception, and can give the impression that Destroyer is a solo project. However, Bejar has insisted that "[t]he music is always collaborative and I think that gets lost in the weird cult of personality shit that seems to get whipped up around me". Although Bejar had claimed that the lineup from certain recording sessions would be permanent, later recording sessions and tours added and dropped musicians at different intervals.. Several band members have the commonality of being from the production team of JC/DC (John Collins and David Carswell).

Some songs recorded for Your Blues originated from Bejar's musical contribution to Sheila Heti's play All Our Happy Days Are Stupid.

On the EP Archer on the Beach (2010), Bejar worked with ambient-music composer Tim Hecker for the title track. Bejar wrote in the press release: "The reason why this has to be seen as a collaboration, rather than strictly a Destroyer release, is that, for the first time, I'm not responsible for any of the music ... aside from the vocals, the general chord progression". On the B-side, the spoken word song "Grief Point", Scott Morgan, a former member of the band, provided the music under his ambient alias Loscil. Morgan also composed an extra track, "Loscil's Rubies", for the vinyl version of Destroyer's Rubies.

American visual artist Kara Walker contributed to the lyrics for Kaputt's "Suicide Demo (For Kara Walker)". Organized by Merge, Walker sent cue cards with bits of text to Bejar in 2009.

Bejar's wife, Vancouver artist and Hello, Blue Roses partner Sydney Hermant, has provided the cover art for multiple Destroyer albums, including We'll Build Them a Golden Bridge, This Night, Your Blues, Trouble in Dreams and Labyrinthitis.

== Members ==
Current members

- Dan Bejar – lead vocals, guitar, synthesisers (1995–present)
- John Collins – bass guitar, synthesisers, programming, production (1998–2001, 2003–present)
- Nicolas Bragg – lead guitar (2002, 2005–present)
- Ted Bois – keyboards (2005–present)
- David Carswell – guitar, keyboards, backing vocals, production (2009–present)
- JP Carter – trumpet (2010–present)
- Joshua Wells – drums, percussion, backing vocals, keyboards (2012–present)

Former members

- Scott Morgan – drums, saxophone, clarinet, classical guitar (1998–2002, 2005–2007)
- Jason Zumpano – keyboards (1999–2002)
- Stephen Wood – guitar 1999–2002
- Chris Frey – bass guitar (2002)
- Fisher Rose – drums, vibraphone, trumpet (2002, 2005–2008)
- Tim Loewen – bass guitar (2005–2008)
- Pete Bourne – drums (2008–2011)
- Joseph Shabason – saxophone, flutes (2010–2017)

Former touring members

- Colin Cowan – bass guitar (2017–2023)
- Carey Mercer – backing vocals, guitar, organ (2004)
- Melanie Campbell – drums (2004)
- Michael Rak – bass guitar (2004)
- Grayson Walker – keyboards (2004)

== Discography ==
Studio albums

- We'll Build Them a Golden Bridge (1996)
- City of Daughters (1998)
- Thief (2000)
- Streethawk: A Seduction (2001)
- This Night (2002)
- Your Blues (2004)
- Destroyer's Rubies (2006)
- Trouble in Dreams (2008)
- Kaputt (2011)
- Poison Season (2015)
- ken (2017)
- Have We Met (2020)
- Labyrinthitis (2022)
- Dan's Boogie (2025)

EPs

- Notorious Lightning & Other Works (2005)
- Bay of Pigs (2009)
- Archer on the Beach (2010)
- Five Spanish Songs (2013)

Music videos

Song	Album
"Kaputt"	Kaputt
"Savage Night at the Opera"	Kaputt
"Times Square"	Poison Season
"Girl in a Sling"	Poison Season
"Stay Lost"	ken
"Tinseltown Swimming in Blood"	ken
"Crimson Tide"	Have We Met
"It Just Doesn't Happen"	Have We Met
"Cue Synthesizer"	Have We Met
"Tintoretto, It's for You"	Labyrinthitis
"June"	Labyrinthitis
