= Lake Fire (album) =

Studio album by Loscil
- Released: May 2, 2025
- Length: 55:36
- Label: Kranky

Loscil chronology
Umbel (2024)	Lake Fire (2025)

Lake Fire is a studio album by Canadian musician Loscil. It was released on May 2, 2025, by Kranky Records. Preceded by Loscil's 2024 record, Umbel, it features nine songs with a total runtime of approximately fifty-five minutes.

== Reception ==
Professional ratings
Aggregate scores
Source	Rating
Metacritic	81/100
Review scores
Source	Rating
AllMusic	4/5 stars
Pitchfork	6.9/10
Uncut	8/10

According to the review aggregator Metacritic, Lake Fire received "universal acclaim" based on a weighted average score of 81 out of 100 from 5 critic scores.

Heather Phares of AllMusic noted in her review of the album, "Finely nuanced shades of gray are all he needs on Lake Fire, a formidable, beautiful return to Loscil's fundamentals." Pitchfork rated the album 6.9 out of ten and stated the album “continues the thread of apprehension that's long been present in Loscil's music, which is often about human encroachment on the natural world." Wyndham Wallace of Uncut gave the album a rating of eight out of ten, stating "Like the monolithic squall of noise dominating its often stern title track, Lake Fire emerges from something else entirely: a suite for electronic and live musicians that never came to pass."

== Track listing ==
All tracks are written by Scott Morgan.

Lake Fire track listing
No.	Title	Length
1.	"Arrhythmia"	5:17
2.	"Bell Flame"	6:06
3.	"Candling"	5:23
4.	"Silos"	6:46
5.	"Spark"	6:23
6.	"Ash Clouds"	6:43
7.	"Flutter"	5:51
8.	"Doux"	5:47
9.	"Lake Fire"	7:20
Total length:		55:36

== Personnel ==
Credits adapted from liner notes.

- Scott Morgan – production
- James Meager – double bass (6)
- Lawrence English – mastering
- Craig McCaffrey – design
