= Dan Bejar =

Canadian musician

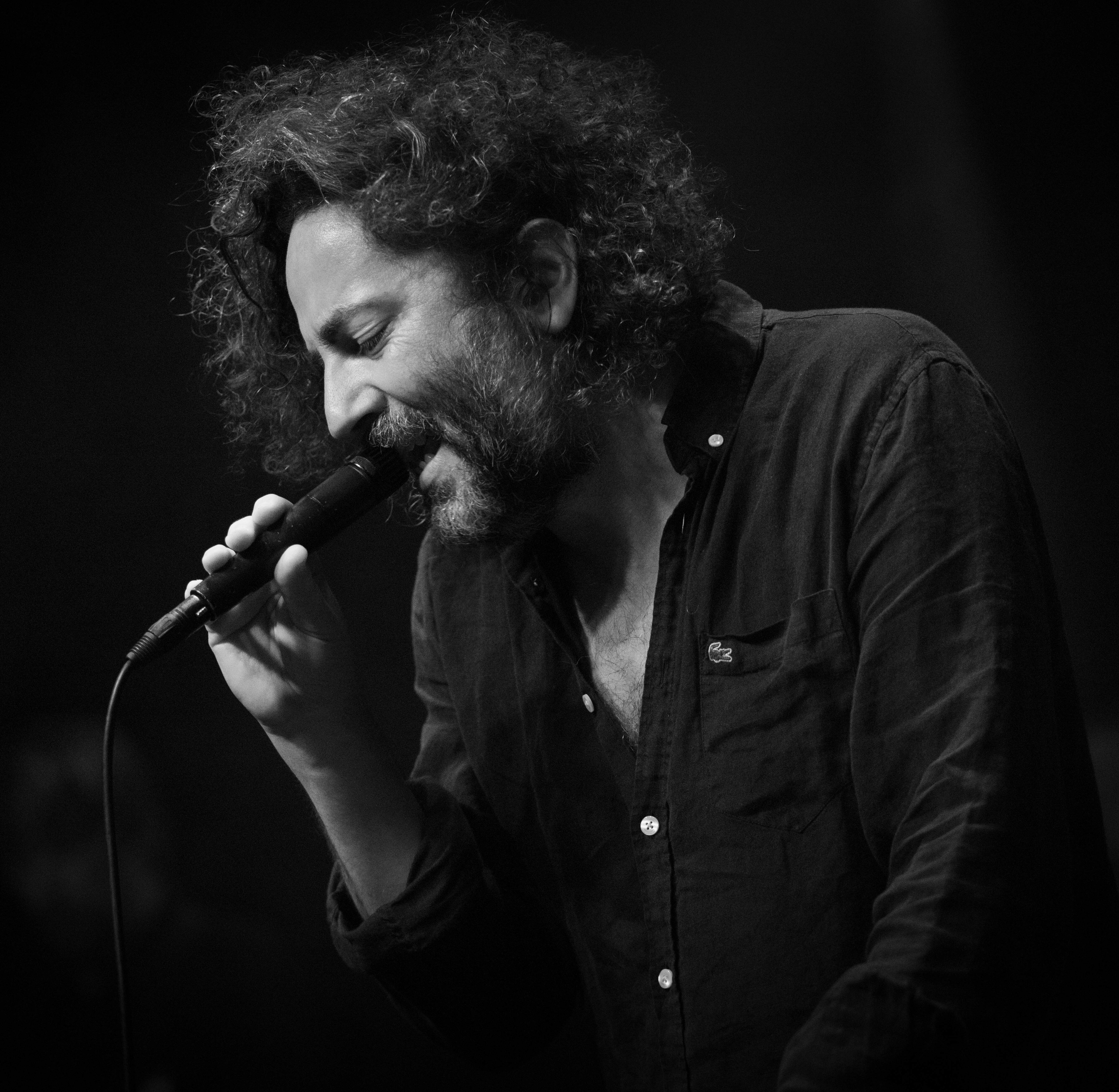
- Bejar in 2022

Background information
- Born: October 4, 1972 (age 53); Vancouver, British Columbia, Canada
- Genres: Chamber pop, indie pop, folk, indie rock
- Occupation: Musician
- Instruments: Vocals, guitar, piano, tambourine
- Years active: Mid-1990s–present
- Labels: Tinker, Granted Passage Cassettes, Merge, Endearing, Jagjaguwar, Locust Records, Rough Trade, Misra

Daniel Bejar (/ˈbeɪhɑːr/ BAY-har; born October 4, 1972) is a Canadian singer and musician from Vancouver, British Columbia. He is the frontman of Destroyer, and was a member of indie rock band the New Pornographers.

== Overview ==
In 2006, Bejar joined Carey Mercer of Frog Eyes and Spencer Krug of Sunset Rubdown and Wolf Parade as part of indie supergroup Swan Lake. He has also collaborated with his wife, Sydney Hermant, as the duo Hello, Blue Roses, whose debut album was released in 2008.

== Personal life ==
Bejar was born in 1972 to a Spanish father and an American mother at Vancouver General Hospital. Bejar's father was a physicist who grew up Catholic in Spain during the Francoist dictatorship, and his mother was a Jewish teacher who taught the Spanish language. Bejar was raised without religion. His father died when he was 13 years old. Growing up, Bejar moved frequently; in adulthood, he has resided in Southern California, Canada and Spain. Bejar attended University of British Columbia for three years: "To my credit, I eventually dropped out; to my discredit, I waited three years to do it. I was taking mostly English and philosophy classes, fooling myself into thinking I might be an academic."

Bejar has a daughter and lives in Vancouver's Strathcona neighbourhood.

In the late 1990s, Bejar had an acting role in his future New Pornographers bandmate Blaine Thurier's microbudget film Low Self-Esteem Girl.

Bejar has occasionally been mistaken for American visual artist Daniel Bejar. In March 2010, an article in The New Yorker detailed the visual artist Bejar's project "The Googlegänger", which detailed his efforts to impersonate the singer of the same name, and the past confusion by the media between the two.

== Discography ==
Year	Title	Band	Label
1996	We'll Build Them a Golden Bridge	Destroyer	Tinker Records
1997	Ideas for Songs	Destroyer	Granted Passage Cassettes
1998	City of Daughters	Destroyer	Endearing/Triple Crown Audio
1999	Offshore	Points Gray	Tedium House
2000	Vancouver Nights	Vancouver Nights	Endearing
2000	Mass Romantic	The New Pornographers	Mint (CA)/Matador (US, EU)
2000	Thief	Destroyer	Catsup Plate/Triple Crown Audio/Cave Canem Records
2001	Streethawk: A Seduction	Destroyer	Misra/Talitres Records
2002	This Night	Destroyer	Merge/Talitres Records
2003	Electric Version	The New Pornographers	Mint (CA)/Matador (US, EU)
2004	Your Blues	Destroyer	Merge/Talitres/Acuarela Discos
2005	Notorious Lightning & Other Works (EP)	Destroyer	Merge
2005	Twin Cinema	The New Pornographers	Mint (CA)/Matador (US, EU)
2006	Destroyer's Rubies	Destroyer	Merge
2006	Beast Moans	Swan Lake	Jagjaguwar
2007	Challengers	The New Pornographers	Last Gang Records (CA)/Matador (US, EU)
2007	The Szabo Songbook	Heartbreak Scene	Fayettenam Records
2008	The Portrait Is Finished...	Hello, Blue Roses	Locust Records
2008	Trouble in Dreams	Destroyer	Merge/Rough Trade
2009	Enemy Mine	Swan Lake	Jagjaguwar
2009	Bay of Pigs (EP)	Destroyer	Merge
2010	Endless Falls	loscil	Kranky
2010	Together	The New Pornographers	Matador
2010	Archer on the Beach (EP)	Destroyer	Merge
2011	Kaputt	Destroyer	Merge
2013	Five Spanish Songs (EP)	Destroyer	Merge
2014	Brill Bruisers	The New Pornographers	Matador
2015	WZO	Hello, Blue Roses	Jaz Records
2015	Poison Season	Destroyer	Merge Records/Dead Oceans
2017	ken	Destroyer	Merge Records/Dead Oceans
2020	Have We Met	Destroyer	Merge Records/Dead Oceans
2022	Labyrinthitis	Destroyer	Merge Records/Dead Oceans
2025	Dan's Boogie	Destroyer	Merge Records
