= Monument Builders =

Studio album by Loscil
- Released: November 11, 2016
- Genre: Ambient; electronic
- Length: 37:40
- Label: Kranky
- Producer: Scott Morgan

Loscil chronology
Sea Island (2014)	Monument Builders (2016)	Equivalents (2019)

Monument Builders is a studio album by Canadian composer and record producer Scott Morgan under the pseudonym Loscil. It was released on November 11, 2016, through Kranky. It received generally favorable reviews from critics.

== Background ==
Monument Builders is Loscil's first studio album since Sea Island (2014). He drew inspiration from rewatching a VHS copy of the documentary film Koyaanisqatsi (1982), as well as its score composed by Philip Glass. He was also inspired by the works of photographer Edward Burtynsky and the writings of philosopher John Gray. A music video was released for the track "Drained Lake".

== Critical reception ==
Professional ratings
Aggregate scores
Source	Rating
Metacritic	77/100
Review scores
Source	Rating
AllMusic	4.5/5 stars
Exclaim!	8/10
The Line of Best Fit	8/10
Pitchfork	7.4/10
PopMatters	7/10
The Skinny	4/5 stars

According to the review aggregator Metacritic, Monument Builders received "generally favorable reviews" based on a weighted average score of 77 out of 100 from 11 critic scores.

Heather Phares of AllMusic stated, "Monument Builders is a powerful reminder that ambient music is a fine conduit for emotionally and politically charged messages, and it's one of Morgan's finest works yet." Daniel Sylvester of Exclaim! commented that the album "finds Loscil at his most focused, political and meticulous, a bleak but fulfilling listen whether you're aware of the album's brainy themes or not." Brian Burlage of Pitchfork described it as "a highly visual album, a mosaic of images depicting construction, erasure, devastation, redemption, and transformation."

Finbarr Bermingham of The Skinny stated, "This is a breathless and dense record, built on layers of crackle, fuzz and dystopian fugue." He added, "What really capture the imagination, though, are the fleeting, stark melodies Loscil introduces on almost every track." Ian King of The Line of Best Fit stated, "Leaving listeners in the 'Weeds' surrounded by a swirl of haunting whispers, Monument Builders doesn't offer a happy ending, but nor is it devoid of hope." He added, "Perhaps Loscil's most confrontational record, it processes the darkness in order to expunge it."

=== Accolades ===
Year-end lists for Monument Builders
Publication	List	Rank	Ref.
AllMusic	Favorite Electronic Albums	—	
Somewherecold	Top 10 Albums of the Year	4	

== Track listing ==
All tracks are written by Scott Morgan.

Monument Builders track listing
No.	Title	Length
1.	"Drained Lake"	6:46
2.	"Red Tide"	5:25
3.	"Monument Builders"	4:43
4.	"Straw Dogs"	4:57
5.	"Deceiver"	4:41
6.	"Anthropocene"	4:39
7.	"Weeds"	6:29
Total length:		37:40

== Personnel ==
Credits adapted from liner notes.

- Scott Morgan – production
- Nick Anderson – French horn (2–4, 6)
- Erik Nielsen – French horn recording (2–4, 6)
- Joshua Stevenson – synthesis (2, 6)
- Ashley Pitre – vocal sample (7)
- Rafael Anton – mastering
- Bob Weston – lathe cut
