= First Narrows (album) =

2004 album by Loscil

Studio album by Loscil
- Released: 10 May 2004
- Genre: Ambient; drone; electronic; minimal techno
- Length: 53:37
- Label: Kranky

Loscil chronology
Submers (2002)	First Narrows (2004)	Plume (2006)

First Narrows is a studio album by Canadian ambient producer Scott Morgan, under the alias of Loscil. The album features live performances on guitar, cello and electric piano, and makes minimal use of percussion. It was released on 10 May 2004 through Kranky. Critics reviewed the album positively, commending the album's atmospherics and use of live instrumentation.

== Background ==
Morgan began writing songs at 13, before going on to learn about electroacoustic and "computer" music at university. Morgan was eventually picked up by Kranky, going on to release his first album, Triple Point. He would follow up with Submers in 2002, which was described as an "aquatic" album. The title "First Narrows" refers to the official name for the Lions Gate Bridge, which crosses over the Burrard Inlet. While originally released in 2004, the album was released on vinyl on 17 February 2017.

== Music ==
First Narrows has been described as ambient, drone, electronic, and minimal techno. The album makes little use of percussive elements throughout. Morgan incorporated live instrumentation within the album; guitar was performed by Tim Loewen, electric piano was performed by Jason Zumpano and cello was performed by Nyla Rany. Morgan wanted to use his local area as subject matter for the album, noting the first two Loscil albums were "very outside myself, almost objective". Morgan designed "flawed" generative patches in order to make sure no two performances were the same. Two of the tracks were named after Morgan's cats.

The opening tracks see "drum machines shuffle away gently under gauzy drones and synth pulses". Opener "Sickbay" has similarities to "Mute" from Submers. One critic said the track "begins mid-stream as if we have just plunged into the current and are swiftly carried along". "Lucy Dub" is made up of "oceanic waves of ambient drones" and the crackles of vinyl records. The title track sees "distant tones moan on" with "reverberating sonar blips" and subtle guitar loops. One critic noted that the "interplay between the guitar and piano" creates a hopeful melody. "Emma" has a "almost dubby, trance-like vibe" and is accompanied by soft electric guitar. "Brittles" makes use of a "simple and sonorous Rhodes line". Closer "Cloister" makes significant use of live instrumentation; one critic called it "Loscil's most ambitious composition to date".

== Critical reception ==
Professional ratings
Review scores
Source	Rating
AllMusic	4/5 stars
Pitchfork	7.6/10
Tiny Mix Tapes	4/5
The Winnipeg Sun	3/5 stars

First Narrows was received positively by critics. Reviewing the album for AllMusic, Thom Jurek called the album "a glorious experiment in aural atmospherics". In a piece for BBC Music, Peter Marsh called the album a "mix of beauty and vague threat" and a "subtly beautiful listen". Darren Eke of Exclaim! called the album a "refreshing release for new and old fans alike" and noted its "significantly brighter tone" compared to previous releases. Malcolm Mayhew of the Fort Worth Star-Telegram called the album a "long sweep of dramatic, lush and occasionally tender music". Igloo Magazine described the album as "ambience caught between the sea and the sunrise and makes you feel like you are floating on one and being warmed by the other". Writing for Pitchfork, Chris Ott called the album one that "relies so heavily on creative evolution as a selling point". A piece for Tiny Mix Tapes called the album a "compelling, albeit soporific, masterpiece of ambient electronic drone". Darryl Sterdan of The Winnipeg Sun called the album a "lightly burbling post-rock lullabies and flotation-tank soundtracks".

== Track listing ==
First Narrows track listing
No.	Title	Length
1.	"Sickbay"	6:13
2.	"Lucy Dub"	7:19
3.	"First Narrows"	10:19
4.	"Emma (Note: Spelled as "Ema" on streaming platforms.)"	7:31
5.	"Modo (Note: Spelled as "Mode" on streaming platforms.)"	5:43
6.	"Brittle"	7:33
7.	"Cloister"	8:59
Total length:		53:37

2017 vinyl re-issue
No.	Title	Length
6.	"Saturday"

== Personnel ==
Credits adapted from the liner notes of First Narrows.

- Scott Morgan – production, composition
- Jason Ward – lathe cut
- Rafael Anton Irisarri – remastering
