= Submers =

Studio album by Loscil
- Released: November 4, 2002
- Genre: Ambient techno
- Length: 60:42
- Label: Kranky
- Producer: Scott Morgan

Loscil chronology
Triple Point (2001)	Submers (2002)	First Narrows (2004)

Submers is a studio album by Canadian musician Scott Morgan under the alias of Loscil. It was released in 2002 by Kranky.

== Production and style ==
Large portions of the music on Submers was from classical music that had been sampled and distorted by Morgan. AllMusic described the sound on Submers as not being very different from than Morgan's previous album Triple Point, noting that the "only significant difference is the emphasis on waves of rhythm over thumps and pulses."

Each track on Submers is named after a submarine. These ranged from early submarines such as the Gymnote to the Russian submarine Kursk (K-141).

== Release ==
Submers was released by Kranky via compact disc on November 4, 2002. The album was reissued on vinyl for the first time on November 23, 2018, by Kranky.

== Reception ==
Professional ratings
Review scores
Source	Rating
AllMusic	4.5/5 stars
Exclaim!	8/10
Pitchfork	8.0/10

AllMusic gave the album four and a half stars out of five, stating that the album "tops Morgan's impressive debut and provides further proof that the field of ambient techno continues to have plenty to offer" Pitchfork gave the album an 8.0 rating out of a possible 10, noting that "the delicate touches are what really make it." Exclaim! praised the album for "spellbinding songs and creating a continuously absorbing record" and that "Submers resonates with remarkable elegance from its opening tones to its closing echoes"

Reviewing the reissue in 2018, Rob Nay of Exclaim! noted that "These low end-heavy grooves sound perfectly aquatic on wax; kudos are in order for Kranky, who have polished up an already glistening gem for further appreciation."

== Track listing ==
All songs composed and produced by Scott Morgan.

1. "Argonaut I" – 7:07
2. "Gymnote" – 5:57
3. "Mute" – 7:30
4. "Nautilus" – 6:59
5. "Diable Marin" – 4:13
6. "Resurgam" – 7:35
7. "Le Plongeur" – 7:07
8. "Triton" – 6:43
9. "Kursk" – 7:10

== Credits ==
Credits adapted from the album's sleeve.

- Scott Morgan – composition, production, music
- Emplus Creative Solutions – cover design

== See also ==
- 2002 in music
