= Loscil =

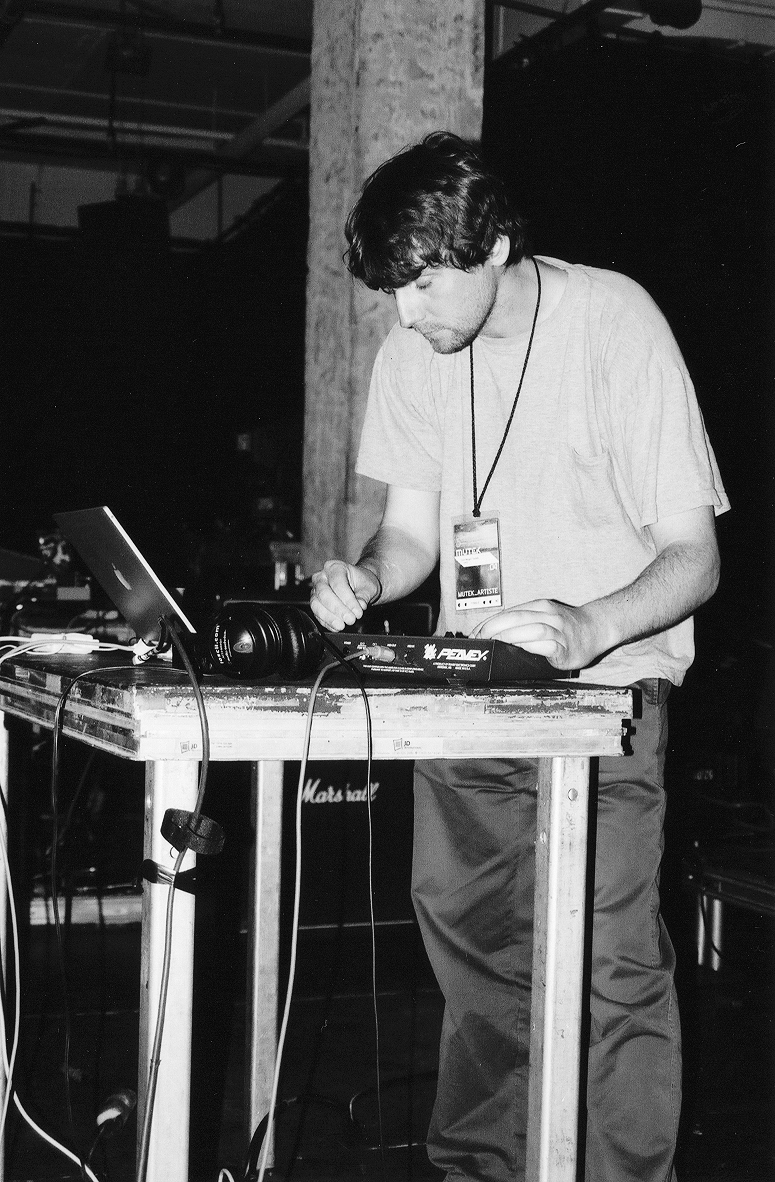
- Loscil playing live at MUTEK 2004.

Background information
- Born: Scott Morgan
- Origin: Vancouver, British Columbia, Canada
- Genres: Electronic; ambient techno; experimental
- Occupations: Composer; record producer
- Years active: 1998–present
- Labels: Kranky; Ghostly International
- Formerly of: Destroyer
- Website: www.loscil.ca

Scott Morgan, also known by the pseudonym Loscil, is a Canadian electronic/ambient music musician from Vancouver, British Columbia. Morgan launched the Loscil project in Vancouver in 1998 while a member of the multimedia collective Multiplex, which curated audiovisual events at an underground cinema called The Blinding Light. The name Loscil is taken from the "looping oscillator" function (loscil) in Csound.

Morgan was also the drummer for the Vancouver indie band Destroyer. As Loscil, he has also produced numerous special projects, remixes, and collaborations with other musicians, including Ryuichi Sakamoto, Murcof/Vanessa Wagner, Sarah Neufeld, Daniel Bejar, bvdub, Rachel Grimes, and Kelly Wyse.

== Early life ==
Loscil graduated from Simon Fraser University's School for the Contemporary Arts, where he studied with computer-music pioneer Barry Truax.

== Career ==
=== 2000s ===
A self-released album titled A New Demonstration of Thermodynamic Tendencies caught the attention of experimental music label Kranky, which signed Morgan on to release his debut album Triple Point in 2001. The album features six tracks off his first independent release as well as four new tracks.

Loscil followed up the release with Submers (2002), an aquatic-themed album. Each track on the album is named after a submarine. The last track on the album was produced in honour of the people who died on the Russian submarine K-141 Kursk.

Loscil's 2004 album First Narrows (a reference to the official name of the Vancouver bridge, also known as Lions' Gate Bridge) marked the incorporation of improvised performances by a number of guest musicians: Nyla Raney on cello, Tim Loewen on guitar and Jason Zumpano on Rhodes piano. Consequently, the music pieces (or tone poems) on First Narrows are "more organic and looser in nature" than Morgan's previous work.

Eight of Loscil's tone poems were featured on the film score of the 2004 documentary ScaredSacred by the award-winning documentary filmmaker Velcrow Ripper.

In 2005, Morgan released Stases, a collection of drones based upon the backgrounds of his work for Kranky. The album was made available as a free download-only release from One Records.

The theme of Loscil's fourth major album, released in 2006, continued the conceptual ascent that each of his previous albums took, from the "subatomic level" and watery depths of Triple Point and Submers, respectively, to the surface alluded to by First Narrows and the sky referenced in Plume.

Plume also continued Morgan's musical integration of other musicians' work into his ambient compositions, including those by Josh August Lindstrom on vibes and xylophone and Krista Michelle Marshall and Stephen Michael Wood on EBow guitar, as well as Zumpano again on piano.

=== 2010s ===
In 2010, Loscil released Endless Falls, which features a guest appearance from Daniel Bejar of Destroyer.

In a 2014 interview with Exberliner, Loscil described a facet of his 2014 album thus: "Vancouver is the ideal setting, and I say that in a sort of ironic way. The nature is so beautiful but it's coupled with human intervention. [My 2014 album] Sea Island is really inspired by that contrast. That area being a nature reserve as well as an industrial area and an airport is both beautiful and kind of horrific. I relish that contrast. There's a balance there that I find interesting from a musical perspective. It opens the door to interpretation."

In 2016, Loscil released Monument Builders. Somewherecold placed it at number 4 on their year-end list of the "Top 10 Albums of the Year".

In 2019, Loscil released Equivalents, a reworking of piano samples inspired by Alfred Stieglitz' black-and-white photographs of clouds. Pitchfork described the album as "full of wispy high pitches that swirl around waves of pink noise and slowly moving tone clusters."

=== 2020s ===
In March 2021, Loscil announced the May 28 release of a new 10-track album called Clara. As basis for the tracks, Loscil used a short orchestral recording, which is from a single three-minute composition performed by a 22-piece string orchestra in Budapest. Upon its release, Clara was met with critical acclaim, attaining on reviews aggregator Metacritic a score of 85, indicating "universal acclaim".

== Discography ==
=== Studio albums ===
- A New Demonstration of Thermodynamic Tendencies (1999)
- Triple Point (Kranky, 2001)
- Submers (Kranky, 2002)
- First Narrows (Kranky, 2004)
- Plume (Kranky, 2006)
- Endless Falls (Kranky, 2010)
- Coast / Range / Arc (Glacial Movements, 2011)
- Sketches from New Brighton (Kranky, 2012)
- Erebus (with Bvdub; Glacial Movements, 2013)
- Sea Island (Kranky, 2014)
- Monument Builders (Kranky, 2016)
- Equivalents (Kranky, 2019)
- Lifelike (2019)
- Faults, Coasts, Lines (2020)
- Adrift (2020)
- Clara (Kranky, 2021)
- Lux Refractions (2021)
- The Sails p.1 (2022)
- The Sails p.2 (2022)
- Colours of Air (with Lawrence English; Kranky, 2023)
- Alta (2023)
- Chroma (with Lawrence English; 2024)
- Umbel (2024)
- Lake Fire (Kranky, 2025)

=== EPs and other releases ===
- Involve Ep02 (Involve Records, 2001)
- Stases (Drones 2001–2005) (One, 2005)
- Strathcona Variations EP (Ghostly International, 2009)
- Versions EP (Bandcamp, 2010)
- Untitled EP (Bandcamp, 2010)
- City Hospital (Wist Rec, 2012)
- Intervalo (featuring Kelly Wyse; Frond, 2013)
- Fury and Hecla (with Fieldhead; Gizeh Records, 2014)
- Adrift (app for iOS and Android; Frond, 2015)
- Suns (cassette only; Frond, 2016)
- The Air at Night (Live at Subtrata) (with Rachel Grimes; Mossgrove Music, 2016)
- Lodge (1631 Recordings, 2016)
- Untitled EP (with Seabuckthorn; Thesis Project, 2017)
- Ash (2025)

=== Tracks featured on ===
- Saturday Morning Empires (Intr Version, 2003)
- The Corporation (documentary film soundtrack, 2003)
- ScaredSacred (documentary film soundtrack, 2004)
- Idol Tryouts: Ghostly International Vol. 2 (Ghostly International, 2006)
- The Sleep Machine (contributed to Chequerboards online Relay project, 2008)
- Osmos (computer game, 2009)
- Prototype 2 (computer game, 2012)
- Hundreds (iOS game, 2013)
- The Bling Ring (film, 2013)
- Divergent (film, 2014)
- From the Sky (film, 2014)
- Suburra: Blood on Rome (Netflix, 2017)
- Lifelike (iOS game, 2019)

== See also ==
- List of ambient music artists
- List of musicians from British Columbia
