= Kaputt (album) =

Studio album by Destroyer
- Released: January 25, 2011
- Recorded: 2008–10
- Studios: JC/DC, Vancouver, British Columbia
- Genres: Soft rock; synth-pop; smooth jazz; electropop; sophisti-pop; indie rock*
- Length: 50:08 (US CD / digital); 70:06 (European CD / vinyl)
- Labels: Merge, Dead Oceans
- Producers: JC/DC (John Collins and David Carswell)

Destroyer chronology
Archer on the Beach (2010)	Kaputt (2011)	Five Spanish Songs (2013)

Kaputt is the ninth album by Canadian indie rock band Destroyer. It was released on January 25, 2011, by Merge Records and Dead Oceans Records. The album was leaked towards the end of 2010. The vinyl edition of the album features bonus material on side three written largely by Destroyer keyboardist Ted Bois. This material is also included in the European CD version of the album credited as 'The Laziest River'.

"Kaputt" was acclaimed by contemporary music critics, who praised the 1980s-inspired production and Bejar’s allusive, cryptic lyrics. It was named by many publications as one of the best albums of 2011, such as NME, Rolling Stone and Pitchfork. Pitchfork also named it the 22nd best album of the 2010s. The album was also named as a shortlisted (one of 10) nominee for the 2011 Polaris Music Prize award.

== Reception ==
Professional ratings
Aggregate scores
Source	Rating
AnyDecentMusic?	8.1/10
Metacritic	84/100
Review scores
Source	Rating
AllMusic	3.5/5 stars
The A.V. Club	A−
Entertainment Weekly	A−
The Guardian	5/5 stars
Los Angeles Times	3.5/4 stars
MSN Music (Expert Witness)	B+
NME	8/10
Pitchfork	8.8/10
Rolling Stone	3.5/4 stars
Spin	7/10

Kaputt received widespread acclaim from music critics upon its release. At Metacritic, which assigns a normalized rating out of 100 to reviews from mainstream critics, the album received an average score of 84, based on 38 reviews, which indicates "universal acclaim". In a five-star review of the album for The Guardian, Alexis Petridis was complimentary of the album's stylistic similarities and lyrical allusions to 1980s popular culture, writing that Kaputt "swerves accusations of archness or kitsch" because of the strength of its songs. Petridis further stated that the album "feels like an open love letter to a vanished pop era: it's unique and warm and beautiful, as love letters are supposed to be." Laura Snapes of NME called it Daniel Bejar's "finest work to date, and excessive, but irresistibly so."

Pitchfork placed Kaputt second on their list of the Top 50 Albums of 2011. It also placed on year-end best album lists from Uncut (number 31) and Mojo (number 41), among others. In August 2014, Kaputt was placed as number 16 on a list published by Pitchfork of The 100 Best Albums of the Decade So Far (2010–2014). In 2019, they ranked the album at number 22 in their list of "The 200 Best Albums of the 2010s"; editor Jeremy D Larson wrote that "Dan Bejar made a masterpiece out of a comedown, a glassy-eyed look at a world starting to collapse." In the same year, Pitchfork also ranked "Chinatown" at number 86 on its list of the 200 Best Songs of the 2010s. In 2026, Pitchfork ranked Kaputt #7 on their list of The 100 Best Indie Rock Albums of All Time.

== Track listing ==
=== CD and digital version ===
All tracks are written by Daniel Bejar, except for lyrics in "Suicide Demo for Kara Walker" which are co-written by Kara Walker and "The Laziest River" co-written by Ted Bois.

No.	Title	Length
1.	"Chinatown"	3:49
2.	"Blue Eyes"	4:07
3.	"Savage Night at the Opera"	4:24
4.	"Suicide Demo for Kara Walker"	8:26
5.	"Poor in Love"	3:26
6.	"Kaputt"	6:18
7.	"Downtown"	3:52
8.	"Song for America"	4:29
9.	"Bay of Pigs (Detail)"	11:19

The European CD version contains "The Laziest River" as a single track after "Song for America".

=== Vinyl version ===
Side one
No.	Title	Length
1.	"Chinatown"	3:49
2.	"Blue Eyes"	4:07
3.	"Savage Night at the Opera"	4:24
4.	"Suicide Demo for Kara Walker"	8:26

Side two
No.	Title	Length
1.	"Poor in Love"	3:26
2.	"Kaputt"	6:18
3.	"Downtown"	3:52
4.	"Song for America"	4:29

Side three: The Laziest River
No.	Title	Length
1.	"Prelude (Estuary)"	4:17
2.	"Nagel's Marimba"	4:28
3.	"The Laziest River"	7:04
4.	"Palm Springs Life"	0:30
5.	"Landing on Water"	3:39

Side four
No.	Title	Length
1.	"Bay of Pigs (Detail)"	11:18

== Personnel ==
The following people contributed to Kaputt:

Destroyer

- Daniel Bejar – composition, musician
- Ted Bois – musician, cover photography
- Pete Bourne – musician
- Nicolas Bragg – musician
- John Collins – musician, engineering, production
- Joseph Shabason – musician

Additional personnel

- Cady Bean-Smith – design
- David Carswell – production
- J.P. Carter – trumpet
- Sibel Thrasher – musician
- Kara Walker – composition
