= Colin Stewart (music producer) =

- Born: November 1, 1974 (age 51)
- Origin: Victoria, British Columbia, Canada
- Occupations: Record producer, audio engineer
- Years active: 1996-present
- Website: www.colinstewartrecording.com

Colin Stewart (born November 1, 1974) is a record producer and audio engineer from Victoria, British Columbia, who has been active recording bands since 1996. His professionalism and his passion for recording made others to call him as one of "Vancouver's top indie-rock engineers".

He owns and operates a studio in Victoria, British Columbia, called The Hive Creative Labs, which has established itself as a musical institution of Canada's west coast independent music scene, having hosted and recorded "Black Mountain, Destroyer, Ladyhawk, Frog Eyes, Hot Hot Heat, and P:ano, along with virtually every other significant West coast indie act". Colin has also recorded albums by Kathryn Calder, Sleepy Sun band, Yukon Blonde, The Cave Singers, Veda Hille, No Kids, Dan Mangan, Pretty Girls Make Graves, and many others.

He is also a founding member of the band Gigi. On 30 September 2013, the recording studio Hive Creative Labs which was a home for a lot of Vancouver acts closed its doors because of Producer Colin Stewart's relocation to Victoria.

He is married to singer-songwriter Kathryn Calder.

== Selected discography ==
Year	Artist	Project	Label	Role
2005	Black Mountain	Black Mountain	Jagjaguwar	Produced / Engineered / Mixed
2005	P:ano	Brigadoon	Mint	Produced / Engineered / Mixed
2005	Pink Mountaintops	Pink Mountaintops	Jagjaguwar	Produced / Engineered / Mixed
2006	Young and Sexy	Panic When You Find It	Mint	Engineered
2006	Pretty Girls Make Graves	Élan Vital	Matador	Produced / Engineered / Mixed
2006	Ladyhawk	Ladyhawk	Jagjaguwar	Produced / Engineered / Mixed
2006	Great Aunt Ida	How They Fly	Northern Electric	Produced / Engineered / Mixed
2006	Rose Melberg	Cast Away the Clouds	Double Agent	Engineered / Mixed
2006	They Shoot Horses Don't They?	Boo Hoo Hoo Boo	Kill Rock Stars	Produced / Engineered / Mixed
2006	The Henry Clay People	Blacklist the Kid With the Red Moustache	The Henry Clay People	Produced / Engineered
2006	Swan Lake	Beast Moans	Jagjaguwar	Mixing Assistant
2007	They Shoot Horses Don't They?	Pick Up Sticks	Kill Rock Stars	Produced / Engineered / Mixed
2007	Lightning Dust	Lightning Dust	Jagjaguwar	Mixed
2007	The Cave Singers	Invitation Songs	Matador	Produced / Engineered / Mixed
2007	Chet	Fight Against Darkness	Aaargh Records	Produced / Engineered / Mixed
2007	Immaculate Machine	Immaculate Machine's Fables	Mint	Produced / Engineered / Mixed
2007	The Waterboys	Book of Lightning	W14/Universal Records	Engineered
2008	Veda Hille	This Riot Life	Ape House	Produced / Engineered / Mixed
2008	Young and Sexy	The Arc	Mint	Produced / Engineered / Mixed
2008	Ten Kens	Ten Kens	Fat Cat	Produced / Engineered / Mixed
2008	Ladyhawk	Shots	Jagjaguwar	Produced / Engineered / Mixed
2008	Black Mountain	In the Future	Jagjaguwar	Produced / Engineered
2008	No Kids	Come Into My House	Tomlab	Produced / Engineered / Mixed
2008	Kellarissa	Flamingo	Mint	Produced / Engineered / Mixed
2009	Chet	Chelsea Silver, Please Come Home	Absolutely Kosher	Produced / Engineered
2009	Sleepy Sun	Embrace	ATP Recordings	Produced / Engineered / Mixed
2009	Immaculate Machine	High on Jackson Hill	Mint	Produced / Engineered / Mixed
2009	Rose Melberg	Homemade Ship	K	Engineered / Mixed
2009	Pink Mountaintops	Outside Love	Jagjaguwar	Engineered
2009	Circlesquare	Songs About Dancing and Drugs	!K7	Mixed
2009	The Cave Singers	Welcome Joy	Matador	Produced / Engineered / Mixed
2009	Duplex	Worser	Mint	Engineered / Mixed
2009	Jon-Rae Fletcher	Oh, Maria	Weewerk	Engineered / Mixed
2010	Kathryn Calder	Are You My Mother?	File Under: Music	Produced / Engineered / Mixed
2010	John Bottomley	The Healing Dream	Self-Released	Produced / Engineered / Mixed
2010	No Kids	Judy At the Grove	Tomlab	Produced / Engineered / Mixed
2010	The New Pornographers	Together	Matador	Engineered
2010	Sleepy Sun	Fever	ATP Recordings	Produced / Engineered / Mixed
2010	Gigi	Maintenant	Tomlab	Produced / Engineered / Mixed
2010	Fanshaw	Dark Eyes	Mint	Produced / Engineered / Mixed
2011	Dan Mangan	Oh Fortune	Arts & Crafts	Produced / Engineered / Mixed
2011	Kathryn Calder	Bright and Vivid	File Under: Music	Produced / Engineered / Mixed
2011	Odonis Odonis	Hollandaze	Fat Cat	Engineered
2011	Slam Dunk	The Shivers	Self-Released	Mixed
2011	Sun Wizard	Positively 4th Avenue	Light Organ	Produced / Engineered / Mixed
2011	The British Columbians	Made for Darker Things	Rural Records	Produced / Engineered
2011	Veda Hille	Young Saint Marie	Ape House	Produced / Engineered / Mixed
2012	A.C. Newman	Shut Down the Streets	Matador	Produced / Engineered / Mixed
2012	Gold & Youth	Gold & Youth	Arts & Crafts	Produced / Engineered
2012	Brasstronaut	Mean Sun	Unfamiliar	Produced / Engineered / Mixed
2012	Yukon Blonde	Tiger Talk	Dine Alone	Produced / Engineered / Mixed
2012	Red Cedar	PFSF	Self Released	Produced / Engineered / Mixed
2013	Northcote	Northcote	Blackbox Music	Produced / Engineered / Mixed
2014	High Ends	Superclass	Dine Alone	Produced / Engineered / Mixed
2015	Dan Mangan + Blacksmith	Club Meds	Arts & Crafts	Produced / Engineered / Mixed
2015	Yukon Blonde	On Blonde	Dine Alone	Produced / Engineered
2015	Kathryn Calder	Kathryn Calder	File Under: Music	Produced / Engineered / Mixed
2016	Odonis Odonis	Post Plague	felte	Mixed
2016	Twin River	Passing Shade	Light Organ	Produced / Engineered / Mixed
2016	Woodpigeon	T R O U B L E		Engineer
2016	Brasstronaut	Brasstronaut		Mixing
2016	Douse	The Light in You Has Left		Produced / Engineered / Mixed
2017	Leeroy Stagger	Love Versus		Producer, Engineer, Mixing
2017	The New Pornographers	Whiteout Conditions		Mixing
2017	Sleepy Sun	Private Tales		Recording engineer, producer
2018	Frontperson	Frontrunner		Producer, recording, mixing
2020	The Tourist Company	St. Helens	Fierce Panda Canada	Producer, Engineer, Mixing
2018	Frontperson	Parade		Producer, recording, mixing
