= List of bands from British Columbia =

The following is a list of bands from British Columbia.

== By city ==
=== Abbotsford ===
- Hedley
- You Say Party

=== Burnaby ===
- The Skulls

=== Chilliwack ===
- The Darkest of the Hillside Thickets
- Mystery Machine
- Pardon My Striptease
- These Kids Wear Crowns

=== Coquitlam ===
- Clumsy Lovers
- Matthew Good Band
- Ten Ways

=== Cranbrook ===
- Lillix

=== Delta ===
- 54-40
- The Higgins
- Theory of a Deadman

=== Kelowna ===
- Bend Sinister
- Cry of the Afflicted
- Excision
- Empyria
- Ginger
- The Grapes of Wrath
- Ladyhawk
- Secret and Whisper
- Stutterfly
- We Are the City
- Yukon Blonde
- Pharm

=== Langley ===
- Fake Shark (formerly Fake Shark – Real Zombie!)
- Gob

=== Maple Ridge ===
- Stabilo
- The Latency

=== Mission ===
- Faber Drive

=== New Westminster ===
- The Devin Townsend Band

=== North Vancouver ===
- D.b.s.
- Spirit of the West
- Soul Decision

=== Richmond ===
- In Medias Res

=== Quesnel ===
- Cruentis

=== Surrey ===
- Good for Grapes

=== Vancouver ===
- Anciients
- Archspire
- Art of Dying
- The Awkward Stage
- Baptists
- The Be Good Tanyas
- Bear Mountain
- The Belle Game
- Big John Bates
- Bison B.C.
- The Black Halos
- Black Mountain
- Blasphemy
- Blue Monday
- The Blue Shadows
- Bob's Your Uncle
- Brand New Unit
- The Brass Action
- Brasstronaut
- The Buttless Chaps
- Calpurnia
- Chilliwack
- The Choir Practice
- Conjure One
- Copyright (Circle C)
- Cub
- Cyberaktif
- Ekkstacy
- Dear Rouge
- Default
- Delerium
- Destroyer
- D.O.A.
- Doug and the Slugs
- Download
- The Dreadnoughts
- Econoline Crush
- The Evaporators
- Forty Foot Echo
- Front Line Assembly
- Headpins
- Hey Ocean!
- Hinterland
- Idle Eyes
- Images in Vogue
- Japandroids
- The Jins
- The Jolts
- Kill Matilda
- Ladyhawk
- Lava Hay
- Limblifter
- LiveonRelease
- Loverboy
- Left Spine Down
- The Manvils
- Maow
- Marianas Trench
- Mecca Normal
- Moev
- Mother Mother
- The New Pornographers
- No Kids
- Nü Sensae
- Numb
- Odds
- ohGr
- The Organ
- Ox
- P:ano
- The Pack A.D.
- The Paperboys
- Payolas
- Peach Pit
- Pink Mountaintops
- The Poppy Family
- Pointed Sticks
- The Powder Blues Band
- Pride Tiger
- Prism
- Pure
- Rascalz
- Rat Silo
- The Real McKenzies
- Rose Chronicles
- Rymes with Orange
- Said the Whale
- Saints & Sinners
- The Salteens
- Sandalspring
- Skinny Puppy
- Slow
- Snowbeast
- Social Deviantz
- Sons of Freedom
- Soul Decision
- Straight Lines
- Strapping Young Lad
- Strange Advance
- The Subhumans
- Sumac
- Superconductor
- Sweatshop Union
- Sweeney Todd
- Swollen Members
- Synæsthesia
- The Tear Garden
- The Tourist Company
- Trooper
- The Veer Union
- The Washboard Union
- West End Girls
- White Lung
- Xana
- Young and Sexy
- Young Canadians
- Young Saints
- Zimmers Hole
- The Zolas
- Zolty Cracker
- Zumpano

=== Victoria ===
- 3 Inches of Blood
- Acres Of Lions
- Armchair Cynics
- Class of 1984
- Current Swell
- Dayglo Abortions
- Frog Eyes
- The Hanson Brothers
- Hot Hot Heat
- Immaculate Machine
- Jets Overhead
- Jon and Roy
- The Laundronauts
- Mythos
- Nomeansno
- Ocie Elliott
- Shapes and Sizes
- Showbusiness Giants
- Spiritbox
- Unleash the Archers
- Zerbin

=== White Rock ===
- Hawking

== See also ==
- Music of Vancouver
- List of bands from Canada
- List of Canadian musicians
- List of musicians from British Columbia
