= Gigi (Canadian band) =

Canadian indie pop band

- Origin: Vancouver, British Columbia, Canada
- Genres: Pop, indie pop
- Years active: 2005–present
- Labels: Tomlab
- Members: Nick Krgovich; Colin Stewart
- Website: www.myspace.com/gigitheband

Gigi is a Canadian music recording project based in Vancouver, formed in 2005 by the songwriter Nick Krgovich and record producer Colin Stewart after Stewart acquired two vintage plate reverb units and asked Krgovich to write songs — Phil Spector-inspired 1950s and 1960s-style pop music — to make use of them. With 40 musicians from indie rock bands collaborating, the group released an album, Maintenant, on the Tomlab label in 2010, to mostly positive reviews.

== History ==
Krgovich is known for his work as a member of P:ano and of No Kids. Stewart has previously worked as a record producer and recording engineer for such groups as Black Mountain, The Cave Singers and Destroyer. Regarding the origins of the project, Krgovich said, "Colin Stewart from the Hive studios just acquired these huge vintage plate reverb units and he really wanted to use them as if he was recording The Crystals or something, so he asked me to write some 'classic'-sounding pop songs to be recorded live off the floor, by a large group of musicians, Phil Spector-style." In the end, 40 artists were included as collaborators, with musicians such as Owen Pallett, Mirah, Karl Blau, and members of Ladyhawk and Weathered Pines.

The group was one of three to be selected to be part of the first Indie Band Residency at the Banff Centre in 2008, an opportunity for up-and-coming bands to spend two weeks writing and recording, with access to studios, producers and engineers. (The other two bands were Ohbijou and the Adam Brown.)

The album, Maintenant (the French word for now), was recorded over three years and released in 2010.

== Reception ==
In an album review, PopMatters said, "At its best, Maintenant feels both effortless and timeless—much like the classic pop from which its architects clearly draw so much inspiration." Fast Forward Weekly found the sound to be "like a sampler from a long-forgotten '50s record label, spotlighting ballads and upbeat twisters that should have been floating on AM waves for the last half-century." Chart magazine's reviewer praised the "varied voices", which "ensure once the retro-kitsch has worn off, listeners will stick around." The critic Tom Harrison, of The Province, was mixed in his review, writing, "Krgovich and Stewart don't quite get it right as there are too many singers and players to manage, but that is part of the charm."

The Allmusic review noted that the album "succeeds in every way a project like this should: that is, it manages to fulfill a fantasy (i.e. one in which Rose Melberg is transported back to the early '60s, where she is the lead singer in a stellar girl group) without sounding hokey or gimmicky," and in a generally favourable review, Pitchfork Media wrote, "Gigi understand that the most important period-era sound to capture here isn't a "Be My Baby" kick-drum boom or a Bacharachian bossa nova swing (though both are in full effect), but rather the sound of repression—of forcing a smile while your heart sinks, of maintaining appearances while you're dying inside."

== Discography ==
- 2010: Maintenant

=== Track listing ===
1. "No, My Heart Will Go On" (w/ Chorus)
2. "The Hundredth Time" (w/ Duffy Driediger and Ryan Peters)
3. "Dreams of Romance" (w/ Zac Pennington)
4. "Alone at the Pier" (w/ Rose Melberg)
5. "Everyone Can Tell" (w/ Ryan Beattie)
6. "One Woman Show" (w/ Joey Cook)
7. "I'm Not Coming Out Tonight" (w/ Marissa Johnson and Sydney Vermont)
8. "Some Second Best" (w/ Chorus) *
9. "I Can't Bring Myself to Smile" (w/ Bobby Birdman and Katy Davidson)
10. "Strolling Past the Old Graveyard" (w/ Karl Blau)
11. "The Marquee" (w/ Katie Eastburn)
12. "Impossible Love" (w/ Chorus)
13. "Won't Someone Tell Me?" (w/ Mirah)
14. "I'll Quit" (w/ Owen Pallett)
15. "'Neathe the Streetlights" (w/ Nick Krgovich)
- missing from vinyl release
