= Are You My Mother? (album) =

Studio album by Kathryn Calder
- Released: June 29, 2010
- Genre: Indie Rock
- Length: 36:09
- Label: File Under: Music
- Producer: Colin Stewart

Kathryn Calder chronology
Are You My Mother? (2010)	Bright and Vivid (2011)

Are You My Mother? is a 2010 album released by Canadian musician Kathryn Calder. It is Calder's debut solo album. She had previously released records as a member of Immaculate Machine and The New Pornographers.

== Background ==
The album was named after the children's book with the same name. It was recorded when Calder was caring for her sick mother, and the project was put on hold when her mother died. A feature in Victoria's Times Colonist noted that the album features her mother's "spirit and influence, but not the sadness associated with her death".

== Recording ==
The album was recorded in Calder's family home in Victoria, British Columbia. After touring with The New Pornographers for three years, Calder began work on the album. Since she missed home and was caring for her mother, she set up a home studio with producer Colin Stewart. New Pornographer bandmates Todd Fancey, Kurt Dahle, Neko Case, and members of Ladyhawk and Frog Eyes play on the album.

== Reception ==
Professional ratings
Review scores
Source	Rating
AllMusic	3.5/5 stars
The A.V. Club	B+
The Montreal Gazette	4/5 stars
Pitchfork Media	(6.2/10)
PopMatters	6/10 stars

Amanda Ash of Exclaim! praised the album as "melodically diverse and incredibly easy to sink into" and wrote that the songs are "perfectly manicured soundscapes". François Marchand of the Vancouver Sun gave the album a favorable review, stating that it is a "fine and poignant indie-pop record".

== Track listing ==
Song	Writer(s)	Length
"Slip Away"		4:47
"Low"		4:08
"Castor and Pollux"		2:56
"Arrow"		2:52
"If You Only Knew"		3:15
"Follow Me Into the Hills"		3:27
"Down the River"		3:51
"Day Long Past Its Prime"		3:01
"So Easily"		4:13
"All It Is"		3:39
