= Ladyhawk =

Ladyhawk may refer to:

- Ladyhawk (band), a Canadian indie rock band
  - Ladyhawk (album), their 2006 studio album
- Ladyhawk (comics), two fictional characters in the Marvel Comics' series Spider-Girl
- "Ladyhawk", a 2019 song by Yanni

== See also ==
- Ladyhawke (disambiguation)
