= Bright and Vivid =

Studio album by Kathryn Calder
- Released: October 25, 2011
- Genre: Folk-pop; indie pop
- Length: 41:30
- Label: File Under: Music
- Producer: Kathryn Calder; Colin Stewart

Kathryn Calder chronology
Are You My Mother? (2010)	Bright and Vivid (2011)	Kathryn Calder (2015)

Singles from Bright and Vivid
- 1. "Who Are You?" Released: August 18, 2011; 2. "Turn a Light On" Released: December 21, 2011

Bright and Vivid is the second studio album by Canadian musician Kathryn Calder, released on October 25, 2011, via File Under: Music. It was produced by Calder with her husband Colin Stewart and was led by the singles "Who Are You?" and "Turn a Light On". The album was dedicated to the memory of her parents, whom both died before its release. Like her debut, Are You My Mother? (2010), it was recorded at her family home in Victoria, British Columbia.

Described as folk pop and indie pop, Bright and Vivid expands upon the sound that Calder pursued in her debut, favoring more of an electronic sound and often using programmed drums and effects, like reverb and distortion. Lyrically, it moves away from the introspection of her debut to a more outgoing approach. Upon release, it was met with generally positive reception from critics and was longlisted for the 2012 Polaris Music Prize.

== Background and recording ==
Bright and Vivid is dedicated to Calder's parents, Lynn and Stu. The making of her debut record, Are You My Mother? (2010), had been informed by her mother, who was suffering from ALS. On July 30, 2009, her mother died, later followed by her father in 2010. Before its release, she began writing for her second album. By the time of its recording, Calder's brother Stephen and his family had moved in with her at their old family home in Victoria, British Columbia. Calder told Exclaim! that, while her debut had been recorded there in her mother's living room, her updated living situation had caused her to relocate "one floor up to my living room". Bright and Vivid was made with producer and husband Colin Stewart.

Primarily backed by a band consisting of Lane Arndt, Stefan Bozenick, and Marek Tyler, some other notable contributors to the album include Jon Wurster (Superchunk, Mountain Goats), experimental musician Jesse Zubot, Ford Pier, Darcy Hancock (Ladyhawk), and Paul Rigby (Neko Case).

== Composition ==
Critics have described the album as folk-pop and indie pop. Whereas Are You My Mother? featured relatively modest arrangements, Bright and Vivid favors a more expansive sound, utilizing a mix of acoustic and electronic instruments, with more emphasis on the electronics than her debut. Calder's alto vocals are often mixed as simply another element of the music, frequently with significant reverb. The lyrics, meanwhile, are centered around relationships, though in contrast to the more introspective approach favored in her debut, Bright and Vivid is more outwardly focused.

Album opener "One Two Three" begins with a minute-long, feedback-heavy instrumental introduction, later adding in synthesizers, drums, then acoustic guitar. The second track, the more synth-pop-oriented "Who Are You?", features vocal harmonizing from Calder, such as during the titular chorus. "Turn a Light On" is stylistically more similar to her debut record, starting as a ballad rooted in country music before reaching a climax at the end. The song "Walking in My Sleep" has the most in common with the power pop style that is typical of the New Pornographers.

The next track, the mostly instrumental "All the Things", was the longest of Calder's solo career by that point, reaching six minutes in total. After a series of guitars and noise effects, Calder starts singing, albeit low in the mix and with considerable reverb. Around the halfway point, the song shifts to guitar-oriented rock. Next, the heavily electronic "Right Book" makes prominent use of synthesizer effects, and, like some other tracks, distorted, programmed drums and vocal reverb. The warm quality of Calder's voice are starkly juxtaposed with the lyrics in the chorus of "New Frame of Mind", where she sings "How many throats will be cut till I see/ What is beyond the breach?" The following track, "City of Sounds", is another example of vocal harmonizing on the album.

== Promotion, singles, and release ==
Calder began teasing a new album on February 4, 2011, on her website, saying that a new album would be finished soon, with the mixing and the logistics surrounding its release left to finalize. Bright and Vivid was officially announced the following August 18 alongside its lead single, "Who Are You?", followed by a music video on September 29 directed by Jesse Ewles and Cameron Tomsett. Both had worked on the video for "Slip Away", a previous song of Calder's.

Bright and Vivid was released on October 25, 2011 via File Under: Music. A second single, "Turn a Light On", followed on December 21, with its music video premiering on Paste. It was directed by Geoffrey Tomlin-Hood and Leif Parker. While on tour, Calder was supported onstage by Stefan Bozenich on bass, Marek Tyler on drums, and Ryan Beattie (Himalayan Bear) on guitar, all of whom except for Beattie contributed to the studio recording.

== Critical reception ==
Professional ratings
Aggregate scores
Source	Rating
Metacritic	78/100
Review scores
Source	Rating
AllMusic	4/5 stars
Paste	7.0/10
Tiny Mix Tapes	3/5 stars

According to the review aggregator Metacritic, Bright and Vivid received "generally favorable reviews" based on a weighted average score of 78 out of 100 from eight critic scores. Some critics thought Bright and Vivid was an improvement upon her debut. For example K. Ross Hoffman of AllMusic said it felt more polished and deliberate, and it establishes her as being "every bit as worthy as her big-deal bandmates" from the New Pornographers. Hoffman also thought the album avoided becoming too "overstuffed" by balancing its intricate arrangements and sounds with a subtle approach that allow the songs to "blossom gradually".

Joe Hemmerling, reviewing the album for Tiny Mix Tapes, said that while some songs came across as too "saccharine" or "aimless", Bright and Vivid acts as a "solid follow-up" by expanding Calder's musical range while retaining its predecessor's catchiness. CMJ's Luis Paez-Pumar singled out "Who Are You?" as the most demonstrative of Calder's musical evolution, explaining that it "is much more complex and layered ... but the singing is just as swooning" in comparison to Are You My Mother? Jon Pareles of The New York Times was more mixed in their assessment, saying that although it was a mostly "welcoming" experience, the record could be overwhelming at times with the complexity of its arrangements. In Paste, Luke Larsen opined that much of the record felt as if Calder was being unnecessarily too eager to "prove herself" as a solo artist, largely taking issue with the album's frequent use of drum samples and vocal reverb.

On June 12, 2012, it was announced that the album was longlisted for the 2012 Polaris Music Prize.

== Track listing ==
All tracks are written by Kathryn Calder.

Bright and Vivid track listing
No.	Title	Length
1.	"One Two Three"	4:26
2.	"Who Are You?"	4:03
3.	"Turn a Light On"	3:21
4.	"Walking in My Sleep"	3:25
5.	"All the Things"	6:00
6.	"Right Book"	4:50
7.	"New Frame of Mind"	4:17
8.	"City of Sounds"	3:30
9.	"Five More Years"	4:03
10.	"Younger Than We've Ever Been"	3:35
Total length:		41:30

== Personnel ==
Except where noted, credits are adapted from Apple Music.

- Kathryn Calder – vocals (all tracks), synthesizer (1, 2, 5, 6, 9), tambourine (1), handclaps (2), percussion (3, 6, 7), vibraphone (4, 5), Rhodes piano (4), cello (5, 7, 8), baritone guitar (5), piano (6, 10), guitar (6), electric guitar (7), organ (7), sound effects (9), bass (10), pump organ (10), production
- Bryce Janssens – vocals (1–3), bass (4)
- Marek Taylor – drums (1, 3, 5, 7–9), handclaps (2)
- Lane Arndt – acoustic guitar (1, 2, 5, 8, 9), electric guitar (1, 9), guitar (3)
- Jesse Zubot – violin (1, 3, 9), strings (10)
- Ben Kalb – cello (1, 3, 9)
- Matt Skillings – vocals (1, 3), bass (1)
- Stefan Udell – string arrangement (1), orchestration (3)
- Ford Pier – French horn (1), electric guitar (4, 6)
- Darcy Hancock – electric guitar (1, 5, 7)
- Stefan Bozenich – bass (2, 3, 5, 7–9)
- Paul Rigby – mandolin (2, 3), electric guitar (2, 8), pedal steel guitar (3)
- Patsy Klein – vocals (2, 4, 7, 10)
- Crystal Dorval – vocals (2, 5–7), ukulele (5, 9)
- Dean Tzenos – drum programming (2, 5, 6), electric guitar (5, 6), additional production (2, 5, 6)
- Megan Boddy – vocals (3, 5, 6, 8, 9), ukulele (5)
- Jon Wurster – drums (4)
- Colin Stewart – drum programming (5), production and recording
- Liz Reed – vocals (8–10)
- Brooke Gallupe – vocals (9)
- Barry Mirochnick – drums (10)
- Stuart McKillop – mastering at Hive Creation Studios
- Meghan Hildebrand – artwork and design
- Caleb Beyers – photography
