= Ryan Peters (musician) =

Canadian musician

- Origin: Kelowna, British Columbia, Canada
- Genres: Rock
- Occupation(s): Musician, songwriter
- Instrument(s): Vocals, drums
- Member of: Ladyhawk

Ryan Peters is a Canadian musician based in Vancouver, British Columbia. He is the drummer in indie band Ladyhawk and also contributes to the vocals and lyrics. Peters was one of the original members of the Vancouver incarnation of Jon-Rae and the River, and also was part of the band Alpha BMX. He partnered up with bandmate Darcy Hancock in a side-project called Sports. Peters also tours with Lightning Dust and Daniel Romano.

== Discography ==
Year	Title	Label	Band
2006	Ladyhawk	Jagjaguwar	Ladyhawk
2007	Fight for Anarchy	Jagjaguwar	Ladyhawk
2008	Shots	Jagjaguwar	Ladyhawk
2009	Saigon		Time Cookie
2009	Summertime Cookie		Time Cookie
2009	Drumheller	Triple Crown Audio	Sports
2010	Lost in Space		Time Cookie
2010	Time 4 Chocolate Cookies		Time Cookie
2010	Fly Around the Sun		Time Cookie
