= Veda Hille =

- Hille on the 'Bedlam!' music video shoot, 2006.

Background information
- Born: August 11, 1968 (age 57); Vancouver, British Columbia, Canada
- Genres: Indie rock, experimental, baroque pop, art rock
- Occupations: Musician, songwriter, composer
- Instruments: Vocals, tenor guitar, piano, accordion, keyboards, banjo
- Years active: 1992–present
- Label: APE
- Website: vedahille.com

Veda Hille (born August 11, 1968) is a Canadian singer-songwriter, keyboardist and tenor guitar player from Vancouver, British Columbia. She writes songs about love and tragedy, as well as about topical British Columbia subjects. As well as solo work, she has taken part in many musical collaborations, and has organized two recording projects, Duplex! and The Fits.

== Early life ==
Hille was born in 1968 in Vancouver, and grew up both there and in nearby Langley. She started playing piano when she was six, at first studying classical music, and later pop music, and jazz. She attended Vancouver Community College, as well art school studying sculpture, film, and performance art. Hille also plays banjo and accordion.

== Career ==
Hille worked for a year as a lounge musician. She began writing music in 1990, and self-released a cassette, Songs About People and Buildings, in 1992. She started performing locally, and later across Canada.

Hille set up her own label, Ball of Flames, and in 1994 released her first CD, Path of a Body with Stephen Nikleva, Steve Lazin, and Martin Walton; next was a pop album, Spine, recorded with various Canadian musicians.

By 1997, she had assembled a band and had toured in Canada, the US, and Germany. Two performances in Bremen, Germany were recorded and released in 1997 as Live at Women in (E)Motion.

In 1997, Hille began working with Martin Walton (bass, lap steel, ukulele), Ford Pier (guitar, organ, French Horn), Peggy Lee (cello), Barry Mirochnick (drums, xylophone, singing saw, and found instruments), and later Patsy Klein (vocals, flute). The members of this group have performed in many shows and festivals together, and have collaborated on five records.

Hille was commissioned by Mascall Dance to create the score for their choreography "The Brutal Telling", about the Canadian painter Emily Carr. All the lyrics were taken from Ms. Carr's journals, letters, and published writings. The songs were released in 1998 as the album Here is a picture (Songs for E Carr).

In 1999, Hille, along with Oh Susanna and Kinnie Starr, went out on the "Scrappy Bitches Tour". The same year, she recorded You do not live in this world alone, a collection of fairy tales for adults.

Beginning in 2000, Hille began collaborating with Christof Migone, to create a set of sparse computer manipulated songs. The songs were later released in 2004 as the album Escape Songs.

In 2000, Hille commissioned Vancouver video artist Shawn Chappelle to make a 50-minute video showing the northern landscapes of Canada. She created a formal show designed for small theatres and art spaces, during which a video is projected on a large screen as Hille plays the show's music on a grand piano. In 2001, she released this music as Field Study, a solo album of songs about science and nature. Half of the album is entitled 'Yukon Suite', written about a three-week journey to the Canadian territory.

In 2002, Hille created a song cycle for the Vancouver Folk Music Festival's 25th anniversary. The songs were performed live at the 2002 festival by various musicians, along with a video by Shawn Chappelle, and was the subject of a limited edition CD, Silver. Her live album, Auditorium, recorded during two performances at the Vancouver East Cultural Centre, was also released that year.

In 2005, Hille organized the band Duplex!, which recorded two albums of rock music for children, Ablum and Worser. She is also a member of The Fits, which perform vaudeville duets.

In 2005, Hille signed with Ape Records, run by XTC's Andy Partridge. That year she released Return of the Kildeer, with guest musicians Dan Goldman, Nick Krgovich and Larissa Loyva of P:ano, John Millard, Patsy Klein, Kim Barlow, Suzie Ungerleider, Cam Giroux, Ford Pier, Brian Travers-Smith, Ida Nilsen, Barry Mirochnick, Selina Martin, and Christine Duncan.

With a full band, Hille made a studio recording, This Riot Life, of edited and arranged Christian hymns and reflections on personal tragedy. The album was released in early 2008. The PuSh International Performing Arts Festival in Vancouver commissioned part of the writing of the album.

In 2009, Hille independently released Do You Want What I Have Got?, a collection of live recordings of songs from Hille's theatre scores. Then in 2011, she released Young Saint Marie, a collection of songs written by Buffy Sainte-Marie and Neil Young, recorded live and in studio with the CBC Radio Orchestra and her band, with arrangements by Giorgio Magnanensi of Vancouver New Music Society.

Hille is the in-house composer for Theatre Replacement; she collaborates with them on at least one show per year, including Empty Orchestra, YUFO, Dress Me Up In Your Love, and the yearly East Van Panto. She scored Bonnie Sherr Klein's NFB film Shameless: The ART of Disability, as well as producing records for other musicians. She wrote the songs for the 2011 Leaky Heaven/NeWorld theatre production Peter Panties, written by Niall McNeil and Marcus Youssef, which lead to the release of Peter Panties, a live studio soundtrack of the songs, performed by Hille and the local teenage band The Bank Dogs. She collaborated again with McNeil and Youssef for Neworld Theatre's King Arthur's Night, a retelling of the King Arthur legend developed with a mixed ability cast. The record of that show was released in 2017.

Hille's 20th album, Love Waves, was written in Berlin and recorded in East Van with John Collins of the New Pornographers. It was released in 2016.

Hille collaborates regularly with playwright/director Amiel Gladstone. Together with writer Bill Richardson they wrote and premiered Do You Want What I Have Got? A Craigslist Cantata in 2012 at the Arts Club Theatre. In 2016, Hille and Gladstone premiered Onegin, an adaptation of Pushkin's poem and Tchaikovsky's opera. Onegin toured across Canada, had a US premiere in Boston, and opened in Russian translation at the Taganka Theatre in Moscow in 2021.

In 2020, Hille premiered the solo show Little Volcano, created with Maiko Yamamoto and James Long of Theatre Replacement.

In 2021 Nicholas Krgovich released an album of Hille covers titled This Spring. In 2022 Hille released Beach Practice, produced by Krgovich.

When Hille put together an ensemble to perform Beach Practice, the Veda Hille Sisterhood, or VHS, was born, consisting of Patsy Klein: vocals, Lucien Durey: vocals, Nicholas Krgovich: vocals, keyboards, Thom Gill: guitar, and Julia Chien: vibraphone and percussion. That band release a 5-song ep, recorded live at the Beach Practice release party, on June 23, 2023.

== Personal life ==
Hille is married to Justin Kellam, drummer of the now defunct bands P:ano and No Kids.

== Discography ==
- Songs about people and buildings (1992); independent cassette; out of print.
- Path of a body (1994); full-length CD
- Spine (1996)
- Live at Women in (E)Motion (1997)
- Here is a picture (Songs for E Carr) (1998)
- You do not live in this world alone (1999)
- Field Study (2001)
- Silver (2002); out of print.
- Auditorium (2002)
- Escape Songs (2004)
- Return of the Kildeer (Ape Records, 2005)
- Ablum by Duplex! (2005)
- The Fits Seize to Amaze (2006)
- This Riot Life (2008)
- Worser by Duplex! (2009)
- Do You Want What I Have Got? (2009)
- Young Saint Marie (2011)
- Peter Panties (2013)
- The Fits The Fist (2013)
- Love Waves (2016)
- Songs from Onegin (2016)
- King Arthur's Night (2017)
- Little Volcano (2020)
- Songs from Do You Want What I Have Got? (2021)
- Beach Practice (2022)

== Collaborations ==
- "Wayward" (1995) with Cate Friesen
- "A Recent Future" (1995) with James Keelaghan
- "Silence" (1996) with Tara MacLean
- "Brandspankin'" (1997) with Michael O'Connell
- "While You Slept" (1997) with Andy Stochansky
- "Johnstown" (1999) with Oh Susanna
- "Live for Today" (2000) piano with Kelsie Olivia Love
- When It's Dark And It's Summer (2002), album with P:ano
- The Den (2004), album with P:ano
- Champ (2007), album with Kim Barlow
- Piano and accompanying vocals on Dan Mangan's song The Indie Queens Are Waiting (2009)
- Good Hand Bad Hand (2016), album with Rodney Graham
- Aurora Tears (2016), performed with Harold Budd
