= Spin cycle =

Spin cycle refers to the spinning wash cycle of a washing machine.

Spin Cycle may also refer to:

- Spin Cycle: Inside the Clinton Propaganda Machine (1998), a book by Howard Kurtz
- "Spin Cycle" (2009), a song from The Laundronauts' LP The Laundronauts Come Clean
- "Spin Cycle" (2010), a song from electronic musician Arthur Loves Plastic's EP Touch
- "Spin Cycle", an episode of Canadian television sitcom Corner Gas
- TNA Spin Cycle, a webcast forming part of TNA Today
