= The Hope Slide =

- Origin: Vancouver, British Columbia, Canada
- Genres: Dream pop Shoegaze; Electronica
- Years active: 2008–present
- Label: Submerged
- Members: Michaela Galloway; John Lucas
- Website: The Hope Slide

The Hope Slide is a Canadian band formed in 2008 in Vancouver. The band is named after the Hope Slide, a rock slide that occurred early in the morning of January 9, 1965.

== History ==
The Hope Slide's self-titled debut album was released on September 28, 2010, on Submerged Records, is a concept album befitting the band's chosen name. The songs deal with disasters and upheavals of all kinds, including the ill-fated Franklin Expedition ("Passage"), the Triangle Shirtwaist Factory fire of 1911 ("In Ashe"), the Space Shuttle Challenger disaster, and the impact of the Chernobyl disaster on the surrounding ecosystem ("Red Forest"). "In Ashe" was inspired by a landmark event in the history of workers' rights, while "Parish" confronts the U.S. government's failed response to Hurricane Katrina, and "Topple the Sky" deals with the 2009–2010 Iranian election protests.

Writing in the Brock Press, Marshal Hignett described The Hope Slide as "an astounding debut release which is bound to have a tremendous impact on the Canadian electronic scene in the future." The British blog indie-mp3.co.uk noted that the duo's music is "not shoegaze in its classic sense but is more in line with the ambient electrical stuff put out by the likes of M83 and Ulrich Schnauss." SlowdiveMusic Blog called the album "a journey through grandiose soundscapes, overwhelming undertows, and brilliant craftsmanship", declaring it "the dreampop/shoegaze monument of the year."

The Hope Slide's members, Michaela Galloway (vocals, Moog) and John Lucas (guitar, bass, keyboards, beats), were formerly in Hinterland, a band that, through its eight-year, three-album run, consistently made the Canadian college-radio charts, performed all over the country (including on a nationally broadcast television show), and generally built a cult following. Whereas Hinterland was a five-piece rock band; however, the Hope Slide leans more toward the electronic end of things, albeit with all the moody dream-pop atmospherics for which Lucas and Galloway are known.

On October 19, 2010, Submerged Records released The Hope Slide Remixed, a free five-song EP, featuring remixes by Vigestol (aka Geoff Nilson, formerly of Way to Go, Einstein), the Ludvico Treatment, Area Man, Sinewave, and Killsaly.

== Members ==
- Michaela Galloway: vocals, Moog Little Phatty
- John Lucas: guitar, bass, keyboards, beats

== Discography ==
- The Hope Slide (2010)
- The Hope Slide Remixed (five-song EP, 2010)
