= Safe Amplification Site Society =

Non-profit organization

The Safe Amplification Site Society, also known as Safe Amp or SASS, is a non-profit organization that promotes the legitimacy of music and arts within Vancouver for participants of all ages. Safe Amp is a member-based organization, and relies on donations for funding. Many of the directors of Safe Amp are prominent musicians in the Vancouver community, including co-founder and general director Ryan McCormick of Collapsing Opposites and They Shoot Horses, Don't They?. The organization was created with inspiration from such organizations as Seattle's The Vera Project and The Smell in Los Angeles.

A key initiative for Safe Amp has been establishing a "permanent, legal, alcohol-free, all-ages space for music and arts events" in Vancouver. General advocacy on this issue is also a key activity; Safe Amp aims to put pressure on the municipal and provincial governments and British Columbia's Liquor Control and Licensing Board to amend provincial liquor laws. Recent years have seen many popular live music venues in Vancouver close due to strict liquor licensing regulations, gentrification, the rapid development of condominiums, or noise complaints in the densely populated city centre.

Safe Amp is known for its do-it-yourself all-ages events, which have included concerts and film screenings. In 2012, Safe Amp organized a series of workshops and festivals under the title "Skills for Performing Artists through Community Engagement" ("S.P.A.C.E. Camp") that included notable speakers such as Fugazi/Minor Threat frontman Ian MacKaye and Nardwuar the Human Serviette, performers including Calvin Johnson and The Evaporators, and representatives from organizations including Mint Records and K Records.

The organization operated a part-time temporary venue in Vancouver's Grandview-Woodland neighbourhood in the former Astorino's dining hall at 1739 Venables Street, hosting all-ages music events and festivals until August 2015. Safe Amp also hosted events in local shops and community halls available for private rental, but the rapid increase of market-rate rental fees in these venues posed further barriers to the volunteer-run organizers. Many of Safe Amp's social media feeds have not been updated since 2019, presumably due to the restrictions placed upon live music venues in the Vancouver area during the COVID-19 pandemic.
