= Ryan Peters =

Ryan Peters may refer to:

- Ryan Peters (footballer) (born 1987), English footballer
- Ryan Peters (politician), American politician in New Jersey
- Ryan Peters (musician), Canadian singer-songwriter
- Spose (Ryan Michael Peters, born 1985), American rapper
