= Banshee (album) =

Studio album
- Released: February 19, 2016
- Genre: Rock
- Length: 34:47
- Label: Jagjaguwar
- Producer: Randall Dunn; The Cave Singers

chronology
Naomi (2013)	Banshee (2016)

Professional ratings
Aggregate scores
Source	Rating
Metacritic	62/100
Review scores
Source	Rating
AllMusic	4/5 stars

Banshee is the fifth studio album by American band The Cave Singers. It was released on February 19, 2016 under Jagjaguwar.

== Track listing ==
No.	Title	Length
1.	"That's Why"	4:13
2.	"Lost in the Tide"	3:17
3.	"Southern Bell"	3:19
4.	"Who's Well"	3:06
5.	"Strip Mine"	3:07
6.	"Cool Criminal"	4:19
7.	"The Swimmer"	3:27
8.	"Fade Away"	2:50
9.	"Christmas Night"	3:28
10.	"Light in the House"	3:41

== Personnel ==
- Pete Quirk – vocals, guitar, melodica, harmonica
- Derek Fudesco – guitar, bass pedals
- Marty Lund – drums, guitar
- Randall Dunn - engineer, producer
- The Cave Singers - engineer, producer
- Jason Ward - mastering
- Cody Fennell - artwork
- Joe Carr - cover
- Lauren Rodriguez - cover
- Jeff Alvarez - layout
