= High on Jackson Hill =

Studio album by Immaculate Machine
- Released: April 28, 2009
- Genre: Indie rock
- Label: Mint Records

Immaculate Machine chronology
Immaculate Machine's Fables (2007)	High on Jackson Hill (2009)

Professional ratings
Review scores
Source	Rating
AllMusic	3.5/5 stars
Pitchfork Media	(4.5/10)

High on Jackson Hill is the fourth studio album by Immaculate Machine, released April 28, 2009 on Mint Records.

== Track listing ==
No.	Title	Length
1.	"Don't Build the Bridge"
2.	"Thank Me Later"
3.	"You Destroyer"
4.	"Sound the Alarms"
5.	"He's a Biter"
6.	"I Know it's Not as Easy"
7.	"Primary Colours"
8.	"Neighbours Don't Mind"
9.	"And it Was"
10.	"You Got Us Into This Mess"
11.	"Only Love You for Your Car"
12.	"Blurry Days"

== Personnel ==
- Brooke Gallupe – vocals, guitar, bass, organ, percussion
- Kathryn Calder – vocals, keyboards
- Luke Kozlowski – vocals, background vocals
- Marek Tyler - drums, percussions
- Caitlin Gallupe – artwork, background vocals
- Leslie Rewega – guitar ("Primary Colours"), background vocals, percussion
