= No Witch =

Studio album by The Cave Singers
- Released: February 22, 2011
- Recorded: Vancouver
- Genre: Indie rock Indie folk
- Length: 42:39
- Label: Jagjaguwar
- Producer: Randall Dunn

The Cave Singers chronology
Welcome Joy (2009)	No Witch (2011)	Naomi (2013)

Professional ratings
Aggregate scores
Source	Rating
Metacritic	67/100
Review scores
Source	Rating
AllMusic	4/5 stars

No Witch is the third studio album by American band The Cave Singers. It was released in February 2011 under Jagjaguwar.

== Track listing ==
No.	Title	Length
1.	"Gifts and the Raft"	2:34
2.	"Swim Club"	3:01
3.	"Black Leaf"	3:22
4.	"Falls"	4:28
5.	"Outer Realms"	4:45
6.	"Haller Lake"	3:54
7.	"All Land Crabs and Divinity Ghosts"	4:00
8.	"Clever Creatures"	3:14
9.	"Haystacks"	3:17
10.	"Distant Sures"	3:11
11.	"Faze Wave"	3:28
12.	"No Prosecution If We Bail"	3:23

== Personnel ==
- Pete Quirk – vocals, guitar, melodica, harmonica
- Derek Fudesco – guitar, bass pedals
- Marty Lund – drums, guitar
