= Immaculate Machine's Fables =

Studio album by Immaculate Machine
- Released: May 29, 2007
- Recorded: 2006
- Genre: Indie rock
- Label: Mint Records
- Producer: Colin Stewart; John Collins; David Carswell

Immaculate Machine chronology
Les Uns Mais Pas Les Autres (2006)	Immaculate Machine's Fables (2007)	High on Jackson Hill (2009)

Professional ratings
Review scores
Source	Rating
AllMusic	link
Pitchfork Media	(6.7/10) link

Immaculate Machine's Fables is the third full-length album by Canadian indie rock band Immaculate Machine. Released on Mint Records on June 12, 2007, the album was available for sale on iTunes as of May 29.

== Track listing ==
1. "Jarhand" – 3:27
2. "Dear Confessor" – 3:01
3. "Roman Statues" – 4:05
4. "Old Flame" – 4:32
5. "Small Talk" – 3:42
6. "Nothing Ever Happens" – 2:43
7. "Northeastern Wind" – 4:31
8. "C'Mon Sea Legs" – 4:02
9. "Pocket" – 2:29
10. "Blinding Light" – 3:42

== Personnel ==
- Kathryn Calder – keyboards, vocals
- Brooke Gallupe – guitar, vocals
- Luke Kozlowski – drums, vocals
- John Collins – percussion, synthesizer
- Caitlin Gallupe – artwork, background vocals
- Leslie Rewega – background vocals ("Small Talk")
- Owen Pallett – violin
- Michael Olsen – cello
- Olivia Meek – musical saw ("C'mon Sea Legs")
