= Infinite Light =

Studio album by Lightning Dust
- Released: August 4, 2009
- Genre: Indie rock; experimental pop
- Length: 35:03
- Label: Jagjaguwar

Lightning Dust chronology
| Lightning Dust (2007) | Infinite Light (2009) | Fantasy (2013) |

Infinite Light is the second album by Canadian indie rock band Lightning Dust, released August 4, 2009 on Jagjaguwar.

== Composition ==
Compared to the group's eponymous debut album, Infinite Light takes the group in an experimental pop direction; it is gentler and smoother, mixing electronic drum beats, synthesizers, reverb effects and lush string arrangements. According to one reviewer, the classical strings and downbeat piano combine with Amber Webber's "tender yet confrontational voice" for a theatrical feel. The album is eclectic, comprising stringed ballads, psychedelic folk, downbeat 'dirges' and mid-tempo songs held together by roomy drums and eerie keyboards. "The Time" is a rockabilly song with tabla, while "Antonia Jane" has drawn comparison to Arcade Fire.

== Critical reception ==
Professional ratings
Aggregate scores
| Source | Rating |
|---|---|
| Metacritic | 76/100 |
Review scores
| Source | Rating |
| AllMusic | 4/5 stars |
| Clash | 7/10 |
| Drowned in Sound | 8/10 |
| Pitchfork | 8/10 |
| PopMatters | 7/10 |
| Spin | 3.5/5 stars |
| Under The Radar | 8/10 |

At Metacritic, which assigns a normalised rating out of 100 to reviews from mainstream critics, Infinite Light has an average score of 76, based on 13 reviews, which indicates "generally favorable reviews". Margaret Reges of AllMusic praised Webber's "haunted" singing, comparing her to "Chan Marshall with a Gatling-gun vibrato" and writing that her voice perfectly complements the band's "theatrical, darkly glimmering compositions." Clash reviewer Stephen Maughan considers it a "rewarding album" with a timeless appeal, as it is "something worth visiting through the good times, and bad." For PopMatters, Anthony Lombardi considered the album a "refreshing follow-up" to Lightning Dust and writes that although it is not groundbreaking, it builds upon the group's output.

Amy Granzin of Pitchfork considers the album's "overall quality" to partly be for its short length, and noted how the songs begin with standard pop structures before expanding into "inventive, genre-exploding arrangements", noting an eclectic array of influences including krautrock, piano singer-songwriters, girl groups and Fleetwood Mac. Rob Wohl of Spin described how the grand piano and retro synths underpin "a mess of ideas", but praised the epic ballads "Never Seen" and "Waiting on the Sun to Rise", which he likened to Bat for Lashes. Under the Radar reviewer J. Pace drew comparison with Lightning Dust's sister band Black Mountain, writing that both exist "somewhat outside of historical context" and favouring "an audible '70s bias". However, they added that "if Black Mountain indulges the riff, Lightning Dust indulges the song." A reviewer for Alternative Press considered the album to reveal how Lightning Dust have "stepped away from Black Mountain's shadow".

== Track listing ==
| No. | Title | Length |
|---|---|---|
| 1. | "Antonia Jane" | 3:06 |
| 2. | "I Knew" | 2:31 |
| 3. | "Dreamer" | 3:46 |
| 4. | "The Times" | 2:17 |
| 5. | "Never Seen" | 4:57 |
| 6. | "History" | 2:48 |
| 7. | "Honest Man" | 2:22 |
| 8. | "Waiting on the Sun to Rise" | 4:03 |
| 9. | "Wondering What Everyone Knows (Budgie Cover)" | 3:09 |
| 10. | "Take It Home" | 6:04 |
