= Naomi (album) =

Studio album by The Cave Singers
- Released: March 5, 2013
- Recorded: Seattle
- Genres: Indie rock Indie folk
- Length: 48:37
- Label: Jagjaguwar
- Producer: Phil Ek

The Cave Singers chronology
No Witch (2011)	Naomi (2013)	Banshee (2016)

Professional ratings
Aggregate scores
Source	Rating
Metacritic	68/100
Review scores
Source	Rating
musicOMH	4/5 stars
Paste Magazine	(8/10)
PopMatters	(7/10)

Naomi is the fourth studio album by American band The Cave Singers. It was released in March 2013 on Jagjaguwar.

== Track listing ==
No.	Title	Length
1.	"Canopy"	4:29
2.	"Have to Pretend"	3:31
3.	"No Tomorrows"	3:51
4.	"It's a Crime"	4:22
5.	"Week to Week"	4:04
6.	"Evergreens"	2:54
7.	"Shine"	5:23
8.	"Karen's Car"	2:42
9.	"Easy Way"	3:29
10.	"Northern Lights"	5:42
11.	"Early Moon"	3:44
12.	"When the World"	4:26

== Personnel ==
- Pete Quirk – vocals, guitar, melodica, harmonica
- Derek Fudesco – guitar, bass pedals
- Marty Lund – drums, guitar
- Hanna Benn - backing vocals (track 2)
- Phil Ek - producer, engineer, mixing
- Johnny Mendoza - assistant engineer for basic tracking
- Sean Lane - drum tech
- Clayton Merrell - cover
