= Tariq Hussain (musician) =

Canadian singer-songwriter

- Born: Cowansville, Quebec, Canada
- Occupation: Singer-songwriter
- Years active: 1993–present
- Label: EMI
- Website: www.tariqmusiq.com

Tariq Hussain, frequently billed as Tariq, is a Canadian singer-songwriter based in Vancouver, British Columbia.

He was born in Cowansville, Quebec. His father, a Pakistani immigrant, was very concerned about his children getting a good education and it was only in his mid-teens, after his father had died, that Hussain began playing the guitar. At Bishop's University, he studied theatre arts. He began devoting most of his time to a music career upon moving to Calgary, Alberta, in 1995, releasing his first album, Splat, independently that year.

In 1997, he was signed to EMI Music Canada. His album The Basement Songs was produced by Steven Drake of Odds and won critical acclaim, with music writers citing the maturity of the folk-rock songwriting, as the songs addressed issues of racism and religion. His best-known song, "Chevrolet Way", was a Canadian radio hit in 1997 and garnered him a Juno Award nomination for Best New Solo Artist at the Juno Awards of 1998. His subsequent independent release, While You're Down There, included collaborations with Jules Shear and with Charlotte Caffey of the Go-Go's.

In addition to his solo recordings, he has been a collaborating member of Brasstronaut, and a host on CBC Music and CBC Radio 3.

In 2011, Hussain won the Maxine Sevack Award for Creative Nonfiction from the University of British Columbia, as well as receiving his master's degree in creative writing from the institution. He currently teaches courses in the Faculty of Arts there, mainly focusing on creative and lyric writing.

== Discography ==
- Graffiti Artist (1993)
- Splat (1995)
- The Basement Songs (1997)
- While You're Down There (2001)
- Goodbye Lonely (2005)
- Moonwalker EP (2013)
- Telegrams (2019)
- Scroll Before You Sleep (2025)
