= Kill Matilda =

Canadian female-fronted, four-piece rock/punk/metal musical group

- Origin: Vancouver, British Columbia, Canada
- Genres: Rock, metal
- Years active: 2007–present
- Members: Dusty Exner; Mykel Exner
- Past members: Marlene Loud, Pynner, Nate Pole, Geo Costello, Kyla Rockingham, Marla McQueen, Dave Roberts, Mitchell Schols, Marcus Luk
- Website: killmatilda.com

Kill Matilda is a Canadian female-fronted, four-piece rock/punk/metal musical group formed in 2009 in Vancouver, British Columbia. The group was recognized for its unique, loud and energetic live stage performances and an ability to engage with fans during live shows. The band has established themselves through their use of horror punk imagery and zombie-related themes

Kill Matilda is fronted by Dusty Exner. Exner's singing and screaming were noted in reviews and her personality was described as "enchanting", akin to a "punky snarl", and "like Joan Jett on steroids".

Exner, originally of Burns Lake and Prince George, is also noted for extreme stage behaviour (sporadic), a love of beer (the singer is reported to have offered beer to fans prior to Kill Matilda shows), and a frequent use of profanity during live shows.

== Band history ==
=== Early years (2006–2008) ===
Exner moved from her hometown of Prince George to Vancouver in 2005 and formed an all-girl project featuring Marlene Lau on guitar, Kyla Rockingham on drums, and Marla McQueen on bass. The lineup went through several changes until Exner's boyfriend at the time, Mykel Exner, became the full-time bass player.

=== Self-titled EP and early touring ===
The band replaced drummer Nate Pole with Marcus Luk and officially released their first self-titled EP and music video for the single "She's A Killer" in 2009. The band embarked on their first western Canadian tour in mid-2009. In 2010, the band toured cross-Canada and relocated to Montreal, Quebec. "She's A Killer" was entered into light rotation on the MuchLoud channel.

=== Songs of Survival and "Zombie Apocalypse USA" tour ===
Between 2011 and 2014, Kill Matilda released the Zombie Apocalypse album (2011) and later re-released 5 songs from the same album plus a bonus acoustic version of the track "Geisha with a Switchblade" in 2014 and released the tracks as the #PUNK#ZOMBIE#ROCKNROLL album. After taking time off in 2011 so that bass player Mykel Exner could recover from surgery for a rare carotid-body tumor known as a paraganglioma, the band recorded a 6-song EP with producer Garth Richardson and toured across Canada, resettling in Toronto, Ontario.

In late 2014, the band undertook their first US tour and largest tour to date, consisting of six continuous months of touring the US, Canada, and Mexico. In order to finance the tour the band ran a successful indiegogo campaign. The band remained in the US until early 2015 and released Songs of Survival in August 2015 on Little Heart Records. After only seven months off the road, with the exception of the short Tabarnak & Back tour) the band began their Punk Survival North American tour in support of the Songs of Survival album.

Songs of Survival was well received in the underground punk media, with reviews calling the album "aggressive pop punk", "powerful and focused" and "leav(es) you wanting more".

In December 2015, the band parted ways with drummer Luk and the tour was cancelled, though Exner & Exner played some January 2016 dates with fill-in drummer Mitchell Schols. Since January 2016 the band has been on hiatus.

=== Personal life ===
Exner is married to Kill Matilda's bass player, Mykel Exner, who is also noted for his "exaggerated mannerisms" and boisterous personality on-stage. Exner is also a published writer who has had opinion pieces and poems featured in print and online blogs such as Addicted Magazine, Missy Ink, and Discorder Magazine.

Prior to their 2014 cross-Canada Zombie Apocalypse tour, Exner suffered an ectopic pregnancy. The band still managed to fulfill a show obligation at Rent Cheque in Vancouver, British Columbia, one week after her emergency surgery and did not cancel their tour. After Dusty Exner and Mykel Exner struggled to conceive it was announced that Exner was pregnant in July 2016, coinciding with the band's hiatus.

In late 2015, the band donated a portion of the proceeds of online album sales to help a Syrian refugee come to Canada.
