= Ones and Zeros (Immaculate Machine album) =

Studio album by Immaculate Machine
- Released: September 6, 2005
- Genre: Indie rock
- Length: 47:51
- Label: Mint
- Producer: John Collins; David Carswell

Immaculate Machine chronology
| Transporter (2004) | Ones and Zeros (2005) | Les Uns Mais Pas Les Autres (2006) |

Professional ratings
Review scores
| Source | Rating |
|---|---|
| AllMusic | 3.5/5 stars |

Ones and Zeros is the second full-length release by Canadian indie rock group Immaculate Machine. It is their first official release through Mint Records. Music videos were released for the songs "Broken Ship" and "So Cynical". Six of the songs on this album were translated into French and appear on Immaculate Machine's 2006 EP Les Uns Mais Pas Les Autres.

== Track listing ==
All songs by Immaculate Machine.

1. "Broken Ship" – 3:33
2. "No Such Thing as the Future" – 3:06
3. "Fire in the Lobby" – 3:43
4. "Phone No." – 3:38
5. "On/Off" – 2:25
6. "Invention '77" – 4:15
7. "So Cynical" – 3:41
8. "No Way Out" – 4:36
9. "Army" – 3:25
10. "Two Places" – 3:56
11. "Latest Breaking News" – 4:00
12. "Don't Leave Without Us" – 2:33
13. "Statue" – 4:56

== Personnel ==
- Kathryn Calder – keyboards, vocals
- Brooke Gallupe – guitar, vocals
- Luke Kozlowski – drums, vocals
- Caitlin Gallupe – artwork
- Randy Iwata – additional layout
- Silas Pronk – original cover photo
