= Nicholas Krgovich =

Canadian musician

Nicholas Krgovich (born 1982), also sometimes credited as Nick Krgovich, is a Canadian musician from Vancouver, British Columbia. He is most noted for the 2020 album Philadelphia, a collaboration with Joseph Shabason and Chris Harris which was a longlisted nominee for the 2021 Polaris Music Prize.

Krgovich was active in the early 2000s as a member of the indie pop bands P:ano, Gigi and No Kids, and as a collaborator with Veda Hille, Rose Melberg and Mount Eerie. He released his solo debut album, Who Cares? In 2013, and followed up with further solo albums in the 2010s and 2020s. His 2018 album "Ouch" was about his breakup with his first boyfriend, and marked the first time he actively wrote and sang about gay themes in his music.

In 2021, he released This Spring, an album of Hille covers, and he, Shabason and Harris released the instrumental album Florence as a companion piece to Philadelphia.

In 2022, Krgovich and Shabason announced another collaborative album, At Scaramouche.

== Discography ==
- Who Cares? (2013)
- On Sunset (2014)
- On Cahuenga (2015)
- The Hills (2016)
- In an Open Field (2017)
- "Ouch" (2018)
- Philadelphia (2020, as Shabason, Krgovich & Harris)
- This Spring (2021)
- Florence (2021, as Shabason, Krgovich & Harris)
- At Scaramouche (2022, as Shabason & Krgovich)
- Ducks (2023)
