= Way to Go, Einstein =

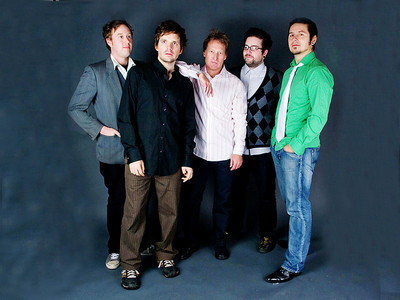
- Way to Go, Einstein in 2009

Background information
- Origin: Vancouver, British Columbia, Canada
- Genres: Indie rock
- Years active: 2006–2010
- Labels: Submerged
- Past members: Andrew Carter; Kevin Jack; Geoffrey Nilson; Benson Musaev; Michael Munro
- Website: soundcloud.com/waytogoeinstein

Way to Go, Einstein was a Canadian five-piece indie rock music group formed in 2006 in Vancouver, British Columbia. Their second LP, Pseudonym, was released on March 17, 2009 by Submerged Records. It was recorded over a period of eight months at the band's studios in New Westminster, Burnaby, and at The Hive Creative Labs with Colin Stewart. Pseudonym was featured on the college radio top fifty charts in many cities across Canada. The band, originally composed of members Andrew (Vocals) and Kevin (Guitar), completed its line-up in early 2007. Each member comes from his own separate musical background, making for an eclectic mix of ambient and at times heavy guitars, melodic vocals and piano, synthesizers, hypnotic bass lines, and creative rhythms. Way to Go, Einstein's first album Hide and Seek Champion was released in 2007 by Broken Oak Records. The first single, "Walk Through Fire", created some initial buzz for the band in the Vancouver area. Way to Go, Einstein disbanded peacefully in 2010 after several months of stagnation. Members Geoffrey and Kevin later formed synth-pop duo Fathoms in 2012. Benson Musaev went on to a career as a sculptor for make up and special effects in film and television.

== Members ==
- Andrew Carter: voice/guitar/piano
- Kevin Jack: guitar/synth/moods
- Geoffrey Nilson: guitar/synth/voice/tambourine
- Benson Musaev: bass
- Michael Munro: drums

== Discography ==
- (2007) Hide and Seek Champion
- (2009) Pseudonym
