= Invitation Songs =

Studio album by The Cave Singers
- Released: September 25, 2007
- Recorded: Vancouver
- Genre: Indie rock, indie folk
- Label: Matador Records
- Producer: Colin Stewart

The Cave Singers chronology
Invitation Songs (2007)	Welcome Joy (2009)

Professional ratings
Review scores
Source	Rating
AllMusic	4/5 stars
Pitchfork Media	6.8/10
PopMatters	7/10 stars

Invitation Songs is The Cave Singers' debut album. It was recorded in Vancouver and released on September 25, 2007, on Matador Records.

== Track listing ==
All songs written by Derek Fudesco.

1. "Seeds of Night" – 4:59
2. "Helen" – 3:48
3. "Dancing On Our Graves" – 3:24
4. "Cold Eye" – 3:26
5. "Royal Lawns" – 3:08
6. "Elephant Clouds" – 4:01
7. "New Monuments" – 3:52
8. "Oh Christine" – 3:53
9. "Bricks Of Our Home" – 3:36
10. "Called" – 3:37

=== Videos ===
- "Dancing On Our Graves"

== Personnel ==
- Pete Quirk – vocals, guitar, melodica, harmonica
- Derek Fudesco – guitar, bass pedals
- Marty Lund – drums, guitar
