= Fantasy (Lightning Dust album) =

Studio album by Lightning Dust
- Released: June 25, 2013
- Genre: Indie rock, electronic rock
- Length: 39:26
- Label: Jagjaguwar

Lightning Dust chronology
Infinite Light (2009)	Fantasy (2013)

Professional ratings
Aggregate scores
Source	Rating
Metacritic	70/100
Review scores
Source	Rating
Allmusic	4/5 stars
Consequence of Sound	3.5/5 stars
MusicOMH	3.5/5 stars
Slant Magazine	4/5 stars

Fantasy is the third studio album by Canadian indie-rock duo Lightning Dust. It was released in June 2013 under Jagjaguwar Records.

Lightning Dust released the music video for their first single "Diamond" in May 2013

== Track list ==
No.	Title	Length
1.	"Diamond"	3:33
2.	"Reckless and Wild"	3:54
3.	"Mirror"	3:45
4.	"Moon"	3:14
5.	"Fire Me Up"	4:19
6.	"Loaded Gun"	4:02
7.	"In the City Tonight"	5:02
8.	"Fire, Flesh and Bone"	4:21
9.	"Agatha"	4:10
10.	"Never Again"	3:06
