= P:ano =

Canadian indie pop band

p:ano
- Origin: Vancouver, British Columbia, Canada
- Genres: Indie pop
- Years active: 1999–2008, 2023–present
- Labels: Hi Fi, Zum, Electricity, Mint
- Spinoffs: No Kids
- Members: Julia Chirka; Justin Kellam; Nick Krgovich; Larissa Loyva

P:ano is a Canadian indie pop band from Vancouver, British Columbia. Their early music was typically labelled as chamber pop, but with their third album Brigadoon they began to evolve a much more diverse style that drew on influences from throughout pop music history.

Active from 1999 to 2008, and 2023–present, the band consists of Larissa Loyva, Justin Kellam, Julia Chirka and Nick Krgovich. In 2023, they reformed to play a concert of new material and recorded a new album, due out in the fall of 2024.

== History ==
Nick Krgovich and Larissa Loyva started playing together in 1999, and were later joined by Justin Kellam and Julia Chirka to form a foursome. Their debut release, When It's Dark and It's Summer, was recorded at and co-released by Hive Studios.

The band worked with many prominent Vancouver musicians including Veda Hille, Ida Nilsen, Torston Muller and members of The Beans, Black Mountain, Jerk With a Bomb, Gaze, and Standing Wave.

Their second album, The Den, was recorded over five months in 2003 by Colin Stewart (Destroyer, Hot Hot Heat, Radio Berlin) at The Western Front and The Hive studios. Arranged with keyboards, horns, strings and back-up vocals, the quartet's orchestral lo-fi pop is reminiscent of Rufus Wainwright.

P:ano's third album, Brigadoon, was released in April 2005. The album appeared on the !earshot Top 200 chart that June. Their fourth album, Ghost Pirates Without Heads, followed that October.

P:ano called it quits when Larissa Loyva departed. The remaining three formed No Kids in 2008. Other side projects include Burquitlam Plaza, Duplex!, BORING, Gigi, and To Bad Catholics.

== Discography ==
- When it's Dark and it's summer (Hive Fi Records/Zum Records, 2001)
- The Den (Hive Fi Records/Zum Records, 2002)
- Storm the Gates / Pure Evil 7" (Electricity Records, 2003)
- Brigadoon (Mint Records, 2005)
- Ghost Pirates Without Heads (Mint Records, 2005)
- ba ba ba (C.O.Q. Records, 2024)

== See also ==
- List of bands from British Columbia
- List of bands from Canada
