= Les Uns Mais Pas Les Autres =

EP by Immaculate Machine
- Released: 2006
- Recorded: 2006
- Genre: Indie rock
- Length: 22:10
- Label: Mint Records
- Producer: John Collins; David Carswell

Immaculate Machine chronology
Ones and Zeros (2005)	Les Uns Mais Pas Les Autres (2006)	Immaculate Machine's Fables (2007)

Professional ratings
Review scores
Source	Rating
AllMusic	3/5 stars

Les Uns Mais Pas Les Autres is the fourth release by Canadian indie pop group Immaculate Machine. It includes six French translations of songs from their 2005 full-length album Ones and Zeros.

== Track listing ==
1. "Numéro de téléphone" – 3:40 ("Phone Number")
2. "Bateau brisé" – 3:35 ("Broken Ship")
3. "(Comme tu es) Cynique" – 3:42 ("So Cynical")
4. "Sans issue" – 4:37 ("No Way Out")
5. "Les Dernières nouvelles" – 4:02 ("Latest Breaking News")
6. "Ne pars pas sans nous" – 2:34 ("Don't Leave Without Us")

== Personnel ==
- Kathryn Calder – keyboards, vocals
- Brooke Gallupe – guitar, vocals
- Luke Kozlowski – drums, vocals
- Caitlin Gallupe – artwork
