= Ladyhawke =

Ladyhawke may refer to:

- Ladyhawke (musician) (born 1979), New Zealand singer-songwriter
  - Ladyhawke (album), her 2008 studio album
- Ladyhawke (film), a 1985 film starring Matthew Broderick, Rutger Hauer and Michelle Pfeiffer
  - Ladyhawke (novel), a 1985 novelization of the film by Joan D. Vinge

== See also ==
- Ladyhawk (disambiguation)
