= Shots (Ladyhawk album) =

Studio album by Ladyhawk
- Released: March 4, 2008
- Genre: Indie rock
- Length: 39:12
- Label: Jagjaguwar

Ladyhawk chronology
Ladyhawk (2006)	Shots (2008)

Professional ratings
Review scores
Source	Rating
AllMusic	3/5 stars
Pitchfork	(6.2/10)

Shots is the second full-length album by Vancouver indie rock band Ladyhawk. It was released on Jagjaguwar on March 4, 2008 in North America, and on April 7, 2008 in the UK.

== Track listing ==
All tracks written by Duffy Driediger/Darcy Hancock/Sean Hawryluk/Ryan Peters.

1. "I Don't Always Know What You're Saying" – 4:17
2. "S.T.H.D." – 1:58
3. "Fear" – 4:16
4. "Corpse Paint" – 4:17
5. "(I'll Be Your) Ashtray" – 4:13
6. "Faces Of Death" – 4:46
7. "Night You're Beautiful" – 3:03
8. "You Ran" – 1:50
9. "Ghost Blues" – 10:35
10. "Crows Commute (Bonus Track)" - 3:04
