= Hinterland (band) =

- Origin: Vancouver, British Columbia, Canada
- Genres: Indie pop, dream pop, shoegazing, new wave revival
- Years active: 2002–2008
- Labels: Submerged Records
- Past members: John Bews; Kyle Fogden; Cameron McLellan
- Website: Hinterland

Hinterland is a Canadian indie pop band from Vancouver. Hinterland's music is best described as dream pop/shoegazing/new wave with soaring, ethereal vocals, and is currently released by Submerged Records. Hinterland's second album The Picture Plane (released February 2006) spent three months in the Canadian college radio top 50. Hinterland's debut album Under the Waterline won the band several Georgia Straight Music Awards, including best local album, best vocalist, and most underrated band. Hinterland has been featured on MuchMusic and CBC Television's ZeD.

Hinterland has shared the stage with artists such as Monade, the Album Leaf, Brendan Benson, Silversun Pickups, The Hermit, Paper Moon, and A Northern Chorus, and has performed across Canada, hitting cities such as Victoria, Calgary, Edmonton, Regina, Winnipeg, and Toronto.

Two of the members who wrote and performed on Under the Waterline and The Picture Plane are no longer with the band. Kyle Fogden left before the latter album was released, to be replaced by Greg Williams. Cameron McLellan left the band in the summer of 2006; his spot was filled by Robb Johannes.

Hinterland's third album Pan Pan Medico was released in February 2008.

In 2008, Hinterland members John Lucas and Michaela Galloway started a new project called The Hope Slide. The duo released a self-titled album in 2010, and are currently working on an album to be released in 2014.

== Members ==
- Michaela Galloway: vocals, flute, oboe, keys, percussion
- Robb Johannes: bass, guitar
- John Lucas: guitar, baritone guitar, bass
- Gregg Steffensen: drums, percussion, noise
- Greg Williams: guitar, keys

== Former members ==
- John Bews: bass
- Kyle Fogden: guitar, keyboards, bass
- Cameron McLellan: bass, guitar

== Discography ==
- (2003) masstransfer issue 6 - Magazine with compilation CD featuring the song "Tiger Tiger"
- (2003) Under the Waterline
- (2005) Never Lose That Feeling - Compilation featuring Hinterland cover of Lush's "For Love"
- (2006) The Picture Plane
- (2006) One Cool Word issue 2 - Magazine with compilation CD featuring the song "Exit Signs"
- (2008) Pan Pan Medico
