= The Cave Singers =

American indie band

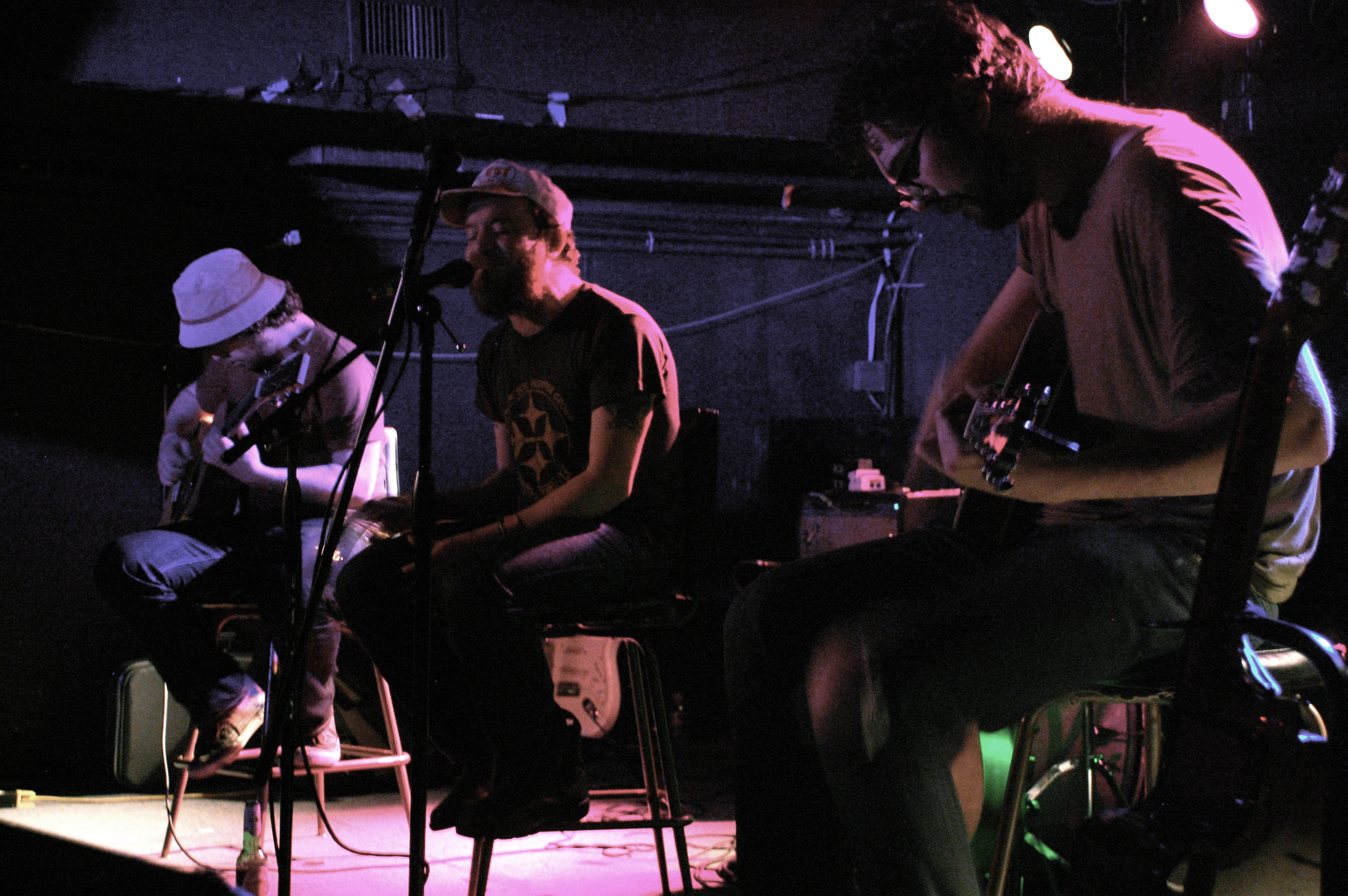
- The Cave Singers performing at the Rock & Roll Hotel in Washington, DC, May 2008

Background information
- Origin: Seattle, Washington, U.S.
- Genres: Indie rock Indie folk
- Instruments: Vocals, guitars, melodica, harmonica, bass pedals, drums
- Years active: 2007 – present
- Labels: Jagjaguwar; Matador
- Spinoff of: Pretty Girls Make Gravesgh
- Members: Pete Quirk; Derek Fudesco; Marty Lund; Morgan Henderson
- Website: Official Site; Official MySpace page

The Cave Singers is an American band from Seattle. Composed of former members of Pretty Girls Make Graves (PGMG) after its disbandment in 2007, former PGMG member Derek Fudesco teamed up with Pete Quirk (of Hint Hint) and Marty Lund (of Cobra High) and began playing in the Seattle area. Soon after the band's conception, The Cave Singers signed with Matador Records on June 11, 2007. The band spent time recording in Vancouver with music engineer Colin Stewart, who quickly produced the band's first full-length LP. The band released the limited-edition single 7-inch "Seeds Of Night" including the B-side, "After The First Baptism" on August 2, 2007. Invitation Songs, the first LP, was released on September 25, 2007, to critical acclaim. The second single, "Dancing On Our Graves", came out on February 25, 2008.

On August 18, 2009, The Cave Singers released their second album, Welcome Joy, featuring guest appearances from Amber and Ashley Webber of Lightning Dust, a Canadian band. Matador Records gave away a free download of the track "Beach House" to fans.

The Cave Singers signed to Jagjaguwar on June 15, 2010. The label released a third LP, No Witch, on February 22, 2011.

== Personnel ==
- Pete Quirk – vocals, guitar, melodica, harmonica
- Derek Fudesco – guitar, bass pedals
- Marty Lund – drums, guitar
- Morgan Henderson – bass, flute

== Discography ==
=== Albums ===
- Invitation Songs - Matador Records (2007)
- Welcome Joy - Matador (2009)
- No Witch - Jagjaguwar (2011)
- Naomi - Jagjaguwar (2013)
- Banshee - Self-released (2016)

=== Singles ===
- "Seeds of Night" - Matador (2007)
- "Dancing on Our Graves" - Matador (2008)
- "Swim Club" - Jagjaguwar (2011)
