= CITR-FM =

Radio station at the University of British Columbia in Vancouver

Coordinates: 49°15′59.612″N 123°14′59.242″W

CiTR
- Vancouver, British Columbia; Canada
- Broadcast area: Greater Vancouver
- Frequency: 101.9 MHz
- Branding: CiTR and Discorder

Programming
- Format: Public radio/AAA

Ownership
- Owner: Student Radio Society of the University of British Columbia

History
- First air date: April 1, 1989

Technical information
- Licensing authority: CRTC
- Class: A
- ERP: 390 watts (1,800 watts maximum)
- HAAT: 103 metres (338 ft)

Links
- Webcast: Listen Live player; AAC stream; mp3 stream
- Website: citr.ca

CITR-FM (101.9 FM) is a non-commercial radio station in Vancouver, British Columbia, Canada. It is owned by the Student Radio Society of the University of British Columbia, with studios in the Alma Mater Society Student Nest in the Point Grey campus lands, just west of the city limits of Vancouver. It airs talk radio and a variety of music genres, including jazz, indie, rock music, and noise.

CiTR-FM has an effective radiated power (ERP) of 390 watts (1,800 watts maximum). Its transmitter is located on campus. Its signal encompasses most of the Vancouver Metropolitan Area.

CiTR-FM is operated by UBC students and community volunteers under the ownership of the Student Radio Society of the University of British Columbia, an entity closely affiliated with UBC's AMS. The station's mandate is to provide programming that is alternative to the genres played on mainstream radio.

CiTR-FM is a member of the National Campus and Community Radio Association, and hosted the National Campus and Community Radio Conference in 1984 and again in 2007. The NCRC is an annual national gathering of community-oriented radio broadcasters who provide alternative radio to a diverse audience. It has been offered every summer since 1981, and it is one of the core activities of the NCRA/ANREC.

== History ==
=== Early years ===
The Class A station signed on the air on April 1, 1989, but the university had been involved in radio since the 1930s. In 1937, Ozzie Durkin, Dorwin Baird, Victor Freeman, and Malcolm Brown began a variety show called "Varsity Time" on CJOR. Then, in 1938 UBC Radio became an official club on campus. In 1942, UBC Radio became RADSOC and continued to produce radio programming for CJOR, CKWX-AM, CBR, and CKMO. By 1947, UBC Radio had earned a place in the new facilities in UBC's Brock Hall.

In 1949, the budding radio coming out of RADSOC was put on hold after overspending and a bungled radio talent show. The members of RADSOC returned to their station in the fall to discover the doors locked. President Don Cunliffe reinstated RADSOC with no budget and the society continued to broadcast one hour daily despite their financial hardship. A resilient RADSOC partnered with CKWX (BC Association of Broadcasters) to operate a twenty-two-week-long school for commercial radio. Closed-circuit broadcasts to residences begin, and the first full commercials are run on UBC Radio.

Nearly twenty years later, in 1969, RADSOC moved into state of the art broadcasting facilities in the newly completed Student Union Building (now the Old SUB) and officially becomes CYVR. True to spirit, CYVR was shut down by the UBC Alma Mater Society for six months for operating without a licence. CYVR had applied for a licence in compliance with CRTC regulations, but continued to broadcast before the licence was approved. When the licence was approved, UBC Radio became Thunderbird Radio: CiTR. Then, in 1975, CiTR began broadcasting at 101.9 MHz.

By 1981, CiTR had become an AMS service organization and began to work with the community both on and off campus for the first time since the 1940s. CiTR joined the National Campus Radio Organization, which later became the NCRA. From this affiliation, CiTR was able to make connections with University of Alberta Radio and reform the Western Association of Broadcasters, a Western Canadian campus support and information group that had disbanded twenty years earlier.

=== Low power FM ===
On April 1, 1982, CiTR broadcast for the first time at 101.9 FM after receiving approval from the CTRC for a Low Power FM licence the previous September. The first song played was "Dancing in the Streets" by Martha Reeves and the Vandellas. Discorder hit the streets in 1983.

In 1985, CiTR proposed a unique licensing plan using a directional radio antenna to allow the use of 101.9 MHz simultaneously in Vancouver and Victoria. In that same year, Discorder was chosen by Seattle's Rocket Magazine as one of the Top 20 Publications in the World. Subsequently, in 1988, Discorder was a finalist in the Western Canadian Magazine Awards competition for both Magazine of the Year (circulation under 20 000) and Cover of the Year (50th issue cover, March '87).

CiTR increased its power to 1,800 watts in 1989. The first song played was "Have Not Been the Same" by Slow.

1990 saw the beginning of CiTR's historical participation in the Vancouver Hip Hop scene with DJ Soundwar Chapter One, a rap competition that saw entrants come from as far away as LA. In 1995, CiTR would go on to publish Elements, a magazine that focuses on local and international Hip Hop culture: MCs, DJs, Breaking, and Graffiti. Elements is only published until 1996.

In 1993, CiTR began broadcasting news from the BBC World Service. In 1994, CiTR became the first radio station in Vancouver to hit the internet with an email address and gopher site. By 2000 the station was live broadcasting on the web in concert with the broadcast at 101.9 FM. In 2001, the CRTC mandated an incorporation of French and third language programming on the CiTR airwaves. This move towards diversifying content continued through to the following decade. The station began broadcasting content produced by the newly formed Women's Collective, Indigenous Collective, and Accessibility Collective which joined the standard News, Arts, and Sports Collectives on the air in 2014.

CiTR launched a podcast service in September 2006, allowing listeners to access past shows online.

=== Past personalities ===
Notable or long-running programmers include Nardwuar the Human Serviette, Steve Edge, Gavin Walker of the Jazz Show, "Long" John Tanner, DJ Ebony, DJ Avi Shack, Val Cormier, Luke Meat, Chris-a-riffic, Ska-T, Zena Sharman, Tod Maffin, Bryce Dunn, Jonathon Brown, Spike Chilton of the Northern Wish and the Canadian Way, Bleek Swinney of Exquisite Corpse and Breakfast With The Browns, Pyra Draculea of the Vampire's Ball, Marie Benard of Synchronicity, and Caroline of Sexy In VanCity.

=== Discorder magazine ===
Discorder was created in February 1983 by founding editors Jennifer Fahrni and Mike Mines as an alternative music magazine for Vancouver and the program guide for CiTR. With a circulation of 25,000, the first issue included an interview with Stan Ridgeway of Wall of Voodoo by Mark Mushet; article Youth Culture in West Berlin by Werner Janke; reviews of albums by The Scissors, Los Popularos, and Modernettes by Gord Badanic, Siouxsie and the Banshees, Wall of Voodoo, and Mission of Burma by Dave McDonagh, DOA by Dean Pelkey; and a review of the compilation tape Egghead by Brent Argo. The magazine has since expanded to become a media institution in its own right, running music reviews, book reviews, interviews, essay-length articles, comics, a mixtape, the CiTR program guide, and CiTR's charts.

Discorder also serves as an outlet for emerging Vancouver music writers, photographers, and illustrators.

Issues of Discorder have been digitized by the UBC Library and are available at the UBC Library Open Collections site.

Discorder prints 8,000 copies each month and distributes them across the cities of Vancouver and Victoria.

Discorder's staff rotates on a regular basis. Each editor's personal style is often reflected in stylistic shifts in the magazine's aesthetics and content.

=== Elements ===
Elements was published by CiTR alongside Discorder through 1995 and 1996. The magazine was edited by J Swing and Mr. Flipout and featured crass copy and near perpetual late publication. The magazine reported on, reviewed, and documented Hip Hop music and culture within Vancouver while tying the city's scene to the goings-on of the American Hip Hop phenomenon. Featured artist included KRS-One, Group Home, Ghostface Killah, A Tribe Called Quest, Outkast, and Busta Rhymes.

=== SHiNDiG ===
SHiNDiG is a long-running battle of the bands competition hosted by CiTR yearly from September to December. Past contestants have included bands such as 3 Inches of Blood, Speedbuggy, The Organ, Japandroids, They Shoot Horses, Don't They?, You Say Party! We Say Die!, The Choir Practice, Maow, Collapsing Opposites, Hermética, the Wizerdz, and The Salteens.

=== Sports ===
CiTR provides coverage of the UBC Thunderbirds varsity teams. The sports department produces live coverage of many sporting events during the academic year, such as football, ice hockey, basketball and volleyball. The station has also carried baseball and soccer broadcasts.

CiTR has produced live broadcasts at recent Canadian Interuniversity Sport national tournaments: men's basketball (2009); women's basketball (2004–2008); men's soccer (2007); women's field hockey (2005).

The station won the Arthur W. Delamont Service Award in 1983 and 1987 for their contribution and service to UBC athletics.

=== News ===
CiTR had a news department, which produced News 101, a live, volunteer-produced, student and community newscast. The news department provided original coverage of local, provincial, federal, and international news, from an independent perspective. The news department did not cover crime or other sensationalized news stories, choosing instead to cover politics, social justice and environment topics.

News 101 was formerly broadcast once-weekly, on Fridays at 5pm PST.

CiTR News produced a special series covering the 2010 Olympics in Vancouver, including a special 'Eyes on the Street' segment. CiTR News also produced notable coverage of the APEC protests at UBC in 1997.

=== Archives ===
Archives of 585 recordings of CiTR broadcasts can be found at the University of British Columbia "CiTR Audiotapes" archive. A complete archive of Discorder "from February 1983 to the present, making it the longest running independent music magazine in Vancouver. Issues include articles, reviews, photos, features, interviews and advertisements" can be found at the UBC Library Digitalization Centre
