= Sandalspring =

- Origin: Vancouver, British Columbia, Canada
- Genres: Folk rock
- Years active: 1968—1970
- Members: Robert Anstey; Don Ogilvie; Ken Ogilvie; Sean Byrne; Ken Lerner
- Past members: Jim Fisher; Bruce Anstey; Doug Hicks; Soren Rasmussen

Sandalspring was a Canadian folk rock band that was formed in 1968 and performed extensively at a number of Vancouver clubs until early 1970.

== History ==
Sandalspring traces its roots to 1966 when Robert Anstey formed The Scene with his brother Bruce on guitar, Soren Rasmussen on drums, Doug Hicks on bass, and Jim Fisher on lead vocals. Most of their original material was written by Robert Anstey and Jim Fisher, but the group did play a number of cover songs as well. Jim Fisher was only with the group a short while, and after his departure the group continued until the spring of 1967 when Doug Hicks was replaced by Ken Ogilvie and the band changed its name to Toad.

In the spring of 1968, the band took on a new direction and sound when Don Ogilvie replaced Bruce Anstey as lead guitarist. At that time Robert Anstey changed the band's name to Sandalspring to fit in more with the changing times. In January 1969, Soren Rasmussen left the band and was replaced by Sean Byrne. Ken Lerner was added on saxophone and flute giving the group's sound a distinct jazzy feel.

In 1969, they met Mark Wilson who worked at Bill Lewis Music, a local music and guitar store. He liked their music and often attended their performances, and after a while offered to become their manager. He found them a series of gigs which included La Place, a local teen club where they played a number of shows. During that time, the band auditioned to play at The Big Mother and played on the same stage as Papa Bear's Medicine Show; a performance which received a good review in The Province newspaper and introduced a larger audience to their music.

The band continued to perform regularly at The Big Mother and it was during one of their performances there that they were approached by the owner of The Village Bistro, a well-known club on Fourth Avenue. As this was one of the most popular clubs in Vancouver at that time, Sandalspring eagerly accepted this lucrative opportunity and continued to perform there frequently throughout 1969.

Throughout 1969 and 1970, Sandalspring performed with a number of groups including Mock Duck, Mother Tucker's Yellow Duck, Black Snake Blues Band, Hydro-Electric Streetcar, High Flying Bird, Seeds of Time, Django, Yellow Brique Road, Tomorrow's Eyes, and Gingerbox.

In April 1970, Robert Anstey left the band, citing disappointment with the direction the band had taken musically, and the music industry in general. As the group's only singer and songwriter, and with no one to replace him, the group disbanded, with each member moving on with their own respective musical careers.

== Recordings ==
During the summer of 1969, Sandalspring recorded a series of demos with Robin Spurgin at Vancouver Recording Studios. Although the group broke up shortly thereafter, these recordings - among others - are in the possession of Don Ogilvie, and there is speculation by some that these recordings will be released someday.

== See also ==
- List of bands from British Columbia
- List of bands from Canada
