= Plans and Disguises =

Plans & Disguises
- Also known as: Pardon My Striptease
- Origin: Vancouver, British Columbia, Canada
- Genres: Indie rock Disco grunge
- Years active: 2007–present
- Labels: Northwest Entertainment Group; Polar Bear Records; Fontana North
- Members: Dylan Weightman; Brendan Woodroff
- Past members: Andrew Putt; Adam Coleman; Erron Sweeney
- Website: http://www.pardonmystriptease.com

Plans & Disguises is a Canadian disco-grunge duo from Vancouver, British Columbia. The group formerly performed as Pardon My Striptease and is most known for their single 'Pray (for LJ)' which helped to raise over $100,000 for the BC Children's Hospital Foundation.

== History ==
=== Formation as Pardon My Striptease (2007–2010) ===
The group was originally formed in Chilliwack, British Columbia, under the name Pardon My Striptease in 2007 by Erron Sweeney, Adam Coleman and Dylan Weightman. After auditioning several vocalists Andrew Christopher (Putt) of Agassiz, BC, joined the band in 2009. The group released their first self-titled EP in 2010 recorded at The Factory Studios in Vancouver, published by Polar Bear Records and distributed by Fontana North.

=== Release of Pray (for LJ) (2011) ===
In the Fall of 2011 Andrew's daughter was diagnosed with glioblastoma and that following December the group released the single Pray (for LJ) as a fundraiser for BC Children's Hospital Foundation. The band issued a donation-matching challenge to Canadian rock group Nickelback if 'Pray (for LJ)' surpassed their current single 'We Stand Together' on the iTunes Canada Rock Charts. 'Pray (for LJ)' reached #1 on the iTunes Canada charts on December 8, 2011, and peaked at #20 on the Billboard Canada Hot 100 Singles the week of December 24, 2011.

=== Final show and reunion (2012–2014) ===
Guitarist Erron Sweeney departed in August 2012 and the group played their final show on March 2, 2013, in Harrison Hot Springs, BC Just over one year later the group was reunited to play a cancer benefit in Chilliwack, BC. The show was on April 11, 2014, and in support of a local Ride to Conquer Cancer team.

=== Name change and future (2015–present) ===
On February 26, 2015, the group changed its name to Plans & Disguises which was evidenced on its official website as well as the social media feeds of the remaining band members. The band has announced three self-produced tracks will be released on March 17, 2015. The third track 'Sunrise' features former vocalist Andrew Christopher and all tracks were mixed by Sheldon Zaharko and mastered by Joe LaPorta.

== Members ==
Current

- Brendan Woodroff - vocals, guitar
- Dylan Weightman - vocals, drums

Past

- Andrew Christopher (Putt) - vocals, guitar
- Adam Coleman - vocals, bass guitar
- Erron Sweeney - lead guitar

== Discography ==
=== As 'Pardon My Striptease' ===
Title	Details
Pardon My Striptease EP	Release date: November, 2010; Label: Fontana North/Polar Bear
Pray (for LJ)	Release date: December 5, 2011; Label: Independent
Twenty Strong	Release date: March 2012; Label: Independent

=== Studio albums ===
Title	Details
Ask EP	Release date: March 17, 2015; Label: Independent; Mixing: Sheldon Zaharko; Mastering: Joe LaPorta
