= Welcome Joy =

Studio album by The Cave Singers
- Released: August 18, 2009
- Recorded: 2009
- Genre: Indie folk
- Length: 35:37
- Label: Matador Records

The Cave Singers chronology
Invitation Songs (2007)	Welcome Joy (2009)	No Witch (2011)

Professional ratings
Review scores
Source	Rating
The Independent	3/5 stars
NME	6/10 stars
Rockfeedback	4/5 stars
Spin	4/5 stars
The Stranger	(positive)

Welcome Joy is the second full-length album from Seattle indie folk group The Cave Singers. It was released August 18, 2009, on Matador Records.

== Track listing ==
All tracks are written by The Cave Singers

No.	Title	Length
1.	"Summer Light"	4:07
2.	"Leap"	3:50
3.	"At The Cut"	3:02
4.	"Shrine"	4:40
5.	"Hen Of The Woods"	3:29
6.	"Beach House"	3:43
7.	"VV"	2:57
8.	"I Don't Mind"	3:45
9.	"Townships"	3:09
10.	"Bramble"	2:55

== Personnel ==
- Pete Quirk – vocals, guitar
- Derek Fudesco – guitar, bass
- Marty Lund – drums, guitar
