= The Laundronauts =

Canadian musical group

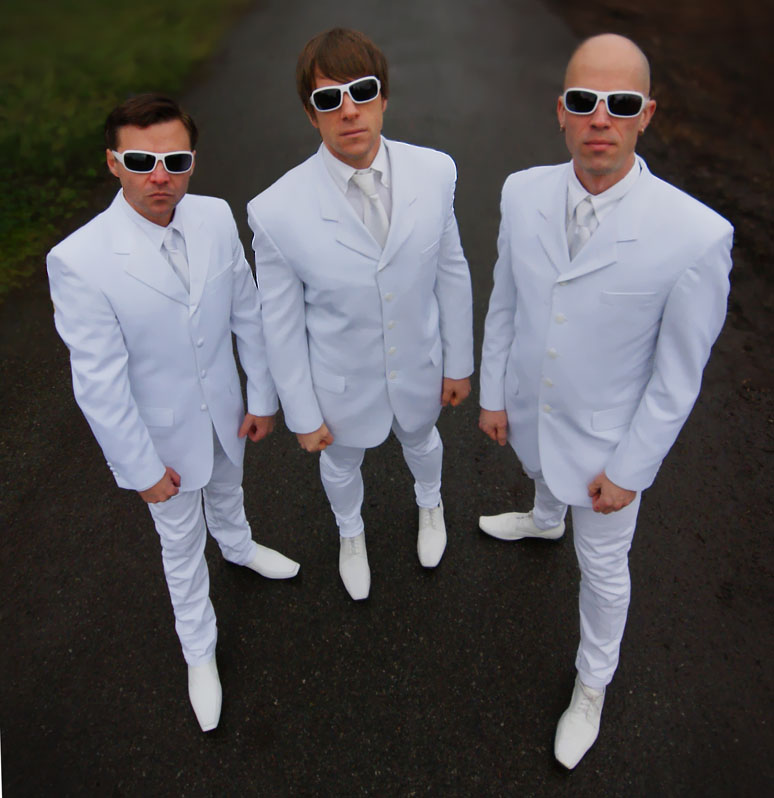
- Laundronauts. From Left: Germán Ebert, Gareth Wynne, Stephen J.

Background information
- Origin: Victoria, British Columbia, Canada
- Genre: Indie rock
- Years active: 2007–present
- Label: Spincycle Records
- Members: Stephen J. Horak; Germán Ebert; Gareth Wynne; Gordon Marshall

The Laundronauts are a Canadian indie rock music trio formed in late 2007 from Victoria, British Columbia. Founded by Stephen J Horak and Gareth Wynne, the Laundronauts release their material on their own label, Spincycle Records.

== Origins and usage of laundronaut ==
The first published use of the term laundronaut comes from a 1963 Cornell University publication describing a new fad. "[A laundronaut is someone who backs] into a coin-operated dryer. After he is in position, his 'crew' deposits a coin in the slot and he begins to revolve in the dryer."

The etymology of laundronaut comes from the two roots: laundry + nautes. Nautes, of Greek origin, refers to a ship or a sailor and is used in English words such as nautilus, nautical, astronaut, and cosmonaut. Laundry, meaning "things to be washed," comes from the French lavare, "to wash." A laundry list, in the figurative sense, arose in 1958 and the term, launder, in the criminal banking sense was introduced in 1961. Using the invented prefix, laundro-, taken from the word laundromat, the Laundronauts have coined several neologisms: laundrock, laundrotainment, and Laundromeda, their mythical home planet.

== History ==
Prior to the formation of the Laundronauts, bassist Wynne and guitarist Horak played in the seven-piece sixties garage-rock band, Captain Cook and the Nootka Sound, which broke up in 1998 and who performed at Fuzz Fest '98 and toured with El Vez. When the band broke up Wynne left Canada for South America in 1998.

In 2007, Wynne reunited with Horak and the two decided to form the Laundronauts. They recruited drummer Gordon Marshall, with whom Wynne played in the Edmonton garage-rock band, the Drastics.

The inspiration for the band name came after learning of the fad from Patrick Sheehy, a laundronaut of the 1960s. The name was chosen as both homage to Sheehy, who had since died, and as a reference to the youthful craze he described.

The Laundronauts played shows throughout North America throughout their career. They were selected as "Band of the Month" by commercial modern rock radio station, The Zone 91.3 FM, receiving regular airplay. Horak's guitar solo for the song Stain was featured in a Vancouver Island Brewery beer commercial starting in November 2009.

MuchMusic began airing the Laundronauts' music video for Stain in December 2009 on The Wedge, the same month that the Laundronauts' album The Laundronauts Come Clean arrived at the number one position on the national campus and community radio report, Earshot. On February 13, 2010, "Come Clean" won Best Original Music at the Vancouver Island Short Film Festival. The award was described as recognition of music that best complemented and enhanced the film experience.

Gareth left the Laundronauts in February 2011, though work continues on the band's second album In Filth, set for release in late 2012.

== Music ==
The idea of using laundry as a metaphor become a creative writing project for Horak and Wynne, influencing the band's style and musical direction. The lyrics appear on the surface to be concerned with laundry, however, "The songs are heavy on double entendres [and] each song is couched in reality: Come Clean is about love while Lint Trap is about lying." Other critics agreed, "With some bands of this ilk, things get gimmicky, but listening to the album, it's just easy to enjoy the rock 'n' roll and have the occasional chuckle at the lyrics."

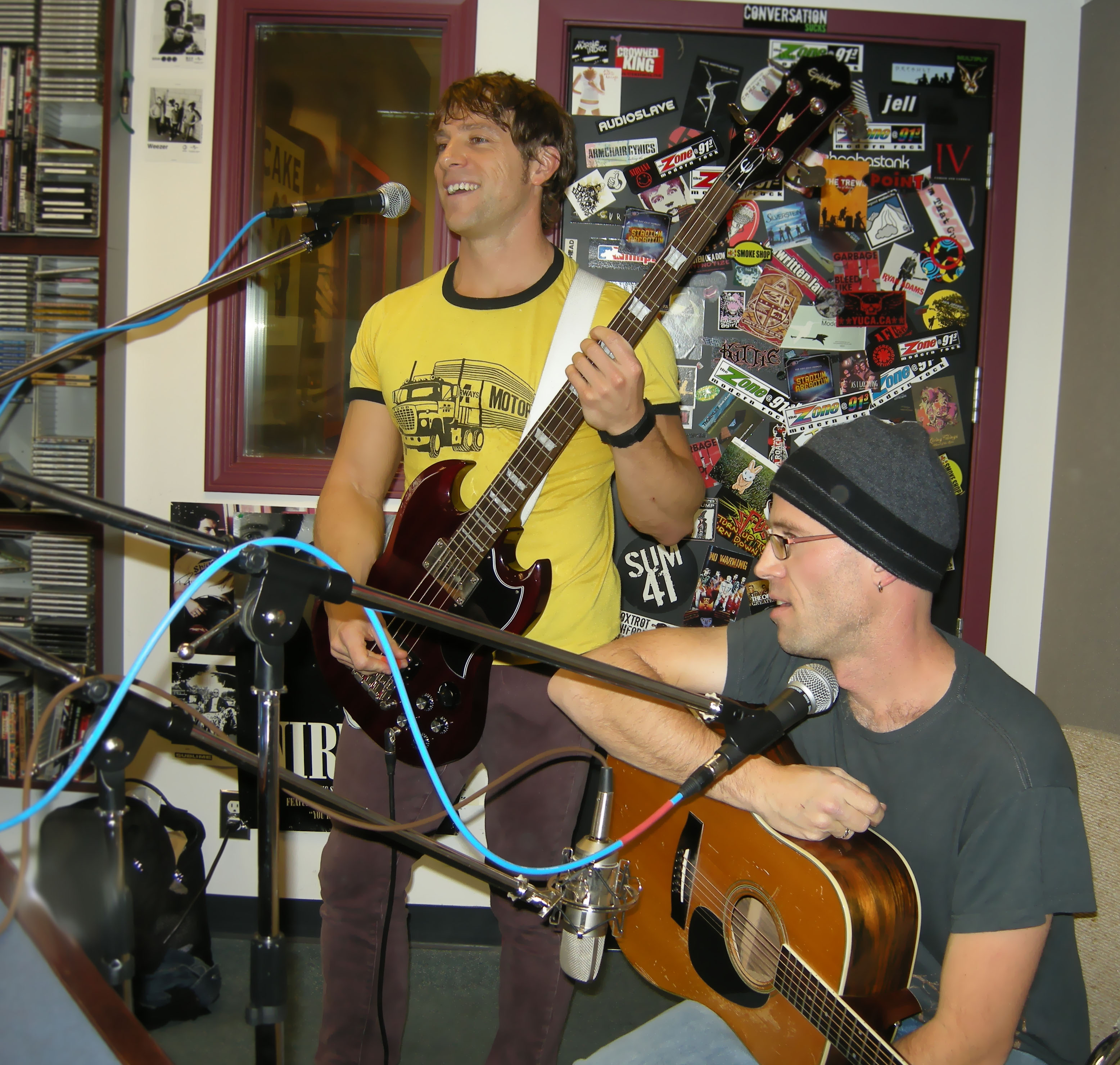
The Laundronauts playing "Come Clean" in The Zone 91.3 FM.

Branding itself as laundrock, a combination of garage-rock, mod, beat, psych, punk, and doo-wop, the Laundronauts sought to create a new sound from what they considered were the best elements of various genres. The Laundronauts' songs seldom run longer than three minutes and the arrangements are designed to be tight and punchy. Vocal harmonies are a key element of the sound and every band member has vocal duties. Horak's guitar effects are also a characteristic element of the Laundronauts' sound. An electronics expert, Horak has created a broad range of sounds through use of upwards of twenty pedals – several of which he created – and multiple amplifiers that make the trio sound more like a five-piece.

== Production ==
After releasing a three-song 45 RPM EP in May 2008, recorded locally, the band decided to look for a studio that would better realize the sound that Horak and Wynne had in mind for the full-length album. They found Detroit producer, Jim Diamond, known for his work with The White Stripes, The Von Bondies, The Romantics and other notables.

"The band's first [album], Come Clean, a fuzz-bomb of bubbly garage rock, was recorded in Detroit with producer and one-time Dirtbombs bassist Jim Diamond (the White Stripes, Mooney Suzuki, Electric Six), a producer of note in the garage-rock revival community."

The Laundronauts chose to work with Diamond in Detroit at his analog studio, Ghetto Recorders, to get the gritty sound they were looking for, "the sound of broken glass, spilled beer, hot rod engines, and burning pork."

== Live performance ==
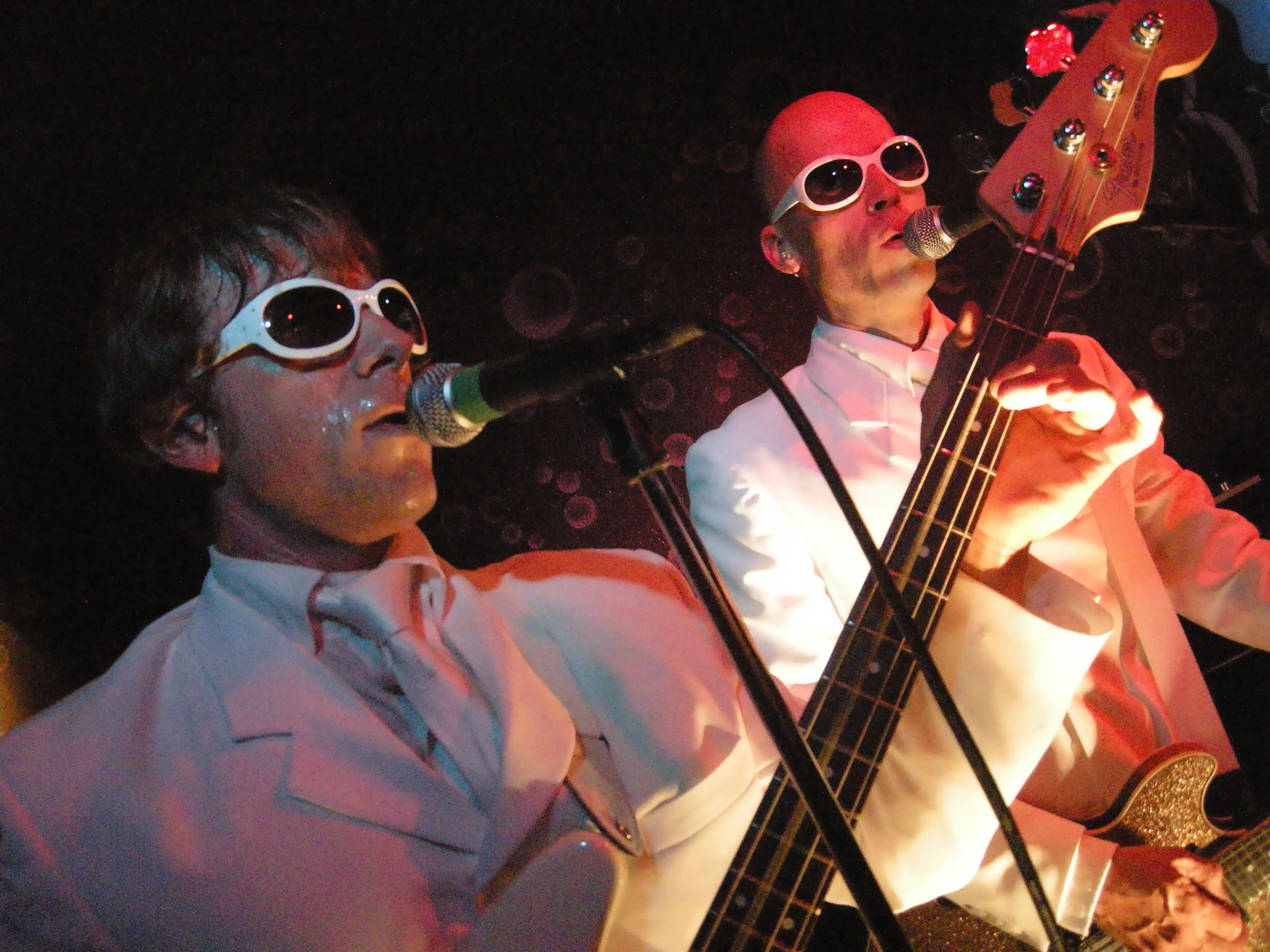
The Laundronauts live at Bar Pink in San Diego.

The Laundronauts' signature look is white-on-white uniforms with white-rimmed sunglasses. Live shows are bathed in blinding white light, smoke, bubbles, strobe effects, and a pneumatic laundry cannon that fires socks, undergarments, and the occasional Laundronauts T-shirt into the audience. All the devices used are custom designed by Stephen J, and triggered onstage as part of the performance.

A critic from a Vancouver monthly music magazine says, "Really, they're a giant washing machine of kick-assery whomping and rattling around the stage, and one wouldn't hesitate to witness their fury live." The Laundronauts have had their live performances highlighted as a tourist attraction in their home town of Victoria, British Columbia.

== Band members ==
Gareth Wynne: bass and lead vocals. Born in Yellowknife, Northwest Territories.

Germán Ebert: drums and backing vocals. Germán was born in Montevideo, Uruguay and grew up in Buenos Aires, Argentina. His musical credits include drumming for Los Barreiro (Buenos Aires, Argentina) and touring as the drummer for the L.A. rockabilly band 3 Bad Jacks. Ebert replaced original drummer Gordon Marshall in December 2009.

Gord Marshall: drums and backing vocals. Originally from Halifax, Gord has drummed for many Canadian independent musical acts, including the Vinaigrettes, the Drastics, and Grrr!. Gord was the original drummer for the Laundronauts and his work is heard on all of the Laundronauts' releases.

Stephen J. Horak: guitar and vocals. Born and raised in Calgary, Alberta. He created the band's pedal-operated laundroscope (capable of filling a venue with bubbles in seconds) and pneumatic laundry cannon featured in the live shows. Horak used upwards of ten guitar pedals during a live show. Horak was also one of the founding members of Bovine Love Jelly, who toured with Sloan in the early 1990s.

== Discography ==
The Laundronauts release their material on CD, digital download formats, and on limited-edition white vinyl (in keeping with the band's theme) with the motto "Spincycle is a-goin' around and around" etched between the run-out grove- a reference to a lyric in Spin Cycle, the first song they wrote as a band.

Hard Water EP, released 2008
1. "Hard Water" (single version)
2. "That Kind of Laundry"
3. "Outta My Head"

According to Bryce Dunn from CITR 101.9 FM, the Laundronauts' Hard Water EP on white vinyl "brims with Sonics-style energy."

Come Clean LP/CD, released 2009
1. "Stain"
2. "Come Clean"
3. "Stop, Drop, Fluff-N-Fold"
4. "Unbalanced Load"
5. "Launder-Annette"
6. "Colourfast Girl"
7. "Slow Dry"
8. "Laundrendezvous"
9. "Spin Cycle"
10. "Lint Trap"
11. "Whirlpool"
12. "Hard Water" (album version)
13. "Agent Detergent"

The album is described as "garage-rock, full of fuzzy guitars, 1950s style backup vocals and dirty bass," and "raucous but focused, especially on those instrumental surf-rock tracks that showcases the band's musical presence, making sure you know they can rock out even without their chosen lyrical theme."

Mike Devlin from CanWest News and the Times Colonist said, "only a dead fish could resist their rambunctious brand of garage punk and mod-infused rock and roll." He goes on to add, "the songs are heavy on double entendres [and] each song is couched in reality: Come Clean is about love, while Lint Trap is about lying."

In Filth LP/CD, released November 2013

1. "Wishy Washy"
2. "Smells Like This"
3. "Between Cycles"
4. "Planet of Mud"
5. "Skid Mark"
6. "Filth"
7. "Mucky Muck"
8. "Shoes In The Dryer"
9. "Yer Laundry"
10. "Sloshy"

== Music videos ==
The 2009 video for the song "Stain", currently in rotation at MuchMusic, features the Laundronauts on board the Laundro1 spaceship in a frenetic reentry into Earth's atmosphere. Calgary director Troy Niemans shot the video on a green screen/stage at one of the movie studios in Calgary's Currie Barracks in the summer of 2009. For the digital effects, Niemans collaborated with Toronto artist Lee James Ormerod.

The video for the song "Come Clean" was chosen for the 2010 Vancouver Island Short Film Festival. The video was a collaboration between the Laundronauts and University of Victoria film students Alina Cerminara, Megan Russell, and Chantal De Brouwer. The film students were tasked with making a music video featuring a local independent band as a term project. The video was shot at Sparkle Bright Launderette in Victoria and the University of Victoria's Finnerty Gardens.

== Influences ==
- The Seeds
- Ohio Express
- The Who
- The Kinks
- The Clash
- The Pixies
- Dead Kennedys
- Fats Waller
- The Flaming Lips

== See also ==
- Music of Canada
- Canadian rock
- List of Canadian musicians
- List of bands from Canada
- List of bands from British Columbia
