= Submerged Records =

- Founded: 2005
- Founder: John Lucas, Michaela Galloway
- Genre: Alternative Music
- Country of origin: Canada
- Location: Vancouver, British Columbia, Canadaĺ

Submerged Records is an independent record label based in Vancouver, British Columbia, Canada. It was founded in 2005 by members of the band Hinterland. Submerged specializes in what it calls "dreamo", an invented genre that blends elements of dreampop, shoegaze, space rock, post-rock, and related styles. Artists on Submerged Records include Hinterland, Storyboard, Way to Go, Einstein, and Windows '78. Releases by Submerged Records include The Picture Plane (2006) and Pan Pan Medico (2008) by Hinterland, The Window Seat (2006) by Windows '78, Storyboard (2006) by Storyboard, and Pseudonym (2009) by Way to Go, Einstein.

== See also ==
- List of record labels
