= Zerbin =

Canadian indie rock band

- Origin: Edmonton, Alberta, Canada
- Genres: Indie rock; indie pop
- Years active: 2009–present
- Label: Independent/Skinnydip Records
- Members: Jason Zerbin
- Past members: Peter Mol; Duran Ritz

Zerbin are a Canadian indie rock band named after their frontman and vocalist, Jason Zerbin. The other permanent member in the band is guitarist Peter Mol. The group formed in Edmonton in 2009, but moved to the west coast of British Columbia in 2012.

The band's releases consist of the albums Of Fools and Gold (2010) and Darling (2015), and the EPs Christmas! (2011) and Touch (2013).

Zerbin received two 2012 Edmonton Music Awards: Music Video of the Year and Single of the Year, for "New Earth". In July 2015, "New Earth" was voted #17 out of the Top 102 Canadian Songs by listeners of Edmonton's modern rock radio station SONiC 102.9.

Zerbin was selected as Band of the Month for July 2014 by the Victoria, British Columbia modern rock radio station The Zone @ 91-3, as well as by Edmonton's SONIC 102.9 in March 2015.

In 2019, Zerbin and Mol released two singles under the name BROTHER.

On February 8, 2019, Jason Zerbin released his first solo single, titled "Stay, Pt.1".

On August 19, 2020, Zerbin released a new single, titled "Real Strong Woman".

In 2023, Jason Zerbin was charged with sexual assault related to an incident that occurred while he was a youth pastor in 2015.

== Discography ==
Albums

- Of Fools and Gold (2010)
- Darling (2015)

EPs

- Christmas! (2011)
- Touch (2013)
- Missing Years: Sin, Love (B-Sides) (2019)

Singles

- "New Earth" (2011)
- "Take Your Heart" (2013)
- "Intrld" (as BROTHER) (2019)
- "Porto Cristo" (as BROTHER) (2019)
- "Violetear" w/ ICELANDIA (2020)
- "Real Strong Woman" w/ Family of Things (2020)
- "Bonnie Doon" (2020)
