= Fight for Anarchy =

Fight For Anarchy

EP by Ladyhawk
- Released: May 22, 2007
- Recorded: Early 2006
- Genre: Indie rock
- Length: 18:32
- Label: Jagjaguwar

Fight For Anarchy is an EP by Canadian indie rock band Ladyhawk, released on March, 22 2007 by Jagjaguwar.

The EP was recorded during a day-long session between tours in the first half of 2006.

== Reception ==
Professional ratings
Review scores
Source	Rating
Pitchfork	(5.4/10)

== Track listing ==
1. "War" – 2:46
2. "If You Run" – 2:00
3. "Amber Jam" – 0:47
4. "Boy You Got Another Thing Coming" – 5:32
5. "Red Teeth" – 5:34
6. "You Ran" – 1:56
