= Lightning Dust (album) =

Studio album by Lightning Dust
- Released: 2007
- Genre: Indie rock
- Length: 32:54
- Label: Jagjaguwar

Lightning Dust chronology
Lightning Dust (2007)	Infinite Light (2009)

Professional ratings
Review scores
Source	Rating
AllMusic	3.5/5 stars
Pitchfork	(7.2/10)

Lightning Dust is the self-titled debut album by Canadian indie rock band Lightning Dust, released in 2007 on Jagjaguwar.

The song "Wind Me Up" was featured as the free Single of the Week in the iTunes music store (Canada). The single "Listened On" reached #1 on CBC Radio 3's R3-30 charts the week of September 20, 2007.

== Track listing ==
1. "Listened On" – 2:43
2. "When You Go" – 2:49
3. "Wind Me Up" – 1:39
4. "Take Me Back" – 3:50
5. "Jump In" – 2:22
6. "Heaven" – 3:37
7. "Castles and Caves" – 5:24
8. "Highway" – 2:50
9. "Breathe" – 3:19
10. "Days Go By" – 4:21
