= Collapsing Opposites =

Canadian indie rock band

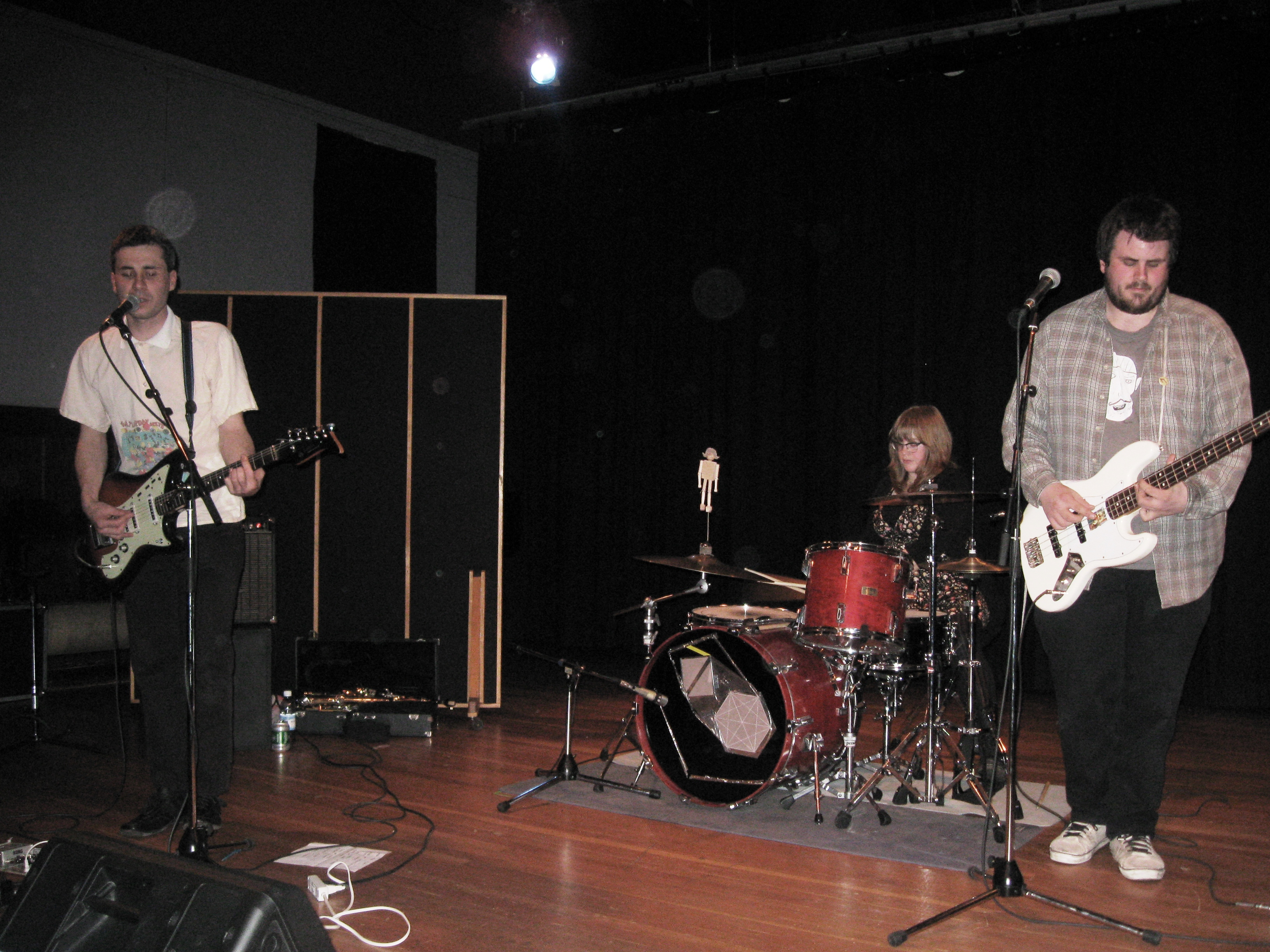
- Collapsing Opposites live at the Western Front, East Vancouver - 27 March 2009

Background information
- Origin: Vancouver, British Columbia, Canada
- Years active: 2002–present
- Past members: Jason, Aaron, Enzio, Cody, Jarrett, Jessica, Sean, Chris, Patrick, Jeff, Geoff, Jason, Caitlin, Adam, Kristine, Tristan, Wenzel
- Website: collapsingopposites.com

Collapsing Opposites is an indie rock group and music project from Vancouver, British Columbia. It was founded in 2002 by artist and musician Ryan McCormick and has subsequently included over 18 different members.

== History ==
Collapsing Opposites released their first EP Demonstration in 2002 and followed it up with five full-length albums including Sincerity/Sarcasm (2004), Mean Letters (2005), Inside Chance (2007) In Time (2010), and Real Moving (2011). The group has also released one other EP (The Story of the Rocks in 2008), two compilations (Microchips Implanted in Your Brain in 2005 and Music and Words in 2007) and a split 7" record with the band Bible Belts in 2008.

The band's 2007 album Inside Chance reached number 16 on the Canadian National Campus and Community Radio charts; In Time reached number 37 and Mean Letters reached number 128. The band has been covered in a variety of sources such as Exclaim!, BeatRoute, The Georgia Straight, Front Magazine, Tom Tom Magazine, Discorder, Weird Canada, Splendid Ezine, and Broken Pencil.

Members of Collapsing Opposites have collaborated with other art and music projects such as Whose Museum, Music Waste, Four on the Floor Projects and the Safe Amplification Site Society.

== Discography ==
- Demonstration (CD-R EP) (Independent) (2002)
- Sincerity / Sarcasm (CD-R album) (Independent) (2004)
- Mean Letters (CD album) (Independent) (2005)
- Microchips Implanted in Your Brain (CD-R compilation) (Independent) (2005)
- Inside Chance (CD album) (Local Kids Make Good Records) (Independent) (2007)
- Music and Words (Cassette compilation) (French Immersion Records) (2007)
- The Story of the Rocks (MP3 EP) (Independent) (2008)
- The Cost of Music (7-inch single split with Bible Belts) (Needs More Ram Records) (2008)
- In Time (12" LP/MP3 album) (Independent) (2010)
- Real Moving (Cassette/MP3 album) (Radical Clatter) (2011)
