= They Shoot Horses, Don't They? (band) =

- Origin: Vancouver, British Columbia
- Genres: Indie rock
- Years active: 2003–2008
- Label: Kill Rock Stars
- Past members: Nutbrown, Pietro, Chris-a-riffic, Ryan Mc, Robb, Julia, Eli, Shane, Nathan G, Kirsten, Bruce
- Website: www.theyshoothorses.org

They Shoot Horses, Don't They? was a post punk band from Vancouver, British Columbia, Canada. The band had an eclectic style, combining horns and keyboards with pop and rock rhythms.

== History ==
The band was founded by Nut Brown in 2003. Members included Consuelos and Bruce Dyck.

Their debut album Boo Hoo Hoo Boo was released on the Kill Rock Stars label February 21, 2006; at that time the band had eight members. KRS released Pick Up Sticks on June 5, 2007. Both full-length albums were recorded by Colin Stewart at the Hive, in Burnaby, British Columbia. The self-titled EP was recorded by Jesse Gander, also at the Hive.

They Shoot Horses, Don't They? disbanded in April, 2008. Their last show was at the Astoria Pub in Vancouver, British Columbia, Canada.

Keyboardist Chris Alscher (also known as Chris-A-Riffic) has become a regular guest host on CBC Radio 3. Saxophonist Ryan McCormick later played in the band Collapsing Opposites.

== Discography ==
=== They Shoot Horses (EP) (2004) ===
  1. Transmitting
  2. Hit My Head
  3. The Farthest Reaching
  4. Sad Sack

=== They Shoot Horses Tour EP (EP) (2005) ===
  1. Emptyhead
  2. Hiccup
  3. Sunlight
  4. Thank You
  5. Grand Idea

=== Boo Hoo Hoo Boo (2006) ===
  1. Emptyhead
  2. Hiccup
  3. Sunlight
  4. Seeds
  5. The Bugs
  6. Three
  7. Concussion
  8. Big Dot
  9. Low Life
  10. Words
  11. Apple

=== Pick Up Sticks (2007) ===
Pick Up Sticks

Studio album by They Shoot Horses, Don't They?
- Released: June 5, 2007

Professional ratings
Review scores
Source	Rating
Allmusic	link
Prefix	5/10 stars

  1. One Last Final Push (2:54)
  2. The Guest (3:09)
  3. A Place Called La (4:05)
  4. Speck of Dust (4:32)
  5. That's a Good Question (4:22)
  6. The Hallway (3:24)
  7. What is That? (3:21)
  8. Busted Bell (5:30)
  9. You Know Me (4:21)
  10. Wrong Directions (3:00)
