= Brasstronaut =

Canadian band, formed 2007

- Origin: Vancouver, British Columbia, Canada
- Genres: Indie rock, jazz
- Years active: 2008–2017
- Labels: Unfamiliar Records (Canada), Tin Angel Records (UK)
- Members: Bryan Davies (trumpet); Edo Van Breemen (piano, vocals); Brennan Saul (drums); John Walsh (bass); Tariq Hussain (guitar); Sam Davidson (clarinet)

Brasstronaut was a band from Vancouver, British Columbia, Canada, with roots in pop, rock and jazz. It was formed in 2007. Their line-up was Bryan Davies on trumpet, Edo Van Breemen on piano and vocals, Sam Davidson on clarinet and EWI, Tariq Hussain on lap steel and electric guitar, Brennan Saul on drums, and John Walsh on bass.

== Old World Lies ==
Brasstronaut's first release, the EP Old World Lies, was released in 2008 on Unfamiliar Records and received positive press and blog response. It was accompanied by a video for the song "Requiem for a Scene". On October 20, 2010, Brasstronaut performed a version of Old World Lies on a balcony in London for the viral music show BalconyTV.

== Mount Chimaera ==
The band spent early 2009 in Banff, Alberta, recording their first full-length album as part of a Winter Music Creative Residency at the Banff Centre. After postponing the release date of September 23, they revamped and re-recorded some of the songs in private studios in Vancouver and finally released Mount Chimaera on March 2, 2010.

The tracks Old World Lies and Requiem for a Scene were used in the soundtrack for the game WET.

Brasstronaut's members went on to become active in music education and music therapy. Van Breemen has become a composer for film and television productions.

== Discography ==
Studio albums

- 2010 – Mount Chimaera (Unfamiliar Records)
- 2012 – Mean Sun (Unfamiliar Records)
- 2016 – Brasstronaut (Hybridity Music)

EPs

- 2008 – Old World Lies (Unfamiliar Records)
- 2011 – Opportunity (Digital Kunstrasen)

Singles

- "Old World Lies"
- "Requiem for a Scene"
- "Mean Sun"
- "Bounce"
- "The Grove"
- "Raveshadow"
- "Hawk"
- "Sooner Or Later"

== Awards ==
Mount Chimaera was long-listed for the 2010 Polaris Music Prize.

"Hearts Trompet" from Mount Chimaera won the SOCAN Songwriting Prize in 2010.
