= Immaculate Machine =

21st-century Canadian indie pop band

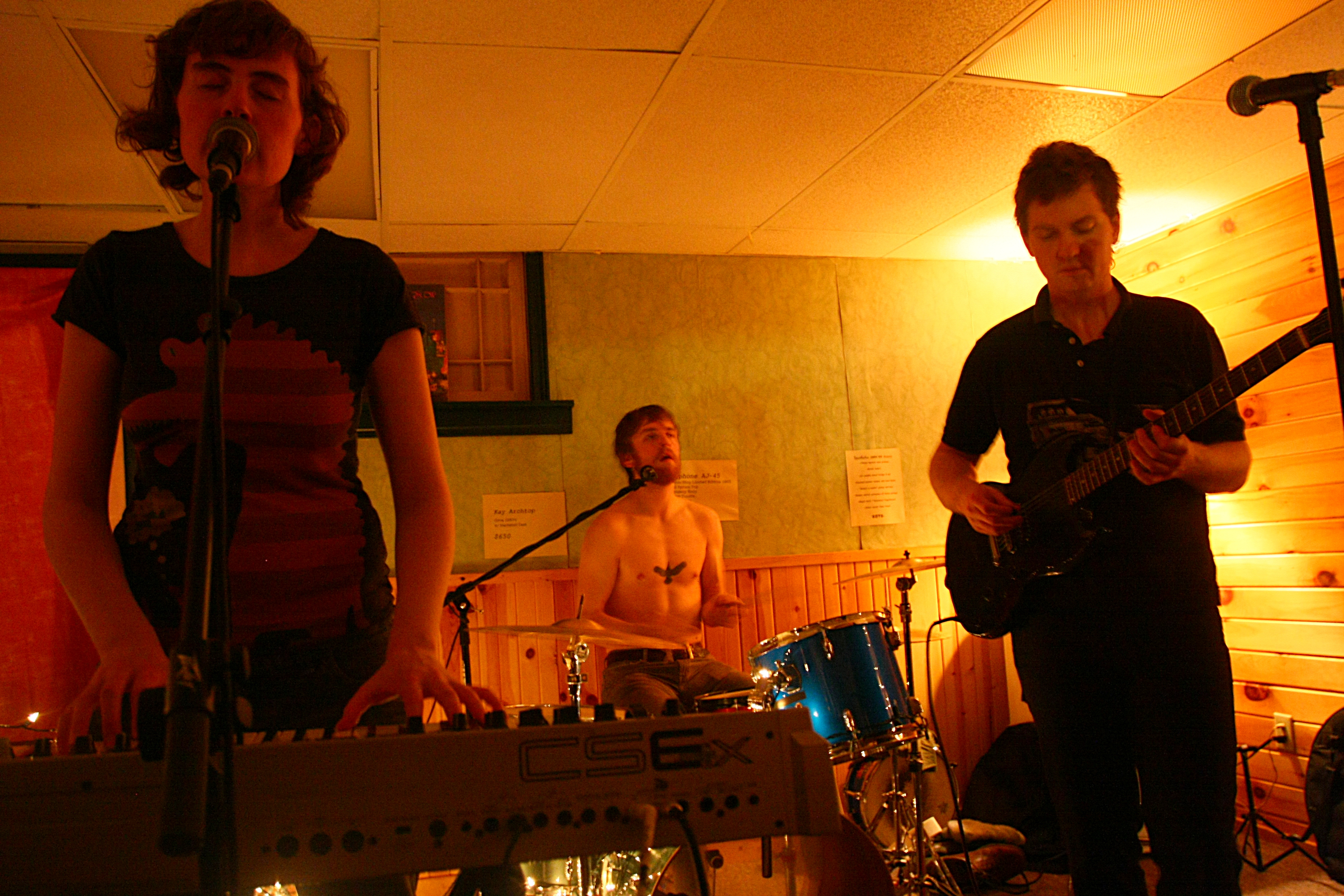
- Immaculate Machine performing in 2008

Background information
- Origin: Victoria, British Columbia, Canada
- Genres: Indie pop; indie rock
- Years active: 2001–2011, 2024
- Label: Mint
- Past members: Brooke Gallupe; Kathryn Calder; Luke Kozlowski; Leslie Rewega; Brooke Wilken; Caitlin Gallupe; Aden Collinge; Jordan Minkoff

Immaculate Machine was a Canadian indie pop band from Victoria, British Columbia, active from 2001 to 2011.

The band's name is taken from the lyrics of "One-Trick Pony" from the album One-Trick Pony by Paul Simon.

== History ==
Immaculate Machine was founded in 2001 by Brooke Gallupe, Kathryn Calder and Luke Kozlowski, who had met as high school students in Victoria. Gallupe played guitar and sang, Kozlowski played drums and sang, and Calder played keyboards and sang. She was also responsible for playing basslines on her keyboard. The band released The View and Transporter independently before signing to Mint Records in early 2005.

Their Mint Records debut, Ones and Zeros, came out on September 6, 2005, and they supported the album by touring Canada and the United States with The New Pornographers. That year, Calder became a member of the New Pornographers, appearing on the album Twin Cinema and touring with the band. She is the niece of New Pornographers leader A. C. Newman.

Their third album, Immaculate Machine's Fables, was released on June 12, 2007. That month, the album's first single "Jarhand" was featured as the iTunes free single of the week.

Prior to the band's fourth album, High on Jackson Hill, Calder stepped back from Immaculate Machine. She had become busy touring and recording with the New Pornographers, and caring for her mother, who was suffering from ALS. At the same time, Kozlowski quit the band to return to school. High on Jackson Hill was released in 2009. It was largely the work of Gallupe and producer Colin Stewart, although Calder contributed one song. By the autumn of 2009, Gallupe was leading a live incarnation of Immaculate Machine whose membership he admitted was "very fluid." Band members at this time included Caitlin Gallupe—Brooke's sister—on bass and vocals, Brooke Wilken on guitar and vocals, Leslie Rewega on keyboards and vocals, and Aden Collinge on drums. Calder and guitarist Jordan Minkoff also played at some shows in 2009.

In early 2011, after over a year of inactivity, Immaculate Machine officially disbanded. A message posted on the band's blog stated that "[w]ith the fracture of the original lineup, the motivation to continue Immaculate Machine waned." In August 2024, the band played a reunion concert in Victoria, British Columbia.

== Members ==
- Brooke Gallupe – vocals, guitar (2001–2011, 2024)
- Kathryn Calder – vocals, keyboards (2001–2011, 2024)
- Luke Kozlowski – drums, vocals (2001–2009, 2024)
- Aden Collinge – drums (2009–2011)
- Caitlin Gallupe – bass, vocals (2009–2011)
- Jordan Minkoff – guitar (2009–2011)
- Leslie Rewega – keyboards, vocals (2009–2011)
- Brooke Wilken – guitar, vocals (2009–2011)

== Discography ==
=== Singles ===
- "Won't Be Pretty" (7" single) (2008)

=== EPs ===
- The View (2003)
- Les Uns Mais Pas Les Autres (2006)

=== Albums ===
- Transporter (2004)
- Ones and Zeros (2005)
- Immaculate Machine's Fables (2007)
- High on Jackson Hill (2009)

== See also ==
- Canadian rock
- List of Canadian musicians
- List of bands from Canada
- List of bands from British Columbia

== Sources ==
- Fontana, Kaitlin (2011). Fresh at Twenty: The Oral History of Mint Records. ECW Press. ISBN 978-1-77041-004-6.
