= Lightning Dust =

Canadian indie rock band

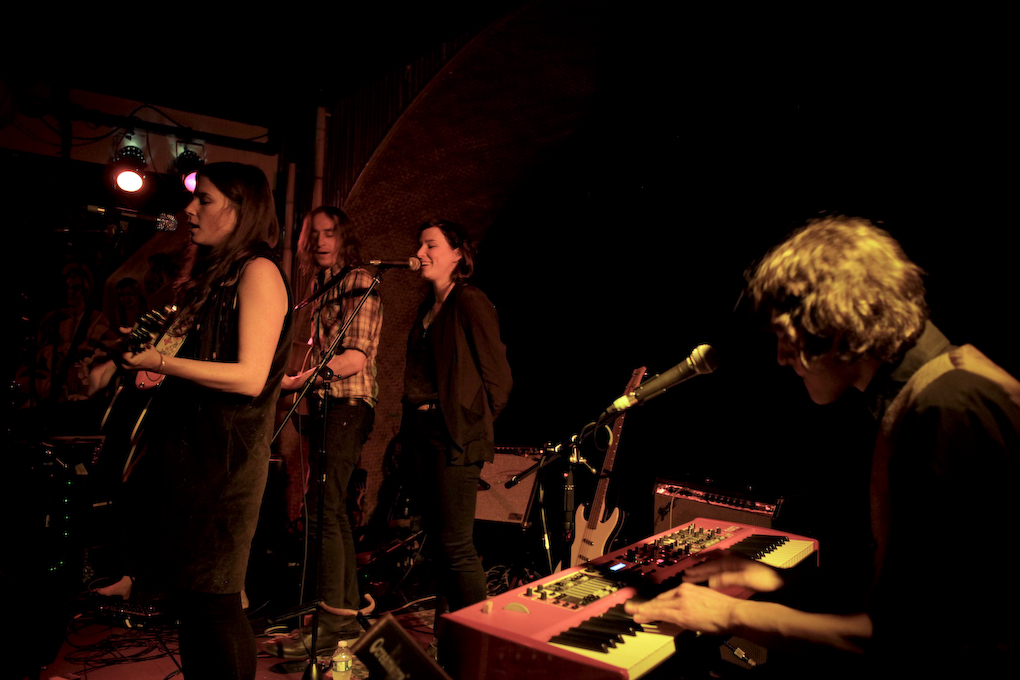
- Lightning Dust, October 2011

Background information
- Origin: Vancouver, British Columbia, Canada
- Genres: Indie rock, goth
- Years active: 2007–present
- Label: Jagjaguwar
- Members: Amber Webber; Joshua Wells
- Website: Lightning Dust - Archived

Lightning Dust is a Canadian indie rock band formed in 2007 and based in Vancouver, British Columbia. The band is a side project of Amber Webber and Joshua Wells, both members of Black Mountain.

== History ==
Wells and Webber formed Lightning Dust and began creating a sound that was softer and more melodic than Black Mountain's hard rock, with haunting, minimalist instrumentation and spooky, goth-like lyrics written by Webber. The band released its self-titled debut album on Jagjaguwar in 2007. The song "Wind Me Up" was featured as the free "Single of the Week" in the iTunes music store in Canada.

Another album, Infinite Light, was released in August 2009. The band performed at Matt Groening's All Tomorrow's Parties festival in May 2010 in Minehead, England.

A third album, Fantasy, which featured synthesized music, drumming, some industrial instrumental work, all accompanying the band's spooky songs, was released June 25, 2013. This album included the song "Loaded Gun"; in 2014 it was used in Quebecois television series Série noire, on SRC.

They released a fourth album on 4 October 2019, named Spectre. They have released three singles from the album: "Devoted To", "Led Astray", and "A Pretty Picture".

== Discography ==
- Lightning Dust (2007)
- Infinite Light (2009)
- Fantasy (2013)
- Spectre (2019)
- Nostalgia Killer (2023)

== See also ==
- Music of Canada
- Music of Vancouver
- Canadian rock
- List of Canadian musicians
- List of bands from Canada
- List of bands from British Columbia
- Category:Canadian musical groups
