= Duplex! =

Canadian children's music band

- Origin: Vancouver, British Columbia, Canada
- Genres: Children's music
- Years active: 2005–present
- Labels: Mint
- Members: Abe Caruso; Annie Wilkinson; Justin Kellam; Sierra Terhoch; Matt Caruso; Saoirse Soley; Shaun Brodie; Veda Hille

Duplex! is a children's music band from Vancouver, British Columbia, Canada that claims influences from urban folk to punk rock. The members range in birth years from 1967 to 2002; both toddler Abe Caruso and noted Canadian musician Veda Hille played on the debut album.

== History ==
Duplex! formed in 2005 in Vancouver, as part of a recording project organized by Veda Hille. The adult members were Annie Wilkinson, Justin Kellam, Sierra Terhoch, Matt Caruso, Shaun Brodie and Veda Hille. The band also included teenager Saoirse Soley and toddler Abe Caruso. They and released their debut album, Ablum, through Mint Records, the same year. Some of the songs were written by children.

The band's second album, Worser, was released in 2009 in Mint Records.

== Discography ==
Duplex! has released two albums.

- Ablum (2005)
- Worser (2009)

== See also ==
- Music of Canada
- Canadian rock
- List of Canadian musicians
- List of bands from Canada
- Category:Canadian musical groups
