= No Kids (band) =

Canadian indie pop band

- Origin: Vancouver, British Columbia, Canada
- Genres: Indie pop
- Years active: 2008–present
- Labels: Tomlab
- Members: Julia Chirka; Justin Kellam; Nick Krgovich

No Kids is a Canadian indie pop band from Vancouver, British Columbia.

== History ==
The band was formed by Justin Kellam, Julia Chirka, and Nick Krgovich following the departure of Larissa Loyva from their earlier band P:ano.

The band's debut album, Come Into My House, was released February 19, 2008, on Tomlab. They toured Canada and the United States through the spring and summer of 2008 in support of the record. The album was given a generally favourable rating on Metacritic.

The band contributed to a compilation album, Friends in Bellwoods II, in 2009, and toured with the band Mount Eerie and Tara Jane O’Neil. They then released an EP, Judy At The Grove, in 2010.

== Discography ==
- Come Into My House (2008)
- Judy At The Grove EP (2010)

=== Compilations ===
- Friends in Bellwoods II (2009): "All That Heaven Allows"
