= Ladyhawk (album) =

Studio album by Ladyhawk
- Released: June 6, 2006
- Genre: Indie rock
- Length: 38:34
- Label: Jagjaguwar

Professional ratings
Review scores
Source	Rating
AllMusic	link
Pitchfork	(7.1/10) link

Ladyhawk is an album by Canadian indie rock band Ladyhawk, released in 2006.

The songs "Drunk Eyes" and "The Dugout" can be heard in the 2009 film The Thaw.

== Track listing ==
1. "48 Hours" – 2:01
2. "The Dugout" – 5:22
3. "My Old Jacknife" – 2:50
4. "Long 'Til the Morning" – 7:04
5. "Came in Brave" – 3:06
6. "Advice" – 3:48
7. "Sad Eyes/Blue Eyes" – 3:28
8. "Teenage Love Song" – 2:22
9. "Drunk Eyes" – 3:20
10. "New Joker" – 5:18
