= Brooke Gallupe =

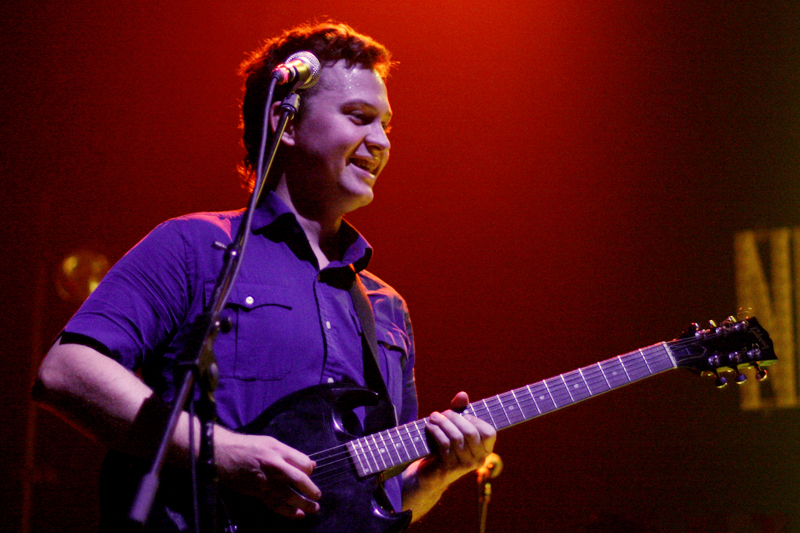
- Performing with Immaculate Machine at Webster Hall, 2007.

Background information
- Instruments: Vocals; Guitar; Bass; Organ
- Label: Mint

Brooke Gallupe is the leader of the Canadian indie rock bands Immaculate Machine and Rugged Uncle.

In addition to playing rock music, Gallupe has trained as an opera singer and has played with the Victoria Symphony.

Gallupe is also a comic artist. His autobiographical comics, which often revolve around his band Immaculate Machine, have been published in Tofu Magazine, Chart Magazine, Lickity Split and the Mint Records Zine.
