= Larissa Loyva =

Canadian musician

- Also known as: Kellarissa
- Origin: Vancouver, British Columbia, Canada
- Genres: Indie pop
- Occupations: Musician, songwriter
- Instruments: Vocals, Yamaha SK-15, Microkorg, Trumpet
- Years active: 1999–present
- Label: Mint

Larissa Loyva is a Canadian, classically-trained indie pop singer-songwriter and keyboardist of Finnish descent. Based in Vancouver, she has released material and performed as a solo artist under the stage name Kellarissa (Finnish for "in the basement"), as well as with the bands P:ano and Fake Tears.

She released Flamingo, her debut album as Kellarissa, in 2008 on Mint Records. On Flamingo, she performs songs in both English and Finnish. Her second album on Mint Records is Moon of Neptune, released in 2011.

Ocean Electro, her third album with Mint Records, was released March 23, 2018, and her fourth album, Voice Leading, was released in 2022.

In 2011, Loyva toured as a member of Destroyer, playing keyboards and singing backing vocals. She has functioned similarly in Lost Lovers Brigade, Fanshaw, A Luna Red, Cult Babies, and How to Dress Well. She has shared songwriting duties in The Choir Practice and Fake Tears, and is a regular backup singer for Rose Melberg.

== Discography ==
- Flamingo (Mint Records, 2008)
- Moon of Neptune (Mint Records, 2011)
- Ocean Electro (Mint Records, 2018)
- Voice Leading (Mint Records, 2022)
