= Ladyhawk (band) =

Canadian indie rock band

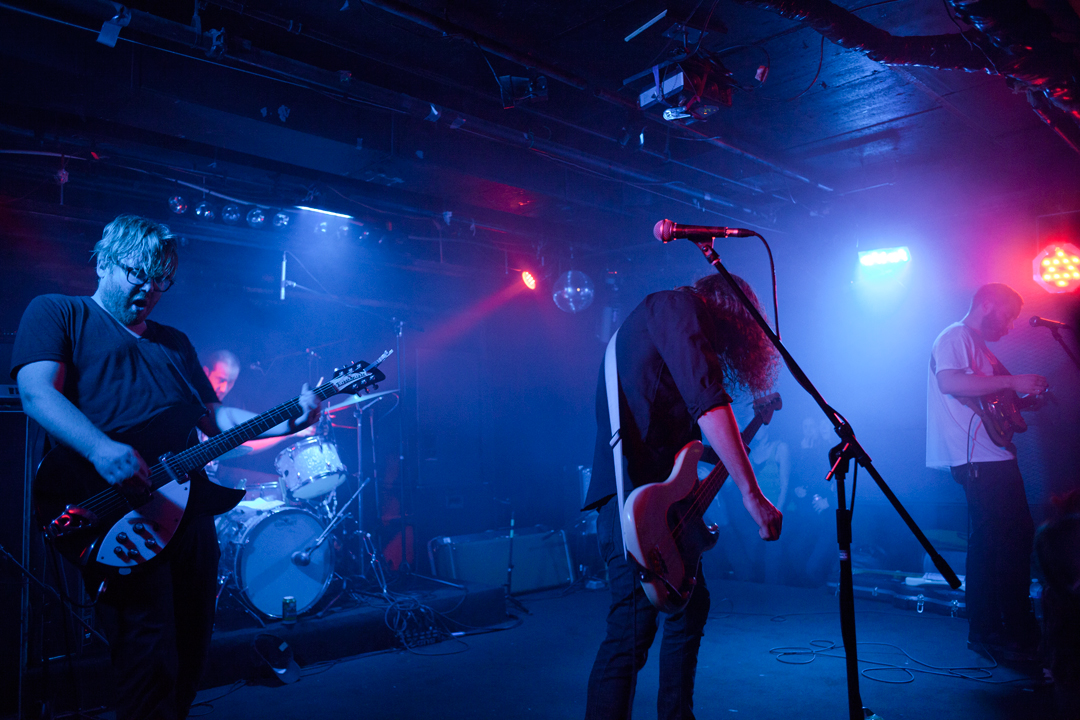
- Ladyhawk performing in 2012

Background information
- Origin: Vancouver, British Columbia, Canada
- Genre: Indie rock
- Years active: 2004–present
- Label: Jagjaguwar
- Members: Duffy Driediger; Darcy Hancock; Sean Hawryluk; Ryan Peters
- Website: ladyhawkladyhawk.com

Ladyhawk is a Canadian indie rock band based in Vancouver. They have released three albums and an EP, and have toured across Canada several times.

== History ==
Ladyhawk formed in February 2004 in Vancouver, British Columbia. Their debut album, Ladyhawk was released on June 6, 2006, on Jagjaguwar Records. The lead single on the album was "Dugout", followed by "My Old Jacknife". Their next album, Shots, was recorded in an old barn in their hometown of Kelowna and released in 2008. During the making of Shots, a documentary was filmed about the Ladyhawks, called Let Me Be Fictional.

The songs "Drunk Eyes" and "The Dugout" (from Ladyhawk) can be heard in the 2009 film The Thaw.

In 2012, the band released the album No Can Do, and then went on a promotional tour around Canada. to promote it. Soon after, the band went on hiatus, but reformed in 2014.

== Members ==
- Duffy Driediger – guitar, vocals
- Darcy Hancock – guitar, vocals
- Sean Hawryluk – bass
- Ryan Peters – drums

== Discography ==
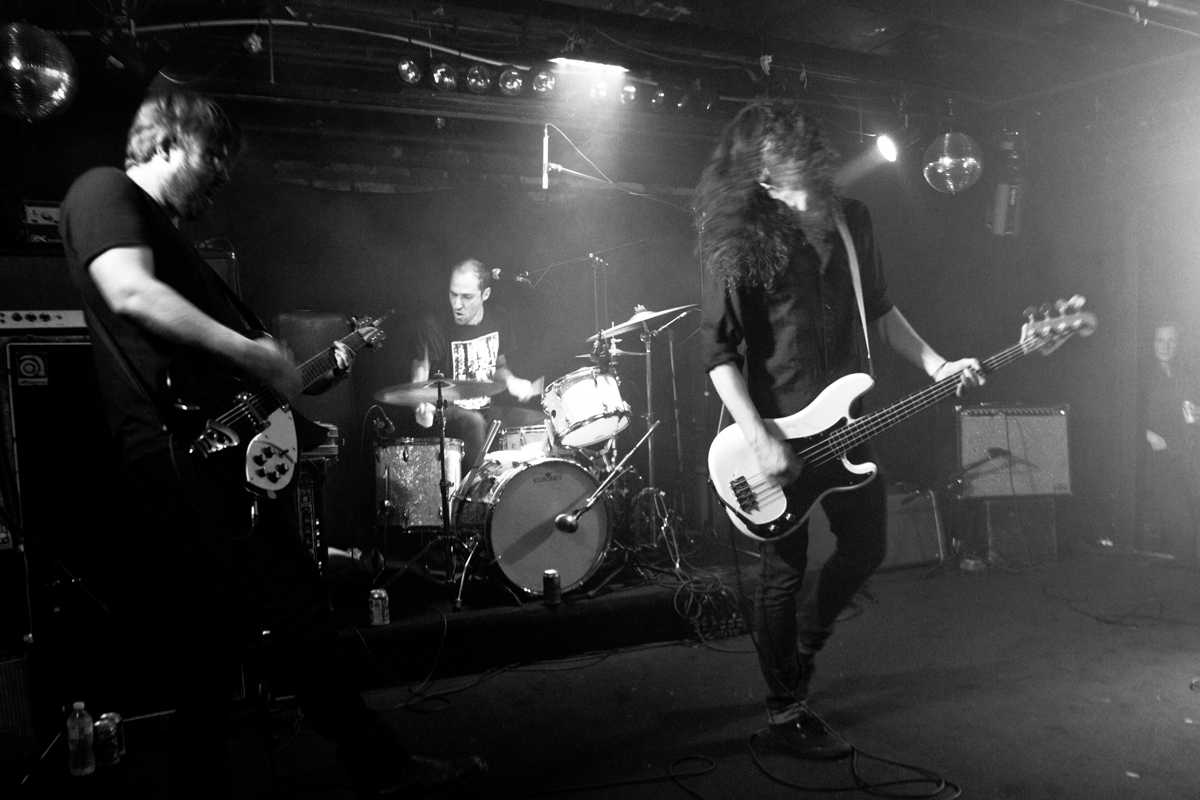
Ladyhawk performing in Vancouver in 2012

=== Ladyhawk ===
- Ladyhawk (Jagjaguwar, 2006)
- Fight for Anarchy EP (Jagjaguwar, 2007)
- Shots (Jagjaguwar, 2008)
- No Can Do (Triple Crown Audio, 2012)

=== Side projects ===
- Drumheller – Sports (Triple Crown Audio, 2009)
- Scriptural Supplies – Duffy and The Doubters (Triple Crown Audio, 2010)
- Baptists – Baptists (Southern Lord Records, 2011)

== See also ==
- Music of Vancouver
- Canadian rock
- List of Canadian musicians
- List of bands from Canada
- List of bands from British Columbia
