= The Former Site Of =

Studio album by the New Pornographers
- Released: March 27, 2026
- Studio: Multiple locations in British Columbia and the U.S.
- Genre: Indie folk
- Length: 41:13
- Label: Merge
- Producer: A.C. Newman

The New Pornographers chronology
| Continue as a Guest (2023) | The Former Site Of (2026) |

Singles from The Former Site Of
- 1. "Votive" Released: January 21, 2026; 2. "Pure Sticker Shock" Released: February 10, 2026; 3. "Spooky Action" Released: March 2, 2026

The Former Site Of is the tenth studio album by Canadian indie rock band the New Pornographers, released on March 27, 2026 via Merge Records. The record was led by the singles "Votive", "Pure Sticker Shock", and "Spooky Action" and was also preceded by an earlier version of "Ballad of the Last Payphone".

It is their first album since Brill Bruisers (2014) to not feature drummer Joe Seiders following his arrest and removal from the band in 2025. Much of the album was re-recorded, with drum parts instead provided by session player Charley Drayton. The record was written and produced by bandleader A.C. Newman.

== Background and recording ==
On April 9, 2025, drummer Joe Seiders was suddenly arrested on multiple charges, including possession of child pornography. The band subsequently issued a statement on Instagram stating they all were "absolutely shocked, horrified and devastated" by the news, and they "immediately severed all ties" with him. Seiders had joined the group in 2014 after the release of Brill Bruisers earlier that year, subsequently playing on Whiteout Conditions (2017), In the Morse Code of Brake Lights (2019), Continue as a Guest (2023), and the single "Ballad of the Last Payphone". Later that November, A.C. Newman gave an interview to Rolling Stone, saying that he became aware of Seiders' arrest about one day afterwards, but it took several days for the band members to process what had happened. They also considered renaming the group based on the nature of the charges but ultimately kept the name.

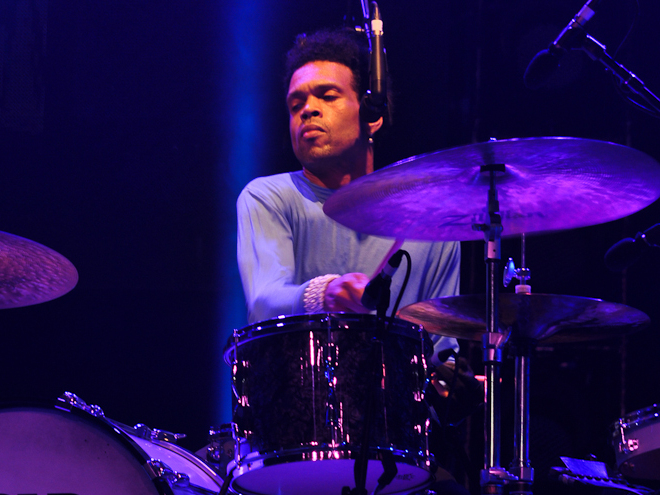
Session musician Charley Drayton (pictured) played the drums on The Former Site Of.

Newman had originally anticipated that the follow-up to Continue as a Guest would be completed by the end of 2023, but it became delayed because Neko Case had to fulfill a separate eight-month obligation. By April 2025, the band had nearly finished the record, but with the news of Seiders' arrest, they decided to scrap his drum parts and re-record with a new drummer. They enlisted session drummer Charley Drayton and recorded his parts at Area 52 Studios near Woodstock, New York with engineer Dave Cook in either June or July 2025; both Drayton and Cook had previously worked together when recording "Love Shack" by the B-52s. Much of the remaining work was re-recorded as well, including Newman's vocals on "Wish You Could See Me I'm Killing It". The basic framework for the songs on the album were constructed by Newman in his home studio, later finished with the rest of the band in increments. Altogether, the album was recorded in several locations between the U.S. and the Canadian province of British Columbia.

== Title and artwork ==
The cover artwork, created by Michael Arthur, displays the title and band's name together such that it reads as "The Former Site Of The New Pornographers", with a slightly different typeface to distinguish between the two. According to Newman, this was intentionally made to suggest that the band who once made Mass Romantic (2000) has since changed by this point in their career. He said that inspiration for the title came from road signs he had encountered during his travels in upstate New York. One sign in particular that caught his attention read "the former site of West Hurley", which was a village near the Ashokan Reservoir that was relocated and flooded in order to supply water to New York City.

== Composition ==
The Former Site Of continues the approach that started with its predecessor, Continue as a Guest (2023). The album favors more of a melancholic, introspective, and muted approach in contrast to the hook-driven indie pop and power pop that had previously defined their career, but it retains the atmospheric instrumentation and the layered vocals from Newman, Case, and Kathryn Calder. However, unlike a number of their records, The Former Site Of does not include a song where Case has the sole vocal part. In Classic Rock magazine, music journalist Mark Beaumont described the album's melodies as indie folk, accompanied by Case's vocal harmonies and Calder's electronic accompaniments. On "Bonus Mai Tais", written about a friend suffering from cancer, Newman and Case share vocals that deal with mortality.

== Promotion ==
=== Announcement and singles ===
In early 2025, the New Pornographers released a limited 7-inch vinyl single "Ballad of the Last Payphone" with B-side "Ego Death for Beginners", made available to Vinyl Club-tier members of Newman's Substack page. The A-side was later released digitally on April 2 with a music video animated by Michael Arthur. The release of this single predates Seider's arrest and subsequent re-recording of the album.

The Former Site Of was announced on January 21, 2026 and was led by the single "Votive" with another music video by Arthur. Two more singles were released in anticipation of the record: "Pure Sticker Shock" on February 10 and "Spooky Action" on March 2.

=== Tour ===
In November 2025, having not performed live since Seiders' arrest, they announced a 2026 U.S. tour starting on April 22 at The Wilbur in Boston, Massachusetts and ending on May 21 at the 9:30 Club in Washington, D.C. Josh Wells, known for his work with Destroyer and Black Mountain, will play the drums while on tour, and for each U.S. date, they are to be supported by Will Sheff of the band Okkervil River. Shortly before the release of the album, the band announced a fall expansion to their 2026 U.S. tour, dubbed The Former Site Of Tour. The dates begin on September 12 at La Rosa in Tucson, Arizona and end on October 3 at the State Theatre in Portland, Maine.

== Critical reception ==
Professional ratings
Aggregate scores
| Source | Rating |
|---|---|
| AnyDecentMusic? | 7.2/10 |
| Metacritic | 78/100 |
Review scores
| Source | Rating |
| AllMusic | 3.5/5 stars |
| Classic Rock | 8/10 |
| Exclaim! | 7/10 |
| Hot Press | 8.5/10 |
| Mojo | 4/5 stars |
| MusicOMH | 4/5 stars |
| Paste | B− |
| Record Collector | 4/5 stars |
| Uncut | 8/10 |
| Under the Radar | 6/10 |

According to the review aggregator Metacritic, The Former Site Of received "generally favorable reviews" based on a weighted average score of 78 out of 100 from ten critic scores. The review aggregator AnyDecentMusic? gave the album a weighted average score of 7.2 out of 10 from ten critic scores.

In an 8 out of 10 review for Uncut magazine, Bud Scoppa commented that the record's background "inevitably bring[s] an additional layer of darkness to allusively eloquent, quietly agitated songs" such as "Pure Sticker Shock" and "Votive". Tom Doyle of Mojo magazine stated that despite the tumultuous background of the album, the resulting material was "generally gentle" and "compelling" overall, rating it four stars out of five. In addition, they highlighted Newman and Case's vocal chemistry on "Bonus Mai Tais". Editors at AllMusic rated The Former Site Of three-and-a-half stars out of five, with reviewer Timothy Monger calling it an introspective collection that "burns several degrees cooler" than its "glimmering exterior". Monger also noted that the vocalists' comparatively weary performances mirror the characters portrayed in the lyrics. Elsewhere, in a four-star review for Record Collector, Kevin Harley thought the album's story-based songs were warm and colorful, resulting in a record replete with "resilient characters and sparkling craft".

Alex Hudson of Exclaim! said that the record, save for "Votive", felt more like a natural successor to Newman's solo record Shut Down the Streets (2012) due to the presence of acoustic guitars and synthesizers, but they added this "makes sense" since the band has largely been fronted by Newman since its inception. Rating The Former Site Of 7 out of 10, Hudson noted a heightened focus on the lyrics and described Newman's approach as "delightful rather than simply a way to fill the syllables" in the melodies. On BrooklynVegan, it was named one of their albums of the week, and reviewer Bill Pearis opined that it was their best album since Brill Bruisers (2014). He said it was a marked improvement in Newman's lyricism, and he lauded the band for letting synthesizers drive the music, rather than relying too much on hooks. In a more mixed assessment for Under the Radar, Scotty Dransfield thought that while the lyrics often succeed in being reflective without becoming too sentimental, most of the songs lack fulfilling musical climaxes.

== Track listing ==
All tracks are written by A.C. Newman.

The Former Site Of track listing
| No. | Title | Length |
|---|---|---|
| 1. | "Great Princess Story" | 4:11 |
| 2. | "Pure Sticker Shock" | 4:09 |
| 3. | "Ballad of the Last Payphone" | 3:49 |
| 4. | "Spooky Action" | 4:53 |
| 5. | "Wish You Could See Me I'm Killing It" | 3:39 |
| 6. | "Votive" | 3:45 |
| 7. | "Wine Remembers the Water" | 1:48 |
| 8. | "Calligraphy" | 3:47 |
| 9. | "Bonus Mai Tais" | 4:34 |
| 10. | "The Former Site Of" | 6:38 |
| Total length: | | 41:13 |

== Personnel ==
Credits are adapted from Bandcamp.

=== The New Pornographers ===
- A.C. Newman – vocals, guitar, bass, keyboards
- John Collins – bass, guitar, keyboards
- Kathryn Calder – keyboards, vocals
- Neko Case – vocals
- Todd Fancey – guitar

=== Additional musicians ===
- Charley Drayton – drums
- Zach Djanikian – bass, guitar, mandolin, soprano saxophone, tenor saxophone
- Macie Stewart – strings
- JP Carter – trumpet, effects
- Nora Stanley – alto saxophone, tenor saxophone
- Paul Rigby – pedal steel guitar
- Nora O’Connor – vocals

=== Recording studios and engineers ===
British Columbia, Canada

- 8EAST (Vancouver) – JP Carter
- Afterlife Studios (Vancouver) – John Raham, assisted by Brendan Guy
- The Hive (Victoria) – Colin Stewart, additional engineering by Kathryn Calder
- Todd Fancey's house (Vancouver) – Todd Fancey
- Welcome to the Trailerdome (Galiano Island) – John Collins
- Unnamed studio (Vancouver) – David Carswell

United States

- Area 52 Studios (Saugerties, New York) – Dave Cook
- Carnassial Sound (St. Johnsbury, Vermont) – Jeff Galegher
- Creation Audio (Minneapolis, Minnesota) – John Fields
- Fidelitorium Recordings (Kernersville, North Carolina) – John Pfiffner
- Little Blue (Woodstock, New York) – A.C. Newman
- Monkhouse Studio (Mount Tremper, New York) – Zach Djanikian
- The Roost (Brooklyn, New York) – Nora Stanley
- Sikiyadigo (Chicago, Illinois) – Macie Stewart
- West Village Audio (Evanston, Illinois) – Nora O'Connor

=== Other technical and design personnel ===
- A.C. Newman – production (all tracks), mixing ("Wish You Could See Me I'm Killing It")
- Colin Stewart – mixing (except "Wish You Could See Me I'm Killing It" and "Bonus Mai Tais")
- John Collins – mixing ("Bonus Mai Tais")
- Matthew Barnhart – mastering at Chicago Mastering Service
- Michael Arthur – artwork
- Daniel Murphy – package design and layout

== Charts ==
Chart performance for The Former Site Of
| Chart (2026) | Peak position |
|---|---|
| UK Album Downloads (OCC) | 51 |
| UK Independent Albums Breakers (OCC) | 15 |
