= In the Morse Code of Brake Lights =

Studio album by the New Pornographers
- Released: September 27, 2019
- Genres: Power pop, indie pop, chamber pop
- Length: 41:02
- Label: Concord
- Producer: A. C. Newman

The New Pornographers chronology
Whiteout Conditions (2017)	In the Morse Code of Brake Lights (2019)	Continue as a Guest (2023)

Singles from In the Morse Code of Brake Lights
- 1. "Falling Down the Stairs of Your Smile" Released: August 2, 2019

In the Morse Code of Brake Lights is the eighth studio album by Canadian indie rock band the New Pornographers, released on September 27, 2019. The album was preceded in August by its lead single, "Falling Down the Stairs of Your Smile".

Following his absence from 2017's Whiteout Conditions, Dan Bejar‘s indefinite departure from the band was confirmed in the press release for this album. Nonetheless, he is listed as a co-composer on the track “Need Some Giants”.

== Critical response ==
Professional ratings
Aggregate scores
Source	Rating
Metacritic	78/100
Review scores
Source	Rating
AllMusic	4/5 stars
And It Don't Stop	B+
Exclaim!	7/10
Pitchfork	7.4/10
PopMatters	8/10
Rolling Stone	4/5 stars
Slant Magazine	3.5/5 stars

The album received generally positive reviews from critics. It has a score of 78 out of 100 on review aggregator website Metacritic. Daniel Sylvester of Exclaim! rated the album 7 out of 10, writing that "the fact that all 11 of the LP's songs were written by one person slightly hampers the album's sense of adventure, and [Neko] Case's phrasings no longer pop and stand out like they used to. Unfortunately, the octet's attempts to add musical flair to each song draws mixed reactions, as the synthetic strings of "Colossus of Rhodes" and "Leather on the Seat" give each song depth, but feel too high in the mix, to the point of distraction. But despite any nitpicky issues one may find with In the Morse Code of Brake Lights, it's refreshing to see the New Pornographers, 20 years into their existence, still trying to swing for the fences."

For Rolling Stone, Will Hermes gave the album four out of five stars: "the hooks and the lyrics are as sharp as ever, too, the latter functioning as part anxious messages-in-bottles, part baroque bubblegum life preservers. It’s panic-attack pop, fretting its way through vintage good-time chord changes, and letting us know we’re not alone."

== Track listing ==
All tracks are written by A. C. Newman except “Need Some Giants” by A.C. Newman and Dan Bejar.

No.	Title	Vocals	Length
1.	"You'll Need a Backseat Driver (Note: Also known as "You'll Need a New Backseat Driver")"	Neko Case, Newman	4:14
2.	"The Surprise Knock"	Newman	3:11
3.	"Falling Down the Stairs of Your Smile"	Newman, Case	3:44
4.	"Colossus of Rhodes"	Case	4:03
5.	"Higher Beams"	Newman	4:06
6.	"Dreamlike and On the Rush"	Newman	4:11
7.	"You Won't Need Those Where You're Going"	Newman	2:22
8.	"Need Some Giants"	Newman, Kathryn Calder	3:38
9.	"Opening Ceremony"	Newman	3:00
10.	"One Kind of Solomon"	Newman, Case	3:55
11.	"Leather On the Seat"	Case, Newman	4:33
Total length:			41:02

== Personnel ==
- A.C. Newman – vocals, guitar
- Neko Case – vocals
- John Collins – bass
- Blaine Thurier – keyboards, synthesizer
- Todd Fancey – lead guitar
- Kathryn Calder – vocals, keyboards, guitar
- Joe Seiders – drums, vocals
- Simi Stone – violin, vocals, percussion

== Charts ==
Chart (2019)	Peak position
US Billboard 200	144
US Top Rock Albums (Billboard)	26
