= The Slow Wonder =

Studio album by A. C. Newman
- Released: June 8, 2004
- Recorded: 2003
- Genre: Indie rock
- Length: 33:24
- Label: Matador, Last Gang
- Producer: A. C. Newman; John Collins; David Carswell

A. C. Newman chronology
The Slow Wonder (2004)	Get Guilty (2009)

The Slow Wonder is the debut solo album by A. C. Newman, who is better known as the frontman of The New Pornographers and Zumpano. It was released in 2004 on Matador Records and Last Gang Records.

== Reception ==
Professional ratings
Aggregate scores
Source	Rating
Metacritic	80/100
Review scores
Source	Rating
AllMusic	4.5/5 stars
Alternative Press	3/5
Drowned in Sound	9/10
Now	4/5
Paste	4/5 stars
Pitchfork	8.8/10
Q	3/5 stars
Rolling Stone	3/5 stars
Spin	A−
Uncut	4/5 stars

The Slow Wonder was met with generally positive reviews, with a Metacritic rating of 80 out of 100 based on 21 reviews. Brandon Stosuy of Pitchfork said the album "fits together for a taut 34 minutes without lags or rough spots" and could be "viewed as collection of singles." Tim Sendra of AllMusic wrote that standout tracks such as new wave sound of "Secretarial" combined with the sunny power pop of "Miracle Drug" or "On the Table" makes "[The Slow Wonder] essential". In another positive review, Rolling Stone said "Newman pens melodies that seem to have sprung from the collective unconscious and then encases them in bright, lush power-pop arrangements."

There were a handful of less than positive views on the album. Alternative Press said the album "sounded like demos" Newman was preparing for a future release. Although Anthony Miccio of The Village Voice wrote "uptempo grins like 'On the Table' make denying the pleasantness of it all impossible," he proceeded in criticizing it for just being "pop," and being "just something to zone out to."

The song "On the Table" was featured on the television program The O.C., and appeared on its official soundtrack.

== Track listing ==
1. "Miracle Drug" – 2:19
2. "Drink to Me, Babe, Then" – 3:32
3. "On the Table" – 3:57
4. "Most of Us Prizefighters" – 2:28
5. "The Battle for Straight Time" – 3:58
6. "Secretarial" – 2:35
7. "Come Crash" – 3:03
8. "Better Than Most" – 2:33
9. "The Cloud Prayer" – 2:28
10. "The Town Halo" – 3:11
11. "35 in the Shade" – 3:22
12. "Homemade Bombs in the Afternoon" (Japanese edition bonus track, Also available on iTunes)

== Personnel ==
Musicians

- A.C. Newman – vocals, guitars, bass, melodica, recorder, tambourine, drum programming (8)
- Shane Nelken – piano, autoharp
- Fisher Rose – drums (3, 5, 6, 10, 11)
- Pete Bourne – drums (1, 2, 4, 7, 9)
- Megan Bradfield – cello
- Shaun Brodie – trumpet
- Beau Wheeler (credited under dead-name) – vocals
- John Collins – bass
- David Carswell – ebow guitar

Production

- John Collins - production
- Howard Redekopp - mixing
