= Palace at 4 A.M. (disambiguation) =

The Palace at 4 a.m. is a 1932 surrealist sculpture by Alberto Giacometti.

Palace at 4 A.M. may also refer to:

- The Palace at 4 a.m. (Part I), a 2002 album by Jay Bennett and Edward Burch
- The Palace at 4 A.M., a 1972 play by Howard Moss
- "The Palace at Four A.M.", a 1983 short story by Donald Barthelme
- Palace at 4 A.M., a 2005 art installation by Jon Kessler
- "The Palace at 4 AM", a 2009 song by A. C. Newman

== See also ==
- Palace (disambiguation)
