= Frontrunner (album) =

Studio album by Frontperson
- Released: September 21, 2018
- Recorded: 2017
- Studio: National Music Centre (Calgary, Alberta); The Hive (Vancouver Island, British Columbia)
- Genre: Indie pop; folk
- Length: 34:30
- Label: Oscar St.
- Producer: Colin Stewart

Frontperson chronology
Frontrunner (2018)	Parade (2022)

Singles from Frontrunner
- 1. "Tick-Tock (Frontrunner)" Released: July 9, 2018; 2. "Young Love" Released: September 4, 2018; 3. "Long Night" Released: September 17, 2018

Frontrunner is the debut studio album by Frontperson, a Canadian duo consisting of Kathryn Calder (the New Pornographers) and Mark Andrew Hamilton (Woodpigeon). It was released on September 21, 2018, on Calder's label Oscar St. Records and was produced by Colin Stewart. Led with the singles "Tick-Tock (Frontrunner)", "Young Love", and "Long Night", it was met with positive reception from critics, who described it as indie pop and folk music.

== Background and recording ==
Frontperson is a Canadian duo consisting of Kathryn Calder of the New Pornographers and Mark Andrew Hamilton of Woodpigeon. The two met in a recording studio in 2015, and during casual conversation, they expressed a mutual interest to create a record together. The next year, they began trading songs, and by 2017, they recorded at the National Music Centre in Calgary, Alberta with producer Colin Stewart. They also recorded at The Hive, a studio in Vancouver Island, British Columbia operated by the producer. Stewart is married to Calder and has separately collaborated with both her and Woodpigeon.

One of the last songs completed for the record was "Young Love". Calder has said that it finally started to take shape when she and Hamilton, taking inspiration from early-career Leonard Cohen, simultaneously played their guitars in a single microphone, creating a lo-fi feeling that they were satisfied with. John Leimseider, who once played keyboards for Iron Butterfly and curated a keyboard collection at the National Music Centre, makes a guest appearance on "Postcards from a Posh Man".

The album's title was inspired by a photograph by Ambrose Fan, depicting a young girl with clenched fists waiting to begin a race at a track and field event. The photograph, which ultimately became the front cover of the record, had been given to Hamilton by Fan roughly twenty years prior. Hamilton said that once Frontperson had begun recording at the National Music Centre, he placed it on the "recording console" for two weeks, using it as inspiration for how the record should sound.

== Composition ==
Frontrunner has been described by critics as indie pop and folk. Hamilton told Billboard that his original idea was to make a dance record whereas Calder wanted more of a folk album, resulting in "something that's at times neither of those things and at times both of those things". Instrumentally, the more acoustic aspects are often counterbalanced with synthesizers and drum machines. The track "Tick-Tock (Frontrunner)", one of the record's more upbeat songs, features Calder and Hamilton trading vocals in a call-and-response fashion. On "He Follows Me", Hamilton delivers blunt lyrics that deal with the anguish experienced from anonymous hookups. According to Calder, the lyrics on "Young Love" were her attempt to encapsulate the more certain and uncertain aspects of the early days of a relationship.

== Singles and release ==
Three singles preceded Frontrunner. Alongside the announcement for the album, the first single, "Tick-Tock (Frontrunner)", was released on July 9, 2018, with a music video directed by Rob Leickner and Ryan Sudds. Inspired by the photograph on the album cover, the video was shot in 2018 in British Columbia at the Langley Pacific Invitational and the BC Masters Track & Field Championships. It features reverse footage of athletes.

On September 4, "Young Love" followed as the second single. For the accompanying music video, director Lorenz Tröbinger said that before he had even heard the song, he thought to approach it from his own personal experiences, rather than the musicians'. At the time of filming, he and his boyfriend James—who both star in the video—had mutually decided to end their relationship because Tröbinger was moving away from London the next week, and the video was intended to be a tribute to their time together.

The third single, "Long Night", was released on September 17 with a music video starring artist Tranna Wintour. Hamilton, who knew about Wintour as a public figure in Montreal and for her contributions to the LGBTQ community, suggested her to Calder. Frontrunner was released on September 21, just four days later, via Calder's label Oscar St. Records.

== Critical reception ==
Professional ratings
Review scores
Source	Rating
AllMusic	4/5 stars
Bust	4/5
God Is in the TV	7/10
Paste	7.2/10
Spill Magazine	4/5 stars

Editors at AllMusic rated Frontrunner four stars out of five, with reviewer Timothy Monger saying while the record isn't one that "necessarily scream[s] for your attention", it rewards listeners through the quality of the songwriting, its subtle changes, and numerous nuances. They highlighted "Long Night" and "Young Love" as examples of when the duo were at their best, calling both songs "dark-toned indie pop gems with an enchanted feel". Paste's Eric R. Danton, giving the album a score of 7.2 out of 10, said that even though "there's nothing ... exceptionally daring" about the material, the album contains "moments of real beauty" in songs like "He Follows Me" and "Shorter Days". Danton thought the biggest appeal of the record was the duo's vocals, both individually and how they complement the other.

Steve Spithray of God Is in the TV, rating it seven out of ten, praised Frontrunner as an authentic modern-day folk record and said it possessed "a striking fragility" at its most gentle, which they consider to be a crucial factor for such a musical duo. In Spill Magazine, Johnny Owen gave the record four stars out of five and highlighted its "quieter moments". They also said that Calder and Hamilton's vocals were "intimate in their imperfection" individually and blended "extremely well" together, but as a criticism, Spithray thought it was more effective when Calder harmonized over Hamilton than the inverse.

Under the Radar ranked Frontrunner at number 80 on its list of the "Top 100 Albums of 2018".

== Track listing ==
All tracks are written by Kathryn Calder and Mark Andrew Hamilton.

Frontrunner track listing
No.	Title	Length
1.	"U.O.I."	4:42
2.	"Long Night"	3:50
3.	"Tick-Tock (Frontrunner)"	3:43
4.	"He Follows Me"	5:49
5.	"Young Love"	4:08
6.	"Shorter Days"	3:40
7.	"This City Is Mine"	2:38
8.	"Postcards from a Posh Man"	3:05
9.	"Insight"	2:51
Total length:		34:30

== Personnel ==
Except where noted, musical credits are adapted from Frontperson's AllMusic biography, and technical and design credits are adapted from the CD liner notes.

=== Frontperson ===
- Kathryn Calder – vocals
- Mark Andrew Hamilton – vocals

=== Additional musicians ===
- Clea Foofat – cello
- Melissa McWilliams – drums
- Jen Sévertson – bass
- Marek Tyler – percussion
- Foon Yap – violin
- John Leimseider – guest appearance on "Postcards from a Posh Man"

=== Technical and design ===
- Colin Stewart – production, engineering, mixing
- Jason Tawkin – additional engineering at the National Music Centre
- Kathryn Calder – additional engineering at The Hive
- Stuart McKillop – mastering at Rain City Recorders
- Bergþóra Jónsdóttir – design
- Ambrose Fan – cover photograph
- Eva Blue – additional photography
- Marie-Lyne Quirion – additional photography
