= Low Self-Esteem Girl =

- Directed by: Blaine Thurier
- Written by: Blaine Thurier
- Produced by: Jody Franklin; Aaron Lake
- Starring: Corrina Hammond; Rob McBeth; Ted Dave
- Cinematography: Blaine Thurier
- Edited by: Blaine Thurier
- Production company: Blue Curtain Productions
- Release date: February 17, 2000
- Running time: 96 minutes
- Country: Canada
- Language: English

Low Self-Esteem Girl is a 2000 Canadian comedy-drama film, directed by Blaine Thurier. Shot on digital video for a budget of less than $10,000, the film stars Corrina Hammond as Lois, a naive woman with low self-esteem who gets drawn into unusual situations because of her overly trusting nature.

The film premiered in February 2000 at Blinding Light, an independent theatre in the Gastown district of Vancouver.

The film is noted for including musicians Carl Newman and Dan Bejar, Thurier's bandmates in The New Pornographers, and Jason Zumpano in supporting roles. The film's screening at the 2000 Toronto International Film Festival enabled The New Pornographers to play their first show in Toronto, several weeks in advance of the release of their debut album Mass Romantic.

The film received a nomination from the Vancouver Film Critics Circle for Best Off-Indie Film at the Vancouver Film Critics Circle Awards 2000. It subsequently screened at the 2001 SXSW festival, where it won the Jury Award for Best Narrative Feature.
