= Challengers (album) =

Studio album by the New Pornographers
- Released: August 21, 2007
- Recorded: 2006–2007
- Studios: The Seaside Lounge, Brooklyn, U.S.
- Genres: Indie rock, power pop, baroque pop
- Length: 48:17
- Labels: Matador (U.S.); Last Gang Records (Canada)
- Producers: Phil Palazzolo, John Collins, A. C. Newman

The New Pornographers chronology
| Twin Cinema (2005) | Challengers (2007) | Together (2010) |

Professional ratings
Aggregate scores
| Source | Rating |
|---|---|
| Metacritic | 74/100 |
Review scores
| Source | Rating |
| AllMusic | 4/5 stars |
| The A.V. Club | A− |
| Entertainment Weekly | B− |
| The Guardian | 3/5 stars |
| MSN Music (Consumer Guide) | B+ |
| NME | 8/10 |
| Pitchfork | 6.0/10 |
| Q | 4/5 stars |
| Rolling Stone | 3/5 stars |
| Spin | 3.5/5 stars |

Challengers is the fourth studio album by Canadian indie rock band the New Pornographers, released on August 21, 2007. The track listing for the album was revealed June 1, 2007. A box set containing three blank CD-Rs, named "Executive Edition", was released August 7, 2007, two weeks before the album, with the promise of future multimedia to be downloaded at the band's website for fans to compile and burn their own CDs. The first disc included B-sides, demos and alternate versions; the second, titled "Live from the Future", featured live performances of songs related to the album; the third disc includes videos, photos and album artwork. The bonus material was available for download with the pre-orders of Challengers. "Failsafe" is an A.C. Newman song first recorded commercially by the Canadian indie pop band the Choir Practice, and appeared on their debut album several months before the release of Challengers.

Challengers debuted at number 34 on the U.S. Billboard 200, selling about 20,000 copies in its first week. "Myriad Harbour" was #79 on Rolling Stone's list of the 100 Best Songs of 2007. As of 2010 it has sold 109,000 copies in US and 16,000 copies in Canada.

== Track listing ==
All songs were written by A. C. Newman, except where noted.

| No. | Title | Vocals | Length |
|---|---|---|---|
| 1. | "My Rights Versus Yours" | Newman | 4:14 |
| 2. | "All the Old Showstoppers" | Newman | 4:07 |
| 3. | "Challengers" | Neko Case | 3:29 |
| 4. | "Myriad Harbour" (Dan Bejar) | Bejar | 3:55 |
| 5. | "All the Things That Go to Make Heaven and Earth" | Newman | 3:06 |
| 6. | "Failsafe" | Kathryn Calder | 2:36 |
| 7. | "Unguided" | Newman (bridge: Calder) | 6:30 |
| 8. | "Entering White Cecilia" (Bejar) | Bejar | 3:26 |
| 9. | "Go Places" | Case | 4:27 |
| 10. | "Mutiny, I Promise You" | Newman | 4:09 |
| 11. | "Adventures in Solitude" | Newman, Calder | 4:14 |
| 12. | "The Spirit of Giving" (Bejar) | Bejar | 4:00 |

=== Vinyl edition ===
The vinyl release adjusts the running order slightly, swapping the positions of two tracks so that "Unguided" closes side one and "Failsafe" starts side two rather than the other way around.

==== Side one ====
1. "My Rights Versus Yours" – 4:14
2. "All the Old Showstoppers" – 4:07
3. "Challengers" – 3:29
4. "Myriad Harbour" (Bejar) – 3:55
5. "All the Things That Go to Make Heaven and Earth" – 3:06
6. "Unguided" – 6:30

==== Side two ====
1. "Failsafe" – 2:36
2. "Entering White Cecilia" (Bejar) – 3:26
3. "Go Places" – 4:27
4. "Mutiny, I Promise You" – 4:09
5. "Adventures in Solitude" – 4:14
6. "The Spirit of Giving" (Bejar) – 4:00

=== Executive Edition ===
Complete sets of Challengers Executive Edition are extremely rare. The Executive Edition was a limited edition 3-disc complement to the original release, which customers could put together to create a 4-disc set, but they had to build it themselves in 2007-2008 using a download code. The box-set came as three blank CD-Rs with branded packaging and labels. Using the code that came with the set, customers could download the additional music (as lossless FLAC files) and videos and create the three additional discs. Matador has since discontinued the download site. As a result, the only way to get the Executive Edition today is to find a used copy with the downloaded files burned to the CD-R. If you find a new, unopened copy, you will basically be purchasing three fancy, blank CD-Rs.

When complete, the three discs fit into the case along with the original release, making a four-CD set of the original release of Challengers plus a disc of b-sides and alternate mixes, a disc of live music (from Challengers and other New Pornographers albums), and a disc of videos and photos.

==== Disc two ====
The second disc contains B-sides, demos and alternate mixes.

1. "The Speed of Luxury" – 3:28 (Released July 6, 2007)
2. "Silent Systems" – 4:06 (Released August 3, 2007)
3. "Fortune" – 4:20 (Released August 28, 2007)
4. "Failsafe" (demo) – 2:31 (Released September 11, 2007)
5. "Showstoppers" (demo) – 4:07 (Released September 11, 2007)
6. "Myriad Harbour" (demo) – 3:47 (Released September 11, 2007)
7. "Go Places" (Lite Mix) – 4:28 (Released September 25, 2007)
8. "Fugue State" – 3:55 (Released November 21, 2007)
9. "Arms of Mary/Looking At A Baby" – 3:51 (Released November 27, 2007)
10. "Joseph, Who Understood" – 3:00 (Released November 27, 2007)

"Silent Systems" and "Fortune" were also included as bonus tracks on the Japanese edition of the album.

==== Disc three ====
The third disc, titled Live from the Future, was released on January 10, 2008.

1. "My Rights versus Yours" – 4:06
2. "Use It" – 3:23
3. "Myriad Harbour" – 3:56
4. "Challengers" – 3:47
5. "All the Old Showstoppers" – 4:12
6. "Mass Romantic" – 3:54
7. "Failsafe" – 2:37
8. "Electric Version" – 2:52
9. "Unguided" – 6:22
10. "Adventures in Solitude" – 4:33
11. "Jackie" (mislabeled as "Jackie, Dressed in Cobras") – 2:42
12. "Go Places" – 4:53

==== Disc four ====
The fourth disc contains Challengers videos and photos; it was released in October and November 2007.

1. "Challengers" music video (Released October 12, 2007)
2. "Myriad Harbour" music video

Plus multiple folders of photos from various locations in the Challengers Tour.

== Personnel ==
- A. C. Newman – vocals, guitar, piano, Wurlitzer, Casio, mandolin, percussion, bass, bass melodion
- Blaine Thurier – Fender Rhodes, sampler
- Dan Bejar – vocals, shakers, guitar, piano
- John Collins – bass, baritone guitar, glockenspiel, mandolin, guitars, Casio, tambourine
- Kathryn Calder – vocals, piano, Wurlitzer
- Kurt Dahle – drums, vocals, percussion
- Neko Case – vocals
- Todd Fancey – guitars, banjo, mandolin

=== Guest musicians ===
- Alan Hampton – double bass
- Benjamin D. Calb – cello
- Brendan Ryan – accordion, French horn, trumpet
- Eileen Gannon – harp
- Leslie Kubicka – flute, piccolo
- Marla Hansen – viola
- Olivier Manchon – violin
- Phil Palazzolo – guitar
- Tara Szczygielski – violin

=== Production ===
- Phil Palazzolo - Producer/Mixer
- John Collins - Producer
- A. C. Newman - Producer
- Howard Redekopp - Mixer

== Charts ==
Chart performance
| Chart (2007) | Peak position |
|---|---|
| Canadian Albums (Nielsen SoundScan) | 20 |
| UK Albums (Official Charts) | 156 |
| UK Independent Albums (Official Charts) | 13 |
| US Billboard 200 | 34 |
| US Independent Albums (Billboard) | 4 |
| US Indie Store Album Sales (Billboard) | 4 |
| US Top Alternative Albums (Billboard) | 10 |
| US Top Rock Albums (Billboard) | 10 |
