= Throwing stars =

Throwing stars may refer to:

- Shuriken, a traditional Japanese concealed weapon that was used for throwing, and sometimes stabbing
- "Throwing Stars," a song by Zumpano from their 1996 album Goin' Through Changes
- Throwing Stars, a 2007 film starring Scott Grimes and Jason London
