= Kathryn Calder =

Canadian indie rock musician

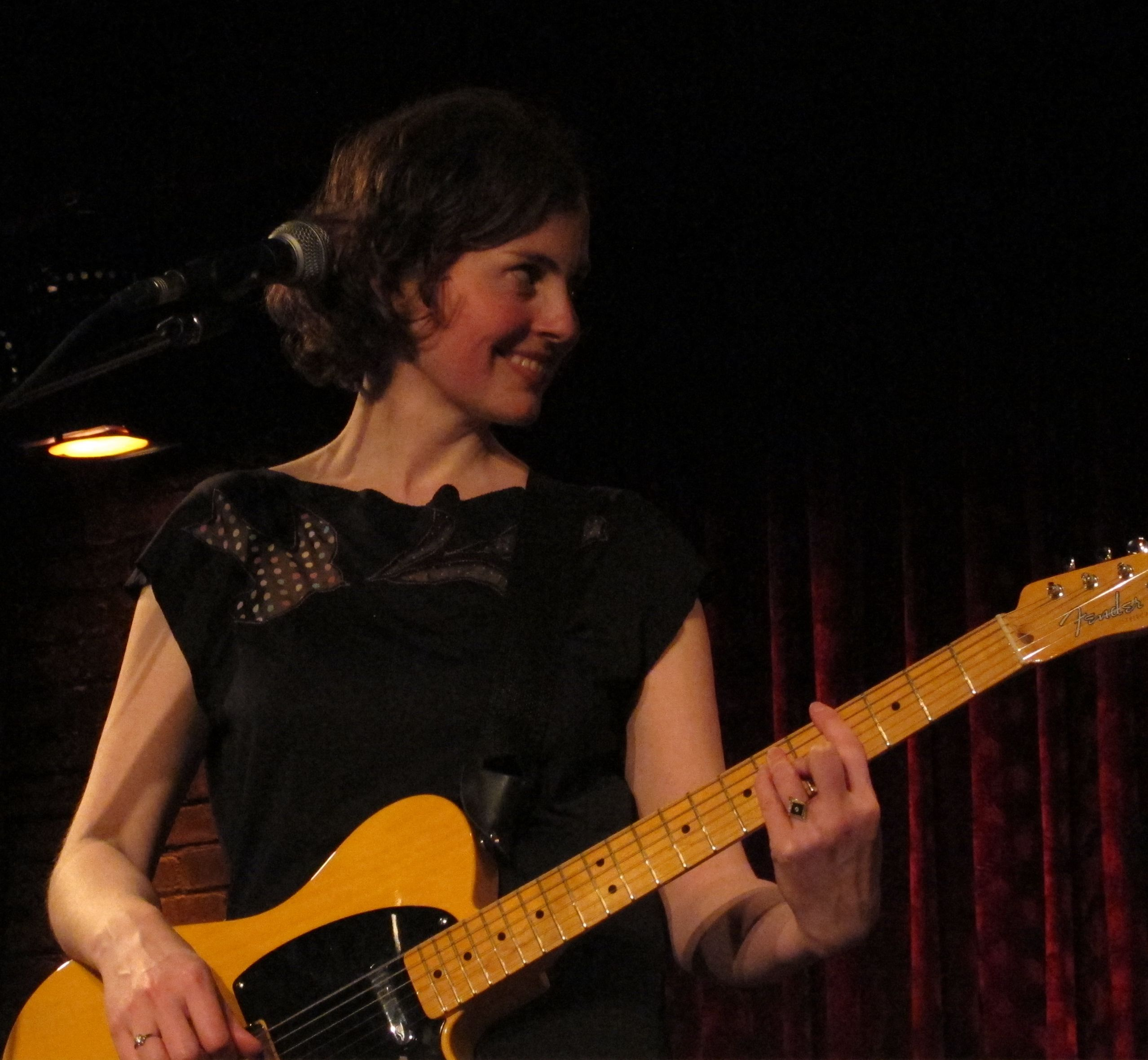
- Kathryn Calder at a solo show in 2011

Background information
- Born: June 17, 1982 (age 44)
- Origin: Victoria, British Columbia, Canada
- Instruments: Vocals; keyboards; accordion; guitar
- Years active: 2003–present
- Labels: Mint; Matador; Last Gang; File Under: Music
- Member of: The New Pornographers; Frontperson
- Formerly of: Immaculate Machine
- Spouse: Colin Stewart

Kathryn Jane Calder (born June 17, 1982) is a Canadian indie rock musician, who performs as a solo artist, and is a member of the bands the New Pornographers and Frontperson. She is a former member of Immaculate Machine. Calder started with the New Pornographers by filling in for Neko Case for live performances and was made a permanent member in 2006.

== Career ==
Calder was a member of Immaculate Machine from 2003 to 2011, releasing three albums and an EP with them.

Her first solo album, Are You My Mother?, was released on August 3, 2010 (Canada) and August 10, 2010 (United States), with a digital release date of June 28, 2010. The album was named after the children's book with the same name. It was recorded when Calder was caring for her sick mother, and the project was put on hold when her mother died of Lou Gehrig's disease. The New Pornographers' 2010 release Together is dedicated to the memory of Calder's mother.

Calder released her second album, Bright and Vivid on October 25, 2011. Superchunk drummer Jon Wurster, Jesse Zubot and Ford Pier are some of the guests on the album. The album was named as a longlisted nominee for the 2012 Polaris Music Prize on June 14, 2012.

In July 2012, Calder accepted an offer for a documentary about her life, called A Matter of Time. It was produced by the Yellow Bird Project and released in 2016. The movie touches on how she met Newman and her mother's death from ALS, as well as including some live performances from the New Pornographers, Immaculate Machine, and Calder herself as a solo artist.

Calder donated her vocals to the end credits song from the film, A Dog Named Gucci, in the song "One Voice", which also features Norah Jones, Aimee Mann, Susanna Hoffs, Lydia Loveless, Neko Case, and Brian May. It was produced by Dean Falcone, who also wrote the film's score. "One Voice" was released on Record Store Day, April 16, 2016, with profits from the sale of the single going to benefit animal charities.

In 2018, Calder formed the band Frontperson alongside Mark Andrew Hamilton of the band Woodpigeon, releasing the album Frontrunner that year. Parade, the duo's second album, was released in April 2022.

In 2019, Calder became the artist in residence for the City of Victoria.

== Personal life ==
Calder is the niece of fellow the New Pornographers member Carl Newman. Calder explained in a 2007 interview: "My mom was adopted as a baby and about ten years ago she found her birth family and Carl is in her birth family. At that time I was a teenager and playing in a band and didn't really know I had that family ... so that's how I met Carl."

She is married to record producer Colin Stewart.

== Discography ==
=== Solo ===
- Are You My Mother? (File Under: Music, 2010)
- Bright and Vivid (File Under: Music, 2011)
- Kathryn Calder (File Under: Music, 2015)

=== With Immaculate Machine ===
- Transporter (independent, 2004)
- Ones and Zeros (Mint, 2005)
- Immaculate Machine's Fables (Mint, 2007)
- High on Jackson Hill (Mint, 2009)

=== With the New Pornographers ===
- Twin Cinema (CA: Mint; US & EU: Matador, 2005)
- Challengers (CA: Last Gang; US & EU: Matador, 2007)
- Together (CA: Last Gang; US: Matador, 2010)
- Brill Bruisers (CA: Last Gang; US: Matador, 2014)
- Whiteout Conditions (CA: Dine Alone; US: Concord, 2017)
- In the Morse Code of Brake Lights (Concord, 2019)
- Continue as a Guest (Merge, 2023)
- The Former Site Of (Merge, 2026)

=== With Frontperson ===
- Frontrunner (Oscar St., 2018)
- Parade (Oscar St., 2022)
