= Continue as a Guest =

Studio album by the New Pornographers
- Released: March 31, 2023
- Studio: Multiple locations in Canada and the United States
- Genre: Indie rock
- Length: 41:00
- Label: Merge
- Producer: A. C. Newman

The New Pornographers chronology
In the Morse Code of Brake Lights (2019)	Continue as a Guest (2023)	The Former Site Of (2026)

Singles from Continue as a Guest
- 1. "Really Really Light" Released: January 9, 2023; 2. "Angelcover" Released: February 16, 2023; 3. "Pontius Pilate's Home Movies" Released: March 7, 2023

Continue as a Guest is the ninth studio album by indie rock group the New Pornographers, released on March 31, 2023. It has received positive reviews from critics and has been promoted with several single releases and a tour. This is also the last album to feature drummer Joe Seiders before his firing from the band in 2025.

== Background and recording ==
Continue as a Guest was recorded during the COVID-19 pandemic, requiring band leader and album producer A. C. Newman to work virtually with his bandmates and rely on them recording in other studios and only occasionally recording in-person with fellow musicians. His process included listening to earlier albums by the band backwards and also interpolating unreleased tracks to make new songs out of them, resulting in a co-writing credit for former band member Dan Bejar. This is the first release by the New Pornographers to feature outside songwriters, with Newman collaborating with Sadie Dupuis via Twitter and also includes Philadelphia-based saxophonist Zach Djanikian, whom Newman was introduced to by some comedian friends. On this album, principal songwriter Newman sought to expand the band's sound, incorporating both the polished pop music that they are known for as well as more "angular" and "almost abrasive" elements to their style. The music explores the loneliness and isolation of the pandemic, as well as feelings of boredom and media overload. Continue as a Guest marks the band's debut for Merge Records.

== Promotion and singles ==
In 2023, the album was preceded by the singles "Really Really Light" on January 9, "Angelcover" on February 16, and "Pontius Pilate's Home Movies" on March 7. The band also embarked on a concert tour, following shows they played in late 2022. Shortly after releasing the album, they announced an expanded 2023 tour spanning the U.S. and Canada, starting on April 19 in Asheville, North Carolina at the Salvage Station and ending on November 18 in Salt Lake City, Utah at The Commonwealth. The bands Wild Pink and Finom were scheduled to support.

== Critical reception ==
Professional ratings
Aggregate scores
Source	Rating
AnyDecentMusic?	7.2/10
Metacritic	76/100
Review scores
Source	Rating
AllMusic	4/5 stars
Exclaim!	7/10
Hot Press	9/10
The Line of Best Fit	8/10
MusicOMH	4/5 stars
Pitchfork	6.8/10
PopMatters	7/10
Slant	4/5 stars
Under the Radar	7.5/10

Continue as a Guest received positive reviews from critics noted at review aggregator Metacritic. It has a weighted average score of 76 out of 100, based on 16 reviews. Summing up 16 reviews, editors of AnyDecentMusic? rated this album a 7.2 out of 10.

In Rolling Stone, Jon Dolan opined that the album "delivers its vivid emotional payoff in subtle gestures". Ian Gormley of Exclaim! rated the album a seven out of 10, writing that the band's songwriting has matured and "this is the first of their records that seems to want listeners to marinate in the vibe, if only for one quick moment, before moving on to the next three-minute dopamine hit". For PopMatters, Chris Conlon gave the same score and praised the band for trying out new sounds while "Newman's melodies are as strong as ever, and the three main vocalists sound great". Slant's Jeremy Winogard gave the album four out of five stars for principal songwriter A. C. Newman's experimentation and "more insular tone" on the lyrics. In Glide Magazine, Jeremy Lukens noted a theme of the breakdown of society due to the COVID-19 pandemic and a theme of a "desire to live as an outsider apart from the rest of the world" that is combined with music that includes "swirling keyboards and electronic bloops" that is "still highly analog". Writing for Beats Per Minute, Carlo Thomas rated continue as a guest 67%, praising Newman's growth as a songwriter, but noting that "most of the time, the tone shift on Continue as a Guest comes at the cost of the band's core appeal—their sense of fun—without a compelling replacement".

John Walshie of Hot Press scored this release a nine out of 10, opining that there is "not a weak song here, as the Canadians deliver a career high". The Line of Best Fit rated Continue as a Guest an eight out of 10, with Craig Howieson noting a theme of carpe diem, with the band "surging forward unperturbed by the passing of time or by what has come before". Mariel Fechik of Under the Radar scored the release a 7.5 out of 10, noting the joy the band takes in discussing depressing or mundane themes. John Murphy of MusicOMH rated Continue as a Guest four out of five stars, characterizing it as "another reliable chapter in the Canadians' storied career", but not "their most immediate album though – it takes several plays for these song's delights to fully reveal themself". Pitchfork's Ian Cohen scored this release a 6.8 out of 10, noting the strength of Newman's perspective as a songwriter, but complained that "they once tapped into the big, sloppy emotions of pop music without succumbing to its obviousness" and that the band's performances have suffered with the loss of drummer Kurt Dahle. Editors of AllMusic gave this album four out of five stars, with critic Timothy Monger characterizing the music, "the band's inherent sense of craft gives even their moodiest cuts a sense of play and, at times, even mischief" and noting that while this lacks the immediacy of some previous albums by the group, but "it succeeds more subtly on its own terms and begs for repeated listens".

In Under the Radar, Mark Redfern named "Angelcover" one of the top 10 songs of the week. The publication also listed "Pontius Pilate's Home Movies" once it was released a single. KCMP named Continue as a Guest the Album of the Week on March 20.

In a mid-year review, Rolling Stone India included this release in their best albums of 2023. Critics at Rolling Stone included this among the 40 best indie rock albums of 2023. At Under the Radar, this was rated the 98th best album of 2023.

== Track listing ==
All songs written by A. C. Newman, except where noted.

1. "Really Really Light" (Newman and Dan Bejar) – 3:21
2. "Pontius Pilate's Home Movies" – 3:54
3. "Cat and Mouse with the Light" – 3:59
4. "Last and Beautiful" – 4:17
5. "Continue as a Guest" – 4:24
6. "Bottle Episodes" – 4:12
7. "Marie and the Undersea" – 4:42
8. "Angelcover" – 3:30
9. "Firework in the Falling Snow" (Newman and Sadie Dupuis) – 3:21
10. "Wish Automatic Suite" – 5:20

== Personnel ==
The New Pornographers

- Neko Case – vocals (lead except on "Really Really Light" and "Firework in the Falling Snow")
- Kathryn Calder – keyboards, vocals (lead on "Really Really Light"), engineering
- John Collins – bass guitar, guitar, keyboards, engineering
- Todd Fancey – guitar, engineering
- A. C. Newman – vocals (lead except on "Cat and Mouse with the Light" and "Marie and the Undersea"), guitar, bass guitar, keyboards, recording, mixing on "Cat and Mouse with the Light", additional mixing on all other tracks; production
- Joe Seiders – drums, vocals, engineering

Additional personnel

- Matthew Barnhart – mastering at Chicago Mastering Service, Chicago, Illinois, United States
- Pete Caigan – recording assistance
- Amy Casey – cover
- Zach Djanikian – tenor saxophone, soprano saxophone, guitar, bass guitar, engineering
- Lee Falco – recording assistance
- Jeff Galegher – engineering
- D. James Goodwin – engineering
- Pete Hanlon – mixing on all tracks except "Cat and Mouse with the Light"
- Daniel Murphy – design, layout
- Paul Rigby – pedal steel guitar

Recording locations

- The Building, Marlboro, New York, United States (Hanlon and Newman, assisted by Falco)
- Carnaissal Sound, Saint Johnsbury, Vermont, United States (engineered by Jeff Gelegher)
- Todd Fancey's house (engineered by Fancey)
- Flymax, Woodstock, New York, United States (Hanlon and Newman, assisted by Caigan)
- The Hive, Victoria, British Columbia, Canada (engineered by Calder)
- The Isokon, Woodstock, New York, United States (engineered by Goodwin)
- Little Blue, Woodstock, New York, United States (Newman)
- Moonlight Lane, Woodstock, New York, United States (Hanlon and Newman)
- Monkhouse Studio, Mount Tremper, New York, United States (engineered by Djanikian)
- Ocotillo Sound, Palm Desert, California, United States (engineered by Seiders)
- Welcome to the Trailerdome, Galiano Island, British Columbia, Canada (engineered by Collins)

== See also ==
- 2023 in Canadian music
