= Martin & Muñoz =

Walter Martin & Paloma Muñoz, also known as Martin & Muñoz are artists who collaborate to create dystopian sculptures and large photographic works often based on dioramas.

== Biography ==
Walter Martin was born in Norfolk, Virginia in 1953. He received his B.A. from Old Dominion University in Virginia and his M.F.A. from Virginia Commonwealth University.

Paloma Muñoz was born in Madrid, Spain in 1965. She received her M.A. from Malmö University, Sweden. She is the daughter of Spanish artist Paloma Navares and sister of film maker and producer David Muñoz.

Martin and Muñoz have been professional and personal partners since soon after they met in 1993. They live in Milford, Pennsylvania and maintain a studio in Williamsburg, Brooklyn. They work summers at a family retreat in Spain

== Work ==
Walter Martin & Paloma Muñoz are best known for their sculptures and photographs contrasting pristine settings with foreboding scenes infused with liberal doses of gallows humor. In their work they explore the human condition, dystopias and alienation. They focus on the multiple narratives implied in a captured moment. Their most popular works are the Travelers snow globes and large photographs. Of these Ken Johnson wrote: "Like fairy tales or dreams, the tiny tableaus work as psychological metaphors: specifically, a stage everyone is bound to enter when life has lost its warmth and promise, at which point finding a new way becomes desperately urgent". Art critic Carlo McCormick considered their snow globes and derived photographs "a medium of futurity": "The magic here is very much about the premonitory, a way of tapping into the globe as a kind of fortune-teller's crystal ball. The cryptic misfortunes, the intimations of mortality, the panoramic tableaux of misadventure, bad luck, and wrong decisions, are all ultimately a medium of futurity..."

Some of their other projects include Blind House, Spheres and A Cure for All Remedies and Other Short Stories. Curator Dan Cameron has complemented the artists on their ability to juggle both visual and psychological charges: "At the same time that they produce riddle-like parables about modern existence, they do not shirk the artist's obligation to invent a new formulation of tactile and even sensual pleasure."

Martin & Muñoz were commissioned in 2001 by the Arts and Design program of New York City's Metropolitan Transportation Authority to create a permanent installation for the Canal Street Station on the A, C and E trains. Their installation, titled "A Gathering", consists of 181 black bronze birds perched throughout the station. The birds can be found on the token booth, railings, and beams throughout mezzanine.

Aperture Foundation published a monograph of their work with a short story written by Jonathan Lethem, who was inspired by their work.

Martin & Muñoz provided the cover and interior art for the New Pornographers' album Together.

Martin & Muñoz started using augmented reality (AR) technology in 2020 to create and place virtual works, based on their snow globes, in their exhibitions and in user's environments. Their first AR work was presented at the Cervantes Institute in New York in early 2022. The exhibition catalogue for the Fairy Tales (2023) exhibition at QAGOMA in Brisbane, Australia, featured their augmented reality works and the first pop-up 3D AR artworks ever published in a book.

== Selected exhibitions ==
- 2023, "Fairy Tales", QAGOMA, Brisbane, Australia
- 2022, "The Houses Are Blind, but the Trees Can See", Cervantes Institute, New York, NY, USA
- 2019, "A Mind of Winter", Museum der Moderne Rupertinum, Salzburg, Austria
- 2019, "Blind House: Utopia and Dystopia in the Age of Radical Transparency", Institute for the Humanities, Ann Arbor, MI
- 2018, "Esferas", Centro de Arte Contemporaneo Tomás y Valiente, Madrid, Spain
- 2017, "Snowbound", Cheekwood Botanical Garden and Museum of Art, Nashville, TN
- 2017, "The Times", The FLAG Art Foundation, New York, NY
- 2015, "Cross-Pollination", Great Hall at the Institute of Fine Art, New York, NY
- 2014, "Disturbing Innocence", curated by Eric Fischl, The FLAG Art Foundation, New York, NY
- 2012, "Martin & Muñoz", Virginia MOCA, Virginia Beach, VA
- 2012, "Night Falls", P.P.O.W Gallery, New York, NY
- 2011, "White Nights", Institute for the Humanities at the University of Michigan, Ann Arbor, MI
- 2011, "Otherworldly", curated by David Revere McFadden, Museum of Arts and Design, NY
- 2009, "Walter Martin & Paloma Muñoz: Wayward Bound", John Michael Kohler Arts Center, Sheboygan, WI
- 2008, "Buried 'till Spring", Galeria Isabel Hurley, Málaga, Spain
- 2008, "Objects and Photographs", Bentley Gallery, Scottsdale, AZ.
- 2008, "Islands", P.P.O.W, New York, NY
- 2007, "Photographs", Cerealart Project Room, Philadelphia, PA
- 2007, "Secrets Sleep In Winter Clothes", MAM Mario Mauroner Contemporary Art, Vienna, Austria
- 2007, "White Out", ARCO Projects, Madrid, Spain
- 2005, "Cold Front", P.P.O.W Gallery, New York, NY
- 2004, "The Frigid Zone", Mario Mauroner Contemporary Art, Salzburg, Austria
- 2004, "Travelers", Museo de la Universidad de Alicante, Spain
- 2004, "Travelers", Rhona Hoffman Gallery, Chicago, IL
- 2003, "Travelers", P·P·O·W, New York, NY
- 2003, "Travelers", Moriarty Gallery, Madrid, Spain
- 2001, "A Gathering", a permanent installation of 181 bronze birds at Canal Street Station on the A, C and E lines, New York, NY
- 2001, P·P·O·W, New York, NY
- 2000, "Loss of Experience", Santa Barbara Contemporary Arts Forum, Santa Barbara, CA
- 1999, "Dis", Momenta, Brooklyn, New York
- 1999, Espacio Caja Burgos, Burgos, Spain
- 1998, P·P·O·W, New York, NY
- 1997, Alejandro Sales Gallery, Barcelona, Spain
- 1996, P·P·O·W, New York, NY
- 1996, Moriarty Gallery, Madrid, Spain
- 1994, P·P·O·W, New York, NY

== Collections ==
Their work is in the collections of many prominent museums, including the Museum of Contemporary Art Kiasma in Helsinki the Museum der Moderne Salzburg in Austria, the Centro de Arte Contemporaneo de Málaga, Spain, the Museo Nacional Centro de Arte Reina Sofía in Madrid and the Hunter Museum of American Art in Chattanooga, TN. They are also represented in the private collections of other prominent institutions, including the Progressive Art Collection, Bloomberg L.P. and 21c Museum Hotel in Louisville, KT.
