= Matador at Fifteen =

Compilation album by Various
- Released: October 12, 2004
- Recorded: 1999–2004
- Genre: Rock
- Length: 1:48:20
- Label: Matador Records
- Producer: Various

Professional ratings
Review scores
Source	Rating
AllMusic	4/5 stars

Matador at Fifteen, a packaged release consisting of a CD of greatest hits, a CD of unreleased/rare tracks, and a DVD of its artists' music videos, was released by Matador Records on October 12, 2004, to celebrate the "15th Anniversary of contemporary rock's most self-congratulatory record label."

== Track listing ==
=== Disc one: Greatest Hits 1999-2004 ===
1. Pretty Girls Make Graves - "This Is Our Emergency"
2. Interpol - "Obstacle 1"
3. The New Pornographers - "The Laws Have Changed"
4. Mission of Burma - "Dirt"
5. Cat Power - "Free"
6. Stephen Malkmus - "Church on White"
7. Yo La Tengo - "Don't Have to Be So Sad"
8. Cornelius - "Drop"
9. The Jon Spencer Blues Explosion - "Money Rock 'n' Roll"
10. Dead Meadow - "The Whirlings"
11. Guided by Voices - "My Kind of Soldier"
12. Preston School of Industry - "Caught in the Rain"
13. Bardo Pond - "Inside"
14. Seachange - "Forty Nights"
15. Belle and Sebastian - "Don't Leave the Light on Baby"
16. Thalia Zedek - "1926"
17. Matmos - "For the Trees"
18. Mogwai - "Hunted by a Freak"

=== Disc two: Unreleased and Rarities 1999-2004 ===
1. The New Pornographers - "Graceland"
2. Interpol- "Specialist"
3. Pretty Girls Make Graves - "C-30 C-60 C-90 GO!"
4. M. Ward - "Duet for Guitars #1"
5. Stephen Malkmus and the Jicks - "It Kills"
6. Mogwai - "Hunted by a Freak (Boom Bip Remix)"
7. Dead Meadow - "Everything's Going On (Alternate Version)"
8. Yo La Tengo - "Deeper Into Movies (Acoustic Version)"
9. Mission of Burma - "Fame & Fortune (Live)"
10. Guided by Voices - "Free of This World"
11. Cat Power - "The Party"
12. Seachange - "Seven Calls"
13. Preston School of Industry - "Tone It Down (Pablo Wong Remix)"
14. A.C. Newman - "Homemade Bombs in the Afternoon"
15. Matmos - "Cymbals & Aspirin (A Breakthrough in Pain Relief)"
16. Cornelius - "Wataridori"

=== Disc three: Music Videos 1999-2004 (DVD) ===
1. Mogwai - "Stanley Kubrick"
2. Pavement - "Spit on a Stranger"
3. Mary Timony - "Dr. Cat"
4. The Wisdom of Harry - "Ladies & Gentlemen (In the Woods)"
5. Stephen Malkmus - "Discretion Grove"
6. Cornelius - "I Hate Hate"
7. The New Pornographers - "The Laws Have Changed"
8. Interpol - "PDA"
9. The Jon Spencer Blues Explosion - "She Said"
10. Cat Power - "He War"
11. Pretty Girls Make Graves - "This Is Our Emergency"
12. Matmos - "Stars and Stripes Forever"
