= Together (The New Pornographers album) =

Studio album by the New Pornographers
- Released: May 4, 2010
- Genre: Indie rock, power pop
- Length: 44:27
- Label: Last Gang (Canada); Matador (U.S.)
- Producer: The New Pornographers, Phil Palazzolo

The New Pornographers chronology
Challengers (2007)	Together (2010)	Brill Bruisers (2014)

Together is the fifth studio album by Canadian indie rock band the New Pornographers. It was released on May 4, 2010 and debuted at number 18 on the Billboard 200.

The album was recorded in seven studios in British Columbia and New York City and features guest appearances by Zach Condon of Beirut, Annie Clark (also known as St. Vincent), Will Sheff of Okkervil River, and the horn players from Sharon Jones & the Dap-Kings.

Together is dedicated to the memory of Lynn Calder, the mother of keyboardist Kathryn Calder, and the half-sister of Carl Newman. "Sweet Talk, Sweet Talk" was featured in an early 2011 ad campaign for the Amazon Kindle, while "Moves" was used in a commercial for the Hyundai 2012 Accent and a commercial for T-Mobile.

The album covers features a detail from "The Cliff" (2006) by Martin & Muñoz.

Videos from the album include "Your Hands (Together)", "Crash Years", "Sweet Talk, Sweet Talk", and "Moves".

== Release ==
Matador Records released the song "Your Hands (Together)" in February 2010 as the first sample of the album.

On March 23, the band announced their extensive North American tour in support of the album.

On April 25, the album was released as a digital stream on NPR's website, accessible until the album's May 4 release.

As of 2013, sales in the United States have exceeded 85,000 copies, according to Nielsen SoundScan.

== Reception ==
Professional ratings
Aggregate scores
Source	Rating
AnyDecentMusic?	6.5/10
Metacritic	71/100
Review scores
Source	Rating
AllMusic	4/5 stars
The A.V. Club	A−
Chicago Tribune	3/4 stars
The Independent	3/5 stars
Mojo	2/5 stars
NME	7/10
Pitchfork	7.3/10
Q	3/5 stars
Rolling Stone	3.5/5 stars
Spin	7/10

Together was met with largely positive reviews. The album was a longlisted nominee for the 2010 Polaris Music Prize, a music award given annually to the best full-length Canadian album based on artistic merit.

== Track listing ==
All songs written by Carl Newman, except where noted.

No.	Title	Vocals	Length
1.	"Moves"	Newman	3:53
2.	"Crash Years"	Neko Case	4:07
3.	"Your Hands (Together)"	Newman, Case, Kathryn Calder	3:33
4.	"Silver Jenny Dollar" (Dan Bejar)	Bejar	2:53
5.	"Sweet Talk, Sweet Talk"	Calder	3:40
6.	"My Shepherd"	Case	4:36
7.	"If You Can't See My Mirrors" (Bejar)	Bejar	2:56
8.	"Up in the Dark"	Newman	3:10
9.	"Valkyrie in the Roller Disco"	Newman, Calder	3:32
10.	"A Bite Out of My Bed"	Newman	3:13
11.	"Daughters of Sorrow" (Bejar)	Bejar	3:07
12.	"We End Up Together"	Newman, Calder	5:47
Total length:			44:27

=== Togetherness: The New Pornographers Play Outrageous Cherry ===
Togetherness: The New Pornographers Play Outrageous Cherry was included as a bonus 7" single with pre-orders of the LP in the U.S. and Canada, and the songs were bonus tracks on downloads of the album.

All songs written by Matthew Smith.

No.	Title	Length
13.	"Georgie, Don't You Know"	1:51
14.	"Togetherness"	2:14
15.	"Electric Child of Witchcraft Rising"	3:40
Total length:		7:45

== Personnel ==
- Dan Bejar - Vocals, Electric Guitar, Acoustic Guitar, Piano, Organ, Vibraphone, Percussion
- Kathryn Calder - Vocals, Keyboards, Piano
- Neko Case - Vocals
- John Collins - Bass, Acoustic Guitar, Keyboards, Kaossilator, Hagstrom 12 String
- Kurt Dahle - Drums, Percussion, Vox
- Todd Fancey - Guitar, Banjo
- A.C. Newman - Vocals, Guitars, Keyboards, Bass, Banjo
- Blaine Thurier - Keyboards

=== Additional musicians ===
- Annie Clark - Guitar Solo on "My Shepherd"
- Zach Condon - Trumpet on "A Bite Out of My Bed"
- The Dap-Kings Horns
- Cochemea Gastelum - Baritone Sax
- Dave Guy - Trumpet
- Ben Kalb - Cello
- Will Sheff - Back Up Vocals on "Moves"
- Neal Sugarman - Tenor Saxophone, Flute
- Tara Szczygielski - Violin
