= Whiteout Conditions =

Studio album by The New Pornographers
- Released: April 7, 2017
- Genre: Power pop, indie pop
- Length: 41:33
- Label: Concord
- Producer: A. C. Newman; John Collins

The New Pornographers chronology
Brill Bruisers (2014)	Whiteout Conditions (2017)	In the Morse Code of Brake Lights (2019)

Singles from Whiteout Conditions
- 1. "High Ticket Attractions" Released: January 27, 2017

Whiteout Conditions is the seventh studio album by Canadian indie rock band The New Pornographers. It was released on April 7, 2017, and is the first album not to feature either longtime drummer Kurt Dahle or singer-songwriter Dan Bejar.

The band released the first single "High Ticket Attractions" on January 27, 2017.

== Release and reception ==
Professional ratings
Aggregate scores
Source	Rating
AnyDecentMusic?	7.6/10
Metacritic	78/100
Review scores
Source	Rating
AllMusic	4/5 stars
The A.V. Club	C+
The Guardian	4/5 stars
The Independent	4/5 stars
Mojo	4/5 stars
Pitchfork	7.2/10
Q	3/5 stars
Slant Magazine	4/5 stars
Uncut	8/10
Vice	A

Whiteout Conditions was released by Concord Music Group on April 7, 2017, to generally positive reviews. At Metacritic, which assigns a normalized rating out of 100 to reviews from mainstream publications, it received an average score of 78, based on 21 reviews. Dave Simpson, a critic for The Guardian, said its "songs about depression, society and the environment sound euphoric" within the music's "exuberant pile-up of harmonies, hooks and powerpop". Andy Gill from The Independent observed "a drive and urgency about Whiteout Conditions that whisks one along regardless, their usual indie-pop mode here strengthened by layers of fast, bubbly synths and pulsing Eurocentric beats". Writing for Vice, Robert Christgau said lead vocalist and songwriter Carl Newman "generates 11 soaring new pop songs, which in some abstrusely Krautrock way are sparer than the 13 on Brill Bruisers". Erik Adams of The A.V. Club was less impressed, writing that the record featured interesting musical and emotional ideas, but lacked memorable melodies and a sense of dynamics.

The album was a longlisted nominee for the 2017 Polaris Music Prize.

== Track listing ==
All tracks are written by A. C. Newman

No.	Title	Vocals	Length
1.	"Play Money"	Neko Case, Newman	4:37
2.	"Whiteout Conditions"	Newman, Case	4:08
3.	"High Ticket Attractions"	Newman, Kathryn Calder	3:51
4.	"This Is the World of the Theater"	Case	4:27
5.	"Darling Shade"	Newman, Case	2:57
6.	"Second Sleep"	Newman	3:14
7.	"Colosseums"	Newman	3:15
8.	"We've Been Here Before"	Newman, Case, Calder	3:52
9.	"Juke"	Newman	3:29
10.	"Clockwise"	Newman, Case	3:14
11.	"Avalanche Alley"	Newman	4:11
Total length:			41:33

== Personnel ==
- Carl Newman – vocals, guitar
- Neko Case – vocals
- John Collins – bass
- Blaine Thurier – keyboards, synthesizer
- Todd Fancey – lead guitar
- Kathryn Calder – vocals, keyboards, guitar
- Joe Seiders – drums, vocals

== Charts ==
Chart (2017)	Peak position
Canadian Albums (Billboard)	82
US Billboard 200	35
