= Better Off in Bed =

- Directed by: Reginald Harkema
- Written by: Reginald Harkema
- Produced by: Hans Lucas; Julie Speed
- Starring: The New Pornographers
- Edited by: Kathy Weinkauf
- Release date: December 4, 2004 (Whistler)
- Running time: 82 minutes
- Country: Canada
- Language: English

Better Off in Bed is a Canadian documentary film, directed by Reginald Harkema and released in 2004. The film documents The New Pornographers on their 2002 concert tour of Western Canada, focusing on their interpersonal relationships with each other and opening act The Gay, whose members included Coco Culbertson and Sara Lapsley, the girlfriends of New Pornographers Todd Fancey and Kurt Dahle.

The film premiered in the Borsos Competition at the 2004 Whistler Film Festival, and it was subsequently screened at the Kingston Canadian Film Festival in 2005. However, the New Pornographers were reportedly uncomfortable with the fact that the film probed their personal lives rather than concentrating solely on the tour itself, and their lawyers intervened to prevent wider commercial release.
