= Frontperson =

Canadian indie pop band

Frontperson is a Canadian indie pop duo, consisting of Kathryn Calder of Immaculate Machine and the New Pornographers, and Mark Andrew Hamilton of Woodpigeon.

Calder and Hamilton met each other for the first time in the hallway at a studio where Calder's husband, Colin Stewart, was recording with Woodpigeon. They released their first album, Frontrunner, in 2018. The album, recorded at the National Music Centre in Calgary, Alberta, was supported by the single "Tick Tock (Frontrunner)", whose video was collated from clips of athletes played in reverse.

Their second album, Parade, was released in April 2022. The album's release was preceded by the release of two preview singles, the title track in February and "Ostalgie (Für C. Bischoff)" in March.

== Discography ==
Studio albums

- Frontrunner (2018)
- Parade (2022)
