= Brill Bruisers =

Studio album by the New Pornographers
- Released: August 26, 2014
- Genres: Indie rock, power pop
- Length: 43:01
- Labels: Last Gang (Canada); Matador (U.S.)
- Producers: A.C. Newman, John Collins, Howard Redekopp

The New Pornographers chronology
Together (2010)	Brill Bruisers (2014)	Whiteout Conditions (2017)

Singles from Brill Bruisers
- 1. "Brill Bruisers" Released: June 10, 2014; 2. "War on the East Coast" Released: July 16, 2014; 3. "Dancehall Domine" Released: November 23, 2014

Professional ratings
Aggregate scores
Source	Rating
AnyDecentMusic?	7.6/10
Metacritic	79/100
Review scores
Source	Rating
AllMusic	4/5 stars
The A.V. Club	B
Chicago Tribune	3/4 stars
Cuepoint (Expert Witness)	A−
Mojo	4/5 stars
NME	8/10
Pitchfork	7.7/10
Q	3/5 stars
Rolling Stone	3.5/5 stars
Spin	8/10

Brill Bruisers is the sixth studio album by Canadian indie rock band the New Pornographers. It was released on August 26, 2014 and debuted at number 13 on the Billboard 200. In describing the album, A.C. Newman called it "a celebration record... After periods of difficulty, I am at a place where nothing in my life is dragging me down and the music reflects that."

The first single from the album was "Brill Bruisers", released on June 10, 2014. The second single, "War on the East Coast", was released on July 16, 2014. The album was a longlisted nominee for the 2015 Polaris Music Prize on June 16, 2015, and was shortlisted on July 16, 2015.

== Track listing ==
All songs written and sung by A. C. Newman, except where noted.

No.	Title	Vocals	Length
1.	"Brill Bruisers"		2:56
2.	"Champions of Red Wine"	Neko Case	3:40
3.	"Fantasy Fools"		3:26
4.	"War on the East Coast" (Dan Bejar)	Bejar	3:58
5.	"Backstairs"		4:23
6.	"Marching Orders"	Case	4:19
7.	"Another Drug Deal of the Heart"	Kathryn Calder	1:28
8.	"Born with a Sound" (Bejar)	Bejar, Amber Webber	2:55
9.	"Wide Eyes"		2:56
10.	"Dancehall Domine"	Newman, Calder	3:18
11.	"Spidyr" (Bejar)	Bejar	2:21
12.	"Hi-Rise"		3:16
13.	"You Tell Me Where"		4:05
Total length:			43:01

The song "Spidyr" is a remake of Daniel Bejar's song "Spider" from Swan Lake's album Enemy Mine.

Amber Webber of Black Mountain and Lightning Dust shares vocals with Bejar on "Born with a Sound".

=== Vinyl edition ===
A special "paint spattered" limited-edition vinyl LP of the album was made available via pre-order. The LP includes a 3D-poster and 3D-glasses.

== Personnel ==
- Dan Bejar
- Kathryn Calder
- Neko Case
- John Collins
- Kurt Dahle
- Todd Fancey
- A.C. Newman
- Blaine Thurier
- Howard Redekopp - Engineer
