= Superconductor (band) =

Former Canadian alt rock band

- Origin: Vancouver, British Columbia, Canada
- Genres: alternative rock
- Years active: 1990–1996
- Label: Boner Records
- Past members: Carl Newman; Sean Elliot; Pat Hogue; Scott Gubbels; Brian Gillard; Warren Westling; Mike Kerley; Mike Rohaly; Keith Parry; Joe Preston

Superconductor was a Canadian alternative rock band from Vancouver, British Columbia, active in the 1990s. Led by Carl Newman, the band was known for an unusual instrumental approach which saw up to six guitarists and two bassists performing simultaneously on each song.

== History ==
Formed soon after Newman finished high school, the band included guitarists Sean Elliott, Pat Hogue, Scott Gubbels, Brian Gillard and Warren Westling, bassists Mike Kerley and Mike Rohaly, and drummer Keith Parry. They released the single "The Most Popular Man in the World" in 1991 and the EP Heavy with Puppy in 1992. In 1993, Superconductor released their full length debut album Hit Songs for Girls, which included aspects of metal and punk music mixed with rock.

The band toured to support the album as an opening act for Guided by Voices. Around the same time, Newman joined the side project Zumpano, to concentrate on more pop-oriented music.

The band followed up in 1994 with Anvil to the Fucking Head, an eight-song EP released in the vintage 8-track tape format. Their second and final album, Bastardsong, was released in 1996.

The band broke up following Bastardsong, with Zumpano continuing as Newman's primary band until he formed The New Pornographers.
