= Twin Cinema =

Studio album by the New Pornographers
- Released: August 23, 2005
- Recorded: November 2004–April 2005
- Genre: Indie rock; power pop; pop rock
- Length: 47:46
- Label: Mint/Matador/P-Vine
- Producer: John Collins, David Carswell, A.C. Newman, Kurt Dahle

The New Pornographers chronology
Electric Version (2003)	Twin Cinema (2005)	Challengers (2007)

Twin Cinema is the third studio album by Canadian indie rock group the New Pornographers. It was released on August 23, 2005. The album was shortlisted for the 2006 Polaris Music Prize. As of 2010 it has sold 138,000 copies in US and 20,000 copies in Canada.

== Critical reception ==
Professional ratings
Aggregate scores
Source	Rating
Metacritic	85/100
Review scores
Source	Rating
AllMusic	5/5 stars
Blender	4/5 stars
Entertainment Weekly	A
The Irish Times	4/5 stars
Los Angeles Times	2.5/4 stars
NME	5/10
Pitchfork	9.0/10
Rolling Stone	4/5 stars
Spin	A−
Uncut	4/5 stars

Initial critical response to Twin Cinema was very positive. At Metacritic, which assigns to reviews from mainstream critics a normalized rating out of 100, the album has received a score of 85, based on 32 reviews. Online music magazine PopMatters ranked the album at #1 on their Best Music of 2005 list. Pitchfork placed Twin Cinema at number 150 on their list of Top 200 Albums of the 2000s, as well as at number 18 on their list of The 50 Best Indie Rock Albums of the Pacific Northwest.

== Track listing ==
All songs written and sung by A. C. Newman, except where noted.

No.	Title	Vocals	Length
1.	"Twin Cinema"		2:59
2.	"The Bones of an Idol"	Neko Case	2:51
3.	"Use It"		3:26
4.	"The Bleeding Heart Show"	Newman, Case	4:27
5.	"Jackie, Dressed in Cobras" (Dan Bejar)	Bejar	3:06
6.	"The Jessica Numbers" (Newman, John Collins)		3:06
7.	"These Are the Fables"	Case	3:29
8.	"Sing Me Spanish Techno"		4:16
9.	"Falling Through Your Clothes"		2:53
10.	"Broken Breads" (Bejar)	Bejar	3:00
11.	"Three or Four"	Newman, Case	3:07
12.	"Star Bodies"	Newman, Case	4:07
13.	"Streets of Fire" (Bejar)	Bejar, Case	2:41
14.	"Stacked Crooked"		4:18
Total length:			47:46

Bonus track on Japanese release and iTunes version
No.	Title	Length
15.	"High Art, Local News"	3:02

== Personnel ==
The New Pornographers

- A.C. Newman – vocals, guitar, ebow, synthesizer, harmonica, pump organ, xylophone
- John Collins – bass, guitar, synthesizer, ebow, vocals
- Kurt Dahle – drums, percussion, vocals
- Dan Bejar – vocals, guitar, synthesizer, melodeon
- Neko Case – vocals
- Blaine Thurier – synthesizer
- Todd Fancey – guitar
- Kathryn Calder – piano, vocals

Additional personnel

- Nora O'Connor – vocals
- David Carswell – slide guitar, vocals
- Shaun Brodie – trumpet
- Todd Macdonald – mandolin
- Tyr Jami – cello
- Amy Tuyn – art work
- Sarah Pedersen – photography
- Howard Redekopp – engineer

== Charts ==
Chart performance
Chart (2005)	Peak position
Canadian Albums (Nielsen SoundScan)	40
US Billboard 200	44
US Independent Albums (Billboard)	5
