= Electric Version =

Studio album by the New Pornographers
- Released: 6 May 2003
- Recorded: November 2001 – October 2002
- Genres: Indie rock, power pop, post-punk revival
- Length: 46:41
- Labels: Mint, Matador
- Producer: The New Pornographers

The New Pornographers chronology
Mass Romantic (2000)	Electric Version (2003)	Twin Cinema (2005)

Professional ratings
Aggregate scores
Source	Rating
Metacritic	82/100
Review scores
Source	Rating
AllMusic	4.5/5 stars
Alternative Press	4/5
Blender	4/5 stars
Entertainment Weekly	A−
The Guardian	3/5 stars
Pitchfork	8.1/10
Rolling Stone	3/5 stars
The Rolling Stone Album Guide	4/5 stars
Uncut	3/5 stars
The Village Voice	B+

Electric Version is the second studio album by Canadian indie rock group the New Pornographers. It was released on Matador Records and Mint Records on May 6, 2003.

Electric Version placed at number seven in The Village Voice's Pazz & Jop poll of 2003 and was ranked at number 20 on PopMatters' Best Music of 2003 list. In 2009, the album ranked number 79 in Rolling Stone's "100 Best Albums of the Decade".

"The Electric Version" is included as a playable song in the video game Rock Band, after narrowly avoiding being cut.

As of 2009, sales in the United States have exceeded 113,000 copies, according to Nielsen SoundScan.

== Track listing ==
All songs written and sung by Carl Newman, except as noted.

No.	Title	Vocals	Length
1.	"The Electric Version"		2:53
2.	"From Blown Speakers"		2:49
3.	"The Laws Have Changed"	Neko Case, Newman	3:26
4.	"The End of Medicine"		2:37
5.	"Loose Translation"		2:59
6.	"Chump Change" (Dan Bejar)	Bejar	4:18
7.	"All for Swinging You Around"	Case	3:42
8.	"The New Face of Zero and One"	Case, Newman	4:11
9.	"Testament to Youth in Verse" (Bejar)	Bejar	3:57
10.	"It's Only Divine Right"		4:11
11.	"Ballad of a Comeback Kid" (Bejar)	Bejar	3:51
12.	"July Jones"		4:18
13.	"Miss Teen Wordpower"	Case, Newman	3:23
Total length:			46:41

Japanese bonus track
No.	Title	Length
14.	"Turn"	3:52

== Personnel ==
Musicians

- Carl Newman – vocals, guitar, keyboards, melodeon
- Neko Case – vocals
- John Collins – bass, baritone guitar, keyboards
- Blaine Thurier – keyboards
- Kurt Dahle – drums, percussion, vocals, double bass
- Todd Fancey – guitar, keyboards
- Dan Bejar (secret member) – vocals
- Nora O'Connor – additional vocals
- Tim Sars – saxophone
- Monica Cattaway – violin
- Nyla Rainey – cello

Production

- The New Pornographers - production
- Howard Redekopp - engineering, mixing

== Charts ==
Chart performance
Chart (2003)	Peak position
Canadian Albums (Nielsen SoundScan)	66
US Billboard 200	196
US Independent Albums (Billboard)	12
