= Mass Romantic =

Studio album by the New Pornographers
- Released: October 24, 2000
- Recorded: 1998–2000
- Genres: Indie rock, power pop
- Length: 40:54
- Label: Mint
- Producers: John Collins, David Carswell

The New Pornographers chronology
Mass Romantic (2000)	Electric Version (2003)

Singles from Mass Romantic
- 1. "Letter from an Occupant" Released: April 15, 2002

Mass Romantic is the debut studio album by Canadian indie rock supergroup the New Pornographers, released on October 24, 2000 on Mint Records. Produced by David Carswell and bass guitarist John Collins, the album was worked on for almost three years, with musicians A.C. Newman and Dan Bejar writing songs as early as 1998. With encouragement from peers, they recorded an album with other Canadian musicians from groups including the Evaporators, Zumpano, and Destroyer.

The album failed to chart in Canada or the United States, but the group had a sold-out tour, due to very positive reviews. It received a score of 87 from Metacritic, which assigns a normalized rating out of 100 to reviews from mainstream critics.

== Production ==
Mass Romantic was recorded over the course of almost three years. The first four songs were finished in early 1998. The New Pornographers claimed that the songs "were just sitting around. Friends would hear the songs and go, 'This is really great,' and so it was kind of frustrating in a way. We'd go, 'Yeah, well, we're going to try to record a record.'" The group's producer and bassist John Collins decided to refer to themselves as a super group. The band consisted of Zumpano's Carl Newman, John Collins of The Evaporators, Dan Bejar of Destroyer, Limblifter's Kurt Dahle, filmmaker Blaine Thurier, and alternative country singer Neko Case.

Production on the album was difficult. A.C. Newman stated, "I remember 'Letter From an Occupant' was a pretty belabored song. It ended up being almost minimal, but I remember there's so much shit we put on it. There's a psychedelic 12-string guitar solo, a backwards guitar, there's a kind of really cool synth that's in there but buried. At some point, you have to choose. That was the hardest part about mixing the thing: just making that judgment call. I only feel at peace with the record now because people seem to like it."

The songs on the album were written by A.C. Newman and Destroyer frontman Dan Bejar. Newman recalled that he thought "'How could we lose?' You could just take some interesting elements and put them together. Even taking myself out of the picture, when I looked at the band I just thought, 'This band's got to be great.' I thought, 'Okay, everyone can hate my songs, they can dismiss them.' But I have the most confidence in Dan's songs because I'm totally outside of him, looking in. I'm just a fan of him."

The song "Breakin' the Law" was taken from Destroyer's first album We'll Build Them a Golden Bridge. The group vocals at the end of "Breakin' the Law" are credited to the Camp Northstar Kids' Chorus, a reference to the Canadian comedy film Meatballs. The chorus is actually every member of the band singing. Newman stated, "I like the fact that people think that it's a kids' group ... We made ourselves sound like a giant group, but we ended up sounding like little kids. I love the fact that in the Rolling Stone review they mention the chorus of kids. I just think it's great that people actually believe that, because it's such a fucking ridiculous thing for a band to do."

== Style ==
Tim DiGravina of AllMusic called Mass Romantic an album that "displays a decidedly power pop form of indie rock." DiGravina noted comparison per individual song with "the Beatles ('The Mary Martin Show') to David Bowie ('The Slow Descent into Alcoholism') to T.Rex ('Mystery Hours') to Todd Rundgren ('The Fake Headlines')." Jim Caliguiry of The Austin Chronicle noted, "They borrow from Cheap Trick, the Beach Boys, Big Star, Roxy Music, Buzzcocks, and Robyn Hitchcock". Rolling Stone also made comparisons to Big Star and Cheap Trick.

The album's lyrics have been described as "ridiculous and melodramatic as they are witty".

== Release ==
Mass Romantic was released on November 21, 2000, by Mint Records on vinyl and compact disc in Canada. It received an official United States release when it was released in a remastered form by Matador Records on October 7, 2003. "Letter from an Occupant", released on April 15, 2002, was the only single.

The New Pornographers went on their first tour to promote the album. The tour presented problems, including throat damage, broken-down buses, and having to take expensive cab rides. A.C. Newman spoke positively about the tour, stating, "There's been fairly good crowds, but the shows haven't been that crazy. They've been getting better ... We're not really a party band. I hope people can party. We give them the music! Isn't that enough?" The tour sold out.

== Reception ==
Professional ratings
Aggregate scores
Source	Rating
Metacritic	87/100
Review scores
Source	Rating
AllMusic	4.5/5 stars
Alternative Press	4/5
Entertainment Weekly	A
NME	6/10
Now	5/5
Pitchfork	8.4/10
Rolling Stone	3.5/5 stars
The Rolling Stone Album Guide	4.5/5 stars
Spin	8/10
The Village Voice	A−

Mass Romantic was well received in the band's native Canada, where it won a Juno Award for Alternative Album of the Year. On Metacritic, which assigns a normalized rating out of 100 to reviews from mainstream critics, the album received a score of 87, indicating "universal acclaim". Tim DiGravina of AllMusic described Mass Romantic as an album "that reveals its charms through repeat listens, and makes a listener wonder how the band can master so many different musical styles via so many vocalists while still maintaining a fiercely cohesive sound." Laura Morgan of Entertainment Weekly called it "an insanely contagious concoction of new wave, Cheap Trick, and garage-glam pandemonium" and "a perfect pop album." PopMatters's James Mann also spoke positively of the album, stating that the New Pornographers "have made such a great album, tuneful, overdosed with hooks, that all the past sins of our Northern neighbors are forgiven. Well, maybe not Rush, but close."

Douglas Wolk of Rolling Stone described Mass Romantic as "a striking power-pop album, forty staggeringly catchy minutes of four-part harmonies and Wall of Sound production, exploding with energy and joy", while the Alternative Press called the album a "masterful reproduction of underground power pop ca. 1979, complete with cheesy synths and slashing guitar leads". Tim Caligiuri of The Austin Chronicle stated that "Mass Romantic is the type of album nobody makes anymore. It's an intricate and brightly colored gem, filled with sing-along melodies and sounds that shouldn't work together yet do." In a mixed assessment, Q referred to Mass Romantic as "charmingly poppy", but nonetheless an "erratic affair". Tyler Martin of Stylus Magazine felt that "too many misdirected ideas weigh this album down".

The album charted in several best of the year lists from various critics. Pitchfork rated it the ninth best album of 2001, stating, "Energetic, smooth, and masterfully executed, Mass Romantic is the catchiest thing to come out in ages." The site later placed Mass Romantic at number 91 on their list of top 200 albums of the 2000s. Magnet magazine included the album in its "20 Best Albums of 2001" list. In The Village Voice's Pazz & Jop critics' poll for 2001, the album placed at number seventeen. In December 2007, Blender listed Mass Romantic as the 24th best indie rock album of all time. It is the second-highest Canadian album on the list behind Arcade Fire's Funeral, which was selected as the 6th best.

== Track listing ==
All songs written and sung by Carl Newman, except where noted.

No.	Title	Writer(s)	Vocals	Length
1.	"Mass Romantic"		Neko Case, Newman	4:11
2.	"The Fake Headlines"			2:45
3.	"The Slow Descent into Alcoholism"			3:56
4.	"Mystery Hours"			3:11
5.	"Jackie"	Dan Bejar	Bejar	2:46
6.	"Letter from an Occupant"		Case	3:46
7.	"To Wild Homes"	Bejar, Newman	Bejar, Case, Newman	3:33
8.	"The Body Says No"			3:56
9.	"Execution Day"	Bejar	Bejar, Newman	2:59
10.	"Centre for Holy Wars"			3:06
11.	"The Mary Martin Show"			3:19
12.	"Breakin' the Law"	Bejar	Bejar, Newman	3:27
Total length:				40:54

Japanese release
No.	Title	Writer(s)	Length
13.	"The End of Medicine"		2:34
14.	"When I Was a Baby"	Sam Coomes	2:26

== Personnel ==
- Bill Anderson – photography
- Dan Bejar – vocals, multi-instruments, korg synthesizer, pipe organ, wurlitzer
- David Carswell – producer
- Neko Case – vocals
- Davidian Chorley – saxophone (tracks 8, 11)
- John Collins – bass, producer, engineer
- Kurt Dahle – drums, vocals
- Carl Newman – vocals, korg synthesizer, pipe organ, wurlitzer
- Shannon Oksanen – photography
- Fisher Rose – drums (tracks 4, 6, 9, 12)
- Blaine Thurier – keyboards
