= Zumpano =

Canadian power pop group

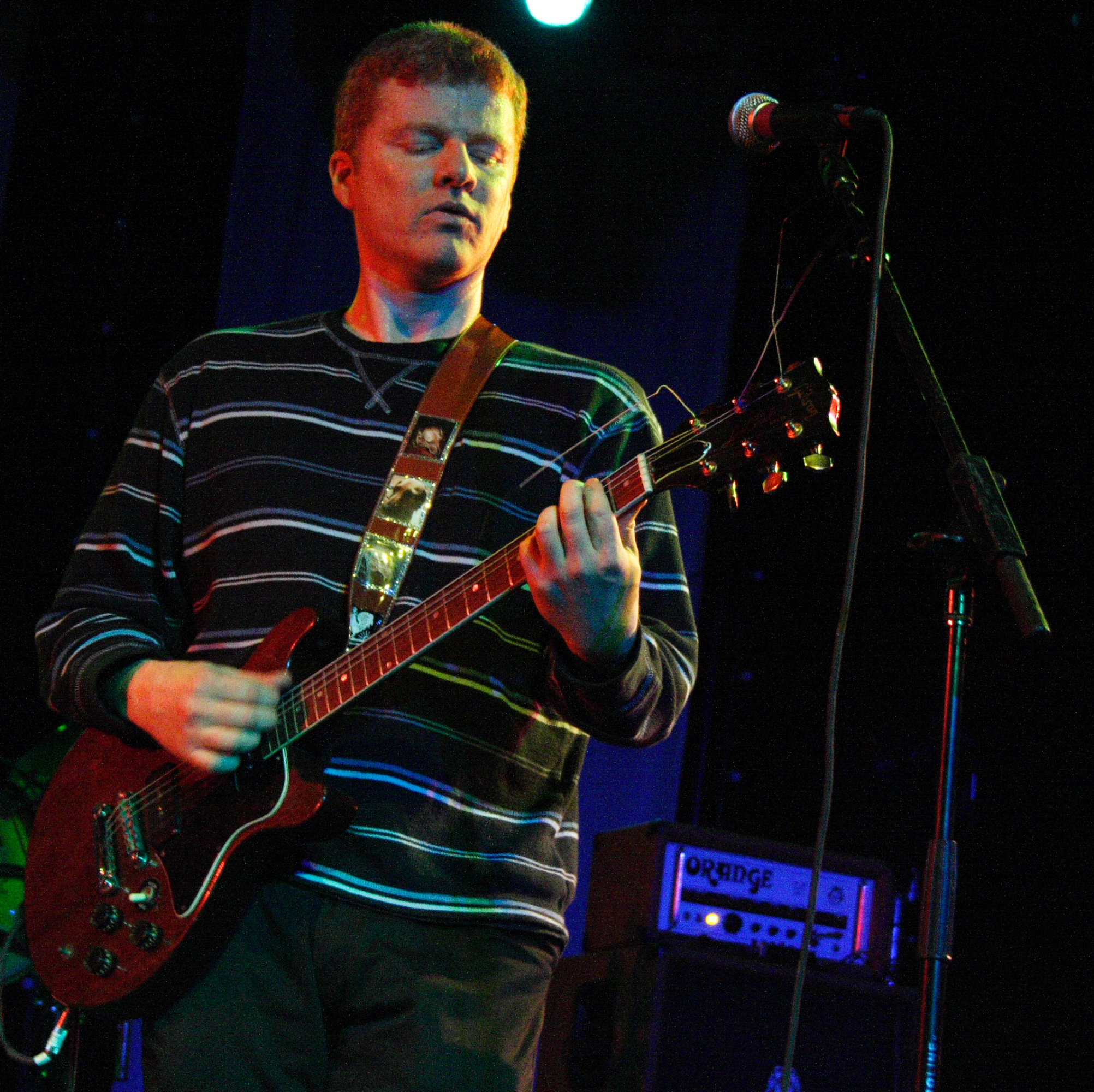
- Carl Newman of The New Pornographers performing on March 2, 2006 at the Nokia Theatre in Times Square

Background information
- Origin: Vancouver, British Columbia, Canada
- Genres: Power pop
- Years active: 1992–1996
- Labels: Sub Pop
- Past members: Carl Newman; Michael Ledwidge; Stefan Niemann; Jason Zumpano

Zumpano was a Canadian power pop group in the 1990s.

The band, whose music style resembled such contemporaries as Sloan and The Super Friendz, consisted of vocalist/guitarist Carl Newman, keyboardist Michael Ledwidge, bassist Stefan Niemann, and drummer Jason Zumpano.

The band formed in 1992 after Zumpano and Ledwidge dissolved their band Glee, which they felt was "artistically impure" despite beginning to enjoy some success. Newman joined the band while still a member of Superconductor.

The band signed to Sub Pop Records in 1994, along with fellow Canadians Eric's Trip, Jale, and The Hardship Post, as part of the label's shift away from pure grunge rock. They released two albums on the label before breaking up. Newman reemerged in 2000 with The New Pornographers, and Jason Zumpano formed the band Sparrow in 2003 and Attics and Cellars in 2007. Newman and Zumpano have also independently released solo material, and both acted in Blaine Thurier's 2000 microbudget film Low Self-Esteem Girl.

== Discography ==
=== Albums ===
- Look What the Rookie Did (1995)
- Goin' Through Changes (1996)

=== Singles & EPs ===
- Zumpano (1993) - self-released cassette
- Wraparound Shades (1994, Sub Pop) - 7" single.
- The Only Reason Under The Sun (1996, Murderecords) - 7" single.

=== Compilations ===
- Twisted (1997, Poster Girl Records) - "The Moment Business" - 4 band split single.
