= Look What the Rookie Did =

Studio album by Zumpano
- Released: January 24, 1995
- Recorded: 1993
- Genre: Indie rock
- Label: Sub Pop
- Producer: Kevin Kane

Zumpano chronology
Look What the Rookie Did (1995)	Goin' Through Changes (1996)

Look What the Rookie Did is the debut album by Canadian band Zumpano, released in 1995. The album is available for listening online. Videos were released for the singles "The Party Rages On" and "I Dig You". The Sub Pop CD release of this album (sp277b) features the Hardship Post, and their song "Let There Be Girls" as an unlisted track on the CD.

== Production ==
The album was produced by Kevin Kane. It was recorded about two years prior to its release.

== Critical reception ==
Professional ratings
Review scores
Source	Rating
AllMusic	4/5 stars
MusicHound Rock: The Essential Album Guide	3/5 stars

Trouser Press wrote that "Zumpano is able to fight off the potential for coyness in its polka dot endeavors and ambitious enough to raise the ante with dramatic horns and pedal steel, treating period evocation as an intermediate goal rather than the stylistic finish line." The Washington Post wrote that "the proceedings are sometimes a little arch, but Zumpano and company usually marshal the melodies to keep their concept from flagging." CMJ New Music Monthly thought that "the sound is so perversely incongruous with everything else going on today, and is played with such unabashed garage-band innocence, that it actually sounds fresh, and you just can't help but be charmed."

In a retrospective review, Magnet wrote that the album's "best songs ('The Party Rages On', 'Temptation Summary', 'I Dig You') were on par with the Brill Building breezy-listening pop that inspired them, possessing the sort of pristine, heartfelt, melancholy melodies that were all but banished from the airwaves by 1995." AllMusic wrote that "the freshness of Zumpano's sound, combined with adventurous melodies and rhythms, makes this an essential piece of work." Exclaim! opined that Look What the Rookie Did "combines peerless tunefulness with instrumental complexity (guitars, keyboards, backing vocals and horns all stacked Yurtle high), topped with [Carl] Newman's incomparable, lispy vocals."

== Track listing ==
1. The Party Rages On
2. Oh That Atkinson Girl
3. Rosecrans Boulevard
4. Platinum Is Best Served Cold
5. Evil Black Magic
6. Temptation Summary
7. I Dig You
8. Wraparound Shades
9. Snowflakes and Heartaches
10. Jeez-Louise
11. (She's a) Full-Blooded Sicilian
12. Let There Be Girls - The Hardship Post (Bonus Track)
