= Shut Down the Streets =

Studio album by A. C. Newman
- Released: October 9, 2012
- Recorded: 2012
- Genre: Indie rock
- Length: 40:20
- Label: Last Gang; Matador
- Producer: Colin Stewart

A. C. Newman chronology
Get Guilty (2009)	Shut Down the Streets (2012)

Shut Down the Streets is the third solo studio album by Canadian musician A. C. Newman. It was released on October 9, 2012 via Last Gang/Matador Records. Production was handled by Colin Stewart.

The album was named a longlisted nominee for the 2013 Polaris Music Prize and a shortlisted nominee for the Juno Award for Adult Alternative Album of the Year at the Juno Awards of 2014.

== Critical reception ==
Professional ratings
Aggregate scores
Source	Rating
AnyDecentMusic?	7/10
Metacritic	74/100
Review scores
Source	Rating
AllMusic	4/5 stars
Beats Per Minute	76/100%
Consequence of Sound	C−
DIY	4/5 stars
Now	4/5 Ns
Paste	8.8/10
Pitchfork	6.8/10
PopMatters	7/10
The A.V. Club	B
Under the Radar	7/10 stars

Shut Down the Streets was met with generally favorable reviews from music critics. At Metacritic, which assigns a normalized rating out of 100 to reviews from mainstream publications, the album received an average score of 74 based on twenty-two reviews. The aggregator AnyDecentMusic? has the critical consensus of the album at a 7 out of 10, based on nineteen reviews.

Ryan Reed of Paste praised the album, claiming: "by opening up, by giving a glimpse into the heart behind those heart-stopping melodies, Newman's written his best songs in nearly a decade". AllMusic's James Christopher Monger called the album "as accessible as it is rewarding, and as refreshingly idiosyncratic as it is revealing". Tom Baker of DIY called it "a truly mature and well-rounded work, with a complete lack of pretension, and a lot of warmth and heart". Carla Gillis of Now noted: "lyrically, he's still clever but also much more direct, and there's greater impact because of it". Brendan Frank of Beats Per Minute found that the album "successfully infuses what could fly as an intimate acoustic set with contagious pop hooks". Annie Bydlon Zaleski of The A.V. Club resumed: "Shut Down the Streets is worth getting over any bias, though: It's the rare adult album that isn't a self-indulgent bore". Zachary Houle of PopMatters wrote: "Shut Down the Streets is not a record for the young--it is wisdom wrapped around the indelible songwriting skills of one of Canada's most distinctive musicians". David Brusie of Under the Radar stated: "as is the case with all of Newman's work, there are plenty of surprises here, many of which reflect the surprises of the death and birth of loved ones". Steven Hyden of Pitchfork wrote: "Newman's melodic gifts continue to serve the emotional core of his songs well, but he pulls his punches with opaque lyrics and too many wheelhouse-sticking power-pop cuts that keep Streets from achieving the impact it could have had".

In his mixed review for Consequence, Justin Gerber concluded: "Shut Down the Streets is a strange beast and one that will fall victim to that option that destroys the album sequence as we know it: shuffle. Fortunately, the high points are so high that they warrant a listen, even a purchase of the record as a whole".

== Track listing ==
No.	Title	Length
1.	"I'm Not Talking"	4:38
2.	"Do Your Own Time"	4:33
3.	"You Could Get Lost Out Here"	4:04
4.	"Encyclopedia of Classic Takedowns"	3:59
5.	"There's Money in New Wave"	3:18
6.	"Strings"	4:37
7.	"Hostages"	4:09
8.	"Wasted English"	3:22
9.	"The Troubadour"	3:49
10.	"They Should Have Shut Down the Streets"	3:51
Total length:		40:20
