= The Consonant C =

Canadian alternative pop group

- Also known as: The Summerwood Warren
- Origin: Calgary, Alberta, Canada
- Genres: Alternative pop
- Years active: 2005–present
- Members: Mark Connolley-Mendoza; Laura Leif; Jennifer Crighton; Clea Foofat; Jared Andres; Danny Vescarelly

The Consonant C are a Canadian alternative pop group formed in 2005 in Calgary. They are currently unsigned. They pull their influences from various genres of music including classical, jazz, punk rock and folk. Under the name The Summerwood Warren they co-organize and perform in monthly themed music and art shows, which bring together members from the Calgary arts community.

== History ==
The Consonant C was formed by six friends in Calgary, Alberta. Clea Foofat and Laura Leif got their start as a duo. Jennifer Crighton and Jared Andres joined the band and the quartet recorded and released the five song EP Bunnyfish in December 2005. The EP was primarily songs that Clea Foofat and Laura Leif had written. The group then went on hiatus to pursue other projects and interests but came back together in 2006 with the addition of bassist Mark Connolley-Mendoza. The band's first show was opening for Montreal's Camaromance at a community hall in Calgary in the fall of 2006. Acoustic bassist Danny Vescarelly was the last member to join the group. The band began recording their first full-length album Capes and Crowns in May, 2007. It was recorded at a basement studio, Calgary's Outhouse, by engineer Grant Howarth. It was released August 19, 2007. The band toured the West Coast (with dates in the United States) following the completion of their album.

The band also works as The Summerwood Warren music collective to co-organize and participate in all-ages theme shows. The shows include musical events, performance art, and video pieces and are a mechanism for artists in Calgary to meet and make music and art together. They are mainly held at EMMedia. Each show follows a particular theme. Past themes have included a forest show, where the performers dressed as fauna, and a spelunking show, where the only light in the performance came from head lamps worn by the performers and flashlights audience members carried. The Summerwood Warren music collective acts a facilitator for Calgary's music community but hopes to expand and act as a point of contact for Canada-wide musicians looking to set up tours.

The band disbanded in early 2009 due to creative differences. Each of the band members has pursued careers in different musical directions.

== Personnel ==
The band is now a six-member, multi-instrumental ensemble. Current members are Mark Connolley-Mendoza (bass, banjo, guitar, vocals), Laura Leif (ukulele, guitar, bass, piano, glockenspiel, vocals), Jennifer Crighton (harp, glockenspiel, vocals), Clea Foofat (piano, cello, ukulele, glockenspiel, vocals), Jared Andres (drums) and Danny Vescarelly (guitar, mandolin, bass). The band had previously gone through four and five member incarnations before adding more members to the group and becoming a sextet.

== Music and discography ==
Discography: Bunnyfish (5 Song EP, 2005); Capes and Crowns (Full-length album, August 19, 2007).

Since its release in 2007, Capes and Crowns, has made it in the top ten in Vancouver, Prince George, Edmonton, Sudbury and Halifax and has reached number one in Calgary and Lethbridge.

The Consonant C's music has been described as "soft and subtle, yet powerful nonetheless" and filled with "childlike glee through the lens of grownup music". One song on their full-length album, Capes and Crowns, is dedicated to indie band Azeda Booth. The song recalls "wintertime toboggan adventures and other such, whimsical Narnia-esque adventures".

The band continues to perform shows and expand through collaborations. In January, 2008 they performed with the Summerlad as part of One Yellow Rabbit's High Performance Rodeo. In 2008, they also performed shows at the Sled Island Festival and the Calgary Folk Festival.

In January 2009 the band released a new song called "So Awesome", available for streaming through its MySpace page.
