= Get Guilty =

Studio album by A. C. Newman
- Released: January 20, 2009
- Recorded: 2008
- Studio: Seaside Lounge (Brooklyn, NY); Retromedia Studios (Red Bank, NJ); The Dude Ranch (Wanamassa, NJ)
- Genre: Indie rock
- Length: 42:04
- Label: Last Gang; Matador
- Producer: A. C. Newman; Phil Palazzolo

A. C. Newman chronology
The Slow Wonder (2004)	Get Guilty (2009)	Shut Down the Streets (2012)

Get Guilty is the second solo studio album by Canadian musician A. C. Newman. It was released on January 20, 2009, via Last Gang/Matador Records. Recording sessions took place at Seaside Lounge in Brooklyn during the summer of 2008 with additional vocals were recorded at Retromedia Studios in Red Bank and The Dude Ranch in Wanamassa. Production was handled by Newman himself together with Phil Palazzolo.

In the United States, the album debuted at number 99 on the Billboard 200, number 11 on the Independent Albums and number 7 on the Tastemakers charts.

== Critical reception ==
Professional ratings
Aggregate scores
Source	Rating
Metacritic	73/100
Review scores
Source	Rating
AllMusic	4/5 stars
Consequence of Sound	C+
IGN	7.5/10
Pitchfork	7.5/10
PopMatters	8/10
Slant	4/5 stars
Spin	3.5/5 stars
The A.V. Club	A−
The Boston Phoenix	2/4 stars
Tiny Mix Tapes	3.5/5 marks

Get Guilty was met with generally favorable reviews from music critics. At Metacritic, which assigns a normalized rating out of 100 to reviews from mainstream publications, the album received an average score of 73 based on twenty-four reviews.

Noel Murray of The A.V. Club praised the album, calling it "a stirring set of memorable power-pop, given a personal spin via Newman's habit of delivering hard-to-parse pronouncements, like some kind of mad-eyed, curiously convincing soothsayer". AllMusic's Tim Sendra stated: "anyone who can craft a record that sounds and feels as good as Get Guilty deserves to keep on making records forever". Matthew Fiander of PopMatters wrote: "as the album fades out to Newman and company singing, you feel drawn in to the song, much closer to the record than when you began. And that feeling is what makes Get Guilty fantastic". Jesse Cataldo of Slant Magazine concluded: "yet all of this feels like quibbling when surveying an album that's still devastatingly charming, consistently intelligent, and engaging on first listen". Eric Harvey of Pitchfork wrote: "like Wonder, Guilty has its share of up-tempo tracks, yet its real pleasures are idiosyncratic, revealing themselves the more attentively and often you listen". Jessica Suarez of Spin found the album "dwells on the past, and that pensive reflection mutes the second half, turning Newman's boast into a wistful memory". Brendan Mahoney of Tiny Mix Tapes resumed: "this is just a modern rock record, and it definitely won't change your life, but it's more than competent and beyond clever".

In his mixed review for The Boston Phoenix, Michael Patrick Brady wrote: "too many of the songs rely on a stilted, march-like rhythm that makes them sound formal and restrained, especially when paired with Newman's arch lyrical delivery".

=== Accolades ===
Accolades for Get Guilty
Publication	Accolade	Rank	Ref.
Slant	The 25 Best Albums & Singles of 2009	13	

== Track listing ==
All tracks are written by Allan Carl Newman.

No.	Title	Length
1.	"There Are Maybe Ten or Twelve..."	2:40
2.	"The Heartbreak Rides"	4:09
3.	"Like a Hitman, Like a Dancer"	3:40
4.	"Prophets"	2:58
5.	"Submarines of Stockholm"	3:54
6.	"Thunderbolts"	3:45
7.	"The Palace at 4 AM"	3:22
8.	"The Changeling (Get Guilty)"	3:19
9.	"Elemental"	3:28
10.	"Young Atlantis"	3:49
11.	"The Collected Works"	3:09
12.	"All of My Days and All of My Days Off"	3:51
Total length:		42:04

== Personnel ==
- Allan Carl "A. C." Newman – lyrics, vocals, guitar, bass, keyboards, mandolin, melodion, percussion, producer, mixing assistant
- Jason Hammel – vocals
- Kori Gardner – vocals
- Nicole Atkins – vocals
- Brendan Ryan – piano, electric piano, accordion, trumpet
- Phil Palazzolo – bass (track 8), producer, recording, mixing
- Josh Clark – bass (track 11), additional recording
- Charles Burst – drums & percussion (tracks: 1, 8–10), additional recording
- Jon Wurster – drums & percussion (tracks: 2–7, 11, 12)
- "Moist" Paula Henderson – baritone saxophone
- Pamela Quinn – flutes
- Jay Bryan Flatt – recorders
- Eric Heveron-Smith – trombone, additional recording
- Tara Szczygielski – violin
- Ian Larkin – additional vocals recording
- John Noll – additional vocals recording
- JJ Golden – mastering

== Charts ==
Chart (2009)	Peak position
US Billboard 200	99
US Independent Albums (Billboard)	11
