= Goin' Through Changes =

Studio album by Zumpano
- Released: 1996
- Genre: Indie rock
- Label: Sub Pop
- Producer: Keith Cleversley

Zumpano chronology
| Look What the Rookie Did (1995) | Goin' Through Changes (1996) |

Goin' Through Changes is the second and final album by Canadian band Zumpano. It was produced by Keith Cleversley and released in 1996 by Sub Pop. The album is available for listening online.

A video was made for the song "Behind the Beehive".

== Critical reception ==
Professional ratings
Review scores
| Source | Rating |
|---|---|
| AllMusic | 4.5/5 stars |
| Entertainment Weekly | B |
| MusicHound Rock: The Essential Album Guide | 5/5 stars |
| Pitchfork | 7.7.10 |

MusicHound Rock: The Essential Album Guide wrote that "the album, devoid of the occasional rawness that makes [Zumpano's] debut sound unfinished, is a masterpiece." Trouser Press called the album "another absolute delight," writing that it displays "more ambition, confidence and intuitive skill." Portland Mercury called it "a melancholy masterpiece that cemented Carl Newman's entrenchment in the mid-'60s piano pop cocktail lounge of the mind."

== Track listing ==
1. "Behind the Beehive"
2. "Broca's Ways"
3. "Throwing Stars"
4. "Here's the Plan"
5. "The Only Reason Under the Sun"
6. "The Millionaire Poets"
7. "Let's Fight"
8. "It Doesn't Take a Genius"
9. "The Sylvia Hotel"
10. "Momentum"
11. "The Angel with the Good News"
12. "Some Sun"
