= Todd Fancey =

Canadian musician

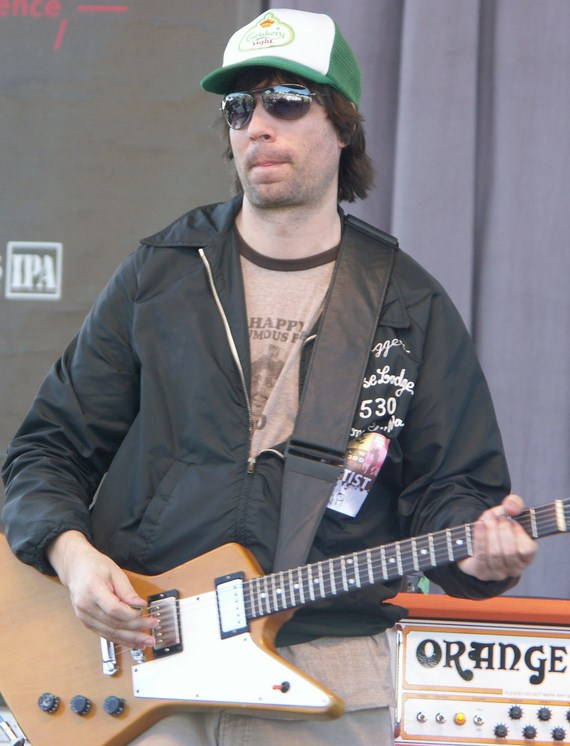
- At the Slow Food Rocks Festival held in San Francisco, California in August 2008

Background information
- Born: Todd George Fancey; Dartmouth, Nova Scotia, Canada
- Origin: Vancouver, British Columbia, Canada
- Genres: Indie rock, power pop
- Occupations: Musician, songwriter
- Instruments: Guitar, bass, vocals

Todd George Fancey is a Canadian guitarist, keyboardist, and solo artist. He is the guitarist for Vancouver-based indie rock band The New Pornographers and the bassist for the band Limblifter. Fancey is originally from Nova Scotia.

== Early life ==
Fancey was born in Dartmouth, Nova Scotia, Canada.

== Solo career ==
Fancey released his first solo album, Fancey on March Records in 2004. His second solo album, Schmancey, was released November 13, 2007, through What Are Records?. Fancey released his third solo album Love Mirage on January 27, 2017. His fourth album release is County Fair a collection of cover songs on January 26, 2018. His third and fourth albums were self-released on Stoner Disco Records.

== Television ==
In 2008, Fancey contributed to the episode of The Office entitled "Dinner Party", providing the voice of Hunter (portrayed on-screen by Nicholas D'Agosto), Jan's administrative assistant, for a song Hunter wrote that is implied, but never confirmed to be, inspired by him losing his virginity to Jan. The song, called 'That One Night," was co-written by Fancey, Gene Stupnitsky and Lee Eisenberg. The episode was nominated for an Emmy Award.

In April 2018, Fancey was interviewed by Rolling Stone's Andy Greene for an article about The Office Dinner Party episode.

In late 2010, NBC hired Fancey to write a song that was featured on NBC's Prime Time Special. Fancey was also hired to create music for Caprica, the Battlestar Galactica TV show prequel.

== Discography ==
Todd Fancey

Solo aka "Fancey"

- Fancey – 2004
- Schmancey – 2007
- Love Mirage – 2017
- County Fair – 2018
- Eyes of Fire – 2021
- Star Dreams (featuring Micae) – 2022

With The New Pornographers

- Electric Version – 2003
- Twin Cinema – 2005
- Challengers – 2007
- Together – 2010
- Brill Bruisers – 2014
- Whiteout Conditions – 2017
- Continue as a Guest – 2023
- The Former Site Of – 2026
