= The New Pornographers =

Canadian indie rock band

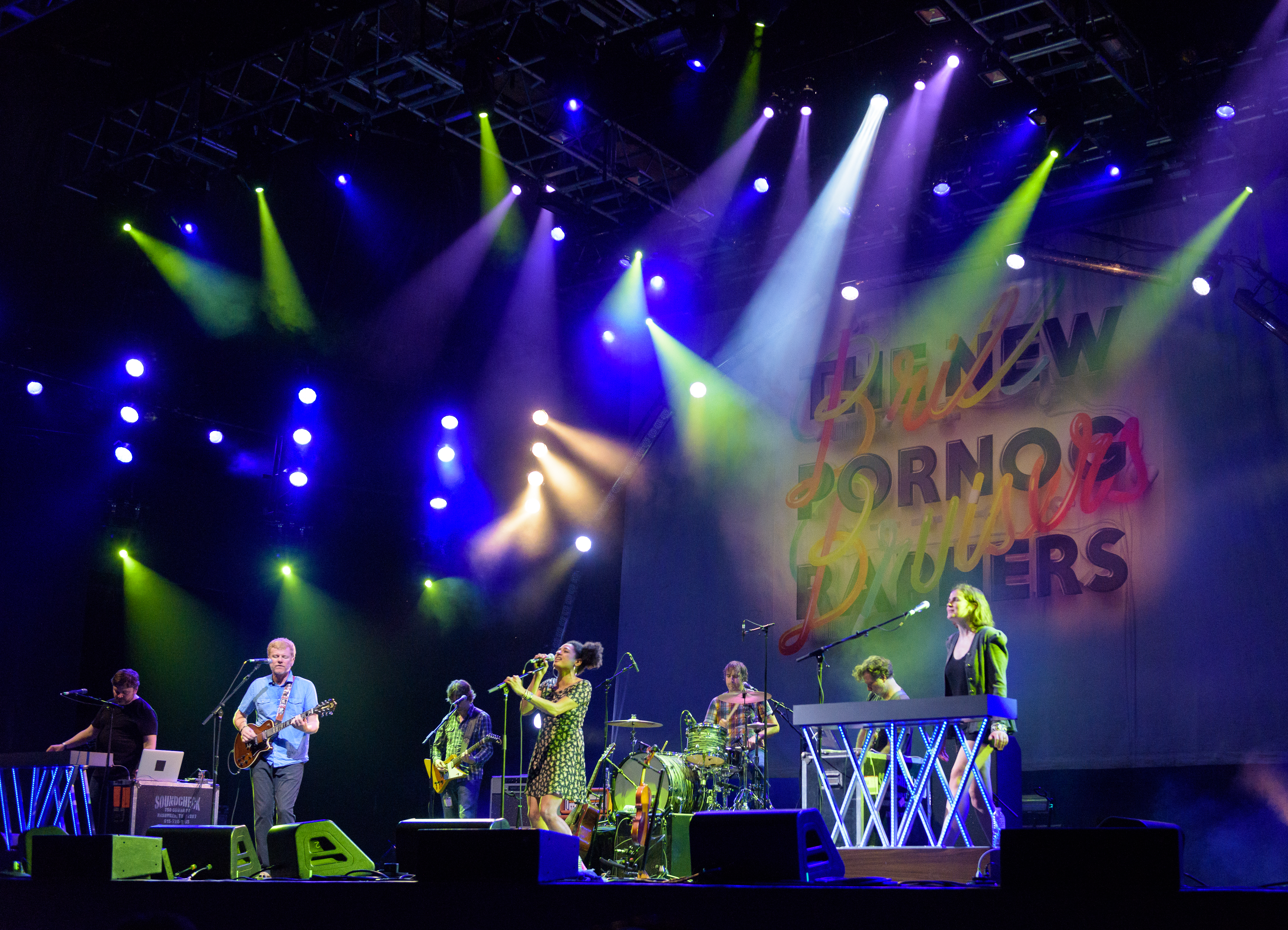
- The New Pornographers at Prospect Park Bandshell, July 11, 2015

Background information
- Origin: Vancouver, British Columbia, Canada
- Genres: Indie rock; power pop; post-punk revival
- Years active: 1997–present
- Labels: Matador; Concord; Mint; Last Gang; Merge
- Spinoffs: Swan Lake; Hello, Blue Roses; case/lang/veirs
- Spinoff of: Destroyer; The Evaporators; Superconductor; Zumpano; Maow; The Corn Sisters; Cub; Thee Crusaders
- Members: Kathryn Calder; Neko Case; John Collins; Todd Fancey; Carl Newman
- Past members: Blaine Thurier; Kurt Dahle; Fisher Rose; Dan Bejar; Joe Seiders
- Website: thenewpornographers.com

The New Pornographers are a Canadian indie rock band, formed in 1997 in Vancouver, British Columbia. Presented as a musical collective and supergroup of singer-songwriters and musicians from multiple projects, the band currently consists of Carl Newman (vocals, guitar), Neko Case (vocals), John Collins (bass), Todd Fancey (guitar), and Kathryn Calder (keyboards, backing vocals).

The band has released ten studio albums to date and have received critical acclaim for their use of multiple vocalists and songwriters, as well as for the elements of power pop incorporated into their music. Pitchfork has described the band's sound as "peppy, gleeful, headstrong guitar pop", while Stereogum has retrospectively praised the band's debut album Mass Romantic as "one of the greatest" power pop albums.

== History ==
The New Pornographers' name was chosen by Carl Newman, who has said that he came up with it because he was a fan of a Japanese film called The Pornographers. It was also an homage to the New Seekers and "The Pornographers," a track on bandmate Dan Bejar's first Destroyer album, We'll Build Them a Golden Bridge. The band has released ten albums to date: Mass Romantic (2000), Electric Version (2003), Twin Cinema (2005), Challengers (2007), Together (2010), Brill Bruisers (2014), Whiteout Conditions (2017), In the Morse Code of Brake Lights (2019), Continue as a Guest (2023), and The Former Site Of. A live album recorded on their 2006 tour is available only at concerts and on the band's website. In 2005, the band was the subject of Reginald Harkema's documentary film Better Off in Bed.

The New Pornographers' first four albums each placed in the top 40 on The Village Voice's Pazz & Jop year-end poll of hundreds of music reviewers. From 2000 to 2006, either a New Pornographers' album or a solo album from one of the band's members ranked in the top 40 on the list each year. In 2007, Blender magazine ranked the New Pornographers' first album, Mass Romantic, the 24th best indie album of all time. In 2009, Rolling Stone magazine ranked the band's second studio album, Electric Version, No. 79 in the "100 Best Albums of the Decade".

In 2004 the band were the subjects of Better Off in Bed, a documentary film by Reginald Harkema about their 2002 concert tour of Western Canada, but were reportedly unhappy with the way they were portrayed in the film and intervened to prevent wider release following its limited distribution on the film festival circuit.

All of the New Pornographers' original members were prominent within the Vancouver music scene prior to forming the band. Kathryn Calder, who is also Newman's niece, joined the band in 2005 largely as a live replacement for Neko Case, whose solo career often left her unavailable to perform with the band. Calder's first lead vocals for the band were on 2007's Challengers, singing the lead on "Failsafe" and sharing the lead with Newman on "Adventures in Solitude".

In 2009, the New Pornographers contributed a cover of the Destroyer song "Hey, Snow White" to the AIDS benefit album Dark Was the Night, produced by the Red Hot Organization. The band released their fifth album, Together, on May 4, 2010, on Matador Records. The album includes collaborations from St. Vincent, Beirut's Zach Condon, and Okkervil River's Will Sheff.

In 2012, the New Pornographers contributed a cover of the song "Think About Me" for the Fleetwood Mac tribute CD called Just Tell Me That You Want Me released by Hear Music. The band's sixth album, Brill Bruisers, was released on August 26, 2014. The album was their highest charting to date in the United States, peaking at #13 on the Billboard 200.

On January 26, 2017, the New Pornographers announced their seventh album, Whiteout Conditions, would be released on April 7. The album was preceded by the single "High Ticket Attractions". The album is the first to feature drummer Joe Seiders as a full-time member after replacing drummer Kurt Dahle in mid-2014. It is also the first New Pornographers album to not feature Dan Bejar. Newman, however, went on the record to note that Bejar's absence did not mean he had left the band entirely; telling Stereogum:

he [Bejar] was right in the middle of doing a Destroyer record... [w]hich was something we'd narrowly skirted for our whole career. I'm always amazed that we managed to. Sometimes we avoided Destroyer, sometimes Destroyer avoided us, but eventually we hit at the same time. It wasn't anything weird.

On November 29, 2018, A.C. Newman announced via Twitter that he had begun work on a future New Pornographers album. On August 2, 2019, the band announced via Twitter that it would release its new album, In the Morse Code of Brake Lights, on September 27, and released its first single from the album, "Falling Down the Stairs of Your Smile". In a press release for the album, Dan Bejar is described as a "former (and possibly future) member" of the band. The new press photos for the band include vocalist/violinist Simi Stone, officially inducting her into the band after being an auxiliary touring member since 2015.

In July 2021, the band announced a North American tour where they would play Mass Romantic and Twin Cinema in full across successive nights, as well as a reissue of Mass Romantic on vinyl. This announcement also confirmed the return of Bejar to the band, as well as the departure of both Thurier and Stone.

On January 9, 2023, A.C. Newman announced via Twitter that the band had moved to a new label, Merge Records, alongside announcing the band's ninth album Continue as a Guest, a single from the album, "Really Really Light", and a tour starting in April. The band's press photos confirmed Bejar's second departure from the group – although he has a co-writing credit on "Really Really Light".

On April 17, 2025, drummer Joe Seiders, who had been with the band since 2014, was arrested in California on child pornography charges, leading the band to immediately fire him. In November 2025, the band confirmed that they would be continuing, and would tour North America in 2026. In an interview with Rolling Stone, Newman also confirmed that Seiders' drum parts for the band's tenth studio album had been scrapped. Charley Drayton overdubbed new drum parts onto the album. In the same interview, Newman expressed a desire to re-record the band's three previous albums in order to remove Seiders' drum parts. In January 2026, the band officially announced their new album, The Former Site Of, and shared its lead single "Votive" following with the two singles "Pure Sticker Shock" released on February 10 and "Spooky Action" on March 2. It was released on March 27, 2026, via Merge.

The fall leg of the band's 2026 tour was complicated when Calder's, Fancey's and Collins' visa renewals were inexplicably delayed. Newman, a permanent U.S. resident, called on Jillette Johnson and monitor tech Noah Harmon (formerly of The Airborne Toxic Event) to join the band for the fall dates.

== Members ==
Members' other projects in brackets

Current members

- Neko Case – lead and backing vocals, percussion (solo artist, Maow, The Corn Sisters, Cub, case/lang/veirs) (1997–present)
- John Collins – bass, guitar, keyboards, backing vocals, percussion (the Evaporators, Destroyer, Thorsen) (1997–present)
- Carl Newman – lead vocals, guitar, keyboards, bass (solo artist (as A.C. Newman), Superconductor, Zumpano, Thee Crusaders) (1997–present)
- Todd Fancey – guitar, backing vocals (solo artist (as Fancey), Limblifter) (2003–present)
- Kathryn Calder – keyboards, backing vocals, guitar (solo artist, Immaculate Machine, Frontperson) (2005–present)

Current touring musicians

- Noah Harmon - backing vocals, bass, mandolin (2026-present)
- Jillette Johnson - backing vocals, keyboards (2026-present)
- Josh Wells – drums (Destroyer, Black Mountain) (2026–present)

Former members

- Fisher Rose – drums (Destroyer, A.C. Newman) (1997–1999)
- Kurt Dahle – drums, percussion, backing vocals (Limblifter, the Age of Electric) (1999–2014)
- Simi Stone – violin, backing vocals, percussion (solo artist, Suffrajett) (2019–2021; touring musician 2015–2019)
- Blaine Thurier – keyboards, synthesizer (independent filmmaker, Thee Crusaders) (1997–2021)
- Dan Bejar – lead vocals, guitar, keyboards, synthesizer (Destroyer, Swan Lake, Hello, Blue Roses) (1997–2017, 2021–2022)
- Joe Seiders – drums, backing vocals (Beat Club) (2014–2025)

Former touring musicians

- Lindsay "Coco" Hames – backing vocals, percussion, acoustic guitar (The Ettes) (2014)
- Nora O'Connor – backing vocals, percussion (The Flat Five) (2021)
- Jess Nolan - backing vocals, keyboards (Jenny Lewis) (2026-present)
- Adam Schatz – saxophone, synthesizer (Japanese Breakfast) (2023)

== Discography ==
=== Studio albums ===
List of studio albums, with selected details and chart positions
| Title | Details | Peak chart positions | | | | | | | |
| Title | Details | CAN | AUS Hit. | SCO | UK | UK Indie | US | US Indie | US Rock |
|---|---|---|---|---|---|---|---|---|---|
| Mass Romantic | Released: November 21, 2000; Label: Mint; Formats: CD, LP | — | — | — | — | — | — | — | — |
| Electric Version | Released: May 6, 2003; Label: Mint/Matador; Formats: CD, LP | 66 | — | — | — | — | 196 | 12 | — |
| Twin Cinema | Released: August 23, 2005; Label: Mint/Matador; Formats: CD, LP | 40 | — | — | — | — | 44 | 5 | — |
| Challengers | Released: August 21, 2007; Label: Matador; Formats: CD, LP | 20 | — | — | 156 | 13 | 34 | 4 | 10 |
| Together | Released: May 4, 2010; Label: Matador; Formats: CD, LP | 14 | 16 | — | 168 | 18 | 18 | 2 | 5 |
| Brill Bruisers | Released: August 26, 2014; Label: Matador; Formats: CD, LP, cassette, streaming | 14 | 3 | 94 | 132 | 32 | 13 | 2 | 3 |
| Whiteout Conditions | Released: April 7, 2017; Label: Concord; Formats: CD, LP, streaming | 82 | 17 | — | — (Note: Whiteout Conditions did not enter the UK Albums Chart, but peaked at number 90 on the UK Albums Chart Update.) | — | 35 | — | 6 |
| In the Morse Code of Brake Lights | Released: September 27, 2019; Label: Concord; Formats: CD, LP, streaming | — | — | — | — | — | 144 | — | 26 |
| Continue as a Guest | Released: March 31, 2023; Label: Merge; Formats: CD, LP, streaming | — | — | — | — (Note: Continue as a Guest did not enter the UK Albums Chart, but peaked at number 87 on the UK Album Downloads Chart.) | 45 | — (Note: Continue as a Guest did not enter the US Billboard 200, but peaked at number 25 on the US Top Album Sales Chart.) | — | — |
| The Former Site Of | Released: March 27, 2026; Label: Merge; Formats: CD, LP, streaming | — | — | — | — (Note: The Former Site Of did not enter the UK Albums Chart, but peaked at number 51 on the UK Album Downloads Chart.) | — (Note: The Former Site Of did not enter the UK Independent Albums Chart, but peaked at number 15 on the UK Independent Album Breakers Chart.) | — | — | — |
"—" denotes a release that did not chart or was not released in that territory.

=== Live albums ===
- Live Session (iTunes Exclusive) (2005)
- Live! (2006)
- LIVE from SoHo (iTunes Exclusive) (2008)

=== Singles ===
List of singles, with selected chart positions
| Title | Year | Peak chart positions | | | | | | Album |
| Title | Year | CAN Rock | AUT | US AAA | US Rock Air | MEX Air | UK | Album |
|---|---|---|---|---|---|---|---|---|
| "Letter from an Occupant" | 2002 | — | — | — | — | — | 139 | Mass Romantic |
| "High Art, Local News" | 2005 | — | — | — | — | — | — | Twin Cinema |
| "Twin Cinema" | 2005 | — | — | — | — | — | — | Twin Cinema |
| "Use It" | 2005 | — | — | — | — | — | — | Twin Cinema |
| "Sing Me Spanish Techno" | 2005 | — | — | — | — | — | — | Twin Cinema |
| "Challengers" | 2007 | — | — | — | — | — | — | Challengers |
| "My Rights Versus Yours" | 2007 | — | — | — | — | — | — | Challengers |
| "The Spirit of Giving" | 2007 | — | — | — | — | — | — | Non-album single |
| "Myriad Harbour" | 2008 | — | — | — | — | — | — | Challengers |
| "Mutiny, I Promise You" | 2008 | — | — | — | — | — | — | Challengers |
| "Hey, Snow White" | 2009 | — | 46 | — | — | — | — | Dark Was the Night |
| "Your Hands (Together)" | 2010 | 43 | — | — | — | 16 | — | Together |
| "Crash Years" | 2010 | — | — | — | — | — | — | Together |
| "Togetherness" | 2010 | — | — | — | — | — | — | Non-album single |
| "Moves" | 2011 | — | — | — | — | — | — | Together |
| "Up in the Dark" | 2011 | — | — | — | — | — | — | Together |
| "Brill Bruisers" | 2014 | 24 | — | — | — | — | — | Brill Bruisers |
| "War on the East Coast" | 2014 | — | — | — | — | — | — | Brill Bruisers |
| "Dancehall Domine" | 2014 | — | — | — | — | — | — | Brill Bruisers |
| "Champions of Red Wine" | 2015 | — | — | — | — | — | — | Brill Bruisers |
| "High Ticket Attractions" | 2017 | 27 | — | 5 | 49 | — | — | Whiteout Conditions |
| "This Is the World of the Theatre" | 2017 | — | — | — | — | — | — | Whiteout Conditions |
| "Whiteout Conditions" | 2017 | — | — | 24 | — | — | — | Whiteout Conditions |
| "Falling Down the Stairs of Your Smile" | 2019 | — | — | 12 | — | — | — | In the Morse Code of Brake Lights |
| "The Surprise Knock" | 2019 | — | — | — | — | — | — | In the Morse Code of Brake Lights |
| "One Kind of Solomon" | 2019 | — | — | — | — | — | — | In the Morse Code of Brake Lights |
| "Really Really Light" | 2023 | — | — | 24 | — | — | — | Continue as a Guest |
| "Angelcover" | 2023 | — | — | — | — | — | — | Continue as a Guest |
| "Pontius Pilate's Home Movies" | 2023 | — | — | — | — | — | — | Continue as a Guest |
| "Votive" | 2026 | — | — | — | — | — | — | The Former Site Of |
"—" denotes a release that did not chart or was not released in that territory.

=== Contributions with non-LP songs ===
- FUBAR: The Album (2002) – "Your Daddy Don't Know"
- Matador at Fifteen (2004) – "Graceland"
- Dark Was the Night (2009) – "Hey, Snow White"
- Burn Notice: The Fall of Sam Axe (2011) - "Hey, Snow White"
- Just Tell Me That You Want Me: A Tribute to Fleetwood Mac (2012) – "Think About Me"

=== Other contributions ===
- Queer as Folk (2000) – "Mass Romantic"
- Jay and Silent Bob Strike Back (2001) – "Letter from an Occupant"
- Men with Brooms (2002) – "Mass Romantic"
- CBC Radio 3 Sessions, Vol. 1 (2004) – "The Fake Headlines"
- Prom Queen: The Marc Hall Story (2004) – "Mass Romantic"
- The Office (Season 2, Episode 7: "The Client") (2005) – "Use It"
- Weeds (2005) – "The Laws Have Changed"
- Waiting... (2005) – "Electric Version"
- Gilmore Girls (2004) – "The Laws Have Changed"
- Gilmore Girls (2005) – "Twin Cinema"
- The Hour (Main Title Theme Season 3) (2006) – "Use It"
- Chuck (Season 1, Episode 2: "Chuck Versus the Helicopter") (2007) – "Challengers"
- Heroes (Season 2, Episode 6: "The Line") (2007) – "All for Swinging You Around"
- Rock Band (2007) – "Electric Version", "Use It", "All the Things That Go to Make Heaven and Earth" (DLC)
- University of Phoenix commercial (2007) – "The Bleeding Heart Show"
- Stone of Destiny (2008) – "Mutiny, I Promise You"
- NBA playoffs (2008) – "Use It"
- Numb3rs (2008) – "Challengers"
- Secret Diary of a Call Girl (Series 2, Episode 2) (2008) – "Adventures in Solitude"
- Management (2009) – "Adventures in Solitude", "All the Old Showstoppers"
- Ugly Betty (2010) – "Adventures in Solitude"
- The Good Wife (Season 2, Episode 13) (2011) – "Testament to Youth in Verse"
- Amazon Kindle commercial – "Sweet Talk, Sweet Talk"
- T-Mobile commercial (2011) – "Moves"
- Hyundai commercial (Canada) – "Moves"
- Go On (opening credits) (2012) – "Moves"
- Between (Season 1, Episode 1) (2015) – "Moves"
- Speechless (Season 1, Episode 22: "M-A-- MAY-JAY") (2017) – "Dancehall Domine"
- Blindspot (Season 3, Episode 1) – "The Bleeding Heart Show"
- Daybreak (Season 1, Episode 9) – "Adventures in Solitude"

== See also ==
- Canadian rock
- List of bands from British Columbia
- Music of Vancouver
