= Joe Seiders =

American drummer

- Seiders in 2015

Background information
- Born: Joseph Paul Seiders; 1979 or 1980; Winchester, Massachusetts, United States
- Occupations: Drummer, singer, composer
- Instruments: Drums, keyboard, accordion
- Years active: 1993–2025
- Formerly of: The New Pornographers

Joseph Paul Seiders (born 1979 or 1980) is an American former touring/session multi-instrumentalist and convicted sex offender. He is best known as the drummer and backing vocalist for The New Pornographers from 2014 to 2025, when he was fired after being arrested for possession of child pornography.

Primarily a drummer, Seiders also sings, plays keyboards, accordion, and guitar. Seiders was born in Winchester, Massachusetts, and grew up in Derry, New Hampshire, attending Pinkerton Academy. Having a father who also played drums, he developed an interest in the drum kit at a very young age. He was also classically trained on piano from the age of five.

He has toured, recorded, and worked with a variety of artists, including The New Pornographers, Neko Case, Emitt Rhodes, John Oates, Tracy Bonham, Juliana Hatfield, Chris Mann, Gary Jules, Bleu, Josh Kaufman, Night Terrors of 1927, Val McCallum, among many others.

Seiders' percussion, accordion, and vocal talents were also featured in the 2015 Disney film, Tinker Bell and the Legend of the NeverBeast.

Seiders is also known as an avid mixologist.

== Legal issues ==
In April 2025, Seiders was arrested for charges including possession of child pornography after two incidents in a Chick-fil-A in Palm Desert, California. In one incident, an 11-year-old told deputies that a man in the restroom recorded him on his cell phone. Two days later, an employee told deputies a man was entering and exiting the restroom with minors. Police executed search warrants on Seiders' home, car and cell phone and found evidence implicating him in the incidents, along with evidence he possessed child pornography. Following the arrest, The New Pornographers confirmed that Seiders was no longer a member of the band.

Two additional minor victims later came forward, unrelated to the April incident.

Seiders pleaded guilty in June 2025 to charges including felony possession of child pornography. He was sentenced that September to three years in state prison.
