= Blaine Thurier =

Canadian musician and film producer (born 1967)

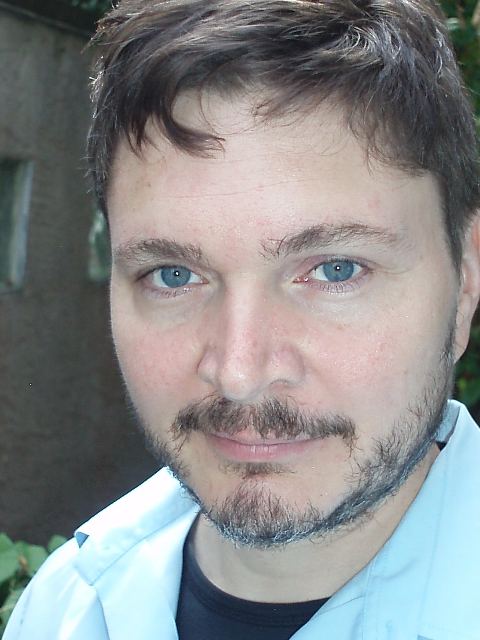
- Thurier in August 2009

Background information
- Born: 1967 (age 58–59); Estevan, Saskatchewan, Canada
- Origin: Vancouver, British Columbia, Canada
- Genres: Indie rock, power pop
- Occupations: Musician, director, writer, editor
- Instrument: Synthesizer
- Years active: 1997–present
- Formerly of: The New Pornographers

Blaine Thurier (born 1967) is a Canadian musician and filmmaker. He played synthesizer with the Canadian indie pop supergroup The New Pornographers from their inception in 1997 up to 2021. He also directed several music videos for the band during his tenure. Thurier has written and directed feature films, which have been screened at the Toronto International Film Festival (TIFF), South by Southwest Film Festival, Slamdance and other festivals. Thurier served as a 2011 panelist for the TIFF.

== Personal life ==
Thurier was born in 1967 Estevan, Saskatchewan, Canada. He lives in Vancouver with his wife and son.

== Career ==
Thurier considers filmmaking his main creative outlet, while treating music as a job. He plays synthesizer with the Canadian indie pop supergroup The New Pornographers. Thurier has directed three of the band's videos "Use It", "All For Swinging You Around" and "The Laws Have Changed".

=== Feature films ===
Thurier's first full-length feature Low Self-Esteem Girl premiered at the September 2000 Toronto International Film Festival. Thurier used the attention from his film debut to promote The New Pornographers who were still a few months away from releasing their debut album Mass Romantic. The film was awarded Best Narrative Feature at the South by Southwest Film Festival.

Thurier's second full-length feature, a comedy, Male Fantasy, was screened at the 2004 Toronto International Film Festival. It was released to DVD in 2008. A Gun to the Head, a crime comedy, was Thurier's third full-length feature film. Thurier's fourth film 12 Takes was made in 2010. It is a short documentary.

== Filmography ==
=== Music videos ===
Year	Title	Notes
2003	"The Laws Have Changed"	from the album Electric Version
2003	"All For Swinging You Around"	from the album Electric Version
2005	"Use It"	from the album Twin Cinema

=== Features ===
Year	Film	Role	Notes
2000	Low Self-Esteem Girl	Screenwriter; Producer; Director; Editor; Sound; Casting director Cinematographer	Best Narrative Feature at the SXSW Film Festival
2004	Male Fantasy	Screenwriter, Producer, Director, Editor	
2009	A Gun to the Head	Lester	Screenwriter; Director
2012	12 Takes	Editor	TV documentary Segment: "Carl Newman"
2014	Teen Lust	Director	
2015	A Matter of Time	Himself	TV film
2021	Kicking Blood	Director	

=== Shorts ===
- 2010 – 12 Takes
- 2020 – Sing, O Muse

== See also ==
- Canadian rock
- List of Canadian musicians
- List of Canadian directors
