= Music of Saskatchewan =

Music of Saskatchewan, one of the Canadian prairie provinces, includes a variety of genres including Indigenous music, folk, country, jazz, and classical traditions.

== History ==
In the early days of settlement, the musical landscape of the province was defined by military and police bands, church choirs, immigrant teachers, and many travelling groups of artists who travelled by rail across the continent.

== Cultural centres ==
=== Regina ===
Regina was incorporated in 1883, and became the provincial capital in 1905. Early in its history, the city boasted numerous bands, including a brass band, Musical and Dramatic Society and a number of church choirs.

Frank L. Laubach, a professional Scottish musician arrived in Regina in 1904, and was a prominent figure for eighteen years. During that time, he founded the Regina Philharmonic Society (1904), the Regina Orchestral Society (1908), the Regina Operatic Society (1909) and the province-wide Saskatchewan Music Festival (1908, with F. W. Chisholm).

After Laubach's retirement in 1922, three choral and orchestra society groups exist: Regina Symphony Orchestra, Regina Male Voice Choir and Regina Choral Society. Only two years later, the three societies again merged to form the Regina Philharmonic Association. The Regina Symphony Orchestra later departed from that association, in 1926.

Musicians from Regina include Edith Fowke, Stu Davis, Colin James, Muriel Kerr, Owen Underhill, Jack Semple, Dagan Harding (formerly of Despistado and Geronimo), and Kenny Shields of Streetheart.

Bands from Regina include The Dead South, Ghosts of Modern Man, Into Eternity, Library Voices, and Rah Rah.

William Earl Brown founded the Soundaround label starting in the 1960s which featured many of the local country and ethnic bands recording in his basement studio. Mel West & The Meteors, and The Canadian Downbeats had a few singles on the Soundaround label, later picked up Canada-wide via Stan Klees' "Red Leaf" label. Mel West & The Meteors would chart Canada wide with their tracks "Sad & Blue" and "Seventh Saint". Earl had later success with the Grand Coulee Old Tyme Jug Band, and sold a number of albums via TV infomercials in the 1980s.

=== Saskatoon ===
The city of Saskatoon was founded in 1882 and incorporated in 1903. During that time, the city's population grew swiftly. In the early 20th century, operettas by Gilbert & Sullivan, vaudeville and minstrel shows were among the most common forms of musical performance. Saskatoon's first concert was held on December 1, 1884, by the Pioneer Society. It featured solos, duets, choruses, readings, and recitations.

The Saskatoon Philharmonic Society was founded in 1908, and won a prize at the first Saskatchewan Music Festival in 1909. The number of professional groups continued to grow. The Saskatoon Oratorio Society was founded in 1913, performing Handel's Messiah with nearly 200 singers at Third Avenue Methodist Church in December 1913. The Saskatoon Symphony Orchestra formed under that name in 1931, after several earlier attempts to form an orchestra had occurred.

With the Great Depression in the early 1930s the musical community suffered. However, private teacher Lyell Gustin and his students presented twenty concerts a year in Saskatoon during the thirties, as well as teaching in surrounding areas. The Western Board of Music was organized in 1936, led by Arthur Collingwood, Chair of Music at the University of Saskatchewan. The music festival movement continued to expand, and in 1936 the Music Teachers’ Association was established.

The Celebrity Concert Series, held by the Saskatoon Kinsmen Club, began, in 1944, to introduce international celebrities every year for twenty-six years. Other groups include the Saskatoon Lyric Theatre Society (active 1955), the Saskatoon Opera Association (founded 1978), and the Prairie Opera Inc. (founded 1986). At the University of Saskatchewan, the student chorus the Greystone Singers was founded in 1959. Alumni of the Greystone Singers founded the Saskatoon Chamber Singers in 1977.

Musicians from Saskatoon include Joni Mitchell, Neil Chotem, Jon Ballantyne, Brenton Price Dutton, Susan Pesklevits Jacks, Lorraine McAllister Richards, Irene Bubniuk, Brenda Baker, Chris Lindgren, Paddy Tutty, Kyle Riabko, Lesia Zubrack Romanoff, Mike Ferbey (of the Rhythm Pals), and Walter Babiak.

Bands from Saskatoon include One Bad Son, The Sheepdogs, and Wide Mouth Mason.

In 2004, Theresa Sokyrka, born in Moose Jaw and since moved to Saskatoon, became first runner-up in the second season of Canadian Idol with her jazz and blues-influenced musicianship. Lionel Richie, appearing on one episode, said that Sokyrka had inside her the soul of an old black woman.

=== Moose Jaw ===
Moose Jaw is home to the Moose Jaw Band and Choral Festival, which has been held every year since 1950. The city co-hosted the Juno Awards of 2013. Connect-22, billed as Saskatchewan's 22nd and Final Electronic & Tribal Music Festival is scheduled for Besant Campground near Moose Jaw in 2017.

== Bands from Saskatchewan ==
=== Public bands ===
The Saskatoon Concert Band is a civilian public band based in the city, consisting of two bands: the concert band and the auxiliary band. The Saskatoon Auxiliary Concert Band was formed in 1987 to cater to a demographic of musicians who came out of retirement. The Saskatoon Concert Band was founded in 1949 as the 406 Wing Band of the Royal Canadian Air Force and would later be renamed as the 23rd Wing Band. During this era, it took part in the Canadian National Exhibition as well as performing jointly with Mexican solo trumpeter Rafael Méndez as a guest artist. 10 years later, it was dissolved to create the Kinsmen Concert Band. In the mid-1960s, a section from the band came back into military service, this time as the HMCS Unicorn Band in the Royal Canadian Navy. The band evolved into its current form in 1982 as a non-profit organization.

The band took part Saskatchewan's Centennial year celebrations, during which it toured Northern Saskatchewan, as well as performed at events in the Saskatchewan Legislature.

=== Other bands and artists ===
- The Age of Electric
- Bombargo
- Breach of Trust
- Jordan Cook
- Stu Davis
- The Dead South
- The Deep Dark Woods
- Despistado
- Ghosts of Modern Man
- The Holly Springs Disaster
- Hunter Brothers
- I Spy
- Tom Jackson
- Colin James
- Brad Johner
- The Johner Brothers
- Kacy & Clayton
- Connie Kaldor
- Kick Axe
- Chad Klinger
- Melanie Laine
- Library Voices
- Means
- Andrea Menard
- Maybe Smith
- Jess Moskaluke
- Megan Nash
- The Northern Pikes
- One Bad Son
- Donny Parenteau
- The Poverty Plainsmen
- Queen City Kids
- Rah Rah
- Kyle Riabko
- Jessica Robinson
- Jack Semple
- Andy Shauf
- The Sheepdogs
- Slow Down, Molasses
- Static in Stereo
- Streetheart
- Joey Stylez
- Sylvie
- Sympathy
- Jon Vickers
- The Waltons
- Colter Wall
- Wide Mouth Mason

== Festivals ==
- Regina Folk Festival (Regina), 1969–present
- Craven Country Jamboree, (Craven) 1983–; in collaboration with Country Thunder Music Festival as of 2016
- Sasktel Saskatchewan Jazz Fest, 1989–
- Ness Creek Music Festival (Ness Creek), 1991–
- Long Day's Night Music Festival (Swift Current) 2003–Present
- Connect Music Festival (Besant), electronic, 1995–2017
- Gateway Music Festival (Bengough), 2005–
- All Folk'd Up (Montmartre), 2010–
- Grilledcheesapolooza Music Festival (Kindersley), 2010–
- MazzFest (Saskatoon), hardcore punk festival, 2010–
- MoSo Fest (Saskatoon), 2011–
- Noise Fest (Regina), punk, hardcore and rock, 2014–
- Phantasm Festival, electronic music, 2014–
