= List of Edgefest lineups =

This is a list of Edgefest lineups, sorted by year. Edgefest was a rock festival that occurred annually in Canada (most frequently at Molson Park in Barrie and in Toronto) from 1987 to 2006 and from 2008 to 2015.

Edgefest was created by CFNY-FM employees Phil Evans, Kneale Mann, Alan Cross, Scot Turner, and Earl Veale.

== Line-ups ==
=== 1987 ===
Location: Molson Park, Barrie.

Date: July 1, 1987.

- Teenage Head
- The Pursuit of Happiness
- The Saints
- Blue Rodeo
- Carole Pope
- Breeding Ground
- Images in Vogue
- The Northern Pikes
- Sattalites
- Pukka Orchestra
- The Spoons
- Vis A Vis
- Eight Seconds

=== 1988 ===
Location: Molson Park, Barrie.

Date: July 1, 1988.

- Parachute Club
- The Razorbacks
- The Pursuit of Happiness
- Eugene Ripper
- 54-40
- The Mighty Lemon Drops
- Manteca
- Underworld
- Andrew Cash
- Timbuk 3
- Chalk Circle
- Hugh Marsh

=== 1989 ===
Location: Molson Park, Barrie.

Date: July 1, 1989.

- Jeff Healey Band
- The Tragically Hip
- Dalbello
- Chalk Circle
- Sass Jordan
- National Velvet
- Andrew Cash
- Sarah McLachlan
- Spoons
- Sons of Freedom
- Jeffrey Hatcher and the Big Beat
- Carole Pope

=== 1990 ===
Location: Molson Park, Barrie.

Date: July 1, 1990.

- The Box
- Skydiggers
- Lava Hay
- The Tragically Hip
- Satallites
- 54-40
- Crash Vegas
- The Pursuit of Happiness
- The Northern Pikes
- The Grapes of Wrath
- National Velvet

=== 1991 ===
Location: Molson Park, Barrie.

Date: July 1, 1991.

- Blue Rodeo
- Violent Femmes
- Dream Warriors
- Crash Test Dummies
- Skydiggers
- Spirit of the West
- Teenage Head
- Bootsauce
- King Apparatus
- Skaface

=== 1992 ===
Location: Molson Park, Barrie.

Date: July 1, 1992.

- Spinal Tap
- 54-40
- Leslie Spit Treeo
- Bootsauce
- Slik Toxik
- Amanda Marshall
- The Tragically Hip
- Sass Jordan
- Sons of Freedom

=== 1993 ===
Location: Ontario Place Forum, Toronto.

Dates: July 1-2, 1993.

July 1:

- Rheostatics
- The Lowest of the Low
- The Waltons
- Crash Vegas
- The Watchmen
- hHead
- Odds
- Change of Heart
- Shadowy Men on a Shadowy Planet
- Me Mom & Morgentaler
- Corky and the Juice Pigs
- Sara Craig
- Ginger
- Gregory Hoskins and the Stickpeople
- 13 Engines
- King Apparatus
- Wild Strawberries (second stage)
- Rymes with Orange (second stage)
- Scott B. Sympathy (second stage)
- The Lawn (second stage)
- One (second stage)
- 49 Acres (second stage)
- Jale (second stage)
- The Smalls (second stage)

July 2:

- Radiohead
- Ned's Atomic Dustbin
- Judybats
- Furnaceface
- Stereo MC's

=== 1994 ===
Location: Ontario Place Fourm, Toronto.

Date: July 1, 1994.

- The Lemonheads
- The Proclaimers
- 13 Engines
- hHead
- The Watchmen
- One
- The Killjoys
- Toad the Wet Sprocket
- Lost Dakotas
- Wild Strawberries
- Brett Brothers
- King Cobb Steelie
- The Gandharvas
- Moist

Second stage:

- Project 9
- Venus Cures All
- Adam West
- Wooden Stars

=== 1995 ===
Location: Molson Amphitheatre, Toronto.

Dates: May 21 (Edgefest I), July 1 (Edgefest II), August 5 (Edgefest III).

Edgefest I:

- Our Lady Peace
- Elastica
- Ned's Atomic Dustbin
- Blur

Edgefest II:

- 54-40
- The Watchmen
- Odds
- Crash Vegas
- Junkhouse
- Headstones
- Treble Charger
- hHead

Edgefest III:

Main stage:

- Sloan
- 13 Engines
- Treble Charger
- The Killjoys
- Change of Heart
- Rusty
- The Super Friendz
- Ma
- Jale
- The Hardship Post
- Pluto
- Thrush Hermit
- Adam West
- Sugar Ray
- Mystery Machine
- Zumpano
- Glueleg
- Made

Side stage:

- Project 9
- Smoother
- Six Finger Satellite
- The Morganfields
- Shallow
- Huevos Rancheros
- Stinkin' Rich
- The Monoxides
- Local Rabbits
- Plumtree
- Subtractor

=== 1996 ===
Location: Molson Park, Barrie.

Date: June 30, 1996.

Main stage:

- The Tea Party
- 54-40
- Our Lady Peace
- Ashley MacIsaac
- I Mother Earth
- 13 Engines
- The Killjoys
- Big Sugar

Second stage:

- Rusty
- Weeping Tile
- The Mahones
- Limblifter
- Sunfish
- Sandbox
- Barstool Prophets

=== 1997 ===
Dates: June 28 (Barrie), June 29 (Montreal), June 30 (Ottawa), August 25 (Vancouver), August 27 (Calgary), August 29 (Edmonton), August 30 (Saskatoon), September 1 (Winnipeg).

Main stage:

- Our Lady Peace
- The Tea Party
- I Mother Earth
- Collective Soul
- Dodgy (Vancouver, Calgary, Edmonton, Saskatoon, Winnipeg)
- The Philosopher Kings (Vancouver, Calgary, Edmonton, Saskatoon, Winnipeg)
- Holly McNarland (Barrie, Montreal, Ottawa)
- Silverchair (Vancouver, Calgary, Edmonton)
- BTK (Barrie, Ottawa)
- The Verve Pipe (Barrie)
- Groovy Aardvark (Montreal)
- Plume (Montreal)
- Nancy Dumais (Montreal)

Second stage:

- Glueleg
- The Age of Electric
- Finger Eleven
- Sara Craig (all except Montreal)
- Econoline Crush (Vancouver, Calgary, Edmonton, Saskatoon, Winnipeg)
- Zuckerbaby (Barrie, Ottawa)
- Mollies Revenge (Barrie, Ottawa)
- Les Secretaires Volantes (Montreal)
- Go Van Gogh (Montreal)
- Holfader (Montreal)
- Mrs. Torrance (Montreal)

Cake, Kinnie Starr and Redd Kross were originally scheduled to perform on the tour but cancelled their performances.

=== 1998 ===
Dates: June 29 (Ottawa), June 30 (Montreal), July 1 (Barrie), July 4 (Winnipeg), July 5 (Saskatoon), July 8 (Edmonton), July 9 (Calgary), July 11 (Vancouver).

Main stage:

- The Tea Party
- Green Day
- Foo Fighters
- Sloan
- Econoline Crush
- Holly McNarland (Winnipeg, Saskatoon, Edmonton, Calgary, Vancouver)
- Moist (Ottawa, Montreal, Barrie)
- Bif Naked (Ottawa, Barrie, Calgary)
- Local Rabbits (Vancouver)

Second stage:

- The Watchmen
- Creed
- Matthew Good Band
- The Killjoys
- Copyright (Winnipeg, Saskatoon, Edmonton, Calgary, Vancouver)
- Local Rabbits (Winnipeg, Saskatoon, Edmonton, Calgary)
- Sandbox (Ottawa, Montreal, Barrie, Winnipeg)
- The Inbreds (Ottawa, Montreal, Barrie)
- Bif Naked (Montreal, Vancouver)
- Refuel (Montreal)
- Rusty (Barrie)

Other bands who performed on the tour:

- New Meanies (Ottawa, Montreal)
- Tripping Daisy (Ottawa, Montreal)

Lineups varied for each show. Headstones were originally scheduled to perform on the tour but ended up not performing.

=== 1999 ===
Dates: July 1-2 (Barrie), July 3 (Ottawa), July 7 (Winnipeg), July 9 (Calgary), July 10 (Saskatoon), July 11 (Edmonton), July 14 (Vancouver).

Main stage:

- Moist
- Matthew Good Band
- Wide Mouth Mason
- Big Wreck
- Edwin
- Hole
- Silverchair
- Rascalz

Village stage:

- Finger Eleven
- Treble Charger
- Serial Joe
- Vertical Horizon
- Len
- Gob (July 1-3)
- Bodega (July 1)

A show in Montreal was originally scheduled but was cancelled due to scheduling conflicts. Eve 6 were originally scheduled to perform on the tour but cancelled due to lead singer Max Collins having throat problems.

=== 2000 ===
Location: Molson Park, Barrie.

Date: July 1, 2000.

Main stage:

- Filter
- Creed
- The Tea Party
- Matthew Good Band
- Goldfinger
- Serial Joe
- Headstones
- Limblifter

Village stage:

- 3 Doors Down
- The Flashing Lights
- Dunk
- Jet Set Satellite
- Pocket Dwellers
- J Englishman
- Flicker
- Nickelback
- Odin Red

=== 2001 ===
Dates: July 1 (Barrie), August 18 (Vancouver), August 21 (Calgary), August 22 (Edmonton), August 25 (Toronto), August 26 (Ottawa), August 28 (Quebec City), August 29 (Montreal).

Barrie:

Edgefest stage:

- 3 Doors Down
- Bif Naked
- Big Wreck
- Finger Eleven
- Gob
- Project Wyze
- The Tea Party
- Tool

Edge Feature stage:

- Mudmen
- Joydrop
- Flybanger
- LiveonRelease
- Smoother
- Rubberman
- Staggered Crossing
- Sevendust
- Static in Stereo

Edge Emerging stage:

- Billy Talent
- Blurtonia
- Breach of Trust
- By Divine Right
- Constabble Brennan
- DJ Serious
- Nice Cat
- Puddy
- Rocket Science
- The Black Halos
- The Dears
- Tuuli
- 66 Kicks

August Tour:

- Blink-182
- New Found Glory
- Sum 41
- Jimmy Eat World
- Good Charlotte
- Millencolin
- Project Wyze
- Simple Plan
- Shocore (Vancouver)
- Flu (Calgary)
- Crushing Jane (Edmonton)

=== 2002 ===
Dates: Edgefest: July 1 (Barrie). Edgefest II: July 23 (Edmonton), August 22 (Ottawa), September 1 (Grand Bend), September 2 (Montreal), September 13 (London), September 13 (Vancouver), September 13-14 (Halifax).

Edgefest:

Main stage:

- Nickelback
- Cake
- Finger Eleven
- Goldfinger
- Default
- Sevendust
- Simple Plan
- Jerry Cantrell

Silverchair were originally scheduled to perform but cancelled because of lead singer Daniel Johns' reoccurring reactive arthritis.

Second stage:

- Danny Michel
- The Dears
- The Full Nine
- Grade
- Headstrong
- Melissa Auf der Maur's Hand of Doom
- Mudmen
- Not by Choice
- Robin Black and the Intergalactic Rock Stars
- The Weekend
- GrimSkunk
- Tuuli
- Custom

Third stage:

- 30 Seconds to Mars
- Billy Talent
- Joel Plaskett
- Grindig
- Three Days Grace
- Trouser
- Theory of a Deadman
- Flashlight Brown
- Flicker
- Epidemic
- Greenwheel
- Injected
- One 976
- Jersey

Fourth stage:

- Sudden
- Microbunny
- Al Okada
- Alistair
- Abs & Fase
- Ghetto Concept
- MistaCronks
- G Stokes
- Graph Nobel
- Toy Box

Edgefest II:

Edmonton:

- Simple Plan
- Gob
- Bif Naked
- LiveonRelease

Ottawa:

- Bif Naked
- Simple Plan
- Tuuli
- Flashlight Brown

Grand Bend:

- The Watchmen
- Sam Roberts
- Crush
- The Weekend

Montreal:

- Slayer
- Soulfly
- In Flames
- Downthesun

London:

- Matthew Good
- Bif Naked
- Flashlight Brown

Vancouver:

- Slayer
- Soulfly
- In Flames
- Downthesun

Halifax:

- Matthew Good
- Sloan
- De La Soul
- The New Deal
- Crush
- Rascalz
- Swollen Members
- The Mighty Mighty Bosstones
- The Lowest Of The Low
- Blackout 77
- Creeper
- Project Wyze

An Edgefest II in Toronto featuring Jimmy Eat World, Gob, Constantines, Midtown, Hot Rod Circuit, Moneen and Hot Hot Heat was scheduled but was cancelled due to scheduling difficulties.

=== 2003 ===
Location: Molson Park, Barrie.

Date: September 6, 2003.

- The Tragically Hip
- Our Lady Peace
- Stereophonics
- Sloan
- Fefe Dobson
- Finger Eleven
- Thornley
- Jersey

=== 2004 ===
Location: Molson Amphitheatre, Toronto.

Date: July 2, 2004.

- Good Charlotte
- Finger Eleven
- Billy Talent
- Jet
- Alexisonfire
- Something Corporate
- Jersey
- The Salads

=== 2005 ===
Location: Molson Amphitheatre, Toronto.

Date: July 1, 2005.

Main stage:

- Billy Talent
- Alexisonfire
- Rise Against
- Story of the Year
- Coheed and Cambria
- Killradio
- Boy
- Jakalope

Next Big Thing stage:

- Social Code
- The Junction
- The Reason
- Out of Your Mouth
- The Waking Eyes

Underground Operations Side stage:

- Closet Monster
- Bombs Over Providence
- Hostage Life
- Dead Letter Department
- The Flatliners
- Brat Attack

=== 2006 ===
Location: Molson Amphitheatre, Toronto.

Dates: July 1 (Edgefest I), July 16 (Edgefest II).

Edgefest I:

Main stage:

- Our Lady Peace
- Keane
- Hot Hot Heat
- Neverending White Lights
- Mobile
- Evans Blue

Next Big Thing stage:

- Magneta Lane
- Die Mannequin
- Jets Overhead
- Dearly Beloved
- Pedestrian
- The Illuminati

Edgefest II:

Main stage:

- Yellowcard
- The All-American Rejects
- Hawthorne Heights
- Story Of The Year
- Matchbook Romance
- Illscarlett
- Anberlin

Next Big Thing stage:

- The Meligrove Band
- Magneta Lane
- The Miniatures
- Panic and The Rebel Emergency
- In-Flight Safety
- Tokyo Police Club

The Bedlam Society/Dine Alone/Distort stage:

- The Junction
- Cancer Bats
- Attack in Black
- Johnny Truant

=== 2008 ===
Location: Downsview Park, Toronto.

Date: July 12, 2008.

- Linkin Park
- Stone Temple Pilots
- Sam Roberts
- The Bravery
- Ashes Divide
- Attack in Black
- Arkells
- The Coast
- Creature
- The Flatliners
- Hostage Life
- Modernboys Moderngirls
- The Stereohoax
- Sweet Thing
- Ubiquitous Synergy Seeker
- Alpha Galates

=== 2009 ===
Location: Downsview Park, Toronto.

Date: June 20, 2009.

- Billy Talent
- AFI
- Alexisonfire
- Metric
- K-OS
- The Stills
- Arkells
- Beast
- Clothes Make the Man
- Dean Lickyer
- Dinosaur Bones
- Flash Lightnin'
- La Casa Muerte
- The Midway State
- Moneen
- Still Life Still
- The Waking Eyes

=== 2011 ===
Location: Downsview Park, Toronto.

Date: July 9, 2011.

Main stage:

- Rise Against
- A Perfect Circle
- The Weakerthans
- Tokyo Police Club
- Arkells
- The Reason
- Dinosaur Bones

Second stage:

- Hollerado
- KO
- Gentlemen Husbands
- Harlan Pepper
- Michou
- Mockingbird Wish Me Luck
- Monster Truck
- Sandman Viper Command
- The Sheepdogs

=== 2012 ===
Location: Downsview Park, Toronto.

Date: July 14, 2012.

Main stage:

- Death From Above 1979
- Billy Talent
- Silversun Pickups
- The Pack A.D.
- The Sheepdogs
- Young the Giant
- The Dirty Heads
- Ubiquitous Synergy Seeker

Side stage:

- The Darcys
- Said the Whale
- Library Voices
- The Balconies
- Acres of Lions
- The Coppertone
- Hacienda
- Indian Handcrafts
- Whale Tooth
- Yukon Blonde

=== 2013 ===
Location: Downsview Park, Toronto.

Date: July 31, 2013.

Main stage:

- The Lumineers
- Band of Horses
- The Neighbourhood
- Monster Truck
- Mother Mother
- Dinosaur Bones
- July Talk

Side stage:

- Capital Cities
- Twin Forks
- Great Bloomers
- Hey Marseilles
- You Won't
- Imaginary Cities
- Lucius
- The Treble
- The Treasures

=== 2014 ===
Location: TD Echo Beach, Toronto.

Dates: July 1 (Edgefest 1), July 18 (Edgefest 2), August 16 (Edgefest 3).

Edgefest 1:

- The Sheepdogs
- Monster Truck
- Matt Mays
- Head of the Herd

Emerging Artist stage:

- The Zolas
- Royal Canoe
- Teenage Kicks

Edgefest 2:

- Ubiquitous Synergy Seeker
- MS MR
- Said the Whale
- Bear Hands

Emerging Artist stage:

- Wildlife
- Dear Rouge

Edgefest 3:

- Our Lady Peace
- Sloan
- I Mother Earth
- Eve 6

=== 2015 ===
Location: TD Echo Beach, Toronto.

Dates: July 23 (Edgefest 1), July 29 (Edgefest 2), August 15 (Edgefest 3).

Edgefest 1:

- Milky Chance
- Elle King
- X Ambassadors

Emerging Artist stage:

- The Zolas
- The Franklin Electric
- JJ and the Pillars

Edgefest 2:

- Incubus
- Deftones
- The Bots

Emerging Artist stage:

- Brothers of North
- XPrime

Edgefest 3:

- Mother Mother
- Kongos
- Scott Helman

Emerging Artist stage:

- Coleman Hell
- K.I.D
- Bestie
- Gray
