= Bloody Chicletts =

Canadian pop/rock band

- Origin: Vancouver, Canada
- Genres: Alternative rock; power pop; new wave
- Years active: 1995–1997
- Labels: BMG, Ariola
- Members: Glen Reid; Devin Reschny; Gabe Tracey; Chad Reid; Kurt Dahle; Glenn Kruger

Bloody Chicletts was a Canadian new wave, power pop band based in Vancouver. Band members were guitarist/vocalist Glen Reid, keyboardist Devin Reschny, bassist Chad Reid, and drummer Gabe Tracey. They were signed to BMG Music Canada and released one album, 1996's Presenting...Bloody Chicletts.

== History ==
Reid and Reschny are from Calgary and moved to Vancouver's Kitsilano neighbourhood to escape the cold Calgary climate and to find additional musicians. Reid recruited his cousin Chad, and the band connected with drummer Kurt Dahle. Dahle later left to focus on his other active projects, Age of Electric and Limblifter, and was replaced by drummer/vocalist Glenn Kruger (Carly Rae Jepsen, Mudgirl, the Paperboys, the Real McKenzies) and later Gabe Tracy.

Taking influence from the Police, the Cars, and Blondie, the group developed a power pop repertoire and signed with BMG Canada in 1996. Soon after, they released the album Presenting...Bloody Chicletts. It was mixed by Garth "GGGarth" Richardson and charted on the Canadian Campus Radio Chart, debuting at No. 30. The album spent eight weeks on the chart and reached No. 21 in February 1997. Presenting...Bloody Chicletts was produced by drummer Kurt Dahle. Record sales were moderate.

"She's a Freak", the lead single from Presenting...Bloody Chicletts, was promoted through a video directed by Matt Mahurin. It debuted at No. 29 on the RPM Alternative 30 charts on November 11, 1996, and stayed on the chart for eight weeks, eventually reaching No. 13 in January 1997.

The band opened for Matthew Sweet, The Killjoys, and Odds in 1996 and 1997.

In his 2008 book, Shake Some Action: The Ultimate Power Pop Guide, John M. Borack ranked Presenting...Bloody Chicletts at No. 184 in his list of the 200 best power pop albums of all time.

== Discography ==
- Presenting...Bloody Chicletts (1996)
