= Zuckerbaby =

Canadian musical group

- Origin: Calgary, Alberta, Canada
- Genres: Alternative rock, power pop
- Years active: pre-1996–present
- Labels: None, formerly Mercury/Polygram and Mercury/Universal
- Members: Andy Eichhorn – Lead vocals, guitar Reed Shimozawa – Guitar, vocals Ed Tiegs – Bass, drums Ian Grant – Drums
- Website: MySpace page

Zuckerbaby is an Alberta-based rock band that had some success in Canada during the late 1990s. The band formed out of local Calgary groove band Calliope. The band was known for its power pop influences and the thick lead guitar sounds of Reed Shimozawa, an alumnus of Calgary-based hair metal band Smash L.A. "Andromeda", "Heavy", and "Shampoo" were singles released from their debut, self-titled album. Their second CD, Platinum Again, was released in 2000 and two singles were released from it; "Overexposure" and "Holiday". The band was dropped from its label when Mercury Records was reorganized under Universal Music.

On 28 August 2015, the band reunited with the appearance of original members, Andy Eichorn and Reed Shimozawa, who were joined by two local Calgary musicians for a one-time live opening show at the Marquee Beer Market and Stage with headlining band Age of Electric.

== Band members ==
- Andy Eichhorn – Lead vocals, guitar
- Reed Shimozawa – Guitar, vocals
- Ed Tiegs – Bass, drums (replaced Ted Koti in 1999)
- Ian Grant – Drums

=== Former members ===
- Brian Doss – Bass
- Ted Koti – Bass (replaced Doss in 1998, and was replaced by Ed Tiegs in 1999)
- Wayne Stadler – Drums
- Mark Freeland – Bass
- Kurt Dahle – Drums (temporary for Stadler in 1998)

The band also had co-writers for their Platinum Again album:

- Kevin McKenzie (from Damn The Diva)
- Reggie Bibby
- Todd Kerns (ex-Age of Electric and Static in Stereo member)
- Ryan Dahle (Limblifter, ex-Age of Electric member)
- Dave Genn (Guitarist and keyboardist for the Matthew Good Band)

== Origin of the name ==
The name "Zuckerbaby" comes from a German art film, made in 1985, directed and written by Percy Adlon. The film is also known as Sugarbaby.

== Discography ==
Year	Title	Label
1996	Ooh I'm So Pretty	Calgary Band Compilation (featuring Andromeda and Jealousy)
1997	Zuckerbaby	Mercury/Polygram
2000	Platinum Again	Mercury/Universal

=== Singles ===
Year	Song	Album
1997	"Andromeda"	Zuckerbaby
1997	"Heavy"	Zuckerbaby
1998	"Shampoo"	Zuckerbaby
2000	"Overexposure"	Platinum Again
2000	"Holiday"	Platinum Again
