= Sin City Sinners =

American rock band

- Origin: Las Vegas, Nevada, U.S.
- Genres: Hard rock
- Years active: 2007–present
- Members: Jizzy Pearl; Rowan Robertson; Scott Griffin; Scot Coogan
- Past members: Joshua Alan; Michael 'Doc' Ellis; D Mike Szuter; Troy Powell; Zachary Throne; Brent Muscat; Todd Kerns; Rob Cournoyer; Blas Elias

Sin City Sinners is an American rock band who perform self-penned originals and rock and roll covers at key venues throughout Las Vegas, Nevada. The band is composed of a group of core members: Brent Muscat (ex-Faster Pussycat) on guitar; Todd Kerns (Age of Electric, Static in Stereo, Slash) on lead vocals and guitar; and Rob Cournoyer (Raging Slab) on drums. In addition, Sin City Sinners' performances regularly feature appearances by many notable musicians, comedians, actors, and other entertainers. The group started around 2007, and was spun off from an earlier "Sin City All-Stars" band that featured Brent Muscat and Louie Merlino, amongst others.

== History ==
In 2009, The Sin City Sinners decided to finally put some of their originals and favorites into their debut CD. The CD "Exile on Fremont Street" was produced by frontman Todd Kerns and released in early 2010. The album was met with rave reviews. The hard work of the Sin City Sinners also garnished them the title of "Best In Vegas – Editor's Pick" by the Las Vegas Review-Journal.

In mid-2010, Todd Kerns was offered to go on tour with Slash. Todd joined Slash on his solo album promotion tours and continues to front the Sin City Sinners when in Las Vegas. While Todd was on tour, the Sinners continued on with help from Louie Merlino (Beggars & Thieves), Jimmy Crespo (Aerosmith) and Scott Griffin (LA Guns).

On December 17, 2010, The Sin City Sinners released the all-acoustic album titled Broken Record. On November 25, 2011, the band released the holiday CD A Sinners Christmas, produced by Brent Muscat & Tom Parham and executive produced by Jason Green. A Sinners Christmas included guest appearances by George Lynch, Ron Keel, Slim Jim Phantom (The Stray Cats), Jizzy Pearl (RATT, Love/Hate), Pete Loran (Trixter), Louie Merlino (Beggars & Thieves), Frank Dimino (Angel) and Sammy Serious (The Zeros).

In early 2012, long-time bassist Michael "Doc" Ellis left the band, and was replaced by Zach Throne (CMFT, Corey Taylor) solo project. In 2013, Michael Ellis returned to play bass and sing, with Zach Throne taking the front man spot while Todd Kerns was on tour with Slash.

In July 2014, Zach Throne left the band and with Todd Kerns out on tour again with Slash, they recruited Joshua Alan to take the frontman position. In September 2014, Scott Griffin (formerly of L.A. Guns) was added to the group as bass player.

On February 19, 2016, Joshua announced his departure from the Sin City Sinners in order to work full-time with Ratt.

== Awards and honors ==
Two years in a row (2009 and 2010) the Sin City Sinners won 'Best of Vegas' in the Las Vegas Review Journal reader's poll,

In 2010, their music video "Going to Vegas" received the 32nd annual Telly Award.

In 2014, the band won the Best of Las Vegas award for best local band, as voted by people across the Vegas Valley. Likewise, that same year, Las Vegas mayor Carolyn G. Goodman proclaimed August 27, 2014 (the band's 7th anniversary) to be Sin City Sinners day, in response to the band's charitable efforts over the years which have generated nearly a million dollars to go towards numerous worthy causes.

In 2015, the band won Las Vegas Weekly's "Best of Vegas" Readers Choice Award.

== Venues ==
Previous venues played by the band have included the Divebar, Santa Fe Station, Boulder Station, and Sunset Station. Other common venues include the Rio Hotel and Casino, Favorites Bar and Grill (now the Dive Bar), the Zebra Lounge, and the Fremont Street Experience. The band has also played at Girls Girls Girls, a new strip club owned by Mötley Crüe's Vince Neil. Other venues have included the Hard Rock Hotel and Casino and Count's Vamp'd, owned by Danny "The Count" Koker, from the History Channel's Counting Cars.

In earlier shows, the band would typically walk onto stage with the recorded version of The Good, the Bad and the Ugly (theme) by Ennio Morricone playing over the speakers.

== Discography ==
- Exile on Fremont St. (2010): The band's first full-length album. Features a mixture of new songs, songs Todd Kerns did originally as a solo artist/Static In Stereo, and one other cover song ("Ah! Leah!", originally by Donnie Iris.) This album was later reissued with bonus tracks under the band name "Original Sin."
- Broken Record (2010): An acoustic EP of 6 songs. 4 songs are acoustic versions of ones from Exile, 2 are newly recorded for this disc.
- A Sinner's Christmas (2011): The band's collection of covers of holiday classics. Includes many special guests, and a spoken word intro from porn legend Ron Jeremy. Features guest stars, including Jizzy Pearl and Ron Keel.
- Divebar Days Revisited (2013): A collection of assorted cover songs the band played during their earlier years together. Guests include Chris Holmes and Phil Lewis.
- A Sinner's Christmas 2 (2013): The second Christmas CD from the band. Guests include Tiffany and Oz Fox.
- Let It Burn (2016): A full-length CD with original songs written by previous band members, and the current band members at that time.
