= The Manvils =

Canadian rock band

- Origin: Vancouver, British Columbia, Canada
- Genres: Indie rock
- Years active: 2005–present
- Labels: Sandbag Records
- Members: Mikey Manville; Jay Koenderman; Dave Fenton
- Past members: Greg Buhr; Andy Mac; Mark Parry; Jason Skiendziel
- Website: themanvils.com

The Manvils are a Canadian rock band from Vancouver. The band consists of the singer, songwriter and guitarist Mikey Manville, bass guitarist Dave Fenton and drummer Jay Koenderman.

The Manvils have appeared on stage with Stereophonics, Suicide Girls, The Bellrays, The Horror Pops. Metric, De La Soul, Jarvis Cocker, Bif Naked, Sonic Youth, Ben Harper and The Relentless7, Daniel Wesley and Dragonette.

The band signed a recording contract with the Vancouver indie label Sandbag Records in early 2008.

In 2008, The Manvils began writing and recording an album with the producer, Ryan Dahle (Limblifter/Age of Electric). Recorded at The Factory and The RecRoom (Greenhouse Studios), the new album was finished in early 2009. The Manvils was released in Canada on August 11, 2009, through Fontana North Distribution.

The Manvils relocated to Toronto, Ontario in the fall of 2011 and Jason Skiendziel was brought on board to replace Greg Buhr on bass guitar. Dave Fenton replaced Jason Skiendziel on bass in May 2018 at the Mod Club Theatre in Toronto.

== Media ==
- The band appeared on the front page of the popular Canadian arts magazine ION in the April 2006 edition.
- Their music has been used in films and television including the award-winning CBC Television documentary series Moscow Freestyle and a 2007 Budweiser beer commercial.
- The soundtrack to the 2008 horror movie Never Cry Werewolf includes eight tracks from Buried Love and two tracks from Manville's 2007 solo album Broken Arms.

== Current band members ==
- Mikey Manville (vocals/guitars)
- Dave Fenton (bass guitar/vocals)
- Jay Koenderman (drums/vocals)

== Discography ==
=== Albums ===
Info	Track listing
Buried Love; Year: 2007; Format: CD; Label: Sandbag Records/Manvils Music	1. "Missing You"; 2. "Pretty Bleed"; 3. "Bible Billy"; 4. "Between The Lashes"; 5. "Undertow"; 6. "Unoriginal"; 7. "Over These Hills"; 8. "Can You Feel Me"; 9. "Buried Love"; 10. "Crowded Room"
Strange Disaster (EP); Year: 2007; Format: CD; Label: Sandbag Records/Manvils Music	1. "Strange Disaster"; 2. "Hang On Man " 3. "Helter Skelter" (Lennon–McCartney)
The Manvils; Year: 2009; Format: CD, vinyl Label: Sandbag Records	1. "Good Luck Club"; 2. "Turpentine"; 3. "Strange Disaster"; 4. "Substation"; 5. "Riverside"; 6. "The Stoker"; 7. "Guillotine"; 8. "True Believers"; 9. "Hollow Hands"; 10. "A Few Dollars More"; 11. "Passport"
Black Tornado (EP); Year: 2011; Format: CD, vinyl Label: Sandbag Records	1. "Lions of a Lost Tongue"; 2. "Black Tornado"; 3. "Alone With You"; 4. "Castaway"; 5. "Hot Volcano Like"
Expats (EP); Year: 2014; Format: CD, vinyl Label: Sandbag Records	1. "Tambourine Era"; 2. "Expats"; 3. "Emperors"; 4. "Costume Jewellery"; 5. "Heart of the Hide"
