= The Choir Practice =

Canadian indie pop band

- Origin: Vancouver, British Columbia, Canada
- Genres: Indie pop
- Years active: 2005–present
- Labels: Mint

The Choir Practice is a Canadian indie pop band from Vancouver formed in 2005.

== History ==
The Choir Practice formed in Vancouver, British Columbia, Canada in the spring of 2005. A musical collective consisting of a rotating cast of "indie rock royalty" Coco Culbertson (The Gay), Larissa Loyva (P:ano), Ida Nilsen (Great Aunt Ida), Shane Turner (Love and Mathematics), Jenn Chycoski, Chris Kelly, Ska-T, Karin Bubas, Shira Blustein (Blood Meridian), Sidney Vermont (Hello, Blue Roses), Naomi Mepham, Marcy Emery, Kurt Dahle (Limblifter, The New Pornographers), Olivia Fetherstonhaugh and Kristen Halliday, the band performs pop songs in a choral style. The band was originally formed "as an excuse to drink wine and sing with friends", according to Turner.

The band released their self-titled debut album on Mint Records on 15 May 2007. They attracted significant media notice in April when Jarvis Cocker announced that he had selected the band to open his Vancouver concert 1 May 2007. The band received critical acclaim from Exclaim! for their debut. They have been featured on CBC Radio.

== Discography ==
- The Choir Practice (2007)

== See also ==
- List of bands from Canada
