= Kurt Dahle =

Canadian musician

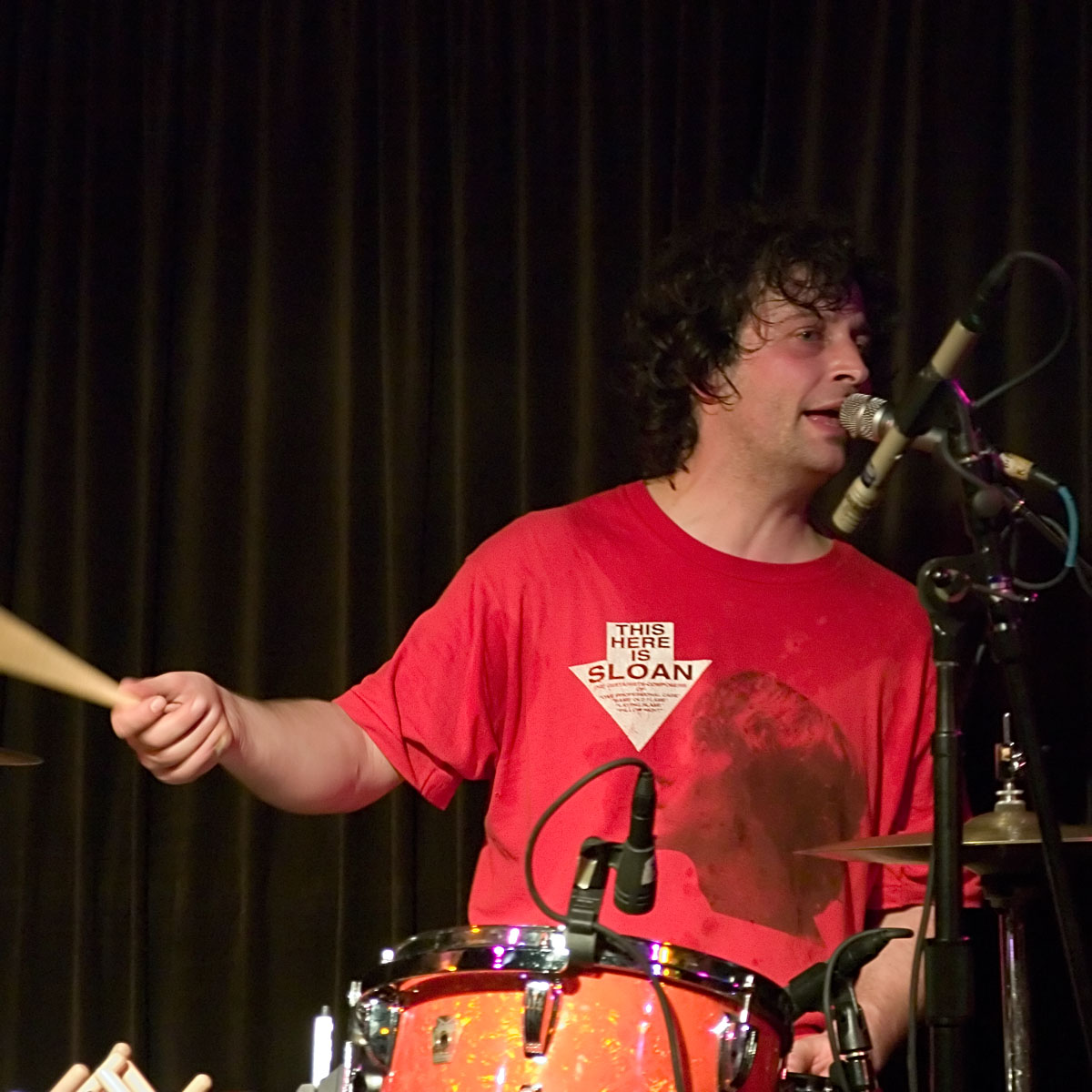
- Dahle playing with the New Pornographers, March 20, 2006

Background information
- Born: September 30, 1967 (age 58); Moose Jaw, Saskatchewan, Canada
- Genres: Rock, Indie rock
- Occupations: Musician, producer
- Instruments: Drums, percussion, Vocals, backing vocals
- Labels: Mercury, Matador, Mint Records

Kurt Colin Dahle is a Juno Award winning, Grammy nominated Canadian musician. Dahle is best known for his work as a drummer and vocalist with the rock bands Age of Electric, Limblifter, and The New Pornographers. He is a multi-instrumentalist who plays drums, keyboard, organ, guitar, saxophone and bass.

== Early life ==
Born in Moose Jaw, Saskatchewan, Dahle began playing drums when he was 15 years old. He and younger brother Ryan, were a musical force early on and played in the bands The Age of Electric and Limblifter together.

== 1986–1998: The Age of Electric ==
The Age of Electric was conceived by Todd Kerns and Dahle circa 1986 and was born in April of 1989 after their two younger brothers, John Kerns and Ryan Dahle, graduated from high school. To practice, the Dahle brothers traveled two hours north from their home in Regina, Saskatchewan Canada to the Kerns brothers small home town of Lanigan, Saskatchewan.

The band's commercial breakthrough came with their independent EP Ugly in 1993, which set the stage for the major label release of their self-titled album in 1995.

The band then released Make a Pest a Pet in 1997. The album produced the radio hit "Remote Control", which peaked at No. 9 on the singles chart in Canada and was later put on MuchMusic's diamond certified compilation album, Big Shiny Tunes 2. Although it was the band's most successful album yet, being certified gold in Canada in 1998, tensions within the band led the group to break up after a 1998 tour as the opening band for Our Lady Peace. That year the band was nominated for a Juno Award as best new group.

On January 14, 1998, the band played their last show in 1998 at Copps Coliseum in Hamilton, Ontario.

== 1996–2000: Limblifter ==
In 1996, while the Dahle brothers were still a part of The Age of Electric, they founded a side project band with Ian Somers called Limblifter. This band showcased a more melodic, power pop approach than the heavier music the brothers played with Age of Electric. Their self-titled 1996 album, recorded after a mere 10 practices, spawned the Canadian rock radio hits "Tinfoil", "Vicious" and "Screwed It Up"

After the dissolution of Age of Electric in 1999, Limblifter released a second album, Bellaclava in 2000 producing hits like "Ariel vs. Lotus" and "Wake Up to the Sun".

In 1997, the band were nominated for Best Alternative Album and Best New Group at The Juno awards.

Kurt left Limblifter in 2001, but his brother Ryan continued on with a new lineup.

== 2000–2014: The New Pornographers ==
In 2000 Dahle joined The New Pornographers, who gained much critical acclaim for their albums Mass Romantic (2000), Electric Version (2003), Twin Cinema (2005), Challengers (2007), and Together (2010).

The band won the Juno award for Best Alternative Album in 2001 for Mass Romantic, and were nominated for Alternative Album Of The Year in 2006 for Twin Cinema.

In September 2014, Dahle left the New Pornographers.

== 2017: The Age of Electric reunites ==
In 2017, to celebrate 20th anniversary of the album Make A Pest A Pet, The Age of Electric reunited for a two week tour across Canada including Calgary, Thunder Bay and Vancouver with Dahle back on drums.

== Other musical endeavors ==
Dahle has toured with New Pornographers bandmate Neko Case and played on her Grammy award nominated solo album, The Worse Things Get, the Harder I Fight, the Harder I Fight, the More I Love You.

Other acts Dahle has also recorded and/or performed live with include; his brother Ryan Dahle's solo album, Stevie Jackson (Belle and Sebastian), Destroyer, Chris Walla (Death Cab for Cutie), Kathryn Calder, the Evaporators, the Awkward Stage, Bloody Chicletts, Zuckerbaby, My Oldest Friend, the Choir Practice, Nathan, Mother Mother, The Floydian Device, the Tennessee Twin, Mark Kleiner Power Trio, Fancey and Flash Bastard.

As a record producer he has worked with Bloody Chicletts, the Gay, Pokiok Falls, Chris Kelly, and the Organ. Kurt also worked on the self-titled album by the Choir Practice, and Heaven Is for Easy Girls by the Awkward Stage, both released with Mint Records.

Growing up in Saskatchewan, Dahle listened to The Poppy Family on the radio and lists them as a major influence to his musical taste. In 1999, Dahle sent an email to the Juno Award committee threatening to kill himself if The Poppy Family wasn’t inducted into the Canadian Music Hall of Fame; “I never got a reply. I guess they didn’t care if I killed myself. But that’s how big a fan I am.” he said. In 2014, Dahle joined The Poppy Family, to perform together at the Khatsahlano festival.

In 2018, Dahle played saxophone, keyboards and performed background vocals for Slow on their reunion tour.

Paiste cymbals are Dahle's choice and has stated he loves their shimmery sound. Bun E Carlos from Cheap Trick, Clem Burke, Bobby Graham and Dinky Diamond are some of Dahle's favourite drummers.

== Personal life ==
Dahle lives in Vancouver and has two sons with Coco Culbertson of The Choir Practice.

Dahle has an interest in photography, in particular Fuji cameras.
