= Rah Rah (band) =

Former indie rock band from Canada

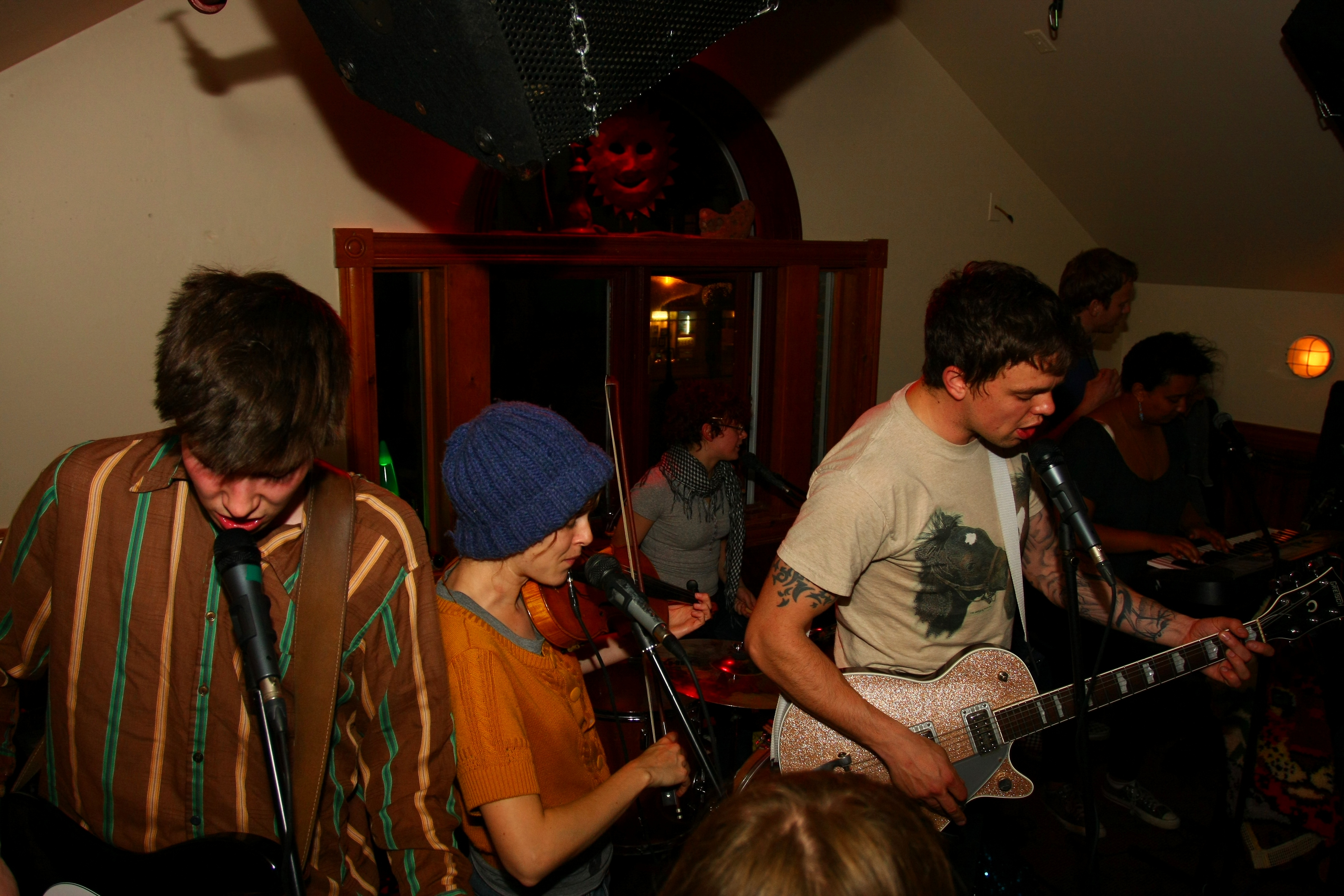
- Rah Rah performing in 2009

Background information
- Origin: Regina, Saskatchewan, Canada
- Genre: Indie rock
- Years active: 2006–2019
- Labels: Hidden Pony Records; Young Soul Records
- Members: Marshall Burns; Kristina Hedlund; Erin Passmore; Joel Passmore; Jeffrey Romanyk
- Past members: Leif Thorseth; Vanessa Benson; Dan Crozier; Samra Sahlu; Kyrie Kristmanson

Rah Rah was an indie rock musical group formed in 2006 in Regina, Saskatchewan, Canada. They toured extensively across North America and Europe. The band released four full-length albums, including 2015's Vessels. After a three-year hiatus, the band played three final live shows in December of 2019 and disbanded.

== History ==
The group formed as a three-piece in 2006 made up of Erin Passmore (drums/vocals), Kyrie Kristmanson (trumpet/guitar/vocals) and Marshall Burns (guitar/vocals). In 2006, they released the Songs for Pasquala EP independently. That same year the band performed at the Regina Folk Festival as well as Pop Montreal.

By 2007, Joel Passmore (formerly of Despistado and Sylvie) had joined the band on bass along with Samra Sahlu on keyboards and Kristina Hedlund on violin. The five-piece recorded their debut full length Going Steady which was released in November 2008 on Young Soul Records. Shortly thereafter Leif Thorseth, also formerly of Despistado, joined the band on guitar.

In 2009, the band toured Canada extensively in support of the album. The group also began work on their next record with producer Kees Dekker (Plants and Animals) in Montreal. This second full-length album, Breaking Hearts, was eventually nominated for a Western Canadian Music Award, for Rock Recording of the Year.

In late May 2009, Rah Rah's song "Duet for Emmylou and the Grievous Angel" was available for free download on iTunes for a week. Also, the song "Tentacles" was available in Starbucks stores as the free download card of the week.

The band underwent another line-up change in the fall of 2009 when Vanessa Benson (keyboards/vocals/bass) joined the group. Rah Rah was named "Best Alternative New Artist" and "Best New Canadiana Artist" on iTunes Canada's Best of 2009 list. Rah Rah headlined the Whistler Live! stage during the 2010 Paralympic Games and also performed at the Saskatchewan Pavilion.

In 2012, the group signed with Montreal's Hidden Pony Records. That year the band released their third LP, The Poet's Dead, which marked the debut of Jeffrey Romanyk on drums. The album was produced by Gus Van Go and Werner F. at the Boiler Room Studio. In 2013, the album was longlisted for the 2013 Polaris Music Prize as well as nominated for a Juno Award for Best Alternative Album. It also won the WCMA for Independent Album of the Year.

Also in 2013, the band, now a five-piece, signed with German label Devil Duck Records and subsequently toured Europe.

In 2015, the band released their fourth LP, Vessels, again produced by the production team of Gus Van Go and Werner F.

In 2016, the band toured Japan with The Elwins.

In 2019, after a three-year hiatus from recording and touring, the group announced they were disbanding and the members were all moving on to other projects. The band released one final song, "Art Holds No Truth" from the 2015 Vessels sessions, and played three final shows in their home province before the New Year, in Saskatoon and Regina.

The band had toured with such notable acts as Wintersleep, The Besnard Lakes, Land of Talk, Yukon Blonde, Dear Rouge, Plants and Animals, Said the Whale, Two Hours Traffic, Minus the Bear, and The Elwins.

They had also performed at a number of festivals such as CMJ in New York City, NXNE and CMW in Toronto, SXSW in Austin, Texas, Reperbahn Festival in Hamburg, Germany, Great Escape in Brighton, England, Halifax Pop Explosion, Pop Montreal, Supercrawl in Hamilton, Ontario, BreakoutWest, JunoFest and Sled Island in Calgary, Alberta.

The group was noted for their energetic live shows which often featured some combination of giant balloons, piñatas, robot cats, Pop Rocks candy, and confetti.

== Members ==
- Marshall Burns – guitar, vocals
- Kristina Hedlund – violin, vocals, keyboard
- Erin Passmore – vocals, keyboard, guitar, drums
- Joel Passmore – bass, vocals
- Jeffrey Romanyk – drums, guitar
- Leif Thorseth – guitar

== Discography ==
=== Albums ===
- Going Steady (November 18, 2008)
- Breaking Hearts (June 1, 2010)
- The Poet's Dead (October 2, 2012)
- Vessels (September 11, 2015)

=== EPs ===
- Songs for Pasquala (2006)
- The Sailors (March 22, 2011)

=== Remix albums ===
- Rahmixes (2011)

=== Singles ===
Year	Song	Chart peak	Album
Year	Song	CAN Alt	Album
2012	"Art and a Wife"	43	The Poet's Dead
2013	"Prairie Girl"	27	The Poet's Dead
"—" denotes a release that did not chart.
