= Joshua Alan =

American singer

Josh Alan
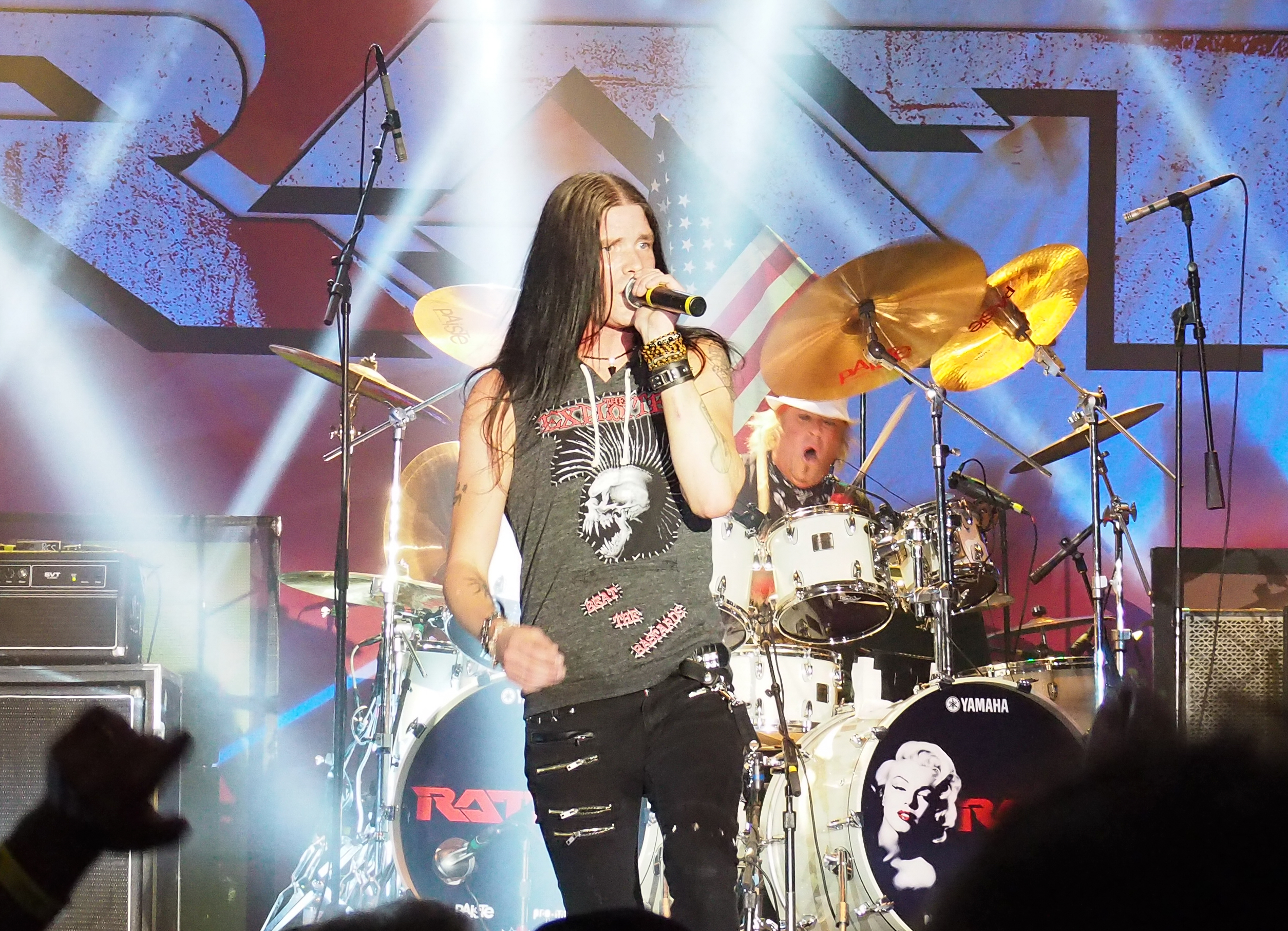
- Josh Alan live with Bobby Blotzer's version of RATT September 4, 2016, in Akron, Ohio

Background information
- Born: Joshua Alan
- Genres: Heavy metal; hard rock
- Occupation: Singer
- Instrument: Vocals
- Member of: RATT
- Formerly of: Sin City Sinners

Joshua Alan is an American musician, and was the singer for Bobby Blotzer's version of RATT during the American Made 2016 tour.

== Music career ==
In 2010, Josh moved to Las Vegas, Nevada, to expand his musical career. After filtering through several local bands, He joined up with the Sin City Sinners, leading the vocals for the band that included members Brent Muscat (Faster Pussycat), Scott Griffin (RATT and L.A. Guns), Michael "Doc" Ellis (RATT, Love/Hate, and Todd Kerns and the Anti-Stars), and Blas Elias (Slaughter). In March 2015, RATT drummer Bobby Blotzer guested with the Sinners. Blotzer asked Josh and fellow Sinners' members Doc and Scott to join him in forming a new version of RATT. Josh toured with Blotzer's version of RATT while continuing as the singer for the Sin City Sinners. February 14, 2016, the Sinners released the album Let It Burn. On February 19, 2016, Josh announced his departure from the Sin City Sinners in order to work full-time with Blotzer's version of RATT. During this time, he toured world-wide with Blotzer's version of RATT as lead vocalist for the American Made tour, performing throughout the United States, in Canada, and the U.K.

On January 23, 2017, Josh resigned from RATT to pursue his own musical career.

== Charity Work ==
Josh has participated in several charity events including Great Strides Cystic Fibrosis Foundation, Susan G Komen Race for the Cure, Scale the Strat, Nevada Society for the Prevention of Cruelty to Animals, and Toys for Tots.

== Awards ==
In 2014, the Sin City Sinners, in which Josh was lead vocals, won the Best of Las Vegas award for best local band. In 2015, they won Las Vegas Weekly's "Best of Vegas" Readers' Choice Award.
