= Barstool Prophets =

Canadian rock band

- Also known as: Wallflowers
- Origin: Cornwall, Ontario
- Genres: Rock
- Years active: 1989–1999
- Labels: Mercury Records
- Past members: Glenn Forrester; Graham Greer; Al Morier; Bobby Tamas
- Website: www.barstoolprophets.com

The Barstool Prophets were a rock band formed in Cornwall, Ontario, in 1989 and active throughout the 1990s. The members were bassist Glenn Forrester, singer/songwriter Graham Greer, guitarist Al Morier, and drummer Bobby Tamas. In 1995, The Georgia Straight called them "one of the best guitar-rock bands to emerge in Canada since The Tragically Hip."

== History ==
Originally known as the 'Wallflowers', the band changed its name due to avoid confusion with the American band of the same name. They moved to Ottawa to attend university and, in 1992, independently released their first album, Deflowered. They landed tours with Odds, 54-40, Moist, and The Age of Electric, then opened for Dave Matthews Band. Along the way, they sold 8,000 copies of the album and built a solid fan base.

In 1994, the band was signed to Mercury Records and released Crank in 1995. This album initially produced two hit singles: "Mankindman" and "Paranoia", which charted in the top-10 in Canada. The videos for both songs got heavy rotation on MuchMusic and "Paranoia" was used in the soundtrack for the 1995 film Never Talk to Strangers. They played the MuchMusic stage several times, toured with Junkhouse and Headstones, and landed a US distribution deal. A third single, "Little Death (Oh Mary Mary)" charted and sales hit 50,000, certifying the album gold.

Barstool Prophets released the third album, Last of the Big Game Hunters, in 1997. From this album, "Last of the Big Game Hunters", "Upside Down" and "Friend of Mine" all charted in the top-20. They spent the next two years touring, with I Mother Earth, The Tea Party, Our Lady Peace and Big Sugar.

Between non-stop touring and the turmoil of record label mergers and losses, the band members had had enough and broke up in 1999. Greer went on to produce two solo albums: Moonlight Graham and Graham Greer. Morier released three solo albums: Ensemble, Distance and Images.

In 2015, Barstool Prophets reunited to play a concert in Ottawa in celebration of the 20th anniversary of the release of their first album. They played another concert in 2016 and four in 2017. Their most recent show was in 2018.

== Discography ==
Albums

- Birdman (1992, as 'Wallflowers'), Independent
- Deflowered (1993), Independent
- Crank (1995), Mercury Records (#63 Canada)
- Last of the Big Game Hunters (1997), Mercury Records
- Greatest Hits (2015), Stool Sample Music

=== Singles ===
Year	Single	Peak chart positions	Album
Year	Single	CAN	Album
1995	"Mankind Man" / "Tell Me It's A Dream"	34	Crank
1995	"Paranoia"	59	Crank
1997	"Last of the Big Game Hunters"	48	Last of the Big Game Hunters
1998	"Friend of Mine"	30	Last of the Big Game Hunters
"—" denotes releases that did not chart. "×" denotes periods where charts did not exist or were not archived.
