= The Awkward Stage =

Canadian pop band

- Origin: Vancouver, British Columbia, Canada
- Genres: Indie pop
- Years active: 2006-2009
- Label: Mint Records
- Members: Shane Nelken; Tygh Runyan; Tony Koelwyn; Chris Mitchell
- Website: theawkwardstage.ca (defunct)

The Awkward Stage was a Canadian indie pop band from Vancouver fronted by singer-songwriter Shane Nelken. The band's supporting lineup consisted of Tygh Runyan on lead guitar, Tony Koelwyn on drums and Chris Mitchell on trumpet and keyboards.

== History ==
Nelken, who works as a cremationist, had a longtime side career as a musician, supporting a number of artists including A. C. Newman, New Pornographers and Sparrow. He put together The Awkward Stage (which included drummer Kurt Dahle), and released a debut album, Heaven Is for Easy Girls, on Mint Records in 2006. Nelken performed much of the music himself, with some help from violinist Kim Koch and trumpeter Shaun Brodie. The album charted on Canadian campus radio and CBC Radio 3, which named the band's song "We're Going for a Ride" one of its Top 94 songs of 2006.

With Tygh Runyan, Tony Koelwyn and Chris Mitchell, The Awkward Stage released a second album, Slimming Mirrors, Flattering Lights, in 2008. The songs were written and arranged by Nelkin.

The band has been inactive since 2009.

== Discography ==
- Heaven Is for Easy Girls (2006), Mint Records
- Slimming Mirrors, Flattering Lights (2008), Mint Records
