= The Choir Practice (album) =

Studio album by The Choir Practice
- Released: 2007
- Genre: Indie folk
- Length: 34:33
- Label: Mint
- Producer: Kurt Dahle

The Choir Practice is the self-titled debut album by Canadian indie pop collective The Choir Practice, released in 2007 on Mint Records.

The album includes a version of Carl Newman's "Failsafe", which was recorded and released several months before Newman released his own recording of the song on The New Pornographers' album Challengers.

== Reception ==
The album received generally favorable reviews, with Exclaim!'s Chris Whibbs describing it "Sometimes it plods a bit...but at other times it's pretty awesome", while saying that the album is "full of lovely moments but the gimmick remains a gimmick." Margaret Reges, writing for Allmusic, compared the album to folk acts such as The New Christy Minstrels, Peter, Paul & Mary, Fairport Convention, and The Mamas & the Papas, calling it "nostalgic, wise, inspiring stuff" and stating "The Choir Practice are at their best when they take the traditional chorale sound and gently twist it into indie rock shapes with the help of a lone electric guitar and some handclaps". Cassandra Kyle of The StarPhoenix, described the album as "completely enjoyable and fun", describing the band's sound as "a 1960s easy listening vibe with a modern twist". The Georgia Straight described it as "a sort of a '60s utopia of beautiful and talented women, tambourines, and men in crisp white pants", identifying The New Seekers, Godspell, and The Langley Schools Music Project as possible influences.

== Track listing ==
The Choir Practice
No.	Title	Length
1.	"Running On"	3:14
2.	"Red Fox"	2:08
3.	"I See Things"	3:01
4.	"Pretty"	3:22
5.	"White Hat"	2:29
6.	"Believe in Something"	2:56
7.	"Failsafe"	1:54
8.	"Little Hands"	3:54
9.	"Loose Lips"	3:02
10.	"Up All Day"	4:18
Total length:		34:33
