= Make a Pest a Pet =

Studio album by The Age of Electric
- Released: February 25, 1997
- Recorded: at Mushroom Studios, Vancouver, B.C. (February 10–29, 1996); Greenhouse Studios, Vancouver (June 4–7, October 11–17, 1996)
- Genre: Alternative rock
- Length: 51:29
- Label: Mercury Records
- Producer: The Age of Electric, Gil Norton (tracks 2 & 7)

The Age of Electric chronology
The Age of Electric (1995)	Make a Pest a Pet (1997)	The Pretty EP (2017)

Singles from Make a Pest a Pet
- 1. "Remote Control"; 2. "I Don't Mind"; 3. "Don't Wreck It"

Make a Pest a Pet is the third and final studio album by Canadian alternative rock band The Age of Electric. The lead single, "Remote Control", was a Top 10 hit in Canada. It is the band's only album to make the Canadian Albums Chart, peaking at #78 in 1997. It was certified Gold in Canada in 1998.

== Reissue ==
In 2016, the band announced plans to release a remastered, expanded two-LP vinyl reissue of the album in 2017 in celebration of the album's 20th anniversary. The reissue was released on February 17, 2017. The reissue included four never before released songs from the Make a Pest a Pet sessions ("Th13teen", "Pass It On", "Blend In", and "Radio One").

== Track listing ==
No.	Title	Length
1.	"Remote Control"	3:39
2.	"I Don't Mind"	3:23
3.	"Nothing Happens"	3:32
4.	"Unity or Grenadine"	3:30
5.	"You Complain"	4:03
6.	"Scare Myself"	4:30
7.	"Blow Up"	3:25
8.	"Don't Wreck It"	5:33
9.	"Cranky"	3:17
10.	"Real Stumper"	4:01
11.	"Mad at the World"	3:23
12.	"My Mistake"	4:11
13.	"Exist To Resist"	4:52

2017 Reissue bonus tracks
No.	Title	Length
14.	"Th13teen"	4:02
15.	"Pass It On"	3:16
16.	"Blend In"	4:01
17.	"Radio One"	3:35

== Personnel ==
- Todd Kerns – vocals, guitars
- John Kerns – bass
- Ryan Dahle – guitars, vocals
- Kurt Dahle – drums, vocals
- Chris Bryant – mellotron
