= Slimming Mirrors, Flattering Lights =

Studio album by The Awkward Stage
- Released: June 10, 2008
- Genre: Indie pop
- Label: Mint Records
- Producer: Howard Redekopp

The Awkward Stage chronology
Heaven Is for Easy Girls (2006)	Slimming Mirrors, Flattering Lights (2008)

Professional ratings
Review scores
Source	Rating
Allmusic	4/5 stars

Slimming Mirrors, Flattering Lights is the second album by Canadian indie pop band The Awkward Stage, released June 10, 2008 on Mint Records.

== Track listing ==
1. "The Sun Goes Down on Girlsville"
2. "Your Heart Serves Only You"
3. "Anime Eyes"
4. "(prettier...)"
5. "Skeletal Blonde"
6. "Hey Modern Schoolgirl"
7. "Only Good Days Caught on Camera"
8. "(than...)"
9. "True Love on Three with Feeling"
10. "We Dreamt of Houses"
11. "I Hurt the Ones that Love Me"
12. "(them...)"
13. "Youth Is a War"
14. "Miniskirt of Christmas Lights"
15. "(Dandelion)"

=== Production ===
- Howard Redekopp - Producer, Engineer, Mixer
