= Sylvie (band) =

Canadian rock band

- Origin: Regina, Saskatchewan, Canada
- Genres: Indie rock
- Years active: 1999–present
- Labels: Smallman, Does Everyone Stare
- Members: Joel Passmore; Riva Farell Racette; Chris Notenboom; Erin Passmore; Jeff Romanyk
- Past members: Les Schaeffer
- Website: sylviemusic.com

Sylvie is a Canadian indie rock music group from Regina, Saskatchewan. It features singer/guitarist Joel Passmore, formerly of the now-disbanded Despistado, alongside bass player Riva Farrell Racette, guitarist Chris Notenboom, keyboardist Erin Passmore, and drummer Jeff Romanyk. All band members also provide backing vocals.

== History ==
Together since 1999, Sylvie developed alongside the members' other bands, emerging finally as their main focus with the release of 2005's An Electric Trace. This full-length album was recorded with Juno award-winning producer Brandon Friesen at Studio 11 in Winnipeg. Sylvie has played with such notables as Wintersleep, Minus the Bear, Death From Above 1979, The Smugglers, Hot Hot Heat, and The Constantines.

In 2003, Sylvie was nominated at the Western Canadian Music Awards (WCMA). Their album I Wish I Was Driving (produced by David J Taylor), released through Does Everyone Stare Records, was nominated for Outstanding Independent album of the year. This category included other artists such as Corb Lund, The Be Good Tanyas, and Swollen Members. Sylvie also played at the MuchMusic/Exclaim! showcase, as well as the industry awards show.

Their second full-length album An Electric Trace was released October 25, 2005, through Smallman Records. That year they showcased at NXNE and toured across Canada with Wintersleep and Uncut.

In 2006, they toured with controller.controller, and again with Wintersleep and The Ladies and Gentlemen (Small Sins). In February, Sylvie headlined with support from Ghosts of Modern Man and From Fiction for six weeks on their way to Canadian Music Week where they showcased at The Horseshoe for the Chart Magazine Night.

In June 2006, Sylvie was honoured on stage with the CBC Galaxie Award at their NXNE showcase. The Galaxie Rising Stars Program of the CBC is an original program designed to champion up-and-coming Canadian artists. Launched in 1998, this program sets out to discover, encourage and promote new artists. Past recipients include Arcade Fire, The Ladies and Gentlemen (Small Sins), and Great Lake Swimmers.

Their highly anticipated third album Trees And Shade Are Our Only Fences, produced by J. Robbins of Jawbox fame, was released on October 21, 2008, on Smallman Records. In the fall of 2008, Sylvie toured for six weeks, which included several US shows supporting Minus the Bear.

== Band members ==
Current members

- Joel Passmore - vocals, Guitar
- Riva Farrell Racette - Bass, Backing vocals
- Chris Notenboom - Guitar, Backing vocals
- Erin Passmore - Keyboard, Backing vocals
- Jeff Romanyk - drums, Backing vocals

Former members

- Les Schaeffer - drums (1999–2004)

== Discography ==
- I Wish I Was Driving (2003)
- An Electric Trace (2005)
- Trees And Shade Are Our Only Fences (2008)

== See also ==
- List of bands from Canada
