= Todd Kerns =

Canadian musician

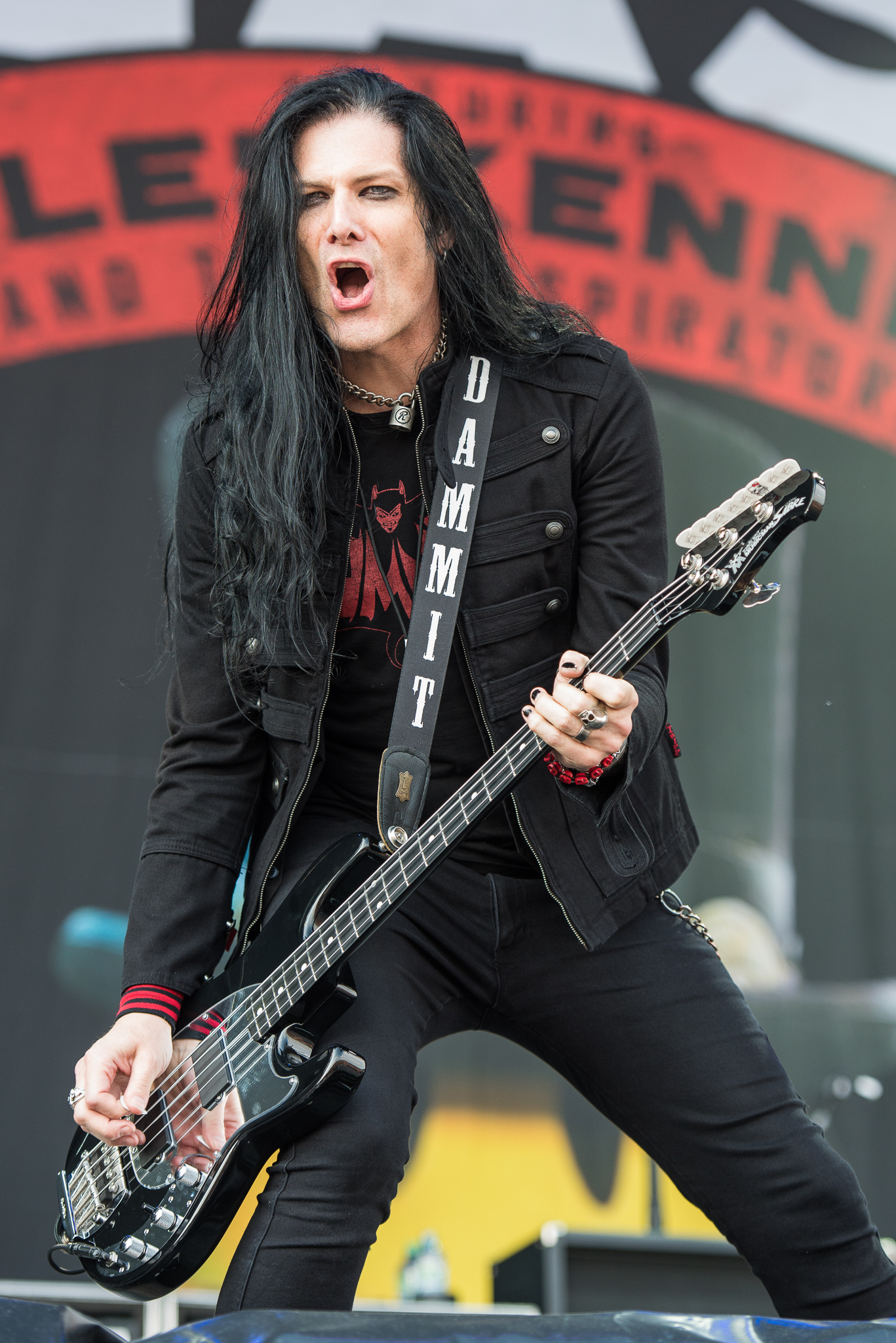
- Kerns performing with Slash in 2015

Background information
- Born: December 5, 1967 (age 58); Estevan, Saskatchewan Canada
- Genres: Hard rock; heavy metal; alternative metal
- Occupation: Musician
- Instruments: Bass guitar, vocals, guitar
- Years active: 1983–present
- Member of: Slash; Toque; Heroes and Monsters; Blackbird Angels
- Formerly of: The Age of Electric; Sin City Sinners; Static in Stereo; Adler's Appetite
- Website: toddkerns.com

Todd "Dammit" Kerns is a Canadian rock musician who has worked with several bands, most notably The Age of Electric. He is currently the bass guitarist and backing vocalist for Slash in the band Slash featuring Myles Kennedy and the Conspirators. He's also the lead vocalist for the band Blackbird Angels, which he co-founded with Tracii Guns.

== Career ==
=== 1989–2000: The Age of Electric etc. ===
Kerns fronted and played guitar in the hard rock band The Age of Electric, with his brother John Kerns on bass, Ryan Dahle on guitar, backing vocals, and Kurt Dahle on drums and backing vocals. The band's most successful release was 1997's Make a Pest a Pet. The album produced the radio rock hit "Remote Control", which peaked at No. 9 on the singles chart in Canada and resulted in the album being certified gold in Canada in 1998. The song "Remote Control" was later put on MuchMusic's diamond certified compilation album, Big Shiny Tunes 2.

In 1997, Kerns provided background vocals for Matthew Good Band's album Underdogs on the songs "Rico" and "Everything Is Automatic" In 1999, he again provided background vocals for the Matthew Good Band on their album Beautiful Midnight, on the songs "Hello Time Bomb", and "Born to Kill".

For 99.3 CFOX's Year of the Fox compilation at Bryan Adams' Warehouse Studio in 1999, Kerns, along with Bif Naked, Trevor Hurst, Matthew Good, Craig Northey, Neil Osborne, Ashwin Sood, Brain Minato, recorded a cover of Prince's "1999".

=== 2000–2009: Static in Stereo, Go Time, Faster Pussycat, Sin City Sinners ===
Kerns formed the group Static in Stereo with his brothers John and Ryan, and drummer Scott McCargar. The group performed at the Snow Jam festival in Halifax in 2001. They released a self-titled album in 2002. The band was nominated for a Canadian Radio Music Award for "Best New Group" in 2002.

In 2004, Kerns released his first rock solo record Go Time, recorded with members of Zuckerbaby, Static in Stereo and Bif Naked. The next year Kerns produced Britt Black's solo album Blackout.

In 2007, Kerns joined Brent Muscat and Faster Pussycat for their European tour. The same year he formed Sin City Sinners with Brent Muscat. Kerns recorded four studio albums with The Sin City Sinners. The band is known for performing sets of hard rock covers and new originals.

=== 2010–2013: Slash, Apocalyptic Love, etc. ===
In 2010, Kerns, along with Brent Fitz, Myles Kennedy, and Bobby Schneck, joined Slash on the tour supporting his self titled record.

The band also recorded a live concert entitled Made in Stoke 24/7/11 The album was recorded at Victoria Hall in Slash's English birthplace of Stoke-on-Trent, and was released as a double-disc concert set.

Apocalyptic Love was the first of the Slash albums featuring Myles Kennedy and the Conspirators albums. Kerns provided bass and background vocals for this album, which was released on May 22, 2012. The touring line up changed with Frank Sidoris replacing Bobby Schneck on rhythm guitar. The album featured the single "You're a Lie", which hit No. 1 on the active rock music charts in Canada. This record was certified gold in Australia New Zealand, and Poland, and went silver in the UK

=== 2013–2015: World on Fire, album and tour, etc. ===
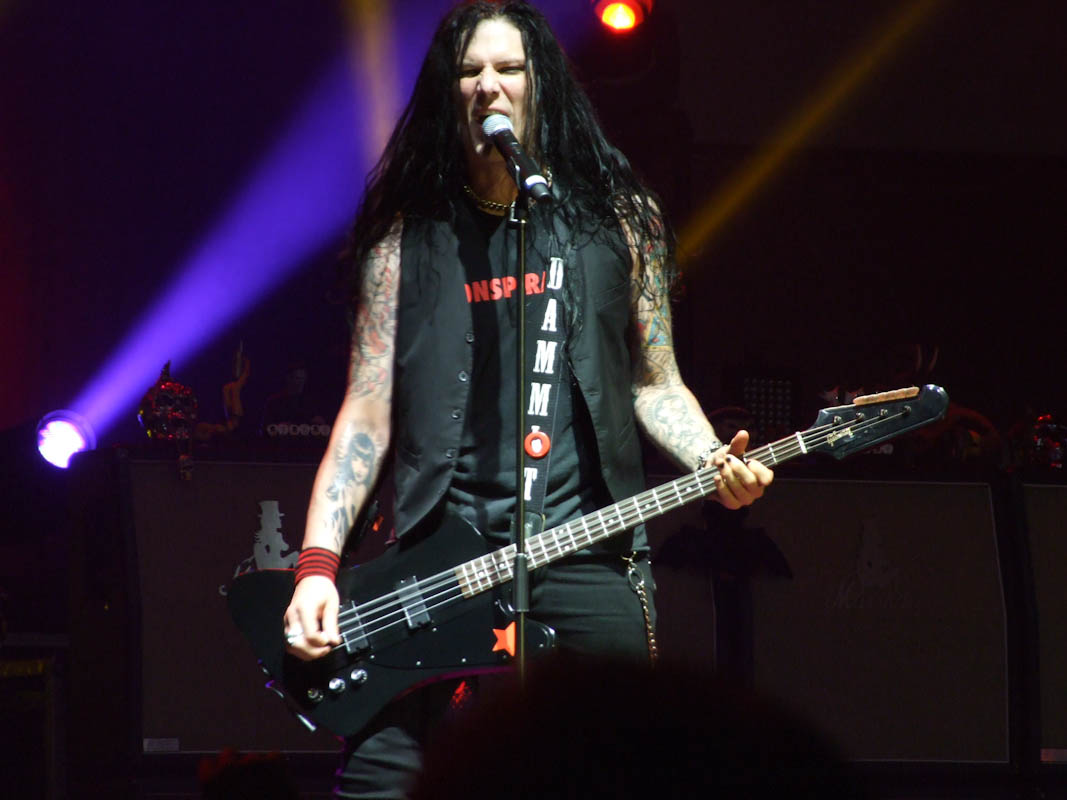
Kerns performing with Slash in Bulgaria in 2015

World on Fire, Slash's second studio album, again featured Kerns, Fitz and Kennedy. This time the record was recorded with Michael "Elvis" Baskette. The album sold around 29,000 copies in the United States in its first week of release to land at position No. 10 on The Billboard 200 chart. The feature single off this album was "World on Fire". The song reached the number one spot on Billboards Mainstream Rock Songs. This tour lasted from July 9, 2014 until December 31, 2015. The record was certified silver in the UK

In 2013, Kerns joined fellow Canadians, Brent Fitz, and Chris Jericho in the Canadian cover band Coverboy.

Kerns released his first acoustic record Borrowing Trouble in 2014. That year he was voted by Loudwire readers as the 2014 Bassist of the Year in the 4th Annual Loudwire Music Awards. In December 2015 Kerns played guitar for Michael Monroe

=== 2016–2017: Toque, The Age of Electric, live DVD, Kiss Kruise, etc. ===
In 2016, Kerns joined Brent Fitz, and Cory Churko in the Canadian cover band Toque. Toque played the 2018 Juno Fest and walked the red carpet. He also released a studio album TKO with Reed Shimozawa (from Zuckerbaby) in 2016.

Kerns appeared in two of Michael Sweet's music videos in 2017. In May that year he joined with People for Animals at The Basement Nashville for a charity show raising over $10,000 for spaying and neutering of animals in the area.

In 2017, Kerns and the rest of The Age of Electric did a cross country 20th anniversary reunion tour. Kerns also joined the cast of Raiding the Rock Vault for the 2017 run in Branson, Missouri. He was also a part of the 1000 show celebrations in Las Vegas.

In 2017, Kerns released his first live DVD Live at the B-side Lounge Toronto. Guitar World Magazine awarded Kerns with the Platinum Award for his 2017 Prestige Todd "Dammit" Kerns Anti-Star VI guitar.

In 2017, Kerns joined Bob and Bruce Kulick on the Kiss Kruise 2017, after appearing on Bob's solo record Skeletons in the Closet Late that year he performed with Dizzy Reed's (from Guns and Roses) side project Hookers & Blow.

=== 2018–2019: Living the Dream, Kiss Kruise, B.C. Entertainment Walk of Fame, etc. ===
On June 17, Slash announced the "Living the Dream 2018" tour. On July 25, the single "Driving Rain" was released; the album was released in September 2018.

Kerns joined Brent Fitz, Zach Throne and Bruce Kulick on the Kiss Kruise Decades at Sea.

In 2018, Kerns received a star on the B.C. Entertainment Walk of Fame, and appeared in the independent film The Whiskey Man and the Rider.

=== 2020–2022: Minefield, podcast and Slash's "4" ===
In early 2020, he released the ten-year anniversary album Exile on Fremont Street, Ten Years in Exile. He was scheduled to join Bruce Kulick on the sold out "Kiss Kruise X" along with Zach Throne and Brent Fitz; however, this was postponed due to COVID-19.

Later that year, he performed a solo acoustic show for Bluesfest Windsor, Windsor, Ontario, and started the new hard rock band, Minefield, with Brandon Fields, Jeremy Asbrock, and Matt Starr. Their debut single was called "Alone Together". He also appeared on David Ellefson's album No Cover on the track "Sweet F A", and then for the Starz program Heels on the track "Run to the Lightning (feat. Todd Kerns) – Coincidental Minors".

In the same year he started a video series titled "Todd Kerns Talks To ..." which are conversations using video conferencing between himself and a guest from the music industry.

On October 22, 2021, Slash feat. Myles Kennedy and the Conspirators released a new single entitled "The River is Rising" and revealed, through social networks, the title of their next studio album: 4. On December 3, 2021, the second single from the album was released: "Fill My World", on all digital platforms.

Todd Kerns performed on Kiss Kruise 11 (week 1 and 2) with the Bruce Kulick band and the All Star Jam.

Frontiers Music Srl announced the signing of a new trio, Heroes and Monsters. Formed by three rock n' roll lifers and friends, bassist/vocalist Todd Kerns, guitarist Stef Burns, and drummer Will Hunt, the band's debut album will be released in early 2023.

Todd Kerns speaks at INDIE WEEK CANADA November 11, 2022.

== Other ==
Kerns launched his own clothing line called "Dammitwear / Anti-Star designs".

== Discography ==
=== Smash L.A. ===
- 1989/1990 - Law 'N' Authority

=== The Age of Electric ===
- 1991 - The Latest Plague
- 1995 - The Age of Electric
- 1997 - Make a Pest a Pet

EP's

- 1990 - Electric
- 1993 - The Ugly EP
- 2017 - The Pretty EP

=== Static in Stereo ===
- 2002 - Static in Stereo

=== Todd Kerns solo ===
- 2004 - Go Time!
- 2013 - Borrowing Trouble
- 2017 - TKO

=== Slash solo ===
- 2010 - Slash

=== Slash feat. Myles Kennedy & the Conspirators ===
- 2012 - Apocalyptic Love
- 2014 - World on Fire
- 2018 - Living the Dream
- 2022 - 4
- 2027 - Flying Blind

Live Albums

- 2010 - Live in Manchester 3 July 2010
- 2012 - Made in Stoke 24/7/11
- 2015 - Live at the Roxy 9.25.14
- 2019 - Living the Dream Tour
- 2022 - Live at Studios 60

=== Sin City Sinners ===
- 2010 - Exile On Freemont Street
- 2011 - A Sinners’ Christmas
- 2013 - Divebar Days Revisited

EP's

- 2010 - Broken Record
- 2013 - Christmas in Vegas

=== Toque ===
- 2016 - Give'r
- 2019 - Never Enough

=== Bob Kulick solo ===
- 2017 - Skeletons in the Closet

=== Minefield ===
- 2021 - Not On Level

=== The Tea Party ===
- 2021 - Blood Moon Rising

=== Original Sin ===
- 2021 - Exile On Fremont Street: Ten Years In Exile

=== Blackbird Angels ===
- 2023 - Solsorte

=== Heroes and Monsters ===
- 2023 - Heroes and Monsters

=== Sebastian Bach solo ===
- 2024 - Child Within the Man

=== Various ===
- 1991 - Z99 Streetrock '91 / C95 Cityworks '91
- 1997 - Matthew Good Band - Underdogs
- 1997 - Matthew Good Band – Lo-Fi B-Sides (EP)
- 1999 - Matthew Good Band – Beautiful Midnight
- 2000 - Zuckerbaby – Platinum Again
- 2000 - Horsey - Original Motion Picture Soundtrack
- 2002 - Buried Heart Project – The Streets Where You Live
- 2002 - Tuuli – Here We Go
- 2003 – Undressed: An Unmasked Tribute To Kiss
- 2005 - Neverending White Lights – Act 1: Goodbye Friends Of The Heavenly Bodies
- 2006 - Bif Naked – Superbeautifulmonster
- 2006 - Superbeing – Bright Idea
- 2014 - Red Dragon Cartel – Red Dragon Cartel
- 2020 - Ellefson – No Cover
- 2023 - Jason Bieler And The Baron Von Bielski Orchestra – Postcards From The Asylum
