= Bombargo =

Canadian indie pop band formed 2013

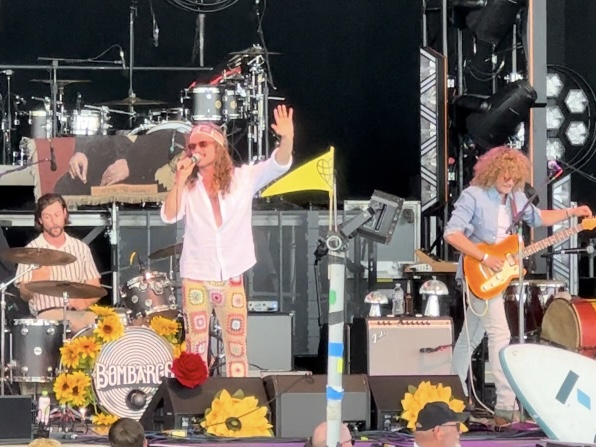

Background information
- Origin: Saskatoon, Saskatchewan, Canada
- Genres: Indie pop
- Years active: 2013–present
- Label: Independent
- Members: Nathan Thoen; Anthony Thoen; Spencer Chilliak; Matt Folkersen; Sammy Lee Folkersen; Connor Newton; Niall Cubbon
- Website: Official site

Bombargo is an independent pop band from Saskatoon, Saskatchewan, formed in 2013 by Nathan Thoen and Spencer Chilliak.

== History ==
Nathan Thoen and Spencer Chilliak were inspired to start a band after attending the Sasquatch Music Festival. In 2017, Nathan convinced Anthony to join after his own band, Black Vienna, had ended. Anthony then quit his job in San Francisco and moved back to Saskatoon to be part of the band. The remainder of the 7-piece group consists of brothers Matt Folkerson (keyboards) and Sammy Folkersen (bass), Connor Newton (saxophone), and Niall Cubbon (drums).

== Releases ==
=== Back on Main and We Are Bombargo (2015-2017) ===
In 2015, the duo released their debut EP titled Back on Main which would go on to be included in "The Top 10 Best Saskatchewan Albums of 2015". The band donated all proceeds to the Red Cross to help those impacted and displaced by the forest fires that devastated northern Saskatchewan that year. The second track, "Let It Grow" has amassed over 6 million listens.

The band released their first full length album titled We Are Bombargo in May 2017. The album single "Pour Me Another" gained play on mainstream radio. The song's music video, filmed by Anthony Thoen, illustrates a cautionary tale about the risks of alcohol. The video stars Thoen’s uncle Scott, a Sam Elliott doppelgänger who was 32 years sober at the time of the shoot.

The track "Heros Never Die" from the album was inspired by Michelle Curtis, who died trying to save several children from a rip tide at Broad Cove beach in Cape Breton in 2015. Thoen was visiting the area in the days following the tragedy and could not think about Michelle's act of bravery without being overcome with emotion. "It's one of the saddest stories I have ever heard in my life," he said.

=== Mr. No Good and Oxygen (2017-2019) ===
In December 2017, Bombargo released their single titled "Mr. No Good" which Taylor Swift added to her Spotify playlist "Songs Taylor Loves" in February 2018. Bombargo was the only unsigned Canadian artist on the 43 track playlist which featured established international artists including Kendrick Lamar, Camila Cabella, and Ed Sheeran.

In August 2018, Bombargo released their single "Oxygen" which peaked at No. 41 on the Billboard Canada Hot AC chart. Following the track's radio success, Bombargo made their US touring debut in September 2019 as part of their 33-date "North American Dream Tour".

=== Nebula (2020-2025) ===
To help with the release of the album, Bombargo set up a Kickstarter fundraising drive with a goal of $12,000. The album went on to be titled Nebula with a scheduled release date of May 27th 2022. On January 28th 2022, they released the first single "Too Close for Comfort." They followed that up with the release of their second single "Somedays" on February 25th 2022. In April, 2024, Bombargo released “Pieces of My Heart” and announced an accompanying tour across the United States, where they were a supporting act for Michael Franti on his “Togetherness Tour.” As of 2025, Bombargo has planned to release one single per month for the rest of year; and set out on the “Stay Groovy” tour.

Love, In Spite of Everything (2026-present)

On June 2nd, 2026, Bombargo announced their next studio album: Love, In Spite of Everything set to release August 28th, 2026; along with an accompanying single “How Will I Ever Fall In Love Again” to be released June 5th, 2026. Also announced 39 US dates for the fall under the “Love, In Spite of Everything Tour.”

== Personal life ==
Born in Saskatoon, Saskatchewan, Nathan and Anthony Thoen were raised in Prince Albert, Saskatchewan. While growing up, the brothers took guitar lessons from Byron Matice. The two attended high school at Carlton Comprehensive High School.

After graduation, they both attended the University of Saskatchewan in Saskatoon. In 2011, Nathan built and captained a team to Edmonton to compete in the first Canadian National Championship of yukigassen.

Nathan and Anthony met with the Optimist Club in Saskatoon to discuss their idea of a tubing and ski hill in Saskatoon. After speaking to the city hall on behalf of the snowboarding community, Nathan and Anthony became Optimist Hill supporters and brand ambassadors for the project. The brothers helped fundraise, plan, design, and promote the local project.

In 2015, Nathan and a friend went on a trip in a 1984 Toyota Camper van down the west coast of Canada and the United States capturing people's dreams called "The Dream Journey".

On January 31, 2016, Nathan and Yukigassen Team Canada organized the world's largest snowball fight in Victoria Park in Saskatoon and received a Guinness world record.

In 2016, Nathan was asked to give a speech to the graduating class of 2016 at Carlton Comprehensive High School.

In 2020, Spencer Chilliak and Anthony Thoen were featured in Bill & Ted Face the Music.

== Band members ==
- Nathan Thoen – Lead vocals (Current)
- Spencer Chilliak – Lead guitar, backing vocals (Current)
- Anthony Thoen – Guitar (Current)
- Matthew Folkersen – Keyboard, backing vocals (Past)
- Sammy Lee Folkersen – Bass guitar, backing vocals (Current)
- "Rootin' Tootin'" Connor Newton – Saxophone (Past)
- Niall Cubbon – Drums (Current)

== Discography ==
Bombargo discography
- Studio albums: 2
- EPs: 1
- Live albums: 1
- Singles: 18
- Music videos: 7

=== Albums ===
==== Studio albums ====
Title	Details
We Are Bombargo	Released: 1 May 2017; Label: Independent; Format: Digital download, streaming
Nebula	Release: 27 May 2022; Label: Independent; Format: CD, vinyl, digital download, streaming

==== Live albums ====
Title	Details
Bombargo (Live at the Sugarshack Sessions)	Released: 12 April 2024; Label: Sugarshack; Format: Digital download, streaming

=== Extended plays ===
Title	Details
Back on Main	Release: 23 October 2015; Label: Independent; Format: Digital download

=== Singles ===
Title	Year	Chart Position	Album
Title	Year	CAN Hot AC	Album
"Little Bit More"	2016	—	Non-album single
"Pour Me Another"	2017	—	We Are Bombargo
"Mr. No Good"	2017	—	Non-album singles
"Waiting on You	2018	—	Non-album singles
"Share the light"	2018	—	Non-album singles
"All the Same"	2018	—	Non-album singles
"Oxygen"	2018	41	Non-album singles
"Already There"	2019	—	Non-album singles
"Delivery Guy"	2020	—	Non-album singles
"Too Close For Comfort"	2022	—	Nebula
"Somedays"	2022	—	Nebula
"Can't Stop"	2022	—	Nebula
"Pieces of My Heart"	2024	—	Non-album single
"I Could Really Use That"	2025	—	Non-album single
"Higher Than the Ceiling"	2025	—	Non-album single
"The Goodtime Guarantee"	2025	—	Non-album single
"Coming Back Around"	2025	—	Non-album single
"Walking on Water"	2025	—	Non-album single
"—" denotes releases that did not chart.

=== Music videos ===
Year	Title	Album
2015	"Precious Time (Lately)"	—N/a
2016	"Let it Grow"	Back on Main
2016	"Little Bit More"	—N/a
2017	"Pour Me Another"	—N/a
2018	"Oxygen" (featuring Bryce + Hailey)	—N/a
2019	"Already There"	—N/a
2020	"Delivery Guy"	—N/a
2022	"Too Close for Comfort"	Nebula
2022	"Somedays"	Nebula
