= Heaven Is for Easy Girls =

Studio album by The Awkward Stage
- Released: 2006
- Genre: Indie pop
- Label: Mint Records

The Awkward Stage chronology
Heaven Is for Easy Girls (2006)	Slimming Mirrors, Flattering Lights (2008)

Professional ratings
Review scores
Source	Rating
Allmusic	link

Heaven Is for Easy Girls is the debut album by Canadian indie pop band The Awkward Stage, released in 2006 on Mint Records.

== Track listing ==
1. The Morons Are Winning
2. So Stupid, So Smart
3. Heaven Is for Easy Girls
4. Sad Girl Radio
5. I Drive
6. We're Going for a Ride
7. T-Rexia Nervosa
8. I Love You, Hipster Darling
9. 1000 Teenage Hearts
10. Room Tone
11. Circus Ends in Tears (Pachrymosa)
12. West Van Girl
