= Slow Down, Molasses =

Canadian indie rock band formed 2006

Slow Down Molasses
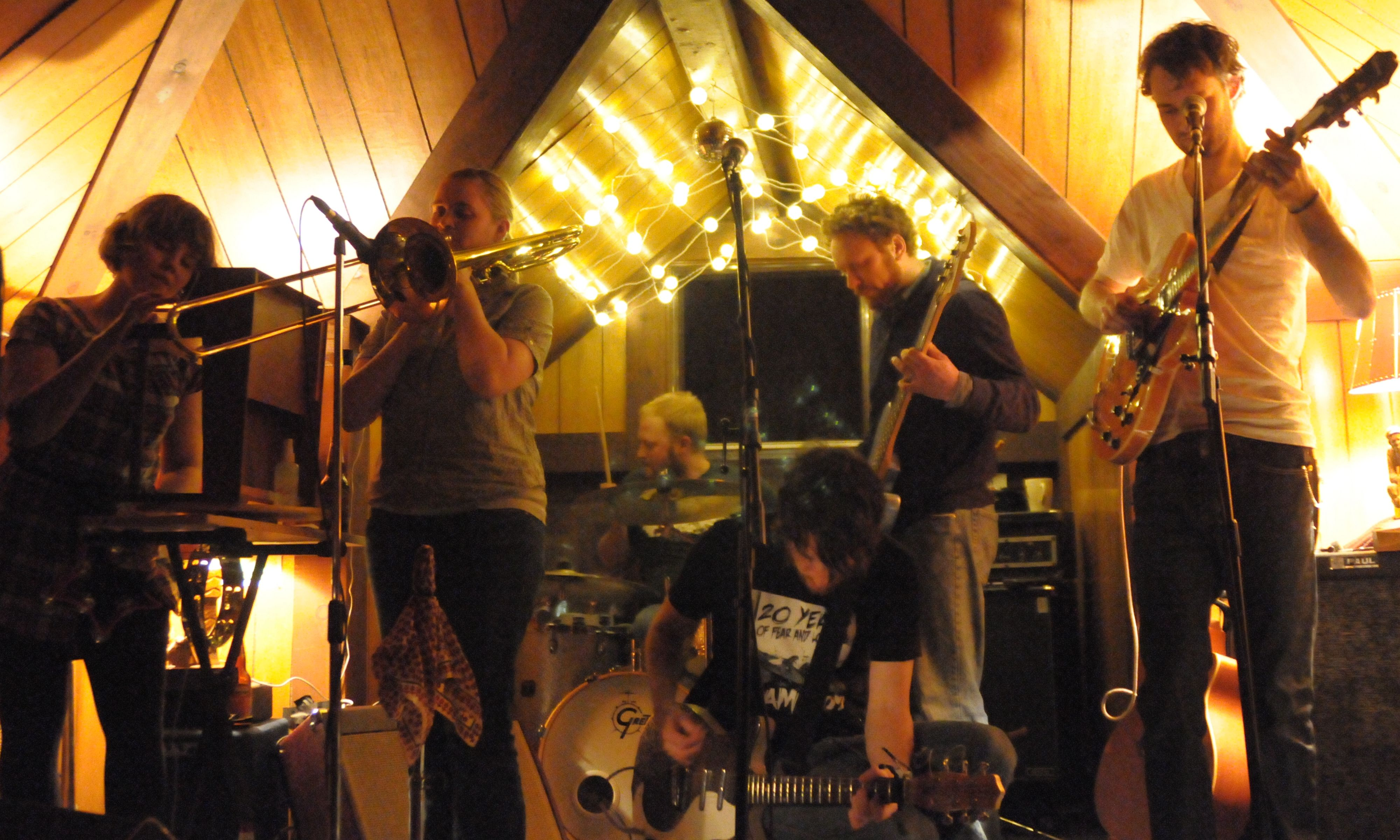
- Slow Down, Molasses, April 2009

Background information
- Origin: Saskatoon, Saskatchewan
- Genres: Indie rock
- Years active: 2006–present
- Labels: Noyes Records, Culvert Music
- Members: Tyson McShane; Aaron Scholz; Levi Soulodre; Chris Morin; Jordan Kurtz
- Past members: Jeanette Neufeld; Ryan Kitchen (né Drabble); Patrick Schmidt; Paul Ross; Kristine Eggertson; Quentin Reschny
- Website: www.slowdownmolasses.com

Slow Down Molasses is a Canadian indie rock band from Saskatoon, Saskatchewan. The current five piece lineup consists of Tyson McShane, Aaron Scholz, Levi Soulodre, Chris Morin and Jordan Kurtz. The band's sound and roster has changed dramatically over the course of its history; having evolved, in the words of Exclaim! "from a sprawling art-pop collective (at one point including 14 members) into a more muscular, shoegaze-y, post-punk outfit."

Slow Down Molasses have released four full-length records since their inception in 2006. 2011's self-released Walk Into the Sea included collaborations with musicians Julie Doiron and Olenka Krakus. Their most recent full-length 100% Sunshine (2016) was recorded by Barrett Ross and Chad Munson at Ghetto Box Studios in Saskatoon, SK, and mixed by Tony Doogan (Mogwai, Belle and Sebastian) at Castle Of Doom in Glasgow, Scotland.

Slow Down Molasses have toured extensively across their native North America, making regular appearances at music festivals SXSW, CMJ, NXNE, Pop Montreal, Halifax Pop Explosion, and Sled Island. Internationally they've been a part of Germany's Reeperbahn Festival, Great Escape Festival, Liverpool Sound City, and End Of The Road in the UK, Nouvelle Prague in the Czech Republic, BIME Festival in Spain, and the Netherlands' Incubate Festival,

They have shared the stage with The New Pornographers, Built To Spill, The Besnard Lakes, Animal Collective, Savages, Swervedriver, Preoccupations (formerly Viet Cong), and Ladyhawk, among others.

== Discography ==
=== Albums ===
- I'm An Old Believer (2008)
- Walk Into The Sea (2011)
- Burnt Black Cars (2015)
- 100% Sunshine (2016)

=== Singles/EPs ===
- Slow Down Molasses (2007)
- City Sublet (2012)
- Summer Sun b/w Winter Sun (2014)
