= Made (band) =

Canadian lo-fi pop band active during 90s

Made (stylized as MAdE) was a lo-fi pop band from Toronto, Ontario, Canada, active during the 1990s. Its members were Jason Taylor (lead vocals and guitar), Simon Bedford-James (guitar), Alison McLean (drums), and three different successive bass guitarists: John Bowker, later replaced by Scott Fairbrother, who was in turn replaced by Frank Guidoccio.

== History ==
Made began performing at clubs in Toronto in 1994, and recorded two independent albums: Rumball and Big Brother. The first of these was released in late 1993 and cost about $300 to record. In 1995, they landed a deal with MCA Records. This resulted in MCA releasing their third album and major-label debut, Bedazzler, on January 28, 1997 in Canada. The album was re-released on January 29, 1997 on Universal Music Canada, and on May 20, 1997 on MCA in the United States. Writing for the Sun-Sentinel, Toni Birghenthal described the album as "fabulously put together and simply presented."

   Made went to Chicago to record with Keith Cleverley but after several months of recording ,Universal declined to release the finished product "Television Heart" which Made eventually put out as a very limited release indy lp. 
  The band embarked on more touring and live gigging after the original guitarist left the band to be replace by Justin McWilliams. the band broke up in 2000.
