= Ghosts of Modern Man =

Canadian band

- Origin: Regina, Saskatchewan, Canada
- Genres: Alternative rock, Punk
- Years active: 1994–present
- Label: Smallman Records
- Members: Jonah Krieser; Jamie Deal; Stacey Hahn; Tristan Helgason
- Past members: Chris McBennet

Ghosts of Modern Man are an alternative rock band that was formed in Regina, Saskatchewan, in 1994.

== Early days ==
In 1994, Jonah Krieser and Jamie Deal, along with drummer Chris McBennet, began playing together as Pillar. Throughout the late nineties, the group of young teenagers played locally in their hometown of Regina as well as at a number of festivals including NXNE, Canadian Music Week, and Molson DV8.

In 2001, Pillar independently released their debut album, Everyone is as Terrified as You Are. The album featured 10 tracks of what they referred to as "Alternative Emo Punk". Exclaim! gave Everyone… a mixed review. While praising the leadoff track, "Matter Of Time", as a "perfectly timed airy swell [that] gives way to an urgent full-band assault", the Exclaim! reviewer felt the remaining tracks suffered in comparison to its quality and that "Krieser's yells are inspired and highly developed, but his true skill is found in his toned-down singing voice".

== National tour ==
In preparation for the extensive touring in support of the album, the band brought second guitarist Stacey Hahn on board to round out their live sound. The band decided to change their name following a legal threat from a Christian Rap-Metal band also named Pillar. The name, Ghosts of Modern Man, came from the subject matter of their songs and their concern about "the demise of modern man, modern civilization. How we just eat everything up and turn it into plastic".

With the new lineup and new name, the band began touring nationally and from 2002 to 2003 played over 200 shows across Canada. This touring schedule assisted them in selling out of the first pressing of the 2000 copies of their debut release. As part of their development into Ghosts of Modern Man, they chose not to re-press their first release but to instead wait until they could return to the studio with their new songs.

In July 2004, drummer Chris McBennet left the band and was replaced by Tristan Helgason. Helgason was a veteran of the Regina music scene when he joined, playing with Filmmaker and 400 Strong.

== City of No Light ==
In the Spring of 2005, GOMM released the album City of No Light to positive reviews. The Winnipeg Sun gave a rating of 3.5 stars of 5 and wrote that their "searing blend of churning guitar, bristling impatience, tense dynamics, lyrical angst and anguished vocals ensures they'll please the punk purists" but also praised them as a possible punk future for expanding "their horizons by being unafraid of sweet harmonies, pretty melodies and the odd earnest ballad".

Chart agreed with the Sun's evaluation of playing "fast, loose and forever on the edge of the rules" of punk saying "while they do chaos great, GOMM are also quite adept at slowing things down." "The comparatively mellow 'Dust'", for example, "is a model of restraint and understatement when held against the band's otherwise abrasive, scattershot indie."

== Band members ==
- Jonah Krieser - Guitar, Vocals (1994–present)
- Jamie Deal - Bass (1994–present)
- Stacey Hahn - Guitar, Backing Vocals (2001–present)
- Tristan Helgason - Drums (2004–present)

=== Former members ===
- Chris McBennet - Drums (1994–2004)

== Discography ==
=== Albums ===
- Everyone is as Terrified as You Are as Pillar (2001)
- City of No Light (2005)

=== Music videos ===
- "Sleeping At The Switch" (2005)

== See also ==
- List of bands from Canada
