= Ryan Dahle =

Canadian musician

- Born: 1970 (age 54–55)
- Origin: Canada
- Genres: Rock
- Occupation: Guitarist
- Instrument: Guitar
- Website: www.ryandahle.com

Ryan Dahle (born 1970) is a Canadian musician, best known for his contributions to the bands Age of Electric and Limblifter, each of which have scored several major radio hits.

== The Age of Electric ==
The Age of Electric was a band founded in 1989 that consisted of two sets of brothers, Ryan and Kurt Dahle, and Todd and John Kerns. Originally named just "Electric", the band got their start by playing original music in cover song clubs. Playing four long sets of music, six nights a week sometimes 48 weeks a year, they not only learned to play but learned how to perform in these rugged bars and pubs of Western Canada.

In 1994, The Age of Electric released the Ugly EP, which sold well independently. The group gave Cargo Records the rights to distribute the EP, and its title track peaked at #11 on the Canadian Rock Radio Charts with no major label help. Invasion Group Management in New York later helped with the promotion of the album. Innovative videos for the Ryan Dahle penned singles "Ugly" and "Untitled" made a big impact at Muchmusic, Canada's version of MTV. No major label deal was in sight, so the group decided to continue to release independently, an LP called The Age of Electric.

In 1995, the group got signed simultaneously to Mercury Records US and Universal Music in Canada, and re-released The Age of Electric. In 1996, they commenced recording their first major label record and what would be their final, Make a Pest a Pet.

== Transitional years ==
In 1995, Ryan, Kurt and bassist Ian Somers formed Limblifter as a vehicle for the surplus songs Ryan had been writing for The Age of Electric. Signing simultaneous record deals with Mercury Records (US) and MCA in Canada, Ryan and Kurt's record deals were now at highest count four. They released a self-titled debut album, which spawned three Canadian top-40 hits, "Tinfoil", "Vicious", and "Screwed It Up". The first single was released in the US the same week their A&R man was fired at Mercury and despite an extremely promising and coveted most added single at rock radio in Billboard magazine, the record was quietly shelved by the label. The project would be put on hiatus soon thereafter, and the brothers once again began to focus on their first group.

Ian Somers would soon move on to form and write for a new band, Brundlefly, releasing two critically acclaimed albums, Locked in This House (1999) and By the Way (2002).

In 1997, Age of Electric released Make a Pest a Pet, which would be the band's best-selling record. Spawning their biggest single "Remote Control", also written by Ryan Dahle, garnered heavy airplay at radio and reached #5 on the Muchmusic Countdown. In March 1998, shortly after calling it quits, Age of Electric was (somewhat inappropriately) nominated for Best New Group at the Juno Awards. The Juno went to the band Leahy.

Make a Pest a Pet was certified Gold in Canada, just after they disbanded.

== Limblifter ==
The Dahles once again focused on Limblifter, and released their second album Bellaclava in 2000. Although the album didn't have the commercial success of the band's first album, it did spawn two popular radio singles, "Ariel vs. Lotus" and "Wake Up To The Sun". However, the band didn't have a chance to follow up on their success, as Kurt left the band to concentrate on the celebrated independent band The New Pornographers.

Faced with financial shortages, Ryan Dahle lay dormant for a while before recruiting former Matthew Good Band drummer Ian Browne and a few other musicians for a short-lived, but highly anticipated band named Alarm Bell. The group never released any albums or singles, though they did release several demos that would eventually find their way onto Limblifter's third album (including "Get Money", "Fiercely Co-Dependent", and "Perfect Day to Disappear").

Ryan would return to his major project, Limblifter, and recruit a new group of musicians, including Megan Bradfield, Dave Patterson, and studio drummer Pat Steward. The band released its third album, I/O in 2004, and toured across Canada as openers for Matthew Good's solo act, during the Put Out Your Lights tour.

== Producing work and solo career ==
Dahle produced the album Future Breeds by Canadian band Hot Hot Heat, released in 2010. He also produced the eponymous album The Manvils in 2009, as well as co-producing k-os' 2013 album BLack on BLonde. Dahle completed a solo record, Irrational Anthems, which was released on September 22, 2009 through Fontana North.

As of 2013, he is a member of the band Mounties, alongside Steve Bays of Hot Hot Heat and singer-songwriter Hawksley Workman.
