= Despistado =

Canadian indie rock band

- Origin: Regina, Saskatchewan, Canada
- Genres: Indie rock
- Years active: 2001–2004, 2013–present
- Labels: Jade Tree
- Past members: Dagan Harding; Leif Thorseth; Joel Passmore; Brenan Schwartz

Despistado is a Canadian indie rock band from Regina, Saskatchewan.

== History ==
Despistado was active from 2001 to 2004, and 2013–present. The band consisted of vocalist and guitarist Dagan Harding, guitarist Leif Thorseth, bassist Joel Passmore and drummer Brenan Schwartz.

Despistado released their first EP, The Emergency Response EP in 2002 (produced by David j Taylor); it was subsequently re-released in 2004 on Jade Tree Records. Widely hyped as a "next big thing", the band's single "A Stirstick's Prediction" was used in a commercial for T-Mobile. In 2004, "A Stirstick's Prediction" was contributed to the compilation album, Take Action! Vol 4.

After many cross-Canada tours in 2004 and touring through the U.S., the band was left exhausted and riven by personal and business tensions. They subsequently returned home to prepare for an international tour in the fall of 2004 with The Weakerthans. However, due to stresses of touring life, and a lack of shared business goals, the band suffered their first break up. Subsequently, their full-length album The People of and Their Verses was digitally released on Jade Tree in December of 2005.

The band undertook a reunion tour in 2009 and again reunited in 2013 for a tour through Western Canada, performing some new material during the latter tour. The band planned for a vinyl reissue of The People of and Their Verses, and have acknowledged but not yet officially confirmed to the media the possibility of recording a new album in the future.

Their latest EP, Nocturnal Anthem, was released on Grind Central Records on October 2021.

== Discography ==
- The Emergency Response (2002)
- The People of and Their Verses (2005)
- Nocturnal Anthem (2021)

== See also ==
- Music of Canada
- Music of Saskatchewan
- Canadian rock
- List of Canadian musicians
- List of bands from Canada
- Category:Canadian musical groups
