= Static in Stereo =

Canadian band

- Origin: Canada
- Genres: Alternative rock
- Past members: Todd Kerns; John Kerns; Ryan Kerns; Scott McCargar

Static in Stereo is a Canadian band consisting of vocalist/guitarist Todd Kerns, his brothers John Kerns and Ryan Kerns, and drummer Scott McCargar. Their debut album Static in Stereo released 9 July 2001 and spawned a Canadian television and radio hit "Before My Time". In 2002, the band was nominated for a Canadian Radio Music Award for "Best New Group".

== History ==
After ten years of accumulating success in the 1990s as Canadian alternative rock-band The Age of Electric, the band eventually dissolved to form other musical projects, one of which was Static in Stereo. Two of the band members, also brothers, Todd and John Kerns teamed up to form Static in Stereo with the goal of creating an album reminiscent of their musical influences growing up in Lanigan, Saskatchewan. In 2001, Static in Stereo released their self-titled album that documented their struggles and new-found energy after the break-up of The Age of Electric.

=== From The Age of Electric to Static in Stereo ===
Before Static in Stereo was The Age of Electric, which was hailed as one of Canada's leading alternative rock bands of the 1990s. The group consisted of Todd and John Kerns and brothers Ryan and Kurt Dahle. The group met while growing up in Saskatchewan and formed The Age of Electric in 1989. The group received some success with the release of their EP Ugly in 1993; however, their commercial triumph followed the major label releases of their two last albums The Age of Electric (1995) and Make a Pest a Pet (1997). The band's last album went gold in Canada (sold more than 50,000 albums). Their hard-rock edge attracted audiences as they toured with bands such as Our Lady Peace. By the late 1990s, the Dahle brothers had begun releasing albums with their side project Limblifter and the Kerns brothers had begun writing music that was going in a different direction. In 1999, the band broke up and soon Static in Stereo was formed.

=== Static in Stereo ===
The entire album is written in quasi-diary form, as each song chronicles the obstacles the band faced after The Age of Electric. The track "Wrapped in Cellophane" describes the musical and personal metamorphosis that the band members experienced in the months before recording the album. Musically, the album pays homage to the bands that inspired Static in Stereo, such as The Rolling Stones, The Clash, and Kiss. The different musical style of each band member is present throughout the album. Elements of punk, glam rock, country and rock 'n' roll can be heard in the musical arrangements of the instruments and vocals. Hard driving guitar and heavy bass are present in most of the tracks. Although the music has a gritty, loud, hard rock sound similar to late metal or grunge, it plays a backseat role to the vocals in both primacy and depth. The sentimentality and honesty of the lyrics allow for the listener to connect with the music, at the same time satisfying the Rock 'N' Roll criteria.
