= Limblifter =

Canadian alternative rock band

- Limblifter performing in 2024

Background information
- Origin: Vancouver, British Columbia, Canada
- Genres: Alternative rock
- Years active: 1995–2005, 2012–2016, 2020–present
- Labels: Universal Music; Limblifter Records
- Members: Ryan Dahle; Megan Bradfield; Jo Hirabayashi; Jeremy Taggart
- Past members: Kurt Dahle; Ian Somers; Pat Steward; Brent Follett; Todd Fancey; David Patterson; Gregory Macdonald; Eric Breitenbach
- Website: limblifter.com

Limblifter is a Canadian alternative rock group from Vancouver, formed in 1995.

== History ==
The group was originally formed by brothers Ryan Dahle and Kurt Dahle, as a side project from their main band, The Age of Electric, along with a third member, Ian Somers. Their self-titled 1996 album, recorded after a mere 10 practices, spawned the Canadian rock radio hits "Screwed It Up", "Tinfoil", and "Vicious", but the band was hindered by staff alterations at their label Mercury Records. The band went on hiatus while Age of Electric was touring their 1997 album, Make a Pest a Pet.

When AOE subsequently broke up, Limblifter became the Dahles' primary band. On April 2, 1998, Somers announced he was leaving the band. Todd Fancey joined the band as their new bassist. In 2000, the band released their second album, Bellaclava. Although that release wasn't as successful commercially as Limblifter, the singles "Ariel vs. Lotus" and "Wake Up to the Sun" were popular on radio.

Kurt Dahle and Todd Fancey subsequently left the band in 2001 to concentrate on The New Pornographers. In 2002, Ryan Dahle formed the band "Alarm Bell" with guitarist David Patterson, ex-Matthew Good Band drummer Ian Browne and Matthew Camirand. Camirand later left Alarm Bell and was replaced by Megan Bradfield. In 2004, Dahle, Patterson, Bradfield, and new drummer Brent Follett revived Limblifter. The band released the album I/O in 2004.

Bradfield, Steward and Dahle have all gone on to work with Matthew Good, with Steward becoming Good's new drummer for his subsequent solo career after his band, the Matthew Good Band, became defunct.

After being inactive from 2006 to 2011, Limblifter began playing shows again in 2012. The band's fourth album, Pacific Milk, was released on April 7, 2015. Their fifth album, Little Payne, was released on October 31, 2022.

Jeremy Taggart, formerly of Our Lady Peace, has been drumming for Limblifter since 2024.

== Discography ==
=== Albums ===
- Limblifter (1996, 2012 remaster)
- Bellaclava (2000, 2020 remaster)
- I/O (2004)
- Pacific Milk (2015)
- Little Payne (2022)

=== Singles ===
| Year | Song | Chart peak | | Album |
| Year | Song | CAN | CAN Rock/Alt. | Album |
|---|---|---|---|---|
| 1996 | "Screwed It Up" | 69 | 14 | Limblifter |
| 1996 | "Tinfoil" | — | — | Limblifter |
| 1996 | "Vicious" | — | — | Limblifter |
| 2000 | "Ariel vs. Lotus" | — | 13 | Bellaclava |
| 2000 | "Wake Up to the Sun" | — | 15 | Bellaclava |
"—" denotes a release that did not chart.

=== Music videos ===
- Perfect Day To Disappear (2005)
- Wake Up To The Sun
- Cordova
- Vicious
- On The Moon
- Ariel Vs Lotus
- Tinfoil
