= The Age of Electric =

Canadian rock band

- Origin: Regina, Saskatchewan, Canada
- Genre: Alternative rock
- Years active: 1989–1998, 2015–2017
- Labels: Gods Teeth Ethel!, Mercury
- Members: Ryan Dahle; Todd Kerns; John Kerns; Kurt Dahle
- Website: theageofelectric.com (defunct)

The Age of Electric was a Canadian rock band founded in 1989 with members from Lanigan and Regina, Saskatchewan. The members were Todd Kerns (vocals/guitar), Ryan Dahle (guitar/backing vocals), John Kerns (bass), and Kurt Dahle (drums/backing vocals).

== History ==
The Age of Electric band was conceived by Todd Kerns and Kurt Dahle circa 1986 and was born in April 1989, after waiting for their two younger brothers, John Kerns and Ryan Dahle, to graduate high school. The Dahle brothers traveled two hours north from their home in Regina, Saskatchewan to the Kerns brothers small home town of Lanigan.

The band's commercial breakthrough came with their independent EP Ugly in 1993, which set the stage for the major label release of their self-titled album in 1995.

In 1996, the Dahle brothers released an album with their side project Limblifter, which was also commercially successful in Canada.

The band then released Make a Pest a Pet in 1997. The album produced the radio hit "Remote Control", which peaked at No. 9 on the singles chart in Canada and was later put on MuchMusic's diamond-certified compilation album, Big Shiny Tunes 2. Although it was the band's most successful album yet, being certified gold in Canada in 1998, tensions within the band led the group to break up after a 1998 tour as the opening band for Our Lady Peace. That year the band was nominated for a Juno Award as best new group.

The Kerns brothers then went on to form Static in Stereo with other members, including their brother Ryan. Dahle went on to work with The New Pornographers. Todd Kerns became the bass player and backing vocalist for Slash's band, The Conspirators, and has been inducted into the B.C. Hall of Fame.

== Reunion ==
The Age of Electric performed a reunion show in Calgary on August 29, 2015, their first public performance together in 17 years. Zuckerbaby was the opening act.

In 2016, the band announced plans to release a remastered, expanded two-LP vinyl reissue of Make A Pest A Pet in February 2017 to celebrate its 20th anniversary. Simultaneously, the band announced plans to release a new four-song EP the same month. The song "Keys" was released as the lead single from the new EP in November 2016. Both the Make a Pest a Pet reissue and the new EP, titled The Pretty EP, were released on February 17, 2017.

In March 2017, to celebrate the 20th anniversary of Make a Pest a Pet, and to promotes its reissue and The Pretty EP, the band conducted a two-week cross-Canada tour.

== Discography ==
=== Albums ===
- The Latest Plague (1991), Gods Teeth Ethel Records
- The Age of Electric (June 1 1995), Gods Teeth Ethel Records
- Make a Pest a Pet (1997), Universal Music

=== EPs ===
- Electric (1990), Independent
- The Ugly EP (1993), Gods Teeth Ethel Records
- The Pretty EP (2017), We Are Busy Bodies

== Singles ==
Year	Song	Chart peak			Album
Year	Song	CAN	CAN Alt	CAN Rock	Album
1991	"Aphrodisiac Smile"	-	-	-	The Latest Plague
1995	"Ugly"	80	-	-	The Age of Electric
1995	"Untitled"	50	24	-	The Age of Electric
1995	"Enya"	-	-	-	The Age of Electric
1997	"Remote Control"	9	10	-	Make a Pest a Pet
1997	"I Don't Mind"	59	-	34	Make a Pest a Pet
1997	"Don't Wreck It"	42	-	-	Make a Pest a Pet
2016	"Keys"	-	-	-	The Pretty EP
"—" denotes a release that did not chart.
