= Afterparty Babies =

Studio album by Cadence Weapon
- Released: March 4, 2008
- Recorded: May 2006 – April 2007
- Studios: Up in Arms (Edmonton, Alberta)
- Genres: Alternative hip-hop; electronic
- Length: 57:40
- Labels: Upper Class; Anti-; Big Dada
- Producers: Cadence Weapon; DJ Weezl

Cadence Weapon chronology
Breaking Kayfabe (2005)	Afterparty Babies (2008)	Hope in Dirt City (2012)

Singles from Afterparty Babies
- 1. "House Music" Released: February 12, 2008

Afterparty Babies is the second album by Canadian rapper Cadence Weapon, released on March 4, 2008, by Anti-Records and Upper Class Recordings in the United States and Canada and March 10, 2008, by Big Dada in the United Kingdom. After signing with U.S. label Anti- and the re-release of his debut album Breaking Kayfabe, he spent eleven months in his hometown of Edmonton to work on new material for his next record.

Whereas Breaking Kayfabe used heavy beats and grime from the electronic genre for its overall sound, Afterparty Babies has a club-feel throughout with elements of house and tech house that go along with Cadence's autobiographical lyrics about inter-personal relationships in his hometown of Edmonton and the youth culture interacting with both the Internet and media in general. The album received a positive reception from critics, praising it for its experimentation of electronic music and its self-deprecating lyrics with pop culture references. To promote the record, Cadence toured across North America and Europe with appearances at music festivals.

== Background ==
Cadence Weapon released his debut album Breaking Kayfabe on November 28, 2005. It received a positive reception from critics upon release and was shortlisted for the 2006 Polaris Music Prize. In February 2007, Cadence signed with Anti-Records in hopes of gaining exposure in the United States. After that, he went back to his hometown of Edmonton to work on new material for his next album, while his debut effort was re-released by Anti- on March 13, 2007. The record was originally titled Scenery, but Cadence changed it to Afterparty Babies instead. Regarding the album's title, Cadence said that he got it from his father who occasionally called him that because he was "conceived" by his parents after going to a party.

The album cover features Cadence sitting front and center on a stool while behind him are a group of people set up like a high school class photo. Featured on the cover are people who worked on the record like DJ Weezl, DJ Nato, Nik Kozub of the dance-punk group Shout Out Out Out Out and several of Cadence's ex-girlfriends. The picture was taken in the basement of The Black Dog, a former pub in Edmonton.

== Music and lyrics ==
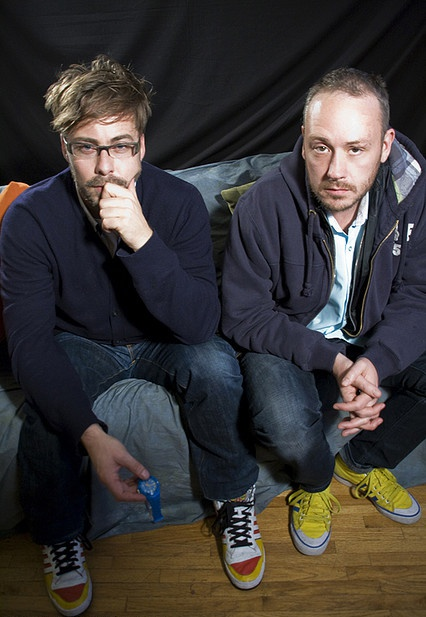
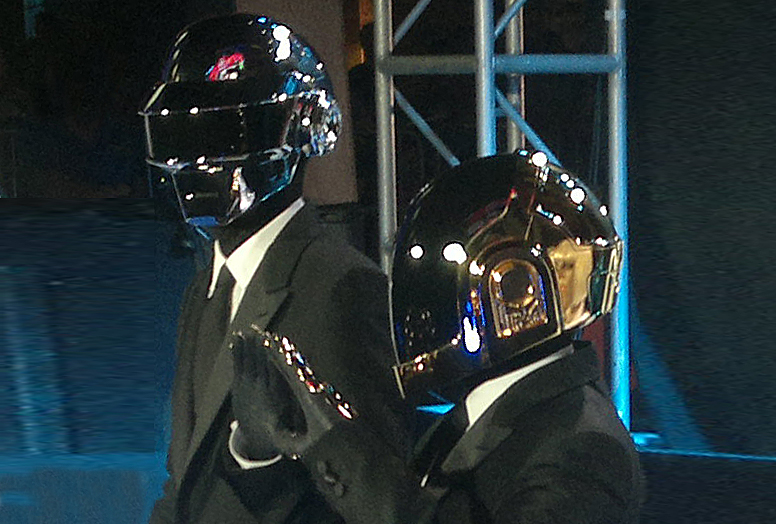
Cadence said that his use of the electronic genre in the album was influenced by artists like Basement Jaxx (left) and Daft Punk (right).

Afterparty Babies takes elements of house and tech house from the electronic genre for its overall sound. Cadence said that he was influenced by artists like Basement Jaxx and Daft Punk, and dance music in general when he found an interest in DJing that opened his mind to the genre as a whole: "I was getting more into DJing myself, listening to dance music, kind of realising that all music is inter-connected, everything is 4/4: you can mix everything together."

For the lyrical content, Cadence took inspiration from Bob Dylan records to tell stories that he drew from an experience he had in Edmonton during the summer of 2006. Another addition that Cadence put into the album was his view of the youth culture being more interested in using the Internet and media in general for their daily lives instead of living that experience in real life. Dan Raper of PopMatters described the point of view that Cadence took to deliver the lyrics as "a hyper self-aware, intelligent twenty-something outsider." The opener "Do I Miss My Friends?" is an a capella hip-hop track that uses a loop of Cadence doing hand claps, leg slapping and noises with his mouth. Cadence said in interviews that the track was inspired by both his fear of losing contact with his friends while on tour and his confusion of being with people he didn't know from the summer he spent saying, "What am I doing with these people? Why these people? Why are these people my friends?"

"Limited Edition OJ Slammer" was described by Cadence as being "the perfect metaphor for celebrity culture," saying that as a child he had a gold-plated razor blade pog slammer that showed O. J. Simpson and the phrase, "The Juice is Loose." Brian Howe of Pitchfork called the song "a diatribe against celebrity obsession." The overall sound of the track is from the glitch hop subgenre, done in the style of Prefuse 73. "Juliann Wilding" was based on a friend he met while working at See Magazine and called it his version of David Bowie's 1971 song "Queen Bitch". "Real Estate" was inspired by both Cadence's dad as a part-time real estate agent and the parallel between that career and battle rap; Cadence called it "a long extended metaphor about the rap industry and different areas of rap."

"Messages Matter" was described as a song where Cadence "comments on the state of [the] technology-driven social relationships and forms of communication that he sees replacing [the] human-to-human ones." One of the cuts the track uses comes from the 1989 Arnold Schwarzenegger film Kindergarten Cop in which he interrogates the children. Cadence said that DJ Weezl handled all the cuts heard throughout the album and was not involved in the process. He also said jokingly that because of this he might be "dead broke because of [Arnold] Schwarzenegger." "Tattoos (And What They Really Feel Like)" has Cadence switching from the overall theme of the song's title into a conversation with a tattoo artist about his personal life that's described as "a self-analysis of sensitivity and failed relationships." The track utilizes sounds from the IDM genre that's reminiscent of Autechre. "The New Face of Fashion" is a "nasty electro banger with funk accents" and "old-school tinged refrains" that's described as "a screed against trendy couture" that ironically complements the "Misshapes/Nudie Jeans/Diesel-wearing crowd mercilessly."

== Promotion ==
Cadence promoted the record by co-headlining a tour with fellow Canadian indie rock band Born Ruffians in the U.S. He followed that up with a 29-city spring-summer tour across the UK and Europe with several festival appearances at Glastonbury, Roskilde and Lollapalooza. He then went on a 13-city fall cross Canada tour, beginning with Vancouver's Richards On Richards and finishing at Fredericton's The Phoenix.

== Critical reception ==
Professional ratings
Aggregate scores
Source	Rating
Metacritic	73/100
Review scores
Source	Rating
AllMusic	4/5 stars
The A.V. Club	B
Drowned in Sound	9/10
The Guardian	4/5 stars
LAS Magazine	4.4/10
NOW	1/5 Ns
Paste	Favourable
Pitchfork	7.0/10
PopMatters	6/10 stars
Spin	6/10 stars

Afterparty Babies received generally favourable reviews from music critics. At Metacritic, which assigns a normalized rating out of 100 to reviews from mainstream critics, the album received an average score of 73, based on 20 reviews.

Marisa Brown of AllMusic praised the album for its production and Cadence's tongue-in-cheek lyrics, calling it "hipster rap that isn't trying to hard to be hip", concluding by saying it's "an album that accepts its imperfections as a part of its charm, and, all things considered, a pretty irresistible release." Dorian Lynskey of The Guardian also applauded Cadence for his subject matter saying, "Pemberton doesn't strain to impress. He doesn't need to: his darting intelligence and racing imagination are evident in every line." Sean O'Neal of The A.V. Club called the album an improvement over Breaking Kayfabe, praising its storytelling and pop culture references saying, "Throughout, Pemberton comes off like a clever friend who just happens to be lyrically gifted: [He's] the perfect hip-hop hero for the Myspace age."

Jon Pareles of The New York Times gave the album a favourable review, admiring Cadence's lyrical mocking and use of sound saying, "He backs up his insolence with dense, tricky productions that pile samples and scratching atop techno and electro beats and go increasingly haywire as he gets more worked up." Pitchfork writer Brian Howe commented about the overall growth in Cadence's musicianship throughout the record: "Aggressive mechanical drum patterns, gnarly electro synths, oddball samples, rubbery vocal cadences, pop-cultural punch lines, honor-roll puns: All of these comprise the broad strokes of Rollie Pemberton's musical identity, and now, on Afterparty Babies, they feel like the fixed elements of a mature style."

The record did receive some mixed reception. Dan Raper of PopMatters repeated what everyone said about the production and the lyrics throughout but felt that it limited Cadence's public appeal, concluding with, "You get the feeling he wouldn't want to be one of the "rappers on the radio" anyway." Josh Modell of Spin also voiced concerns about the album, feeling that Cadence takes too much from indie hip-hop and that he should be more of an "equally passionate goofball" that might put him into the mainstream. Writing for LAS Magazine, Dan Weiss felt that Cadence's vision throughout the album was muddled with mismatched production and off-kilter lyrics. Tim Perlich of NOW heavily criticized the album, saying that "[T]he boring beats and throwback rhyme flow (circa 92) – which is weak even by Edmontonian standards – put Afterparty Babies somewhere beneath Don Cash's home demos and the outtakes from Organized Rhyme's Huh? Stiffenin' Against The Wall."

On June 12, 2008, Afterparty Babies was longlisted for the 2008 Polaris Music Prize, but didn't make the final shortlist. In 2023, Complex added the album in its list of 10 Essential Canadian Albums of the Blog Era. The website's writer Darcy MacDonald said that the record "made clear that Cadence Weapon's experimentations bringing electronic elements back to hip-hop hadn't been a lark", noting the production "leaned further into the dancefloor-ready influence of superstars like Daft Punk and underground darlings like Prefuse 73." He concluded that: "As such, Cadence Weapon entered the conversation on rap blogs and indie rock sites alike, and he has remained as prolific, innovative and entertaining ever since."

== Track listing ==
No.	Title	Length
1.	"Do I Miss My Friends?"	5:11
2.	"In Search of the Youth Crew"	4:13
3.	"True Story"	3:34
4.	"Limited Edition OJ Slammer"	3:52
5.	"Juliann Wilding"	3:43
6.	"Real Estate"	3:42
7.	"Messages Matter"	3:44
8.	"Your Hair's Not Clothes!"	3:29
9.	"Tattoos (And What They Really Feel Like)"	3:30
10.	"The New Face of Fashion"	3:28
11.	"Getting Dumb"	4:38
12.	"House Music"	5:37
13.	"Unsuccessful Club Nights"	3:54
14.	"We Move Away"	5:05

== Personnel ==
Adapted from the liner notes of Afterparty Babies.

- Cadence Weapon: producer
- DJ Nato: co-producer (Track 1), producer (Track 8)
- DJ Weezl: cuts
- Nik Kozub: mixing (Zonik Studios in June 2007)
- Geoff Pesche: mastering (Abbey Road Studios in July 2007)
- Sherri Barclay and her mom: Interlude 1
- DJ Nato: Interlude 2
- Aaron Pedersen: photography
- Parasha Rachinsky: CD artwork
- Simon Evers: layout

== Release history ==
Region	Date	Format	Label	Ref.
Canada, United States	March 4, 2008	CD, digital download	Upper Class Recordings, Anti-	
United Kingdom	March 10, 2008	CD, digital download	Big Dada	
