= Hope in Dirt City =

Studio album by Cadence Weapon
- Released: May 29, 2012
- Genre: Alternative hip-hop
- Length: 38:13
- Label: Upper Class Recordings
- Producer: Cadence Weapon

Cadence Weapon chronology
Afterparty Babies (2008)	Hope in Dirt City (2012)	Cadence Weapon (2018)

Hope in Dirt City is the third album by Canadian rapper Cadence Weapon. It was released on May 29, 2012, on Upper Class Recordings.

== Release ==
The music video for the first single "Conditioning" was released in April 2012.

The whole album can be streamed on the Exclaim! website since May 22, 2012.

== Reception ==
Professional ratings
Review scores
Source	Rating
AllMusic	4/5 stars
Consequence of Sound	3/5 stars
Pitchfork	6.0/10.0
Prefix	favorable
Tiny Mix Tapes	3/5 stars
Toronto Star	3/4 stars

The album was named as a shortlisted nominee for the 2012 Polaris Music Prize, the second time a Cadence Weapon album has been on the Polaris shortlist. He was previously nominated in 2006 for his debut album Breaking Kayfabe.

== Track listing ==
No.	Title	Length
1.	"Get on Down"	1:59
2.	"Conditioning"	2:59
3.	"Jukebox"	2:52
4.	"Cheval"	2:27
5.	"(You Can't Stop) The Machine" (featuring Buck 65)	3:19
6.	"No More Names (Aditi)"	3:37
7.	"Small Deaths"	2:54
8.	"Hype Man"	3:55
9.	"There We Go"	5:28
10.	"Crash Course for the Ravers"	4:21
11.	"Hope in Dirt City"	4:22
