= Conquest (Dragon Fli Empire album) =

Studio album by Dragon Fli Empire
- Released: 2004
- Genre: Canadian hip hop
- Length: 53:00
- Label: Makebelieve Records

Dragon Fli Empire chronology
Conquest (2004)	Invasion (2005)

Professional ratings
Review scores
Source	Rating
Exclaim!	4/5 stars

Conquest is the first album by the Canadian hip hop duo Dragon Fli Empire, released in 2004 on Makebelieve Records. Although the 2004 release is officially considered DFE's first album, there was a locally circulated CD-R version released in June 2002. The 2004 version replaced three tracks from the CD-R version with new ones: "D-E-F", "From Under" and "Beauty Full 2.0". The album is most notable for the popular track "Mount Pleasant", a song about Teekay's observations while riding Calgary Transit.

== Music video ==
Only one video was made for the album. "Beauty Full" was filmed around Calgary in late 2002 and cameos are made by several emcees in Alberta's underground hip hop community.

== Track listing ==
#	Title	Producer	Featured guest(s)	Time
1	"Empire"	Teekay		1:05
2	"Beauty Full"	DJ Cosm		4:36
3	"D-E-F"	DFE		4:11
4	"4U"	Infinite P	Infinite P	4:16
5	"All That"	DJ Cosm	Curtis Santiago	4:10
6	"Thoughtful Poet"	DJ Cosm	Lingo	3:54
7	"Mount Pleasant"	DFE		4:19
8	"Speak to Me"	Teekay		4:11
9	"From Under"	DJ Nato	Chris Plus, Shortop	4:07
10	"Language of Music"	DFE	Curtis Santiago	4:31
11	"Beauty Full 2.0"	Teekay, Ohmega Watts	Ohmega Watts	5:12
12	"Tower of Babel"	DJ Cosm		3:54
13	"Conquest/Encore!"	DJ Grub/Teekay		8:34
