= Intermission EP =

EP by Dragon Fli Empire
- Released: 2008
- Genre: Canadian hip hop
- Length: 26:51
- Label: Makebelieve Records
- Producer: DJ Cosm; Metawon; Moka Only; Nohow; Teekay

Dragon Fli Empire chronology
Invasion (2005)	Intermission EP (2008)	Redefine (2009)

Professional ratings
Review scores
Source	Rating
Exclaim!	4/5 stars
Herohill.com	favorable link
Okayplayer	7.6/10
RapReviews	8/10

Intermission EP is a "between albums" disc by Canadian hip hop duo Dragon Fli Empire, released in 2008 on Makebelieve Records. As the first offering of new music from the group since 2005, the EP was designed to renew interest in the group before the release of their third full-length album Redefine. It proved to very popular on Canadian campus radio, reaching number three on the Earshot and Chart Attack hip hop charts. Two tracks from Intermission were nominated for Radio 3's 2008 Bucky Awards—"CGY" for Most Canadian Song and "Outside Inn" (featuring Cadence Weapon) for Best Collaboration. DFE used outside production from Moka Only, Nohow and Metawon on the EP.

== Track listing ==
#	Title	Producer	Featured guest(s)	Time
1	"Hi-Fli"	Teekay		3:43
2	"Outside Inn"	DJ Cosm	Cadence Weapon, Lynn Olagundoye	3:27
3	"CGY"	DJ Cosm		2:50
4	"Day Job"	Moka Only		2:39
5	"Headphones Remix"	Metawon	Touch	2:56
6	"Identiteye"	Nohow	Black Rose	3:05
7	"Stay the Course"	DJ Cosm		4:00
8	"Headphones Dub"	DJ Cosm		4:11
