= Invasion (Dragon Fli Empire album) =

Studio album by Dragon Fli Empire
- Released: 2005
- Genre: Canadian hip hop
- Length: 68:31
- Label: Makebelieve Records

Dragon Fli Empire chronology
Conquest (2004)	Invasion (2005)	Intermission EP (2008)

Professional ratings
Review scores
Source	Rating
Exclaim!	4/5 stars

Invasion is the second album by Canadian hip hop duo Dragon Fli Empire, released in 2005 on Makebelieve Records. It was viewed as a progression in the duo's sound and features guest artists from Calgary, Edmonton, Vancouver, Toronto, Tacoma and Portland. Several tracks were included in different CD compilations. The track "Roc the Crowd" (featuring and produced by Ohmega Watts) was released as a 12" vinyl single on Bigfoot Records in 2007.

== Music video ==
A video for the track "Our Way" was directed by Ramin Eshraghi-Yazdi, featuring the Calgary breakdancing crew Original Rudes.

== Track listing ==
#	Title	Producer	Featured guest(s)	Time
1	"Plan of Attack"	DJ Cosm		1:23
2	"Freshman"	DJ Cosm		4:10
3	"Three"	Teekay	Ndidi Cascade, More Or Les	4:41
4	"Our Way"	DJ Cosm		3:34
5	"Soundtrack of My Life"	Teekay		4:32
6	"Tight Spot"	DJ Cosm	Mindbender	3:35
7	"She Got Soul"	Infinite P		3:26
8	"Headphones"	DJ Cosm		4:09
9	"The City"	DFE		3:35
10	"One Dollar"	DJ Cosm		4:20
11	"Roc the Crowd"	Ohmega Watts	Ohmega Watts	4:59
12	"Invasion"	DJ Nato	Touch, Chaz	4:18
13	"Everyday"	Nohow	Kirby Small	5:09
14	"Be Free"	DJ Cosm		3:27
15	"The Lion"	Teekay	sphere720, Tariq	2:12
16	"A Glass of Water"	DJ Cosm	Joel Pleasant	2:58
17	"Perspective"	DJ Grub	Epic	3:21
18	"Mount Pleasant Remix"	Teekay	Belo, Shortop	4:53

(Note: Tracks 16–18 are listed as FAS Krew Bonus Kuts)
