= Dragon Fli Empire =

Canadian hip hop duo

- from left to right: DJ Cosm and Teekay.

Background information
- Origin: Calgary, Alberta, Canada
- Genres: Canadian hip hop
- Years active: 2002–present
- Labels: Makebelieve Records; P-Vine (Japan); Traveller Records; Bigfoot Records
- Members: Teekay; DJ Cosm
- Website: dragonfliempire.com

Dragon Fli Empire (abbreviated DFE) is a Canadian hip hop duo formed in 2002 from Calgary, comprising Tarik Robinson, also known as Teekay (MC/producer), and Adam Hicks, also known as DJ Cosm (DJ/producer).

DFE's first album, Conquest, was released in August 2004. It was followed by Invasion in 2005, Intermission EP in 2008 and Redefine in 2009. Their music is inspired by classic hip hop beats like those of Pete Rock, Large Professor and Prince Paul.

== History ==
Dragon Fli Empire formed in May 2002. They released the original version of their debut album Conquest locally in the summer of 2002 as a limited edition CD-R.

The song "Mount Pleasant", a track about observations while riding Calgary Transit received airplay on CJSW-FM, CKUA and CBC Radio 3. An official version of Conquest was pressed and independently released in August 2004. The album was re-mastered and three tracks from the CD-R version were replaced with newer ones, including the DFE theme song "D-E-F".

Their second album, Invasion, was independently released in May 2005. Reaching number five on the !earshot Canadian campus radio charts, it showcased a progression in the group's sound, and featured the tracks "Headphones", "Our Way", "Invasion" and "Tight Spot". The group collaborated with several other Canadian indie hip hop artists on the album, including Ndidi Cascade, More or Les, Epic, Mindbender and Touch and Nato plus live musicians like Kirby Small and Tariq.

In 2007, an album featuring tracks from Invasion and Conquest (Inquest) was released in Japan through P-Vine Records. The same year, a 12" vinyl release of the Invasion song "Roc the Crowd" featuring Ohmega Watts was released worldwide on Calgary-based label Bigfoot Records.

DFE released an EP entitled Intermission in May 2008 prior to their third full-length album Redefine. The EP reached number three on the !earshot and Chart Attack hip hop charts. Intermission also reached number three on The R3-30 on CBC Radio 3. Two tracks from Intermission were nominated for Radio 3's 2008 Bucky Awards.

The group's third full-length album, Redefine released in Japan on P-Vine Records in October 2008 and in North America on Makebelieve Records in January 2009. Redefine featured collaborations with a number of high-profile artists including Cadence Weapon, Masta Ace, Ohmega Watts, Josh Martinez, Moka Only and Raashan Ahmad. It reached number one for two weeks on the !earshot and Chart Attack hip hop charts, and was number three for several weeks on the CMJ hip hop charts. The video for "Outside Inn" was the group's first to receive rotation on MuchMusic and MuchVibe. Redefine was also nominated for Best Rap / Hip Hop Recording at the 2009 Western Canadian Music Awards.

The Ride On EP vinyl was released via Finnish label Traveller Records in September 2009, featuring four songs from Redefine.

Dragon Fli Empire was the first hip hop group featured on the annual MUCH does Calgary talent showcase on MuchMusic in 2005. They have also appeared on CBC-TV's ZeD and The National. The group has toured across Canada, Europe and parts of the U.S., and played festivals like Shambhala, Montreal's Under Pressure, Ottawa's Alberta Scene and Yellowknife's Folk on the Rocks. DFE has also played select dates of Warped Tour and Rock the Bells as well as showcasing locally at JunoFest, Sled Island, the Calgary International Spoken Word Festival and the Calgary Folk Music Festival.

Their music has been featured on the MTV Canada series Peak Season as well as the OLN/National Geographic Adventure travel show Word Travels.

== Discography ==
- Conquest - 2004 - Makebelieve Records
- Invasion - 2005 - Makebelieve Records
- Intermission EP - 2008 - Makebelieve Records
- Redefine - 2009 - Makebelieve Records
- Mission Statement - 2013 - Makebelieve Records
- Banff Avenue - 2020 - Makebelieve Records

== Japanese discography ==
- Inquest - 2007 - P-Vine Records
- Redefine - 2008 - P-Vine Records

== Vinyl discography ==
- Abstrakt Vinyl Compilation - 2005 - Makebelieve Records (features "Headphones")
- Roc the Crowd EP feat. Ohmega Watts - 2007 - Bigfoot Records
- Ride On EP - 2009 - Traveller Records
- Hold Down the Fort b/w Right on Time ft. Von Pea 7" - 2018 - Beats House Records / Radio Krimi Records
- Record Store ft. J-Live b/w Fli Beat Patrol 7" - 2020 - Ill Adrenaline Records

== Compilation appearances ==
- New Music Canada, Vol. 1 (2004, CBC Records) - "Mount Pleasant"
- Up North Trip Vol. 4 (2006, Audio Research Records) - "Invasion"
- Underground Hip Hop Vol. 4 (2006, URBNET Records) - "Tight Spot"
- Mellow Beats, Rhymes and Vibes (2007, P-Vine Records) - "Beauty Full"
- Beat Studies: Lesson Two (2008, P-Vine Records) - "Headphones"
- Mellow Beats, Sunshine and Twilight (2009, P-Vine Records) - "Paradise", "Speak to Me"
- Underground Hip Hop Vol. 5 (2010, URBNET Records) - "Rise"
