= I'm Dreaming =

I'm Dreaming may refer to:

- I'm Dreaming (album), a 2018 album by Australian electronic musician Alice Ivy
- I'm Dreamin', 1991 number-one R&B single by Christopher Williams
