= Upper Class Recordings =

Record label

- Founded: 2005
- Founder: Orly Bohbot
- Distributor: Universal Music Canada RedEye Distribution EMI Music Canada
- Genre: indie pop, hip hop music, dance music
- Country of origin: Canada
- Location: Toronto, Ontario, Canada
- Official website: http://www.upperclassrecordings.com

Upper Class Recordings is a Canadian independent record label founded in 2000 in Toronto, Ontario and focusing on electronic music. Its roster includes The Russian Futurists, Cadence Weapon, DVAS, Christien Summers and The Cansecos.

== History ==
Upper Class Records was founded in 2000. Its first album release was the debut LP by The Russian Futurists, 'The Method Of Modern Love'. The label later formalized as Upper Class Recordings. It has released four albums by The Russian Futurists, two albums each by The Cansecos and Cadence Weapon, and one album by both girlsareshort (a solo project by musician Al-P from MSTRKRFT) and Food For Animals.

In 2006 Upper Class began a distribution partnership with EMI Music Canada.

In 2010, Nettwerk One Music, the publishing arm of Vancouver's Nettwerk Music Group, announced that it was representing the publishing works of Upper Class Recordings worldwide.

In 2016, Kobalt Music Publishing began representing Upper Class Recordings worldwide.

The label has become synonymous with Canadian electronic music. Per Lost At Sea Magazine, the label "has struck gold [... it] seems to produce blissed-out electronic pop masterpieces like an assembly line"

Upper Class Recordings, through licensing partnerships, has seen its releases picked up by Anti-/Epitaph Records, Ninja Tune/Big Dada Recordings, Memphis Industries, and Cooperative Music.

== Discography ==
- UC001 - Various Artists - The Manhattan Collection
- UC002 - The Russian Futurists - Ecole de Neige EP
- UC003 - The Russian Futurists - The Method of Modern Love
- UC004 - The Russian Futurists - Let's Get Ready to Crumble
- UC005 - The Cansecos - The Cansecos
- UC006 - Girlsareshort - Early North American
- UC007 - Various Artists - We Owe You Nothing
- UC008 - Food For Animals - Scavengers
- UC009 - The Russian Futurists - Our Thickness
- UC010 - Cadence Weapon - Breaking Kayfabe
- UC011 - The Russian Futurists - Me, Myself and Rye
- UC012 - The Cansecos - Juices!
- UC013 - Cadence Weapon - Afterparty Babies
- UC014 - DVAS - Society
- UC015 - The Russian Futurists - The Weight's on the Wheels
- UC016 - Cadence Weapon - Hope In Dirt City
- UC020 - The Russian Futurists - Reality Burger with a side of life EP
