= Redefine =

Redefine may refer to:

- Redefine (Soil album), 2004
- Redefine (Dragon Fli Empire album), 2009
- Redefine (magazine), an independent music and art magazine from the United States
- "Redefine", a 2002 rap song by Mars Ill
- "Redefine", a song by the American band Bright from their self-titled album
- "Redefine", a song by Incubus from S.C.I.E.N.C.E.

== See also ==
- Redefin
- "Redefinition", an episode of the television show Angel
