= Porcella =

Studio album by The Deadly Snakes
- Released: 2005
- Genre: Rock
- Length: 39:10
- Label: Paper Bag Records

The Deadly Snakes chronology
Ode to Joy (2003)	Porcella (2005)

Professional ratings
Review scores
Source	Rating
Allmusic	link
Dusted Magazine	favorable link
Pitchfork Media	8.1/10 link
PopMatters	9/10 link
Spectrum Culture	link
Splendid Magazine	favorable link
Stylus Magazine	B link

Porcella is an album by Canadian indie rock band The Deadly Snakes, released in 2005 on In the Red Records and licensed for Canadian distribution by Paper Bag Records.

The album's single "Gore Veil" was named one of the ten best Canadian songs of 2005 by CBC Radio 3. The album was also subsequently shortlisted for the 2006 Polaris Music Prize. It was, however, the band's final album.

In interviews around the time of the band's breakup in 2006, keyboardist Max "Age of Danger" McCabe-Lokos described Porcella's creative process as a difficult one, marked by creative tension between him and bandleader André Ethier. Ethier had released a solo album in 2004, and McCabe-Lokos admitted that his own response to that was to assert greater creative control over Porcella than he had on past Snakes albums, taking on both production and mixing duties.

A vinyl-only reissue of the album was released in 2006, with an altered track order and seven new songs not on the original release.

== Track listing ==
1. "Debt Collection" – 3:01
2. "200 Nautical Miles" – 2:16
3. "Sissy Blues" – 2:09
4. "High Prices Going Down" – 2:47
5. "Gore Veil" – 4:34
6. "So Young & So Cruel" – 3:25
7. "Let It All Go" – 2:57
8. "Work" – 3:32
9. "Oh Lord, My Heart" – 3:13
10. "I Heard Your Voice" – 3:29
11. "By Morning, It's Gone" – 1:54
12. "Banquet" – 2:42
13. "A Bird in the Hand Is Worthless" – 3:11

Porcella - A Bird in the Hand is Worthless (Double LP - vinyl only/alternate artwork)

1. "Debt Collection" – 3:01
2. "Sissy Blues" – 2:09
3. "High Prices Going Down" – 2:47
4. "Oh Lord, My Heart" – 3:13
5. "Ambulance Man" - 4:19
6. "She's Going Home With Him" - 2:58
7. "Break Up Conversation" - 3:27
8. "Bound To Get Lonely" - 2:45
9. "By Morning, It's Gone" – 1:54
10. "Veronica Brown" - 4:41
11. "I Heard Your Voice" – 3:29
12. "Don River Jail" - 2:19
13. "Let It All Go" – 2:57
14. "A Bird in the Hand Is Worthless" – 3:11
15. "No Sympathy" - 4:15
16. "Gore Veil" – 4:34
17. "So Young & So Cruel" – 3:25
18. "Work" – 3:32
19. "200 Nautical Miles" – 2:16
20. "Banquet" – 2:42
