= Ode to Joy (The Deadly Snakes album) =

Studio album by The Deadly Snakes
- Released: April 15, 2003
- Recorded: 2002
- Genres: Garage punk, punk blues
- Length: 39:10
- Label: In the Red

The Deadly Snakes chronology
| I'm Not Your Soldier Anymore (2001) | Ode to Joy (2003) | Porcella (2005) |

Professional ratings
Review scores
| Source | Rating |
|---|---|
| AllMusic | 4.5/5 stars |
| Exclaim! | |
| Pitchfork Media | 8.5 |
| PopMatters | Favorable |
| Tiny Mix Tapes | 4.5/5 stars |
| Uncut | 3/10 |

Ode to Joy is an album by Canadian indie rock band The Deadly Snakes, released in 2003 on In the Red Records.

== Track listing ==
| No. | Title | Length |
|---|---|---|
| 1. | "Closed Casket" (The Deadly Snakes, André Ethier) | 3:03 |
| 2. | "I Can't Sleep at Night" (Age of Danger, Matt Carlson, The Deadly Snakes) | 2:47 |
| 3. | "Playboys" (The Deadly Snakes, Ethier) | 2:47 |
| 4. | "Oh My Bride" (The Deadly Snakes, Ethier, Andrew Gunn) | 2:16 |
| 5. | "Trouble's Gonna Stay Awhile" (Carlson, Ethier, The Deadly Snakes) | 3:06 |
| 6. | "I Want to Die" (Age Of Danger, The Deadly Snakes) | 4:05 |
| 7. | "Burn Down the Valley" (Age Of Danger, The Deadly Snakes) | 2:40 |
| 8. | "Nick and Chico" (The Deadly Snakes, Ross) | 0:37 |
| 9. | "I'm Leaving You" (Age Of Danger, The Deadly Snakes) | 3:37 |
| 10. | "There Goes Your Corpse Again" (The Deadly Snakes, Ethier) | 4:03 |
| 11. | "Everybody Seems to Think (You've Got Some Kind of Hold on Me)" (The Deadly Snakes, Ethier) | 3:32 |
| 12. | "Sink Like Stones" (The Deadly Snakes, Ethier) | 4:34 |
| 13. | "Mutiny and Lonesome Blues" (The Deadly Snakes, Ethier) | 1:53 |

== Personnel ==
- Matt "Dog" Carlson - trumpet, harmonica, bass, guitar, vocals
- André Ethier - vocals, guitar
- Max "Age of Danger" McCabe-Lokos - piano, organ, vocals, percussion
- Greg Cartwright - vocals, guitar
- Andrew Gunn - drums
- Jeremy Madsen - saxophone
- Yuri Didrichsons - bass, guitar
- David Cheppa - mastering
- Peter Hudson - engineer, slide guitar
