= Ode to Joy (disambiguation) =

"Ode to Joy" is a poem by Friedrich Schiller.

Ode to Joy may also refer to:

- The "Ode to Joy" theme from Ludwig van Beethoven's 9th Symphony, the best known setting of the poem
  - Ode to Joy, the name of the Anthem of Europe, based on Beethoven's work
- Ode to Joy (The Deadly Snakes album), by the Canadian indie rock band The Deadly Snakes
- Ode to Joy (Wilco album), a 2019 album by the American alternative rock band Wilco
- "Ode to Joy", episode title of the series finale of Beverly Hills, 90210
- Ode to Joy (TV series), a 2016 Chinese TV series
- Ode to Joy (film), a 2019 American romantic comedy

== See also ==
- To Joy (film), 1950 film by Ingmar Bergman
- "The Hymn of Joy", a popular Christian hymn sung to Beethoven's melody
