= Redefine (Dragon Fli Empire album) =

Studio album by Dragon Fli Empire
- Released: 2009
- Genre: Canadian hip hop
- Length: 43:31
- Label: Makebelieve Records
- Producer: DJ Cosm; Dark Eyed Junco; The Gaff; Metawon; Moka Only; DJ Nato; Teekay

Dragon Fli Empire chronology
Intermission EP (2008)	Redefine (2009)	Mission Statement (2013)

Professional ratings
Review scores
Source	Rating
AbortMag	(favorable)
CD Baby	5/5 stars
Exclaim!	(favorable)
Herohill.com	(favorable)
PopMatters	7/10 stars

Redefine is the third full-length album by Canadian hip hop duo Dragon Fli Empire, released in North America on Makebelieve Records in early 2009. Teekay has explained the album title by saying: "We 'redefine' by using our creativity to bust free from any boxes placed on what we can accomplish."

It features collaborations with a number of high-profile artists including Cadence Weapon, Masta Ace, Ohmega Watts, Josh Martinez, Moka Only and Raashan Ahmad and managed to reach number one for two weeks on the !earshot and Chart Attack hip hop charts, plus number three for several weeks on the U.S.-based CMJ hip hop charts. The album was nominated for Best Rap / Hip Hop Recording at the 2009 Western Canadian Music Awards.

== Music videos ==
A video for "Outside Inn" (ft. Cadence Weapon) was directed by Ramin Eshraghi-Yazdi and released in late 2008. It became the group's first music video to receive airplay on MuchMusic and MuchVibe. In 2009, two more videos directed by Wal Martian for "Keep the Funk Alive" and "Paradise” (ft. Moka Only) were released exclusively online.

== Track listing ==
#	Title	Producer	Featured guest(s)	Time
1	"Fastbreak"	DJ Cosm		2:00
2	"Just That Nice"	Dark Eyed Junco		3:15
3	"Ride On"	DJ Cosm	Raashan Ahmad	2:52
4	"Keep the Funk Alive"	Moka Only		2:10
5	"Redefine"	The Gaff		3:20
6	"Outside Inn"	DJ Cosm	Cadence Weapon, Lynn Olagundoye	3:23
7	"Paradise"	DJ Cosm	Moka Only	3:30
8	"Spanish Story"	Teekay		3:03
9	"Xoxo"	DJ Cosm		2:53
10	"Floor to the Roof"	DJ Cosm, Metawon	Velben	4:11
11	"Watch Ya' Front"	DJ Nato	Josh Martinez	3:50
12	"Rise"	DJ Cosm	Masta Ace	3:31
13	"To the Sky"	DJ Cosm	Velben, Ohmega Watts	4:05
14	"Peace"			1:28
