= The Find =

Studio album by Ohmega Watts
- Released: September 13, 2005
- Genre: Hip hop, soul, funk
- Label: Ubiquity Records

Ohmega Watts chronology
The Find (2005)	Watts Happening (2007)

Professional ratings
Review scores
Source	Rating
Allmusic	4/5 stars
Okayplayer	4.5/5 stars

The Find is the first full-length album by hip hop artist Ohmega Watts. It was released in 2005 on Ubiquity Records.

== Track listing ==
1. "Introducing"
2. "Where It All Started" feat. DJ DNA
3. "That Sound" feat. Lightheaded, The Procussions, & Noell
4. "You Are Now Tuned In" feat. Adam L & DJ Bombay
5. "Journey (Interlude 1)"
6. "Full Swing" feat. Neogen & Deacon
7. "A Request"
8. "Mind Power"
9. "Your Love" feat. Tiffany Simpson
10. "Treasure Hunt" feat. Sugar Candy
11. "Groovin' on Sunshine"
12. "At the Oasis (Interlude 2)"
13. "The Find" feat. Stro The 89th Key (of The Procussions)
14. "Saturday Night Live (Perfect Strangers No. 1)" feat. Surreal & Sharlok Poems
15. "The Harder They Come (Interlude 3)"
16. "The Treatment" feat. Manchild, Braille, & Big Rec
17. "Stay Tuned" feat. Sojourn
18. "Ya'll There? (Interlude 4)"
19. "Floor Rock"
20. "Move!"
21. "Long Ago" feat. Othello
22. "Dream On (Outro)"
