= DVAS =

Canadian musical group

- Also known as: Dietzche V & the Abominable Snowman
- Origin: Toronto, Ontario, Canada
- Genres: Club; Disco; Hi-NRG; Visual
- Years active: 2003–2011
- Label: Upper Class
- Members: Darren Veres; Jered Stuffco; Dean Wales; Dan Carlyle
- Past members: Jordan Stuffco
- Website: dvasmusique.com

DVAS (Dietzche V. & the Abominable Snowman) was a Canadian electronic dance music group formed in 2003 in Edmonton by Canadian musicians Jered Stuffco and Darren Veres.

The group played their final live show on July 17, 2011.

== Macho ==
- Macho documents the group from its very beginnings with a number of its singles and some new and some not widely available tracks.
- Michael Douglas was the muse for Black Rain, one of 10 tracks on their latest collection, Macho. (Douglas also starred in a 1991 crime film of the same name.) "The movie's great and Michael Douglas is an icon," smiles Darren Veres. "It's obviously a huge joke," adds Jered Stuffco.
- Recorded and mixed in Edmonton via computer—the disc required patience, humor and, above all, high-speed internet connections and trust. Some songs required two weeks of edits and dozens of e-mails between band mates.

== Mixtapes and remixes ==
- DVAS have released three Internet-only mixtapes, a slew of remixes, and the track "Inner Sanctum" featured on the 2009 France based blog turned label, Valerie: "Valerie And Friends" Compilation.

== Discography ==
- DVAS MACHO (2007, Pop Echo Records: CAN)
- Society (2010, Upper Class Recordings: CAN)
