= Bertie Blackman =

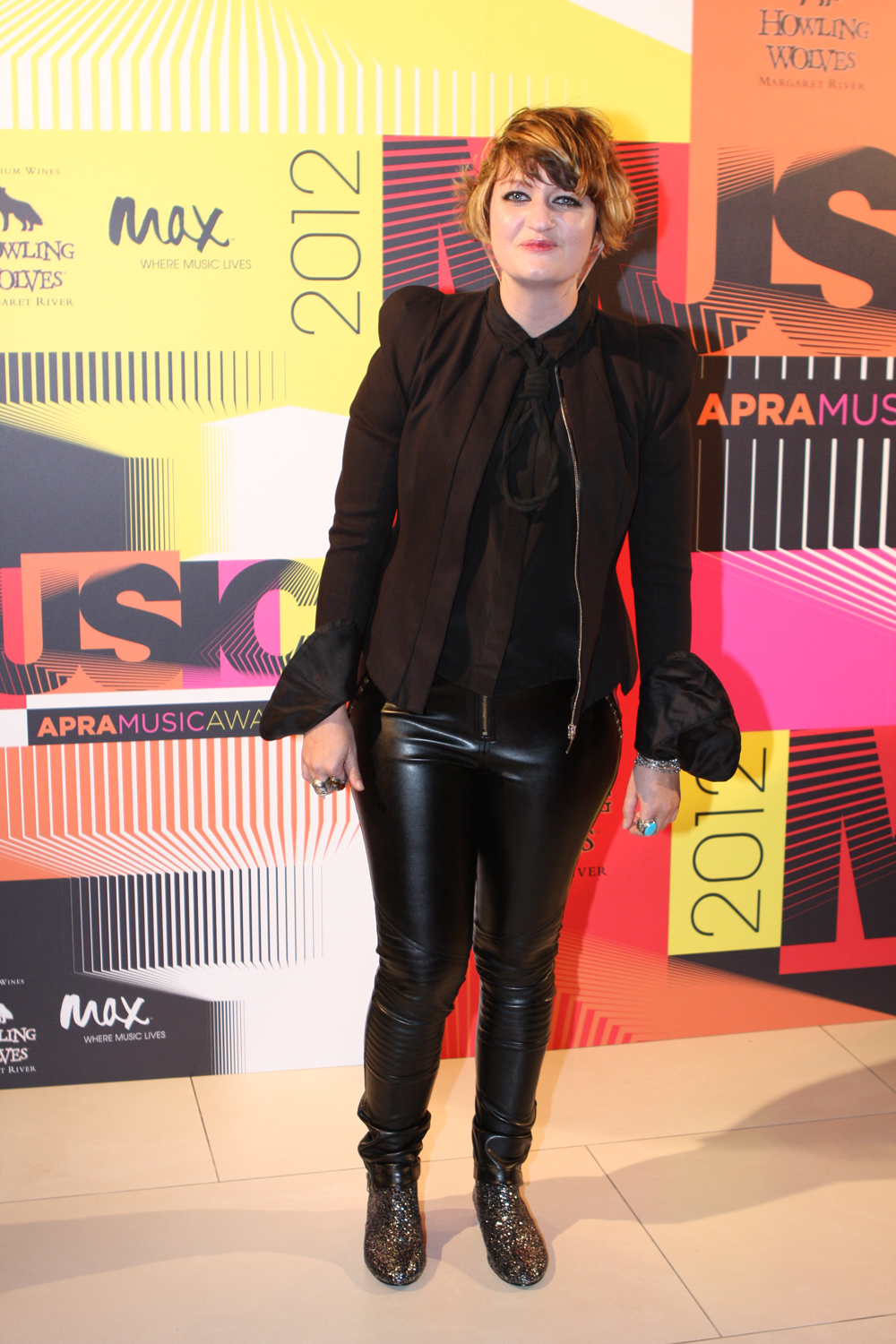
- Blackman at the 2012 APRA Music Awards

Background information
- Born: 1982 or 1983 (age 43–44)
- Origin: Sydney, Australia
- Genres: Indie rock; electronica; pop
- Occupations: Musician; singer-songwriter; producer
- Instruments: rhythm guitar; electric guitar; Vocals
- Years active: 2003–present
- Labels: Forum5; Mercury; Universal; Outpost; Warner
- Website: bertieblackman.com

Beatrice "Bertie" Blackman (born 1982 or 1983) is an Australian singer, songwriter and guitarist. She rose to fame in 2004 with her debut album Headway.

== Early life and education ==
Beatrice "Bertie" Blackman was born in 1982 or 1983 to parents who were visual artists, Genevieve and Charles Blackman. Their first family home was in the eastern Sydney suburb of Paddington Her parents divorced when she was four and she lived with her mother in Sydney, but saw her father frequently.

She attended International Grammar School in Ultimo. She began playing African percussion at the age of twelve and guitar at the age of fifteen.

== Career ==
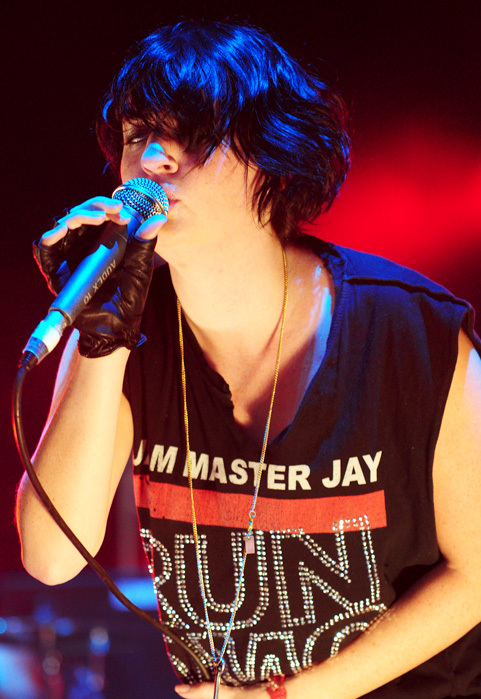
Blackman playing at the Parklife Music Festival (2009)

Blackman appeared on the Australian music scene in 2004 with the single "Favourite Jeans," taken from her debut album, Headway (2004), a folk-inspired acoustic album featuring musicians Cameron Deyell, Laurence Pike, and Cameron Undy, and was co-produced by Richard Belkner. This album established her as an Australian headliner alongside contemporaries Something for Kate, Ben Lee, and Alex Lloyd. She wrote music for Australian films, including the title track to the 2008 production Hey, Hey, It's Esther Blueburger which saw her collaborate with prodigious Australian producer Paul Mac.

After forming a new band with Neal Sutherland, Evan Mannell and Cameron Deyell, she made her second album Black (2006) and received positive reviews and high rotation on Triple J and demonstrated Blackman's move away from folk music to a focus on rock. This album was produced by Paul McKercher.

In 2008, Blackman signed with newly formed Australian management company Forum 5 and began working on her third studio album, Secrets and Lies, which was recorded between Sydney and Melbourne. Musicians involved included Neal Sutherland, Evan Mannell, and Ben Hauptmann, with producers Lee Groves and Francois Tetaz.

Her first single from the album, "Heart," was released on 10 April 2009. The song was added on high rotation on Australian radio station Triple J and nationwide on commercial radio network Nova as well as on regional and community stations across the country. Altogether, "Heart" was the 4th most added song on radio in the week of its release, and entered the Australian radio airplay charts at No. 67.

The album Secrets and Lies was the Triple J Feature Album for the week commencing 27 April 2009 Secrets and Lies entered the ARIA album charts at No. 72 and peaked at No. 49.

== Session and touring members ==
- Laurence Pike – drums, percussion, vibraphone (2004–05)
- Cameron Undy – electric bass, double bass, bass (2004–05)
- Cameron Deyell – lead guitar, electric guitar, guitar synthesizer, grand piano, wurlitzer organ (2004–07)
- Clayton Doley – hammond organ, wurlitzer organ (2004)
- Calvin Turner – bass (2005)
- Neal Sutherland – bass, keyboards, synthesizer (2005–09)
- Evan Mannell – drums (2005–09)
- Ben Hauptmann – string arrangement (2009)
- Andrew Hines (2009)
- Anthea Caddy (2009)
- Gareth Skinner (2009)
- James Ware (2009)
- Josie de Sousa (2009)
- Lewie Day (2009)
- Manny Bourakis (2009)
- Michael Iveson – drums, percussion, scissors, claps, toy drum kit, snare drum (2009–12)
- Rachel Easton (2009)
- Stephanie Zarka (2009)
- Tim Harvey (2009)
- Sam Lawrence (2009)
- François Tétaz – organ, piano, glockenspiel, tack piano, elka organ, violin, moog, xylophone, castanets, wurlitzer organ, drums, claps, percussion, steel drum, vibraphone, harp, strings, woodwind, synthesizer (2012)
- Luke Hodgson – bass, scissors, claps (2012)
- Ken Yuguchi – guitar, electric guitar (2012)
- Tom Spender – saxophone, alto saxophone, whistling, harmonica (2012)
- Adam Simmons – saxophone, tenor saxophone, baritone saxophone, soprano saxophone, bass clarinet, contralto clarinet (2012)
- Kram – acoustic guitar, guitar (2012)
- Sophia Brous – vocals (2012)
- Andy Stewart – guitar, difficult omnichord (2012)
- James Wilkinson – trombone, euphonium (2012)
- Kirk Pengilly – saxophone (2014)

== Awards and nominations ==
At the AIR Awards of 2009, Blackman received four nominations for 'Best Independent Single or EP', 'Breakthrough Independent Artist of the Year', 'Best Independent Album' and 'Best Independent Artist', winning 'Breakthrough Independent Artist of the Year'.

At the ARIA Music Awards of 2009, Blackman won the ARIA Award for Best Independent Release. In 2010, she released as a single a cover version of "Peek-a-Boo" from Siouxsie and the Banshees.

=== AIR Awards ===
The Australian Independent Record Awards (commonly known informally as AIR Awards) is an annual awards night to recognise, promote and celebrate the success of Australia's Independent Music sector.

Year	Nominee / work	Award	Result
2009	herself	Best Independent Artist	Nominated
2009	herself	Breakthrough Independent Artist	Won
2009	Secrets and Lies	Breakthrough Independent Album	Nominated
2009	"Heart"	Best Independent Single/EP	Nominated

=== ARIA Music Awards ===
The ARIA Music Awards is an annual awards ceremony held by the Australian Recording Industry Association.

Year	Nominee / work	Award	Result
2009	Secrets and Lies	Best Independent Release	Won

=== Australian Music Prize ===
The Australian Music Prize (the AMP) is an annual award of $30,000 given to an Australian band or solo artist in recognition of the merit of an album released during the year of award. The commenced in 2005.

Year	Nominee / work	Award	Result
2009	Secrets and Lies	Australian Music Prize	Nominated

=== J Award ===
The J Awards are an annual series of Australian music awards that were established by the Australian Broadcasting Corporation's youth-focused radio station Triple J. They commenced in 2005.

Year	Nominee / work	Award	Result
2009	Secrets and Lies	Australian Album of the Year	Nominated
2012	Pope Innocent X	Australian Album of the Year	Nominated
2012	"Boy"	Australian Video of the Year	Nominated

== Personal life ==
In 2022 she published a memoir, Bohemian Negligence.

== Discography ==
=== Studio albums ===
Title	Album details	Peak chart positions
Title	Album details	AUS
Headway	Released: 16 August 2004; Label: Bertie Blackman (BB3); Format: CD	—
Black	Released: 16 September 2006; Label: Bertie Blackman (BB7); Format: CD, digital download	—
Secrets and Lies	Released: 27 April 2009; Label: Forum 5 (F5-BB09); Format: CD, digital download	49
Pope Innocent X	Released: 12 October 2012; Label: Mercury, Universal; Format: CD, digital download	54
The Dash	Released: 31 October 2014; Label: Outpost, Warner; Format: CD, LP, digital download	—
"—" denotes a recording that did not chart or was not released in that territory.

=== Extended plays ===
Title	Album details
Blue Sky Pueblo	Released: November 2002; Label: Bertie Blackman (AU) (BB1); Format: CD
Town of Sky EP	Released: 18 March 2009; Label: EQ; Format: Digital download
The Remixes	Released: 5 July 2011 (AU); Label: Full Tilt; Format: Digital download

=== Remix albums ===
Title	Album details
B-Sides – Secrets and Lies Remixed	Released: 16 April 2010; Label: Forum 5; Format: Digital download

=== Singles ===
Title	Year	Peak chart positions		Album
Title	Year	AUS	JJJ 100	Album
"Criminal of Desire"	2003	—	—	Blue Sky Pueblo
"Favourite Jeans"	2004	—	—	Headway
"You Kill Me"	2005	—	—	Black
"Television"	2005	—	—	Black
"Hold Me Close"	2006	—	—	Black
"Fast Bitch"	2007	—	—	Black
"Heart"	2009	99	120	Secrets and Lies
"Thump"	2009	—	93	Secrets and Lies
"Byrds of Prey"	2009	—	71	Secrets and Lies
"Black Cats"	2009	—	184	Secrets and Lies
"Peek-a-Boo" (Siouxsie and the Banshees cover)	2010	92	171	—N/a
"Mercy Killer"	2012	—	—	Pope Innocent X
"Boy"	2012	—	—	Pope Innocent X
"Run for Your Life"	2014	—	—	The Dash
"Kingdom of Alone"	2014	—	—	The Dash
"—" denotes a recording that did not chart or was not released in that territory.

==== As featured artist ====
Title	Year	Peak chart positions	Album
Title	Year	AUS	Album
"Young & Dumb" (Chance Waters featuring Bertie Blackman)	2012	91	Infinity
"Karmageddon Undone" (Abbe May featuring Bertie Blackman)	2014	—	non-album single
"This Game" (Odd Mob featuring Bertie Blackman)	2015	—	Diverse Universe
"Long Loud Hours" (Urthboy featuring Bertie Blackman)	2015	95	The Past Beats Inside Me Like a Second Heartbeat

==== Promotional singles ====
Title	Year	Album
"War of One"	2014	The Dash

==== Guest appearances ====
List of guest appearances, with primary artist(s), year released, and album name shown
Title	Year	Album	Notes
"Don't You Ever" (The Tongue featuring Bertie Blackman)	2006	Bad Education	
"The Futurist" (Something for Kate featuring Bertie Blackman)	2007	The Murmur Years – The Best of Something for Kate 1996 – 2007	Backing vocals
"The Only One" (Paul Mac featuring Bertie Blackman)	2008	Hey Hey It's Esther Blueburger – Original Soundtrack	
"Town of Sorrow" (Mic Newman Remix)	2008	One Love – Mobile Disco 2009	
"In the Air Tonight" (Phil Collins cover)	2009	Triple J: Like a Version Five	
"Heart" (Live at The Hi-Fi Brisbane 14 August 2009)	2010	The Hi-Fi Live Highlights	
"Peekaboo" (Marco Del Horno Remix)	2010	Bullet Train Volume One	
"Gold Dust Woman" (Fleetwood Mac cover)	2011	When I First Met Your Ma	
"Do You Love Me?" (featuring Muscles; Nick Cave and the Bad Seeds cover)	2012	Straight to You – triple j's Tribute to Nick Cave	
"The Mercy Seat" (Nick Cave and the Bad Seeds cover)	2012	Straight to You – triple j's Tribute to Nick Cave	
"Chasing Stars" (Alice Ivy featuring Bertie Blackman)	2018	I'm Dreaming	Guest vocals
"Sweetest Love" (Alice Ivy featuring Montaigne and Bertie Blackman)	2020	Don't Sleep	Guest vocals
"Gold" Alice Ivy featuring Bertie Blackman)	2020	Don't Sleep	Guest vocals

=== Music videos ===
Title	Year	Director(s)
"Favourite Jeans"	2004	
"You Kill Me"	2005	Simon Wright
"Television"	2006	Clemens Habicht
"Fast Bitch"	2007	Beth Halon
"Thump" (Viral video)	2009	
"Heart"	2009	Danielle Zorbas
"Thump"	2009	Don Cameron
"Byrds of Prey"	2009	Marc Furmie
"Black Cats"	2010	Miland Suman and Richard Thomas
"Peek-a-Boo"	2010	Jonathon Lim and Andrew Smith
"Mercy Killer"	2012	Chino Moya
"Boy"	2012	Quan Yeomans
"Stella"	2012	Andrew Kavanagh
"Run for Your Life"	2014	Timothy Nash and Lucas Crandles
"Kingdom of Alone"	2014	Nick Waterman
"Strangers in a Moment"	2015	Radioactive Gigantism Films

==== As featured artist ====
Title	Year	Director(s)
"The Only One" (Paul Mac featuring Bertie Blackman)	2008	
"Young & Dumb" (Chance Waters featuring Bertie Blackman)	2012	Craig Foster
