= Andre Ethier (musician) =

Canadian musician (born 1977)

André Ethier (born 1977) is a Canadian rock singer-songwriter and visual artist who was formerly associated with the indie rock band The Deadly Snakes. He has also released numerous solo albums.

He attended Etobicoke School of the Arts for Visual Arts and received a BFA from Concordia University in 2001.

== Career ==
While with the Deadly Snakes, Ethier released his debut solo album André Ethier with Christopher Sandes featuring Pickles and Price in 2004. This was later cited by his bandmate Max "Age of Danger" McCabe-Lokos as having fomented creative tensions during the recording of the band's Polaris Music Prize-nominated 2005 album Porcella, and ultimately to the band's breakup.

Ethier's second solo album, Secondathallam, was released in 2006.

His song "Self-Love" was featured on the soundtrack to the 2007 film This Beautiful City. On June 10, 2007, Ethier sang "O Canada" in Los Angeles, where the Los Angeles Dodgers were hosting his hometown Toronto Blue Jays. He got the gig because he shares his name with Dodgers outfielder Andre Ethier.

Ethier followed up with the album On Blue Fog in 2007, and the sequel album Born of Blue Fog in 2008.

In 2011 he contributed to the National Parks Project, visiting Prince Albert National Park with Mathieu Charbonneau, Rebecca Foon and filmmaker Stéphane Lafleur to shoot and score a short documentary film about the park.

He concentrated primarily on art through the early 2010s, and did not release an album of new material until 2017's Under Grape Leaves. He followed up in 2019 with Croak in the Weeds, and in 2021 with Further Up Island.

== Art ==
Ethier paints portraits, figures and landscapes in oil, his work has been described as a grotesque realism and is influenced by neo-expressionism, primitive art, underground comic art and the works of Giuseppe Arcimboldo and Odilon Redon. He has had solo shows at Honor Fraser Gallery in Los Angeles, Greener Pastures Contemporary Art in Toronto, and Derek Eller Gallery in New York. He is represented by Derek Eller Gallery.

In The New York Times Ken Johnson wrote: "André Ethier's funny, faux-naïve paintings resemble the works of a self-taught, semi-talented high school stoner steeped in heavy-metal music, fantasy novels and the visionary arts of the French Symbolists."

== Discography ==
- André Ethier with Christopher Sandes featuring Pickles and Price (2004)
- Secondathallam (2006)
- On Blue Fog (2007)
- Born of Blue Fog (2008)
- Under Grape Leaves (2017)
- Croak in the Weeds (2019)
- Further Up Island (2021)
- Fresh Pepper (2022, with Joseph Shabason)
- Cold Spaghetti (2024)
