= The Cansecos =

Canadian electronic music band

- Origin: Toronto, Ontario, Canada
- Genres: Electronic
- Years active: 2003–present
- Label: Upper Class
- Members: Bill Halliday; Gareth Jones; Paul Prince; Dan McCormick
- Website: thecansecos.com

The Cansecos is a Canadian electronic music band from Toronto formed in 2003. The band's debut self-titled album The Cansecos was released in 2003 on Upper Class Recordings, followed by second studio album Juices! in 2008. In addition to their two studio albums, The Cansecos have created a full-length remix album Juiced!, a disco mix Showers, and epic disco-electro remixes of Black Kids "Hurricane Jane" and Sally Shapiro "Hold Me So Tight".

== History ==
The Cansecos consists of writing and production duo Bill "The Billionaire" Halliday and Gareth "Generous G" Jones with rhythm team Paul "Princely P" Prince and Dan "Stealy Dan" McCormick. They released their debut album The Cansecos in 2003 on Upper Class Recordings. The album received an 8.2 on Pitchfork Media. "A Common State Of Being" from The Cansecos was used in Canadian director Aubrey Nealon's debut feature-length film "A Simple Curve".

In July 2007, The Cansecos posted a new full-length album Juiced! on their website for free download. They called it a full-length premix: an alternate version of the studio album Juices! they were preparing to release. Juiced! was a 70-minute disco mix mashed with all the acapellas from the forthcoming new studio album by The Cansecos.

In the beginning of 2008, Juices! the second studio album by The Cansecos was released on Upper Class Recordings.

In April 2008, The Cansecos posted a full-length disco mix album Showers on their website for free download. Allmusic named Showers one of their favourite mixes of 2008.

In May 2008, The Cansecos remixed Sally Shapiro "Hold Me So Tight" for the Sally Shapiro remix album Remix Romance Vol. 1.

In June 2008, The Cansecos remixed Black Kids "Hurricane Jane" for the Hurricane Jane Single. The Remix also appears on the new Black Kids EP Cemetery Lips.

In September 2008, The Cansecos were invited to play The closing party for the Toronto International Film Festival with Esthero.

In April 2009, "Raised By Wolves", the single from Juices! recently won the 2008 International Songwriting Competition Best Dance/Electronic Song of 2008.

== Discography ==
Studio Albums

| Year | Title | Label |
|---|---|---|
| 2003 | The Cansecos | Upper Class Recordings |
| 2008 | Juices! | Upper Class Recordings |

Remix Albums

| Year | Title | Free Download |
|---|---|---|
| 2007 | Juiced! | www.thecansecos.com |

Mix Albums

| Year | Title | Free Download |
|---|---|---|
| 2008 | Showers: A Disco Mix By The Cansecos | www.thecansecos.com |

Remixes

| Year | Artist | Title |
|---|---|---|
| 2007 | The Russian Futurists | Let's Get Ready To Crumble |
| 2007 | Small Sins | Holiday |
| 2007 | Vivek Shraya | Your Name |
| 2008 | Madrid | Reply To Everyone |
| 2008 | Sally Shapiro | Hold Me So Tight |
| 2008 | Black Kids | Hurricane Jane |
