= Watts Happening =

Studio album by Ohmega Watts
- Released: October 9, 2007
- Genre: Hip hop, soul, funk
- Label: Ubiquity Records

Ohmega Watts chronology
The Find (2005)	Watts Happening (2007)	Pieces of a Dream (2013)

Professional ratings
Review scores
Source	Rating
Rapzilla	link
Okayplayer	link

Watts Happening is rap artist Ohmega Watts' second album released on October 9, 2007.

== Track listing ==
1. "What's It Worth"
2. "Triple Double" (featuring Theory Hazit)
3. "No Delay" (featuring Surreal)
4. "Shorty Shouts"
5. "Model Citizen"
6. "Few and Far Between"
7. "Eyes and Ears" (featuring Jneiro Jarel and Shape of Broad Minds)
8. "Roc the Bells" (featuring Lightheaded)
9. "Adaptacao" (featuring Tita Lima)
10. "Saywhayusay"
11. "Are You Satisfied" (featuring Sugar Pie DeSanto)
12. "Dedicated"
13. "Memory Lane" (featuring Genahral Victor)
14. "Found"
15. "Work for Wealth" (featuring Ragen Fykes and Barry Hampton of Triple Grip)
16. "The Platypus Strut"
17. "Freak Out"
18. "Gone with the Wind"
