= Don't Sleep (album) =

2020 album by Alice Ivy

Studio album by Alice Ivy
- Released: 17 July 2020
- Label: Dew Process
- Producer: Annika Schmarsel

Alice Ivy chronology
I'm Dreaming (2018)	Don't Sleep (2020)	Do What Makes You Happy (2023)

Singles from Don't Sleep
- 1. "In My Mind" Released: 10 July 2019; 2. "Sunrise" Released: 8 November 2019; 3. "Don't Sleep" Released: 3 April 2020; 4. "Better Man" Released: 22 May 2020; 5. "Ticket to Heaven" Released: 17 July 2020

Don't Sleep is the second studio album by Australian electronic musician and producer Alice Ivy, released on 17 July 2020 by Dew Process. The album peaked at number 77 on the ARIA Charts.

In a statement, Ivy said "It's a body of work that features an abundance of voices that need to be heard and are generally not heard from enough. Some of those voices belong to women, some are non-binary, some are people of colour and some identify as First Nations people, some are members of the LGBTQI+ community and all of them have important stories to tell."

At the 2020 ARIA Music Awards, the album was nominated for Best Dance Release and Ivy was nominated for Engineer of the Year

The album was nominated for the 2020 Australian Music Prize and Australian Album of the Year at the J Awards of 2020. At the 2021 Music Victoria Awards, the album was nominated for Best Victorian Album.

== Critical reception ==
Professional ratings
Review scores
Source	Rating
The Music	4/5 stars
Sydney Morning Herald	4/5 stars
Beat Magazine	7.5/10
AllMusic	3.5/5 stars

Cyclone Wehner from The Music said "Don't Sleep is closer to an art mixtape than the traditional dance music 'producer' album – and it's a thrilling excursion."

Kish Lal from Sydney Morning Herald said This year is documented by songs written in quarantine, and Melbourne producer Alice Ivy joins the list with her second album... While at times the record stagnates, it's remedied by joyous electronica and melancholy balladry. The haunting, heavy 'Money' stands out, with a hook about the pain of unrewarded patience. Despite being surrounded by it, the record isn't defined by generational ennui, but rather by Ivy's coronation as a curator."

Leland Tan from Beat Magazine said "Ever-changing and dexterous, Alice Ivy has knocked it out of the park on her inclusive sophomore album, Don't Sleep. Dripping with luscious grooves that evoke a sense of vibrancy from a well-loved producer, every track holds the fort swimmingly in an album that’s an immediate cursor from debut, I'm Dreaming."

Marcy Donelson from AllMusic said "A touch uneven and mercurial but engaging and often infectious, Don't Sleep is another worthwhile set from an ambitious artist still finding her stride."

Sose Fuamoli from Triple J called the album "ambitious in its scope, international in its sound and a total vibe in its general delivery." Fuamoli added "Don't Sleep offers the listener a range of moods and sonic influences. Balancing falsettos with rich soulful harmonics and moments of romance and melancholy, the partnerships we see flourish on this album stand strong on their own as much as they do in informing Don't Sleep's broader sound.

Pilerats said "Throughout Don't Sleep, Alice Ivy's productions are central of everything that goes down; the backbone that links together musicians such as Thelma Plum side by side with others like Ecca Vandal, who use the platform to tell stories both of Alice's and their own."

== Track listing ==
No.	Title	Length
1.	"Champagne Late Nights"	1:08
2.	"Sunrise" (with Cadence Weapon)	3:39
3.	"In My Mind" (with Ecca Vandal)	2:47
4.	"Ticket to Heaven" (with Thelma Plum)	4:17
5.	"Don't Sleep" (with imbi and BOI)	3:25
6.	"I'll Find It" (featuring Odette)	3:57
7.	"Sweetest Love" (with Montaigne and Bertie Blackman)	3:26
8.	"All Hit Radio" (with Teef and Tessa)	2:35
9.	"Better Man" (with Benjamin Joseph)	3:22
10.	"Money" (with DijahSB)	1:45
11.	"All in for You" (with Ngaiire)	4:20
12.	"Gold" (with Bertie Blackman)	4:16

== Charts ==
Chart performance for Don't Sleep
Chart (2020)	Peak position
Australian Albums (ARIA)	77
