= The Husband (film) =

2013 film

- Directed by: Bruce McDonald
- Written by: Kelly Harms; Maxwell McCabe-Lokos
- Starring: Maxwell McCabe-Lokos
- Cinematography: Daniel Grant
- Music by: Todor Kobakov; Ian LeFeuvre
- Release dates: 9 September 2013 (TIFF); 14 March 2014 (Canada)
- Running time: 80 minutes
- Country: Canada
- Language: English

The Husband is a 2013 Canadian comedy film directed by Bruce McDonald. It was screened in the Special Presentation section at the 2013 Toronto International Film Festival.

== Cast ==
- Maxwell McCabe-Lokos as Henry Andreas
- Sarah Allen as Alyssa Andreas
- Dylan Authors as Colin Nesmith
- August Diehl as Rusty
- Joey Klein as Les
- Jodi Balfour as Claire
- Stephen McHattie as Armand
- Tony Nappo as Colin's Dad
