= I'm Doing It =

Studio album by E^ST
- Released: 31 July 2020
- Label: Warner

E^ST chronology
Life Ain't Always Roses (2018)	I'm Doing It (2020)

Singles from I'm Doing It
- 1. "Talk Deep" Released: 11 October 2019; 2. "Flight Path" Released: 20 December 2019; 3. "Fresh Out of Love" Released: 14 February 2020; 4. "Maybe It's Me" Released: 10 April 2020; 5. "I Wanna Be Here" Released: 19 June 2020

I'm Doing It is the debut studio album by Australian Indie pop singer E^ST. The album was announced on 10 March 2020, and was originally scheduled for release on 10 June 2020 but was delayed until 31 July 2020 due to the COVID-19 pandemic. Two secret shows planned for Melbourne and Sydney were also cancelled.

Speaking to Eat This Music, E^ST explains I'm Doing It "is an album about feeling like you don't have your act together and trying to navigate heartbreak and mental health struggles while trying to better yourself as a person."

The album was nominated for Best Album at the 2021 Rolling Stone Australia Awards.

== Critical reception ==
Professional ratings
Review scores
Source	Rating
The AU Review	4/5 stars
The Music AU	4/5 stars

Dylan Marshall of The AU Review said "First and foremost, I'm Doing It portrays E^ST as an artist who’s freshly out of a relationship and looking at not only getting through it, but becoming a better person because of it". Marshall went on to say "[it's] an album full of emotion, story telling and embracing the basic needs and wants of being a human; I'm Doing It is a rollercoaster of emotions."

In a positive review, James d'Apice of The Music AU said "If an artist is pretty good by their late teens - as E^ST was - there's an expectation that by their early 20s they should be near their peak. Anything less would be a disappointment. Here, with E^ST’s debut album, we hold that most delicious of cultural products: potential realised. Treasure this."

Poppy Reid of Rolling Stone Australia said the album "shows a maturity redolent of a person who was not only willing to feel every piece of their heart when it broke, but also displayed each piece in front of them, examining the fractures before piecing it back together."

Jackson Langford of Music Feeds exclaimed "Naming your debut album I'm Doing It is a bold and soul-bearing move. It can be said in a defiant and resistant way. It can be said in a defeatist and morose way. It can be said with eyes closed and heart open, as you prepare to dive headfirst into the deep unknown. E^ST goes through all that and then some on her long-awaited first LP, as she struggles to process heartbreak and scrambles to put the pieces back together again."

== Track listing ==
I'm Doing It track listing
No.	Title	Length
1.	"Fit for Company"	1:41
2.	"Flight Path"	2:45
3.	"Maybe It's Me"	2:45
4.	"Found Somebody"	3:21
5.	"Fresh Out of Love"	2:50
6.	"I'm Not Funny Anymore"	2:55
7.	"Turn"	1:59
8.	"Talk Deep"	3:27
9.	"No One with You"	2:48
10.	"Walking Home in the Rain"	2:43
11.	"Get Through"	2:47
12.	"I Wanna Be Here"	3:00
13.	"I'm Doing It"	3:03

== Charts ==
Chart performance for I'm Doing It
Chart (2020)	Peak position
Australian Albums (ARIA)	12

== Release history ==
Region	Date	Format	Label	Catalogue	Ref.
Australia	31 July 2020	CD; LP; Digital download; streaming	Warner Music Australia	5419707640	
