= The Russian Futurists =

Canadian indie pop band

- Origin: Toronto, Ontario, Canada
- Genres: Synth-pop, indie rock, indie pop, indietronica, alternative rock, hip-hop
- Years active: 2000–present
- Labels: Upper Class Recordings, EMI, Memphis Industries
- Members: Matthew Adam Hart

The Russian Futurists are a Canadian indie pop band based in Toronto. Their music can be described as lo-fi, indie-electronica fused with a twee-pop temperament. The band started as a solo project of Matthew Adam Hart (born 1978), and later expanded into a band for live performances.

== History ==
Hart was born and raised in Cornwall, Ontario. Influenced by songwriters like Stephin Merritt of The Magnetic Fields, he spent his early career creating indie hip-hop tracks, using improvised gear, in Cornwall and in Peterborough, Ontario.

Hart's first album under the name The Russian Futurists was released by Upper Class Recordings in 2000, and titled The Method of Modern Love. The album was praised by Graham Coxon of Blur and Peter Buck of R.E.M. Uncut magazine called it "one of the most melodically seductive and exhilarating records of recent times". The band also received positive reviews in Pitchfork, Spin, The Guardian, and XLR8R.

In 2004, the band toured in the U.S., Canada, and Spain. They toured with Peter Bjorn and John, Caribou, and Junior Boys.

Hart recorded the first three lo-fi Futurists albums in his Toronto home, including 2005's Our Thickness; in June 2005 the album appeared on the !earshot Top 200 chart.

The band's track "Paul Simon" was chosen by Samsung to include on its phones as a featured song. Hart has remixed other artists' singles, including "Tonight I Have to Leave It" by Shout Out Louds and "The First Five Times" by Stars.

For The Russian Futurists' fourth studio album, looking for more sophisticated production, Hart began recording in a New York studio. The band released the album, The Weight’s On The Wheels, worldwide on November 16, 2010. It was produced by Hart with the aid of Michael Musmanno (Outkast, Lilys, Arrested Development). The lead single "Hoeing Weeds Sowing Seeds", was mixed by Grammy Award winner Michael Brauer (Coldplay, John Mayer, The Bravery). The album, ten tracks in total feature tracks "Horseshoe Fortune", "Register My Firearms? No Way!", "100 Shopping Days 'Til Christmas", and "One Night, One Kiss", a duet with Heavy Blinkers singer Ruth Minnikin.

The Russian Futurists released a music video for "One Night, One Kiss" off their 2010 fourth studio album, The Weight's on the Wheels. The songs "Paul Simon" and "Precious Metals" are featured on the NBA 2K11 soundtrack.

In September 2013, Hart began a 9-year stint as cohost of the morning show on Toronto's CIND-FM. He left the station in February 2022, and later hosted weekends on Toronto's CFXJ-FM.

Hart shifted to producing several hip-hop projects in 2022. He was credited with co-producing the track "Ghost Photo" by Milano Constantine and Big Ghost Ltd. He also produced the EP From Russia With Love 2 by Allah Preme of The Umbrella Collective.

The latest Russian Futurists release is a co-production between Hart and Toronto producer Jordache (aka Andrew Carr). The EP entitled Don't Die was released on October 31, 2022.

Hart and Carr released two more EPs, Don't Die and The Yearling under the Russian Futurists x Jordache banner.

Hart continues to produce beats for U.S. rappers including "Comment Section" by Roc Marciano signee Grea8gawd.

== Discography ==
=== Albums ===
- The Method of Modern Love (2000)
- Let's Get Ready to Crumble (2002)
- Our Thickness (2005)
- Me, Myself And Rye... An Introduction To The Russian Futurists (2006, Memphis Industries)
- The Weight's on the Wheels (Nov 2010)

=== Singles ===
- "Paul Simon" (2006)
- Hoeing Weeds Sowing Seeds + Remixes EP (2010)
- "One Night, One Kiss" (2011)
- "Comment Section" - Grea8gawd ft. The Russian Futurists (2025)

=== Compilations ===
- Me Myself & Rye... An Introduction to The Russian Futurists (2006)

=== EPs ===
- Ecole de Neige (1998)
- Reality Burger With A Side Of Life (2019)
- Don't Die (2022)
- The Yearling (2025)
