= Melisa Bester =

South African-born Australian singer-songwriter and musician

- Also known as: E^ST (2014–2022)
- Born: Melisa Bester; 2 January 1998 (age 28); South Africa
- Origin: Central Coast, New South Wales, Australia
- Genres: Indie pop, electronica
- Occupations: Singer, songwriter, musician
- Instrument: Vocals
- Years active: 2014–present
- Labels: Warner, Parlophone, Fueled by Ramen
- Member of: Headaches

Melisa Bester is a South African-born Australian singer-songwriter and musician, best known for her former solo project E^ST. Under that moniker, Bester released four extended plays: Old Age (2014), The Alley (September 2015), Get Money! (July 2016) and Life Ain't Always Roses (October 2018). Her debut studio album, I'm Doing It, was released on 31 July 2020. Bester also toured nationally as a support act for Twenty One Pilots in March–April 2016 and for Panic! at the Disco in October 2018.

As of 2023, Bester has released music under the moniker Headaches and Golden Vessel.

== Biography ==
Melisa Bester was born in South Africa and moved to Australia's Central Coast as a child.

=== 2014–2018: Career beginnings ===
Bester released her debut four-track extended play, Old Age, in July 2014. Dean Elphick of Happy Mag, described her first EP, "One thing that was evident on that debut was that she already sounded like a confident, established artist. Lots of people can sing well but it's obvious she has serious songwriting ability that stretch beyond her young years." In September 2015, she performed a mashup of The Verve's "Bitter Sweet Symphony" and Massive Attack's "Teardrop" for a Like a Version session on Triple J national radio. Her second four-track EP, The Alley, was issued in September 2015.

Bester then collaborated with Jim Eliot on the song "Life Goes On" in 2017. On 27 July 2018, it was announced that she signed with rock label Fueled By Ramen. She was the opening act for Twenty One Pilots during the Australian leg of the Blurryface tour in March–April 2016. She also backed Panic! at the Disco local leg of the Pray for the Wicked tour in October 2018. She headlined her own tour in support of her fourth EP, Life Ain't Always Roses, which was released on 26 October 2018.

=== 2019–2022: I'm Doing It to hiatus ===
In March 2020, Bester announced the release of her debut studio album, initially scheduling it for release on 12 June 2020. The album was preceding by the singles "Talk Deep" "Flight Path", "Fresh Out of Love", "Maybe It's Me" and "I Wanna Be Here". The album was later delayed and released on 31 July 2020. Following a run of shows in early 2021, Bester took an extended hiatus from music. She briefly resurfaced in 2022 to appear on the song "Funeral" by Sydney singer-songwriter Nick Ward on his debut EP, Brand New You. She joined Ward in the triple j studios to perform it for Like a Version, as well as a cover of blink-182's 2000 single "Adam's Song".

=== 2023–present: Headaches and Golden Vessel ===
In October 2023, after her accounts had been deactivated for over two years, Bester returned to social media to announce that she would no longer be performing as E^ST. Simultaneously, Bester announced that she had started a new musical project under the name Headaches in collaboration with songwriter and producer Maxwell Byrne – also known as Golden Vessel. An album was released on 24 May 2024.

== Discography ==
=== Studio albums ===
List of studio albums, with selected details
Title	Details	Peak chart positions
Title	Details	AUS
I'm Doing It	Released: 31 July 2020; Label: Warner Music Australia; Formats: CD, LP, digital download, streaming	12

=== Extended plays ===
List of EPs released, showing year released and label details
Title	Details	Peak chart positions
Title	Details	AUS
Old Age	Released: 1 July 2014; Label: I Am East/Warner Music Australasia (EAST01); Formats: Digital download, streaming	—
The Alley	Released: 18 September 2015; Label: Cap/Warner Music Australasia (825646050017); Formats: Digital download, streaming	— (Note: The Alley did not enter the ARIA Albums Chart, but peaked at number 14 on the Australian Artists Singles Chart.)
Get Money!	Released: 1 July 2016; Label: Warner Music Australasia (5419723172); Formats: Digital download, streaming	96
Life Ain't Always Roses	Released: 26 October 2018; Label: Warner Music Australasia (5419703144); Formats: Digital download, streaming, CD	— (Note: Life Ain't Always Roses did not enter the ARIA Charts, but peaked at number 34 on the ARIA Digital Albums Chart.)

=== Singles ===
==== As lead artist as E^ST ====
List of singles released, with selected certifications shown
Title	Year	Peak chart positions	Certifications	Album
Title	Year	AUS	Certifications	Album
"Old Age"	2014	—		Old Age
"The Alley"	2015	—		The Alley
"Get Money!" (featuring Mallrat)	2016	—		Get Money!
"Life Goes On"	2017	— (Note: "Life Goes On" did not enter the ARIA Charts, but peaked at number 14 on the ARIA Australian Artists Streaming Chart.)	ARIA: Platinum	Non-album single
"Blowjob"	2018	—		Life Ain't Always Roses
"I Don't Lack Imagination"	2018	—		Life Ain't Always Roses
"Alien"	2018	—		Life Ain't Always Roses
"Friends"	2018	—		Life Ain't Always Roses
"Talk Deep"	2019	—		I'm Doing It
"Flight Path"	2019	—		I'm Doing It
"Fresh Out of Love"	2020	—		I'm Doing It
"Maybe It's Me"	2020	—		I'm Doing It
"I Wanna Be Here"	2020	—		I'm Doing It

==== As featured artist as E^ST ====
List of singles as featured artist, showing year released and album
Title	Year	Album
"Get Me a Drink" (Alice Ivy featuring E^ST & Charlie Threads)	2017	I'm Dreaming
"Bigbright" (Golden Vessel featuring Elkkle, E^ST & Duckwrth)	2018	Slowshine
"Nobody" (Kwame featuring E^ST)	2019	Please, Get Home Safe
"Funeral" (Nick Ward featuring E^ST)	2022	Brand New You

==== As Headaches and Golden Vessel ====
List of studio albums, with selected details
Title	Details
Making Friends With The Space Around Me	Released: 24 May 2024; Label: sumoclic; Formats: digital download, streaming

List of singles released as Headaches, with selected details shown
Title	Year	Peak chart positions	Album
Title	Year	AUS	Album
"Make It Somehow"	2023	—	Making Friends With The Space Around Me
"Happy Days in Happy Weather"	2023	—	Making Friends With The Space Around Me
"I Inhabit My Life (And It Feels So Good)"	2024	—	Making Friends With The Space Around Me
"The Song of You"	2024	—	Making Friends With The Space Around Me
"Be My Own Man"	2024	—	Making Friends With The Space Around Me
"A Song for You"	2024	—	Making Friends With The Space Around Me

== Awards and nominations ==
=== National Live Music Awards ===
The National Live Music Awards (NLMAs) are a broad recognition of Australia's diverse live industry, celebrating the success of the Australian live scene. The awards commenced in 2016.

Year	Nominee / work	Award	Result
National Live Music Awards of 2020	herself	Musicians Making a Difference	Nominated

=== Rolling Stone Australia Awards ===
The Rolling Stone Australia Awards are awarded annually in January or February by the Australian edition of Rolling Stone magazine for outstanding contributions to popular culture in the previous year.

Year	Nominee / work	Award	Result	Ref.
2021	I'm Doing It	Best Record	Nominated	
2021	E^ST	Best New Artist	Nominated	
