= Secrets and Lies (album) =

Studio album by Bertie Blackman
- Released: 27 April 2009
- Length: 50:38
- Label: Forum 5

Bertie Blackman chronology
Black (2006)	Secrets and Lies (2009)	Pope Innocent X (2012)

Secrets and Lies is the third studio album by Australian singer-songwriter Bertie Blackman, released in April 2009. The album peaked number 49 on the ARIA chart.

At the AIR Awards of 2009, the album was nominated for Breakthrough Independent Album. At the J Awards of 2009, the album was nominated for Australian Album of the Year. The album was nominated for the 2009 Australian Music Prize.

At the ARIA Music Awards of 2009, the album won the ARIA Award for Best Independent Release.

== Track listing ==
1. "Sky Is Falling" - 4:08
2. "Thump" - 3:33
3. "Black Cats" - 3:13
4. "Heart" - 4:08
5. "White Owl" - 3:14
6. "Byrds of Prey" - 3:26
7. "Come to Bed" - 4:20
8. "Clocks" 3:40
9. "Shout Out" - 4:24
10. "Lust and Found" - 4:16
11. "Town of Sorrow" - 4:44
12. "Baby Teeth" - 3:40
13. "Valentine" - 3:57

== Charts ==
Chart (2009)	Peak position
Australian Albums (ARIA)	49
