= Life Goes On (E^ST song) =

Single by E^ST
- Released: 29 September 2017
- Length: 3:30
- Label: Warner
- Songwriter(s): Melisa Bester, Jim Eliot

E^ST singles chronology
"Get Money!" (2016)	"Life Goes On" (2017)	"Blowjob" (2018)

Music video
- "Life Goes On" on YouTube

"Life Goes On" is a song by Australian recording artist E^ST. The song was released on 29 September 2017 and was certified platinum in 2021.

E^ST said the song came to life during a writing stint in the UK with producer Jim Eliot. She said "As soon as he played that piano line I knew what I wanted to write about. [The song is about] something very personal to me, about ghosts that aren't physically with you anymore but still leave an impression. It's admitting to missing someone but accepting that you have to let go of people sometimes."

== Reception ==
Camilla Patini from Purple Sneakers said "It's hard to imagine a voice more equipped to cover adolescent heartbreak... it is undeniably strong and capable of emotional depth. Her confident vocals shine through on this track especially, which is driven by a dance-y, light beat despite its sad subject matter."

== Track listings ==
1-track single
No.	Title	Length
1.	"Life Goes On"	3:30

Remixes
No.	Title	Length
1.	"Life Goes On" (KC Lights remix)	5:36
2.	"Life Goes On" (Alice Ivy remix)	3:54
3.	"Life Goes On" (TWILO remix)	3:29

== Charts ==
Chart (2017)	Peak position
Australian Artists Streaming Chart (ARIA)	14

== Certification ==
Region	Certification	Certified units/sales
Australia (ARIA)	Platinum	70,000^{‡}
^{‡} Sales+streaming figures based on certification alone.
