= Breaking Kayfabe =

Studio album by Cadence Weapon
- Released: November 28, 2005
- Studios: Zonik Studios (Edmonton, Alberta); Up in Arms Studios (Edmonton, Alberta)
- Genre: Hip-hop
- Length: 49:40
- Label: Upper Class
- Producers: Cadence Weapon and Nik Kozub

Cadence Weapon chronology
Breaking Kayfabe (2005)	Afterparty Babies (2008)

Breaking Kayfabe is the debut album by Canadian rapper Cadence Weapon, released in 2005 on Upper Class Recordings. It was also released in the United States by Anti-Records on March 13, 2007. Breaking kayfabe is a professional wrestling term for "breaking character".

Breaking Kayfabe received positive reviews from critics who praised the 8-bit style beats and intellectual lyrics meshing well together. The album was shortlisted for the 2006 Polaris Music Prize. However, it lost to Final Fantasy's He Poos Clouds.

== Critical reception ==
Professional ratings
Aggregate scores
Source	Rating
Metacritic	80/100
Review scores
Source	Rating
AllMusic	4/5 stars
Drowned in Sound	9/10
Okayplayer	3/5 stars
Pitchfork	8.0/10
Stylus Magazine	B

Breaking Kayfabe garnered highly positive reviews from music critics. At Metacritic, which assigns a normalized rating out of 100 to reviews from mainstream critics, the album received an average score of 80, based on 9 reviews.

Francis Jones of Drowned in Sound praised the songs for having both production and lyrics feel equal and unique, calling it "a record that demands and deserves undivided attention, its creator fashioning a brain-searing patchwork of ragged rap, electronic flourishes and truncated rhythms." Marisa Brown of AllMusic also praised Cadence for crafting electro beats over tracks that carry intelligent lyrics, concluding that "Breaking Kayfabe is a cohesive set of songs, backpacker in the best of senses, smart and witty and provocative, experimental and well-produced, but at the same time very raw and very real-sounding. It's not often that a debut does all this correctly; listeners would be wise to pay attention." Peter Macia of Pitchfork gave praise to Cadence for foregoing hip-hop conventions and instead worked on smart lyricism and video game-inspired production, concluding that it "may not be his masterpiece, but it hints that he may be capable of one." Ian Mathers of Stylus Magazine noted that the production starts to sound droll at first but found it and the lyricism shining bright after a few listens, concluding with, "Too exciting for the underground (maybe), too weird for the overground (hopefully not), he deserves to be heard by both; I'm willing to bet it's all because he's Canadian."

== Track listing ==
No.	Title	Length
1.	"Oliver Square"	3:33
2.	"Sharks"	3:59
3.	"Grim Fandango"	3:36
4.	"Black Hand"	3:47
5.	"30 Seconds"	3:34
6.	"Diamond Cutter"	2:45
7.	"Holy Smoke"	3:16
8.	"Fathom"	4:01
9.	"Turning on Your Sign"	3:44
10.	"Lisa's Spider"	2:31
11.	"Vicarious"	4:20
12.	"Julie Will Jump the Broom"	10:19

== Personnel ==
Adapted from the liner notes of Breaking Kayfabe.

- Cadence Weapon: producer
- Nik Kozub: recording, engineering, producing, mixing (Zonik Studios in August 2004)
- DJ Nato: recording (Up in Arms Studios in January 2005)
- DJ Weezl: cuts
- Ashley Andel: artwork
- Sebastijan Isakovic: vector art
