= Me Myself & Rye... An Introduction to The Russian Futurists =

Greatest hits album by the Russian Futurists
- Released: 2006
- Recorded: 1998–2005
- Genres: Synth-pop, indie rock, indie pop, indietronica, alternative rock
- Label: Memphis Industries
- Producer: Matthew Adam Hart

Professional ratings
Review scores
Source	Rating
Pitchfork	(8.1/10) link

Me Myself & Rye... An Introduction to The Russian Futurists is a greatest hits compilation of songs from the Russian Futurists' first three albums.

== Track listing ==
All songs were written by Matthew Adam Hart.

1. "Let's Get Ready to Crumble"
2. "Paul Simon"
3. "Our Pen's Out of Ink"
4. "Precious Metals"
5. "It's Not Really Cold When It Snows"
6. "The Science of the Seasons"
7. "Hurtin' 4 Certain"
8. "A Telegram from the Future"
9. "2 Dots on a Map"
10. "Your Big Brown Eyes and My Big Broke Heart"
11. "C'mon"
12. "Still Life"
13. "A Mind's Dying Verse (You and the Wine)"

Track 6,10,11 and 13 from The Method of Modern Love (2001)

Tracks 1,4,5 and 8 from Let's Get Ready to Crumble (2003)

Tracks 2,3,7,9 and 12 from Our Thickness (2005)
