= The Weight's on the Wheels =

Studio album by the Russian Futurists
- Released: November 16, 2010
- Genre: Indie pop
- Length: 37:28
- Label: Upper Class Recordings
- Producer: Matthew Adam Hart

The Russian Futurists chronology
Our Thickness (2005)	The Weight's on the Wheels (2010)

The Weight's on the Wheels is the fourth studio album by Canadian indie pop band the Russian Futurists, released on November 16, 2010 on Upper Class Recordings.

== Reception ==
According to Metacritic, The Weight's on the Wheels has a score of 63 out of 100, indicating "generally favorable reviews". One of the most positive reviews came from Robert Christgau, who gave the album an A− grade. In contrast, Matthew Cole of Slant Magazine awarded the album a mere half-star out of five, calling it "a candygram from the heart of a giddy, geeky romantic who has somehow had his rose-tinted frames surgically grafted to his face."

Professional ratings
Aggregate scores
Source	Rating
Metacritic	63/100
Review scores
Source	Rating
AllMusic	3/5 stars
American Songwriter	3/5 stars
The A.V. Club	C
Filter	83%
MSN Music (Expert Witness)	A–
NOW	3/5
Pitchfork	7.5/10
PopMatters	7/10
Slant Magazine	0.5/5 stars
Spin	7/10

== Track listing ==
All tracks are written by Matthew Adam Hart.

No.	Title	Length
1.	"Hoeing Weeds Sowing Seeds"	3:39
2.	"Golden Years"	4:14
3.	"One Night, One Kiss"	5:15
4.	"Register My Firearms? No Way!"	2:51
5.	"100 Shopping Days 'Til Christmas"	3:53
6.	"To Be Honest"	3:17
7.	"Plates"	2:53
8.	"Tripping Horses"	3:03
9.	"Walk with a Crutch"	3:20
10.	"Horseshoe Fortune"	5:03
Total length:		37:28
