= The Deadly Snakes =

Canadian indie rock band

- Origin: Toronto, Canada
- Genres: Garage rock, indie rock
- Years active: 1996–2006, 2009
- Labels: Sympathy for the Record Industry, In the Red, Paper Bag
- Past members: André Ethier; Matthew "Matt-Dog" Carlson; Chad Ross; Jeremi Madsen; Max "Age of Danger" McCabe-Lokos; Andrew Moszynski; Greg Cartwright; Carson Binks; Yuri Didrichson; James Sayce; Randy Ray; Nathan Whitlock

The Deadly Snakes were a Canadian indie rock band influenced by garage rock, folk rock, and early R&B.

== History ==
Formed in Toronto in 1996, the band's final line-up consisted of André Ethier on vocals and guitars, Matthew Carlson on guitar, trumpet and bass, Chad Ross on guitar, bass and mandolin, Jeremi Madsen on guitar, bass, saxophone and percussion, Max McCabe-Lokos (using the stage name Age of Danger) on piano, organ and percussion, and Andrew "Gunn" Moszynski on guitar and drums. Earlier versions of the band included Carson Binks (now of San Francisco's Genghis Khan) on saxophone, and - at different times - Yuri Didrichsons, James Sayce (both later of Toronto-based indie band Tangiers) and Randy Ray on bass. Greg Cartwright, of The Oblivians and The Reigning Sound, produced the band's first two albums. He briefly joined The Deadly Snakes, playing guitar and singing several songs on the album I'm Not Your Soldier Anymore, and touring as a member of the band in support of that album.

Originally formed as a one-off band for a friend's birthday party, the Snakes kept performing together and soon became a popular draw on Toronto's live music scene. After releasing several 7" singles, the Deadly Snakes released their full-length debut album, Love Undone, in 1999 on the Sympathy for the Record Industry label.

The band toured both Canada and internationally and released three further albums via In the Red Records. Their 2005 single "Gore Veil", from the album Porcella, was named the fifth best song of the year by CBC Radio 3. The album Porcella was subsequently shortlisted for the 2006 Polaris Music Prize.

The Deadly Snakes announced their amicable breakup in August 2006, and played their last show on August 26, 2006 at the Silver Dollar Room.

In September 2009, rumours of a full-fledged reunion began to circulate following the announcement of a one-off reunion show at the free-of-charge Scion Garage Fest on October 17 in Portland, Oregon.

Ethier has released numerous albums as a solo artist. He is also a painter whose work has been exhibited internationally. Ross and Gunn formed the band Quest for Fire, who released their self-titled debut on Tee Pee Records in 2009. McCabe-Lokos is an actor and filmmaker who has appeared in Land of the Dead, Lars and the Real Girl, and The Incredible Hulk.

== Discography ==
- Love Undone (Sympathy for the Record Industry, 1999)
- I'm Not Your Soldier Anymore (In the Red, 2001)
- Ode to Joy (In the Red, 2003)
- Porcella (In the Red, 2005)

== See also ==
- Music of Canada
- Canadian rock
- List of Canadian musicians
- List of bands from Canada
- Category:Canadian musical groups
