= Alice Ivy =

Australian musician

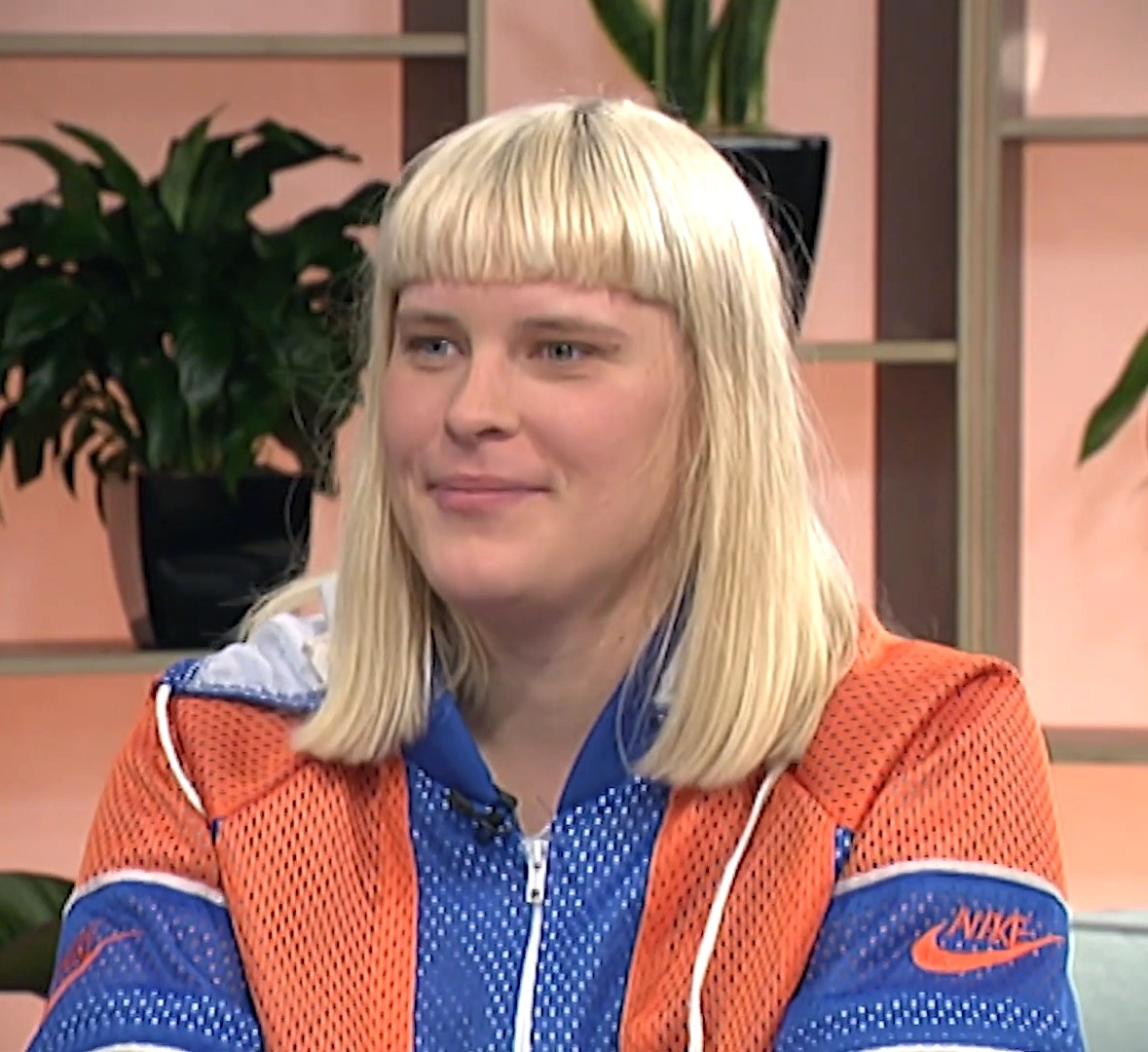
- Ivy in 2018

Background information
- Born: Annika Schmarsel; 8 July 1993 (age 33); Geelong, Victoria, Australia
- Origin: Melbourne, Victoria, Australia
- Genres: Hip hop; electronic; soul; alternative dance; indie rock
- Occupations: Musician; remixer; record producer; songwriter
- Instruments: Guitar; keyboards; synthesisers
- Years active: 2015–present
- Labels: Dew Process, Last Gang
- Formerly of: The Sweethearts
- Website: www.aliceivymusic.net

Annika Schmarsel (born 8 July 1993), better known by her stage name Alice Ivy, is an Australian electronic musician and producer. Alice Ivy was the winner of the 2016 Triple J Unearthed Listen Out competition. She has released three studio albums: I'm Dreaming (2018), Don't Sleep (2020), which reached No. 77 on the ARIA Albums Chart, and Do What Makes You Happy (2024).

== Early life ==
Annika Schmarsel was born and raised in Geelong, Victoria to German immigrants who settled there in 1987. "German was my first language. In kindie I was the German girl who couldn't speak a word of English, so I had to learn."

At the age of twelve, on a family trip to Germany, Schmarsel's grandmother taught her guitar chords while her uncle taught her how to play "Smoke on the Water" by Deep Purple. During high school a year later, she was a member of a 25-member soul big band and on-going music project, The Sweethearts. In 2014, Schmarsel moved to Melbourne to study for a music industry degree at RMIT University, and was introduced to the music software Ableton. She learnt about influential electronic producers including the late J Dilla.

== Music career ==
=== 2015–2018: Early years and I'm Dreaming ===
On 3 January 2015, Annika Schmarsel under the alias 'Alice Ivy', released her debut single "Charlie". On 14 April, she released her next single "Mean Man's Bite" featuring guest vocals from Chloe Beckwith. On 26 June, Alice Ivy released her single "Paint Me Blue" again featuring vocals by Chloe Beckwith. On 13 November, Alice Ivy released the single "Walk On" featuring Indigo Fly.

On 25 January 2016, Alice Ivy released her single "Touch" featuring guest vocals by Georgia van Etten, a music video was released on 8 February animated by James Thompson and Bill Presser. On 23 June, she released "Almost Here" featuring vocals by RaRa. The two singles quickly became her most popular, having collectively amassed over 3,000,000 streams on Spotify. Alice Ivy then performed a five-date tour to promote the two singles in July. On 2 September, Alice Ivy remixed "Float" by Thomston.

In March 2017, she released her single "Get Me a Drink" featuring E^ST and Charlie Threads, it became her first track to be added to high rotation on Triple J. The Age placed the track at #8 in their "Best Songs Of 2017". On 21 April, she remixed "Beat the Keeper" by Taj Ralph. On 26 May, Alice Ivy remixed "Kate's Bed" by Huntly. In September, after signing a deal with Australian record label Dew Process she released "Be Friends" featuring guest vocals from Tim de Cotta and Caseaux O.S.L.O. On 22 September, Alice Ivy released a remix of "West" by Lakyn. On 10 November, Alice Ivy remixed the track "Life Goes On" by E^ST. On 12 December, a music video was released for her track "Be Friends".

On 12 January 2018, she released the single "Chasing Stars" featuring ARIA award-winning singer-songwriter, Bertie Blackman. Both "Be Friends", and "Chasing Stars" were also added to high rotation as well. Later that month, Alice Ivy signed onto Last Gang Records for international releases. In the middle of that year, "Chasing Stars" became the eleventh most played track on Triple J. On 9 February, her debut album I'm Dreaming was released. It contained most her previously released singles including "Charlie". To promote her debut album, Ivy performed an eight-date national headlining tour ranging from 16 February until 29 March and performing in Sydney, Brisbane, Melbourne, Adelaide, Perth, Panama Festival in Tasmania, The Hills are Alive in Victoria, and Bendigo. On 30 March, Alice Ivy covered Estelle's track "American Boy" with E^ST and Miss Blanks for Triple J's Like a Version. On 6 April, Ivy remixed the track "Panopticon" by Cloud Control. On 13 April, Alice Ivy along with other remixers TOKiMONSTA, Maria Marcus, and Maya Jane Coles, all made their own remixes of "Lady Powers" by Vera Blue featuring Kodi Shane, released on Lady Powers | Power Ladies Remix EP. On 8 August, she released a remix of "Clothes I Slept In" by Luca Brasi. On 7 September, Alice Ivy remixed the track "Real Love" by Flint Eastwood.

=== 2019–2020: Don't Sleep ===
On 9 February 2019, rain damaged Alice Ivy's equipment and she was unable to play at the Tasmanian music festival Party In The Paddock the day after as planned. The rain damaged her laptop, guitar pedals and drum pad. Ivy stated she would play in Tasmania again as soon as she was able to. On 15 February, Alice Ivy released a remix of Amwin's track "DeLorean". On 22 February, Alice Ivy released a new single entitled "Close to You" featuring Flint Eastwood. She also announced a "Close to You" tour starting in May with Miss Blanks, who previously collaborated with Alice Ivy for Triple J's Like a Version. The tour is slated to start in Adelaide, and then go on to Wollongong, Canberra, Sydney, Melbourne, Hobart, Fremantle, Brisbane and the Gold Coast. On 22 March, a remix of "Fooling Around" by Japanese Wallpaper was released. On 30 April, a music video for "Close to You" was released. The video featured Ivy's dog "Lexie". On 10 July, Ivy released the single "In My Mind" featuring Ecca Vandal alongside an accompanying music video. On 6 November, Alice Ivy released the single "Sunrise" featuring Cadence Weapon alongside an accompanying music video.

On 1 April 2020, Alice Ivy released "Don't Sleep" the titular single of her upcoming second studio album Don't Sleep, set to release on 17 July. The single featured Imbi the Girl and Boi. She also released an accompanying music video for the single. On 27 May, Alice Ivy released the fourth single from her then-forthcoming album titled "Better Man" featuring Safia frontman Benjamin Joseph. A music video was released alongside starring comedian and radio personality Alex Dyson. Her sophomore studio album was officially released on 18 July. The twelve-track album contained her four previously released singles, and seven other tracks featuring guest vocals. The track "Ticket to Heaven" featured Thelma Plum, "I'll Find It" featured Odette, "Sweetest Love" featured Montaigne and Bertie Blackman, "All Hit Radio" featured Teef and Tessa (vocalist for the band Tessa & the Typecast), "Money" featured DijahSB, "All In For You" featured Ngaiire, and "Gold" also featured Bertie Blackman. Don't Sleep peaked at number 77 on the ARIA charts.

=== 2021–present: Do What Makes You Happy ===
On 28 July 2021, Alice Ivy was featured on "Someone Stranger" by Georgia Maq the singer, songwriter and guitarist for Camp Cope. Alice Ivy begun teasing a new single from 8 October, collaborating with Brisbane-based pop artist Sycco and American bassist Nick Movshon. Their single "Weakness" was released on 22 October with an accompanying music video directed by Dom Gould. The single and music video were recorded separately in Brisbane and Melbourne due to COVID-19 lock-down restrictions. Airlock Studios in Brisbane, and XO Studios in Melbourne.

On 23 June 2023, Ivy released "Howlin' At the New Moon" and announced her third studio album, Do What Makes You Happy.

== Musical style ==
Alice Ivy lists her influences as Marvin Gaye, Diana Ross and Etta James. Other influences include The Avalanches, J Dilla, Onra, Anderson Paak, Mark Ronson. Her sound has also been likened to Gramatik, L'Orange and Curtis Mayfield. She says that soul and Motown music inspired her to explore music production, and these influences particularly shine through on her 2020 single "Weakness".

== Discography ==
=== Studio albums ===
List of studio albums, with release date, label, and selected chart positions shown
Title	Album details	Peak chart positions
Title	Album details	AUS
I'm Dreaming	Released: 9 February 2018; Label: Dew Process, Last Gang; Format: LP, digital download, streaming	—
Don't Sleep	Released: 17 July 2020; Label: Dew Process; Format: LP, digital download, streaming	77 (Note: Don't Sleep also peaked at number 5 on the Top 20 Vinyl Albums Chart.)
Do What Makes You Happy	Released: 22 November 2024; Label: Helix, Payday; Format: CD, digital download, streaming	59

=== Singles ===
==== As lead artist ====
List of singles, with year released and album shown
Title	Year	Certifications	Album
"Charlie"	2015		I'm Dreaming
"Mean Man's Bite" (featuring Chloe Beckwith)	2015		Non-album singles
"Paint Me Blue" (featuring Chloe Beckwith)	2015		Non-album singles
"Walk On" (featuring Indigo Fly)	2015		Non-album singles
"Touch" (featuring Georgia van Etten)	2016		I'm Dreaming
"Almost Here" (featuring RaRa)	2016		I'm Dreaming
"Get Me a Drink" (featuring E^ST & Charlie Threads)	2017		I'm Dreaming
"Be Friends" (featuring Tim de Cotta & Caseaux O.S.L.O)	2017		I'm Dreaming
"Chasing Stars" (featuring Bertie Blackman)	2018		I'm Dreaming
"Close to You" (featuring Flint Eastwood)	2019		Non-album single
"In My Mind" (featuring Ecca Vandal)	2019	ARIA: Gold	Don't Sleep
"Sunrise" (featuring Cadence Weapon)	2019		Don't Sleep
"Don't Sleep" (featuring Imbi the Girl and Boi)	2020		Don't Sleep
"Better Man" (featuring Benjamin Joseph)	2020		Don't Sleep
"Ticket to Heaven" (featuring Thelma Plum	2020		Don't Sleep
"Weakness" (with Sycco)	2021		Non-album single
"Howlin' At the New Moon" (featuring Mayer Hawthorne)	2023		Do What Makes You Happy
"Broke My Heart" (featuring Mallrat and Jelani Blackman)	2023		Do What Makes You Happy
"Wildlife"	2023		Do What Makes You Happy
"Popstar" (featuring Låpsley)	2024		Do What Makes You Happy
"Criminal" (with Kah-Lo and BJ The Chicago Kid)	2024		Do What Makes You Happy
"Wave" (with Daktyl)	2024		
"Do I Need to Know What Love Is?" (with Josh Teskey)	2024		Do What Makes You Happy
"Smile"	2024		Do What Makes You Happy

==== As featured artist ====
List of singles, with year released and album shown
Title	Year	Album
"Someone Stranger" (Georgia Maq featuring Alice Ivy)	2021	Non-album single
"Forgetaboutyou" (Eda Pollo featuring Alice Ivy)	2025	Non-album single

=== Remixes ===
List of official remixes, with year released and original artist(s) shown
Title	Year	Artist(s)	Peak chart positions
Title	Year	Artist(s)	AUS
"Float"	2016	Thomston	—
"Beat the Keeper"	2017	Taj Ralph	—
"Kate's Bed"	2017	Huntly	—
"West"	2017	Lakyn	—
"Life Goes On"	2017	E^ST	—
"Panopticon"	2018	Cloud Control	—
"Lady Powers"	2018	Vera Blue	—
"Clothes I Slept In"	2018	Luca Brasi	—
"Real Love"	2018	Flint Eastwood	—
"DeLorean"	2019	Amwin	—
"Fooling Around"	2019	Japanese Wallpaper	—
"Parties"	2020	Elizabeth	—
"The Fool"	2020	Overcoats	—
"Homecoming Queen"	2020	Thelma Plum	—
"Stuck In A Bubble"	2020	George Alice	—
"Life in Live"	2020	The Rubens	—
"Voices In My Head"	2021	Ex-Olympian	—
"River"	2021	Pnau	— (Note: "River" (Alice Ivy remix) did not enter the Australian Top 100 Singles Chart but did peak at number 14 on the Top 50 Club Tracks Chart.)

=== Music videos ===
Song	Year	Director
"Touch"	2016	James Thompson; Bill Presser
"Be Friends"	2017	Unknown
"Close to You" (featuring Flint Eastwood)	2019	Alice Ivy; Sam Rankin
"In My Mind" (featuring Ecca Vandal)	2019	Claudia Sangiorgi Dallimore
"Sunrise" (featuring Cadence Weapon)	2019	Harry Deadman
"Don't Sleep" (featuring Imbi the Girl & Boi)	2020	May Tusler
"Weakness" (with Sycco)	2021	Dom Gould

== Awards and nominations ==
=== AIR Awards ===
The Australian Independent Record Awards (commonly known informally as AIR Awards) is an annual awards night to recognise, promote and celebrate the success of Australia's Independent Music sector.

Year	Nominee / work	Award	Result	Ref.
2022	"Weakness" (with Sycco)	Best Independent Dance, Electronica or Club Single	Nominated	
2025	"Do I Need To Know What Love Is?" (featuring Josh Teskey)	Independent Song of the Year	Nominated	
2025	"Do I Need To Know What Love Is?" (featuring Josh Teskey)	Best Independent Dance, Electronica or Club Single	Won	
2025	Do What Makes You Happy	Best Independent Dance or Electronica Album or EP	Won	
2025	Alice Ivy for Do What Makes You Happy	Independent Producer of the Year	Won	

=== ARIA Music Awards ===
The ARIA Music Awards is an annual awards ceremony that recognises excellence, innovation, and achievement across all genres of Australian music. Ivy has received 2 nominations.

Year	Nominee / work	Award	Result	Ref.
2020	Don't Sleep	Best Dance Release	Nominated	
2020	Alice Ivy for Don't Sleep	Engineer of the Year	Nominated	
2025	Alice Ivy for Alice Ivy – Do What Makes You Happy	Engineer of the Year	Nominated	

=== Australian Music Prize ===
The Australian Music Prize (the AMP) is an annual award of $30,000 given to an Australian band or solo artist in recognition of the merit of an album released during the year of award. They commenced in 2005.

Year	Nominee / work	Award	Result	Ref.
2020	Don't Sleep	Album of the Year	Nominated	

=== Australian Women in Music Awards ===
The Australian Women in Music Awards is an annual event that celebrates outstanding women in the Australian Music Industry who have made significant and lasting contributions in their chosen field. They commenced in 2018.

Year	Nominee / work	Award	Result	Ref.
2021	Alice Ivy	Diversity in Music Award	Nominated	
2021	Alice Ivy	Studio Production Award	Won	
2024	Alice Ivy	Songwriter Award	Won	

=== J Awards ===
The J Awards are an annual series of Australian music awards that were established by the Australian Broadcasting Corporation's youth-focused radio station Triple J. They commenced in 2005.

Year	Nominee / work	Award	Result	Ref.
2020	Don't Sleep	Australian Album of the Year	Nominated	

=== MPEG Awards ===
The Music Producer and Engineers’ Guild (MPEG Awards) Awards celebrate excellence in music production and engineering in Australia. They commenced in 2024.

Year	Nominee / work	Award	Result (wins only)	Ref.
2025	Alice Ivy	Self-Producing Artist of the Year	Won	
2026	Alice Ivy	Producer of the Year	Won	

=== Music Victoria Awards ===
The Music Victoria Awards, are an annual awards night celebrating Victorian music. They commenced in 2005.

Year	Nominee / work	Award	Result	Ref.
2016	Alice Ivy	Best Emerging Artist	Nominated	
2018	Alice Ivy	Best Electronic Act	Nominated	
2020	Alice Ivy	Best Producer	Nominated	
2021	Alice Ivy	Best Producer	Nominated	
2021	Alice Ivy	Best Solo Artist	Nominated	]
2021	Alice Ivy	Best Pop Act	Nominated	]
2021	Don't Sleep	Best Victorian Album	Nominated	]
2022	Alice Ivy	Best Producer	Won	

=== National Live Music Awards ===
The National Live Music Awards (NLMAs) are a broad recognition of Australia's diverse live industry, celebrating the success of the Australian live scene. The awards commenced in 2016.

Year	Nominee / work	Award	Result	Ref.
2018	Alice Ivy	Live Electronic Act (or DJ) of the Year	Nominated	
2020	Alice Ivy	Victorian Live Act of the Year	Nominated	
