= Nudie Jeans =

Swedish denim brand

- Company type: Private
- Industry: Fashion
- Founded: 2001
- Founder: Maria Erixon Levin Joakim Levin
- Headquarters: Gothenburg, Sweden
- Key people: Maria Erixon, creative director Joakim Levin
- Revenue: ▲MSEK 489.4 (2019); MSEK 448.4 (2018)
- Number of employees: 199 (2021)
- Parent: Svenska Jeans Holding AB
- Website: www.nudiejeans.com

Nudie Jeans is a Swedish denim brand founded in 2001 by Maria Erixon and headquartered in Gothenburg. Its parent company is Svenska Jeans Holding. The company repairs more than 65,000 pairs of its jeans annually at its stores.

== History ==
Maria Erixon founded Nudie Jeans with Joakim Levin, her husband at the time, in 2001. Erixon has stated that she is drawn to designing jeans because "the more you wear and repair jeans, the more character they have. Denim is a living fabric that changes over time – and they are for everyone, of all ages and genders".

== Business practices ==
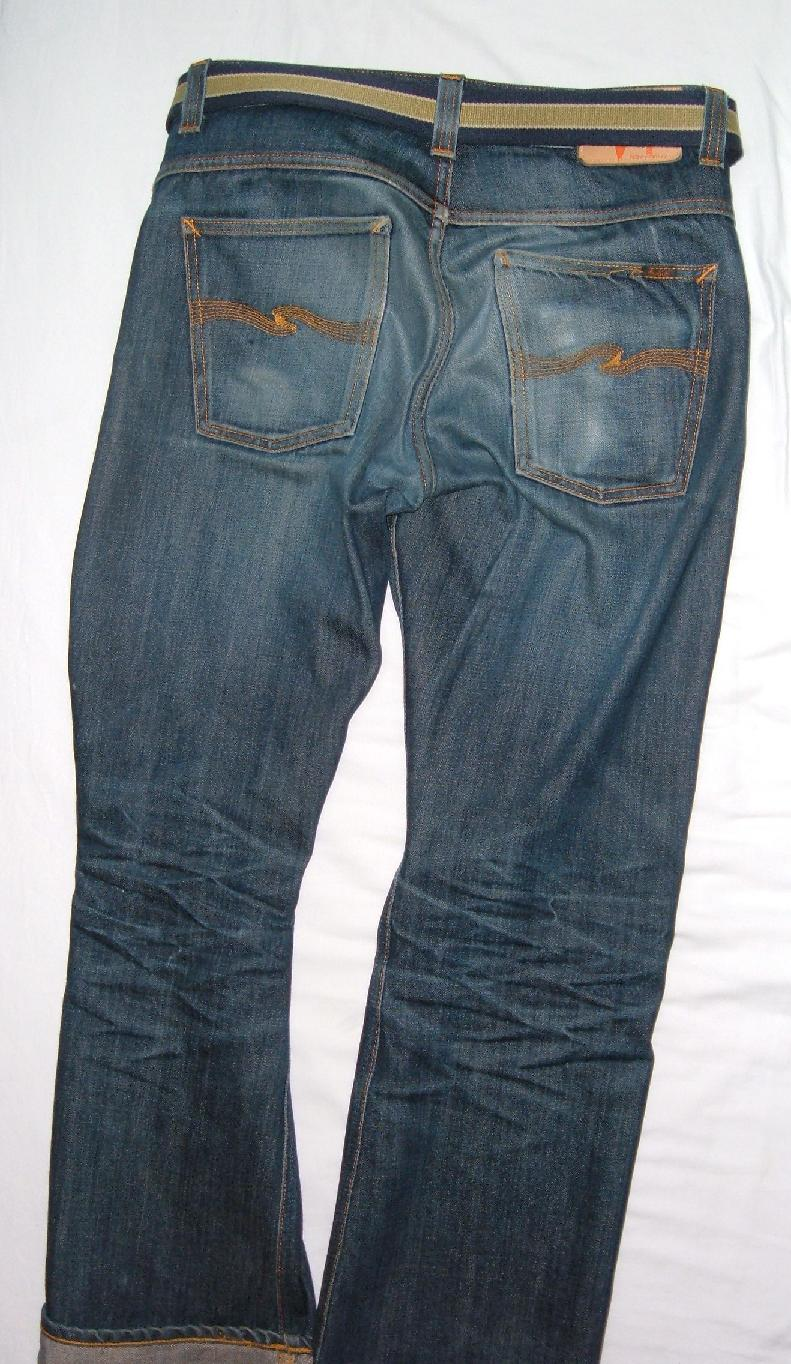
A pair of Nudie Jeans.

Nudie Jeans have prioritised sustainability and social responsibility in their business practices. The company switched to organic cotton in the 2010s and offers free repairs to customers. The company also recycles some old products. The company has a goal of being a fully transparent company.

In 2024, Nudie Jeans repaired more than 68,000 pairs of jeans and collected close to 20,000 pre-owned pairs of jeans, going on to resell 3,500 as second-hand in its own store, with the remainder recycled into new products.

The company's cotton is sourced from India, Turkey and Italy, and manufacturing primarily takes place in Italy. According to CEO Palle Stenberg, its garment workers are paid a living wage. It has stores in Sweden, Norway, the UK, Australia, New Zealand, Japan, Spain, Germany and Switzerland.

== Finances ==
As of 2003, the company had 12 employees, revenue of 93 million Swedish kronor ($11.5 million US dollars) and a net income of 13.6 million kronor ($1.68 million US dollars). 70% of revenue was generated outside of Sweden. In 2004, Nudie's net income increased by 70%.

In 2019, Nudie Jeans increased its net revenue to 489.4 million SEK ($51.74 million US dollars). In 2021, the number of global employees was 199 people.

== See also ==
- 2010s in fashion
