= I'm Dreaming (album) =

2018 album by Alice Ivy

Studio album by Alice Ivy
- Released: 9 February 2018
- Genre: Chillwave; downtempo; electronic
- Length: 36:16
- Label: Dew Process^{AUS}; Last Gang^{WW}
- Producer: Annika Schmarsel

Alice Ivy chronology
I'm Dreaming (2018)	Don't Sleep (2020)

Singles from I'm Dreaming
- 1. "Charlie" Released: 3 January 2015; 2. "Touch" Released: 25 January 2016; 3. "Almost Here" Released: 23 June 2016; 4. "Get Me a Drink" Released: 9 March 2017; 5. "Be Friends" Released: 22 September 2017

I'm Dreaming is the debut studio album by Australian electronic musician and producer Alice Ivy, released on 9 February 2018 by Dew Process in Australia and New Zealand and by Last Gang Records internationally. It was written, composed, and produced by Alice Ivy under her real name; Annika Schmarsel.

== Background and promotion ==
The album contains many of Alice Ivy's previously released standalone singles. "Charlie" featuring Georgia van Etten, originally released on 3 January 2015. The second single "Touch" also featuring van Etten, originally released on 25 January 2016 with its music video later released in February. The third single, "Almost Here" featuring RaRa, was originally released on 23 June 2016. The fourth single, "Get Me a Drink" featuring E^ST and Charlie Threads, was originally released on 9 March 2017. The fifth and final single, "Be Friends" featuring Cazeaux O.S.L.O. and Tim De Cotta, was released on 22 September 2017.

From February to March 2018, Alice Ivy performed an eight date headline tour to promote her debut album. On all East Coast dates, Alice Ivy was accompanied by Melbourne soul artist Nasty Mars, with local opening slots going to Oh Boy, Keelan Mak, François, Sophiegrophy, Strictface & Skivvybeats.

== Writing and composition ==
All songs on the album were written by Alice Ivy herself. The album is supported by many guest vocalists including; Georgia van Etten, Cazeaux O.S.L.O., Tim De Cotta, Bertie Blackman, RaRa, E^ST, and Charlie Threads. The track "Touch" contains samples from the 1951 Alice in Wonderland film. The track "Charlie" contains soundbites from various television commercials from the 1950s. The track "Chasing Stars" tells the story of "Lincoln Beachey, the first person to do a loop to loop in an airplane. The music has many layers which depict the endless landscape of the sky."

The album's genre has been described as chillwave, downtempo, electronic, while also incorporating elements of plunderphonics, neo-psychedelia, nu jazz, big beat, and hip hop.

== Critical reception ==
Professional ratings
Review scores
Source	Rating
Altmedia	3.5/5 stars
Beat	9/10
LunchBox	4/5
Sungenre	3.5/5 stars

The album received positive reviews. LunchBox rated the album 4/5 and said: "It is easy to be taken away into a tranquil state of mind when listening to this record." Rating the album positively, Sarah Pritchard from Altmedia said: "Alice Ivy's debut is a creative triumph and an example of how not to lose heart when surrounded by too much choice, the album is the result of a discerning, musically trained mind." Paul Waxman of Beat rated it positively, saying: "Alice Ivy's impressive debut really is a dream, each track taking the listener to a new but familiar place. And like every good dream, you feel sad once it's over." Sungenre, in a positive review said: "I'm Dreaming is an impressive effort from an all-in-one breakout producer who should be monitored closely."

== Track listing ==
No.	Title	Length
1.	"Touch" (featuring Georgia van Etten)	4:26
2.	"Be Friends" (featuring Cazeaux O.S.L.O. & Tim De Cotta)	3:22
3.	"Chasing Stars" (featuring Bertie Blackman)	3:40
4.	"St. Germain"	1:43
5.	"Charlie"	4:13
6.	"Bella"	3:31
7.	"Almost Here" (featuring RaRa)	4:00
8.	"Get Me a Drink" (featuring E^ST & Charlie Threads)	3:56
9.	"St. Germain II"	0:50
10.	"I'm Dreaming" (featuring Georgia van Etten)	3:38
11.	"Kaya High"	2:57
Total length:		36:16

Notes

- Georgia van Etten is featured in "Charlie" but is only credited on the single's SoundCloud page, not in the track's title.

== Personnel ==
Credits adapted from SoundCloud.

=== Musicians ===
- Annika Schmarsel - guitar, vocals, mixing, mastering, writing, producer (1–11)

Additional musicians

- Georgia van Etten – vocals ( 1, 5, 10)
- Cazeaux O.S.L.O. – vocals (2)
- Tim de Cotta – vocals (2)
- Bertie Blackman – vocals (3)
- RaRa – vocals (7)
- E^ST – vocals (8)
- Charlie Threads – vocals (8)
- Connor Black Harry – backing vocals (8)
- Luy Amiel – guitar (7)
- Sam Dowson – drums (7)

=== Technical ===
- Ben Coe – mastering (1, 5, 7)
- Phil Threlfall – mixing (7)
- Cam Bluff – mixing (8)
- Simon Lam – mastering (8)

== Release history ==
Release history and formats for I'm Dreaming
Region	Date	Label	Format	Catalogue	Ref.
Various	9 February 2018	Alice Ivy, Dew Process	Digital download; streaming	Not applicable	
Australia	9 March 2018	Dew Process	LP	DEW9001031	
Various	11 May 2018	Last Gang Records	LP	LGAN9790	
