= Our Thickness =

Studio album by the Russian Futurists
- Released: 3 May 2005
- Genres: Synth-pop, indie rock, indie pop, indietronica, alternative rock
- Label: Upper Class Recordings
- Producer: Matthew Adam Hart

The Russian Futurists chronology
Let's Get Ready to Crumble (2002)	Our Thickness (2005)	The Weight's on the Wheels (2010)

Professional ratings
Review scores
Source	Rating
AllMusic	link
Pitchfork	7.8/10 link
PopMatters	7/10
Tiny Mix Tapes	link

Our Thickness is the third album by the Russian Futurists.

== Track listing ==
All songs were written by Matthew Adam Hart.

1. "Paul Simon"
2. "Sentiments vs. Syllables"
3. "Our Pen's Out of Ink"
4. "Still Life"
5. "Hurtin' 4 Certain"
6. "Why You Gotta Do That Thang?"
7. "It's Over, It's Nothing"
8. "Incandescent Hearts"
9. "These Seven Notes"
10. "2 Dots on a Map"
