= Cadence Weapon =

Canadian rapper

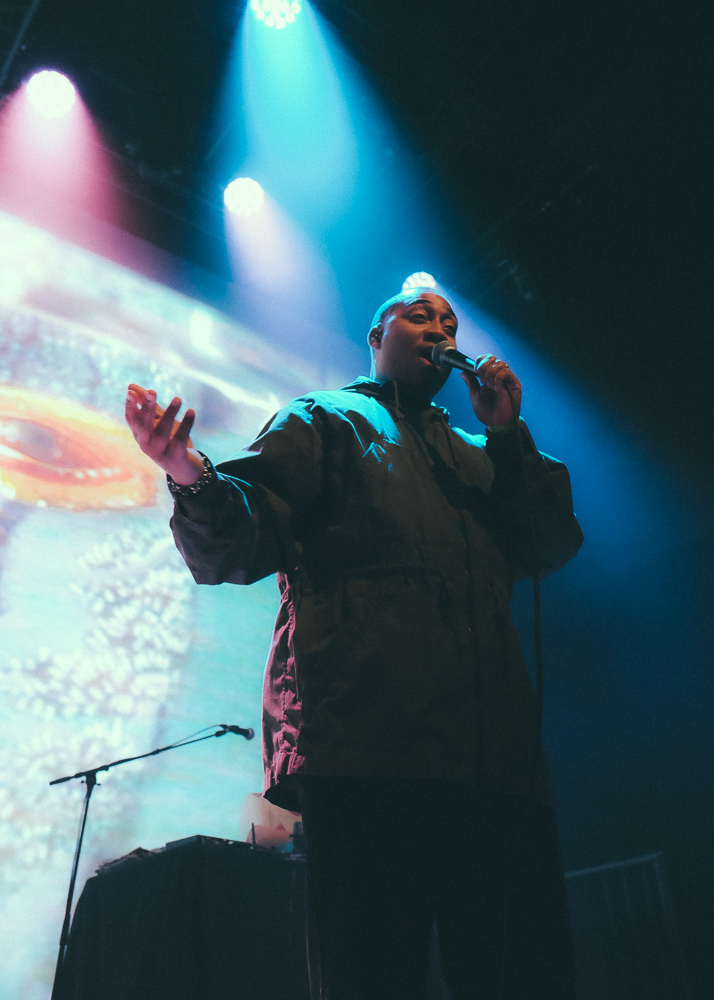

Background information
- Born: Roland Pemberton; February 21, 1986 (age 40); Edmonton, Alberta, Canada
- Genres: Canadian hip-hop; alternative hip-hop
- Occupations: Rapper; record producer; songwriter; author; journalist
- Years active: 2005–present
- Labels: eOne Music Canada; Upper Class Recordings; ANTI-; Big Dada
- Website: cadenceweapon.net

Roland "Rollie" Pemberton (born February 21, 1986), better known by his stage name Cadence Weapon, is a Canadian rapper based in Toronto, Ontario. Born and raised in Edmonton, Alberta, Pemberton released his first album, Breaking Kayfabe, in 2005 with positive reviews. He subsequently signed with the American record label ANTI-, releasing the albums Afterparty Babies in 2008 and Hope in Dirt City in 2012. In 2009, Cadence Weapon was named Edmonton's Poet Laureate.

== Biography ==
Born and raised in Edmonton, Alberta, his father was Teddy Pemberton, a pioneering hip-hop DJ on CJSR-FM, and his grandfather was Rollie Miles, a football player for the Edmonton Eskimos. He began rapping at age 13, and following high school he briefly attended journalism school, dropping out soon afterward to concentrate on music. He released the mixtape Cadence Weapon Is the Black Hand in 2005, and his full-length debut Breaking Kayfabe at the end of the year.

Breaking Kayfabe garnered strong reviews in Canadian, American and British media, and Cadence toured extensively to support the disc, including concerts across Canada and three shows in Austin, Texas, at the 2006 South by Southwest festival. Chart magazine named Cadence Weapon one of the 15 Canadian artists to watch in 2006. In addition, the composite review site Metacritic listed Breaking Kayfabe as one of the best albums of 2006.

Cadence described his inspiration to pursue a career in music: "It was around me all the time when I was growing up, my dad was a DJ, and he would play all sorts of stuff around the house, Hip hop, electro, funk and my mum would play piano. And I suppose I just randomly got into rapping. I remember rapping in math class, I failed maths, but I suppose I did OK in other things." Cadence has said that he is inspired by dance music: "I'm a big Basement Jaxx fan. I like the way their music sounds, really like it's a party happening. It sounds really organic and super-tech. Switch. Obviously Daft Punk. I'm into very European stuff. I like some of the Ed Banger stuff. Dubsided Records." In addition to his own recordings, Cadence Weapon has also remixed tracks for Lady Sovereign and Ciara, and has written hiphop reviews for Stylus Magazine and Pitchfork Media.

Cadence Weapon was nominated for the 2006 Polaris Music Prize, which awards $20,000 for the Canadian album of the year. However, he lost to Owen Pallett's He Poos Clouds. Coincidentally, the Toronto alternative newspaper Eye Weekly's cover photograph the Thursday before the award was presented featured both Cadence and Pallett adopting a mock confrontational pose. The accompanying article, in fact, revealed that Cadence and Pallett had become friends and both really admired each other's records. Cadence and Pallett also performed together on the CBC Radio concert series Fuse in April 2007. He has also been a guest performer on music by other artists, including Super Extra Bonus Party's "Radar" and Shout Out Out Out Out's "Coming Home".

On February 21, 2007, Pemberton announced that he signed an American record deal with Epitaph Records sublabel ANTI-, a move that would give him greater exposure in the United States. As a part of his new deal, Breaking Kayfabe was released in the US on March 13, 2007. In the fall of 2007, Big Dada became Cadence Weapon's representative label in Europe. Cadence Weapon's second LP, Afterparty Babies was released by Anti-/Epitaph on March 4, 2008. In 2008, he also played at ZXZW in the Netherlands.

On May 26, 2009, Cadence Weapon was sworn in as Edmonton's Poet Laureate for a two-year term beginning July 1, 2009, and as such served as an ambassador of the literary arts, as well as creating original works.

In 2011, he participated in the National Parks Project, collaborating with musicians Laura Barrett and Mark Hamilton and filmmaker Peter Lynch to produce and score a short film about Alberta's Waterton Lakes National Park.

Cadence Weapon released the album Hope in Dirt City on May 29, 2012. The album became his third straight to be nominated for the Polaris Music Prize, and the second to make the short list. Jesse Kinos-Goodin and Noah Love, writing for the National Post, said "Drake may be Canada’s most commercially successful rapper, but Rollie Pemberton, a.k.a. Cadence Weapon, is definitely its most creative." Hope in Dirt City was shortlisted as one of their best of albums thus far of 2012.

His first book Magnetic Days was published by Metatron in 2014. In 2015, Cadence Weapon began a residency on Toronto Independent Radio Station TRP called Allsorts.

Cadence Weapon released a self-titled album in 2018. His fifth studio album, Parallel World, was released on April 30, 2021, and won the 2021 Polaris Music Prize on September 27, 2021. He described the concept as being told with a "journalistic lens" that was largely inspired by watching the George Floyd protests in 2020.

In 2022 his second book, Bedroom Rapper: Cadence Weapon on Hip Hop, Resistance and Surviving the Music Industry, was published by McClelland & Stewart.

His album Forager was released on April 24, 2026. The album was written alongside his third book, entitled Ways of Listening. The song "Step Out", a collaboration with Junia-T and DijahSB, was longlisted for the 2026 SOCAN Polaris Song Prize.

== Personal life ==
Pemberton was based in Montreal for a period of six years in his twenties, which led to collaborations with artists such as Blue Hawaii and Jacques Greene. In 2015, Pemberton relocated to Toronto, which provided inspiration for his 2018 song, "High Rise," which addresses gentrification.

== Discography ==
=== Studio albums ===
- Breaking Kayfabe (2005)
- Afterparty Babies (2008)
- Hope in Dirt City (2012)
- Cadence Weapon (2018)
- Parallel World (2021)
- Rollercoaster (2024)
- Forager (2026)

=== Mixtapes ===
- Cadence Weapon Is the Black Hand (2005)
- Separation Anxiety (2009)
- Tron Legacy: The Mixtape (2010)

=== Singles ===
- "House Music" (2008)
- "Conditioning" (2012)
- "When It's Real" (2013)

=== Guest appearances ===
- Antimc - "Canadian Dream" from It's Free, But It's Not Cheap (2006)
- Buck 65 - "Benz." from Situation (2007)
- Noah23 - "Half Drunk" from Rock Paper Scissors (2008)
- Dragon Fli Empire - "Outside Inn" from Redefine (2009)
- Shout Out Out Out Out - "Coming Home" from Reintegration Time (2009)
- B. Dolan - "Fall of T.R.O.Y." from Fallen House, Sunken City (2010)
- The Hood Internet - "Critical Captions" from FEAT (2012)
- Shad + Skratch Bastid - "Homie" from The Spring Up (2013)
- The Voltage Heroes - "The Eagles" from This is Our City (2016)
- Jacques Greene - "Night Service" from Dawn Chorus (2019)
- Alice Ivy - "Sunrise" from Don't Sleep (2020)
- Hot Chip - "The Evil That Men Do" from Freakout/Release (2022)
- Low End Activist - "Superhighway" from Hostile Utopia (2022)

=== Productions ===
- Think About Life - "Sweet Sixteen (Cadence Weapon Remix)" (2010)
- Liars - "Brats (Cadence Weapon Remix)" (2012)
