= 2006 Polaris Music Prize =

Annual Canadian music award

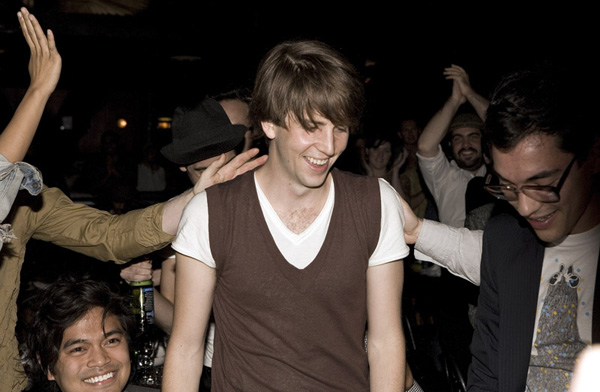
Final Fantasy at the 2006 Polaris Music Prize gala

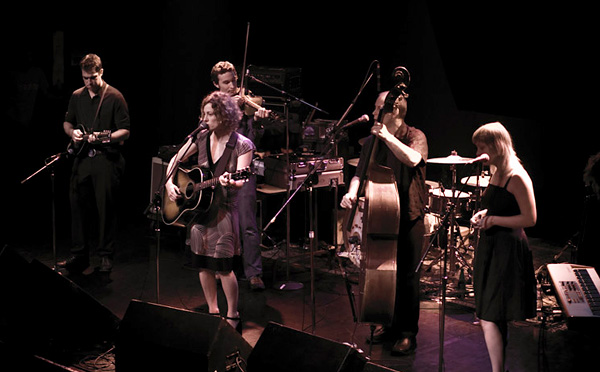
Sarah Harmer at the 2006 Polaris Music Prize gala

The inaugural edition of the Canadian Polaris Music Prize presented on September 18, 2006, at Toronto's Phoenix Concert Theatre. The winning album was Final Fantasy's He Poos Clouds.

== Nominees ==
The prize's list of 10 finalist albums, chosen from an initial list of 165 nominees, was announced on July 4.

- Final Fantasy, He Poos Clouds
- Broken Social Scene, Broken Social Scene
- Cadence Weapon, Breaking Kayfabe
- The Deadly Snakes, Porcella
- Sarah Harmer, I'm a Mountain
- K'naan, The Dusty Foot Philosopher
- Malajube, Trompe-l'oeil
- Metric, Live It Out
- The New Pornographers, Twin Cinema
- Wolf Parade, Apologies to the Queen Mary

== Album ==
2006 Polaris Music Prize

Compilation album by Various artists
- Released: 2006

Various artists chronology
2006 Polaris Music Prize (2006)	2007 Polaris Music Prize (2007)

A compilation album featuring tracks from the ten nominated albums was also released.

=== Track listing ===
1. Broken Social Scene, "Fire Eye'd Boy"
2. Cadence Weapon, "Black Hand"
3. The Deadly Snakes, "Gore Veil"
4. Final Fantasy, "This Lamb Sells Condos"
5. Sarah Harmer, "Goin' Out"
6. K'naan, "Soobax"
7. Malajube, "Pâte filo"
8. Metric, "The Police and the Private"
9. The New Pornographers, "Sing Me Spanish Techno"
10. Wolf Parade, "Shine a Light"
