= Maxwell McCabe-Lokos =

Canadian actor, musician (b. 1978)

Maxwell McCabe-Lokos (born 1978) is a Canadian actor, screenwriter, director, and musician.

== Career ==
McCabe-Lokos has appeared in Land of the Dead, Lars and the Real Girl, The Incredible Hulk, Chaos Walking, The Husband (also screenwriter), and Antibirth. He has appeared in supporting or guest roles in the television series Happy Town, Being Erica, The Listener, Schitt's Creek, Copper, Lucky 7, and Station Eleven.

McCabe-Lokos directed the short films Ape Sodom and Midnight Confession and the feature film Stanleyville, co-written with Rob Benvie.

He was previously a keyboardist for the garage rock band the Deadly Snakes, in which he was known by the stage name Age of Danger. McCabe-Lokos told Damian Abraham on Abraham's 'Turned Out a Punk' podcast that GG Allin and the Murder Junkies was the first band he ever saw live.

== Personal life ==
He currently resides in Tangier, Morocco and is neighbours with Bernard-Henri Lévy.

== Filmography ==
=== Film ===
Year	Title	Role	Notes
2003	Twist	Noah	
2005	Land of the Dead	Mouse	
2005	Mouth to Mouth	Mad Ax	
2005	The Man	Pinto Driver	
2006	The Sentinel	Store Clerk	
2007	The Tracey Fragments	Lance	
2007	This Beautiful City	Attendant	
2007	Lars and the Real Girl	Kurt	
2008	The Incredible Hulk	Cab Driver	
2008	Toronto Stories	Eddi	
2008	Max Payne	Doug	
2013	The Husband	Henry Andreas	
2014	Wolves	Morrow	
2015	Pay the Ghost	Mr. Moldanado	Uncredited
2016	Antibirth	Warren	
2016	The Other Half	Maitre D'	Uncredited
2019	Disappearance at Clifton Hill	Gerry	
2020	Falling	Eddie	
2021	Chaos Walking	Prentisstown Man #1	
2022	The Switch (La Switch)	Dick	
2023	Red Rooms (Les chambres rouges)	Ludovic Chevalier	

=== Television ===
Year	Title	Role	Notes
2003	Blue Murder	Nicholas Richards	Episode: "Speed Demons"
2003	Street Time	The Cooker	Episode: "Anger Management"
2003	Deathlands	Jabez Pendragon Cawdor	Television film
2009	Being Erica	Bodyguard	Episode: "Erica the Vampire Slayer"
2009	Sea Wolf	Smoke	2 episodes
2010	Happy Town	Lincoln Stiviletto	7 episodes
2012	The Listener	Charlie Enzo	Episode: "Poisoned Minds"
2012	Copper	Tungus McClaugherty	Episode: "Husbands and Fathers"
2013	Lucky 7	Eddie	2 episodes
2015	Killjoys	Spider Drakos	Episode: "One Blood"
2015	Murdoch Mysteries	Liam Bertram	Episode: "The Local Option"
2016	The Girlfriend Experience	Client	Episode: "Separation"
2016	12 Monkeys	Reginald	2 episodes
2017	Schitt's Creek	Cal	Episode: "Opening Night"
2017–2019	Tin Star	Danny Lyle Jr.	5 episodes
2019	Wayne	Eric	2 episodes
2020	In the Dark	Cyrus	Episode: "The Truth Hurts"
2021	Y: The Last Man	Rafe	Episode: "The Day Before"
2021–2022	Station Eleven	Vlad	10 episodes
