= Ohmega Watts =

American rapper

- Born: Milton Campbell
- Origin: Brooklyn, United States
- Genres: Hip hop
- Years active: 2004-present
- Labels: Ubiquity Records; Tres Records; Mellow Orange

Ohmega Watts, real name Milton Campbell, is an American hip hop producer and vocalist from Brooklyn, New York. He releases music under the name Ohmega Watts and as a part of the Lightheaded crew.

== Biography ==
Campbell was born and raised in Brooklyn, New York, by West Indian parents from Jamaica. He lived in Brooklyn for eight years before moving to Laurelton, Queens, New York.

He grew up listening to many types of music including reggae, calypso, soca, death metal, 80's pop and hip-hop, but only started to take a serious interest in music when he was around 11 years old. He gravitated towards hip-hop, listening to "Golden Age" artists including Run–D.M.C., LL Cool J, Big Daddy Kane, Dana Dane, BDP, Eric B. and Rakim, Pete Rock and CL Smooth and Gang Starr, but the artists who influenced him the most sonically / production wise were artists in the Native Tongues Posse, such as A Tribe Called Quest, Jungle Brothers, De La Soul, and Black Sheep.

Ohmega Watts' first release was “A Request”, a soulful and DJ-friendly solo 12" featuring his group Lightheaded and, former hip hop trio, The Procussions. “A Request” received praise from respected DJs, including Mr. Scruff, Gilles Peterson, Greyboy, and the Los Angeles–based Heavyweight Record Pool. Ohmega Watts' sound was compared to the playfulness of Digital Underground and big drums and chopped samples from the likes of Pete Rock.

A record deal with Ubiquity Records was signed shortly after this first release. Ohmega Watts' first solo album, "The Find", was released on Ubiquity in 2005.

Producing since 1997 and MCing since 1993, Ohmega Watts' resume includes tracks produced for Mars Ill on Ill Boogie, for Listener on Mush, plus he’s recorded as Lightheaded for Day By Day Ent, and as Return To Sender on the Piece of The Action compilation.

Hailing from Flatbush, Brooklyn, Campbell moved to Florida for college and then settled in Portland, Oregon. He is now part of a bustling Northwest independent scene that includes the Lifesavas, Boom Bap, Soul Plasma, DJ and MC, Libretto, Lightheaded and The Blacknotes.

He has produced for Beautiful Eulogy and also produced the entire Half Dead EP by Cataphant.

== Discography ==
=== LPs ===
- The Find (2005, Ubiquity Records)
- Watts Happening (2007, Ubiquity Records)
- Pieces of a Dream (Sept 2013, Mellow Orange)
