= Touch and Nato =

- Origin: Edmonton, Alberta, Canada
- Genre: Canadian hip hop
- Years active: 2005–present
- Labels: Up in Arms Recordings; Makebelieve Records
- Members: Touch; Nato
- Website: Touch and Nato

Touch and Nato are a Canadian hip hop duo from Edmonton, Alberta. The members are Touch (MC), and Nato (DJ/producer).

== History ==
The group's debut album, ...Are The Representatives in Intelligent Design, was released in June 2007 to positive reviews from HeroHill.com and Now Magazine and HipHopCanada. It featured collaborations with Cadence Weapon, Wordsworth, Mindbender, Nomad, Chazm, Chris Plus and Stray. Production was handled by Nato and it was recorded at his Up in Arms Studio.

Their online video for the song "Adult's Story" included Touch spinning the classic Slick Rick song "Children's Story" into a Maury Povich-inspired talk show paternity battle. The album reached number one on the hip hop charts for ChartAttack in August 2007, and was 10th overall for the year, reflecting Canadian campus radio airplay. In early 2008, the single "Somethin' Real" ft. Wordsworth reached number one on the US-based Rap Attack charts, and also charted on CMJ's Hip Hop Top 20. Intelligent Design was also nominated for Outstanding Urban Recording at the 2008 Western Canadian Music Awards.

== Members ==
- Touch - MC
- Nato - DJ/producer

== Discography ==
- Intelligent Design Promo - 2007 - Up in Arms Recordings (digital mixtape)
- ...Are the Representatives in Intelligent Design - 2007 - Up in Arms Recordings/Makebelieve Records

=== Vinyl releases ===
- Abstrakt Vinyl Compilation - 2005 - Makebelieve Records (features "What I Wanna Say")
