= 2025 in Canadian music =

The following musical events and releases that happened in 2025 in Canada.

== Notable events ==
- March - The East Coast Music Association faces backlash from some members over the sudden firing of its CEO and concerns from some over a lack of transparency.
- March 7 - Following the controversy around singer-songwriter Buffy Sainte-Marie's long-claimed indigenous Canadian heritage, both the Juno Awards and the Polaris Music Prize revoke awards that she had previously won. She is also removed from the Canadian Music Hall of Fame.
- March 30 - Tate McRae is the leading winner at the Juno Awards of 2025 where Anne Murray received a lifetime achievement award.
- April 6 - 20th Canadian Folk Music Awards
- May 13 - Jacob Lewis, a singer from Butlerville, Newfoundland and Labrador, wins the fifth season of Canada's Got Talent.
- June 10 - Alongside the announcement of the initial longlist for the 2025 Polaris Music Prize, the Polaris committee and SOCAN announce the creation of a new prize for individual songs, replacing the former SOCAN Songwriting Prize. The main Polaris album prize also drops in value from $50,000 to $30,000.
- September 13 - 2025 Canadian Country Music Association Awards
- September 16 - Yves Jarvis wins the 2025 Polaris Music Prize for his album All Cylinders. The new Polaris SOCAN Song Prize is won by Mustafa for "Gaza Is Calling", while the Heritage Prize is won by The Organ for Grab That Gun (public vote), and Jane Siberry for The Speckless Sky (jury vote).

=== Dates TBA ===
- Prism Prize
- 47th Félix Awards

== Albums released ==
=== A ===
- Bryan Adams, Roll with the Punches - August 29
- Alexisonfire, Copies of Old Masters Volume 1 - November 7
- Naya Ali, We Did the Damn Thing - February 7
- Laura Anglade, Get Out of Town
- Aqyila, Falling Into Place - March 28
- Arcade Fire, Pink Elephant - May 9
- Ardn, Keep Your Eye on the Sparrow
- Rich Aucoin, Synthetic Season 4 - October 30
- Austra, Chin Up Buttercup - November 14
- Aysanabee, Edge of the Earth - June 20

=== B ===
- Backxwash, Only Dust Remains - March 28
- Bahamas, My Second Last Album - October 24
- Jill Barber, A Holly Jolly Jill Barber - November 21
- Quinton Barnes, CODE NOIR - January 10
- Quinton Barnes, BLACK NOISE - June 6
- The Barr Brothers, Let It Hiss - October 17
- bbno$, bbno$ - October 17
- The Beaches, No Hard Feelings - August 29
- The Besnard Lakes, The Besnard Lakes Are the Ghost Nation - October 10
- Justin Bieber, Swag - July 11
- Justin Bieber, Swag II - September 5
- Big Wreck, The Rest of the Story - October 24
- The Birthday Massacre, Pathways - April 11
- Black Atlass, Seven - June 4
- Jason Blaine, Russham Road - August 29
- Blond:ish, Never Walk Alone - February 14
- The Blue Stones, Metro - March 28
- Bob Moses, Blink - October 17
- John Borra, Last Dance at the E Room - October 24
- The Bros. Landreth, Dog Ear - November 14
- Basia Bulat, Basia's Palace - February 21
- The Burning Hell, Ghost Palace - March 7

=== C ===
- Daniel Caesar, Son of Spergy - October 24
- Alessia Cara, Love & Hyperbole - February 14
- Casper Skulls, Kit-Cat - April 11
- Change of Heart, In the Wreckage - March 4
- Choclair, Transit Music - November 28
- Choses Sauvages, Choses Sauvages III - March 28
- Cleopatrick, Fake Moon - March 14
- Cold Specks, Light for the Midnight - April 9
- Rose Cousins, Conditions of Love, Vol. 1 - March 14
- Alex Cuba, Indole - November 7

=== D ===
- The Damn Truth, The Damn Truth
- Marie Davidson, City of Clowns - February 28
- The Dears, Life Is Beautiful! Life Is Beautiful! Life Is Beautiful! - November 7
- Art d'Ecco, Serene Demon - February 14
- The Deep Dark Woods, The Circle Remains - October 3
- Mac DeMarco, Guitar - August 22
- Cris Derksen, The Visit - November 6
- Destroyer, Dan's Boogie - March 28
- Digawolf, Trapline - April 25
- The Dirty Nil, The Lash - July 25
- Peter Dreams, Peter Dreams and MOONRIIVR - February 14
- Marc Dupré, Parce que ce soir - November 14

=== E ===
- Kathleen Edwards, Billionaire - August 22

=== F ===
- Stephen Fearing, The Empathist - March 13
- Finger Eleven, Last Night on Earth - November 7
- Foxwarren, 2 - May 30
- Debby Friday, The Starrr of the Queen of Life - August 1

=== G ===
- Garou, Un meilleur lendemain - April 4
- Sebastian Gaskin, Lovechild - February 21
- Ghetto Concept, Legendary - November 7
- Gloin, all of your anger is actually shame (and I bet that makes you angry) - March 28
- Matthew Good, Zero Hours - September 26
- Great Lake Swimmers, Caught Light - October 10
- Tom Green, Home to the Country - January 24

=== H ===
- Georgia Harmer, Eye of the Storm - August 15
- Hotel Mira, The After Party - November 6

=== J ===
- James Barker Band, One of Us - September 5
- Yves Jarvis, All Cylinders - February 28
- Jelleestone, Original Rude Boy - December 22
- Jets Overhead, Ordinary Dreamers: Rarities and Demos Volume 1 - November 7
- Jutes, Dilworth - December 3

=== K ===
- Peter Katz, Everything Unfolding - November 7
- Kaytranada, Ain't No Damn Way! - August 15
- Brett Kissel, Let Your Horses Run – The Album - February 28

=== L ===
- Pierre Lapointe, Dix chansons démodées pour ceux qui ont le cœur abîmé - January 25
- Bells Larsen, Blurring Time - April 25
- Ada Lea, When I Paint My Masterpiece - August 8
- Catherine Leduc, Les jours où il neige à tous les postes
- Jade LeMac, It's Always at Night - November 7
- Lights, A6 - May 2
- Isabella Lovestory, Vanity - June 27
- The Lowest of the Low, Over Years and Overnight - May 2

=== M ===
- Kate Maki, Impossible Knot - May 9
- Dan Mangan, Natural Light - May 16
- Mappe Of, Afterglades - September 19
- Cory Marks, Sorry for Nothing Vol. 2 - October 3
- Mae Martin, I'm a TV - February 27
- Sarah McLachlan, Better Broken - September 19
- Tate McRae, So Close to What - February 21
- Men Without Hats, On the Moon - November 14
- Amy Millan, I Went to Find You - May 30
- Mother Mother, Nostalgia - June 6
- Anne Murray, Here You Are - September 5

=== N ===
- N Nao, Nouveau Langage - January 31
- Nav, OMW2 Rexdale - March 28

=== O ===
- Odonis Odonis, Odonis Odonis - November 14
- Ryan Ofei, Jubilate
- Old Man Luedecke, She Told Me Where to Go - November 14
- Optikz, The Optikz EP - November 7

=== P ===
- PartyNextDoor & Drake, Some Sexy Songs 4 U - February 14
- Jean-François Pauzé, Les amours de seconde main
- Jonathan Personne, Nouveau Monde - March 14
- Lou Phelps, Chèlbè - April 4
- Preoccupations, Ill at Ease - May 9
- William Prince, Further from the Country - October 17
- Propagandhi, At Peace - May 2
- PUP, Who Will Look After the Dogs? - May 2
- Purity Ring, Purity Ring - September 26

=== R ===
- Allan Rayman, #1 Girl - February 28
- Jessie Reyez, Paid in Memories - March 28
- Rheostatics, The Great Lakes Suite - November 21
- Ribbon Skirt, Bite Down - April 11
- Julianna Riolino, Echo in the Dust
- Robert Robert, Boost - October 24
- Josh Ross, Later Tonight - September 19

=== S ===
- Ron Sexsmith, Hangover Terrace - August 29
- Shad, Start Anew - October 31
- The Shuffle Demons, Are You Really Real
- Siibii, Siibii
- Silverstein, Antibloom - February 21
- Silverstein, Pink Moon - September 12
- Sister Ray, Believer - April 4
- Skiifall, Lovers Till I'm Gone - January 10
- Slash Need, Sit & Grin - October 21
- Sloan, Based on the Best Seller - September 26
- John Southworth, The Red Castle
- Spiritbox, Tsunami Sea - March 7

=== T ===
- Tariq, Scroll Before You Sleep - January 24
- Three Days Grace, Alienation - August 22
- Two Hours Traffic, I Never See You Anymore - May 23

=== U ===
- U.S. Girls, Scratch It - June 20

=== V ===
- Jake Vaadeland, One More Dollar to Go – April 25
- Various Artists, Songs from the Gang - April 11
- The Violet Archers, The Duo Sessions - November 7
- Virginia to Vegas, an examination of it all - November 7

=== W ===
- Colter Wall, Memories and Empties - November 14
- Patrick Watson, Uh Oh - September 26
- The Weather Station, Humanhood - January 17
- The Weeknd, Hurry Up Tomorrow - January 31
- Cameron Whitcomb, The Hard Way - September 26
- Royal Wood, Dear John - October 17
- Roy Woods, Dark Nights - April 25

== Deaths ==
- January 24 - Jane McGarrigle, record producer and music manager
- March 23 - Kevan Staples, rock guitarist and songwriter (Rough Trade)
- June 3 - Juliette Powell, former host of Electric Circus
- June 12 - Steven Leckie, punk rock singer (The Viletones)
- June 24 - Serge Fiori, rock singer (Harmonium)
