= 2022 in Canadian music =

The following musical events and releases that happened in 2022 in Canada.

== Events ==
- April 2 – 17th Canadian Folk Music Awards
- May 15 – Juno Awards of 2022
- June 13 – SOCAN Songwriting Prize
- July 8 – Prism Prize
- September 11 – 2022 Canadian Country Music Awards
- September 19 – 2022 Polaris Music Prize
- November 6 – 44th Félix Awards

== Albums released ==
=== # ===
- 88Glam, Close To Heaven Far From God - August 26

=== A ===
- Bryan Adams, So Happy It Hurts - March 11
- Alexisonfire, Otherness - June 24
- Altameda, Born Losers
- Alvvays, Blue Rev - October 7
- Matt Andersen, House To House - March 4
- Laura Anglade, Venez donc chez moi
- Anyway Gang, Still Anyways - May 6
- Apollo Ghosts, Pink Tiger - March 11
- Aquakultre, Don't Trip - July 22
- Arcade Fire, We - May 6
- Arkells, Blink Twice
- Jann Arden, Descendant - January 28
- Art d'Ecco, After the Head Rush
- Shawn Austin, Planes Don't Wait - June 29
- Aysanabee, Watin - November 4, 2022

=== B ===
- Jason Bajada, Crushed Grapes
- Tim Baker, The Festival - October 21
- Adam Baldwin, Concertos & Serenades - September 23
- Matthew Barber, No Singing or Dancing
- Quinton Barnes, For the Love of Drugs
- Alexis Baro, Mi Raiz
- Brad Barr, The Winter Mission - January 21
- Basement Revolver, Embody - February 18
- Bedouin Soundclash, We Will Meet in a Hurricane - October 28
- Daniel Bélanger, Mercure en mai - October 14
- Beppie, Nice to Meet You
- The Besnard Lakes, The Besnard Lakes Are the Prayers for the Death of Fame
- Bibi Club, Le soleil et la mer
- Billy Talent, Crisis of Faith - January 21
- The Birthday Massacre, Fascination - February 18
- Black Atlass, Infinite - August 5
- Jully Black, Three Rocks and a Slingshot - September 23
- Jean-Michel Blais, aubades - February 4
- Blue Hawaii, My Best Friend's House - February 18
- Blue Moon Marquee, Scream, Holler & Howl
- The Blue Stones, Pretty Monster - November 4
- Bob Moses, The Silence in Between - March 4
- John Borra, Cassettes in Common
- Boslen, Gonzo
- Jacob Brodovsky, I Love You and I'm Sorry
- Broken Social Scene, Old Dead Young - January 14
- Mariel Buckley, Everywhere I Used to Be - August 12
- Basia Bulat, The Garden - February 25
- By Divine Right, Otto Motto - September 30

=== C ===
- Lou Canon, Reimagine the Body - January 26
- Charbonneau & Amato, Synth Works Vol. 2 - March 4
- Nuela Charles, TBA
- Tanika Charles, Papillon de Nuit: The Night Butterfly - April 8
- Ramon Chicharron, Destello de estrellas
- Clever Hopes, Artefact
- William Cloutier, On ira
- Jason Collett, Head Full of Wonder - November 4
- Counterparts, A Eulogy for Those Still Here - October 7

=== D ===
- Destroyer, Labyrinthitis - March 25
- Julie Doiron and Dany Placard, Julie & Dany - April 29
- Dragonette, Twennies - October 28
- Drake, Honestly, Nevermind - June 17
- Drake and 21 Savage, Her Loss - November 4
- Dvsn, Working on My Karma - October 28

=== E ===
- Eccodek, Recalibrate - May 20
- Thompson Egbo-Egbo, What Remains and Oddly Familiar, Vol. 1
- Elephant Stone, Le Voyage de M. Lonely dans la lune - February 18
- Andre Ethier and Joseph Shabason, Fresh Pepper

=== F ===
- Christine Fellows, Stuff We All Get
- Florian Hoefner Trio, Desert Bloom
- Frontperson, Parade
- Jeanick Fournier, Jeanick Fournier - October 7
- Angelique Francis, Long River
- Fredz, Astronaute
- Fucked Up, Do All Words Can Do - March 25

=== G ===
- Ali Gatie, Who Hurt You? - August 12
- Geoffroy, Live Slow Die Wise - January 19
- Ghostkeeper, Multidimensional Culture
- Alice Glass, PREY//IV - January 28
- Gloin, We Found This

=== H ===
- Nate Haller, Party in the Back - November 18
- Harm & Ease, Camino Loco
- Georgia Harmer, Stay in Touch - April 22
- Headstones, Flight Risk - October 14
- Kevin Hearn, There and Then: Solo Piano Improvisations - February 11
- Tim Hicks, Talk to Time - September 2
- High Valley, Way Back - May 20
- TheHonestGuy, How to Make Love
- Andrew Hyatt, Four Good Years

=== I ===
- iskwē and Tom Wilson, Mother Love
- Iva and Angu, Katajjausiit

=== J ===
- Emmanuel Jal, Shangah - July 8
- JayWood, Slingshot
- Carly Rae Jepsen, The Loneliest Time - October 21
- Berk Jodoin, Half-Breed
- Joyful Joyful, Joyful Joyful - April 29
- Junior Boys, Waiting Game - October 28

=== K ===
- Kellarissa, Voice Leading
- Mia Kelly, Garden Through the War
- Francois Klark, Adventure Book
- Pierre Kwenders, José Louis and the Paradox of Love - April 29

=== L ===
- Steph La Rochelle, Wildflower
- Bells Larsen, Good Grief
- Avril Lavigne, Love Sux - February 25
- Lisa LeBlanc, Chiac Disco - March 18
- Lights, Pep - April 1
- Limblifter, Little Payne - October 31
- Les Louanges, Crash - January 21
- Alexander Ludwig, Highway 99 - August 26
- Lysandre, Sans oublier

=== M ===
- Mama's Broke, Narrow Line
- Dan Mangan, Being Somewhere - October 28
- Mares of Thrace, The Exile
- Cory Marks, I Rise - November 11
- Tate McRae, I Used to Think I Could Fly - May 27
- Madeline Merlo, Slide - September 23
- Metric, Formentera - July 10
- Moist, End of the Ocean - January 14
- MorMor, Semblance
- David Myles, It's Only A Little Loneliness - September 23

=== N ===
- Nemahsis, Eleven Archers
- Nickelback, Get Rollin' - November 18
- Eliza Niemi, Staying Mellow Blows

=== O ===
- Oktoécho, Transcestral
- OMBIIGIZI, Sewn Back Together
- Johnny Orlando, all the things that could go wrong – August 19
- Our Lady Peace, Spiritual Machines 2 - January 28

=== P ===
- Marcus Paquin, Our Love - November 25
- Peach Pit, From 2 to 3 - March 4
- Orville Peck, Bronco - April 8
- Jonathan Personne, Jonathan Personne
- Powfu, Surrounded by Hounds and Serpents - December 2
- Chad Price, Introversion
- PUP, The Unraveling of PUPTheBand - April 1

=== R ===
- Josh Ramsay, The Josh Ramsay Show - April 8
- Rare Americans, You're Not a Bad Person, it's Just a Bad World (July); Songs That Don't Belong (December)
- Allan Rayman, Roadhouse 02 - March 18
- The Reklaws, Good Ol' Days - November 4
- Reuben and The Dark, In Lieu Of Light - September 9
- Jessie Reyez, Yessie - September 16
- Amanda Rheaume, The Spaces in Between
- Julianna Riolino, All Blue
- River Tiber, Dreaming Eyes - December 9
- Ariane Roy, Medium plaisir
- The Rural Alberta Advantage, The Rise

=== S ===
- The Sadies, Colder Streams - July 22
- Jay Scøtt, Rap Queb Vol. 1
- The Secret Beach, Songs from the Secret Beach
- Joseph Shabason and Nicholas Krgovich, At Scaramouche - October 7
- Mike Shabb, Sewaside II
- Jairus Sharif, Water & Tools
- Silverstein, Misery Made Me - May 6
- Simple Plan, Harder Than It Looks - May 6
- Dylan Sinclair, No Longer in the Suburbs
- Sister Ray, Communion
- Samantha Savage Smith, Fake Nice - April 22
- Sloan, Steady - October 21
- Stars, From Capelton Hill - May 27
- Kiefer Sutherland, Bloor Street - January 21
- Stereos, Cheap Thrills - November 4
- Sykamore, Pinto - August 12

=== T ===
- Tanya Tagaq, Tongues - March 11
- Julian Taylor, Beyond the Reservoir - October 14
- Tegan and Sara, Crybaby - October 21
- Three Days Grace, Explosions - May 6
- Maylee Todd, Maloo - March 4
- Tory Lanez, Sorry 4 What - September 30
- Devin Townsend, Lightwork
- Katie Tupper, Towards the End

=== V ===
- Jake Vaadeland, Everybody But Me
- Voivod, Synchro Anarchy - February 11

=== W ===
- Patrick Watson, Better in the Shade - April 22
- The Weather Station, How Is It That I Should Look at the Stars
- The Weeknd, Dawn FM - January 7
- Wild Rivers, Sidelines
- Royal Wood, What Tomorrow Brings
- Roy Woods, Mixed Emotions - August 5

=== Y ===
- Nikki Yanofsky, Nikki by Starlight - October 21
- Yoo Doo Right, A Murmur, Boundless to the East
- Young Guv, Guv III (March 11); Guv IV (TBA)

== Deaths ==
- January 17 - Karim Ouellet, singer-songwriter
- February 3 - Donny Gerrard, rock singer
- February 17
  - Dallas Good, country/rock musician (The Sadies)
  - Ginette Ravel, singer and lyricist
- March 14 - Eric Mercury, songwriter
- April 5 - Boris Brott, conductor
- April 16 - Bill Bourne, folk musician
- April 18 - Jerry Doucette, rock singer and guitarist ("Mama Let Him Play")
- April 25 - Susan Jacks, pop singer
- April 25 - Shane Yellowbird, country singer-songwriter
- April 29 - Walter Rossi, rock singer and guitarist
- May 29 - Ronnie Hawkins, rock singer
- June 16 - Big Rude Jake, swing jazz singer-songwriter
- August 7 - Gord Lewis, bassist (Teenage Head)
- November 25 - Al Mair, founder of Attic Records
- December 15 - Shirley Eikhard, singer-songwriter
- December 29 - Ian Tyson, singer-songwriter
