= Working Class Woman =

Studio album by Marie Davidson
- Released: 5 October 2018
- Recorded: Montreal, Canada; Berlin, Germany
- Genre: Electronic; techno; house
- Length: 42:51
- Label: Ninja Tune
- Producer: Marie Davidson; Pierre Guerineau; Asaël Robitaille; Cristobal Urbina

Marie Davidson chronology
Adieux au Dancefloor (2016)	Working Class Woman (2018)	Renegade Breakdown (2020)

Working Class Woman is the fourth solo studio album by French-Canadian musician Marie Davidson. It was released on Ninja Tune on 5 October 2018.

== Production ==
The album was created in Montreal and Berlin. Marie Davidson says: "It comes from my brain, through my own experiences: the suffering and the humour, the fun and the darkness to be Marie Davidson."

== Critical reception ==
Professional ratings
Aggregate scores
Source	Rating
AnyDecentMusic?	8.0/10
Metacritic	85/100
Review scores
Source	Rating
AllMusic	4/5 stars
Exclaim!	9/10
The Guardian	4/5 stars
NME	4/5 stars
Now	4/5
Pitchfork	7.8/10
Q	4/5 stars
Resident Advisor	4.0/5
The Skinny	5/5 stars
Tom Hull – on the Web	A−

At Metacritic, which assigns a weighted average score out of 100 to reviews from mainstream critics, the album received an average score of 85, based on 9 reviews, indicating "universal acclaim".

Paul Simpson of AllMusic gave the album 4 stars out of 5, saying: "With greater emotional depth and sonic clarity than her past recordings, Working Class Woman is an exciting breakthrough for Davidson." Sophie Kemp of Pitchfork wrote: "The lines between seriousness and humor are blurry, and that's kind of the point, where the album excels is in Davidson's ability to very much intentionally confuse her listener." Briony Pickford of The Skinny gave the album 5 stars out of 5, describing it as "a mix of successful, feminist personas commenting over relentless drums and chaotic synths."

=== Accolades ===
At the end of the year, the album was included in several best-albums-of-2018 lists, ranking in such lists by Now Magazine (3rd), Bleep (8th), Mixmag (10th), The Quietus (14th), Bandcamp Daily (19th), The 405 (28th), The Skinny (31st), Loud and Quiet (36th), FACT (43rd), Noisey (73rd), Fopp (100th), Resident Advisor (1 of 40 unranked albums), and XLR8R (1 of 35 unranked albums). It also featured in Exclaim!'s best dance and electronic albums of 2018 list, and PopMatters' best electronic music albums of 2018 list.

== Track listing ==
All music composed by Marie Davidson; all words written by Davidson; all tracks produced by Davidson and Pierre Guerineau, except where noted.

No.	Title	Length
1.	"Your Biggest Fan"	4:25
2.	"Work It"	4:20
3.	"The Psychologist"	4:47
4.	"Lara"	3:07
5.	"Day Dreaming"	4:12
6.	"The Tunnel"	3:37
7.	"Workaholic Paranoid Bitch"	4:52
8.	"So Right" (Davidson, Guerineau, Asaël Robitaille, Cristoball Urbina)	5:06
9.	"Burn Me"	5:15
10.	"La Chambre Intérieure"	3:08

== Personnel ==
Credits adapted from the liner notes of Working Class Woman.

Musicians

- Marie Davidson – music, words
- Pierre Guerineau – backing vocals (track 2)
- Bernardino Femminielli – backing vocals (track 2)
- Motorkiller – voice (track 3)

Technical personnel

- Marie Davidson – production
- Pierre Guerineau – production
- Asaël Robitaille – production (track 9)
- Cristobal Urbina – production (track 9)
- Max Gilkes – mastering

Design

- MMBP – artwork
- Etienne Saint-Denis – photography
