= Grab That Gun =

Grab that Gun

Studio album by The Organ
- Released: May 24, 2004
- Genre: Post-punk revival; Jangle pop
- Length: 29:56
- Label: Mint Records
- Producer: Katie Sketch, Paul Forgues, Todd Simko, and Kurt Dahle

Professional ratings
Review scores
Source	Rating
Allmusic	link
Pitchfork Media	6.6/10 link

Grab that Gun is a 2004 album by The Organ. It was the only full-length release from the band before they broke up. The first track Brother was featured on the show The L Word season 2 episode 2.

The album won the public vote for the Polaris Heritage Prize at the 2025 Polaris Music Prize.

== Track listing ==
All lyrics and songs written by The Organ except where noted.

1. "Brother" – 4:01
2. "Steven Smith" (Lyrics: K. Sketch, B. Choit. Song K. Sketch, B. Choit, S. Efron) – 2:02
3. "Love, Love, Love" – 3:31
4. "Basement Band Song" – 4:13
5. "Sinking Hearts" – 2:09
6. "A Sudden Death" – 2:54
7. "There is Nothing I Can Do" (Song: K. Sketch, S. Efron, S. Stocks, D. Cohen, J. Smyth) – 2:35
8. "I Am Not Surprised" (Song: K. Sketch, S. Stocks, D. Cohen, J. Smyth) – 2:44
9. "No One Has Ever Looked So Dead" (Song: K. Sketch, S. Efron, S. Stocks, D. Cohen, J. Smyth) – 1:57
10. "Memorize the City" (Lyrics K. Sketch, B. Choit, S. Ritchie) – 3:10
11. "Hidden Track" – 0:37

== Personnel ==
=== Production ===
- Katie Sketch - Producer
- Paul Forgues - Producer
- Todd Simko - Producer
- Kurt Dahle - Producer
- Howard Redekopp - Engineer

== Artwork ==
The front cover artwork was designed by the artist David Cuesta. The logo for the Organ was also done by Cuesta during the process of doing the cover, and was based on some sketches given to him by Katie and Jenny. It uses the font Avante Garde by Herb Lublain as the foundation for the lettering.

The artwork for the cover was a piece that the artist had been working on when Jenny Smyth came into his studio in the 7th Avenue House, to meet to discuss the designs for the album. The design is based on rectangles in a Fibonacci sequence and can be loosely interpreted as the duration of notes pressed on an organ.

The liner notes and remaining album artwork were then produced by Mohammad Salemy.
