= Verbathim =

2025 studio album by Nemahsis

Studio album by Nemahsis
- Released: September 13, 2024
- Genres: Indie-pop; alt-pop; folk-rock
- Length: 30:59
- Language: English
- Label: None (self-released)

Singles from Verbathim
- 1. "Stick of Gum" Released: May 23, 2024; 2. "You Wore It Better" Released: June 20, 2024; 3. "Fine Print" Released: July 23, 2024; 4. "Coloured Concrete" Released: August 23, 2024

Professional ratings
Review scores
Source	Rating
Exclaim!	8/10

Verbathim is the debut studio album by Palestinian-Canadian singer-songwriter Nemahsis. It was independently released on September 13, 2024. The album contains 12 tracks including singles "Stick of Gum", "You Wore It Better", "Fine Print", and "Coloured Concrete".

Verbathim won Alternative Album of the Year at the 2025 Juno Awards and was shortlisted for the 2025 Polaris Music Prize for Best Canadian Album.

== Background ==
Nemahsis began planning her debut album in November 2022 and had chosen the name Verbathim around the summer of 2023, later stating "I wanted [the title] to be as if someone grabbed my tongue in the middle of saying 'verbatim'."

In early October 2023, Nemahsis had signed a record deal for her debut album. Days later, she announced that she had been dropped from the label following the Hamas led October 7 attacks on Israel and Nemahsis's social media posts drawing attention to the subsequent Israeli blockade denying millions of Palestinians in Gaza access to food and water. On October 12, Nemahsis stated "My label just dropped me, a Palestinian artist, for being pro-Palestine". Nemahsis, who had been preparing to release her debut album through the label, stated she was "fully ostracized" after being dropped from the label and "didn't think there was going to be a future in music [for her]". After seeing she had been dropped from her label, Canadian producer 40 reached out to Nemahsis offering his studio and craft, which she accepted.

In the spring of 2024, Nemahsis traveled to check on her family in Jericho in the occupied West Bank which had been seeing an increase in settler violence. While there, her manager suggested shooting a music video for one of her tracks, with the artist deciding on "Stick of Gum". In April 2024, Nemahsis finalized a deal with a Toronto distribution label to release her album, only for the label to withdraw the deal the following day when she arrived to sign the papers. That night, Nemahsis decided to release her music with "no publishing, no distribution, no label", beginning with the track "Stick of Gum".

== Release and promotion ==
On May 23, 2024, Nemasis independently released "Stick of Gum" as the lead single of her debut album along with the music video shot in Jericho, stating "Some people didn't even know Palestine existed until October, and now we want to show them in a way where we're humanized again." Through the summer, Nemahsis released the singles "You Wore It Better", "Fine Print", and "Coloured Concrete" towards the album.

On September 13, 2024, Nemahsis independently released her debut album Verbathim, with album artwork featuring her dressed as a nun "to show that the world doesn't have a problem with modesty, but rather a problem with hijab" and her tongue being held to represent censorship she has faced. After the release of the album, Nemahsis stated "I wanted people to mark my words with the things that I was saying long before October 2023. Then, I was stripped of all connection and ostracised."

In November, Nemahsis announced a North American tour in support of Verbathim, beginning January 2025 in Vancouver and ending late February in Montreal. On January 16, 2025, Nemahsis performed a stripped-down version of track "Miss Construed" on The Late Show with Stephen Colbert.

== Reception ==
Vijai Kumar Singh of Exclaim! gave the album an 8 out of 10, praising Nemahsis's "exceptional vocal delivery" and "introspective lyricism". Singh further stated "Stick of Gum" was a "defining moment for [Nemahsis]" and praised its music video, opining it is "a love letter to Hasan's homeland [that] feels like an act of radical, humanizing protest".

During its week of release, "Stick of Gum" was included in weekly music recommendation playlists including Nylon's "Soundcheck" and Pitchfork's "Selects".

=== Accolades ===
Name of publisher, year(s) listed, name of listicle, recipient, and placement result
Work	Publisher	Accolade	Placement	Ref.
Verbathim	CBC Music	The 15 best Canadian albums of 2024	3	
"Coloured Concrete"	Billboard Canada	25 Best Canadian Songs of 2024	Placed	
"Stick of Gum"	Spotify	Editor's Picks: Best Songs of 2024	Placed	

== Awards and nominations ==
Award	Year	Category	Result	Ref.
Juno Award	2025	Alternative Album of the Year	Won	
Polaris Music Prize	2025	Best Canadian Album	Nominated (Short-listed)	

== Track listing ==
Track listing for Verbathim
No.	Title	Lyrics	Producer(s)	Length
1.	"Old Body, New Mind"	Nemah Hasan; Noah "40" Shebib; Rodaidh McDonald; Daniel Wilson; Matt MacNeil	Shebib; McDonald; MacNeil	3:26
2.	"You Wore It Better"	Hasan; Pablo Bowman; Danny Casio	Shebib; Bowman; Casio	1:56
3.	"Coloured Concrete"	Hasan; Bowman; Casio	Shebib; Casio	3:10
4.	"Fine Print"	Hasan; Bowman; Casio; Jason Evigan	Shebib; Casio; Evigan	2:21
5.	"Miss Construed"	Hasan; Bowman; Casio	Shebib; Bowman; Casio	3:34
6.	"Delusion"	Hasan; Bowman; Casio	Shebib; Bowman; Casio	2:46
7.	"I Borrow Happiness From Tomorrow"	Hasan; Bowman; Casio; Wilson	Shebib; Casio; Bowman	1:23
8.	"Dead Giveaway"	Hasan; Bowman; Casio	Shebib; Bowman; Casio	2:47
9.	"Spinning Plates"	Hasan; Bowman; Casio	Shebib; Bowman; Casio	2:05
10.	"Furniture Killer"	Hasan; Bowman; Casio	Shebib; Casio	2:05
11.	"Stick of Gum"	Hasan; Bowman; Casio	Shebib; Casio; Bowman	2:28
12.	"Chemical Mark"	Hasan; Michael Uzowuru; Adeyinka Bankole; Simon Edward Christensen; Wilson; Rahm Silverglade; Jesse Bielenberg	Uzowuru; Jad El Khoury; Shebib; Bowman; Adeyinka; Psymun; Silverglade; Bielenberg	2:54
Total length:				30:59

=== Notes ===
- All tracks are stylised in all lowercase.
