= Myriam Gendron =

Canadian musician

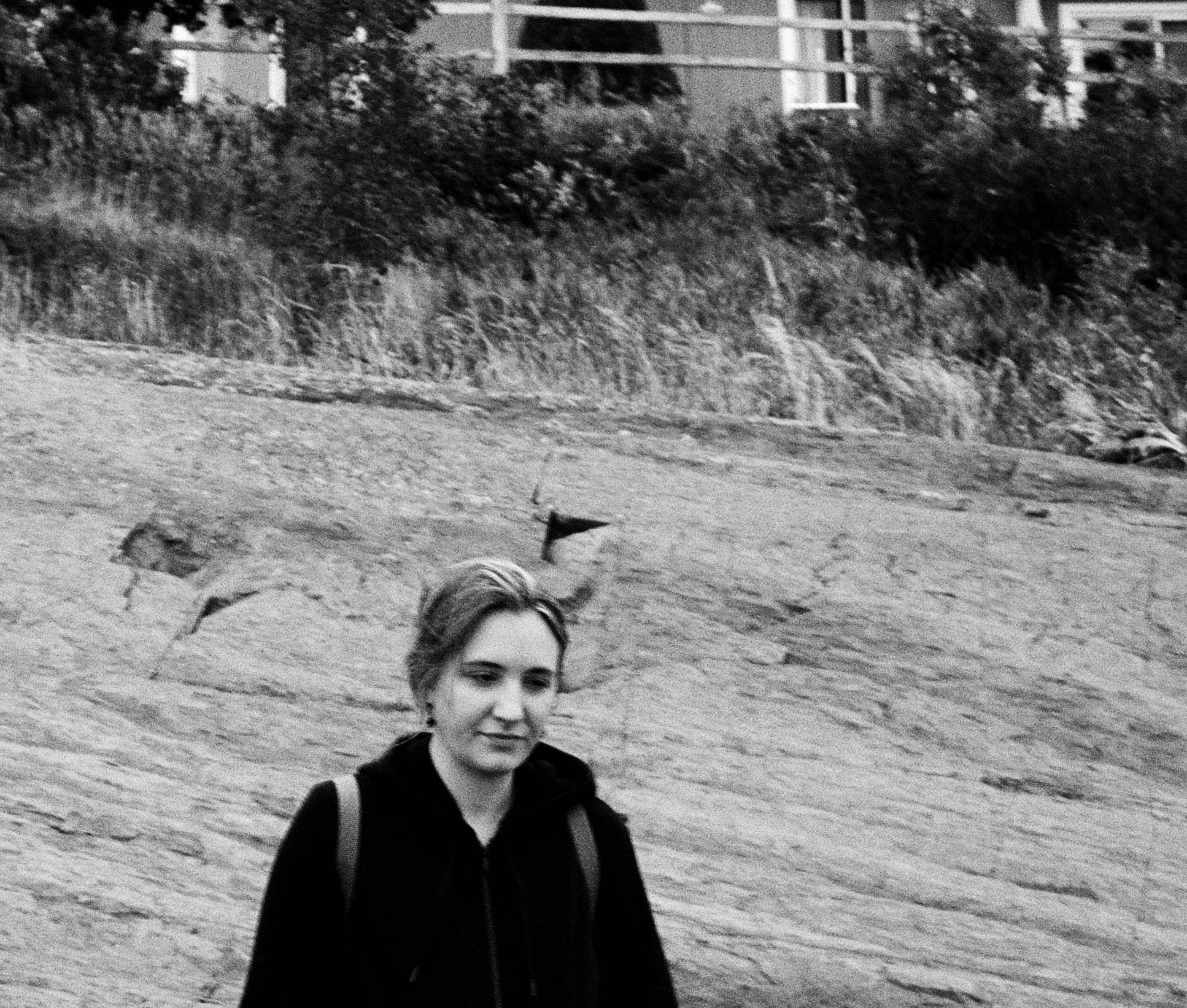
- Gendron behind Motel Cap Blanc in Rimouski, 2017

Background information
- Born: Ottawa, Ontario, Canada
- Occupation: Musician

Myriam Gendron is a Canadian musician and songwriter based in Montreal.

== Biography ==
Myriam Gendron was born in Ottawa, Ontario, Canada in 1988. She spent part of her childhood and adolescence in Gatineau, in Paris, and in Washington, D.C.

== Career ==
In 2014, her first album Not So Deep as a Well set poems by Dorothy Parker to music. Most vinyl editions of the album included a raving one sheet insert by pioneer rock critic Richard Meltzer: “the disc you now hold is the hottest—and FINEST!—Impossible Love collection in, I dunno, 30 years. 35! (True.) … ARE U READY 4 WOE?”. Two other poems by Parker were also set to music and released in 2015: “Bric-à-brac” and “The Small Hours”.

A second album was released in 2021, titled Ma Délire. Songs of Love, Lost and Found and largely oriented around her contemporary interpretations of popular Canadian music. It received high praises from critics both in the francophone world (Le Devoir ranked it as 5th best Quebec album of the year; Olivier Lamm in French paper Libération wrote that “Ma délire is a classic for the future and for the past.”) and in anglophone medias : Pitchfork's Marc Masters gave it a rare 8.0 score, writing “As a vocalist, guitarist, and songwriter, [Gendron]’s a masterful musical interpreter, transforming long-past art into present-tense vision”, Joseph Neff in The Vinyl District graded it A+ writing “its 15 tracks cohere into a statement of astonishing power, making it one of 2021’s finest releases.” The album notably includes “Au cœur de ma délire”, a traditional song first popularized by Dominique Tremblay and Philippe Gagnon, two members of Robert Charlebois’s touring entourage . It also includes a version of “Par un dimanche au soir”, and “Le tueur de femmes”. The song “Poor Girl Blues” is an interpolation of “Un Canadien errant”. The album also includes her interpretations of several traditional songs from other cultures, such as “Go Away From My Window”, a traditional American folk song collected by John Jacob Niles, and songs with more complex histories, such as “Shenandoah”, an American sea shanty dating from the early nineteenth century with French-Canadian origins.

“Literature is a passion for me, and in folk music I’ve found a literary form that suits me well”, she explains, adding: “I love all kinds of music: alternative music, metal… I like when it rips, and folk is not incompatible with that.” She also works as a bookseller in Montreal.

On may 10th 2024 her third album Mayday was released to critical acclaim as a corelease on American labels Thrill Jockey and Feeding Tube Records for physical and digital copies and on Canadian label Chivichivi for streaming. The album was longlisted for the 2025 Polaris Music Prize.

== Discography ==
- 2014: Not So Deep as a Well, Feeding Tube Records, Mama Bird Recording Co.
- 2015: "Bric-à-brac" / "The Small Hours", Feeding Tube Records, L'Oie de Cravan Records
- 2021: Ma Délire. Songs of Love, Lost and Found, Feeding Tube Records, les albums claus
- 2024: Mayday, Feeding Tube Records, Thrill Jockey
