= Feu de garde =

Studio album by Bibi Club
- Released: May 10, 2024
- Studio: Studio Waterhouse
- Length: 34:09
- Language: Canadian French
- Label: Secret City Records
- Producers: Nicolas Basque; Adèle Trottier-Rivard

Bibi Club chronology
Le soleil et la mar (2023)	Feu de garde (2024)	Amaro (2026)

"I think you're right, there's like a little weird, melancholy, like something between night and day, or, that weird, foggy morning feeling. It's a more complex feeling than joy or sadness or surge in spirituality."

— Nicolas Basque of Bibi Club on the emotional themes in Feu de garde

Feu de garde is the second studio album by Canadian indie pop group Bibi Club, released on May 10, 2024 through Secret City Records. It received positive reviews from critics.

== Reception ==
According to the review aggregator Metacritic, Feu de garde received "generally favorable reviews" based on a weighted average score of 78 out of 100 from 4 critic scores. This was the album of the week in the Canadian edition of Billboard, where Kerry Doole noted that the album was getting good reviews and displays the group's signature sound of "pulsating keyboards, driving guitars, melodic vocals and thoughtful lyrics". Writing for BrooklynVegan, Bill Pearis also declared it an album of the week, writing that it "feel[s] instantly transportive, tapping into old memories or hitting an emotion center that you didn't know you had" and praising the "wistful breeze blowing through these 11 songs that make you want to close your eyes, sway and feel it blow across your cheek". In Exclaim!, Alex Hudson rated the album a 9 out of 10, comparing its music to Stereolab's and declaring it "one of 2024's must-hear strokes of genius, crossing linguistic borders with its expression of understated, comforting beauty".

=== Year-end lists ===
Select year-end rankings for Feu de garde
Publication/critic	Accolade	Rank	Ref.
Exclaim!	50 Best Albums of 2024	8	

The album was shortlisted for the 2025 Polaris Music Prize.

== Track listing ==
All songs written by Nicolas Basque and Adèle Trottier-Rivard

1. "La terre" – 3:22
2. "Parc de Beauvoir" – 3:03
3. "Shloshlo" – 3:07
4. "Le feu" – 3:51
5. "you can wear a jacket or a shirt" – 3:19
6. "Les guides" – 2:21
7. "L'île aux bleuets" – 3:25
8. "Samedi / le lit" – 2:48
9. "ce qui va disparaître" – 1:49
10. "Nico" – 3:55
11. "Rue du Repos" – 3:09

== Personnel ==
Bibi Club

- Nicolas Basque – bass guitar, guitar, synthesizer, vocals, drum programming, field recording, production
- Adèle Trottier-Rivard – synthesizer, drums, congas, percussion, vocals, production

Additional personnel

- Lévi Basque – bells
- Noé Basque – bells
- Emma Broughton – vocals
- Ali Chant – mixing
- Matt Colton – audio mastering
- Helena Deland – vocals
- Camille Delean – vocals
- Mili Hong – drums
- Eugénie Jobin – vocals
- Mischa Karam – vocals
- Robin Love – vocals
- Niklas Lueger – assistant mixing
- Safia Nolin – vocals
- Carmel Scurti-Belley – vocals
- Marie-Christine Trottier – flute
- Mégane Voghell – artwork
- Daniel Yates – artwork, graphic design

== See also ==
- 2024 in Canadian music
- List of 2024 albums
