= Mohammad Salemy =

Iranian art critic

- Born: 1967 (age 58–59); Kermanshah, Pahlavi Iran
- Other name: Mo Salemy
- Education: Emily Carr University of Art and Design, University of British Columbia
- Occupations: Artist, art critic, curator
- Organization(s): The New Centre for Research & Practice

Mohammad Salemy (born 1967 in Iran, Kermanshah) is a Canadian artist, art critic, curator, writer . curator, writer He is sometimes referred to as "Mo Salemy".

== Biography ==
Salemy holds a master's degree in Critical Curatorial Studies from the University of British Columbia. His work is situated in the space between curatorial and artistic practice.""The 8th Climate, 11th Gwangju Biennale"". the8thclimate.org.

== Artist ==
As an artist he has shown his work internationally and nationally, specially in Ashkal Alwan in Beirut and Witte de With in Rotterdam. In 2016 he participated in the Gwangju Biennale with his project "For Machine Use Only".

== Curator ==
Salemy has curated shows at the Morris and Helen Belkin Art Gallery, Koerner Gallery, AMS Gallery at the University of British Columbia, Access Gallery, as well as the Satellite Gallery and he was the curator of Dadabase. Lastly his curatorial project "For Machine Use Only" was included in the 11th edition of the Gwangju Biennale. His curatorial project "This is the Sea" was included in the 2017 edition of the artmonte-carlo Together with Patrick Schabus he curated the 2018 edition of the Sofia Queer Forum, that featured Barbara Hammer and Bruce laBruce.

== Teaching ==
He is one of the co-founders of The New Centre for Research & Practice and the Fixing the Future platform. In 2014, he organized the Incredible Machines conference in Vancouver. and the "Here and Elsewhere, at War, and into the Future: Palestine" Discussion that was hosted Live at Whitebox Art Center. In 2015 he co-organized the "Knowledge Forms and Forming Knowledge – Limits and Horizons of Transdisciplinary Art-Based Research" Seminar at the University of Graz and the IZK Künstlerhaus – Halle für Kunst & Medien. He gave lectures and presentations at the New Museum, Art in General, the Dutch Art Institute, UNSW University of New South Wales, Witte de With Contemporary Art, Goethe-Institut, CalArts School of Critical Studies, NYU, CA2M and the University of British Columbia.

== Publications ==
As a writer, critic, and editor, Salemy has been a regular contributor to numerous exhibition catalogues, anthologies, and journals. His writings have appeared in numerous journals, catalogues, books, and magazines including: e-flux, Volume, Flash Art, Brooklyn Rail , Third Rail,Ocula, Spike Art Quarterly DIS Magazine, C Magazine

In 2016 he edited the book For Machine Use Only (&&& / The New Centre, 2016.) that featured texts by Jason Adams / Kate Armstrong, Elie Ayache, Benjamin Bratton, Clint Burnham, Lou Cantor, Manuel Correa, Alexander Galloway, Leo Goldsmith, Simón Isaza, Victoria Ivanova, Vaclav Janoscik, Ed Keller, Diana Khamis, Jessica Law, Siwin Lo, Nicola Masciandaro, Gean Moreno, Benjamin Noys, Jeff O’Brien, Matteo Pasquinelli, David Roden, Judith Rodenbeck, Rory Rowan, Daniel Sacilotto, Samuel Sackeroff, T’ai Smith, Nick Srnicek, Kate Steinmann, Steven Warrick, and Peter Wolfendale.

His texts were published in books like "reinventing horizons", and Politics of study. He participated in numerous panel discussions and lectures in galleries, museums and colleges.

== Works (selection) ==
ART AFTER THE MACHINES, 2015

The Artist Is Hyperpresent, Installation 2015

What were you doing on 9/11?, 2010-2015

Stairwell, 2015

Preliminary materials for any theory, 2014

THIS IS NEW YORK GARBAGE, Color prints, 2009

In between the empty frames, Color prints, 2008

How to Assemble an Atomic Bomb, DVD and tin can, 2006.

Exhumed: Deliberating R.M. Khomeini, Photographs, 2002

== Other endeavors ==
He was the co-founder of the successful fashion label "Government Clothing", and is known for his activism He also worked as a designer, specially for The Organ (band)'s album Grab that gun

== Bibliography ==
- "The Sacred Meme Magic",
- "For Machine Use Only", &&& / The New Centre, 2016.
- "Politics of Study". www.mottodistribution.com.
- Manuel Correa, "artoffline" produced by Indiepix Films,2018.
- Dorothée Dupuis (ed.), "Mohammad Salemy and the New Centre for Research and Practice" in "Terremoto 4. " 2015.
- "Reinventing Horizons". www.reinventinghorizons.org. 2016.
- Salemy, Mohammad. "Tom McGlynn and the Asymtotes of Opticality", catalogue essay, For Geochromatic Index on Dadabase.Com NYC, 2014
- Salemy, Mohammad (6 December 2017). "Our World: McLuhan's Idea of Globalized Presence as the Prehistory of Computational Temporality – Imaginations".
- "Time and Televisual Intersubjectivity, McLuhan's Idea of Globalized Presence as the Prehistory of Telecomputation" in "This is Paradise: Art and Artists in Toronto", Published on 28 May 2015, pages 12–13
