= The Boys (Cleopatrick EP) =

EP by Cleopatrick
- Released: June 29, 2018
- Recorded: 2017–2018
- Genre: Alternative rock, indie rock, stoner rock, hard rock
- Length: 20:24
- Label: Self-released

Cleopatrick chronology
"14" (2016)	The Boys (2018)	Bummer (2021)

Singles from The Boys
- 1. "Hometown" Released: October 20, 2017; 2. "Bernard Trigger" Released: February 4, 2018; 3. "Daphne Did It / The Depths" Released: April 13, 2018; 4. "Youth" Released: June 29, 2018

The Boys (stylized as the boys) is the second extended play by Canadian indie rock outfit, Cleopatrick. The EP was released on June 29, 2018 through the band's SoundCloud account.

== Critical reception ==
Matthew Waters, writing for Xune Mag described the album as "devilishly talented" and praised the accessibility, and musicianship of the EP. Waters described The Boys as a "lush set of uncomplicated rock that easy to listen to and enjoy. Cleopatrick have circumvented the hard rock theme and elevated it to something truly fantastic. Intelligent lyrics accompany a gritty rock backdrop."

Writing for CFML-FM, Hannah Gorton praised the energy of the album, but dismissed the idea of this band being rock revivalists.

== Track listing ==
All tracks are written by Ian Fraser and Luke Gruntz.

No.	Title	Length
1.	"Hometown"	4:16
2.	"Daphne Did It"	3:23
3.	"The Depths"	4:02
4.	"Calling It Off"	1:29
5.	"Bernard Trigger"	3:29
6.	"Youth"	4:03
Total length:		20:24
