= Essaie pas =

Canadian electronic music group

- Origin: Montreal, Quebec, Canada
- Genres: Electronic; minimal; synth-pop; cold wave
- Years active: 2010–present
- Labels: Téméraire; Malditos; Teenage Menopause; Atelier Ciseaux; DFA
- Members: Marie Davidson; Pierre Guerineau
- Website: essaiepas.bandcamp.com

Essaie pas (French for "don't try") is a Canadian electronic music group formed in 2010. Based in Montreal, Quebec, the group consists of wife-and-husband duo Marie Davidson and Pierre Guerineau.

== History ==
The duo formed in the summer of 2010, releasing a guitar-oriented four-song cassette EP in the following year on their own Téméraire Records. Their following releases, a 2012 split with Hobo Cubes and Tout est jeune EP, showcased an electronic-oriented sound. In 2013, Malditos Records and Teenage Menopause Records co-released the compilation Nuit de noce, which featured the tracks from the previous cassettes, as well as an unreleased track, in vinyl format. A split EP with Police des moeurs and the 7" single "Danse sociale" were issued in 2014 and 2015, respectively.

In 2016, Essaie pas released its debut studio album, Demain est une autre nuit, on DFA Records. The album was longlisted for 2016 Polaris Music Prize. Its follow-up record, New Path, was announced in early 2018 and was released on DFA later that year. An accompanying music video for the album track, "Complet Brouillé" was also produced. In 2019, the band issued Earth EP, which they regarded as "a tribute to late 1990s, early 2000s pop trance tracks."

== Musical style and lyrics ==
Essaie pas's music has been described as electronic, minimal synth-pop and cold wave. Considered to be among the "contemporary groups reviving the DIY minimal synth sound of the 70s and 80s," the band combines "dark, minimal synth pop, French pop, Italo-disco, and elements of horror movie soundtracks." Their lyrics, spoken and sung both by Davidson and Guerineau largely in French, feature themes such as loneliness, sexuality, and fantasy. The band's sophomore album, New Path drew on the themes of "personal ground, on addiction, loss and the lingering strength of identity within late capitalism’s mass media paranoia."

The band's debut, Demain est une autre nuit was compared to "Giorgio Moroder and John Carpenter film scores as well as the industrial synth pop of Chris & Cosey," as well as Davidson's minimal wave solo work. The band's sound also drew comparisons to the early Human League, "Sensoria"-era Cabaret Voltaire and darkwave acts such as Xeno & Oaklander and Cold Cave. New Path, which featured "English and French lyrics, techno beats and fear-inducing soundscapes," was heavily influenced by Philip K. Dick's 1977 novel, A Scanner Darkly and borrows its title from the book.

== Discography ==
Studio albums

- Demain est une autre nuit (2016)
- New Path (2018)

EPs

- Essaie pas (2011)
- Liaisons dans la nuit / Le fruit des solitudes (2012; split with Hobo Cubes)
- Tout est jeune (2012)
- Police des moeurs / Essaie pas (2014; split with Police des moeurs)
- Demain est une autre nuit (The Remixes) (2016)
- New Path (The Remixes) (2018)
- Earth (2019)

Singles

- "Danse sociale" (2015)
- "Futur parlé" (2017)

Compilation

- Nuit de noce (2013)
