= Marie Davidson =

Canadian electronic musician (born 1987)

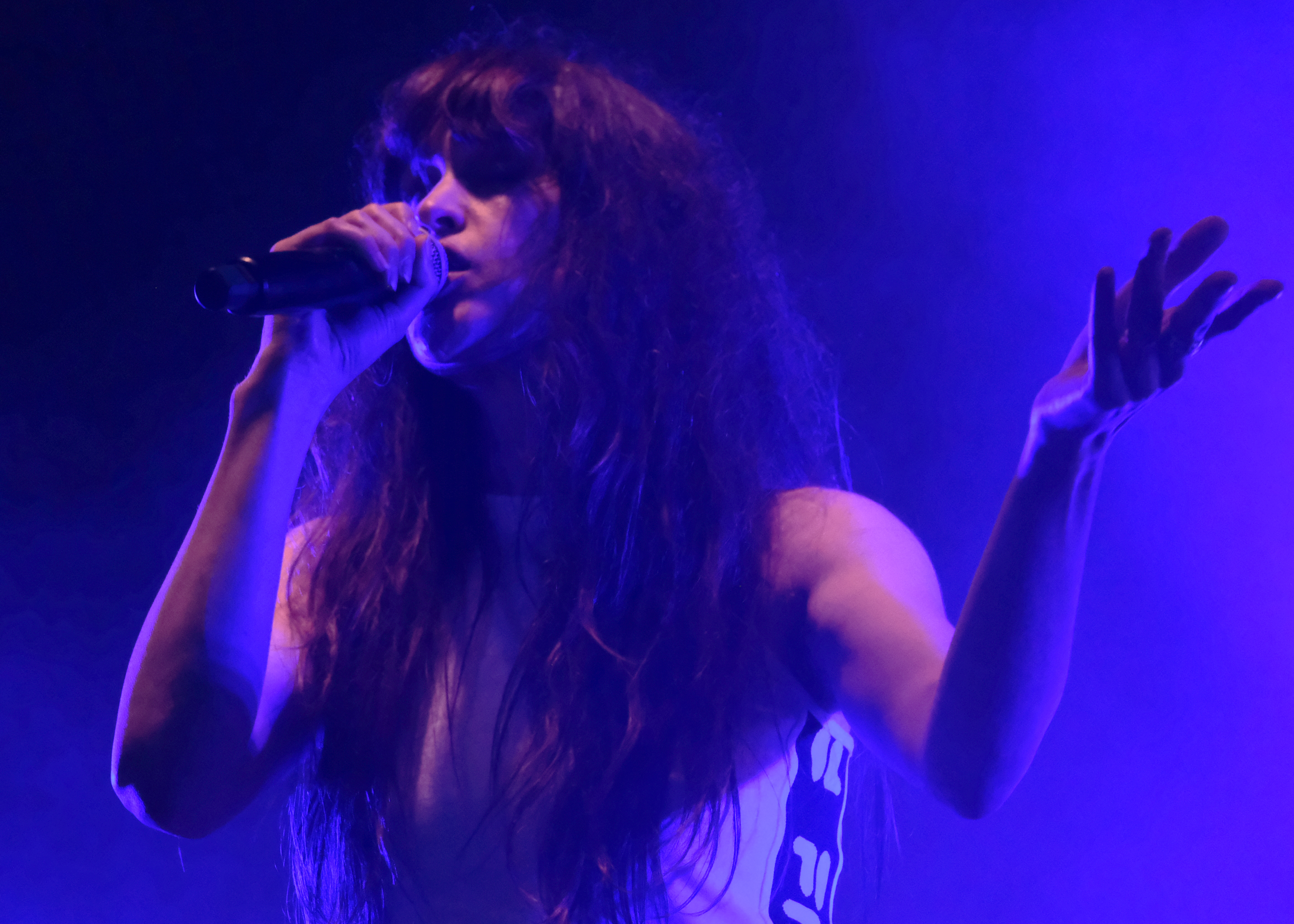
- Davidson performing in 2025

Background information
- Born: Marie Davidson; 1987 (age 38–39)
- Origin: Montreal, Canada
- Genres: Electronic; techno; minimal wave
- Occupations: Singer; musician; record producer
- Instruments: Vocals; synthesizer; violin
- Years active: 2007–present
- Labels: Cititrax; Holodeck; Weyrd Son; Ninja Tune; Deewee
- Member of: Essaie pas

Marie Davidson (born 1987) is a Canadian electronic musician and producer from Montreal.

== Career ==
Davidson was part of the duo Les Momies de Palerme, along with Xarah Dion. Their album, Brûlez ce coeur, was released on Constellation Records in 2010. She has collaborated with various other musicians including Matana Roberts (on her project Coin Coin Chapter One: Gens de couleur libres) and David Kristian, and she was part of the orchestral project Land of Kush.

She is also one half of the minimal wave duo Essaie pas, a duo she formed with her partner, Pierre Guerineau. The duo were longlisted for the 2016 Polaris Music Prize for their album Demain est une autre nuit.

Her third solo album, Adieux au dancefloor, was named by Pitchfork as one of "The 20 Best Electronic Albums of 2016". The album is themed around Davidson's ambivalent feelings towards dance music and club culture. She released Working Class Woman on Ninja Tune in 2018. She released Renegade Breakdown on Ninja Tune in 2020, and City of Clowns in 2025.

City of Clowns was shortlisted for the 2025 Polaris Music Prize.

== Musical style ==
Davidson's music has been labelled as techno and minimal wave, with AllMusic's Paul Simpson describing it as "cold, hypnotic minimal wave with analog synthesizers and drum machines, showcasing her intimate yet detached lyrics that are more often spoken than sung." Pitchfork critic Sophie Kemp has stated that the sound of Working Class Woman is "somewhere between spoken word electroclash of Miss Kittin and the dreamy dissonance of Julee Cruise."

== Discography ==
Studio albums

- Perte d'identité (2014)
- Un autre voyage (2015)
- Adieux au dancefloor (2016)
- Working Class Woman (2018)
- Renegade Breakdown (2020)
- City of Clowns (2025)
