= Mayday (Myriam Gendron album) =

Studio album by Myriam Gendron
- Released: May 10, 2024
- Genre: Avant-folk; Canadian folk music
- Length: 43:49
- Language: English, French
- Label: Feeding Tube Records/Thrill Jockey

Myriam Gendron chronology
Ma délire – Songs of Love, Lost and Found (2021)	Mayday (2024)

"When I came home, I had all this grieving to do. I hadn't really had time for it. May is such a beautiful month, especially here where winters are so long. But she was dying. So there was this contradiction between how you should feel and how you really feel,"

—Myriam Gendron on being a caretaker for her mother, the impetus for the songs on Mayday

Mayday is a 2024 studio album by Canadian singer-songwriter Myriam Gendron. It has received positive reviews from critics and features original lyrics about Gendron's mother's death, environmentalism, and lullabyes.

== Reception ==
According to the review aggregator Metacritic, Mayday received "universal acclaim" based on a weighted average score of 84 out of 100 from 8 critic scores. In Exclaim!, Vish Kanna rated this release an 8 out of 10, stating that the "weary and uncompromising" songs on it are "about the foundational elements we work with whenever we must rebuild our ruined selves". Editors at Pitchfork scored this release 7.7 out of 10, and Linnie Greene stated that "there are moments on Mayday that feel essential, plucked out of the ether as if they've always existed", with Gendron "reenvisioning what's timeless for this precise moment". Bruce Miller of PopMatters gave Mayday a 7 out of 10, stating that Gendron has shown growth as a performer since her previous albums. In Spin, Reed Jackson rated Mayday an A−, stating that Gendron's exploration of a proper recording studio and several backing musicians enhanced the music on this release and "With her remarkable voice—slippery, shadowy, haunted by the ghost of itself—and dolorous melodic sensibility, Gendron renders whatever she's feeling (grief, awe, bittersweet joy) as a complex continuum. Her songs are always jubilant and despairing, resolute and unmoored, hopeless and stubbornly persistent all at once."

In a May 31 roundup of the best albums of the year, editors at Exclaim! ranked this 23, with Daniel Sylvester calling the music a mix of "Shenandoah" and Sebadoh. A June 4 overview of the best albums of the year so far at Stereogum included Mayday at 24 and James Rettig wrote that Gendron "pulls from traditional folk songs and other people's poems and blends them in with a mythic imagery all her own, and she's bolstered by master-class musicians that build out the uncomplicated pure centers of her songs".

The album was longlisted for the 2025 Polaris Music Prize.

== Track listing ==
1. "There Is No East or West" – 5:02
2. "Long Way Home" – 4:02
3. "Terres brûlées" – 6:13
4. "Dorothy's Blues" – 2:38
5. "La Luz" – 2:50
6. "La belle Françoise (pour Sylvie)" – 6:46
7. "Lully Lullay" – 4:29
8. "Look Down That Lonesome Road" – 4:12
9. "Quand j'étais jeune et belle" – 2:39
10. "Berceuse" – 4:04

== Personnel ==
- Myriam Gendron – acoustic guitar, classical guitar, electric guitar, banjo, percussion, vocals
- Zoh Amba – tenor saxophone on "Berceuse"
- Marisa Anderson – electric guitar on "Long Way Home", "Terres brûlées", and "Lully Lullay"
- Cédric Dind-Lavoie – double bass on "Long Way Home", "Terres brûlées", and "La belle Françoise (pour Sylvie)"
- Bill Nace – electric guitar and loops on "Terres brûlées"
- Jim White – drums on "Long Way Home", "Terres brûlées", and "Lully Lullay"

== See also ==
- 2024 in Canadian music
- List of 2024 albums
