= La Sécurité =

Canadian musical group

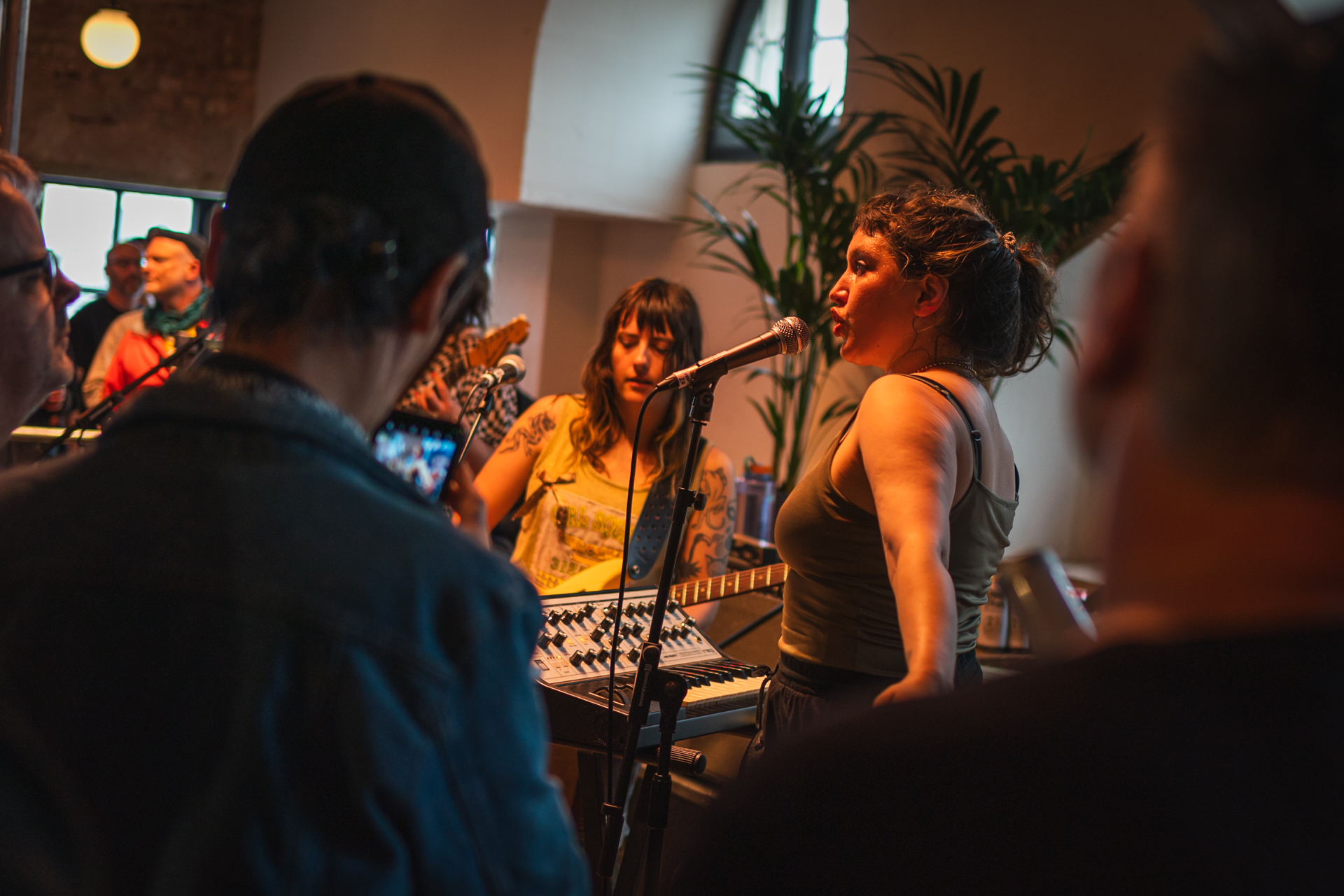
La Sécurité

La Sécurité is a Canadian dance-punk group from Montreal, Quebec, whose debut album Stay Safe! was released in 2023.

The band, consisting of vocalist Éliane Viens-Synnott, guitarists Melissa Di Menna and Laurence-Anne Charest-Gagné, bassist Félix Bélisle (Choses Sauvages) and Kenny Smith, was launched in 2020 as a side project during the COVID-19 lockdowns, when the members could not play in their primary bands.

Stay Safe! was a longlisted nominee for the 2024 Polaris Music Prize.

The band toured the United States in 2024, supporting the Go! Team.
