= 2025 Polaris Music Prize =

Canadian music award

- Date: September 16, 2025
- Location: Massey Hall
- Country: Canada
- Hosted by: Haviah Mighty
- Winner(s): Yves Jarvis, All Cylinders
- Website: polarismusicprize.ca

The 2025 edition of the Canadian Polaris Music Prize was presented on September 16, 2025 at Massey Hall.

The prize for the winning album was reduced to $30,000, rather than the $50,000 awarded to recent winners, but was supplemented with a new $10,000 SOCAN Polaris Song Prize to honour individual songs. This new award replaces the SOCAN Songwriting Prize, which has been dormant since 2023.

The prize committee also launched the Polaris Festival, a series of concerts highlighting past and present Polaris nominees in a variety of locations across Canada. At the ceremony, they additionally announced a new platform to improve opportunities for emerging musicians to submit their music for Polaris consideration.

The album prize was won by Yves Jarvis for All Cylinders, with the song prize won by Mustafa for "Gaza Is Calling".

== Albums ==
=== Shortlist ===
The shortlist for albums was announced on July 10.

- Yves Jarvis, All Cylinders
- Bibi Club, Feu de garde
- Lou-Adriane Cassidy, Journal d’un Loup-Garou
- Marie Davidson, City of Clowns
- Saya Gray, Saya
- Mustafa, Dunya
- Nemahsis, Verbathim
- The OBGMs, Sorry, It's Over
- Population II, Maintenant Jamais
- Ribbon Skirt, Bite Down

=== Longlist ===
The longlist for albums was announced on June 10.

- Art d'Ecco, Serene Demon
- Backxwash, Only Dust Remains
- Quinton Barnes, Code Noir
- Basia Bulat, Basia's Palace
- Caribou, Honey
- Choses Sauvages, Choses Sauvages III
- Cold Specks, Light for the Midnight
- Antoine Corriveau, Oiseau de Nuit
- Destroyer, Dan's Boogie
- Myriam Gendron, Mayday
- Gloin, all of your anger is actually shame (and I bet that makes you angry)
- Hildegard (Ouri and Helena Deland), Jour 1596
- Kaia Kater, Strange Medicine
- Bells Larsen, Blurring Time
- Richard Laviolette, All Wild Things Are Shy
- Wyatt C. Louis, Chandler
- Kelly McMichael, After the Sting of It
- Men I Trust, Equus Asinus
- N Nao, Nouveau langage
- Eliza Niemi, Progress Bakery
- Dorothea Paas, Think of Mist
- Klô Pelgag, Abracadabra
- Ariane Roy, Dogue
- Mike Shabb, Sewaside III
- Sister Ray, Believer
- Snotty Nose Rez Kids, Red Future
- The Weather Station, Humanhood
- Rick White and The Sadies, Rick White and The Sadies
- Donovan Woods, Things Were Never Good If They're Not Good Now
- Yoo Doo Right, From the Heights of Our Pastureland

== Songs ==
=== Shortlist ===
The shortlist for songs was announced on July 29.

- Mustafa, "Gaza Is Calling"
- Lou-Adriane Cassidy, "Dis-moi dis-moi dis-moi"
- Saya Gray, "Shell (Of a Man)"
- Yves Jarvis, "Gold Filigree"
- Ribbon Skirt, "Wrong Planet"

=== Longlist ===
The longlist for songs was announced on June 24.

- Art d'Ecco, "The Traveller"
- Backxwash, "History of Violence"
- Backxwash, "9th Heaven"
- Caribou, "Honey"
- Lou-Adriane Cassidy, "Dis-moi dis-moi dis-moi"
- Marie Davidson, "Fun Times"
- Saya Gray, "Shell (Of a Man)"
- Yves Jarvis, "Gold Filigree"
- Kaytranada and Lou Phelps, "Call U Up"
- Richard Laviolette, "Constant Love"
- Mustafa, "Gaza Is Calling"
- The OBGMs, "Changes" (feat. SATE)
- Klô Pelgag, "Le goût des mangues"
- Propagandhi, "At Peace"
- Reuben and the Bullhorn Singers, "Powerful"
- Ribbon Skirt, "Wrong Planet"
- Snotty Nose Rez Kids, "FREE" (feat. Aysanabee, Drezus, Rueben George)
- Colin Stetson, "The love it took to leave you"
- The Weather Station, "Neon Signs"
- Rick White and the Sadies, "Fly Away"

== Polaris Heritage Prize ==
Unlike in prior years, when the nominees for the Polaris Heritage Prize were announced at the Polaris gala with the winner announced approximately two to three weeks later, in 2025 for the first time the nominees were revealed in August, and the winners were announced at the same ceremony as the album and song prizes.

- Public Prize: The Organ, Grab That Gun
- Jury Prize: Jane Siberry, The Speckless Sky
- Choclair, Ice Cold
- Constantines, Constantines
- Franck Dervieux, Dimension M
- Do Make Say Think, Goodbye Enemy Airship the Landlord Is Dead
- Doughboys, Crush
- Dubmatique, La force de comprendre
- Mort Garson, Mother Earth's Plantasia
- Propagandhi, Today's Empires, Tomorrow's Ashes
- Rascalz, Cash Crop
- Strawberry, Brokeheart Audio
