= Fake Moon =

Studio album by Cleopatrick
- Released: 14 March 2025
- Label: Nowhere Special Recordings
- Producers: Luke Gruntz; Ian Fraser; Phil Weinrobe

Cleopatrick chronology
Doom (2022)	Fake Moon (2025)	SCRAP (2025)

Singles from Fake Moon
- 1. "Hammer" Released: 1 November 2024; 2. "Please" Released: 22 January 2025; 3. "Bad Guy" Released: 12 February 2025

Fake Moon (stylized in all caps) is the second studio album by Canadian rock duo Cleopatrick. It was released on 14 March 2025 through Nowhere Special Recordings. The release is the follow-up to their debut studio album Bummer (2021). The singles have marked a departure from the band's earlier sound, taking on an indie-influenced style. The band has indicated that this is another evolution for their sound.

== Background and promotion ==
In August 2024, the band announced a five-stop concert tour to debut the new album with four shows in the United States and one in England. Notably, the band indicated the setlists would only be made-up of songs off of the upcoming album. The band would perform one of the scheduled dates, 6 November 2024 in Los Angeles, California. The subsequent shows in Denver, New York, and London would be first rescheduled on 8 November 2024 due to inclement weather conditions in Denver, Colorado. The Chicago tour stop would be cancelled on that date. On 10 November 2024 the shows in Denver, New York, and London would be cancelled.

On 28 October 2024 the band announced the first single of the album, Hammer. The song would release on all platforms on 1 November 2024. On 22 January 2025, the second single, "Please", would be released on all platforms. Alongside the announcement of the single, the band would confirm for the first time the upcoming release of Fake Moon. The single Bad Guy would be released on 12 February 2025, the final single before the full album release in March 2025.

== Track listing ==
- All tracks are written by Luke Gruntz and Ian Fraser.

No.	Title	Length
1.	"Heat Death"	3:36
2.	"Bad Guy"	3:26
3.	"Hammer"	3:20
4.	"Please"	3:27
5.	"Softdrive"	1:25
6.	"Chew"	3:37
7.	"Big Machine"	3:32
8.	"Sarah"	2:10
9.	"Fake Moon"	3:19
10.	"Love You"	3:54

Notes

- All tracks are stylized in all caps.
