= Bummer (album) =

Studio album by Cleopatrick
- Released: 4 June 2021
- Recorded: 2020
- Studios: Orange Lounge (Toronto, Canada); Club Dubé (Ottawa, Canada)
- Length: 28:47
- Label: Nowhere Special Recordings
- Producers: Cleopatrick; Jig Dubé

Cleopatrick chronology
| The Boys (2018) | Bummer (2021) | Doom (2022) |

Singles from Bummer
- 1. "Good Grief" Released: 11 December 2020; 2. "The Drake" Released: 11 March 2021; 3. "Family Van" Released: 21 April 2021; 4. "2008" Released: 19 May 2021

Bummer (stylised in uppercase) is the debut studio album by Canadian rock duo Cleopatrick. It was released on 4 June 2021 via Nowhere Special Recordings.

== Release ==
The first single "Good Grief" was released on 11 December 2020, alongside its accompanying music video. Gruntz said the song "marks a new era for our band". This was followed by second single "The Drake" on 11 March 2021, which Gruntz says was written about "assholes from our hometown".

The third single "Family Van" was released on 20 April 2021, alongside the announcement of the album, and an online video game themed with the song. About the song, Gruntz said "I wrote Family Van after a band ripped one of our songs off. They were bigger than us and we felt powerless." An official PowerPoint presentation was released too, before the music video on May 11. The song went onto peak at No. 32 on the US Mainstream Rock Charts, and at No. 45 in the Canadian Rock Charts.

The final single "2008" was released on 19 May 2021, along with its music video. Gruntz described it as the "most honest moment on the album", and the "most vulnerable Cleopatrick song […] and the song that means the most to me out of anything I've written". After the album's released, they band also released a music video for "Victoria Park".

== Reception ==
Professional ratings
Review scores
| Source | Rating |
|---|---|
| Clash | 8/10 |
| Exclaim! | 7/10 |
| Kerrang! | 3/5 |

Bummer received generally positive reviews from music critics. Exclaim! praised the album's "excellent grooves", "unique energy" and "plenty of pounding, cathartic moments throughout", while Kerrang! praised the bands "titanic riffs", although criticised the way "the songs seem to meld into one another".

Metacritic assigned the album 72/100, based on five reviews.

== Track listing ==
All tracks are written by Cleopatrick unless otherwise stated.

| No. | Title | Writer(s) | Length |
|---|---|---|---|
| 1. | "Victoria Park" | | 2:59 |
| 2. | "The Drake" | | 3:25 |
| 3. | "Family Van" | | 2:55 |
| 4. | "Good Grief" | | 2:58 |
| 5. | "No Sweat" | | 2:54 |
| 6. | "Why July" | | 2:53 |
| 7. | "Ya" | | 0:32 |
| 8. | "Pepper's Ghost" | | 2:44 |
| 9. | "2008" | Cleopatrick; Jig Dubé | 3:54 |
| 10. | "Great Lakes" | Cleopatrick; Quinn Dubé | 3:23 |
| Total length: | | | 28:47 |

Notes

- All track titles are stylised in uppercase.

== Charts ==
| Chart | Peak position |
|---|---|
| UK Album Downloads (Official Charts) | 89 |

== Personnel ==
=== Cleopatrick ===
- Luke Gruntz – vocals, guitar, production
- Ian Fraser – drums, production

=== Other personnel ===
- Jig Dubé – production
- Spencer Sunshine – engineering
- Jonwayne – mixing
- Greg Calbi – mastering
- Steve Fallone – mastering
