= Choses Sauvages =

Canadian dance-punk group

Choses Sauvages is a Canadian dance-punk group from Montreal, Quebec. They are most noted for their 2025 album Choses Sauvages III, which was longlisted for the 2025 Polaris Music Prize.

The band consists of Félix Bélisle on vocals, bass and keyboards, Marc-Antoine Barbier on vocals, guitars and keyboards, Tommy Bélisle on vocalists and keyboards, Thierry Malépart on vocals, guitars and keyboards, and Philippe Gauthier Boudreau on vocals, drums and percussion.

They released the self-titled album Choses Sauvages in 2017. Choses Sauvages II followed in 2021, and Choses Sauvages III was released in 2025.

In 2019, they received a SOCAN Songwriting Prize nomination for the song "La valse des trottoirs", and a Félix Award nomination for Alternative Album of the Year at the 41st Félix Awards. In 2024, they received a Félix Award nomination for Video of the Year at the 46th Félix Awards, for "Pression".

Félix Bélisle is also a member of the side project La Sécurité.
