= Bibi Club =

Canadian musical duo

Bibi Club is a Canadian indie pop musical duo, consisting of Nicolas Basque and Adèle Trottier-Rivard.

Basque is a member of Plants and Animals, while Trottier-Rivard, the daughter of singer-songwriter Michel Rivard, has been principally a supporting vocalist with Plants and Animals and Ludovic Alarie, as well as with Louis-Jean Cormier.

== History ==
The duo fell in love and became a couple when Trottier-Rivard guested on a Plants and Animals recording. They launched Bibi Club in 2019, and released their self-titled debut EP that year. They followed this up in 2022 with the full-length album Le soleil et la mer on Secret City Records, which was later longlisted for the 2023 Polaris Music Prize.

The band's second album, Feu de garde, was released in 2024. It was shortlisted for the 2025 Polaris Music Prize.

Their third album, Amaro, followed in 2026. The album was shortlisted for the 2026 Polaris Music Prize.
