= All Cylinders =

Studio album by Yves Jarvis
- Released: February 28, 2025
- Genres: Indie R&B, indie rock
- Length: 26:20
- Labels: In Real Life Music; Next Door Records
- Producer: Yves Jarvis

Yves Jarvis chronology
The Zug (2022)	All Cylinders (2025)

All Cylinders is the fifth album by Canadian singer-songwriter Yves Jarvis, released on February 28, 2025.

In his initial announcement of the album release, Jarvis asserted that it was influenced by Serge Gainsbourg, Judee Sill, Sheryl Crow, Captain Beefheart, Jackson Browne, Throbbing Gristle, Ray Charles, Brian Eno, Fleetwood Mac and Panic! at the Disco.

== Critical response ==
Stuart Berman of Pitchfork rated the album 7.7/10, writing that "more than any specific musical influence, Jarvis' approach most readily recalls that of fellow Alberta native Cindy Lee, in the way both filter retro pop sounds through an internal dream logic to create something uniquely their own. The real joy of All Cylinders isn’t just in hearing an artist of avant-garde origin embrace the simple pleasures and language of pop music. It's in hearing him resist the tyranny of influence: Even as he siphons inspiration from the totemic musicians of the past 60 years, Yves Jarvis still can't sound like anyone but himself."

== Awards ==
The album was named the winner of the 2025 Polaris Music Prize. The song "Gold Filigree" was shortlisted for the Polaris SOCAN Song Prize.

It was shortlisted for the Juno Award for Alternative Album of the Year at the Juno Awards of 2026.

== Track listing ==
No.	Title	Length
1.	"With a Grain"	3:30
2.	"Gold Filigree"	3:24
3.	"One Gripe"	2:29
4.	"Decision Tree"	2:20
5.	"I've Been Mean"	2:39
6.	"I'm Your Boy"	3:19
7.	"Warp and Woof"	1:37
8.	"All Cylinders"	3:28
9.	"The Knife in Me"	2:04
10.	"Patina"	0:13
11.	"Luck's Last Luster"	1:12
