= Ribbon Skirt =

Canadian indie rock duo

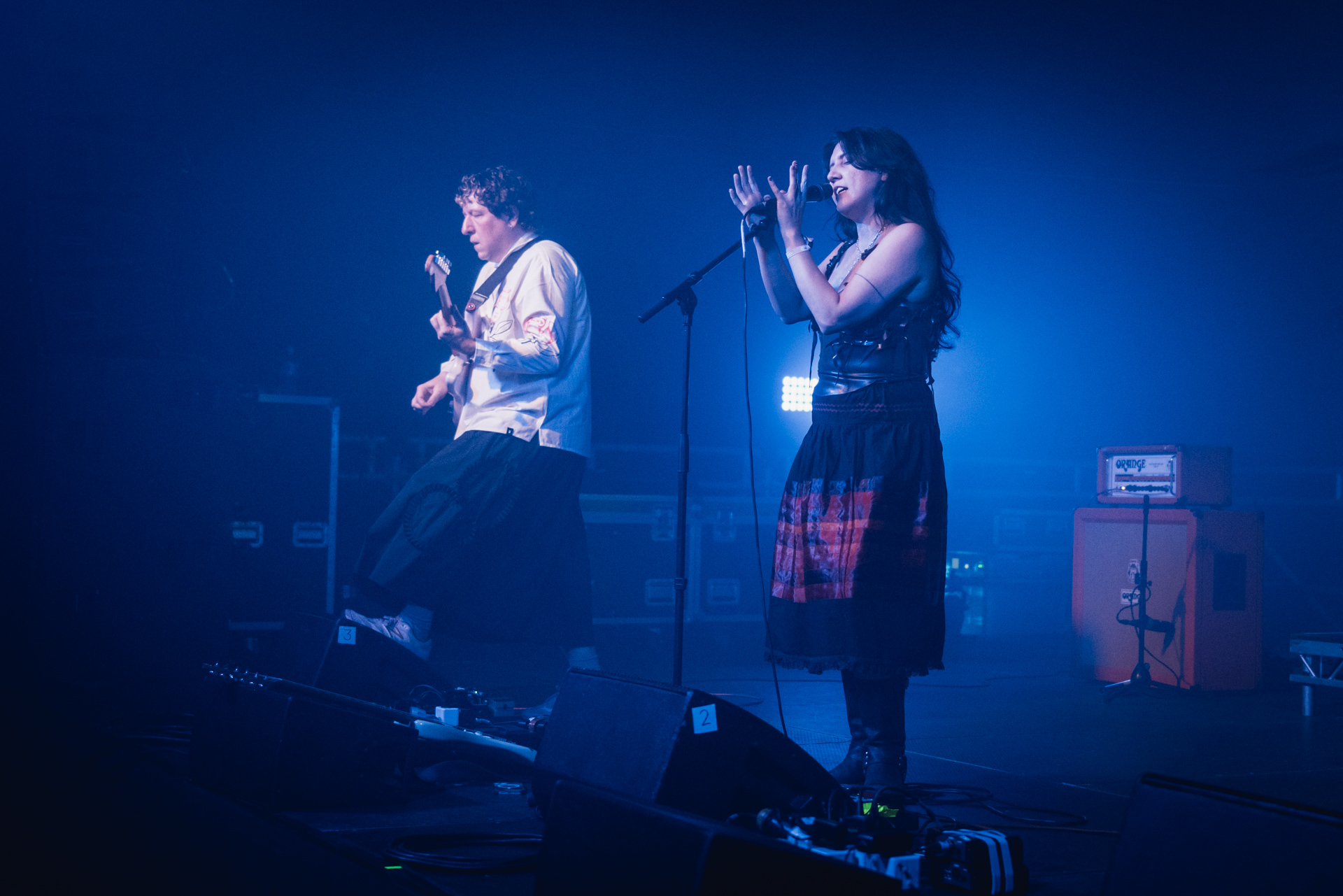
- in 2026

Background information
- Origin: Montreal, Quebec, Canada
- Years active: 2021–present
- Label: Mint Records

Ribbon Skirt is a Canadian indie rock duo from Montreal, Quebec, consisting of vocalist and guitarist Tashiina Buswa (Anishinaabe) and multi-instrumentalist Billy Riley. They are most noted for their album Bite Down, which was shortlisted for the 2025 Polaris Music Prize.

Initially known as Love Language, the duo released two EPs under that name before adopting the name Ribbon Skirt in reference to Buswa's Anishinaabe heritage. Bite Down, their full-length debut, was released in April 2025 on Mint Records to critical acclaim. Their follow-up EP, PENSACOLA, is set for release on October 3, 2025, also via Mint Records, and is described by the band as an epilogue to Bite Down.

== Discography ==
=== as Love Language ===
- Trying to Reach You (2021)
- Indian Cowboy (2023)

=== as Ribbon Skirt ===
- Bite Down (2025)
- PENSACOLA (2025)
