= Sister Ray (singer) =

Métis singer-songwriter

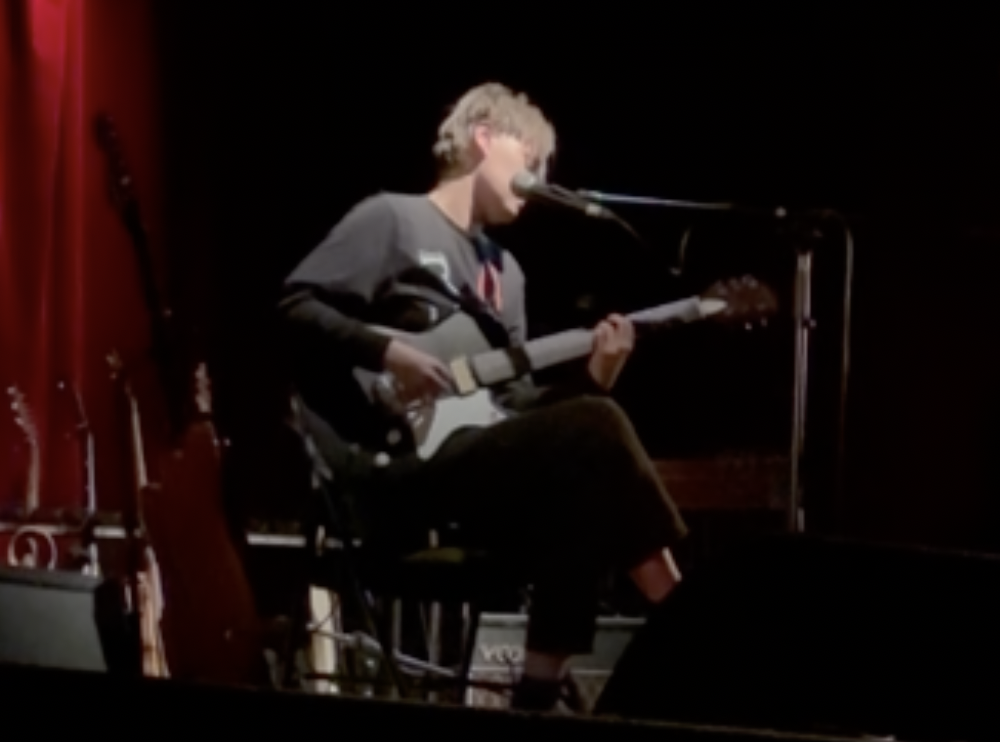
Coyes performing in Montréal, Québec in 2025 opening for Georgia Harmer at Sala Rossa.

Sister Ray is the stage name of Ella Coyes, a Métis singer-songwriter. They were born and raised in Sturgeon County, Alberta. Their stage name was taken from The Velvet Underground song of the Sister Ray. Their debut full-length album Communion was released in May 2022 on Royal Mountain Records, and was longlisted for the 2022 Polaris Music Prize. Coyes has been based in Toronto, Ontario since 2020.

Coyes previously released the EP Untitled in 2017 which was partly improvised and recorded live.

Communion received a score of 7.0/10 from Pitchfork in 2022.

Believer was longlisted for the 2025 Polaris Music Prize.

Believer was nominated for the 2026 Juno Award for Adult Contemporary Album of the Year.

== Discography ==
=== Studio albums ===
- Communion (2022)
- Believer (2025)

=== EPs ===
- Untitled (2017)
- Teeth (2023)
