= Yves Jarvis =

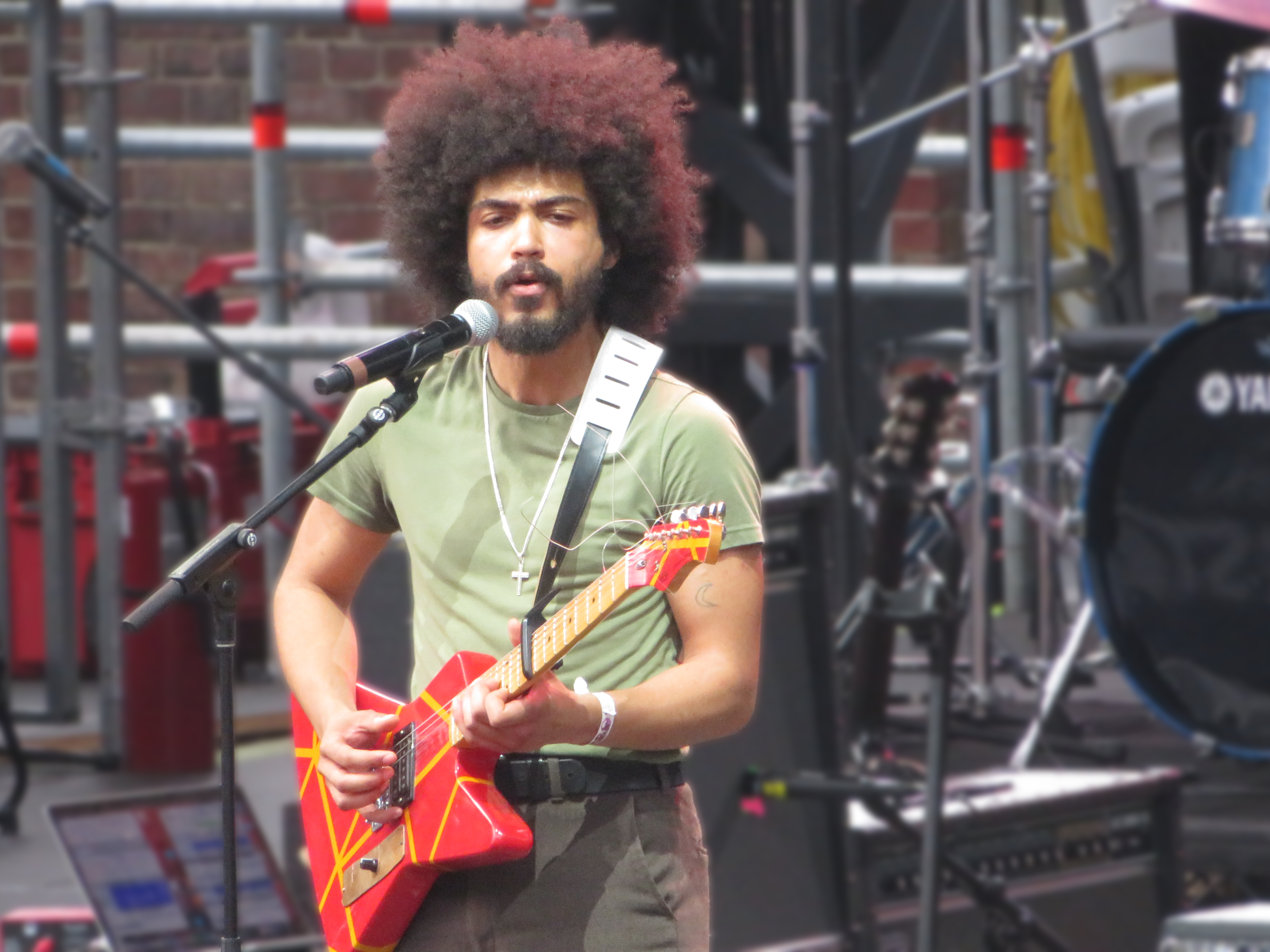
- Jarvis in 2023

Background information
- Born: Jean-Sébastien Yves Audet
- Genre: Experimental rock
- Labels: Flemish Eye, Anti-, Bruised Tongue

Jean-Sébastien Yves Audet, known professionally as Yves Jarvis, is a Canadian experimental musician, singer, and producer who also previously released music under the stage names Un Blonde and Faux Fur.

Jarvis in 2019.

== Biography ==
Originally from Calgary, Alberta, Audet was a member of various projects in his teens including Faux Fur, which released a self-titled debut in 2013. His first solo album as Un Blonde, Tenet, was released in 2014. He followed up in 2016 with Good Will Come to You, which was a longlisted nominee for the 2016 Polaris Music Prize. The album was reissued in 2017 on Flemish Eye.

Audet announced in 2018 that he was changing his stage name from Un Blonde to Yves Jarvis, and released his third album The Same but by Different Means in early 2019 on Flemish Eye in Canada and ANTI- in the rest of the world. The album was longlisted for the 2019 Polaris Music Prize.

His 2020 album, Sundry Rock Song Stock, was released to critical acclaim. The album was longlisted for the 2021 Polaris Music Prize.

His 2025 album All Cylinders was named the winner of the 2025 Polaris Music Prize, and was shortlisted for the Juno Award for Alternative Album of the Year at the Juno Awards of 2026.

== Name ==
Audet changed his project name from Un Blonde to Yves Jarvis in 2018, explaining "Yves is my middle name and Jarvis is my mother's maiden name"

== Discography ==
=== Albums ===
- The Same but by Different Means (2019)
- Sundry Rock Song Stock (2020)
- The Zug (2022)
- All Cylinders (2025)

=== As Un Blonde ===
- Tenet (2014)
- Good Will Come to You (2016)

=== As Lightman Jarvis Ecstatic Band (with Romy Lightman) ===
- Banned (2021)
