= Cleopatrick =

Canadian rock duo

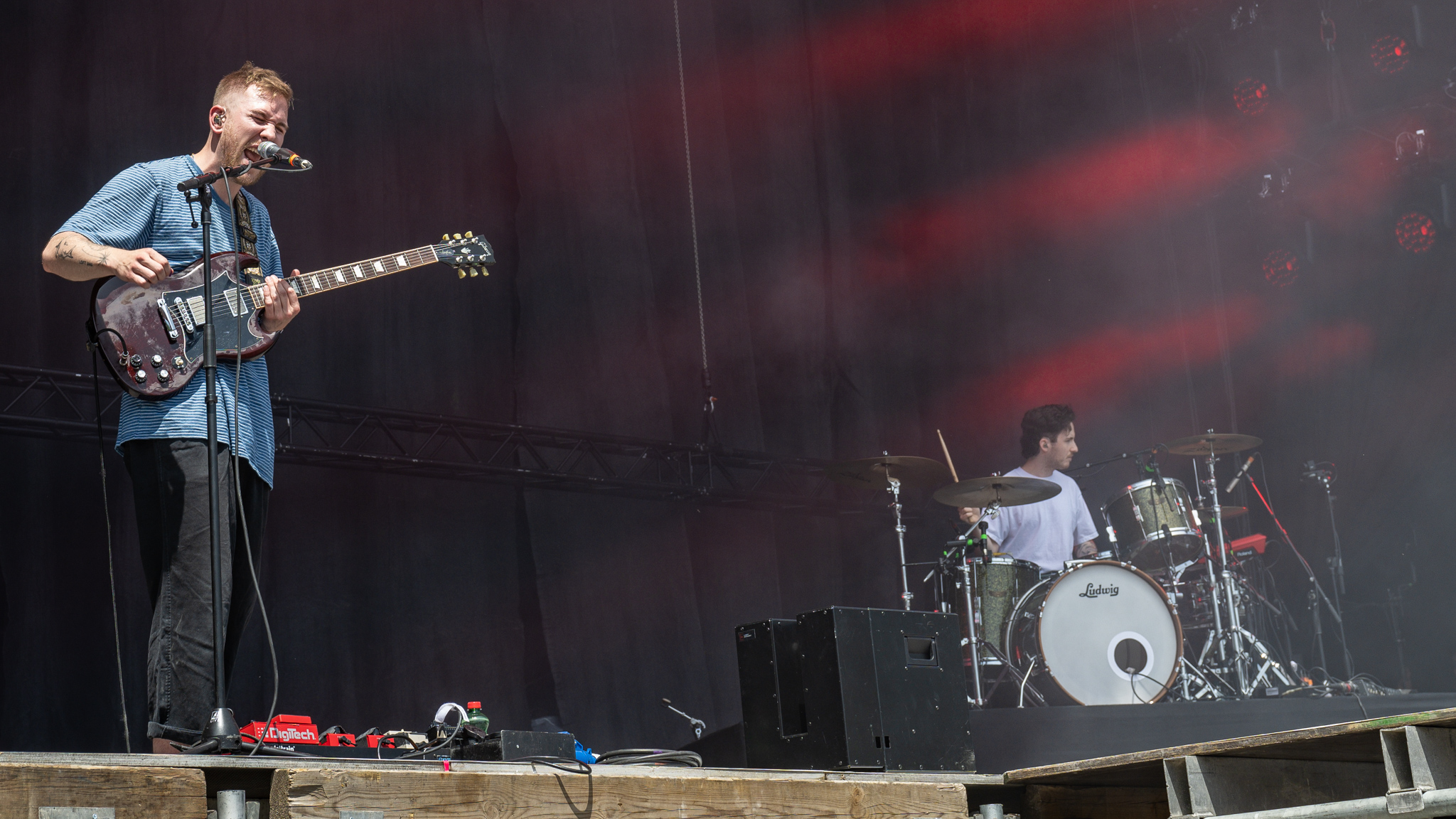
- Cleopatrick performing at Rock im Park 2023 in Nuremberg, Germany

Background information
- Origin: Cobourg, Ontario, Canada
- Genres: Alternative rock; indie rock; grunge; blues rock; hard rock
- Years active: 2015–present
- Label: Nowhere Special Recordings
- Members: Luke Gruntz; Ian Fraser
- Website: www.cleopatrick.com

Cleopatrick (stylized in lowercase) is a Canadian rock duo based in Cobourg, Ontario. They released their debut album, Bummer, on June 4, 2021 and three EPs by their own record label, called Nowhere Special Recordings. Their second album, Fake Moon, was released on March 14, 2025.

== Background ==
Childhood friends Ian Fraser and Luke Gruntz grew up in Cobourg, Ontario, had been friends since age 4 and began getting interested in music around age 8 when they first listened to AC/DC. Later in their teens they began recording their own music.

Their debut EP, titled "14" was released on February 14, 2016, though they began to gain popularity with single "Hometown". Released in 2017, it peaked at No. 6 on the US Mainstream Rock Charts. It was taken from their second EP, The Boys, which was released on June 29, 2018. The band's first music festival was the 2018 instalment of Lollapalooza in Chicago, and continuing into 2019 they played many festivals, including 2000 Trees Festival in England and Shaky Knees Music Festival in Atlanta, Non-album single "sanjake" was released in March 2019.

On December 11, 2020, they released the single "Good Grief", the first single of their debut album, titled Bummer. This was followed on March 11, 2021 with second single "THE DRAKE". The third single, "FAMILY VAN" was released on April 20, 2021 alongside the announcement of their debut album, which was released on June 4, 2021.

Cleopatrick began an extensive European tour throughout March 2022, including a performance at the Electric Ballroom in London. Following their European tour, they went on to support British rock Duo Royal Blood during their North American tour between April 18, 2022 and May 24, 2022. Following that tour, Cleopatrick performed at multiple European festivals including Reading and Leeds on the August 26 and 27, 2022, respectively.

The single, "OK" was released on August 23, 2022, part of their 5-song EP Doom which released on October 21, 2022.

On November 1, 2024, the band released the single "HAMMER", the first single from Fake Moon On January 22, 2025 the second single of the album, "PLEASE", was released on all platforms. This coincided with the official announcement of "FAKE MOON", their second studio album Fake Moon was released on March 14, 2025.

== Musical style ==
The band has drawn comparisons in their sound and personal reflection of music to bands such as Highly Suspect, Royal Blood, Arctic Monkeys, and Catfish and the Bottlemen.

The band has stated AC/DC and Highly Suspect, as well as fellow Canadian alternative rock bands Zig Mentality and Ready the Prince, as their biggest musical influences. They also cite the stylings and musical risk taking associated with modern hip hop and its production.

== Discography ==
=== Studio albums ===
Title	Album details	Peak chart positions
Title	Album details	UK Downloads
Bummer	Released: 4 June 2021; Label: Nowhere Special Recordings; Formats: Digital download, CD, LP	89
Fake Moon	Released: 14 March 2025; Label: Nowhere Special Recordings; Formats: Digital download, CD, LP	
Scrap	Released: 5 December 2025; Label: Nowhere Special Recordings; Formats: Digital download	

=== Extended plays ===
Title	EP details
"14"	Released: 14 February 2016; Label: Nowhere Special Recordings; Formats: Digital download
The Boys	Released: 29 June 2018; Label: Nowhere Special Recordings; Formats: Digital download
Doom	Released: 21 October 2022; Label: Nowhere Special Recordings; Formats: Digital download
2 Doom Demos	Released: 20 October 2023; Label: Nowhere Special Recordings; Formats: Digital download

=== Singles ===
Year	Title	Peak chart positions			Album
Year	Title	US Main. Rock	CAN Rock	UK	Album
2016	"City Kids"	–	–	–	"14"
2017	"Hometown"	6	6	– (Note: "Hometown" did not enter the UK Singles Chart, but peaked at number 83 on the UK Physical Singles Chart.)	The Boys
2018	"Bernard Trigger"	–	–	–	The Boys
2018	"Daphne Did It" / "The Depths"	–	–	–	The Boys
2018	"Youth"	–	–	–	The Boys
2019	"Sanjake"	–	–	–	Non-album singles
2020	"Good Grief"	–	–	–	Bummer
2021	"The Drake"	–	–	–	Bummer
2021	"Family Van"	32	45	–	Bummer
2021	"2008"	–	–	–	Bummer
2022	"OK"	–	–	–	Doom
2025	"GUTS"	–	–	–	Scrap
2025	"BURNER PHONE"	-	-	-	Scrap
2026	"WHAAT"	-	-	-	CP3

=== Music videos ===
List of music videos, showing year released and director(s)
Title	Year	Director(s)	Ref.
"City Kids"	2016	Hardy Media	
"Hometown"	2017	Kurtis Watson	
"Daphne Did It"	2018	Mark Boucher	
"Sanjake"	2019	cleopatrick	
"Hometown" (version 2)	2020	cleopatrick & Mika Matinazad	
"Good Grief"	2020	cleopatrick	
"Family Van"	2021	Boy Wonder	
"2008"	2021	Shuyler Nazareth	
"Victoria Park"	2021	Boy Wonder	
"No Sweat"	2022	Boy Wonder	
"Scaring Me"	2022	cleopatrick	
"WHAAT"	2026	cleopatrick & Adit Dixit	

== Members ==
- Luke Gruntz – vocals, guitar, production
- Ian Fraser – drums, production
