= Optikz =

Australian-Canadian rapper, singer, and songwriter (born 1983)

Background information
- Born: Darren Gregory Piper; 21 February 1983 (age 43); Cairns, Queensland, Australia
- Origin: Guelph, Ontario, Canada
- Genres: Hip-hop
- Occupations: Rapper; singer; songwriter
- Years active: 1999–present
- Labels: Royal City Records; Systematix Records; Lions Heart Records
- Formerly of: RCR
- Website: optikzofficial.com

Darren Gregory Piper (born February 21, 1983), known professionally as Optikz, is an Australian–Canadian rapper, singer, and songwriter. Active since the late 1990s, he began his career in the underground hip hop scene in Guelph, Ontario.

== Early life ==
Born in Cairns, Queensland, Australia, Piper relocated with his family to Guelph, Ontario, Canada, in 1990. During his teenage years, he became involved in local hip‑hop and skateboarding cultures and was active as a breakdancer. A severe ankle injury sustained while skateboarding, followed by a spine condition that required reconstructive surgery, ended his plans for a skateboarding career. During his recovery, Piper began writing lyrics and adopted the moniker Optikz.

In the late 1990s, Optikz co‑founded the independent record label Royal City Records and the hip‑hop group RCR in Guelph. In 2001, RCR performed as the opening act for Canadian hip‑hop artists including IRS, Concise, and the Juno Award‑winning hip‑hop group, the Rascalz. The group released their debut album, Royal City Records Presents… RCR, in 2002 and later disbanded.

After the dissolution of RCR, Optikz pursued a solo career. He enrolled in the Independent Music Production program at Seneca College in Toronto, graduating in 2006. He subsequently founded Systematix Records to release his own work.

== Career ==
In the mid‑2000s, Optikz's solo career progressed with the release of his first underground album, Area Fifty One Nine Covert Ops (2005). The following year, he achieved regional notice with the single "Coming From The Cold," produced by Juno Award‑winner Classified.

In 2006, Optikz won two Top 40 radio talent competitions: Magic 106.1 FM’s "Royal City Sings" contest and 91.5 The Beat’s "Rhythm of the Future Talent Search," leading to work with Juno Award‑winner Marcus Kane on his single "Rise Up" and opening slots for prominent artists. He performed at Hiphoptoberfest in Kitchener, opening for Snow, k‑os, and Jelleestone. In 2007, he was an opening act for Nas’ Hip Hop Is Dead tour at Centre in the Square in Kitchener, Ontario, which also featured K'naan and Elephant Man. His second independent album, Focusin, was released in 2008 on his own Lions Heart Records label. Exclaim! magazine acknowledged the album's polished production and honesty but found its thematic focus repetitive. The single "Break" received airplay on MuchMusic, and another track, "Let's Stay Together," held the No. 1 position on Galaxie Satellite Radio's hip‑hop chart for seven weeks in 2007.

In the early 2010s, Optikz wrote and performed a theme song for the national retailer Mark's, formerly Mark's Work Wearhouse, and in 2014 wrote "Go Gryphs Go," the official theme song for the University of Guelph Gryphons varsity teams. During this period, he also created radio ads for Vegehut Bakery Ltd and Arch.

After a hiatus, Optikz refocused on his own music in the late 2010s, recording new material at Metalworks Studios in Mississauga, Ontario. In 2019, he founded Grey Wall Sound, a professional recording studio in Guelph. Later, Optikz released a series of singles that explored themes of healing and personal trauma, including "Love The Child In Me" (2019), "Dark" (2019), and "So Long Goodbye" (2021). His songwriting gained international recognition when "Love The Child In Me" was selected as a finalist in the 2023 USA Songwriting Competition and received an honorable mention in the International Songwriting Competition.

In 2025, Optikz released his official debut studio extended play, The Optikz EP. The project was preceded by the single "Love The Child In Me", released in May 2019 which placed as a finalist in the 28th Annual 2023 USA Songwriting Competition and also placed as a finalist in the 2025 Unsigned Only Music Awards In 2025 Optikz released the single "Champion" on May 7. "The Optikz EP" was then released on November 7. His single "Champion" was placed as a finalist in the 2025 30th Annual USA Songwriting Competition as well.

== Discography ==
Studio albums

- Area Fifty One Nine: Covert Ops (2005)
- Focusin (2008)
- Destiny (2011)

EPs

- The Optikz EP (2025)
