= City of Clowns =

Studio album by Marie Davidson
- Released: February 28, 2025
- Genre: Techno; experimental pop
- Length: 52:47
- Label: Deewee
- Producer: Marie Davidson; Soulwax; Pierre Guerineau

Marie Davidson chronology
Renegade Breakdown (2020)	City of Clowns (2025)

Singles from City of Clowns
- 1. "Fun Times" Released: February 26, 2025; 2. "Y.A.A.M." Released: February 26, 2025; 3. "Contrarian" Released: February 26, 2025; 4. "Sexy Clown" Released: February 26, 2025

City of Clowns is the sixth studio album by Canadian electronic musician Marie Davidson. It was released on February 28, 2025, by Deewee.

== Background ==
Incorporating a mixture of techno, spoken word and pop, City of Clowns was produced and written with Belgian electronic band Soulwax and Pierre Guerineau. Consisting of nine songs, the album's background is based on the themes of technology and data. It was preceded by the singles, "Fun Times", "Y.A.A.M.", "Contrarian", and "Sexy Clown".

== Reception ==
Professional ratings
Review scores
Source	Rating
AllMusic	4/5 stars
MusicOMH	4/5 stars
Clash Magazine	8/10 stars
Pitchfork	8.1/10

AllMusic rated the album four out of five stars and stated "Channeling technological paranoia, City of Clowns contains some of Davidson's most futuristic work yet, as well as some of her most commanding and personality-driven." Paper Magazine described it as "a dance floor-ready exposé of our big tech reality unpacking of how social platforms commodify our data and digital labor," while BrooklynVegan referred to it as "an instant dance classic, a concept record that works even without knowing that there is one, and may make you dance while doing the dishes."

London-based magazine MusicOMH remarked "This is an album capturing the dark, dystopian terrors of a world driven by power, greed and technology, the latter left to run roughshod over many elements of humanity." Exclaim! commented that "her new album is a total blast, with politically charged speak-singing that adds a wry humanism to the main attraction, which is unquestionably her thundering dance beats."

British magazine The Skinny referred to it as "a rallying call for a more humane digital future, redirecting the euphoric energy of the club toward creative ends." The Quietus described it as "a terrific, wholly self-assured record that remains defiantly human in the age of ubiquitous AI," while Resident Advisor commented that "City of Clowns is the realisation of how she's refined her own persona-product over the years."

Clash Magazine assigned it a rating of eight out of ten, remarking that "the album reminds listeners to question and demonstrate awareness, whilst musically reaches new heights for the producer." Anna Gaca of Pitchfork stated that "the album's philosophical basis underlines something that's become stunningly obvious recently: Global tech is in ethical, moral, and political decline."

The album was shortlisted for the 2025 Polaris Music Prize.

== Track listing ==
All tracks written and produced by Marie Davidson, Pierre Guerineau and Soulwax, except where noted.

No.	Title	Length
1.	"Validations Weight"	4:14
2.	"Demolition"	5:08
3.	"Sexy Clown"	4:54
4.	"Push Me Fuckhead"	5:38
5.	"Fun Times"	4:13
6.	"Statistical Modelling"	3:58
7.	"Y.A.A.M." (Davidson, Guerineau)	3:17
8.	"Contrarian"	5:40
9.	"Unknowing"	15:45
Total length:		52:47

== Charts ==
Chart (2025)	Peak position
UK Dance Albums (OCC)	4
UK Independent Albums (OCC)	33
