= Nemahsis =

Palestinian-Canadian singer (born 1994)

- Born: Nemah Hasan; January–March 1994 (age 32); Toronto, Ontario, Canada
- Genres: Pop; alt-pop; indie-pop; indie-folk
- Occupations: Singer; songwriter
- Years active: 2021–present
- Website: nemahsis.com

Nemah Hasan (Arabic: نعمة حسن, romanized: Niʿmah Ḥasan; born 1994), known professionally as Nemahsis, is a Palestinian-Canadian singer-songwriter from Toronto, Ontario. She independently released her debut album Verbathim on September 13, 2024, which won the 2025 Juno Award Alternative Album of the Year and was shortlisted for the 2025 Polaris Music Prize.

== Early life ==
Nemah Hasan was born in Toronto, Ontario, and raised on a farm in the nearby town of Milton. She is the daughter of Palestinian immigrants and is Bedouin from her father's side. As a child, Hasan's parents kept her from wearing her hijab in fear she would be bullied, to which she began hiding it in her backpack and putting it on at her bus stop.

== Career ==
Hasan began her career on TikTok, posting beauty and fashion videos aimed at Muslim women alongside occasional videos of her singing Adele covers. After being exploited by a company that hired her for an advertising campaign and then failed to pay her, in June 2021 she released her first original single and video "What If I Took It Off for You?", about social attitudes toward Muslim women who wear the hijab. She followed up with the singles "Paper Thin" in October 2021 and "Dollar Signs" in January 2022, before releasing the EP Eleven Achers (stylized in all lowercase) in March 2022. The EP was listed as one of the best extended plays of 2022 by Exclaim!. She followed up with the new non-EP singles "Criminal" in October 2022 and "I Wanna Be Your Right Hand" in February 2023.

In May 2024, Hasan released the single "Stick of Gum" for her debut album; the song's music video was shot entirely in her family's hometown of Jericho in the occupied West Bank. The single was selected by Spotify editors as one of the best songs of 2024. In the summer, she released the singles "You Wore It Better", "Fine Print", and "Coloured Concrete". "Coloured Concrete" was listed as one of the "25 Best Canadian Songs of 2024" by Billboard Canada.

On September 13, 2024, Hasan independently released her debut album Verbathim. Hasan stated the title "Verbathim is just the word verbatim except someone is grabbing my tongue" to symbolize the censorship she has faced. The album was listed by CBC Music as number three in the top 15 best Canadian albums of that year.

In March 2025, Hasan was awarded Artist of the Year by non-profit organization Women in Music Canada. She also won Breakthrough Artist of the Year and Alternative Album of the Year for Verbathim at the 2025 Juno Awards. The album was also shortlisted for the 2025 Polaris Music Prize. In September, Nemahsis was announced as a recipient of the Canadian Songwriters Hall of Fame's 2025 Breakthrough Songwriter Award.

On October 17, 2025, Nemahsis released an official cover of "Team", originally by Lorde. In April 2026, Nemahsis announced her next single was titled "Paper Soldiers".

== Artistry ==
Hasan's music has been compared to that of musicians Mitski, Fiona Apple, and FKA Twigs. She claims to have been inspired by singer-songwriter Feist's "approach to pop music". Her influences also include Amy Winehouse, Billie Holiday, Charli XCX, Fiona Apple and Marina Diamandis.

== Activism ==
On October 12, 2023, soon after the October 7 attacks, the singer shared on social media that she had been dropped by her label, stating "My label just dropped me, a Palestinian artist, for being pro-Palestine." Her subsequent posts included a rendition of "Team", originally by New Zealand artist Lorde, with images from Gaza before and after the bombardments; the music video, which was released two years later, was dedicated to the memory of Palestinian journalists Saleh al-Jafarawi and Anas Al-Sharif, who were both targeted and killed by Israel during the war.

== Discography ==
=== Albums ===
Title	Details
Verbathim	Released: September 13, 2024; Formats: LP, digital download, streaming

=== EPs ===
Title	Details
Eleven Achers	Released: March 11, 2022; Formats: Digital download, streaming; Track listing: 1. "Immigrant's Tale"; 2. "Suicide"; 3. "Dollar Signs"; 4. "I'm Not Gonna Kill You"; 5. "Paper Thin"; 6. "Hold On To Me"

=== Singles ===
List of singles as lead artist, showing year released and name of the album
Title	Year	Album
"What If I Took It Off for You?"	2021	Non-album single
"Paper Thin"	2021	Eleven Achers
"Dollar Signs"	2022	Eleven Achers
"Criminal"	2022	Non-album singles
"I Wanna Be Your Right Hand"	2023	Non-album singles
"Stick of Gum"	2024	Verbathim
"You Wore It Better"	2024	Verbathim
"Fine Print"	2024	Verbathim
"Coloured Concrete"	2024	Verbathim
"Team"	2025	Non-album singles
"Paper Soldiers"	2026	Non-album singles

== Awards and nominations ==
Award	Year	Nominee / Work	Category	Result	Ref.
SOCAN	2022	"Paper Thin"	SOCAN Songwriting Prize	Nominated	
Prism Prize	2023	Nemahsis	Hi-Fidelity Award	Won	
Prism Prize	2024	"I Wanna Be Your Right Hand"	Audience Award	Won	
Canadian Songwriters Hall of Fame Breakthrough Songwriter Award	2025	Nemahsis	Non-French-language	Won	
Juno Awards	2025	Nemahsis	Songwriter of the Year	Nominated	
Juno Awards	2025	Nemahsis	Breakthrough Artist of the Year	Won	
Juno Awards	2025	Verbathim	Alternative Album of the Year	Won	
Polaris Music Prize	2025	Verbathim	Best Canadian Album	Nominated (Short-listed)	
Women in Music Honours	2025	Nemahsis	Artist of the Year	Won	

=== Listicles ===
Name of publisher, year(s) listed, name of listicle, recipient, and placement result
Publisher	Year	Listicle	Recipient	Placement	Ref.
Exclaim!	2022	Exclaim!'s 15 Best EPs of 2022	Eleven Achers	Placed	
Billboard Canada	2024	25 Best Canadian Songs of 2024	"Coloured Concrete"	Placed	
CBC Music	2024	The 15 best Canadian albums of 2024	Verbathim	3	
Spotify	2024	Editor's Picks: Best Songs of 2024	"Stick of Gum"	Placed	
Rolling Stone	2025	The Future 25	Nemahsis	Placed	
