= Art d'Ecco =

Musician / singer songwriter

- Born: Ottawa, Ontario, Canada
- Genres: Indie rock, glam rock, post-punk revival
- Occupation: Musician
- Instruments: Vocals, guitar, keyboards, bass
- Years active: 2016-present
- Label: Paper Bag Records
- Formerly of: Speed to Kill
- Website: https://artdeccomusic.ca/

Art d'Ecco is the stage name of a Canadian indie rock singer and musician, based in Victoria, British Columbia. His music has been compared to David Bowie, The Cure, and Sparks.

d'Ecco's birth name is not currently known to the public, but he has revealed that he was born in Ottawa, Ontario and raised in Vancouver, British Columbia. After working as a restaurant line cook in his teens, he began to look into music as a career, playing in the band Speed to Kill with Vancouver musician Jason Corbett.

d'Ecco played in bands for a number of years without seeing much progress. Eventually his father offered to put him up at the family home in the Gulf Islands where he would care for his grandmother, then ailing with Alzheimer's disease. It was during this time of retreat that he wrote the songs that would make up his solo debut as Art d'Ecco, Day Fevers. d'Ecco recorded this album solo with a piano and an iPhone.

After releasing and touring with Day Fevers, d'Ecco began to experiment with his image, inspired by his fascination with artists that "look weird", citing Iggy Pop and Deerhunter. By the time he released his second album, 2018's Trespasser, his first release with Paper Bag Records, he had arrived at his signature look of bob wig and androgynous makeup. His promotion for the album included a set at the 2019 Bumbershoot festival.

In 2021 d'Ecco released his third album, In Standard Definition, which was recorded in analog on a 50-year-old console. It has been described as "a concept album about entertainment." As a follow-up d'Ecco released a cover single of The Jam's "That's Entertainment".

d'Ecco's fourth album, Serene Demon, launched on February 14, 2025, was longlisted for the 2025 Polaris Music Prize.

== Album discography ==
- Day Fevers (Your Face Records, 2016)
- Trespasser (Paper Bag Records, 2018)
- In Standard Definition (Paper Bag Records, 2021)
- After the Headrush (Paper Bag Records, 2022)
- Serene Demon (Paper Bag Records, 2025)
- Scheele's Green (Paper Bag Records, 2026)
