= Quinton Barnes =

Canadian singer, rapper and producer

Quinton Barnes is a Canadian singer, rapper, and producer whose music blends hip hop, rhythm and blues and electronic elements. He is most noted for his 2025 album Code Noir, which was longlisted for the 2025 Polaris Music Prize.

Originally from Kitchener, Ontario, he is currently based in Montreal, Quebec.

He released his debut album Aarupa in 2020, and followed up with As a Motherfucker in 2021.

== Discography ==
- Aarupa – 2020
- As a Motherfucker – 2021
- For the Love of Drugs – 2022
- Have Mercy on Me – 2024
- Code Noir – 2025
- Black Noise – 2025
