= Bells Larsen =

Canadian singer-songwriter

- Larsen performing in 2025

Background information
- Born: 1997 or 1998 (age 28–29); Toronto, Ontario, Canada
- Genres: indie folk; singer-songwriter
- Occupations: musician; singer; songwriter
- Instruments: voice; guitar
- Years active: 2021–present
- Labels: Next Door Records; Royal Mountain Records
- Website: Official website

Bells Larsen (born 1997 or 1998) is a Canadian singer-songwriter, originally from Toronto, Ontario, and currently based in Montreal, Quebec.

== Early life and family ==
Bells Larson was born in Toronto. The son of children's author Andrew Larsen, Larsen attended Rosedale Heights School of the Arts, where he (Note: Larsen uses he/him and they/them pronouns. This article uses he/him for consistency.) was a classmate of singer-songwriter Georgia Harmer. His younger brother is actor Charlie Henry Larsen, known for his role in the show Overcompensating.

== Career ==
Larsen released his debut album, Good Grief, in 2022. The music was largely inspired by the death of his first love. At the time he identified as non-binary, but had begun to pursue a gender transition by the album's release.

He followed up in 2023 with If I Was, I Am, an EP featuring the first songs recorded in his new masculine vocal register. In 2024, he released a cover of Rostam Batmanglij's "Bike Dream" as a standalone single.

He subsequently signed to Royal Mountain Records, which released his second full-length album Blurring Time in 2025. Conceived as a more direct and personal exploration of his transition than his previous releases, Larsen recorded vocals before beginning hormone replacement therapy in 2022, and then waited for his voice to drop before resuming the recording process in 2023. He then worked with Harmer to create new vocal harmony arrangements so that the album would feature vocal duets between his pre-transition and post-transition voices.

The album was to have been supported by a concert tour of both Canada and the United States; however, following Donald Trump's flurry of anti-transgender executive orders, Larsen was forced to cancel the American dates on the tour rather than risk being detained at the border over issues with the gender marker on his passport. The Canadian shows on his tour itinerary proceeded normally.

Blurring Time was longlisted for the 2025 Polaris Music Prize. In May 2026, Larsen released a short film tilted Blurring Time (the documentary), based on the 2025 album.

In 2025, Larsen, his father Andrew, and illustrator Tallulah Fontaine published the children's book Call Me Gray. The book was a finalist for the Governor General's Award for Young People's Literature - Illustrated Books at the 2026 Governor General's Awards.

== Artistry ==
Larsen cites Elliott Smith, Nick Drake, Sufjan Stevens, and Adrianne Lenker as major influences in his music.

== Personal life ==
Larsen is a trans man.

== Discography ==
- Good Grief (2022)
- If I Was, I Am (2023)
- Blurring Time (2025)
