= Sophie Kemp =

American writer

- Education: Oberlin College
- Employer: Columbia University
- Website: www.sophiefkemp.com

Sophie Frances Kemp is an American writer.

She graduated from Oberlin College. She teaches at Columbia University.

Her work appeared in The Paris Review, Granta, and Vogue.

== Works ==
- Paradise Logic, ISBN 9781668057032, Simon & Schuster, 2025.
