= Gloin (band) =

Canadian post-punk noise rock band

- Origin: Toronto, Ontario, Canada
- Genres: Noise rock, post-punk
- Years active: 2018–present
- Label: Mothland
- Members: John Watson; Vic Byers; Simon Kou; Richard Garnham; Kalina Nedelcheva

Gloin are a Canadian post-punk noise rock band from Toronto, Ontario. They are most noted for their 2025 studio album All of Your Anger Is Actually Shame (And I Bet That Makes You Angry), which was longlisted for the 2025 Polaris Music Prize.

The band consists of vocalist and guitarist John Watson, bassist and vocalist Vic Byers, drummer Simon Kou and keyboardist Kalina Nedelcheva. They released their debut studio album We Found This in 2022, and followed up with their second studio album All of Your Anger Is Actually Shame (And I Bet That Makes You Angry), in 2025.

== Band members ==
- John Watson – vocals, guitar
- Vic Byers – bass, vocals
- Simon Kou – drums
- Richard Garnham – keyboards, guitar
- Kalina Nedelcheva – keyboards

== Discography ==
Studio albums

- We Found This (2022)
- All of Your Anger Is Actually Shame (And I Bet That Makes You Angry) (2025)
