= The Organ (band) =

Canadian post-punk band

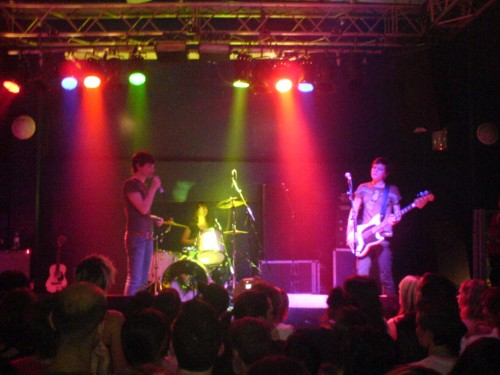
- The Organ live on stage

Background information
- Origin: Vancouver, British Columbia, Canada
- Genres: Post-punk; jangle pop; new wave
- Years active: 2001–2006
- Labels: Mint Records, 604 Records, Too Pure, Talitres, Popfrenzy
- Past members: Katie Sketch; Jenny Smyth; Debora Cohen; Shmoo Ritchie; Shelby Stocks; Ashley Webber; Sarah Efron

The Organ was a Canadian post-punk band formed in Vancouver in 2001. They officially broke up in 2006 due to illness and personal conflicts in the band.

The Organ's brand of post-punk and new wave music drew influence from bands such as the Cure and the Smiths. AllMusic considers the band's style to be "dark". The Organ deliberately attempted to differentiate itself from its contemporaries in terms of sound and style.

== History ==
=== Early years ===
The Organ were conceived in 2001 by frontwoman Katie Sketch in Vancouver, British Columbia. Sketch's musical training started at the age of three, when she began classical training on the violin. Her childhood was spent largely in ignorance of the underground sounds of The Smiths, The Cure, and Joy Division, whom The Organ would later often be favorably compared to. "Tiffany and Bon Jovi – that was my take on '80s music."

Sketch has said of the time of the formation of the band, when she and the band members were in their early to mid-twenties. "I was in a musical lull, I couldn't stand what I was listening to," naming Sleater-Kinney as one example. "The local scene was also pretty shitty, and of course the radio was brutal. Then, by total fluke, my mom's friend's husband, Ron Obvious, hired me to help with the audio wiring for a studio he was building for Bryan Adams." Obvious introduced Katie to the world of independent music, and what she calls "that '80s sound." He created mix-tapes of bands he thought she'd appreciate as a violinist (Roxy Music, Ultravox) and singers with an "amazing natural vocal pitch" (Siouxsie and the Banshees, Nina Hagen, Kate Bush). This job also led Sketch to Tara Nelson, the engineer who would later record the Organ's first EP.

It was at this time that Katie joined with her friends Sarah "Sketch" Efron (on bass and keyboards) and Barb "Sketch" Choit (Hammond organ, guitar, bass) to form the instrumental trio Full Sketch.

"I met Katie Sketch when we worked morning shifts at a wretched cinnamon bun shop," says Efron, "but we really became friends on a road trip where we ended up breaking down in the redneck town of Hermiston, Oregon. On this trip, we decided to form a band and call it Full Sketch." Katie, though she was already a proficient multi-instrumentalist, decided this would be a good time to try her hand at drums.

"The concept was, 'Let's start a band where you play an instrument that you've never played before.' It was basically drunken ridiculousness, but all of a sudden I felt like life made more sense. Sarah was involved in CiTR, and Barb was big into indie rock, so what started off as a joke got me out going to see shows. The way The Organ began was as an offshoot of Full Sketch—I wanted to take the same sound and do it with singing."

Efron was also the news director at UBC's CiTR, where she, Sketch and Choit co-hosted a raunchy late-night call-in program called The Dead Air Show.

After about a year, Barb Sketch left the band to focus on her career as an artist and Full Sketch ended. According to Katie Sketch, "Barb Sketch is now in suburban California. She's long forgotten her Canadian roots and lives on a ranch with her man and a team of horses." At this point, organist Jenny Smyth (born Genoa Smith), replaced Choit on keyboards. Together with Efron, they founded The Organ.

In 2001, a long audition process began. Eventually, Sketch "tired of auditions," and decided to "just hire some people." After finding a handful of like-minded musicians, Katie assigned them instruments and taught them to play. Taught is a relative term though—Debbie had been playing guitar for three years, and Sketch has expressed distaste in interviews when portrayed as a "music teacher" to the girls: "[The press seems] to think they had a lot of help or something, but mostly it's just the drive to be able to learn the instruments and play them," Sketch said. "[My teaching them] was maybe a half-an-hour, hour process."

=== Sinking Hearts EP ===
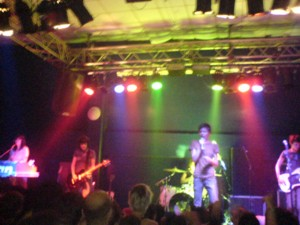
The Organ in concert

The full formation of the band that would appear on their first EP took three years. "It's not like the five of us got together and spontaneously created this," Sketch once commented in an interview. "Jenny and I had a direction we wanted to go in and then we slowly recruited people. We could tell if someone didn't get it, which is why we had to get rid of so many players. It's funny, sometimes people say the band's moving really quickly, but I feel like I've been doing this forever."

The original group eventually rounded out with Katie, Jenny, Sarah, drummer Shelby Stocks, and guitarist Debora Cohen. In summer 2002, The Organ made their debut with the release of the Sinking Hearts EP. The Canadian Press and indie publications across America praised The Organ's dreampop-inflected presentation. By January, The Organ was signed to Chad Kroeger's 604 imprint and Mint Records. However, before the year was out, Efron would leave to focus on her journalism career and be replaced by Ashley Webber.

"The rock n' roll lifestyle wasn't for me," said Efron, who is currently working for the financial section of The National Post, a conservative Canadian newspaper.

Even with the band finally complete and their first EP released, it would take years before they would release their first proper album; the process of writing and recording (the album would end up being pieced together in four different studios) would take years—two, to be exact, to finish up as Grab That Gun, an album that barely breaks a half hour in length and recycles four of its eleven tracks from Sinking Hearts.

"We knew we had a problem when the album was being mixed," comments Cohen. "When we heard it, we knew that it didn't sound like us. It was too, I don't know, crisp."

After much agonizing, the Organ decided to scrap the Dahle sessions and rerecord the album with producer Paul Forgues, who Sketch knew from her days at The Warehouse Studio.

"It was a really, really hard choice to make," Stocks says. "We had a window where we could have just released something that we weren't totally happy with. There was so much hype at that time, but we were like, 'No way. Let's fuck the hype and start over.' And I think that we ended up with a great album. I know that people who like us for being amateur and really simple are going to get it."

=== Grab That Gun ===
Despite several setbacks during the previous five years, the band developed a growing fan base. Their new material was released on the album Grab That Gun, which spent more time at number one on the Canadian campus radio charts than any other release that year.

That December (2004), Ashley Webber left the band.

"I think it's the usual reasons," explained Sketch in an interview. "I mean, I love Ashley, but we had different ideas. And then she wanted to try being in other musical projects, and we support her in that … [but our band has] got to be a high priority, I guess that's what it comes down to."

However, with their first international tour looming and no replacement in sight, Webber was asked back and subsequently rejoined the band in the new year.

The Organ began touring heavily across Canada, the United States and Europe. They also produced a music video for "Brother" (directed by Robert Morfitt), arguably the strongest of the seven new tracks appearing on the record. The video consisted of a straightforward montage of the band performing on a moodily lit stage. A fictitious reenactment of the video shoot for "Brother" can be seen during season two, episode two of the Showtime original series The L Word. "Brother" also appears on The L Word's season two soundtrack.

In July 2005, the standalone 7-inch single, Let the Bells Ring, was released on Go Metric Records. The title track was paired with a remix of "Memorize the City" by Dustin Hawthorne. Later that year, a second remix appeared on the French CD release of Grab That Gun.

During another North American tour promoting Grab That Gun, Ashley Webber left for good. She was then replaced with Katie Sketch's sister, Shmoo, who affirmed that she was "definitely permanent in the band" before it broke up in 2006.

On November 14, 2005, The Organ appeared live on BBC Radio 6 Music with their new bass player. They gave a brief interview and performed live renditions of the songs "Nothing I Can Do" and "Love, Love, Love." On November 27, a little over a week later, The Organ announced via their website that they had just been signed to Too Pure Records, through which Grab That Gun would be available throughout the world in February 2006.

The album cover was designed by David Cuesta at 7th Avenue house, and is based on a grid constructed around the Fibonacci sequence, to match musical scales. He also designed the logo based on sketches by Katie and Jenny.

=== Breaking up ===
On August 23, 2006, the band released a statement on MySpace saying they were canceling the remaining portion of their UK tour which included dates at the Reading and Leeds Festivals. The reason given was illness to a band member and they assured fans the band were not splitting up.

On December 7, 2006, the band released a statement on their MySpace and official site stating that they were breaking up. The statement read:

"We are sad to announce that we're breaking up. We want to thank our friends, fans, and family for all the support you gave to us. Thank you.
Shelby, Jenny, Katie, Debora, and Shmoo."

In an interview on CBC Radio 3 the following day, Jenny declined to discuss the reasons for the breakup saying that there were issues they preferred to keep private but implied that it had little or nothing to do with either geography or Katie's modeling career. "There were," she said, "so many reasons," she "wouldn't know where to start."

Two years later, Katie Sketch would later go on to detail the full story behind the break-up in a 2008 interview:

"When the band ended, I was really burnt out. I thought if I took a few months off then I wouldn't be burnt out, but now, when I think about it, I wouldn't have the energy to do touring right now. I just feel absolutely exhausted with it, and band politics, and all that stuff. I am still writing music, but it's not my first priority any more. [My first priority now is] getting my life back together. We'd been touring for so long and working so hard that I didn't know how to function on a daily basis. So just little things, like, I'm going to have breakfast today, or I'm going to the gym, or I'm going to get a job. I didn't really have any concept of how to do it any more […] I spent the majority of my twenties wanting to be in a band and it's all I ever thought about. And by the time the band ended I was in really bad health. Like drinking was a problem, and not knowing how to deal with personal crises. I was in bad shape. […] If a band is really supportive of one another and can help each other through things, it works really well, but at the end we were completely unable to communicate. We'd all become self-deprecating, we were fighting all the time... we were basically just drunk all the time. We had no time to separate, so it was like being in a bad domestic situation, all the time. […] When you're five girls touring in really terrible circumstances, where you're all in the same van and all sleep in the same hotel room every night, and you're drinking a lot, you have a lot of really fun times, but there's always fighting, there's always something going on. Towards the end, where things were becoming irreparable, it got to the point where we should have been in therapy as a group. And we should have taken breaks. And I knew that, and I was pushing for that. But the way our career had gone, we released the record in Canada, then somewhere else, then somewhere else, touring the same record. It was staggered, so we were always touring where the fanbase was hearing it for the first time. We built it like that, which is how a lot of bands do it, but it was gruelling. […] We were at that point where everyone in a band wants to get, right where the financial stuff isn't going to be such a big deal, where we'd be able to tour and take personal space, but our relationships had deteriorated so much by that point. […] It's like, you're doing everything that you dreamed of your whole life, and yet you've never been more miserable. You can't get away from these people. It's like you're married to them, basically. And we had other problems as well. What I consider to be a major part of our break-up is that this whole entire time that we were touring and doing all the stuff, we were never signed in the States. And to not have a record label in the States is to not have a career. We live in Canada so it's right there, but whenever we'd play in the States it would be to nobody. So we worked really, really hard to get a label in the States and when we finally had label interest there, and a label we wanted to sign to, our Canadian record label, who own our record, wouldn't let us go with what we wanted to do. It felt like we'd been busting our asses for however long, and we felt like we had no control. So what was going to happen? We'd finally sign in the States when I was 35, and we'd do gruelling tours then? You know what I mean? That was a major knock-down for us.

[…] By the end, I feel like everybody in the band was mentally ill. […] Quite frankly, I was not mentally well. […] I needed to get away from it, or something really bad was going to happen. […] We really needed a break and the record label, everybody, was pushing, pushing, pushing. And there's always the feeling that you're in financial debt too. The more you do it, the more money you make, and we felt like we owed it to people. And that's how management and the record company played it – "you kind of owe it to us to do another tour right now.

[After the breakup,] I moved to Toronto, had a mental breakdown, then I just got a job working for a doctor […] I interview people with drug problems, and alcoholics. […] Jenny the organ player just moved to Toronto and she and I bought a restaurant bar about two months ago. We're renovating it and we live above it in a teeny weeny apartment together. […] It'll be a brunch place in the day, and we have a liquor license so it will be a bar at night. [Now that Jenny and I live together,] it's constantly like, "Remember the time when we..." and we'll laugh and it's hilarious. So the whole thing wasn't horrible. It's not like I'm saying "don't start a band". I'm just saying, you've got to set your personal boundaries, as far as touring goes. As far as the grind. It's really important to take a break and we never got one."

=== Thieves EP ===
Less than two years after their breakup, the band released one last EP of unreleased material titled, Thieves, on October 14, 2008. In the same October 16 interview where she would finally reveal the reasons behind the band's breakup, Katie Sketch would give insight into the motivating factors which caused the band to reunite in the studio one last time.

"I had heard a rumor that my record label was going to release songs that we hadn't released, from some demo recording we had done earlier. I was not happy with that. At all. Threatening isn't the right word, but I heard they were thinking about releasing it. So I freaked out, and during that freak-out period I realized that I really like the songs. People have been writing us, fans, asking about the songs, so I thought we should record them while we still remember them. […] I can only speak for myself, but I found that [the recording process for the Thieves EP] was extremely emotionally draining. I made sure we did it under our own terms. I had a friend who engineered it and we did it at my mum's house in BC. She lives on this island, so it was really relaxed. And we did it in stages so the band was never there at the same time, so we couldn't fall back into the band dynamic because "the band" was never there. I gave my friend strict instructions, like, sit in the back seat and don't offer any opinion. We need it to be the easiest session ever, because people are really sensitive, and if one person says, "Fuck this, I'm leaving," then it won't work. So we did it like that. [Having to release the EP on the same record label] is fine. I've really separated myself from the situation. But that sort of thing, being bound by a contract, straight up, that's a major obstacle in my desire to do music any more."

== Post-breakup solo projects ==
Since the band's breakup in 2006, several of the members have gone on to pursue solo projects.

Debora Cohen released demo tracks under the name, "Lovers Love Haters", which she renamed "Dancer in the Dark", with additional single releases.

Shmoo Ritchie fronted Vancouver hardcore band, Keep Tidy. She created a project, "Die Cowboy Die", and released a five-track eponymous album, and a 7-track album, AllCaps (2011).

A video of Katie Sketch performing with a new band called "Mermaids" as early as October 31, 2007, has surfaced on the internet too. Sketch has publicly stated that she fully intends to release a solo effort, but that legal complications have thus far prevented the band from officially releasing any music. According to Sketch:

"I feel like, OK, so I'm going to write a solo record and pour every part of myself into it, and I won't have control over where it's released in the United States again? [With regard to the possibility of releasing solo material independently,] I'm arguably bound by contract. […] It's seriously debatable and is being debated and has been for the last two years. I like to think that I'm not, and they like to think that I am. And that stress alone, honestly, keeps me from sitting down and working on music. I have no control over my own career. […] I can play live, but when it comes to releasing a record, they've straight up said to me, if you release any music you will be sued. And that kind of pressure, after all the work that I've done, really isn't like anything I need in my life right now."

Katie Sketch is now performing with Gentleman Reg and has been seen in some shows at the Gladstone Hotel and the Beaver in Toronto, Ontario.

In 2008, along with former Organ member Jenny Smyth, Sketch opened a gay-friendly Toronto bar and hang-out, The Henhouse. As of November 2016, Katie is the bassist of a Toronto-based all-female band, Vag Halen.

After the disbandment of The Organ, bass player Ashley Webber continued to explore her musical talents through various collaborations and solo endeavours.

Webber lent her vocal skills to notable projects, including collaborations with Pink Mountaintops and Bonnie 'Prince' Billy.

As Ashley Shadow, Webber has released two solo albums on Felte Records. Her solo work has garnered attention for its unique blend of atmospheric soundscapes and introspective lyrics. In support of her solo albums, Webber has embarked on tours across Canada, United States and Europe, showcasing her captivating live performances to audiences worldwide.

== Discography ==
=== Albums ===
- Grab that Gun (2004)

=== Singles and EPs ===
- Full Sketch (CD, 2000):
  "Picky" — "Cooler Than Clean" — "Steven Smith" — "Soundtrack" — "Sketchersize" — "Ice Fishing"
- "The Organ" (7-inch, 2002):
  "It's Time to Go" — "We've Got to Meet"
- Sinking Hearts (CD, 2002):
  "We've Got to Meet" — "I Am Not Surprised" — "It's Time to Go" — "Sinking Hearts" — "There Is Nothing I Can Do" — "No One Has Ever Looked so Dead"
- "Memorize The City" (7-inch, 2005):
  "Memorize The City" — "There Is Nothing I Can Do"
- Memorize The City (CD, 2005):
  "Memorize The City" — "There Is Nothing I Can Do" — "Memorize The City [Remixed by Simon Bookish]"
- "Let the Bells Ring" (7-inch, 2005):
  "Let the Bells Ring" — "Memorize the City [Remixed by Dustin Hawthorne]"
- Brother (CD + 7-inch, 2006):
  "Brother" — "Love Love Love" (Gideon Coe BBC Radio 6 Music Session 14/11/05)
- Memorize the City (CD + 7-inch, 2006):
  "Memorize the City"— "No One Has Ever Looked So Dead" (Gideon Coe BBC Radio 6 Music Session 14/11/05)
- Thieves (CD, 2008):
  "Even In The Night" — "Oh What A Feeling" — "Let The Bells Ring" — "Fire In The Ocean" — "Can You Tell Me One Thing" — "Don't Be Angry"
