= Georgia Harmer =

Canadian singer-songwriter

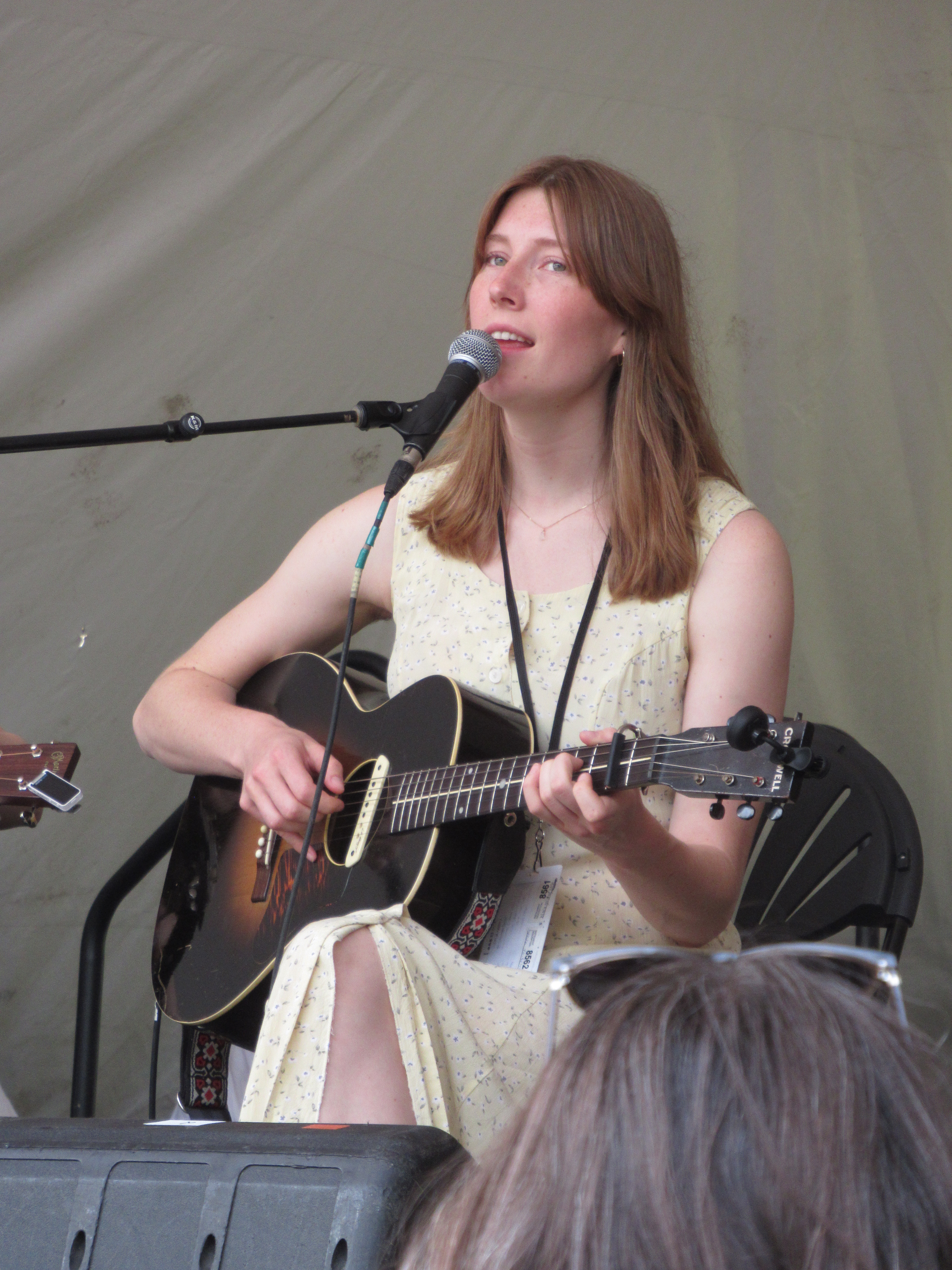
- Harmer performing at the 2023 Winnipeg Folk Festival

Georgia Harmer is a Canadian singer-songwriter, whose debut album Stay in Touch was released in 2022 on Arts & Crafts Productions.

She is the niece of Sarah Harmer and the daughter of Mary Harmer and Gord Tough; all of whom are former members of the band Weeping Tile. Tough is the guitarist for Sarah Harmer and Kathleen Edwards.

At the age of 9, Harmer was in the child band I Eat Kids, whose members also included Tim Vesely's daughter Sadie. She attended McGill University in the late 2010s before dropping out to pursue her own music career. She then took a gig as a backing vocalist for Alessia Cara.

Harmer released her debut single "Headrush" in 2021. In 2022, she followed up with the singles "Austin", "All in My Mind", "Talamanca", and "Top Down" in advance of releasing her album, Stay in Touch on April 22, 2022. She supported the album with a national tour as an opening act for Dan Mangan.

In 2023, Harmer joined with singer-songwriters Dylan MacDonald and Kris Ulrich and drummer Julian Psihogios to form the band Dweller, which released its self-titled debut EP in December of that year.

She helped singer-songwriter Bells Larsen compose vocal harmonies for his 2025 album Blurring Time.

Eye of the Storm, her second full-length album, was released on August 15, 2025. It was supported through the fall by her first full concert tour of Canada as a headliner.
