= 2018 in Canadian music =

The following musical events and releases that happened in 2018 in Canada.

== Events ==
- March – Juno Awards of 2018
- April – East Coast Music Awards
- May – Prism Prize
- June – Preliminary longlist for the 2018 Polaris Music Prize is announced
- July – SOCAN Songwriting Prize
- July – Shortlist for the Polaris Music Prize is announced
- September 17 – Jeremy Dutcher wins the Polaris Music Prize for his album Wolastoqiyik Lintuwakonawa
- December 1 – 14th Canadian Folk Music Awards

== Albums released ==
=== A ===
- AHI, In Our Time
- Alaskan Tapes, The Ocean No Longer Wants Us
- Alaskan Tapes, You Were Always an Island
- Jann Arden, These Are the Days – February 2
- Ardn, Goodwill
- Arkells, Rally Cry – October 19
- Astral Swans, Strange Prison – May 30

=== B ===
- Bahamas, Earthtones – January 19
- Gord Bamford, Neon Smoke – January 19
- Jill Barber, Metaphora – June 22
- Matthew Barber, Phase of the Moon
- Alexis Baro, Sandstorm
- Ridley Bent, Ridley Bent and the Killer Tumbleweeds
- Beppie, Let's Go Bananas!
- Bernice, Puff LP: in the air without a shape
- Laila Biali, Laila Biali – January 26
- Jean-Michel Blais, Dans ma main – May 11
- Forest Blakk, Minutes
- The Blue Stones, Black Holes (re-release) - October 26
- Bob Moses, Battle Lines – September 14
- Bonjay, Lush Life
- Born Ruffians, Uncle, Duke & the Chief – February 16
- Paul Brandt, The Journey YYC, Vol. 1 – April 6
- Paul Brandt, The Journey BNA, Vol. 2 – November 9
- Michael Jerome Browne, Can't Keep a Good Man Down
- Jim Bryson, Tired of Waiting – September 14
- Mariel Buckley, Driving in the Dark
- T. Buckley, Miles We Put Behind

=== C ===
- Cadence Weapon, Cadence Weapon – January 19
- Aleksi Campagne, Aleksi Campagne
- Alessia Cara, The Pains of Growing – November 30
- Caracol, À paraitre – February 2
- Jennifer Castle, Angels of Death – May 18
- Ramon Chicharron, Merecumbé
- Chilly Gonzales, Solo Piano III – September 7
- Chromeo, Head Over Heels – June 15
- City and Colour, Guide Me Back Home – October 5
- Classified, Tomorrow Could Be – June 29; Tomorrow Could Be The Day Things Change – October 12
- Cœur de pirate, En cas de tempête, ce jardin sera fermé – June 8
- Antoine Corriveau, Feu de forêt
- Cowboy Junkies, All That Reckoning
- Jim Cuddy, Constellation – January 26

=== D ===
- Marie Davidson, Working Class Woman
- Art d'Ecco, Trespasser
- Dilly Dally, Heaven
- The Dirty Nil, Master Volume – September 14
- Drake, Scary Hours – January 19
- Drake, Scorpion – June 29
- Jeremy Dutcher, Wolastoqiyik Lintuwakonawa – April 6

=== E ===
- Thompson Egbo-Egbo, A New Standard
- Elisapie, The Ballad of the Runaway Girl

=== F ===
- 54-40, Keep on Walking
- Christine Fellows, Roses on the Vine – November 16
- Michael Feuerstack, Natural Weather
- Dominique Fils-Aimé, Nameless
- Jeremy Fisher Junior, Highway to Spell
- Sue Foley, The Ice Queen – March 2
- La Force, La Force
- FouKi, Zay
- FouKi, La Zayté
- Angelique Francis, Kissed by the Blues
- The Fretless, Live from the Art Farm
- Debby Friday, Bitchpunk
- FRIGS, Basic Behaviour
- Frontperson, Frontrunner – September 21
- Fucked Up, Dose Your Dreams – October 5

=== G ===
- The Good Lovelies, Shapeshifters – February 9
- Grand Analog, Survival – January 26
- Gordon Grdina, China Cloud
- Great Lake Swimmers, Side Effects – April 13; The Waves, the Wake – August 17

=== H ===
- Harm & Ease, Black Market Gold
- Harrison, Apricity
- Hawk Nelson, Miracles – April 6
- Hillsburn, The Wilder Beyond – February 2
- Nate Husser, minus 23 (July); 6° (October)
- Andrew Hyatt, Cain

=== I ===
- Zaki Ibrahim, The Secret Life of Planets – January 31
- Brandon Isaak, Rise 'n Shine

=== J ===
- Jazz Cartier, Fleurever – July 27
- Just John x Dom Dias, Don (June); Don II (November)

=== K ===
- Kae Sun, Whoever Comes Knocking – March 2
- Greg Keelor, Last Winter – April 27
- Kellarissa, Ocean Electro
- Mia Kelly, Cardboard Box
- Khotin, Beautiful You
- Francois Klark, Love
- Korea Town Acid, Mahogani Forest
- Nicholas Krgovich, "Ouch"

=== L ===
- Mélissa Laveaux, Radyo Siwèl – February 2
- Salomé Leclerc, Les choses extérieures
- Hubert Lenoir, Darlène – February
- Brianna Lizotte, Scratch 'Em
- Loony, Part 1
- Les Louanges, La nuit est une panthère
- Lowell, Lone Wolf
- The Lynnes, Heartbreak Song for the Radio

=== M ===
- Magic!, Expectations – September 7
- Maïa, Plus que vive
- Dan Mangan, More or Less – November 2
- Matiu, Petikat
- Kalle Mattson, Youth
- Matt Mays, Twice Upon a Hell of a Time – October 19
- Efrim Manuel Menuck, Pissing Stars – February 2
- Shawn Mendes, Shawn Mendes – May 25
- Dylan Menzie, As the Clock Rewinds
- Metric, Art of Doubt – September 21
- Milk & Bone, Deception Bay – February 2
- Monowhales, Control Freak
- Mother Mother, Dance and Cry – November 2

=== N ===
- N Nao, À jamais pour toujours
- Nap Eyes, I'm Bad Now – March 9
- Safia Nolin, Dans le noir – October
- Northern Haze, Siqinnaarut
- Justin Nozuka, Low Tide – February 16
- Justin Nozuka, Run To Waters – May 18

=== O ===
- OBUXUM, H.E.R.
- Oktoécho, Saimaniq
- The Olympic Symphonium, Beauty in the Tension – February 9
- Steven Lee Olsen, Timing Is Everything – November 9
- The Oot n' Oots, Electric Jellyfish Boogaloo
- Ought, Room Inside the World – February 16
- Our Lady Peace, Somethingness – February 23

=== P ===
- Dorothea Paas, One for the Road
- Pharis and Jason Romero, Sweet Old Religion
- Scott-Pien Picard, Scott-Pien Picard
- Pilou, La Vraie nature
- Postdata, Let's Be Wilderness
- Preoccupations, New Material – March 23

=== Q ===
- Queer Songbook Orchestra, Anthems & Icons

=== R ===
- Billy Raffoul, 1975
- Rare Americans, Rare Americans
- Allan Rayman, Harry Hard-On
- Lee Reed, The Steal City EP
- The Reklaws, Feels Like That – August 31
- Reuben and the Dark, Arms of a Dream – May 4
- Jessie Reyez, Being Human in Public
- Daniel Romano, Human Touch – January 4
- Daniel Romano, Nerveless – January 4
- Daniel Romano, Finally Free
- Rum Ragged, The Hard Times
- Rusty, Dogs of Canada

=== S ===
- Jay Scøtt, EM0G0D
- Jay Scøtt x Smitty Bacalley, Un chevreuil
- Joseph Shabason, Anne – November 16
- Mike Shabb, Northwave
- Shad, A Short Story About a War – October 28
- Dylan Sinclair, Red Like Crimson
- The Slakadeliqs, Heavy Rockin' Steady – February 9
- Sloan, 12 – April 6
- Snotty Nose Rez Kids, Rez Bangers & Koolapops
- So Loki, Planet Bando
- So Loki and bbno$, Whatever
- Souldia, L'Album noir and Survivant
- Rae Spoon, bodiesofwater
- Story Untold, Waves – February 2
- Suuns, Felt – March 2

=== T ===
- TEKE::TEKE, Jikaku
- Three Days Grace, Outsider – March 9
- Thus Owls, The Mountain That We Live Upon
- Tokyo Police Club, TPC – October 5
- The Trews, Civilianaires – September 14
- Tri-Continental, Dust Dance

=== U ===
- U.S. Girls, In a Poem Unlimited – February 16

=== V ===
- Mathew V, The Fifth
- Diyet van Lieshout, Diyet and the Love Soldiers
- Various Artists, The Al Purdy Songbook
- Vile Creature, Cast of Static and Smoke
- Voivod, The Wake – September 21

=== W ===
- Wax Mannequin, Have a New Name
- The Weeknd, My Dear Melancholy, – March 30
- Wild Rivers, Eighty-Eight
- Royal Wood, Ever After the Farewell
- Donovan Woods, Both Ways – April 20

=== Y ===
- Yamantaka // Sonic Titan, Dirt
- Young Galaxy, Down Time – April 6
- Yukon Blonde, Critical Hit – June 22

== Deaths ==
- January 25 – Tommy Banks, 81, jazz musician and politician
- January 31 – Leah LaBelle, 31, singer and contestant on American Idol
- June 19 – Matthew Grimson, 50, singer-songwriter
- October 20 – Jon McMurray, 34, rapper and freeskier
- December 19 – Mike "Beard Guy" Taylor, 51, keyboardist for Walk off the Earth
