= Indigenous music of Canada =

Music genre

Indigenous music of Canada encompasses a wide variety of musical genres created by Aboriginal Canadians. Before European settlers came to what is now Canada, the region was occupied by many First Nations, including the West Coast Salish and Haida, the centrally located Iroquois, Blackfoot and Huron, the Dene to the North, and the Innu and Mi'kmaq in the East and the Cree in the North. Each of the indigenous communities had (and have) their own unique musical traditions. Chanting – singing is widely popular and most use a variety of musical instruments.

== History ==
Traditionally, Indigenous Canadians used the materials at hand to make their instruments for centuries before Europeans immigrated to Canada. First Nation bands made gourds and animal horns into rattles, many rattles were elaborately carved and beautifully painted. In woodland areas, they made horns of birchbark and drumsticks of carved antlers and wood. Drums were generally made of carved wood and animal hides. Drums and rattles are percussion instruments traditionally used by First Nations people. These musical instruments provide the background for songs, and songs are the background for dances. Many traditional First Nations people consider song and dance to be sacred. For many years after Europeans came to Canada, First Nations people were forbidden to practice their ceremonies. That is one reason why little information about First Nations music and musical instruments is available.

Traditionally Inuktitut did not have a word for what a European-influenced listener or ethnomusicologist's understanding of music, "and ethnographic investigation seems to suggest that the concept of music as such is also absent from their culture." The closest word, nipi, includes music, the sound of speech, and noise. (Nattiez 1990:56)

Today, a revival of pride in First Nations art and music is taking and beauty of traditional First Nations art, music and musical instruments. Drums are closely associated with First Nations people. Some people say, "Drumming is the heartbeat of Mother Earth." First Nations made a great variety of drums. Healers sometimes use miniature drums. There are also tambourine-shaped hand drums, warrior drums, water drums, and very large ceremonial drums. Their size and shape depends on the First Nation's particular culture and what the drummer wants to do with them. Many are beautifully decorated. In many First Nations cultures, the circle is important. It is the shape of the sun and moon, and of the path they trace across the sky. Many First Nations objects, such as tipis and wigwams, are circular in shape. Traditional villages were place. First Nations people are recovering the knowledge, history often arranged with the dwellings placed in a circle. To this day, many First Nations people hold meetings sitting in a circle. Meetings often begin with a prayer, with the people standing in a circle holding hands.

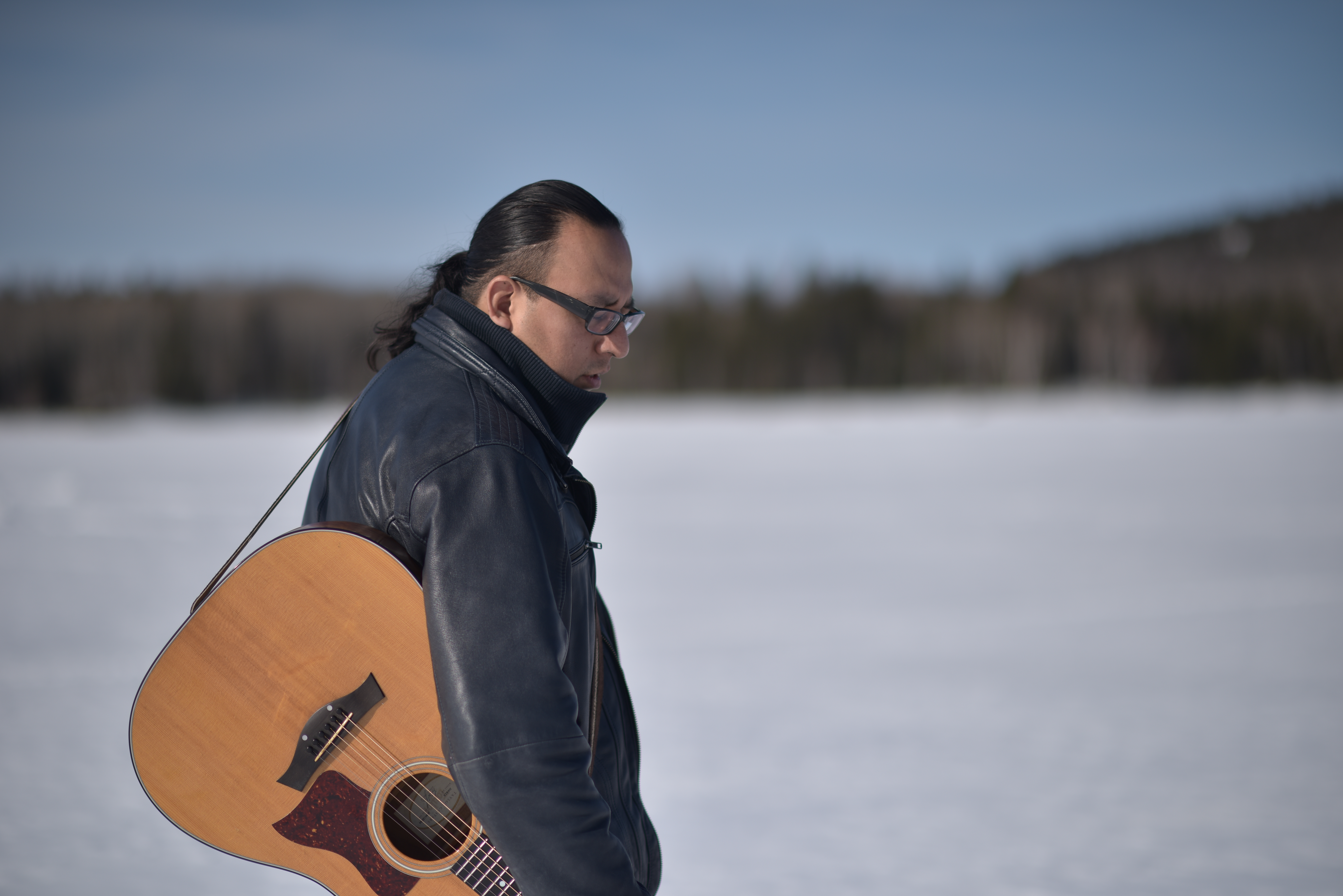
Atikamekw musician Sakay Ottawa

Hand carved wooden flutes and whistles are less common than drums, but are also a part of First Nations traditional music. Chippewa men played flutes to serenade girlfriends and to soothe themselves and others during hard times. The Cree, Iroquois and Maliseet made and used whistles. Archaeologists have found evidence that both wooden whistles and flutes were used by the Beothuk, an extinct tribe who lived in Newfoundland until the early days of European settlement. The human voice is the primary instrument of all First Nations. As it is in most ancient music, singing is the heart of First Nations traditions. Every song had an original owner. Songs belonged to a society, clan, rite, ceremony, or individual. In some cultures, one could buy the right to sing a song owned by an individual. The original owner would then teach the buyer to sing the song. Many traditional songs are still sung by First Nations people who follow traditional ways.

Many artists also now combine First Nations and Inuit music with mainstream popular music genres such as country, rock, hip-hop or electronic dance music. The Polaris Music Prize went to Tanya Tagaq for Animism in 2014 and to Jeremy Dutcher for Wolastoqiyik Lintuwakonawa in 2018 and for Motewolonuwok in 2024. (The 2017 Polaris went to Lido Pimienta for La Papessa; Pimienta is of South American indigenous descent. The 2015 Polaris went to Buffy Sainte-Marie for Power in the Blood before being revoked in 2025. Sainte-Marie claimed First Nations heritage, though investigative reporting in 2023 contested this claim.)

The compilation album Native North America, Vol. 1, released by Light in the Attic Records in 2014, collects many rare and out-of-print songs by First Nations and Inuit musicians from the era in which the rock and country and folk genres were beginning to emerge as influences on Indigenous music.

== Music areas ==
=== Northeast Woodlands ===
Inhabiting a wide swath of the United States and Canada, Eastern Woodlands natives, according to Nettl, can be distinguished by antiphony (call and response style singing), which does not occur in other areas. Their territory includes Maritime Canada, New England, U.S. Mid-Atlantic, Great Lakes and Southeast regions. Songs are rhythmically complex, characterized by frequent metric changes and a close relationship to ritual dance. Flutes and whistles are solo instruments, and a wide variety of drums, rattles and striking sticks are played. Nettl describes the Eastern music area as the region between the Mississippi river and the Atlantic. The most complex styles being that of the Southeastern Creek, Yuchi, Cherokee, Choctaw, Iroquois and their language group, the simpler style being that of the Algonquian language group including Delaware and Penobscot. The Algonquian speaking Shawnee have a relatively complex style influenced by the nearby southeastern tribes.

The characteristics of this entire area include short iterative phrases, reverting relationships, shouts before, during, and after singing, anhematonic pentatonic scales, simple rhythms and metre and, according to Nettl, antiphonal or responsorial techniques including "rudimentary imitative polyphony". Melodic movement tends to be gradually descending throughout the area and vocals include a moderate amount of tension and pulsation.

=== Plains ===
Extending across the American Midwest into Canadian Prairies, Plains-area music is nasal, with high pitches and frequent falsettos, with a terraced descent (a step-by-step descent down an octave) in an unblended monophony. Strophes use incomplete repetition, meaning that songs are divided into two parts, the second of which is always repeated before returning to the beginning.

Large double-sided skin drums are characteristic of the Plains tribes, and solo end-blown flutes (flageolet) are also common.

Nettl describes the central Plains tribes, from Canada to Texas: Blackfoot, Crow, Dakota, Cheyenne, Arapaho, Kiowa, and Comanche, as the most typical and simple sub-area of the Plains-Pueblo music area. This area's music is characterized by extreme vocal tension, pulsation, melodic preference for perfect fourths and a range averring a tenth, rhythmic complexity, and increased frequence of tetratonic scales. The musics of the Arapaho and Cheyenne intensify these characteristics, while the northern tribes, especially Blackfoot music, feature simpler material, smaller melodic ranges, and fewer scale tones.

Nettl Arapaho music includes ceremonial and secular songs, such as the ritualistic Sun Dance, performed in the summer when the various bands of the Arapaho people would come together. Arapaho traditional songs consist of two sections exhibiting terraced descent, with a range greater than an octave and scales between four and six tones. Other ceremonial songs were received in visions, or taught as part of the men's initiations into a society for his age group. Secular songs include a number of social dances, such as the triple metre round dances and songs to inspire warriors or recent exploits. There are also songs said to be taught by a guardian spirit, which should only be sung when the recipient is near death.

=== Northwest Coast ===
Open vocals with monophony are common in the Pacific Northwest and British Columbia, though polyphony also occurs (this the only area of North America with native polyphony). Chromatic intervals accompanying long melodies are also characteristic, and rhythms are complex and declamatory, deriving from speech. Instrumentation is more diverse than in the rest of North America, and includes a wide variety of whistles, flutes, horns and percussion instruments.

Nettl describes the music of the Kwakwaka'wakw, Nuu-chah-nulth, Tsimshian, Makah, and Quileute as some of the most complex on the continent, with the music of the Salish nations (Nlaka'pamux, Nuxálk, and Sliammon, and others directly east of the Northwest tribes) as being intermediary between these Northwest Coast tribes and Inuit music. The music of the Salish tribes, and even more so the Northwest coast, intensifies the significant features of Inuit music, their melodic movement is often pendulum-type ("leaping in broad intervals from one limit of the range to the other"). The Northwest coast music also "is among the most complicated on the continent, especially in regard to rhythmic structure," featuring intricate rhythmic patterns distinct from but related to the vocal melody and rigid percussion. He also reports unrecorded use of incipient polyphony in the form of drones or parallel intervals in addition to antiphonal and responorial forms. Vocals are extremely tense, producing dynamic contrast, ornamentation, and pulsation, and also often using multiple sudden accents in one held tone.

=== Arctic – Sub-Arctic ===
Nettl describes Inuit music as recitative-like singing, complex rhythmic organization, relatively small melodic range averaging about a sixth, prominence of major thirds and minor seconds melodically, with undulating melodic movement.

==== Inuit ====
The Inuit are well known for Inuit throat singing or katajjaq, an unusual method of vocalizing found only in a few cultures worldwide. Narrow-ranged melodies and declamatory effects are common, as in the Northwest. Repeated notes mark the ends of phrases.

Box drums, which are found elsewhere, are common, as a tambourine-like hand drum.

==== Cree ====
Much Cree song takes the form of repeated sections delineated by rests and melodic or rhythmic patterns, though not all repetitions are exact.

== Contributions of First Nations music to Canadian culture ==
=== Edward Gamblin ===
Edward Gamblin was a country rock singer-songwriter, who is widely credited as one of the most influential artists in the history and development of First Nations music as a genre, as one of the first artists ever to build a successful career by focusing primarily on First Nations audiences rather than pursuing crossover appeal.

=== Donald Harvey Francks ===
Donald Harvey Francks or Iron Buffalo born in Vancouver, British Columbia. He was a drummer, poet, native nations champion, motorcyclist, author and peace activist. He was interested in Tibet and supports Greenpeace. He appeared many times at George's Spaghetti House, a Toronto jazz club that was the equivalent of New York's Birdland. He was also known to sit in on drums at the Colonial Tavern and other Toronto afterhours clubs and jazz venues.

=== Robbie Robertson ===
Robbie Robertson was a Canadian singer-songwriter, and guitarist. He is best known for his membership in The Band. He was ranked 78th in Rolling Stone magazine's list of the 100 Greatest Guitarists of All Time. Robertson was born to a Jewish father and a Mohawk mother and took his stepfather's last name after his mother remarried. He had his earliest exposure to music at Six Nations of the Grand River First Nation, where he spent summers with his mother's family. He studied guitar when he was a youth and wrote songs and performed since he was a teenager. From 1987 onwards, Robertson released a series of four solo albums. His first was self titled followed by Storyville, Music for the Native Americans, and Contact from the Underworld of Redboy.

=== Jerry Alfred ===
First Nations singer and storyteller Jerry Alfred helps to preserve First Nations language and traditions. Jerry is the Northern Tutchone (too-SHOWnee) "Keeper of the Songs." He lives in Pelly Crossing, a village in central Yukon, 300 kilometres north of Whitehorse. He was born in the nearby community of Mayo. Jerry managed to keep his Tutchone language despite many years spent in a residential school. Like his father before him, Jerry was named a Song Keeper at birth. A Song Keeper collects songs and sings them at potlatches and other First Nations ceremonial occasions. A self-taught guitarist, Jerry combines modern guitar techniques and the traditional music of his people. His 1994 recording, "Etsi Shon" (EET-seeshown) or "Grandfather Song" helps to keep his language and the spirit of his people alive.

=== Don Ross ===
Don Ross, guitarist and composer, is the son of a Mi'kmaq mother and a Scottish immigrant father. He is a band member of the Mi'kmaq community at Millbrook, Nova Scotia. Don was born and raised in Montreal and speaks both French and English. He earned an honors degree in fine arts (music) at York University in Toronto. He is one of the most respected musicians in Canada and is known as one of the top guitarists in the world. In September 1996, Don won the prestigious U.S. National Finger style Championship for the second time and is the only guitarist to have done so. In 1988, Don was the first Canadian, and first Indigenous person, to win this prize.

Don is a master of "fingerstyle" technique, which is like the technique used for classical guitar. His music is strongly influenced by jazz, folk, rock, and classical music, creating a personal style. Don calls his style "heavy wood!"

=== Buffy Sainte-Marie ===
Buffy Sainte-Marie is an Italian American who was adopted as an adult into the Piapot First Nation. She received a PhD in Fine Arts from the University of Massachusetts Amherst. She is a songwriter, performer and artist who has written hit songs that were performed by other famous artists including Elvis Presley, Barbra Streisand, and Neil Diamond. Her song, "Up Where We Belong" won an Academy Award. Buffy has earned many other awards, including an Academy Award and the United States award for Lifetime Musical Achievement in the Arts. She has also received a medal of recognition from Queen Elizabeth II. France named her "Best International Artist of 1993." Buffy has drawn large crowds to her performances, with an audience of 100,000 in one Denmark concert. She regularly performs in the small First Nations communities. In 1993, she helped to create a special award category within the Juno Awards competition to recognize the best recordings of Canadian Indigenous musicians. Buffy received a Lifetime Achievement Award in Arts at the 1998 National Aboriginal Achievement Awards.

=== Kashtin ===
The duo quickly became popular regionally in Quebec, and in 1988 they were featured in a documentary on the Innu for a Quebec television station. They were soon brought to Montreal to record, and released their self-titled debut album in 1989. Although that album was recorded in their native Innu-aimun language, spoken by just 12,000 people in the world, the album quickly became a major hit in Quebec, and soon in English Canada as well, eventually being certified double platinum. The singles "E Uassiuian" and "Tshinanu" were popular hits for the band.

=== Leela Gilday ===
Leela Gilday is a singer and songwriter, born and raised in Yellowknife, Northwest Territories. She is one of the North's better known performing artists. Since her early start in music, Leela has been nominated at the Juno Awards for "Best Music of Aboriginal Canada (2003)" and has won three awards in 2002 from the Canadian Aboriginal Music Awards: Best Female Artist, Best Folk Album, Best Songwriter. She won the 2007 Juno for Aboriginal Recording of the Year for Sedzé, her second album.

=== Glen Meadmore ===
Glen Meadmore is an actor and performance artist currently residing in Los Angeles. He has been described as "...the world's greatest exponent of the genre known as gay Christian punk". He is sometimes referred to as "Cowpunk". working as a performance artist, appearing at the famed punk, avant garde, artist scenester hangout nightclub the Anti-Club where he became renowned for his outrageous performances. During this time, he met African American queer political performance artist Vaginal Davis and the two formed the band Pedro, Muriel and Esther, also known as PME, one of the earliest queer punk bands to emerge.

=== Derek Miller ===
Derek Miller, born in Six Nations on 29 October 1974, is an Indigenous Canadian singer-songwriter. He is a two-time winner of the Juno Award for Juno Award for Indigenous Music Album of the Year, for his albums Lovesick Blues and The Dirty Looks. Derek has been brought to the attention of veteran and well respected musicians, such as Daniel Lanois and Buffy Sainte-Marie.

== See also ==
- Aboriginal rock
- Indigenous hip-hop
- Blackfoot music
- Iroquois music
- Kwakwaka'wakw music
- Music of Canada
- List of Indigenous musicians in Canada
