= Maggie Paul =

Indigenous Passamaquoddy elder

- Born: Maine
- Citizenship: Canadian
- Occupations: Indigenous elder, song keeper, mentor, sweat lodge keeper
- Awards: Indspire 2014

Maggie Paul is an Indigenous Passamaquoddy elder, teacher and song carrier who has travelled around the world to share Maliseet and Passamaquoddy culture. Also a sweat lodge keeper, Maggie Paul is known for her singing, and both performs and records traditional songs. Born in Maine, she has raised six children and lived most of her adult life on the Maliseet St. Mary's First Nation in York County, New Brunswick.

== Recordings ==
Maggie Paul has created two CDs that capture the traditional songs of the Passamaquoddy and Maliseet people. She uses song as part of traditional Indigenous ceremonies, and as a way to mentor young people who are looking to find their voice. In 2018 when Jeremy Dutcher accepted the Polaris Prize for his album Wolastoqiyik Lintuwakonawa he thanked elder Maggie Paul, who was one of his guests at the awards ceremony, for encouraging him to study the songs of his community. Work on Dutcher's album began when Paul asked him to listen to the archived music and language of the Wolastoq nation from over a century ago.

== Awards ==
In 2014 Maggie Paul was awarded an Indspire Award in the category of culture, heritage and art. The Indspire Awards annually recognize Indigenous individuals who are leaders in their fields, having made extraordinary contributions to their communities and to Canada.
