= Passamaquoddy (disambiguation) =

The Passamaquoddy are an historic indigenous ethnic group of northeastern North America and a federally recognized tribe in the United States.

Passamaquoddy may also refer to:

- Passamaquoddy Bay, a bay in Maine and New Brunswick
- Malecite-Passamaquoddy language, the language of the Passamaquoddy
- "Passamaquoddy", a song in Pete's Dragon (1977 film) and a fictional town in the film
