= For Colored Girls: Music From and Inspired by the Original Motion Picture Soundtrack =

Soundtrack album by various artists
- Released: November 2, 2010
- Recorded: 2010 (All tracks except Nina Simone's performance); 1966 (Nina Simone's sampled performance on "Four Women")
- Length: 50:10
- Label: Atlantic

For Colored Girls: Music From and Inspired by the Original Motion Picture Soundtrack is a soundtrack album for the feature film For Colored Girls (2010), released on November 2, 2010.

== Critical reception ==
Andy Kellman with Allmusic gave the soundtrack a four star rating, commenting "Most of the artists -- an impressive mix of distinct personalities, much like the film's cast -- contribute strong material that benefits from the context; each selection sounds like it belongs on the soundtrack for this particular film". Nitsuh Abebe with New York Magazine called the release "solemn and portentous", saying "It's being asked to perform an absurd, impossible task — somehow embracing as much as possible of the entire modern experience of black American women — so it stretches in a few directions".

== Track listing ==
Information is based on the album's Liner Notes

Standard edition
No.	Title	Writer(s)	Performer	Length
1.	"Main Title (with Joshua Bell, Aaron Zigman & The Hollywood Studio Symphony Orchestra)"	Aaron Zigman	Loretta Devine, Kimberly Elise, Whoopi Goldberg, Janet Jackson, Thandie Newton, Phylicia Rashad, Anika Noni Rose, Tessa Thompson, Kerry Washington	3:49
2.	"Longer & Stronger"	Sharon Jones, Bosco Mann, Homer Steinweiss, Neal Sugarman, Thomas Brenneck	Sharon Jones & The Dap-Kings	3:44
3.	"All Day Long (Blue Skies)"	Irving Berlin, Estelle Swaray, Avriele "Avenue" Crandle	Estelle	3:45
4.	"What More Can They Do"	Laura Izibor	Laura Izibor	3:25
5.	"Sun"	Warryn Campbell, Juan Winans, Lisa Kimmey Winans	Lalah Hathaway	2:40
6.	"Ansomnia"	Zaki Ibrahim, Chin Injeti	Zaki Ibrahim	5:09
7.	"Settle"	Montell Jordan, Anthony "Shep" Crawford, Jimmy "Professa Funk" Russell, Antonio "Da Maestro" Santiago, Kevin Arline, Kenya Ivey, Tavia Ivey	Gladys Knight	3:32
8.	"La Donna In Viola"	Ntozake Shange, Aaron Zigman	Karen Slack, Andrea Jones-Sojola & The Hollywood Studio Symphony Orchestra	3:27
9.	"Sechita (A Senhora em Amarelo)"	Jay Weigel	Anika Noni Rose & Carondelet Percussion Ensemble	1:57
10.	"Stand Up"	Macy Gray, Melissa "Honey" Larochelle, Jeffrey "Zoux" Bluestein, Corey Simon, Kannon "Caviar" Cross	Macy Gray	3:15
11.	"Without a Fight"	Harmony Samuels (Music & Lyrics), Eric Bellinger (Lyrics), Erika Nuri (Lyrics)	Janelle Monáe, Harmony Samuels	3:36
12.	"Four Women"	Nina Simone	Nina Simone, Simone, Laura Izibor & Ledisi	3:55
13.	"I Know Who I Am"	Harvey Mason Jr. (Music), Joanna Cotten (Lyrics), Melissa Manchester (Lyrics), Greg Barnhill (Lyrics)	Leona Lewis	4:08
14.	"Main Title (Instrumental)"	Aaron Zigman	Joshua Bell, Aaron Zigman & The Hollywood Studio Symphony Orchestra	3:14

Sample Credits

- "All Day Long (Blue Skies)" contains lyrics from "Blue Skies" written by Irving Berlin.
- "Four Women" uses samples from the original recording of "Four Women" performed by Nina Simone, used courtesy of The Verve Music Group.

== Personnel ==
Credits are adapted from Allmusic and the album's Liner Notes

Performance

- Kevin Arline - Bass Guitar (7)
- Joshua Bell - Violin (1, 14)
- Warryn Campbell - Instruments played by (5, additional on 12)
- Caviar - Vocal Group Chant (10)
- Shep Crawford - Drum Machine, Keyboards (7)
- Keith Eaddy - Bass played by (10)
- Nathan East - Bass played by (13)
- Estelle - Vocals (3)
- Voncielle Faggett - Background Vocals (7)
- Macy Gray - Vocals (10)
- Eric Hall - Saxophone (3)
- Lalah Hathaway - Vocals (5)
- Hollywood Studio Symphony - Other Instruments (1, 8, 14)
- Laura Izibor - Vocals (4, 12), Piano (4)
- Andrea Jones-Sojola - Soprano Vocals (8)
- Daniel "Adaggio" Jordan - Strings (3)
- Brian Kierulf - Other Instruments played by (4)
- Gladys Knight - Lead Vocals (7)
- Lake View Terrace Voices of Praise - Choir (13)
- Honey Larochelle - Additional Vocals (10)
- Ledisi - Vocals (12)
- Leona Lewis - Lead Vocals (13)
- Harvey Mason Sr. - Drums (13)
- Alfreda McDaniels - Background Vocals (7)
- Janelle Monáe - Vocals (11)
- Professa Funk - Guitar (7)
- Kevin Randolph - Keyboards (13)
- Harmony Samuels - Instruments played by (11)
- Antonio "Da Maestro" Santiago - Keyboards (7)
- Simone - Vocals (12)
- Nina Simone - Vocals, Piano (12)
- Michael Skinkus - Hand Drums (9)
- Karen Slack - Soprano Vocals (8)
- Derrick Tabb - Bass played by, Snare & Additional Drums (9)
- Kenneth Young - Background Vocals (7)
- Aaron Zigman - Piano (1, 8, 14)
- Zoux - Keyboards, Guitar, Vocal Group Chant (10)

Production

- Dan Amsden - Assistant Engineer (10)
- Bruce Beauchner - Recording Engineer, Audio Mixing (5, 12)
- David Boyd - Assistant Engineer (13)
- King Britt - Producer (6)
- Warryn Campbell - Producer (5, 12)
- Anne Catalino - Recording Engineer (7)
- Caviar - Producer, Music programming (10)
- Jeff Chestek - Recording Engineer, Audio Mixing (6)
- Avriele "Avenue" Crandle - Producer, Recording Engineer (3)
- Shep Crawford - Producer (7)
- Michael Daley - Assistant Engineer (13)
- Christian Delano - Recording Engineer (10)
- Dusty - Recording Engineer (11)
- Damian Elliot - Audio Mixing (10)
- Chris Finney - Recording Engineer (9)
- Macy Gray - Producer (10)
- Dabling Harward - Additional Recording Engineer (13)
- Andrew Hey - Producer, Recording Engineer (13)
- Jerry Hey - Producer (1, 8, 14)
- Chin Injeti - Producer (6)
- Kenya Ivey - Vocal arrangement (7)
- Tavia Ivey - Vocal arrangement (7)
- Montell Jordan - Producer, Vocal arrangement (7)
- Ryan Kennedy - Additional Recording Engineer (3)
- Brian Kierulf - Producer, Music programming, Recording Engineer, Audio Mixing (4)
- Adam Klemens - Music conductor (13)
- Vit Kral - Recording Engineer (13)
- Honey Larochelle - Producer (10)
- Stan Malveaux - Recording Engineer (10)
- Gabriel "Bosco Mann" Roth - Producer, Recording Engineer, Audio Mixing (2)
- Harvey Mason Jr. - Producer, Audio Mixing (13)
- Kenny Mason - Choir Director (13)
- Peter Mokran - Audio Mixing (7)
- Gary "G Major" Noble - Audio Mixing (3)
- Ulrich Pallemanns - Recording Engineer (13)
- Professa Funk - Producer (7)
- Florian Ritcher - Assistant Engineer (13)
- Steve Salani - Recording Engineer (13)
- Harmony Samuels - Producer (11)
- Dennis Sands - Recording Engineer (8)
- Josh Schwartz - Producer, Recording Engineer, Audio Mixing (4)
- Jason Schweitzer - Recording Engineer (10)
- Michael Stern - Recording Engineer, Audio Mixing (1, 8)
- Christopher "Tito Just Music" Trujillo - Audio Mixing (11)
- Jay Weigel - Producer, Audio Mixing (9)
- Todd Whitelock - Recording Engineer (1)
- Aaron Zigman - Producer, Orchestra Conductor (1, 8, 14)
- Zoux - Producer, Recording Engineer (10)
