= Wide Open (Weaves album) =

Studio album by Weaves
- Released: October 6, 2017
- Length: 41:11
- Label: Kanine

Weaves chronology
Weaves (2016)	Wide Open (2017)

Professional ratings
Aggregate scores
Source	Rating
Metacritic	75/100
Review scores
Source	Rating
AllMusic	3.5/5 stars
DIY	4/5 stars
Drowned in Sound	7/10
Exclaim!	9/10

Wide Open is the second studio album by Canadian band Weaves. It was released on October 6, 2017 through Kanine Records. The album was a shortlisted finalist for the 2018 Polaris Music Prize.

== Accolades ==
Publication	Accolade	Rank	Ref.
Exclaim!	Top 20 Pop/Rock Albums of 2017	15	
Juno Awards	Alternative Album of the Year	Nominated	
Paste	Top 50 Albums of 2017	46	
Polaris Music Prize	2018 Polaris Short list	Nominated	

== Track listing ==
No.	Title	Length
1.	"#53"	4:00
2.	"Slicked"	4:10
3.	"Law and Panda"	2:45
4.	"Walkaway"	3:36
5.	"La La"	3:47
6.	"Wide Open"	5:08
7.	"Motherfucker"	0:59
8.	"Scream"	5:04
9.	"Gasoline"	4:04
10.	"Grass"	4:03
11.	"Puddle"	3:35
