= Weaves (EP) =

EP by Weaves
- Released: March 26, 2014
- Studios: Dobbstown North, Echo Valley (unknown location); Candle Recording (Toronto, Ontario)
- Genre: Indie pop
- Length: 18:46
- Label: Buzz
- Producers: Morgan Waters; David Newfeld

Weaves chronology
Weaves (2014)	Weaves (2016)

Singles from Weaves
- 1. "Hulahoop" Released: April 30, 2013; 2. "Motorcycle" Released: July 23, 2013; 3. "Take A Dip" Released: September 23, 2013; 4. "Buttercup" Released: February 18, 2014

Weaves is the debut extended play of Canadian indie pop group Weaves. Two-thirds of the record was produced by guitarist Morgan Waters with GarageBand, the other third produced by David Newfeld. Praised by music journalists for its varied style and Burke's vocal performance, Weaves combines elements of high-quality recording common in pop music with lo-fi noise music styles to create a "disgusting" yet "catchy" feel. Released for streaming on March 26, 2014 and in stores on April 1, 2014 by Buzz Records, the EP was promoted with four singles ("Hulahoop", "Motorcycle", "Take A Dip" and "Buttercup"), with music videos for the latter three, a two-month tour and a remix record. Weaves was ranked number eight on Popmatters' list of best indie rock albums of 2014.

== Production and composition ==
Jasmyn Burke and Morgan Waters, who first met each other in a bar, started Weaves in 2012 when the two made demo songs based on files of song ideas Burke recorded on her iPhone. In 2013, bassist Zach Bines and drummer Spencer Cole joined the project and started recording their self-titled debut EP immediately after. "Motorcycle", "Take A Dip", "Do You See Past" and "Hulahoop" were produced by Waters in his bedroom using GarageBand, while "Buttercup" and "Closer" was produced by David Newfeld in his church studio of Dobbstown North. Waters described Newfeld's production contributions as "music lessons and artist lessons in a way," given that he knew what he was making. He also said, "That open mindedness and visibility to capture what happens in the moment and allow mistakes and encourage them brings you out of your comfort zone."

The indie pop album combines elements of high-quality recording common in pop music with lo-fi noise music styles, leading to a complicated sound of "bombast and confusion" and a feel of the tracks being "disgusting" yet "catchy" as the band described. Now's Carla Gillis gave style descriptions such as "soul-grunge" and "sludge-pop" to label this sound. Elements from a big number of genres are present on Weaves, such as neo-pop, R&B, soul, art rock, and psychedelic music. The lyrics on the songs are filled with sexual innuendo such as "Won't you ride my motorcycle / Take a ride", which Gillis wrote "can turn into both amusing nah-nah-nah insolence and wailing, dead-serious desperation on a dime."

== Promotion ==
Four songs were released as singles before Weaves was issued: "Hulahoop" on April 30, 2013, "Motorcycle" on July 23, 2013, "Take A Dip" on September 23, 2013, and "Buttercup" on February 18, 2014. "Take a Tip" was a premiere by Spin magazine. The blog BrooklynVegan premiered Weaves for streaming on March 26, 2014. A tour in Ontario and New York promoting the EP last from April 10 to June 22, 2014. On July 21, 2014, Noisey premiered the remix EP for Weaves, which features a re-edit of "Hulahoop" by Bram Gielen. The video for the remix was released by Chart Attack on July 29, 2014, and in the video, Burke "drinks from straw glasses, waves torches and sparklers and performs some lounging, laconic dance moves."

On August 12, 2013, a music video for the song "Motorcycle" was released. Chart Attack noted the video's "weird, wrong-handed sketches, which divert from the Badlands 4 Kidz plot with lots of delightful non-sequiter cutaways to make it a junky feast for your rapidly deteriorating attention span." On March 24, 2014, Rookie magazine premiered the video for "Buttercup". The weird, crazy look of the video is meant to match the pretty-looking yet poisonous aspect of a buttercup, a flower the song is named after. Both videos were directed and created by Jason Harvey, who Waters described as "a really talented guy" with his own "strong voice". On October 15, 2013, the video for "Take a Dip" was released; it depicts Burke dressed in a white-colored shawl in a dark-lit church. The other band members appear near the end of the video, where she grates cheddar cheese onto their heads as they bow to her.

== Critical reception ==
Professional ratings
Review scores
Source	Rating
Exclaim!	8/10
Now	NNNN
Popmatters	4/10 stars

Response towards Weaves from music journalists upon release was generally favorable. Critics from publications like Exclaim! and Noisey praises included the record's combination of numerous musical styles to the point where the overall genre the EP could be labeled its own category or could be very hard to pin-point. Noisey said that the EP "experiments and dips across genre lines in a balancing act between of laxity and concentration, without all of the pretension and exclusivity that normally accompanies a buzzing indie band". A more mixed review came from Liz Fox of Popmatters, finding most of the aspects of Weaves typical of indie music released in the previous fifteen years but praising Burke's "sultry" vocal performance that "improve the elaborate backdrop, allowing for some simplicity among the chaos". Now called the EP an "excellent introduction for new fans", writing that its only downfall was the track "Do You See Past" due to its "more sophisticated, less interesting electro-pop sound". In a list by another Popmatters journalist of the best indie rock albums of 2014, Weaves ranked number eight.

== Track listing ==
All tracks are written by Jasmyn Burke and Morgan Waters

Weaves – Standard version
No.	Title	Producer	Length
1.	"Buttercup"	David Newfeld	3:37
2.	"Motorcycle"	Morgan Waters	2:52
3.	"Take a Dip"	Waters	3:04
4.	"Do You See Past"	Waters	3:14
5.	"Closer"	Newfeld	3:08
6.	"Hulahoop"	Waters	2:51
Total length:			18:46

Weaves – Remixed
No.	Title	Length
1.	"Hulahopp" (Bram Gielen remix)	4:24
2.	"Motorcycle" (Beta Frontiers remix)	3:50
3.	"Closer" (Babe Rainbow remix)	3:48
4.	"Do You See Past" (J FM remix)	4:20
5.	"Take A Dip" (David Newfeld remix)	4:51
Total length:		21:13

== Credits and personnel ==
Credits adapted from liner notes of Weaves.

Locations

- Produced, mixed and engineered at Dobbstown North (unknown location), also engineered at Candle Recording in Toronto, Ontario and Echo Valley (unknown location)

Credits

- Jasmyn Burke – Lead vocals
- Morgan Waters – Lead guitar, bass and production on "Motorcycle", "Take A Dip", "Do You See Past" and "Hulahoop", mixing on "Hulahoop",
- Bram Gielen – Organ on "Motorcycle" and "Take A Dip"
- Spencer Cole – Drums
- Zach Bines – Bass on "Buttercup" and "Closer"
- Nathan Vanderwielen – Engineering on "Motorcycle" and "Take a Dip"
- David Newfeld – Production, engineering, mixing and synthesizers on "Buttercup" and "Closer", mastering
- Leon Taheny – engineering on "Motorcycle", "Take a Dip" and "Do You See Past", mixing on "Motorcycle"
- Nick Stumpf – Mixing on "Motorcycle", "Take A Dip" and "Do You See Past"
- Alanna Questell – Artwork
- George Kokomo – Artwork photography

== Release history ==
Region	Date	Format(s)	Label
Worldwide	April 1, 2014	Digital download; CD	Buzz Records
