= Polaris Music Prize =

Annual Canadian Music Award

- Current: 2026 Polaris Music Prize
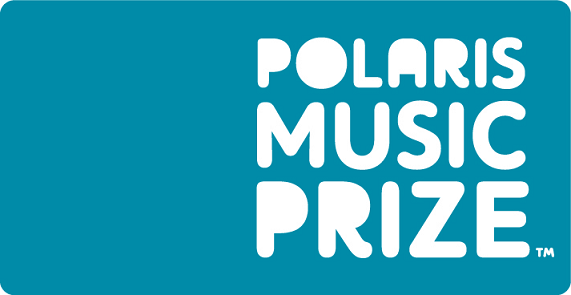
- Awarded for: Best full-length Canadian album based on artistic merit regardless of genre, sales, or record label
- Country: Canada
- First award: 2006
- Website: polarismusicprize.ca

The Polaris Music Prize is an annual music award given to the best full-length Canadian album based on artistic merit, regardless of genre, sales, or record label. The award was established in 2006 with a $20,000 cash prize, which was increased to $30,000 in 2011. The prize was increased to $50,000 in May 2015 by Slaight Music. Second-place prizes for the nine other acts on the shortlist also increased from $2,000 to $3,000. The prize amount was reduced again to $30,000 in 2025 as various sponsors reduced their contributions.

Polaris officials announced the Slaight Family Polaris Heritage Prize, an award that "will annually honour five albums from the five decades before Polaris launched in 2006."

The prize, modeled on the United Kingdom and Ireland's Mercury Prize, inspired the Atlantis and Borealis Music Prizes for Newfoundland and Labrador.

The Polaris committee and SOCAN announced the creation of the SOCAN Polaris Song Prize, honouring individual songs in addition to the albums award, in 2025. It replaced the SOCAN Songwriting Prize.

== Jury and selection ==
There is no submission process or entry fee for the prize, and jurors select what they consider the five best Canadian albums released in the previous year. Ballots are tabulated with each number-one pick awarded five points and a number-two pick awarded four points. A list of 40 titles is released in mid-June and sent back to the jury, which re-submits five top picks.

Ballots are re-tabulated and the top ten titles are the Polaris short list, which is released in early July. A group of 11 jurors (the "Grand Jury") meets in Toronto in late September to choose the winner. The nominated artists (or bands) perform, and the winner is announced by the previous year's winner. Each shortlisted album has one grand juror to advocate for it; ten jurors are selected for naming a shortlisted album as their top pick in the balloting, and the remaining juror did not vote for any shortlisted albums.

The Polaris Music Prize board of directors selects the jurors from a list of over 200 Canadian music journalists, bloggers, and broadcasters. No one with a direct financial relationship with an artist can be a jury member. Enlisting music journalists, broadcasters and bloggers as judges attracts attention to good music in a cluttered commercial landscape and a fractured music scene. Former CBC Q host and first Polaris Gala host Jian Ghomeshi was quietly removed from the juror pool on November 3, 2014.

In 2026, the prize announced that it was dropping the grand jury deliberation process, and opening the voting on the final winner to a full 205-member voting panel.

== Winners and shortlists ==
Year	Winner	Shortlisted nominees and albums	Ref.
2006	Final Fantasy – He Poos Clouds	Broken Social Scene – Broken Social Scene; Cadence Weapon – Breaking Kayfabe; The Deadly Snakes – Porcella; Sarah Harmer – I'm a Mountain; K'naan – The Dusty Foot Philosopher; Malajube – Trompe-l'oeil; Metric – Live It Out; The New Pornographers – Twin Cinema; Wolf Parade – Apologies to the Queen Mary	
2007	Patrick Watson – Close to Paradise	Arcade Fire – Neon Bible; The Besnard Lakes – The Besnard Lakes Are the Dark Horse; The Dears – Gang of Losers; Julie Doiron – Woke Myself Up; Feist – The Reminder; Junior Boys – So This Is Goodbye; Miracle Fortress – Five Roses; Joel Plaskett Emergency – Ashtray Rock; Chad VanGaalen – Skelliconnection	
2008	Caribou – Andorra	Black Mountain – In the Future; Basia Bulat – Oh, My Darling; Kathleen Edwards – Asking for Flowers; Holy Fuck – LP; Plants and Animals – Parc Avenue; Shad – The Old Prince; Stars – In Our Bedroom After the War; Two Hours Traffic – Little Jabs; The Weakerthans – Reunion Tour	
2009	Fucked Up – The Chemistry of Common Life	Elliott Brood – Mountain Meadows; Great Lake Swimmers – Lost Channels; Hey Rosetta! – Into Your Lungs; K'naan – Troubadour; Malajube – Labyrinthes; Metric – Fantasies; Joel Plaskett – Three; Chad VanGaalen – Soft Airplane; Patrick Watson – Wooden Arms	
2010	Karkwa – Les Chemins de verre	The Besnard Lakes – The Besnard Lakes Are the Roaring Night; Broken Social Scene – Forgiveness Rock Record; Caribou – Swim; Dan Mangan – Nice, Nice, Very Nice; Owen Pallett – Heartland; Radio Radio – Belmundo Regal; The Sadies – Darker Circles; Shad – TSOL; Tegan and Sara – Sainthood	
2011	Arcade Fire – The Suburbs	Austra – Feel It Break; Braids – Native Speaker; Destroyer – Kaputt; Galaxie – Tigre et diésel; Hey Rosetta! – Seeds; Ron Sexsmith – Long Player Late Bloomer; Colin Stetson – New History Warfare Vol. 2: Judges; Timber Timbre – Creep on Creepin' On; The Weeknd – House of Balloons	
2012	Feist – Metals	Cadence Weapon – Hope in Dirt City; Cold Specks – I Predict a Graceful Expulsion; Drake – Take Care; Kathleen Edwards – Voyageur; Fucked Up – David Comes to Life; Grimes – Visions; Handsome Furs – Sound Kapital; Japandroids – Celebration Rock; Yamantaka // Sonic Titan – YT//ST	
2013	Godspeed You! Black Emperor – 'Allelujah! Don't Bend! Ascend!	Zaki Ibrahim – Every Opposite; Metric – Synthetica; Metz – Metz; Purity Ring – Shrines; Colin Stetson – New History Warfare Vol. 3: To See More Light; Tegan and Sara – Heartthrob; A Tribe Called Red – Nation II Nation; Whitehorse – The Fate of the World Depends on This Kiss; Young Galaxy – Ultramarine	
2014	Tanya Tagaq – Animism	Arcade Fire – Reflektor; Basia Bulat – Tall Tall Shadow; Mac DeMarco – Salad Days; Drake – Nothing Was the Same; Jessy Lanza – Pull My Hair Back; Owen Pallett – In Conflict; Shad – Flying Colours; Timber Timbre – Hot Dreams; Yamantaka // Sonic Titan – UZU	
2015	Buffy Sainte-Marie – Power in the Blood (rescinded in 2025)	Alvvays – Alvvays; BadBadNotGood & Ghostface Killah – Sour Soul; Braids – Deep in the Iris; Caribou – Our Love; Jennifer Castle – Pink City; Drake – If You're Reading This It's Too Late; Tobias Jesso Jr. – Goon; The New Pornographers – Brill Bruisers; Viet Cong – Viet Cong	
2016	Kaytranada – 99.9%	Black Mountain, IV; Basia Bulat, Good Advice; Grimes, Art Angels; Carly Rae Jepsen, Emotion; Jessy Lanza, Oh No; PUP, The Dream Is Over; Andy Shauf, The Party; U.S. Girls, Half Free; White Lung, Paradise	
2017	Lido Pimienta – La Papessa	A Tribe Called Red, We Are the Halluci Nation; BADBADNOTGOOD, IV; Leonard Cohen, You Want It Darker; Gord Downie, Secret Path; Feist, Pleasure; Lisa LeBlanc, Why You Wanna Leave, Runaway Queen?; Tanya Tagaq, Retribution; Leif Vollebekk, Twin Solitude; Weaves, Weaves	
2018	Jeremy Dutcher – Wolastoqiyik Lintuwakonawa	Alvvays, Antisocialites; Jean-Michel Blais, Dans ma main; Daniel Caesar, Freudian; Pierre Kwenders, MAKANDA at the End of Space, the Beginning of Time; Hubert Lenoir, Darlène; Partner, In Search of Lost Time; Snotty Nose Rez Kids, The Average Savage; U.S. Girls, In a Poem Unlimited; Weaves, Wide Open	
2019	Haviah Mighty – 13th Floor	Marie Davidson, Working Class Woman; Elisapie, The Ballad of the Runaway Girl; FET.NAT, Le Mal; Dominique Fils-Aimé, Stay Tuned!; Les Louanges, La nuit est une panthère; PUP, Morbid Stuff; Jessie Reyez, Being Human in Public; Shad, A Short Story About a War; Snotty Nose Rez Kids, Trapline	
2020	Backxwash – God Has Nothing to Do with This Leave Him Out of It	Caribou, Suddenly; Jessie Reyez, Before Love Came to Kill Us; Junia-T, Studio Monk; Kaytranada, Bubba; Lido Pimienta, Miss Colombia; Nêhiyawak, nipiy; Pantayo, Pantayo; U.S. Girls, Heavy Light; Witch Prophet, DNA Activation	
2021	Cadence Weapon – Parallel World	DijahSB, Head Above the Waters; Dominique Fils-Aimé, Three Little Words; Klô Pelgag, Notre-Dame-des-Sept-Douleurs; Leanne Betasamosake Simpson, Theory of Ice; Mustafa, When Smoke Rises; The OBGMs, The Ends; The Weather Station, Ignorance; Tobi, Elements Vol. 1; Zoon, Bleached Wavves	
2022	Pierre Kwenders – José Louis and the Paradox of Love	Shortlist announced in July.: Destroyer, Labyrinthitis; Lisa Leblanc, Chiac Disco; Hubert Lenoir, PICTURA DE IPSE : Musique directe; Kelly McMichael, Waves; OMBIIGIZI, Sewn Back Together; Ouri, Frame of a Fauna; Shad, Tao; Snotty Nose Rez Kids, Life After; Charlotte Day Wilson, Alpha	
2023	Debby Friday – Good Luck	Alvvays, Blue Rev; Aysanabee, Watin; Begonia, Powder Blue; Daniel Caesar, Never Enough; Feist, Multitudes; Gayance, Mascarade; Dan Mangan, Being Somewhere; The Sadies, Colder Streams; Snotty Nose Rez Kids, I'm Good, HBU?	
2024	Jeremy Dutcher – Motewolonuwok	Bambii, Infinity Club; The Beaches, Blame My Ex; Charlotte Cardin, 99 Nights; DijahSB, The Flower That Knew; Elisapie, Inuktitut; Cindy Lee, Diamond Jubilee; NOBRO, Set Your Pussy Free; Allison Russell, The Returner; Tobi, Panic	
2025	Yves Jarvis – All Cylinders	Bibi Club, Feu de garde; Lou-Adriane Cassidy, Journal d'un Loup-Garou; Marie Davidson, City of Clowns; Saya Gray, Saya; Mustafa, Dunya; Nemahsis, Verbathim; The OBGMs, Sorry, It's Over; Population II, Maintenant Jamais; Ribbon Skirt, Bite Down	
2026	Angine de Poitrine, Vol. II	Aquakultre, 1783; Begonia, Fantasy Life; Bibi Club, Amaro; Charlotte Cornfield, Hurts Like Hell; Beverly Glenn-Copeland, Laughter in Summer; Rochelle Jordan, Through the Wall; Les Louanges, Alouette!; Peaches, No Lube So Rude; Tanya Tagaq, Saputjiji	

== Slaight Family Polaris Heritage Prize ==
The Polaris jury introduced the Polaris Heritage Prize (later known as the Slaight Family Polaris Heritage Prize), an annual award program to honour classic Canadian albums released before the creation of the Polaris Prize, in 2015.

Heritage Prizes, selected by public vote from a shortlist of five nominees by a Heritage Prize jury, were awarded in their first year in the 1960s–1970s, 1980s, 1990s and 2000–2005 categories. In the second year, the shortlists were increased to 10, the categories shifted to 1960–75, 1976–85, 1986–1995 and 1996–2005, and a second prize was awarded by a jury with the winner of the public vote. The jury award ensures that albums which were artistically important but not necessarily commercially popular have a fair chance of winning; the jury does not meet to make its choice until after the popular-vote winner has been determined, in order to ensure that the two awards go to two different albums.

As of 2019, the Heritage Prize has been narrowed to a single shortlist rather than multiple separate by-decade categories. Prior to 2025, the nominees were announced at the Polaris ceremony, with the voting period then opening until the winners were announced about a month later; as of 2025, the nominees are now announced in the summer during the lead-up to the ceremony, with the winners announced at the same ceremony as the main album and song prizes.

Winners
Year	Winner	Category
2015	Joni Mitchell – Blue	1960-70s
2015	Cowboy Junkies – The Trinity Session	1980s
2015	Sloan – Twice Removed	1990s
2015	Peaches – The Teaches of Peaches	2000–2005
2016	Neil Young – After the Gold Rush	1960–1975 (public vote)
2016	Leonard Cohen – Songs of Leonard Cohen	1960–1975 (jury vote)
2016	Rush – Moving Pictures	1976–1985 (public vote)
2016	Kate & Anna McGarrigle – Kate & Anna McGarrigle	1976–1985 (jury vote)
2016	Blue Rodeo – Five Days in July	1986–1995 (public vote)
2016	Mary Margaret O'Hara – Miss America	1986–1995 (jury vote)
2016	Arcade Fire – Funeral	1996–2005 (public vote)
2016	Lhasa de Sela – La Llorona	1996–2005 (jury vote)
2017	Gordon Lightfoot – Lightfoot!	1960–1975 (public vote)
2017	The Band – The Band	1960–1975 (jury vote)
2017	Harmonium – L'Heptade	1976–1985 (public vote)
2017	Glenn Gould – The Goldberg Variations	1976–1985 (jury vote)
2017	The Tragically Hip – Fully Completely	1986–1995 (public vote)
2017	Eric's Trip – Love Tara	1986–1995 (jury vote)
2017	Feist – Let It Die	1996–2005 (public vote)
2017	k-os – Joyful Rebellion	1996–2005 (jury vote)
2018	Neil Young – Everybody Knows This Is Nowhere	1960–1975 (public vote)
2018	Jean-Pierre Ferland – Jaune	1960–1975 (jury vote)
2018	Rush – 2112	1976–1985 (public vote)
2018	Bruce Cockburn – Stealing Fire	1976–1985 (jury vote)
2018	Alanis Morissette – Jagged Little Pill	1986–1995 (public vote)
2018	Dream Warriors – And Now the Legacy Begins	1986–1995 (jury vote)
2018	Broken Social Scene – You Forgot It In People	1996–2005 (public vote)
2018	Kid Koala – Carpal Tunnel Syndrome	1996–2005 (jury vote)
2019	D.O.A. – Hardcore 81	Public vote
2019	Oscar Peterson Trio – Night Train	Jury vote
2020	Beverly Glenn-Copeland – Keyboard Fantasies	Public vote
2020	Main Source – Breaking Atoms	Jury vote (tie)
2020	Buffy Sainte-Marie – It's My Way! (rescinded in 2025)	Jury vote (tie)
2021	Nomeansno – Wrong	Public vote
2021	Faith Nolan – Africville	Jury vote
2022	SNFU – ...And No One Else Wanted to Play	Public vote
2022	Four the Moment – We're Still Standing	Jury vote
2023	Skinny Puppy – Bites	Public vote
2023	Maestro Fresh Wes – Symphony in Effect	Jury vote
2024	Tegan and Sara – So Jealous	Public vote
2024	Jackie Mittoo – Macka Fat	Jury vote
2025	The Organ – Grab That Gun	Public vote
2025	Jane Siberry – The Speckless Sky	Jury vote

== SOCAN Polaris Song Prize ==
The SOCAN Polaris Song Prize was announced and presented for the first time in 2025, replacing the dormant SOCAN Songwriting Prize. Unlike the main album prize, which starts with a longlist of 40 albums before being winnowed to a shortlist of ten, the song prize starts with a longlist of 20 songs before being reduced to a shortlist of five.

Nominees for the song prize are drawn primarily from the album nominees, but may also include songs not from a nominated album. Artists may also have more than one song nominated in the same year, although to date no artist has exceeded two.

Year	Winner	Shortlisted nominees and albums	Ref.
2025	Mustafa, "Gaza Is Calling"	Lou-Adriane Cassidy, "Dis-moi dis-moi dis-moi"; Saya Gray, "Shell (Of a Man)"; Yves Jarvis, "Gold Filigree"; Ribbon Skirt, "Wrong Planet"	
2026	Angine de Poitrine, "Fabienk"	Charlotte Cornfield, "Hurts Like Hell"; PUP, "Hunger for Death"; Patrick Watson and Martha Wainwright, "House on Fire"; Charlotte Day Wilson feat. Saya Gray, "Lean"	

== Ceremonies ==
The 2018 Polaris sponsors included the CBC, the Government of Canada, FACTOR, Ontario Media Development Corporation, Slaight Communications, Radio Starmaker Fund, SiriusXM, Stingray Music/Galaxie, The Carlu, Shure Canada, Toronto radio station Indie88, SOCAN, and Re-Sound20. Past sponsors have included Rogers Communications and Scion. The ceremonies are video-streamed live on CBC Music.

== Controversies ==
The prize has been considered too "indie" or too "mainstream". Polaris Salons, with jurors as panellists, are held in a number of cities before the ceremonies.

When Fucked Up won in 2009, mainstream media outlets were uncertain about how they would present the band's name. The Canoe.ca news service used the headline "F***** Up (language alert, language alert below) wins the 2009 Polaris Music Prize on Monday night"; The Globe and Mail headline was "Toronto hardcore band wins Polaris Music Prize," and The New Yorker's was "The Prize That Dare Not Speak Its Name".

Godspeed You! Black Emperor refused to attend the 2013 Polaris ceremonies. When the band won for their album, Allelujah! Don't Bend! Ascend!, representatives of their label (Constellation Records) accepted the prize on their behalf. Constellation's Don Wilkie said, "Godspeed will use the prize money to purchase musical instruments for, and support organizations providing music lessons to, people incarcerated within the Quebec prison system." The next day, the band said that "holding a gala during a time of austerity and normalized decline is a weird thing to do" and "maybe the next celebration should happen in a cruddier hall, without the corporate banners and culture overlords."

Tanya Tagaq said "Fuck PETA" in her 2014 victory speech, using her performance and subsequent interviews as a platform to draw attention to missing and murdered Aboriginal women across Canada. Lido Pimienta's 2017 acceptance speech ended with an obscenity-spiked outburst. "All of my fucking monitors were off," Pimienta shouted into the microphone at the end of the show, which was webcast by the CBC. She had performed two songs live: "I could not hear myself when I was up here. I'm fucking pissed off. Thank you though, motherfucker."

After the 2023 revelation of questions about the Indigenous Canadian status of singer-songwriter Buffy Sainte-Marie, calls were made to revoke her main- and heritage-prize awards. The committee rescinded the awards in 2025 after the revocation of her membership in the Order of Canada because she could no longer provide satisfactory proof of Canadian citizenship. Polaris organizers said they had no plans to pursue a return of her cash prize.

== Music releases ==
In 2006 and 2007, compilation CDs and souvenir program guides with one song from each shortlisted artist (except Arcade Fire in 2007) were given out at the Polaris ceremony. From 2008 to 2011, the program guides instead download cards for the songs.

Polaris has sponsored a series of promotional singles by nominees or winners. The "Polaris Cover Sessions" series has past nominees recording a cover of a song by another nominee or Heritage Prize winner, and the "Polaris Collaboration Sessions" series has two past nominees collaborating on new songs.

- 2015: Polaris Cover Sessions No. 1 (10-inch)
  - Sarah Harmer, "Odessa" (Caribou)
  - Whitehorse, "The Bones of an Idol" (The New Pornographers)
  - Great Lake Swimmers, "I'm a Mountain" (Sarah Harmer)
- 2016: Polaris Cover Sessions No. 2 (10-inch)
  - Arkells, "I Am Not Afraid" (Owen Pallett)
  - Zaki Ibrahim, "Show Me the Place" (Leonard Cohen)
  - Joel Plaskett, "Bittersweet Melodies" (Feist)
- 2017: Polaris Cover Sessions No. 3 (10-inch)
  - Little Scream, "Anew Day" (Mary Margaret O'Hara)
  - Hannah Georgas, "Crown of Love" (Arcade Fire)
  - Les soeurs Boulay, "Complainte pour Ste-Catherine" (Kate & Anna McGarrigle)
- 2018: Polaris Cover Sessions No. 4 (10-inch)
  - Jean-Michel Blais, "Mushaboom" (Feist)
  - Weaves, "Neighborhood #3 (Power Out)" (Arcade Fire)
  - Lindi Ortega, "Suzanne" (Leonard Cohen)
- 2019: Polaris Cover Sessions No. 5 (12-inch)
  - Faith Healer, "When You Awake" (The Band)
  - Partner, "Limelight" (Rush)
  - Pierre Kwenders, "It Ain't Fair" (Jean-Pierre Ferland)

=== Collaboration sessions ===
Polaris, the Banff Centre and Scion Sessions teamed up for a collaborative residency project with past shortlisted artists Shad and Holy Fuck. The result was the Scion Sessions-sponsored Holy Shad "Legend of Cy Borg Parts I and II" seven-inch single and a documentary video produced by AUX TV.

In 2017, Buffy Sainte-Marie and Tanya Tagaq collaborated on "You Got to Run (Spirit of the Wind)". Two years later, the Weather Station and Jennifer Castle recorded a two-song split single. The Weather Station's song was "I Tried To Wear The World (featuring Jennifer Castle)", and Castle's was "Midas Touch (featuring The Weather Station)."

== See also ==
- Canadian rock
- Choice Music Prize (Ireland)
- Mercury Music Prize (United Kingdom and Ireland)
- Australian Music Prize (Australia)
- Taite Music Prize (New Zealand)
- Prix Constantin (France)
- Shortlist Prize (United States)
- Nordic Music Prize (Nordic countries)
