= Bernice (band) =

Canadian indie pop band

- Origin: Toronto, Ontario, Canada
- Genres: Indie pop
- Labels: Telephone Explosion
- Members: Robin Dann; Thom Gill; Dan Fortin; Felicity Williams; Phil Melanson

Bernice is a Canadian indie pop band from Toronto, Ontario, fronted by singer and songwriter Robin Dann. The band's other core members are keyboardist and guitarist Thom Gill, bassist Dan Fortin, vocalist Felicity Williams and percussionist Phil Melanson.

Bernice has twice been longlisted nominees for the Polaris Music Prize, receiving nods at the 2018 Polaris Music Prize for Puff LP: In the air without a shape and at the 2021 Polaris Music Prize for Eau de Bonjourno.

== History ==
The band released its first album, What Was That, in 2011, and followed up with the five-song Puff EP in 2017. The Puff LP followed in May 2018, and Eau de Bonjourno was released in March 2021.
