= Buzz Records =

- Founded: 2011
- Founder: Denholm Whale, Ian Chai, Dean Tzenos and Jude
- Country of origin: Canada Canada
- Location: Toronto, Ontario
- Official website: buzzrecords.ca

Buzz Records is a Canadian-based independent record label with headquarters in Toronto, Ontario. The label evolved out of the underground performance space, The Garage. In 2011, the first releases from the Buzz Records collective were live recordings from the venue; a series titled "Live@The Garage". The Garage was closed down in 2012 but the label continued to release local, underground records in the cassette format.

Buzz Records is a collective, co-founded by Denholm Whale, Ian Chai, Dean Tzenos and Erik Jude.

The documentary Untold Noise, which focused on the Toronto noise punk scene, features interviews with Buzz Records co-founder Denholm Whale and Buzz Record signees, HSY.

The label has had showcases at Toronto's North by North East (NXNE) and New York City's CMJ. Canadian brewery Steam Whistle has collaborated with the record label for their Unsigned Music Series.

In 2017 the label received two Juno Award nominations, one for Dilly Dally's "Sore" and one for Weaves' self-titled debut album.
