= Maliseet-Passamaquoddy language =

Algonquian language

Maliseet-Passamaquoddy
- Malecite-Passamaquoddy
- Peskotomuhkati-Wolastoqey, skicinuwatuwewakon
- Pronunciation: [ˌbeskədəmuːˈkaː˧˦di wəˌlastəɡʷeɪ˨(˦)]
- Native to: Canada; United States
- Region: New Brunswick; Maine
- Ethnicity: 5,500 Wolastoqiyik and Passamaquoddy (2010)
- Native speakers: 310 (2021, Canada); 100 (2007, United States)
- Language family: Algic: Algonquian; Eastern Algonquian; Maliseet-Passamaquoddy
- Dialects: Wolastoqey; Passamaquoddy
- Writing system: Latin

Language codes
- ISO 639-3: pqm
- Glottolog: male1292
- ELP: Maliseet-Passamaquoddy
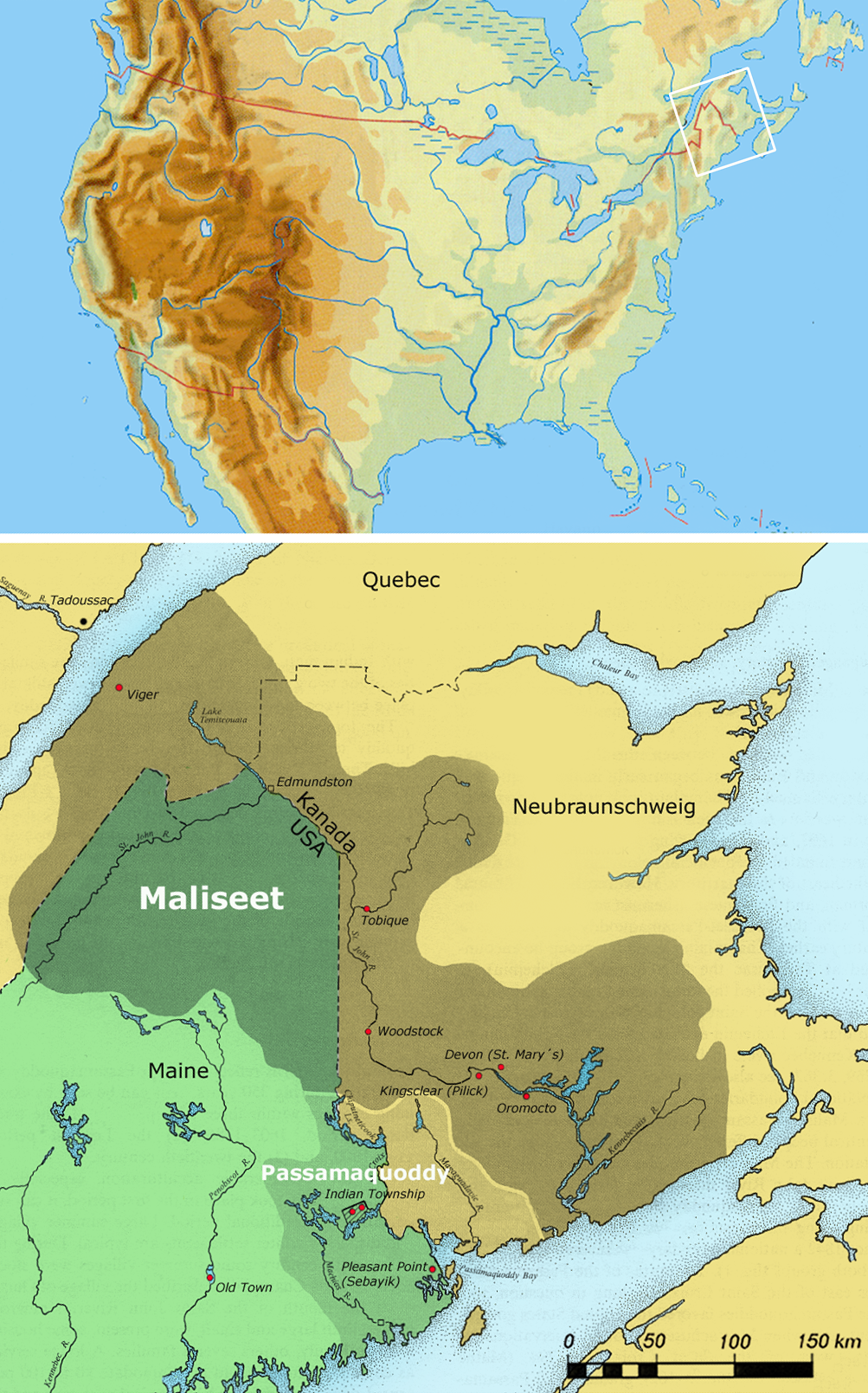
- Distribution of Wolastoqey and Passamaquoddy peoples

- Maliseet-Passamaquoddy is classified as Severely Endangered by the UNESCO Atlas of the World's Languages in Danger.

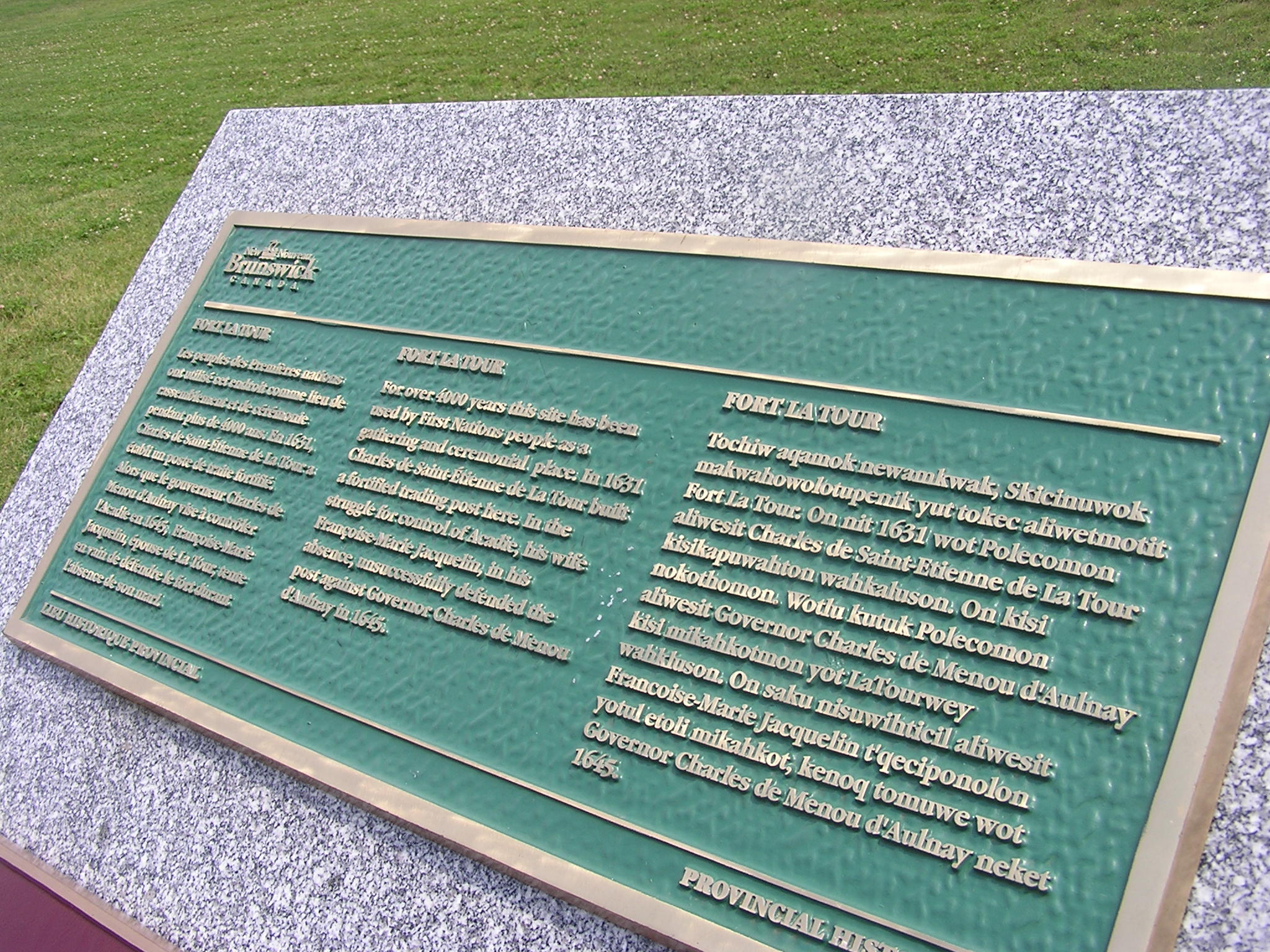
Plaque in French, English, and Maliseet at Fort La Tour

Maliseet-Passamaquoddy (/ˈmælɪsiːt ˌpæsəməˈkwɒdiː/ MAL-ih-seet PAS-ə-mə-KWOD-ee; skicinuwatuwewakon or skicinuwi-latuwewakon) or Peskotomuhkati-Wolastoqey (Note: Malecite-Passamaquoddy pronunciation: [ˌbeskədəmuːˈkaː˧˦di wəˌlastəɡʷeɪ˨(˦)]) is an endangered Algonquian language spoken by the Wolastoqey and Passamaquoddy peoples along both sides of the border between Maine in the United States and New Brunswick, Canada. The language consists of two major dialects: Maliseet, which is mainly spoken in the Saint John River Valley in New Brunswick; and Passamaquoddy, spoken mostly in the St. Croix River Valley of eastern Maine. However, the two dialects differ only slightly, mainly in their phonology. The Wolastoqiyik and Passamaquoddy widely spoke Maliseet-Passamaquoddy in these areas until around the post–World War II era when changes in the education system and increased marriage outside of the speech community caused a large decrease in the number of children who learned or regularly used the language. As a result, in both Canada and the U.S. today, there are only 600 speakers of both dialects, and most speakers are older adults. Although the majority of younger people cannot speak the language (particularly the Passamaquoddy dialect), there is growing interest in teaching the language in community classes and in some schools.

== Status and revitalization ==
Maliseet-Passamaquoddy has a ranking of 7 on the Expanded Graded Intergenerational Disruption Scale (EGIDS); a 7 corresponds to "Shifting: The child-bearing generation can use the language among themselves, but it is not being transmitted to children." However, in spite of this bleak assessment, there are significant efforts to revitalize the language and teach both children and adults who did not learn the language natively.

Since 2006, a project known as Language Keepers, which attempts to document endangered languages and increase public group discourse in these languages, has worked with the Passamaquoddy and Wolastoqey communities and done extensive documentation of the language. In their first three years of work, they filmed over 50 hours of natural group conversation with 70 speakers, which led to eight DVDs in Maliseet-Passamaquoddy subtitled in English. According to the Peskotomuhkati-Wolastoqey Language Portal, this film "stimulated language revival programs for people who understand but cannot speak, and identified new sources of resiliency and leadership in the language-speaking community." Their approach to documentation has garnered praise, with Meg Holladay from Cultural Survival stating "In contrast to 'elicitation,' in which linguists ask speakers questions to learn about a language, Language Keepers videos show how the language works in practice, and have provided many "new" words for the dictionary. They also document traditional Passamaquoddy culture activities, like canoe-building, and views of the world."

In addition to the film, the Language Keepers project—along with other linguists and community activists—has helped compile the Passamaquoddy-Maliseet Dictionary. This dictionary, started in the 1970s by linguist Philip S. LeSourd, includes over 18,000 entries, many of which include audio and video files of native speaker pronunciations.

Along with the various resources available online, revitalization efforts have included Maliseet-Passamaquoddy class teachings at the University of New Brunswick to increase inter-generational communication and transmission of knowledge and culture.

Jeremy Dutcher, a Canadian classical singer from the Tobique First Nation in New Brunswick, has recorded two albums of music sung partially or entirely in Wolastoqey (Wolastoqiyik Lintuwakonawa (2018) and Motewolonuwok (2023)).

== Phonology and orthography ==
The Maliseet-Passamaquoddy standard orthography consists of 17 letters and an apostrophe. The following tables are based on the sound system described by Robert M. Leavitt in Passamaquoddy-Maliseet (1996). The bold letters are the spelling in the standard orthography, and the symbols between the slashes give the respective IPA pronunciation:

=== Consonants ===
	Bilabial	Alveolar	Palatal	Velar	Labio -velar	Glottal
Nasal	m /m/	n /n/				
Plosive	p /p/	t /t/	c /tʃ/	k /k/	q /kʷ/	
Fricative		s /s/				h /h/
Approximant		l /l/	y /j/		w /w/	

Additionally, the standard orthography uses an apostrophe (') to represent word-initial consonants that are no longer pronounced due to historical sound changes. It only occurs word-initially before p, t, k, q, s, or c. These "missing consonants" can appear in other forms of the word. For example, the stem ktomakéyu produces the word 'tomakéyu 's/he is poor' (where the apostrophe indicates that the initial k has been dropped) as well as the word nkótomakey 'I am poor' (where the k remains pronounced because it occurs after the pronoun n-).

=== Vowels ===
There are six monophthongs, five of which are spelled with a single letter and one which is spelled with the combination eh. There are also five diphthongs, which are spelled as a combination of a vowel and a glide.

Monophthongs
	Front	Central	Back
High	i /i/		u /u/
Mid	e /e/	o /ə/	
Low	eh [æ]	a /a/	

When o appears before w, it is written as u to reflect the rounding of the vowel due to the influence of the w. /e/ may also be pronounced as [ɛ]. The sound represented by eh [æ] is an allophone of /e/ before an underlying /h/.

Diphthongs
Spelling	Pronunciation
aw	[au]
ew	[eu]
iw	[iu]
ay	[aɪ]
ey	[eɪ]

=== Phonological processes ===
Many phonological processes that occur in Maliseet-Passamaquoddy, the most important of which are outlined below:

- Several consonants have two allophones, which alternate depending on where they appear in the word. When they appear adjacent to another consonant or following an apostrophe, they use the default voiceless pronunciation given in the consonant chart above. When they appear only adjacent to vowels or the prefix n-, they use the voiced equivalent of the same sound. For example, in the word peciye [bed͡ʒije] 'he/she arrives', c is voiced. But in the word pihce [bit͡ʃe] 'far away', the c is unvoiced because it is adjacent to h. The voiced and unvoiced allophones of these consonants are as follows:

Consonant (orthography)	Voiceless allophone	Voiced allophone
p	[p]	[b]
t	[t]	[d]
k	[k]	[ɡ]
q	[kʷ]	[ɡʷ]
s	[s]	[z]
c	[t͡ʃ]	[d͡ʒ]

- Syncope of unstressed o is very common. This often occurs when o is in the first syllable of a verb stem used without a prefix. For example, in the word ktomakeyu 'if s/he is poor' (from the verb stem -kotomakey-), the first o drops out because it is unstressed. But in nkotomakey 'I am poor', which is built off the same verb stem, the first syllable is stressed. Therefore, the first o is not dropped. There are other environments where this occurs, but the syncope changes are usually predictable. LeSourd describes many of the syncope rules in Accent and Syllable Structure in Passamaquoddy (1993).
- Verbs with o (or an underlying o that has undergone syncope) in the first syllable of their stem have an ablaut form in the Changed Conjunct mode, where the o changes to an e. For example, the verb stem -wotom- ('smoke') becomes wetomat ('when he/she smoked').
- With verb stems that end in h, the vowel preceding the h changes to match the first vowel in the inflectional ending that follows the stem. The vowel preceding the h is therefore left as a blank underscore when writing out the stem. In the following example, the verb stem is -nehp_h- 'kill':
  - nehpah·a 'I kill him/her'
  - nehpeh·eq 'when you killed him/her'
  - knehpih·i 'you kill me'
  - nehpoh·oq 'he/she kills me'
  - nehpuh·uku·k 'they kill me'
- The monophthongs (except "o") are lengthened when they occur in certain positions, although vowel length is not contrastive. One notable difference between the two dialects is that vowels are generally not as long in Passamaquoddy as in Maliseet, but the distribution of long and short vowels are similar. LeSourd describes the following generalizations about vowel lengthening:
  - vowels are lengthened before a hC cluster but remain short before other consonant clusters
  - vowels are lengthened in open penultimate syllables if that syllable is stressed or if the final syllable is stressed
  - word final vowels are sometimes lengthened, especially when they occur before a pause

=== Distributional restrictions and syllable structure ===
Every phoneme except "o" and "h" can occur initially, medially, or finally; "o" and "h" are never word final. Clusters of two obstruents, geminate consonant pairs, and clusters of a sonorant followed by an obstruent are all common. Consonant clusters ending in a sonorant usually do not occur except in geminate pairs or when they occur initially with one of the personal pronoun prefixes. Clusters of three consonants can occur and are almost always of the form CsC.

The most basic and common syllable structures are CV and CVC.

=== Stress and pitch accent ===
Stress is assigned based on a set of very complex rules, and a difference in stress and accent systems is one of the most prominent distinguishing features between Maliseet and Passamaquoddy. In Passamaquoddy, some vowels are considered stressable while others are not. Stressable vowels are available to be acted on by stress rules, while unstressable vowels might undergo syncope. Stress is assigned (to stressable vowels only) to initial syllables and even-numbered syllables, counting from right to left. There is a simultaneous left to right process that reassigns some unstressable vowels as stressable. Unstressable vowels which do not become stressable based on the left to right process are proposed to be subject to syncope based on five rules. Maliseet has a similar approach, but the finer details of the stress assignment rules are different.

In addition to stress rules, some rules assign pitch to some syllables based on their position in the words. Passamaquoddy stressed syllables can be relatively high-pitched or low-pitched, and final unstressed syllables can be distinctively low-pitched. Maliseet has slightly varied pitch assignments.

== Morphology ==
There are four categories of words in Maliseet-Passamaquoddy: nouns, pronouns, verbs, and particles; every type except particles are inflected. Like other Algonquian languages, Maliseet-Passamaquoddy is polysynthetic, often combining many morphemes into one-word unit. It is also fairly agglutinative, with many morphemes generally corresponding to a single unit of meaning.

=== Nouns ===
A fundamental characteristic of Maliseet-Passamaquoddy is that all nouns and pronouns have noun classes: Like other Algonquian languages, nouns are either animate or inanimate. All abstract nouns (such as prayer, happiness, the past) are inanimate; people, personal names, animals, and trees are all animate. There is no perfect correspondence between the inherent "animateness" of a noun and its class for all words. However, the words for 'fingernail' and 'knee' are animate, but the words for 'heart' and 'tongue' are inanimate. Verbs impose restrictions on the noun class that one of their arguments must be. The easiest way to distinguish animate and inanimate nouns is by their plural forms. Animate plural nouns end in -k, and inanimate plural nouns end in -l.

In addition to class and number, animate nouns and pronouns (except 'I', 'we', and 'you') are marked in sentences as either proximate or obviative. Inanimate nouns are never marked as obviative. Proximate nouns refer to something near the speaker or most central to the discourse, while obviative nouns refer to something that is distanced or more remote from consideration. When two nouns or pronouns are conjoined, they can both be proximate or both obviative. In all other cases, when two or more animate nouns or pronouns appear in the same clause, one will be proximate (the focus of the clause), and the others will be obviative. Proximate is the "default" noun ending; obviative forms use different endings.

Additionally, nouns can also be inflected for the absentative, locative, and (with some nouns) vocative cases. The Passamaquoddy-Maliseet Language Portal includes a chart showing all the possible declensions of nouns in various forms. Notably, the absentative case is marked not only with endings but also changes in pitch contour.

Nouns can also be marked with diminutive and/or feminine suffixes. When these are combined with case markings, the order of suffixes is as follows:

1. Noun stem
2. Feminine suffix
3. Diminutive suffix
4. Locative, absentative, or vocative ending
5. Number/gender/obviation ending

Some nouns cannot appear in an unpossessed form—that is, they must appear with one of the personal pronoun prefixes. All body parts and kinship terms are in this class. For each of these words, there is a corresponding word that can appear unpossessed. For example, 'temisol 'dog' must appear in a possessed form, but olomuss 'dog' is usually never possessed.

Nouns can be used in apposition with other nouns and function as adjectives (which do not exist as a separate class of words).

Participles can be formed from the Changed Conjunct form of a verb and use the special plural endings -ik (animate) or -il (inanimate).

=== Pronouns ===
There are five types of pronouns: personal, demonstrative, interrogative, the word other, and a hesitator/filler pronoun.

Personal pronouns differ from nouns and other pronouns in that they do not use plural markers, but instead, each form is unique. The third person is gender-neutral, and there are both inclusive and exclusive forms of the second person plural pronoun. The first and second person singular also have longer emphatic forms:

Personal pronouns
	Singular	Plural
First person	nìl, nilá 'I, me'	nilùn 'we, us (exclusive)'
First person	nìl, nilá 'I, me'	kilùn 'we, us (inclusive)'
Second person	kìl, kilá 'you (singular)'	kiluwìw 'you (plural)'
Third person	nékom 'he/she, him/her'	nekomàw 'they, them'

(In the above chart, acute accents show relatively high pitch, and grave accents show relatively low pitch. Pitch is usually not marked except in dictionaries to distinguish similar words.)

There are three demonstrative pronouns, which have both animate and inanimate forms and are inflected for number, obviation, and absentativity:

- wot-yut 'this, near me'
- not-nit 'that, near the listener'
- yat-yet 'that, far from the speaker and listener but in sight'

The interrogative pronouns are wen 'who? (referring to animate noun)' and keq 'what? (referring to inanimate noun)'. They are also inflected for number, obviation, and absentativity.

The word kotok 'another, other' is a pronoun that also has animate and inanimate forms that can be inflected with various endings.

One of the most interesting features is the pronoun that functions similarly to English uh... or er..., but which is inflected to match the anticipated word. Compare the bolded pronoun in:

- nkisi puna ntahtuwossomut **ihik**... tuwihputik 'I put my cup on the **uh**... table.'

to:

- nkisewestuwama **iyey**... Mali 'I spoke to **uh**... Mary.'

=== Verbs ===
Verbs are built from word stems, which consist of one or more roots. Roots can be initial, medial, or final, and can be combined to build rich levels of meaning into a verb:

- Initial: usually adjectival or adverbial in meaning, such as color, quality, or state
  - **pus**kosone 'he/she has wet shoes' (**pus-** 'wet')
- Medial: can be nominal, adjectival, or adverbial; denote things such as body parts, geographic features, shapes, and arrangements; can be final if a verb is very "noun-like"
  - tomi**ptine**ssu 'he/she breaks his/her own arm' (**-ptine-** 'hand, arm')
  - kini**ptine** 'he/she has big hands' (**-ptine-** 'hand, arm')
- Final: verbal meanings, denoting actions, emotions or states
  - nmemi**hp** 'I have had enough to eat' (**-hp(i)-** 'eat')

Verbs are classified by the final root in their stem, which marks them as transitive or intransitive. Some verbs that have a direct object when they are translated into English are, in reality, intransitive verbs where the noun has been incorporated into the verb: posonut•ehk•e (basket-do.AI-3.sg) 'he/she makes baskets'.

Because Maliseet-Passamaquoddy is polysynthetic, a large amount of grammatical information is expressed in one verb through the use of various inflections and affixes:

	Possibilities	Expressed by
Gender	animate, inanimate	final root vowels, inflectional endings
Transitivity	transitive, intransitive	final root vowels, inflectional endings
Person	first, second, third, third obviate	inflections
Number	singular, plural	inflectional endings; theme markers in ai verbs
Hierarchy	direct, inverse; reflexive, reciprocal	prefixes; theme markers in ta verbs
Aspect	positive, neg	separate endings in most forms
Mode	indicative, conjunct, subordinative, imperative	stem shape, inflection
Tense	present, absentative, dubitative, preterite	inflectional endings

The possible modes and how they are used in sentences are:

- Independent indicative: used in main clauses of statement and yes–no questions
- Changed conjunct: usually used in adverbial clauses or in "who", "what", and "why" questions
- Unchanged conjunct: used in "if" clauses and sentences beginning with nopal 'if only'
- Subordinative: used mainly in clauses to express subsequent or resulting action; can also be used alone as a "polite" imperative or as a second command following an imperative; also used in "how" questions
- Imperative: used for direct commands
- Conjunct imperative: used for indirect commands (third person subjects)

The possible tenses are:

- Present: actions in present time; also used as basic past tense or for future when combined with particles such as
- Preterite: past completed action; used with Independent Indicative, Changed Conjunct, and Subordinative modes
- Dubitative preterite: expresses doubt or uncertainty; used with Independent Indicative, Changed Conjunct, Unchanged Conjunct, and Subordinative modes; also marked for Preterite when in Independent Indicative or Unchanged Conjunct
- Absentative: refers to an absentative noun; used with Independent Indicative or Subordinative modes

The Peskotomuhkati-Wolastoqey Language Portal also includes verb charts showing extensive conjugations of different classes of verbs.

=== Particles ===
Particles are all the words in the language that are not inflected. They include:

- Cardinal numbers (ordinal numbers are nouns)
- Negative and positive particles
- Interjections
- Conjunctions
- Emphatic particles

== Syntax ==
The verb system is ergative–absolutive, meaning that the subjects of intransitive verbs behave like the objects of transitive verbs. Because of this, transitive and intransitive verbs have subcategories based on which gender one of their arguments must be, so that there are four major verb types:

	Animate	Inanimate
Intransitive	animate-intransitive AI	inanimate-intransitive II
Transitive	transitive-animate TA	transitive-inanimate TI

AI intransitive verbs can only be used with animate subjects; TI verbs can only be used with inanimate objects, etc.

Because verbs polysynthetic nature, subjects and objects are often not separate words, but affixes attached to the verbs; therefore, one word "sentences" are possible and even common.

=== Person hierarchy ===
Maliseet-Passamaquoddy, along with other Algonquian languages, is also a direct–inverse language, which means the subjects and objects of transitive verbs are marked differently in different contexts according to where they fall relative to each other on a "person hierarchy". The person hierarchy lays out which word is considered more salient or takes precedence over another form. Leavitt's grammar gives the following hierarchy:

Person hierarchy
1	Second person and first plural inclusive (kil, kiluwaw, kilun)
2	First person, not including 'you' (nil,nilun)
3	Third person (nekom, nekomaw)
4	Obviate forms
5	Inanimate nouns

The hierarchy comes into play in sentences with transitive-animate (TA) verbs. When a TA verb's subject is higher on the person hierarchy than the object, the verb is conjugated in the direct form. If the subject is lower on the hierarchy than the object, the verb is conjugated in the inverse form. The direct form is considered unmarked, and the inverse is shown by theme markers. Because of the direct–inverse system, Maliseet-Passamaquoddy does not have a clear way of otherwise showing active–passive distinction on verbs.

Another case for which the hierarchy is relevant is in reflexive and reciprocal verb forms. For them, the action is considered "self-contained" because they occur on the same level of the hierarchy. Thus, reflexive and reciprocal verbs are no longer transitive but become intransitive, with only one argument being shown and a reflexive or reciprocal theme marker used.

Some first- and second-person pronouns overlap in meaning; for example kilun 'we (inclusive)' includes within its meaning nil 'I'. Overlapping pairs of this sort cannot be used as the subject-object pair of a transitive verb. Leavitt gives the following chart outlining the restrictions on how first- and second-person subject-object pairs can occur for transitive verbs:

	nil	kil	nilun	kilun	kiluwaw
nil	R		--	--	
kil		R		--	--
nilun	--		R	--	
kilun	--	--	--	R	--
kiluwaw		--		--	R

(R means that a form will be reflexive or reciprocal and intransitive; -- means a combination is not allowed.)

=== Building sentences ===
Because so much grammatical information is encoded in each word, word order is very free. There are few restrictions on the order words can appear, especially in simple one-verb sentences. One of the only restrictions is that the negative particle must precede the verb, but other words may intervene.

There is no word for the verb to be in the language so identity sentences with no verb are possible. The word order is less free than in sentences with verbs and is fixed in negative identities.

Complex and compound sentences with two or more verbs can be created in multiple ways, such as these:

- the use of conjunctions;
- a main clause plus an embedded clause in the changed conjunct mode;
- a main clause plus a conditional clause in the changed or unchanged conjunct mode;
- sequential commands, with the first verb in the imperative mode and the second in the subordinative mode.
