= 2018 Polaris Music Prize =

Canadian music award

- Date: September 17, 2018
- Country: Canada
- Hosted by: Raina Douris
- Winner(s): Jeremy Dutcher, Wolastoqiyik Lintuwakonawa
- Website: polarismusicprize.ca

The 2018 edition of the Canadian Polaris Music Prize was presented on September 17, 2018. The gala was hosted by broadcaster Raina Douris.

== Grand jury ==
The Polaris committee announced the grand jury in August 2018. Jurors were Matt Carter of Grid City , Jill Krajewski of Noisey, Erin Lowers of Exclaim!, Dustin Riel McGladrey of the Aboriginal Multi-Media Society of Alberta, Marc-André Mongrain of Radio-Canada, Josh O'Kane of The Globe and Mail, Rosina Riccardo of CJAM-FM, Kate Wilson of The Georgia Straight, and freelance music writers J.D. Considine, Marie Mello and Anubha Momin.

== Shortlist ==
The ten-album shortlist was announced on July 17.

- Jeremy Dutcher, Wolastoqiyik Lintuwakonawa
- Alvvays, Antisocialites
- Jean-Michel Blais, Dans ma main
- Daniel Caesar, Freudian
- Pierre Kwenders, MAKANDA at the End of Space, the Beginning of Time
- Hubert Lenoir, Darlène
- Partner, In Search of Lost Time
- Snotty Nose Rez Kids, The Average Savage
- U.S. Girls, In a Poem Unlimited
- Weaves, Wide Open

== Longlist ==
The prize's preliminary 40-album longlist was announced on June 14.

- a l l i e, Nightshade
- Alvvays, Antisocialites
- Arcade Fire, Everything Now
- Bahamas, Earthtones
- The Barr Brothers, Queens of the Breakers
- Bernice, Puff LP: In the air without a shape
- Jean-Michel Blais, Dans ma main
- Bonjay, Lush Life
- Booji Boys, Weekend Rocker
- Philippe Brach, Le silence des troupeaux
- Cadence Weapon, Cadence Weapon
- Daniel Caesar, Freudian
- Jennifer Castle, Angels of Death
- Clairmont the Second, Lil Mont from the Ave
- Gord Downie, Introduce Yerself
- Jeremy Dutcher, Wolastoqiyik Lintuwakonawa
- Faith Healer, Try ;-)
- FRIGS, Basic Behaviour
- Zaki Ibrahim, The Secret Life of Planets
- Iskwé, The Fight Within
- Kacy & Clayton, The Siren's Song
- Lydia Képinski, Premier Juin
- Pierre Kwenders, MAKANDA at the End of Space, the Beginning of Time
- Pierre Lapointe, La Science du cœur
- Mélissa Laveaux, Radyo Siwèl
- Hubert Lenoir, Darlène
- Terra Lightfoot, New Mistakes
- Loud, Une année record
- Milk & Bone, Deception Bay
- Partner, In Search of Lost Time
- Propagandhi, Victory Lap
- Vivek Shraya and the Queer Songbook Orchestra, Part-Time Woman
- Sloan, 12
- Snotty Nose Rez Kids, The Average Savage
- U.S. Girls, In a Poem Unlimited
- The Weather Station, The Weather Station
- Weaves, Wide Open
- Charlotte Day Wilson, Stone Woman
- Donovan Woods, Both Ways
- Yamantaka // Sonic Titan, Dirt

== Heritage Prize ==
Nominees for the Polaris Heritage Prize, a separate award to honour classic Canadian albums released before the creation of the Polaris Prize, were announced at the main Polaris gala, and the winners were announced on October 23.

=== 1960–1975 ===
- Public: Neil Young, Everybody Knows This Is Nowhere
- Jury: Jean-Pierre Ferland, Jaune
- The Band, Music from Big Pink
- Beau Dommage, Beau Dommage
- Robert Charlebois and Louise Forestier, Lindberg
- Joni Mitchell, Court and Spark
- Jackie Mittoo, Wishbone
- The Oscar Peterson Trio, Night Train
- Buffy Sainte-Marie, It's My Way!
- Jackie Shane, Jackie Shane Live

=== 1976–1985 ===
- Public: Rush, 2112
- Jury: Bruce Cockburn, Stealing Fire
- D.O.A., Hardcore '81
- Fifth Column, To Sir With Hate
- Gowan, Strange Animal
- Martha and the Muffins, This Is the Ice Age
- Jackie Mittoo, Showcase Volume 3
- Stan Rogers, Fogarty's Cove
- Rough Trade, Avoid Freud
- Leroy Sibbles, On Top

=== 1986–1995 ===
- Public: Alanis Morissette, Jagged Little Pill
- Jury: Dream Warriors, And Now the Legacy Begins
- Daniel Bélanger, Les Insomniaques s'amusent
- k. d. lang, Ingénue
- Daniel Lanois, Acadie
- Maestro Fresh Wes, Symphony in Effect
- Main Source, Breaking Atoms
- Sarah McLachlan, Fumbling Towards Ecstasy
- John Oswald, Plunderphonics
- Voivod, Nothingface

=== 1996–2005 ===
- Public: Broken Social Scene, You Forgot It in People
- Jury: Kid Koala, Carpal Tunnel Syndrome
- Bran Van 3000, Glee
- Constantines, Shine a Light
- The Dears, No Cities Left
- Destroyer, Streethawk: A Seduction
- Esthero, Breath from Another
- Sarah Harmer, You Were Here
- The New Pornographers, Mass Romantic
- The Weakerthans, Left and Leaving
