= Weaves (album) =

Studio album by Weaves
- Released: June 17, 2016
- Genre: Indie rock
- Length: 38:05
- Label: Buzz

Weaves chronology
Weaves (EP) (2014)	Weaves (2016)	Wide Open (2017)

Weaves is the debut full-length album by the Canadian indie pop band of the same name (the band's initial release was an EP, also titled Weaves). Released on June 17, 2016, the album was nominated for Alternative Album of the Year at the 2017 Juno awards.

== Reception ==
The album received mostly positive reviews; the aggregator site Metacritic assigned it a weighted score of 74, indicating that critics were generally favorable. In Pitchfork, Ian Cohen assigned the album a score of 6.8 of a possible 10, saying that "Weaves is an impressive album about incapacitating infatuation, [but] it’s not always served by giving its ADD and OCD impulses equal say". Both Cohen and Mary Kate McGrath of Consequence note that Weaves is an attempt to make a case that indie rock can be musically innovative as a genre.

== Track listing ==
No.	Title	Length
1.	"Tick"	2:57
2.	"Birds & Bees"	3:06
3.	"Candy"	3:09
4.	"Shithole"	2:59
5.	"Eagle"	3:44
6.	"Two Oceans"	3:58
7.	"Human"	3:40
8.	"Coo Coo"	3:37
9.	"Sentence"	4:02
10.	"One More"	2:30
11.	"Stress"	4:21
