= Booji Boys =

Canadian garage punk band

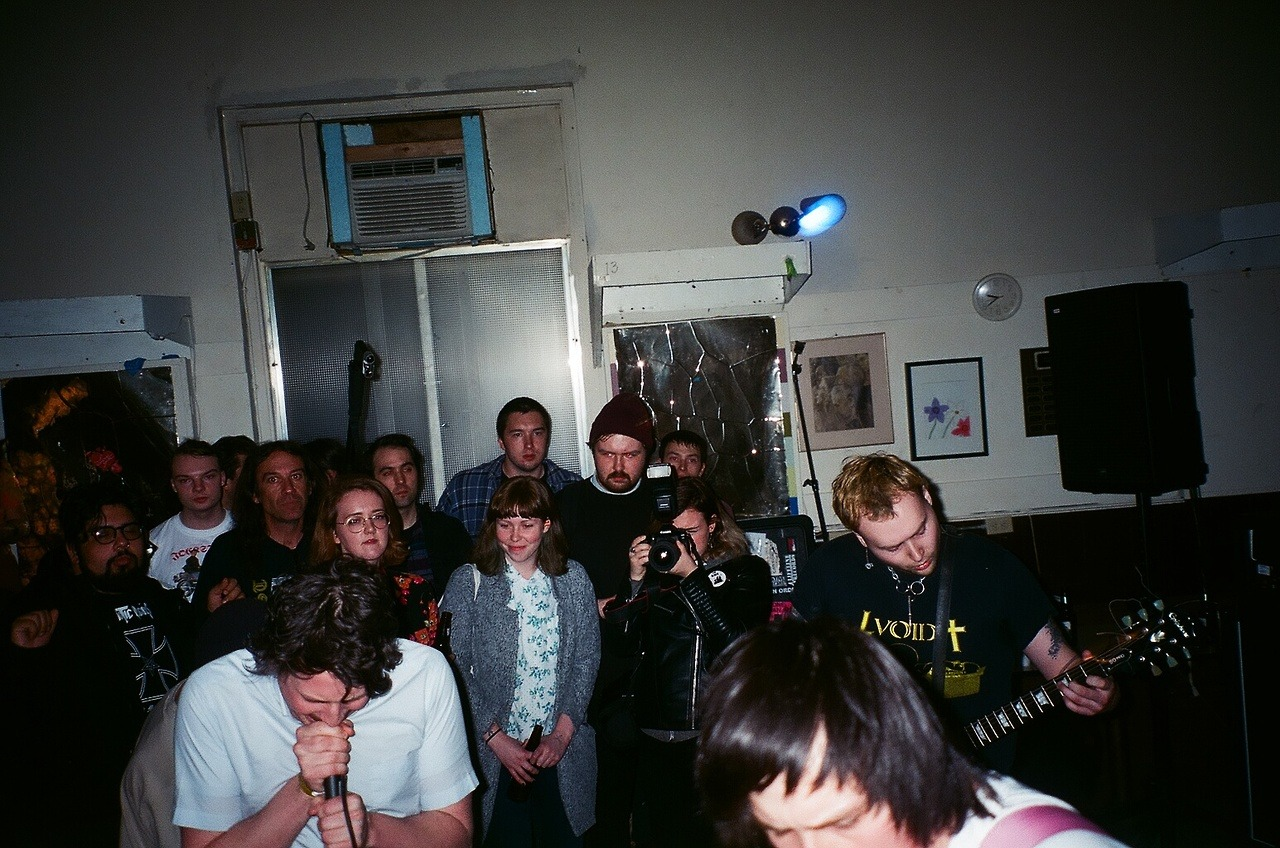
- Live in Toronto 2017 Live in 2017

Background information
- Origin: Halifax, Nova Scotia, Canada
- Genres: Punk rock, garage rock
- Years active: 2016–present
- Members: Alex Mitchell; Cody Googoo; Steve Earle; Adam LeDrew; Justin Crowe
- Website: boojiboysfuneral.bandcamp.com

Booji Boys are a Canadian garage punk band from Halifax, Nova Scotia. Their music blends DIY Hardcore and Power Pop. The band consists of vocalist Alex Mitchell, guitarists Cody Googoo and Steve Earle, bassist Adam LeDrew and drummer Justin Crowe, and are named for a Devo reference. They are most noted for their 2017 album Weekend Rocker, which was a longlisted nominee for the 2018 Polaris Music Prize.

== History ==
Booji Boys released a number of demo recordings before issuing their self-titled debut album in February 2017. Soon after they followed up with an EP, Sweet Boy, and a non-album cover of Gang Green's "Sold Out".

The band released an album, Weekend Rocker, in December 2017. The album appeared on the !earshot National Top 50 chart in February, 2018.

== Discography ==
- 6 Track Demo (2016)
- 06/04/2016 Practice Tape? (2016)
- Bad Boy 2016 LP Promo Tape (2016)
- Booji Boys (2017)
- Sweet Boy (2017)
- Weekend Rocker (2017)
- Unknown Pleathers (2018)
- Tube Reducer (2019)
