= Motewolonuwok =

Studio album by Jeremy Dutcher
- Released: October 6, 2023
- Genres: Classical, First Nations music
- Length: 41:20
- Label: Secret City Records
- Producers: Owen Pallett, Devon Bate

Jeremy Dutcher chronology
Wolastoqiyik Lintuwakonawa (2018)	Motewolonuwok (2023)

Motewolonuwok is the second full-length studio album by Jeremy Dutcher, released on Secret City Records in 2023.

Unlike his debut album Wolastoqiyik Lintuwakonawa, which was sung entirely in the Maliseet-Passamaquoddy language, Motewolonuwok features songs in both Maliseet-Passamaquoddy and English. It additionally represents Dutcher's first time recording new original songs he had written himself, rather than interpreting traditional Wolastoqey songs. Dutcher described the album's creative process as a tension between wanting to continue contributing to the visibility and revival of his ancestral indigenous language, while at the same time not wanting to become pigeonholed exclusively as an archivist, and described the creative challenge of trying to blend the two languages into one recording as a rewarding one.

The album was a Juno Award nominee for Adult Alternative Album of the Year at the Juno Awards of 2024, and was the winner of the 2024 Polaris Music Prize. Its Polaris victory, following Wolastoqiyik Lintuwakonawa winning that award in 2018, made Dutcher the first artist ever to win the prize twice.

The album won the Félix Award for Bilingual or Other Language Album of the Year at the 46th Félix Awards.

== Track listing ==
No.	Title	Length
1.	"Skicinuwihkuk"	4:56
2.	"Pomawsuwinuwok Wonakiyawolotuwok"	3:42
3.	"Take My Hand"	5:40
4.	"Wolasweltomultine"	5:46
5.	"tahcuwi Anelsultipon"	5:00
6.	"Sakom"	2:01
7.	"Ancestors Too Young"	5:27
8.	"The Land That Held Them"	3:31
9.	"There I Wander"	3:35
10.	"Together We Emerge"	4:18
11.	"Rise in Beauty"	4:01
