= Jon McMurray =

Jon James
Personal information
- Birth name: Jonathon James McMurray
- Born: July 28, 1984; Calgary, Alberta, Canada
- Died: October 20, 2018 (aged 34); Westwold, British Columbia
- Spouse: Kali James (Playboy Model)

Sport
- Country: Canada
- Sport: Freeskiing

Jon James (July 28, 1984 – October 20, 2018), born Jonathon James McMurray, was a professional freeskier, musician, stunt artist and film maker. He was born in Calgary, Alberta, Canada and based in Los Angeles, California, United States.

== Skiing ==
Known for combining freeskiing and extreme stunts, James was the first action sports personality to successfully land a back-flip transferring from rail to rail. He began his career as a professional athlete during high school, and competed and filmed internationally throughout North America, Europe, Australia, and New Zealand. He was featured in action sports movies by Matchstick Productions, Poorboyz Productions, Level 1 Productions, and others. In addition to receiving international exposure from Sports Illustrated Magazine, James was also the owner and founder of Loose Canon Productions, a film company that released the sports action lifestyle film Without A Cause. His major sponsors throughout his career included Oakley, Skull Candy, Rossignol, Rip Curl and Smith Optics.

== Injuries ==
James' tendency to perform dangerous stunts led to several serious injuries including seven surgeries, a fractured neck and a broken back on two separate occasions.

== Death ==
On October 20, 2018, James died while attempting to walk on the wing of an aircraft, a stunt known as wing walking, while filming a music video. James fell off the wing too close to the ground to deploy his back up parachute. He was 34.

== Film appearances ==
- The Hit List – Matchstick Productions
- The People Vs Brad Holmes – Chainsaw Productions
- Focused – Matchstick Productions
- Ready, Fire, Aim – Poorboyz Productions
- Strike Three – Level 1 Productions
- The Guatemalan Persuader – Mercon Industries
- No Stopping – Vision20 Media Australia
- Without A Cause – Loose Canon Productions
- Storm – Warren Miller
- Salad Days – Teton Gravity Research
- The Front Line (Ski Movie 3) – Matchstick Productions
- Happy Dayz – Poorboyz Productions

== Music ==
James began rapping and producing hip hop music while on tour in the action sports industry after breaking his back. He performed under the name Jon James, his legal first and middle name. His album Rex Leo was released 2016.

== Radio appearances ==
- SHADE45 FM "All out show, 'Hate it or love it'"

== Music video appearances ==
- "Million Dollar B!tch" – Published on Jan 22, 2013 by Loose Canon Playaz Inc.
- "Delinquent" (Featuring Hopsin) – Published on Feb 12, 2013 by Loose Canon Playaz Inc.
- "Game Over" (Featuring Tech N9ne & Madchild) – Published on Jun 11, 2013 by Loose Canon Playaz Inc.
- "Rockstar" – Published on Apr 1, 2014 by Loose Canon Playaz Inc.
- "Hello" – Published on Sep 1, 2015 by Rex Leo
- "Last Words" – Published on Oct 31, 2015 by Rex Leo
- "Blue" – Published on Jul 22, 2016 by Rex Leo
- "Addicted" – Published on Aug 1, 2016 by Rex Leo
- "Dead Clocks" – Published on Nov 3, 2016 by Rex Leo
