= Radio Starmaker Fund =

Organization funding Canadian musicians

The Radio Starmaker Fund is a private fund developed by the Canadian Association of Broadcasters with the approval of the Canadian Radio-television and Telecommunications Commission (CRTC). It is a private fund that supports new emerging artists with substantial investments in their careers.

Established in 2001, the fund had awarded almost $170 million to Canadian musicians over its lifetime as of 2024.
