= Jay Weigel =

American musician

Jay Weigel is a Grammy–winning composer, producer, conductor, arranger, orchestrator, and contractor for film, television, recordings, and concerts.

From 1998 to 2001, he worked as an orchestrator, assistant conductor, and head music preparatory for composer Terence Blanchard. From 1985 to 1991 he was lecturer of Composition and Orchestration at Xavier University in New Orleans. Weigel helped organize the Louisiana Composers Guild, and served as the co-chairman of the Louisiana Music Commission from 1998 to 2004.

Weigel served as executive director of the Contemporary Arts Center, CAC, in New Orleans from 1996 to 2013. Prior to this appointment, Weigel was music director of the CAC for eleven years.

Since 2013, Weigel has returned to composing full-time, and is constantly in-demand as a New Orleans–based composer.

== Operas ==
In 1998 Weigel premiered his contemporary opera Ash Wednesday to New Orleans audiences at the opening event of the Faulkner Festival. Weigel's post-modern opera, Dawn in the Floating City, was presented at the New Orleans Center for Creative Arts in 2002. The opera examines the dialogue between the communities that make up the culture of New Orleans. For his third opera, 7 Days in Paradise, Weigel collaborated with Harold Sylvester. This work was premiered in 2007 and was based on the Hurricane Katrina experiences of artist Jeffery Cook.

The Ogden Museum of Southern Art commissioned his fourth opera, The River May Cry, featuring a successful integration of European classical music with blues, gospel, jazz and African music, and utilizing a diverse array of musicians to perform this original work. An oratorio derived from the opera was recorded and released in 2004. In 2004, the St. Louis Cathedral commissioned Weigel's Mass of Pope John Paul II, who died two weeks before the premiere of the work in 2005. In 2008, the University of Southern Mississippi commissioned and performed his work Renaissance for orchestra and choir.

== Departure from the CAC ==
In 2013 Weigel stepped aside as executive director after having raised a $3 million endowment for the CAC. Weigel left the center to resume a full-time career as a composer. His tenure oversaw the donation of its current building on Camp St., a return to normalcy for the CAC after Hurricane Katrina, the financial hardships of the economic collapse of 2008, and the turmoil of the BP oil spill.

== Return to composing ==
Weigel has been a staunch advocate for sound recording credits in the state of Louisiana. He served as the liaison for Warner Brothers while they recorded the scores for the feature films Midnight Special and Our Brand is Crisis, both composed by David Wingo. Weigel orchestrated and conducted the music.

In 2014 he produced Paul Sanchez’ acclaimed album The World is Round, Everything That Ends Begins Again.

In 2016 Weigel began composing the music for Tyler Perry's “Too Close To Home”, and in 2017 arranged the music for the Andra Day-fronted track “I Wish I Knew How It Would Feel To Be Free” from Tyler Perry's Acrimony. Weigel's music was also featured in a number of episodes of NCIS: New Orleans.

2017 saw Weigel's involvement in the Academy Award-winning DreamWorks picture Green Book, starring Viggo Mortensen and Mahershala Ali, for which he was the Music Contractor for the additional music. His soundtrack for Camp Cool Kids was released on iTunes in July 2017.

For the Tricentennial of New Orleans in 2018, The Louisiana Philharmonic commissioned an orchestral piece from Weigel. The piece, a tone poem called “New Orleans Concerto for Orchestra”, premiered on November 29, 2018, and pays homage to a variety of different styles of music heard throughout New Orleans. The piece was conducted by, and dedicated to Carlos Miguel Prieto, the same year he was awarded Musical America's Conductor of the Year. The piece was one of the first instances of the scoring software Dorico being used for a major orchestral premiere. A recording was released in 2020, also conducted by Prieto.

Also in 2018, Weigel composed the musical score for the movie The Last Laugh, for Netflix. It was co-composed with director Greg Pritikin, and stars Richard Dreyfuss and Chevy Chase.

In 2019, Weigel arranged and conducted strings on four songs on PJ Morton's Grammy-winning album “Paul”.

From 2019 through 2020, Weigel composed the music for the first season of Tyler Perry's The Oval, on BET. In 2020, Weigel scored another Tyler Perry project, the movie “A Fall From Grace”, starring Crystal Fox and Phylicia Rashad. It was the first Tyler Perry film released on Netflix, and was viewed 26 million times in its first week.

In July 2020, Weigel produced a song for the Louisiana Civil Rights Trail, which featured two-time Grammy winner PJ Morton, singer Tank from Tank and the Bangas, and “The King of New Orleans Blues” Chris Thomas King.

Jay currently operates a studio space within Esplanade Studios, located in Mid City, New Orleans.
