= Bonjay =

Canadian R&B musical group

- Origin: Toronto, Ontario, Canada
- Genres: R&B
- Years active: 2007–present
- Labels: Mysteries of Trade
- Members: Alanna Stuart; Ian Swain
- Website: http://bonjaymusic.com

Bonjay is a Canadian R&B musical group from Toronto, Ontario, consisting of vocalist Alanna Stuart and instrumentalist Ian Swain.

== History ==
Stuart, who also performs with the Queer Songbook Orchestra and was formerly a host on CBC Radio 3, met Swain in Ottawa, where he was working as a disk jockey. The pair released their debut EP Broughtupsy in 2010, and toured in support of the release, including at the Winnipeg International Jazz Festival, before taking an extended hiatus.

Stuart and Swain reunited in 2015 with the single "Ingenue". The full-length album Lush Life followed in 2018, and was a long-listed nominee for the 2018 Polaris Music Prize. The duo supported the album with a short tour in conjunction with Vivek Shraya's Too Attached project. That year they performed as part of the 2018 Hamilton Supercrawl.

== Discography ==
Albums

- Lush Life (2018), Mysteries of Trade

EPs

- Gimmee Gimmee (2009), Independent
- Broughtupsy (2010), Mysteries of Trade

Singles

- "Maps" (2007), XL Recordings, Ghetto Arc
- "Stumble" / "Creepin" (2011), One Bird Records
- "Ingenue" (2015), Memeplex
- "Chelsea" (2018), Mysteries of Trade
- "Medicine For Melancholy" (2018), Mysteries of Trade
