= Queer Songbook Orchestra =

Canadian chamber pop ensemble

Queer Songbook Orchestra are a Canadian chamber pop ensemble, who record and perform orchestral versions of pop songs with meaning to the LGBTQ community. Songs performed by the orchestra do not necessarily have to be explicitly LGBTQ-themed; the group's stated selection criteria permits any song that can be paired with a compelling story about how that song has "touched a queer life in a way".

In concert, each song performed is paired with a recitation of the background story that inspired the group to perform the song. The submitted stories are also collected for posterity by the Canadian Lesbian and Gay Archives.

== Membership ==
Launched by artistic director Shaun Brodie in 2014, the group's core members include vocalists Alanna Stuart and Alex Samaras, poet Stephen Jackman-Torkoff, violinist Jennifer Burford, cellist Evan Lamberton, oboist and English horn player Lief Mosbaugh, French horn player Micajah Sturgess, guitarist Thom Gill, double bassist Dan Fortin, and percussionist Stefan Schneider. A rotating collective of other musicians and storytellers have also collaborated with the group at individual performances, including Carole Pope, Beverly Glenn-Copeland, Leah Fay, Vivek Shraya, Mary Margaret O'Hara, Gwen Benaway, Mark Tewksbury, Veda Hille, Lorraine Segato, Bill Richardson, Gentleman Reg, Gary Beals, Louis Negin, Wayson Choy, Rémy Huberdeau, Simone Schmidt, Torquil Campbell, Daniela Gesundheit, Katie Ritchie, Casey Mecija, Cris Derksen, Rae Spoon, and Safia Nolin.

== Live performances ==
The group performed for the first time at Toronto's Videofag in 2014. In 2015, they gave their first live performance outside Toronto, performing at St. Alban's Anglican Church in Ottawa. In recent years they have performed an annual show at Buddies in Bad Times during Pride Toronto, and have performed at various arts festivals throughout Canada. In the fall of 2018, they undertook a 12-city national tour.

== Recordings ==
The group collaborated with Vivek Shraya on her 2017 album Part Time Woman, which was a longlisted nominee for the 2018 Polaris Music Prize. In 2018, they released their own debut album, Anthems & Icons, which includes renditions of songs by k.d. lang, Billy Strayhorn, Rita MacNeil, Joe Meek, Gene MacLellan, Melissa Etheridge, and Arthur Russell.
