= Hubert Lenoir =

French Canadian musician (born 1994)

- Hubert Lenoir in 2019

Background information
- Born: Hubert Alexis Chiasson; August 14, 1994 (age 32); Quebec City, Quebec
- Genres: art pop; rock; experimental
- Occupation: singer-songwriter
- Instruments: Vocals, guitar, keyboard, bass
- Years active: 2012-present
- Label: Simone Records Terrible Records
- Website: darlenedarling.com

Hubert Lenoir (born August 14, 1994) is the stage name of Hubert Chiasson, a French Canadian, singer, musician and actor from Quebec City, Quebec. His debut solo album Darlène was a shortlisted finalist for the 2018 Polaris Music Prize.

== Career ==
Originally from Quebec City, Chiasson and his older brother Julien released an album in 2015 under the band name The Seasons.

Darlène, a concept album about a love affair between a young woman from Quebec and a suicidal American tourist, was released concurrently with a novel of the same name by Chiasson's partner, writer Noémie D. Leclerc. The album incorporates glam rock, psychedelic rock and chanson influences. The album did not receive wide notice at first, but broke through to wider attention when he was invited to perform the single "Fille de personne II" on the sixth season finale of La Voix in May 2018. The Polaris nomination, in turn, resulted in media attention in both English Canada and the United States, markets where francophone artists from Quebec rarely break through without adding English material to their repertoires.

He won three Prix Félix at the Gala de l'ADISQ in 2018, for Album of the Year (Darlène), Single of the Year ("Fille de personne II") and New Artist of the Year.

At the Juno Awards of 2019, Darlène received three nominations, for Album of the Year, Pop Album of the Year and Francophone Album of the Year.

He had his first acting role in Jesse Noah Klein's 2021 film Like a House on Fire.

In 2022 he won the SOCAN Songwriting Prize for his song "Secret".

His 2021 album PICTURA DE IPSE: Musique directe was a Juno nominee for Francophone Album of the Year at the Juno Awards of 2023.

== Discography ==
=== Albums ===
- 2018: Darlène
- 2021: PICTURA DE IPSE: Musique directe

=== Singles ===
- 2018: "Fille de personne II"
- 2018: "Recommencer"
- 2019: "hunny bunny (feat. Kirin J Callinan)"
- 2021: "uber lenoir, c'est confirmé"
- 2021: "SECRET"
- 2021: "DIMANCHE SOIR"
- 2021: "OCTEMBRE (feat. Bonnie Banane)''

== Awards and nominations ==
- Winner « Révélation of the Year », Gala ADISQ (2018)
- Winner« Album of the Year - Pop » for the album Darlène, Gala ADISQ (2018)
- Winner « Song of the Year » for the song Fille de personne II, Gala ADISQ (2018)
- Winner « Album of the Year - Critics Choice » for the Darlène, Gala ADISQ (2018)
- Nomination « Male Artist of the Year », Gala ADISQ (2018)
- Nomination « Composer of the Year » for the album Darlène, Gala ADISQ (2018)
- Nomination « Producer of the Year » for the album Darlène, Gala ADISQ (2018)
- «Révélation» Prize, SOCAN Gala (2018)
- Eval-Maginat Prize for emerging talent, SPACQ Gala (2018)
- Finalist for the Polaris Music Prize Darlène (2018)
- Winner « Prix Espoir FEQ », Festival d’été de Québec (2018)
- Winner « Prix Félix-Leclerc de la Chanson », Fondation Félix-Leclerc (2018)
- Nomination « Best Low Budget » for song A REQUEST TO KANYE WEST, Berlin Music Video Awards (2019)
