= Weaves (band) =

Canadian indie pop band

- Origin: Toronto, Ontario, Canada
- Genres: Indie rock, indie pop, art pop
- Years active: 2012–present (on hiatus 2020–present)
- Members: Jasmyn Burke; Morgan Waters; Zach Bines; Spencer Cole

Weaves is a Canadian indie pop band from Toronto, Ontario, consisting of vocalist Jasmyn Burke, guitarist Morgan Waters, drummer Spencer Cole, and bassist Zach Bines.

== History ==
The band was formed in 2012 by Burke and Waters, who first met each other in a bar and began recording demo songs based on files of song ideas Burke recorded on her iPhone. In 2013, Bines and Cole joined the band shortly before recording commenced on their debut EP. They released the self-titled debut EP in 2014, and followed up with a self-titled full-length album in 2016.

The 2016 album was shortlisted for both the Juno Award for Alternative Album of the Year and the 2017 Polaris Music Prize in 2017, as well as garnering a SOCAN Songwriting Prize nomination for the song "Shithole".

The band's second full-length album, Wide Open, was released on October 6, 2017. It was shortlisted for Alternative Album of the Year at the Juno Awards of 2018. In 2018, they received another SOCAN Songwriting Prize nomination for the song "Walkaway", and the album was a shortlisted finalist for the 2018 Polaris Music Prize.

As of 2025, Weaves had not been gathered since spring 2020, according to Spencer.

== Discography ==
- Weaves (EP, 2014)
- Weaves (LP, 2016)
- Wide Open (2017)
