= Wolastoqiyik Lintuwakonawa =

Album of Canadian First Nations music

Studio album by Jeremy Dutcher
- Released: April 6, 2018
- Recorded: 2017–2018
- Studios: Union Sound, Studio PM
- Genres: Classical, First Nations music
- Length: 44:20
- Label: Self-released
- Producers: Jeremy Dutcher, BUFFLO

Jeremy Dutcher chronology
Wolastoqiyik Lintuwakonawa (2018)	Motewolonuwok (2023)

Wolastoqiyik Lintuwakonawa is the debut studio album by the Indigenous Canadian composer and tenor Jeremy Dutcher, self-released on April 6, 2018. The album, featuring post-classical rearrangement of traditional First Nations music, was the winner of the 2018 Polaris Music Prize.

== Background ==
Dutcher began his academic studies at Dalhousie University studying music but shifted his focus to anthropological research on his Wolastoq community where he grew up.

Guided by the suggestion of a Wolastoqiyik elder, teacher, and song carrier named Maggie Paul he began to study traditional songs which eventually led the classically trained opera singer to start a research project at the Canadian Museum of History. There he explored an extensive collection of documents, photographs and recordings made by anthropologist William Mechling between 1907 and 1914 when he spent time in Indigenous communities documenting the languages and cultures under the assumption they were soon to disappear.

Among the documents, Dutcher focused on transcribing a collection of wax cylinder recordings of Wolastoqiyik people singing their traditional songs.

Originally, Dutcher says he didn't envision the transcriptions being part of an album, but as he spent more time with them at home he began to consider ways to incorporate his musical interests with his historical preservation efforts. He eventually obtained digital copies of the wax cylinder recordings that he listened to on his headphones while riding public transit in Toronto and at home in the dark.

With very little representation of Indigenous peoples or cultures in the traditional classical music canon, Dutcher wanted to expose his heritage to the genre, but more importantly to him, he wanted to produce an album which brought the endangered language to new generations of Wolastoqiyik people.

Some of the original wax cylinder recordings are sampled throughout the album.

The lead single, "Mehcinut" features Dutcher singing in his ancestral language before Jim Pauli, a voice from the archival recordings, emerges in the middle of the song to perform with him as the track builds to its crescendo.

Paul's voice is heard on the album track "Eqpahak", stating "when you bring the songs back, you're going to bring the people back, you're going to bring everything back."

The album's cultural context is also reflected in its cover art, which recreates a period scene of an anthropologist recording the songs; on the front cover, Dutcher is depicted sitting in the position of the singer being recorded, while on the back cover he is depicted sitting in the position of the anthropologist.

== Promotion ==
The album was premiered on the Billboard website on April 5, 2018. Dutcher explained during an interview with the magazine that he wanted to counter the "bilingual Anglo-centric Canadian music narrative". The album was fully released on April 6, 2018.

== Critical reception ==
Exclaim! rated the album a 9 out of 10. NPR Music ranked it the 20th best album of 2018, stating that it "serves as an intervention in the ripples of shame and fear that have, over time, buried tradition". Alexander Smail gave the album 8 starts out of 10 in Loud and Quiet.

Wolastoqiyik Lintuwakonawa was the winning album of the 2018 Polaris Music Prize, and was nominated in five East Coast Music Awards categories. The album also received the Juno Award for Indigenous Music Album of the Year at the Juno Awards of 2019.

== Track listing ==
All tracks written and produced by Jeremy Dutcher and BUFFLO.

No.	Title	Length
1.	Mehcinut	4:47
2.	Essuwonike	5:43
3.	Eqpahak	3:05
4.	Ultestakon	3:41
5.	'kotuwossomikhal	1:59
6.	Sakomawit	3:32
7.	Oqiton	3:51
8.	Nipuwoltin	2:10
9.	Pomok naka Poktoinskwes	6:10
10.	Qonute	3:34
11.	Koselwintuwakon	2:48
Total length:		44:20

== Personnel ==
=== Musicians ===
- Jeremy Dutcher – piano and voice
- Devon Bate – electronics
- Teiya Kasahara – soprano
- Ian Gibbons – cello
- Justin Wright – cello
- Kate Maloney – violin
- Taylor Miltz – violin
- Lucas Blekeberg – viola
- Alex K.S. – double bass
- Sierra Noble – fiddle
- Brandon Valdivia – percussion
- BUFFLO & Jeremy Dutcher – producer
- Pascal Shefteshy – mixing
- Jonathan Kaspy – mastering

=== Album artwork ===
- Kent Monkman and Jeremy Dutcher
- Matt Barnes – photography
- Monique Aura Bedard – ancestral images
- Chris Hadzipetros – layout

== Charts ==
Chart (2018)	Peak position
Canadian Albums (Billboard)	83

== Awards and nominations ==
The album was named the winner of the 2018 Polaris Music Prize, and for the Juno Award for Indigenous Music Album of the Year.

Year	Award	Category	Nominee/Work	Result	Ref
2018	Polaris Music Prize	Shortlisted	Wolastoqiyik Lintuwakonawa	Won	
2019	Juno Award	Indigenous Music Album of the Year	Wolastoqiyik Lintuwakonawa	Won	
