= Zaki Ibrahim =

South African-Canadian singer-songwriter

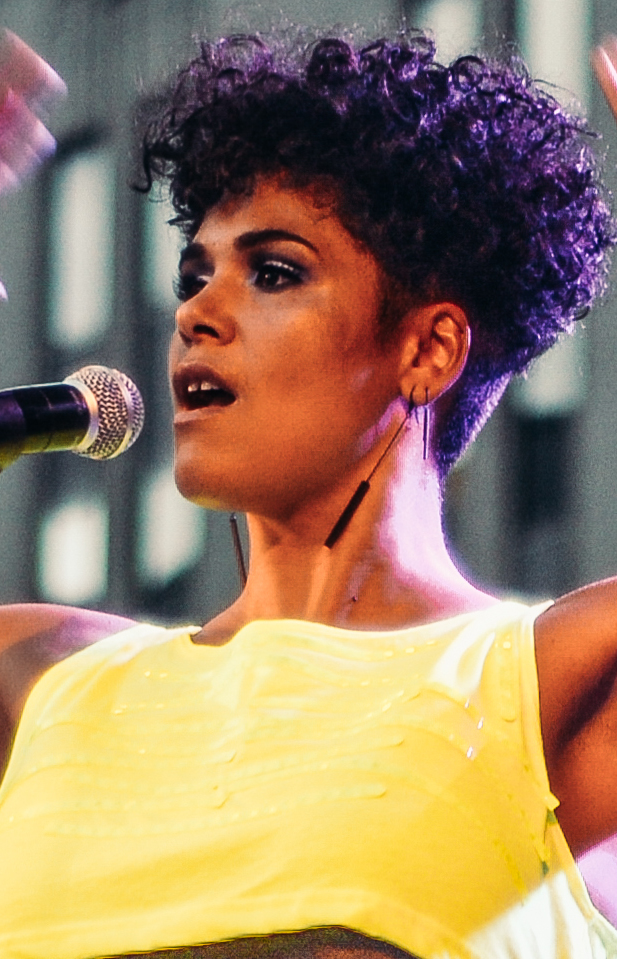
- Zaki Ibrahim in 2016.

Background information
- Born: British Columbia
- Genres: R&B, soul and jazz
- Occupation: Singer
- Instrument: Vocals
- Years active: 2006–present

Zaki Ibrahim is a South African-Canadian singer-songwriter. Her music blends R&B, soul and jazz.

== Career ==
Born in British Columbia to a father originally from South Africa and a mother from the United Kingdom, Ibrahim spent her childhood as what she describes as a "citizen of the world", living at different times in Canada, South Africa, the United Kingdom and France . Her father, Zane Ibrahim, was a pioneering radio broadcaster in South Africa, who was one of the founders of the influential community radio station Bush Radio.

She moved to Toronto, Ontario in the mid-2000s, and soon became a popular draw on the city's live music scene. She released her debut EP, Shö (Iqra in Orange), in 2006. Following one show at the El Mocambo in 2007, her production team and supporting musicians immediately formed an assembly line to produce and burn a compact disc recording of the just-completed show for immediate sale; the lineup to purchase copies extended well outside the club's front door.

She released a second EP, Eclectica (Episodes in Purple), in 2008. Her live shows to support the EP included an appearance with Bedouin Soundclash at the 2008 MuchMusic Video Awards, and a show opening for Erykah Badu at Massey Hall. She garnered a Juno Award nomination for R&B/Soul Recording of the Year at the Juno Awards of 2009 for her single "Money". Her song "Ansomnia" was included in the 2010 film soundtrack For Colored Girls: Music From and Inspired by the Original Motion Picture Soundtrack.

Her first full-length album, Every Opposite, was released in 2012. The album was named as a longlisted nominee for the 2013 Polaris Music Prize on June 13, 2013, and subsequently named to the short list on July 16, 2013.

She is currently based in Toronto Ontario.

== Albums ==
- Shö (Iqra in Orange) - 2006
- Eclectica (Episodes in Purple) - 2008
- Every Opposite - 2012
- The Secret Life of Planets - 2018
