= Jeremy Dutcher =

Indigenous Canadian musician (born 1990)

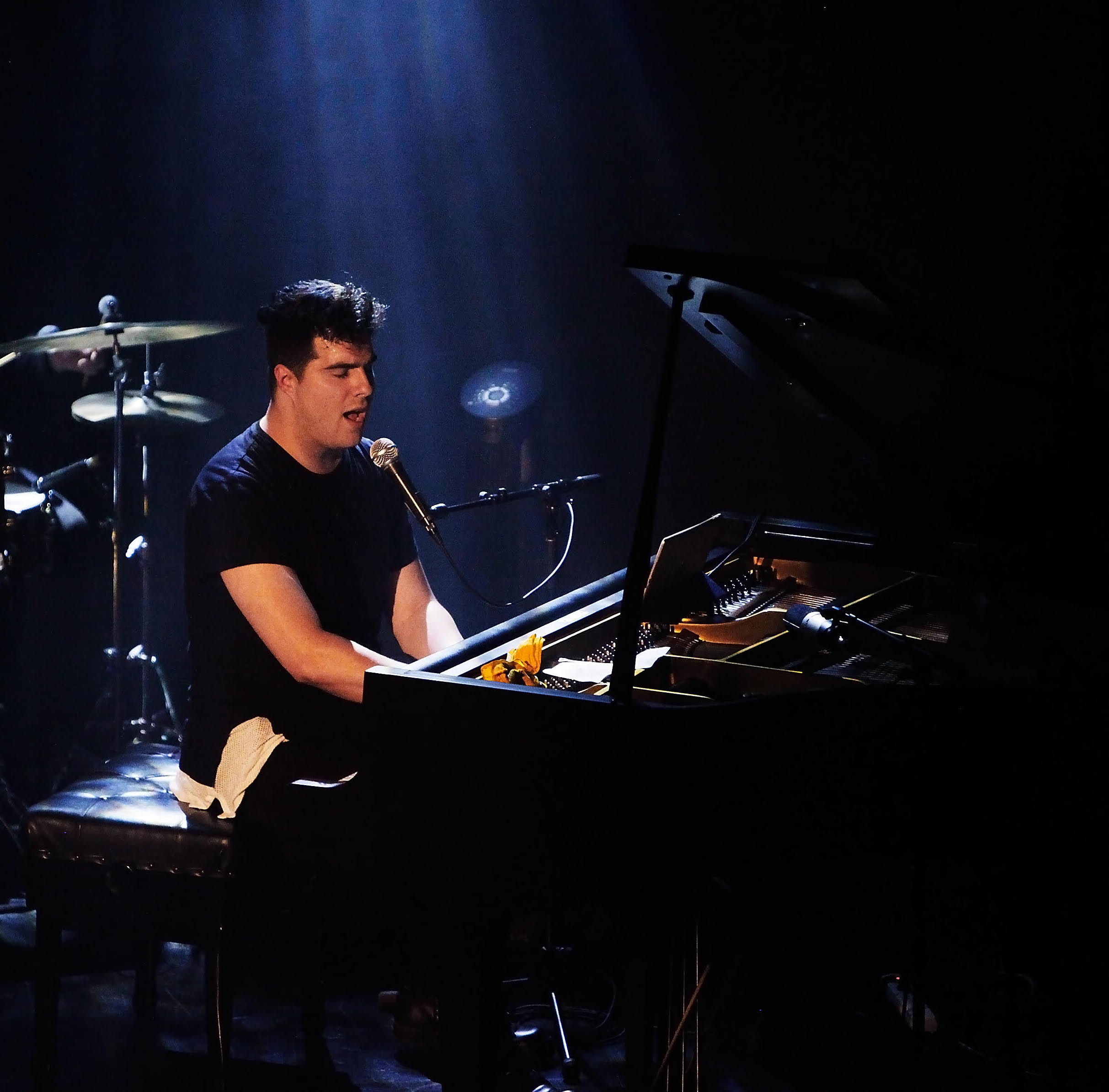
- Jeremy Dutcher live in concert at The Great Hall in Toronto, Ontario, 2018

Background information
- Born: November 8, 1990 (age 35); Fredericton, New Brunswick, Canada
- Origin: Fredericton
- Genres: Classical; Indigenous; opera
- Occupations: Singer, pianist, composer, activist
- Years active: 2014–present
- Label: Secret City Records
- Website: jeremydutcher.com

Jeremy Dutcher is a classically trained Indigenous Canadian tenor, composer, musicologist, performer and activist, who previously lived in Toronto, Ontario and currently lives in Montréal, Québec. He became widely known for his first album, Wolastoqiyik Lintuwakonawa, which won the 2018 Polaris Music Prize and the Juno Award for Indigenous Music Album of the Year at the 2019 Juno Awards.

== Biography ==
A Wolastoqiyik (Maliseet) member of the Tobique First Nation in North-West New Brunswick, Dutcher studied music and anthropology at Dalhousie University. After training as an operatic tenor in the Western classical tradition, he expanded his professional repertoire to include the traditional singing style and songs of his community.

He recorded Wolastoqiyik Lintuwakonawa following a research project on archival recordings of traditional Maliseet songs at the Canadian Museum of History, many of which are no longer being passed down to contemporary Maliseet youth.

In 2021, Dutcher collaborated with cellist Yo-Yo Ma on the "Honor Song" by composer George Paul. The track is included on Ma's album "Notes for the Future". Dutcher sang the song in original Mi'kmaq as well as in Wolastoqey, his own language.

He appeared as a guest judge in an episode of the third season of Canada's Drag Race in 2022.

Dutcher held fundraising concerts and donated to the Kehkimin Wolastoqey Language Immersion School, founded by his mother, Lisa Perley-Dutcher. "I think it's a really exciting moment for linguistic revitalization in Wolastoq territory," Dutcher told APTN News.

In 2023, he released the album Motewolonuwok on Secret City Records. The album again features some songs performed in the Maliseet-Passamaquoddy language like on his debut, but also features some English-language songs. The album was a Juno Award nominee for Adult Alternative Album of the Year at the Juno Awards of 2024, and winner of the 2024 Polaris Music Prize, making Dutcher the first artist in Polaris history to win the prize twice.

Dutcher is the 2025 National Arts Centre Award laureate, presented by Her Excellency the Right Honourable Mary Simon, Governor General of Canada. At the Governor General’s Performing Arts Awards Gala, Dutcher performed with Inuk singer-songwriter Susan Aglukark.

Dutcher identifies as two-spirit, a modern, pan-Indian, umbrella term used by some Indigenous North Americans to describe aboriginal people fulfilling a traditional third-gender (or other gender-variant) ceremonial cultural role in their community.

== Discography ==
- Wolastoqiyik Lintuwakonawa (2018)
- Motewolonuwok (2023)

== Awards and nominations ==
Year	Award	Category	Nominee/work	Result	Ref
2018	Polaris Music Prize	Shortlisted	Wolastoqiyik Lintuwakonawa	Won	
2019	Juno Awards	Indigenous Music Album of the Year	Wolastoqiyik Lintuwakonawa	Won	
2024	Juno Awards	Adult Alternative Album of the Year	Motewolonuwok	Nominated	
2024	Polaris Music Prize	Shortlisted	Motewolonuwok	Won	
2025	Governor General's Performing Arts Award	National Arts Centre Award	Himself	Won	
2025	Atlantic International Film Festival	Best Atlantic Score	At the Place of Ghosts (Sk+te’kmujue’katik)	Won	
2026	Indspire Awards	Music	Himself	Won	

== Activism ==
=== Indigenous activism ===
Dutcher aims to preserve Wolastoq culture and language through his music, and inspire Indigenous youth to think about the importance of language. When asked about his decision to record in his native Wolastoq language, Dutcher stated "it’s less about asking people to learn a new language and more about disrupting the bilingual Anglo-centric Canadian music narrative. Up until this point, why have there been no popular records in my language?"

At the Juno Awards pre-telecast industry gala dinner on March 16, 2019, Dutcher used his acceptance speech to critique the Trudeau government's approach to reconciliation with Indigenous peoples. Although his remarks were interrupted partway through when he was played off the stage, later that evening Arkells gave their own speaking time to allow him to conclude his remarks. He made his first national televised performance at the Juno Awards the following night, March 17, 2019, performing “Sakomawit” from his album Wolastoqiyik Lintuwakonawa beneath black and white photographs of his Wolastoq ancestors.

=== LGBTQ+ activism ===
Dutcher was previously responsible for development coordination and Indigenous outreach at Egale Canada, which is currently the country's only national LGBT human rights organization.

The intersection of identifying as both Indigenous and two-spirited allows Dutcher to speak out on the Indigenization of queer spaces. In the Two-Spirit Roundtable project he speaks on the lack of gendered pronouns in the Maliseet language, and advocates for a "less western" way of thinking about gender.
