= List of awards and nominations received by Elliot Page =

Awards and nominations received by Elliot Page
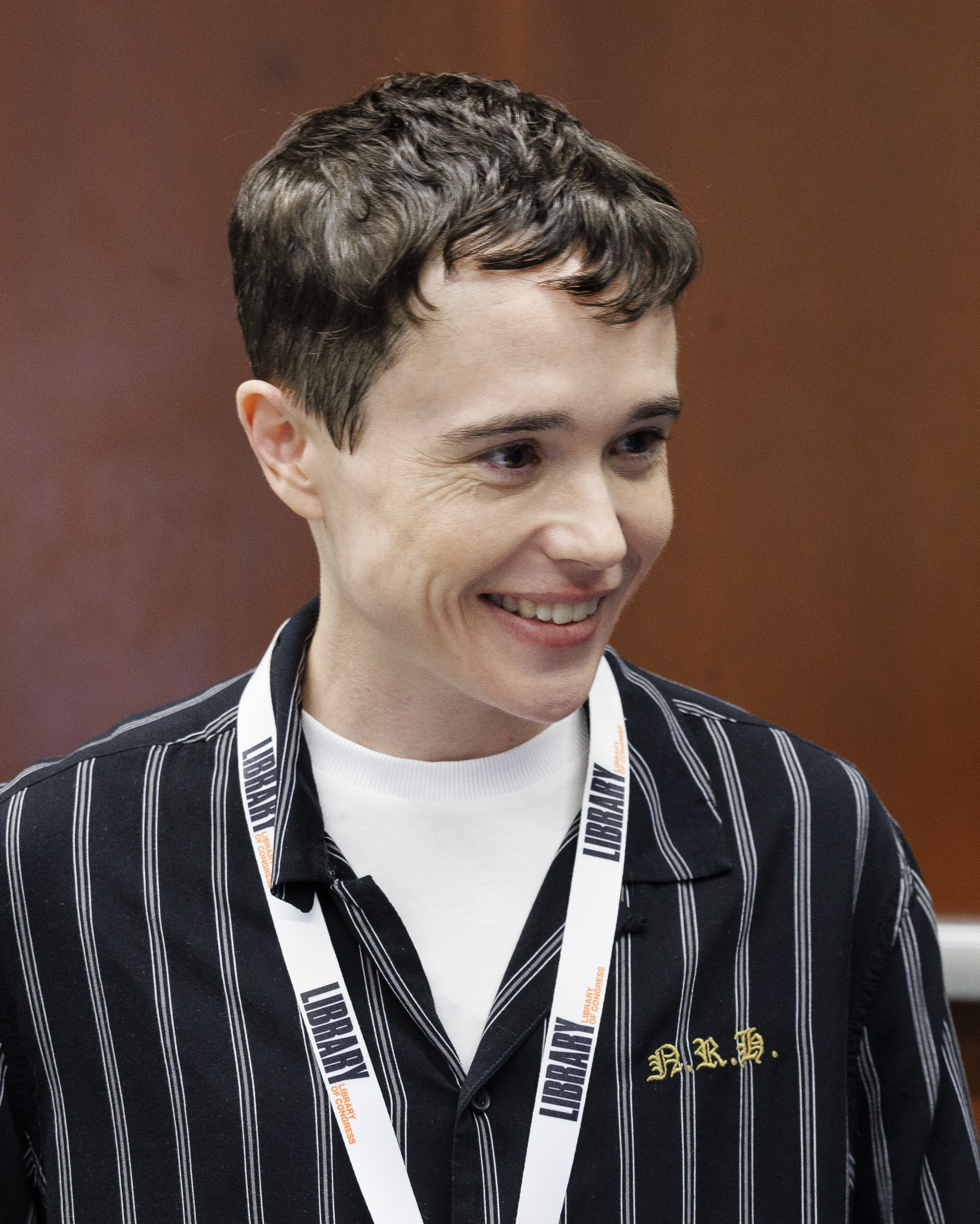
- Page in 2023
Awards and nominations
Award	Wins	Nominations
Academy Awards	0	1
Academy of Canadian Cinema & Television Awards	0	1
ACTRA Maritimes Awards	1	1
Atlantic Film Festival	2	2
Austin Film Critics Association Awards	2	2
BAFTA Awards	0	2
BAFTA Games Awards	0	1
Canadian Comedy Awards	1	1
Chicago Film Critics Association Awards	1	1
Chlotrudis Awards	0	2
Critics' Choice Movie Awards	0	1
Detroit Film Critics Society Awards	1	1
EDA Awards	1	4
Empire Awards	0	2
Fangoria Chainsaw Awards	0	2
Florida Film Critics Circle Awards	2	2
Gemini Awards	2	3
Genie Awards	0	2
Golden Globe Awards	0	1
Gotham Awards	1	1
Hollywood Film Awards	1	1
Houston Film Critics Society Awards	0	1
Independent Spirit Awards	1	1
IndieWire Critics Poll	0	1
MTV Movie & TV Awards	2	6
National Board of Review Awards	1	1
National Movie Awards	0	1
New York Film Critics Circle Awards	0	1
New York Film Critics Online Awards	1	1
Nickelodeon Kids' Choice Awards	0	1
Online Film Critics Society Awards	0	2
People's Choice Awards	0	1
Premios Maguey	1	1
Primetime Emmy Award	0	2
San Diego Film Critics Society Awards	1	1
Satellite Awards	1	1
Saturn Awards	0	3
Scream Awards	0	1
Screen Actors Guild Awards	0	1
Spike Video Game Awards	0	1
St. Louis Gateway Film Critics Association Awards	1	1
Teen Choice Awards	3	5
Toronto Film Critics Association Awards	1	1
Vancouver Film Critics Circle Awards	1	2
Washington D.C. Area Film Critics Association Awards	1	1
Women Film Critics Circle Awards	1	3
Young Artist Awards	0	1

Totals (Note: Certain award groups do not simply award one winner. They acknowledge several different recipients, have runners-up, and have third place. Since this is a specific recognition and is different from losing an award, runner-up mentions are considered wins in this award tally. For simplification and to avoid errors, each award in this list has been presumed to have had a prior nomination.)
- Wins: 31
- Nominations: 76

Elliot Page is a Canadian actor who has received 76 award nominations for roles across Canadian and American film and television, winning 31 of them. Prior to coming out as transgender in December 2020, Page was nominated in female awards categories under the name Ellen Page.

Page's first nominations were for Pit Pony (1999–2000), a Canadian children's television series about a mining town. It was an adaptation of the 1997 television film of the same name—Page's debut role at the age of 10. In 2002, he starred in the feature film Marion Bridge, describing it in 2010 as the role where he "really fell in love with acting". Page continued to receive accolades in film and television as a teenager, with credits including Ghost Cat (2003), ReGenesis (2004) and Wilby Wonderful (2004). He received multiple awards and critical acclaim for Hard Candy (2005), a low-budget thriller film in which he played the lead role of a teenage girl who tortures a pedophile.

Page received acclaim for his breakthrough performance at the age of 20 as the eponymous character Juno MacGuff in Juno (2007), an independent coming-of-age film about confronting an unplanned teenage pregnancy. For Juno, he received numerous accolades in Best Breakthrough Performance and Best Actress categories, winning three Teen Choice Awards, a Canadian Comedy Award and a Satellite Award, and earning nominations for two British Academy Film Awards (BAFTAs), an Academy Award (Oscar), a Golden Globe Award, and a Screen Actors Guild Award (SAG). At age 20, he became the fourth-youngest Academy Award Best Actress nominee at the time. Also in 2007, he starred in the drama film The Tracey Fragments.

Page received further accolades for roles including the drama film Freeheld (2015), and the superhero works X-Men: Days of Future Past (2014) and The Umbrella Academy (2019–2024). He won an MTV Movie Award for Inception (2010) with his leading role as a graduate architecture student. He garnered three award nominations for serving as a voice actor in the video game Beyond: Two Souls (2013). The television documentary series Gaycation (2016), hosted by Page and Ian Daniel, received two Primetime Emmy Award nominations.

== Major associations ==
Major awards and nominations received by Elliot Page
Award	Year	Nominated work	Category	Result	Ref.
Academy Awards	2008	Juno	Best Actress	Nominated	
British Academy Film Awards	2008	—	Rising Star Award	Nominated	
British Academy Film Awards	2008	Juno	Best Actress in a Leading Role	Nominated	
British Academy Video Games Awards	2014	Beyond: Two Souls	Best Performer	Nominated	
Critics' Choice Movie Awards	2007	Juno	Best Actress	Nominated	
Golden Globe Awards	2008	Juno	Best Actress – Motion Picture Comedy or Musical	Nominated	
Primetime Emmy Awards	2016	Gaycation	Outstanding Unstructured Reality Program (Note: Shared with Spike Jonze, Nomi Ernst Leidner, Brendan Fitzgerald, Patrick Moses, Shane Smith, Eddy Moretti, William Fairman, Niharika Desai and Alex Braverman)	Nominated	
Primetime Emmy Awards	2017	Gaycation	Outstanding Unstructured Reality Program (Note: Shared with Ian Daniel, Spike Jonze, Niharika Desai, Nomi Ernst Leidner, Bernardo Loyola, Shane Smith, Eddy Moretti)	Nominated	
Screen Actors Guild Awards	2008	Juno	Outstanding Performance by a Female Actor in a Leading Role	Nominated	

== Miscellaneous awards ==
Miscellaneous awards and nominations received by Elliot Page
Award	Year	Nominated work	Category	Result	Ref.
Academy of Canadian Cinema & Television Awards	2007	The Tracey Fragments	Best Performance by an Actress in a Leading Role	Nominated	
ACTRA Maritimes Awards	2003	Marion Bridge	Outstanding Female Performance	Won	
Atlantic Film Festival Awards	2004	Wilby Wonderful	Outstanding Performance by an Actor – Female	Won	
Atlantic Film Festival Awards	2007	The Tracey Fragments	Best Actress	Won	
Canadian Comedy Awards	2008	Juno	Best Performance by a Female – Film	Won	
Chlotrudis Awards	2007	Hard Candy	Best Actress	Nominated	
Chlotrudis Awards	2008	Juno	Best Actress	Nominated	
EDA Awards	2007	Juno	Best Breakthrough Performance	Won	
EDA Awards	2007	Juno	Best Actress	Nominated	
EDA Awards	2007	Juno	Best Seduction	Nominated	
EDA Awards	2016	Freeheld	Most Egregious Age Difference Between the Lead and the Love Interest (Note: Shared with Julianne Moore)	Nominated	
Empire Awards	2007	Hard Candy	Best Newcomer	Nominated	
Empire Awards	2009	Juno	Best Actress	Nominated	
Fangoria Chainsaw Awards	2006	Hard Candy	Relationship from Hell (Note: Shared with Patrick Wilson)	Nominated	
Fangoria Chainsaw Awards	2006	Hard Candy	Creepiest Kid	Nominated	
Gemini Awards	2000	Pit Pony	Best Performance in a Children's or Youth Program or Series	Nominated	
Gemini Awards	2003	Ghost Cat	Best Performance in a Children's or Youth Program or Series	Won	
Gemini Awards	2004	ReGenesis	Best Supporting Actress	Won	
Genie Awards	2005	Wilby Wonderful	Best Supporting Actress	Nominated	
Genie Awards	2008	The Tracey Fragments	Best Actress	Nominated	
Gotham Awards	2007	Juno	Breakthrough Actor	Won	
Hollywood Film Awards	2007	—	Breakthrough Actress of the Year	Won	
Independent Spirit Awards	2007	Juno	Best Female Lead	Won	
MTV Movie & TV Awards	2008	Juno	Best Female Performance	Won	
MTV Movie & TV Awards	2008	Juno	Best Kiss (Note: Shared with Michael Cera)	Nominated	
MTV Movie & TV Awards	2010	Inception	Best Scared-As-Shit Performance	Won	
MTV Movie & TV Awards	2010	Inception	Best Kiss (Note: Shared with Joseph Gordon-Levitt)	Nominated	
MTV Movie & TV Awards	2010	Inception	Best Jaw Dropping Moment (Note: Shared with Leonardo DiCaprio)	Nominated	
MTV Movie & TV Awards	2021	The Umbrella Academy	Best Performance in a Show	Nominated	
National Board of Review Awards	2007	Juno	Best Breakthrough Performance – Female	Won	
National Movie Awards	2008	Juno	Best Performance – Female	Nominated	
Nickelodeon Kids' Choice Awards	2015	X-Men: Days of Future Past	Favorite Female Action Star	Nominated	
People's Choice Awards	2011	Inception	Favorite On Screen Team (Note: Shared with Leonardo DiCaprio, Joseph Gordon-Levitt, Tom Hardy, Dileep Rao)	Nominated	
Premios Maguey	2018	My Days of Mercy	Best Performance	Won	
Satellite Awards	2007	Juno	Best Actress – Motion Picture Musical or Comedy	Won	
Saturn Awards	2010	Inception	Best Actress	Nominated	
Saturn Awards	2019	The Umbrella Academy	Best Supporting Actress in Streaming Presentation	Nominated	
Saturn Awards	2022	The Umbrella Academy	Best Supporting Actor in a Streaming Series	Won	
Scream Awards	2010	Inception	Best Science Fiction Actress	Nominated	
Spike Video Game Awards	2013	Beyond: Two Souls	Best Voice Actress	Nominated	
Teen Choice Awards	2008	Juno	Choice Movie Actress: Comedy	Won	
Teen Choice Awards	2008	Juno	Choice Movie: Breakout Female	Won	
Teen Choice Awards	2008	Juno	Choice Movie: Liplock (Note: Shared with Michael Cera)	Won	
Teen Choice Awards	2014	X-Men: Days of Future Past	Choice Movie: Scene Stealer	Nominated	
Teen Choice Awards	2019	The Umbrella Academy	Choice Sci-Fi/Fantasy TV Actress	Nominated	
Young Artist Awards	2002	Pit Pony	Best Performance in a TV Drama Series – Leading Young Actress	Nominated	

== Critics associations ==
Awards and nominations received by Elliot Page from critics associations
Award	Year	Nominated work	Category	Result	Ref.
Austin Film Critics Association Awards	2006	Hard Candy	Best Actress	Won	
Austin Film Critics Association Awards	2007	Juno	Best Actress	Won	
Chicago Film Critics Association Awards	2007	Juno	Best Actress	Won	
Detroit Film Critics Society Awards	2007	Juno	Best Actress	Won	
Florida Film Critics Circle Awards	2007	Juno	Best Actress	Won	
Florida Film Critics Circle Awards	2007	Juno	Pauline Kael Breakout Award	Won	
Houston Film Critics Society Awards	2007	Juno	Best Actress	Nominated	
IndieWire Critics Poll	2007	Juno	Best Performance	10th Place	
New York Film Critics Circle Awards	2007	Juno	Best Actress	Nominated	
New York Film Critics Online Awards	2007	Juno	Best Breakthrough Performance	Won	
Online Film Critics Society Awards	2006	Hard Candy	Best Breakthrough Performance	Nominated	
Online Film Critics Society Awards	2007	Juno	Best Actress	Nominated	
San Diego Film Critics Society Awards	2007	Juno	Best Actress	Runner-up	
St. Louis Gateway Film Critics Association Awards	2007	Juno	Best Actress	Won	
Toronto Film Critics Association Awards	2007	Juno	Best Actress	Won (Note: Tied with Julie Christie (for Away from Her))	
Vancouver Film Critics Circle Awards	2007	The Tracey Fragments	Best Actress in a Canadian Film	Won	
Vancouver Film Critics Circle Awards	2007	Juno	Best Actress	Nominated	
Washington D.C. Area Film Critics Association Awards	2007	Juno	Best Breakthrough Performance	Won	
Women Film Critics Circle Awards	2006	Hard Candy	Best Equality of the Sexes	Won	
Women Film Critics Circle Awards	2009	Whip It	Best Comedic Actress	Nominated	
Women Film Critics Circle Awards	2015	Freeheld	Best Screen Couple (Note: Shared with Julianne Moore)	Nominated	
