= Pit pony (disambiguation) =

A pit pony was a pony used in underground coal mines until the late 19th century.

Pit pony may also refer to:

- Pit Pony (film), a Canadian TV film
- Pit Pony (TV series), a Canadian TV series
- Pit Pony (novel), by Joyce Barkhouse
