= The Tracey Fragments =

The Tracey Fragments may refer to:

- The Tracey Fragments (novel), a novel written by Maureen Medved
- The Tracey Fragments (film), a 2007 movie directed by Bruce McDonald, based on the novel
