= Bless This Mess (U.S. Girls album) =

Studio album by U.S. Girls
- Released: February 24, 2023
- Genre: Art pop; Disco; Funk
- Length: 44:23
- Label: 4AD
- Producer: Meghan Remy; Alex Frankel; Edwin de Goeji; Georgie Gordon; Maximilian Turnbull; Rich Morel; Roger Manning Jr.

U.S. Girls chronology
Heavy Light (2020)	Bless This Mess (2023)	Scratch It (2025)

Bless This Mess is the eighth studio album by Toronto-based musician and producer Meghan Remy, under her solo project U.S. Girls. It was released on February 24, 2023, through 4AD. The album features collaborations with Michael Rault, Marker Starling and Alanna Stuart. It received generally positive reviews from critics.

== Critical reception ==
Professional ratings
Aggregate scores
Source	Rating
AnyDecentMusic?	7.2/10
Metacritic	78/100
Review scores
Source	Rating
AllMusic	4/5 stars
Clash	8/10
Exclaim!	4/5 stars
The Line of Best Fit	7/10
The Observer	3/5 stars
Pitchfork	7.8/10
PopMatters	9/10
Record Collector	4/5 stars
Slant Magazine	2/5 stars
Under the Radar	6.5/10 stars

Bless This Mess received a score of 78 out of 100 on review aggregator Metacritic based on 15 critics' reviews, indicating "generally favorable" reception. Rick Quinn of PopMatters wrote that "Remy and her collaborators have channeled her recognition of the communicative depth of dance music with creative, nearly flawless production", remarking that Remy "identif[ies] funk and R&B grooves as conduits for the very pulse of life" on Bless This Mess, also calling it "brilliantly conceived and executed". Fred Thomas of AllMusic described Bless This Mess as "another chapter of U.S. Girls' consistent evolution marked by pristine production and a deft balance of hooks and soul-baring beauty, with Remy pulling off the feat of intertwining some of her most emotionally complex material with what might be her most accessible sounds yet".

Brady Brickner-Wood, reviewing the album for Pitchfork found that it "favors retro funk and honeyed R&B, [but that] Remy recruits a diverse community of collaborators to help her explore different styles", calling it "a decidedly forward-looking album" as well as "glossier and more hi-fi than anything in Remy's catalog". Record Collector noted that the album is "pitched somewhere between personal responsibility and political accountability, Remy's return is rapturous pop music with a vision of better futures in mind. If it is a mess, it's a glorious one". Luke Winstanley of Clash opined that Bless This Mess is "at once a joyous, celebratory ode to motherhood, elsewhere finding quiet liberation and acceptance during life's darkest moments" and concluded that "Meg Remy has delivered her most hopeful album yet".

Kaelen Bell of Exclaim! wrote that Bless This Mess "feels like a rebirth; a boundless, alien take on Remy's explosive art-pop, its conceptual wildness and sonic friskiness allowing her to flex her vision and sense of humour in brand new ways". John Amen of The Line of Best Fit stated that the album "shows Remy pulling off another intriguing reinvention" as "a sense of uncomplicated buoyancy oozes from the tracks" and they are "more slickly produced, built around retro and upbeat sounds".

Phil Mongredien of The Observer described it as "a scattershot album that works best the closer it sticks to straightforward pop", noting that Remy's "more experimental material can be heavier going". Slant Magazine's Charles Lyons-Burt summarized the album as "tailor-made for our dance music-obsessed era, but while its occasionally propulsive, sonic busy-ness that was a pleasure in U.S. Girls's previous work is here coupled with thematic subject matter and genre diversions that feel ill-suited to its creator's talents". Mark Moody of Under the Radar judged it to be "considerably more focused than 2020's Heavy Light, but also foregoing the scuzzy charms of 2018's In a Poem Unlimited", which "keeps [it] from hanging together as one of Remy's best".

== Track listing ==
Bless This Mess track listing
No.	Title	Length
1.	"Only Daedalus"	3:29
2.	"Just Space for Light"	3:56
3.	"Screen Face" (featuring Michael Rault)	3:20
4.	"Futures Bet"	4:52
5.	"So Typically Now"	3:15
6.	"Bless This Mess"	4:02
7.	"Tux (Your Body Fills Me, Boo)"	6:26
8.	"R.I.P. Roy G. Biv" (featuring Marker Starling)	4:42
9.	"St. James Way"	3:43
10.	"Pump" (featuring Alanna Stuart)	3:27
11.	"Outro (The Let Down)"	3:11
Total length:		44:23
