= Half Free =

Studio album by U.S. Girls
- Released: September 25, 2015
- Genres: Art pop; electronic; experimental pop
- Length: 36:27
- Label: 4AD
- Producers: Slim Twig; Meg Remy; Onakabazien

U.S. Girls chronology
| Gem (2012) | Half Free (2015) | In a Poem Unlimited (2018) |

Half Free is the fifth studio album by U.S. Girls, the solo project of Toronto-based American musician Meghan Remy. It was released on September 25, 2015, through 4AD record label. Inspired by Sebastian Junger’s memoir War and described by its press release as "an honest and lyrically jarring exploration of emotions, drenched in a bath of raw beats and loops," the album features contributions from Remy's husband Slim Twig, producer Onakabazien, Ben Cook of Fucked Up, Amanda Crist of Ice Cream and Tony Price.

Receiving a critical acclaim upon its release, the album garnered a Juno Award nomination for Alternative Album of the Year at the Juno Awards of 2016, and was a shortlisted finalist for the 2016 Polaris Music Prize.

== Music ==
Described as an "electronic art pop record, Half Free maintains the accessibility and increased production values of the previous album, Gem (2012), while revisiting some of the tape loop experimentation and dark subject matter of U.S. Girls' older works. The album also incorporates a wide array of musical styles, including disco, reggae, glam rock, pop, outsider music, chamber music, illbient and new wave.

== Critical reception ==
Professional ratings
Aggregate scores
| Source | Rating |
|---|---|
| Metacritic | 79/100 |
Review scores
| Source | Rating |
| AllMusic | 3.5/5 stars |
| Exclaim! | 8/10 |
| NME | 4/5 |
| NOW | 4/5 stars |
| Pitchfork | 8.0/10 |
| PopMatters | 8/10 |
| Tiny Mix Tapes | 5/5 marks |

At Metacritic, which assigns a normalized rating out of 100 to reviews from critics, the album received an average score of 79, which indicates "generally favorable reviews", based on 14 reviews. AllMusic critic Paul Simpson wrote: "Overall, Half Free straddles a neat balance between bittersweet pop hooks and murky, adventurous production." Alan Ranta of Exclaim! thought that "after years of flirting with the fringes, Half Free hits the art-pop bullseye." NME's Barry Nicolson stated: "This is the unmistakeable sound of a star being born: this is an album with something to say, in a voice all of its own." Kevin Ritchie of NOW thought: "Occasionally Half Free can sound dense to the point of being vexing, but its vivid imagery and striking melodies keep Remy’s more self-indulgent tendencies grounded in a classic pop sensibility."

Pitchfork critic Stuart Berman also responded positively, writing: "Even as its backdrop mutates from deep-house throbs to psych-rock guitar solos, Half Free always focuses your attention to where it should be: on Remy's radiant voice and vivid storytelling." Mike Opal of PopMatters stated: "Chirping Half Free‘s most compelling of its many indelible hooks, she tries to convince whoever listens 'You all have nothing here / You have so much to fear'." Tiny Mix Tapes' Will Coma praised the record, writing: "Mastermind Meg Remy’s first album for the vaunted 4AD label is bursting with vivid, cracked imagination and cool mastery of slippery pop allure." Brendan Telford of The Quietus described the album as "a brilliant, accessible, edgy pop record" that was made "without compromising her ideals one iota."

== Track listing ==
1. "Sororal Feelings" – 2:55
2. "Damn That Valley" – 3:11
3. "Telephone Play No. 1" – 1:18
4. "Window Shades" – 4:42
5. "New Age Thriller" – 4:58
6. "Sed Knife" – 2:42
7. "Red Comes in Many Shades" – 5:14
8. "Navy & Cream" – 4:16
9. "Woman's Work" – 7:11
