= Maureen Medved =

Canadian writer and playwright

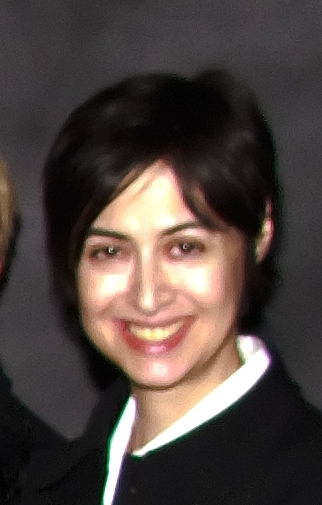
- Occupations: Author and Associate Professor of Creative Writing
- Writing career
- Language: English
- Period: Contemporary
- Notable awards: Manfred Salzgeber Prize

Maureen Medved is a Canadian writer and playwright. She is also an assistant professor at the University of British Columbia. She has been published in literary journals and magazines and has had her plays produced in Vancouver, British Columbia, Waterloo, Ontario and Toronto, Ontario. She wrote a screenplay based on her first novel The Tracey Fragments, which was made into a film of the same name directed by Bruce McDonald and starring Elliot Page.

Her 2018 novel Black Star was shortlisted for the 2019 ReLit Award for fiction and won the CAA Fred Kerner Book Award in 2019.

== Bibliography ==
- The Tracey Fragments, House of Anansi Press, 2007
- Black Star, Anvil Press, 2018
