= The Tracey Fragments (novel) =

1998 novel by Maureen Medved

- Author: Maureen Medved
- Language: English
- Publisher: House of Anansi Press
- Publication date: 1998
- ISBN: 0-88784-624-6 (first edition, paperback)
- Dewey Decimal: 813.54
- LC Class: PR9199.3.M42485 T73

The Tracey Fragments is a novel by Canadian author Maureen Medved. It was first published in 1998 at House of Anansi Press. The construction of the narrative takes place as a series of vignettes, or the titular "fragments", of scenes from a young girl's life. The novel tells a story of rage, frustration and neglect in Tracey's life, and her search for salvation in the face of tragedy.

Medved wrote the screenplay for the film adaptation, which was directed by Bruce McDonald.

== Plot ==
Tracey Berkowitz, a young Canadian teenager, has mental health issues, and as an unreliable narrator, she gradually reveals a dark family trauma involving her little brother, Sonny Berkowitz, and a boy from Tracey's school. Tracey narrates as she travels from bus to bus naked under a shower curtain, unable to return home for fear that her emotionally distant parents won't accept her back. The closest person Tracey has to a friend is Dr. Hecker, a homely psychiatrist whose ethical obligations prevent her from being emotionally invested in Tracey as a patient. Tracey also shares stories about her grandmother, a woman with the same mental afflictions as Tracey herself; Tracey's grandmother faced an apparent home invasion and sexual assault in her home in Poland.

Tracey eventually reveals a sexual encounter with "Billy Speed", the boy from her school who she likes. Tracey fantasizes about starting a metalcore band with Billy under a stage name she's invented in her head, "Estuary Palomino." She hints at the possibility that during a bad blizzard in her home city, Sonny may have wandered off and drowned in a nearby river. She suggests that her parents never wanted Sonny, noting a bizarre story her father shared with her when she was young about a female dog being killed after birthing Sonny. Unable to cope with whatever has happened, Tracey continues to wander, staying with strangers and putting her life in danger as she travels from place to place. The novel ends with Tracey still on the public city bus, remarking (of finding Sonny) "we're getting warmer."

The 2007 paperback release of The Tracey Fragments, a media tie-in to the film adaptation, contained multiple pages of full-colour screenshots of the main featured actors including Elliot Page, Julian Richings and Slim Twig.
