= In a Poem Unlimited =

Studio album by U.S. Girls
- Released: February 16, 2018
- Genres: Psychedelic pop; art pop; synthpop; indie pop; dance-pop; disco
- Length: 37:46
- Label: 4AD

U.S. Girls chronology
| Half Free (2015) | In a Poem Unlimited (2018) | Heavy Light (2020) |

Singles from In a Poem Unlimited
- 1. "Mad As Hell" Released: October 5, 2017; 2. "Velvet 4 Sale" Released: November 28, 2017; 3. "Pearly Gates" Released: January 10, 2018; 4. "Rosebud" Released: February 6, 2018

In a Poem Unlimited is an album by U.S. Girls, the solo project of Toronto-based American musician Meghan Remy. It was released on February 20, 2018 through 4AD.

== Background ==
Moving on from the still experimental previous LP "Half Free", "In A Poem Unlimited" has a much more distinct pop sound. It takes in a variety of styles, including electronic pop ("Rosebud", "Poem"), funk ("Pearly Gates") and psychedelic pop ("Velvet 4 Sale"). Its lyrical content is primarily political with a strong feminist bent, featuring songs concerning industrial pollution, rape revenge and the abuse of power. Simone Schmidt (known also as Fiver), the original songwriter who released "Rage of Plastics" in 2013, supported Remy with the arrangement for her cover of the song. Remy is backed on most of the album by "Toronto jazz-funk ensemble" The Cosmic Range, with the exception of the more synthpop oriented "Rosebud' and "Poem", which were performed with Rich Morel.

== Singles and remixes ==
Four singles were released from In A Poem Unlimited, all prior to its release. "M.A.H.", originally entitled "Mad As Hell", was issued as a digital single on October 5, 2017 and was received positively by the online music press. Kevin Lozano reviewed it for Pitchfork, calling it "an inventive anti-war song that combines outré smarts with utter catchiness", while Eugenie Johnson, writing for DIY, said that it was "a glistening vintage-pop gem where [Remy's] own voice soars across the top of a 70s disco beat and wall of sound production that’s like if the Ronettes covered ABBA".

A promo video was also released on the same date, where Remy sings the song while superimposed over a backdrop of political and war related imagery. Although it had been retitled "M.A.H." by the time it was released on the album, the song is exactly the same.

The second single, "Velvet 4 Sale", was released on November 28. A remix of the song by Tune-Yards was also released the following year, on one side of a split 7" single which also featured a U.S. Girls remix of Tune-Yards' "Coast to Coast" on the flip. It was sold exclusively on a joint tour undertaken by the two 4AD artists in autumn of 2018, though it was also released as an online digital single on October 3 of that year.

A third single, "Pearly Gates", followed on January 10, 2018. The final single from the album, "Rosebud", was issued on February 6, two weeks prior to the LP's release. Again it was received positively, with Pitchfork giving it "Best New Track" status and calling it "a yearning, powerful dance delicacy". Again, remixes of the song were done and released later on in the year, with the "Glasses Remix" and "Dominico Torti's 1985 Remix" being released digitally on the August 20 and 31, respectively.

== Reception ==
Professional ratings
Aggregate scores
| Source | Rating |
|---|---|
| AnyDecentMusic? | 8.2/10 |
| Metacritic | 87/100 |
Review scores
| Source | Rating |
| AllMusic | 4/5 stars |
| Clash | 9/10 |
| Exclaim! | 9/10 |
| The Guardian | 4/5 stars |
| NME | 4/5 stars |
| Now | 5/5 |
| Pitchfork | 8.6/10 |
| PopMatters | 8/10 |
| Q | 5/5 stars |
| Uncut | 7/10 |

In a Poem Unlimited received critical acclaim from critics upon release, and was shortlisted for the 2018 Polaris Music Prize. On Metacritic, the album holds a score of 87 out of 100 based on 22 reviews, indicating "universal acclaim". Exclaim! named the album the best pop or rock album of 2018.

The album was nominated for the Juno Award for Alternative Album of the Year at the Juno Awards of 2019.

== Track listing ==
| No. | Title | Writer(s) | Length |
|---|---|---|---|
| 1. | "Velvet 4 Sale" | Meghan Ann Uremovich | 3:44 |
| 2. | "Rage of Plastics" | Uremovich; Simone Schmidt | 4:28 |
| 3. | "M.A.H." | Uremovich; Maximilian Turnbull | 2:54 |
| 4. | "Why Do I Lose My Voice When I Have Something to Say" | Uremovich | 0:26 |
| 5. | "Rosebud" | Rich Morel; Uremovich | 3:10 |
| 6. | "Incidental Boogie" | Mark Louis Percy Roberts; Uremovich | 3:23 |
| 7. | "L-Over" | Uremovich; Turnbull | 4:06 |
| 8. | "Pearly Gates" | Roberts; Uremovich | 4:02 |
| 9. | "Poem" | Uremovich; Morel | 3:31 |
| 10. | "Traviata" | Uremovich | 0:13 |
| 11. | "Time" | Uremovich; Micah Blue Smaldone | 7:49 |
| Total length: | | | 37:46 |

== Charts ==
| Chart (2018) | Peak position |
|---|---|
| Belgian Albums (Ultratop Flanders) | 87 |
