= Scratch It =

Studio album by U.S. Girls
- Released: June 20, 2025
- Recorded: August–September 2024
- Studio: The Bomb Shelter (Nashville)
- Genres: Soft rock; Country
- Length: 38:34
- Label: 4AD
- Producer: Maximilian "Twig" Turnbull

U.S. Girls chronology
Bless This Mess (2023)	Scratch It (2025)

Singles from Scratch It
- 1. "Bookends" Released: May 6, 2025; 2. "No Fruit" Released: June 16, 2025

Scratch It is the ninth studio album by American record producer Meghan Remy, under the stage name U.S. Girls. It was released on June 20, 2025, via 4AD in LP, CD and digital formats.

Recorded in a ten-day period in Nashville, the album was preceded by Remy's 2023 release, Bless This Mess. "Bookends" was released as the lead single of the album on May 6, 2025. It was written by Remy and Edwin de Goeij, and its music video was directed by Caity Arthur. "No Fruit" followed as the second single on June 16, 2025.

== Reception ==
Professional ratings
Aggregate scores
Source	Rating
Metacritic	87/100
Review scores
Source	Rating
Beats Per Minute	82%
Clash	9/10
God Is in the TV	6/10
Mojo	4/5 stars
Pitchfork	8.0/10
PopMatters	8/10
Record Collector	4/5 stars
Uncut	9/10
Under the Radar	8/10

Luke Winstanley of Clash gave it a rating of nine and called it "another meticulously produced, frequently dazzling triumph", stating "Even more significant, however, was the decision to record straight to tape with a tightly assembled group of musicians and – by her standards, at least – limited instrumentation over the course of just 10 days."

Writing for Beats Per Minute, Tom Williams assigned the album a rating score of 82%. He noted, "It's hard to imagine a finer tribute, and with Scratch It, it's hard to imagine a finer U.S. Girls album." Le Devoir rated Scratch It three stars and commented, "Country at heart, but above all rock, folk and pop, with guitars with strings that roll up on the tip of the neck and a micro-dose of psychedelia exuding from these tender and sometimes heartbreaking compositions." New Noise's Oscar Ortega gave it a 3.5-star rating and remarked, the album "beckons an isolated feeling drawing from various forms of regret" and "despite its internal dejection, is walking towards a light, eagerly waiting to see what's on the other side."

In a 8.0-rated review for Pitchfork, Sadie Sartini Garner opined, on the album, "she's looser than ever before, letting the contradictions arise naturally rather than spelling them out. Across Scratch It, Remy's vocal tone and pitch land somewhere between the baby doll pout of Gwen Stefani and the down-home coo of Dolly Parton." PopMatters' Rick Quinn stated, "Scratch It speaks to our urges, to the surface that hides and reveals the depths of things, and to the way that looking back provides little clarity into the past, but helps us to attend to the future breaking into the present," rating it eight. Laut.de referred to it as an "interesting album that feels unique without being able to deliver on all fronts," giving it a rating of three stars.

The album received an eight-star rating from Kyle Mullin of Under the Radar, who observed that "while Scratch It lives up to its aged influences, Remy gives these nine tracks an undeniable immediacy, both with her singing and lyricism—which are eerily left of field—along with her spot-on taste in backing musicians and homage-motifs." It was also given a 75% score by Spectrum Culture, whose writer Aaron Paskin described it as "nurturing to the point of making this concession feel not only acceptable but necessary."

God Is in the TV's Matt Hobbs referred to the release as "the least memorable in U.S Girls' discography" and a "thrill-less album", stating "Nonetheless, there are plenty of intelligent insightful lyrics on show and Scratch It shows that being efficient and experimental with your methods can go hand in hand." Ben Lowes-Smith of Narc rated the album three out of five, remarking "ultimately Scratch It feels like it could have benefited from some more discipline and refinement." The French and German editions of Rolling Stone assigned the album a rating of three stars and three-point-five stars respectively, with the former calling it a "a hybrid and nevertheless coherent record" and the latter summarizing it as a "charming, soul-soaked trip to the 60s and 70s."

== Track listing ==
Scratch It track listing
No.	Title	Writer(s)	Length
1.	"Like James Said"	Meg Remy; Rich Morel; Dillon Watson	3:20
2.	"Dear Patti"	Remy; Tristen Gaspadarek	3:29
3.	"Firefly on July 4"	Alex Lukashevsky	2:36
4.	"The Clearing"	Micah Blue Smaldone	3:52
5.	"Walking Song"	Remy; Edwin De Goeij	3:47
6.	"Bookends"	Remy; De Goeij	11:51
7.	"Emptying the Jimador"	Remy; Watson; Jack Lawrence	3:17
8.	"Pay Streak"	Remy; Kim Beggs	3:49
9.	"No Fruit"	Remy; Watson	2:33
Total length:			38:34

== Personnel ==
Credits adapted from the album's liner notes.

- Meg Remy – vocals
- Dillon Watson – guitar, vocals, additional production
- Domo – drums
- Jack Lawrence – bass, synthesizer, vocals
- Tina Norwood – Rhodes, piano, Clavinet
- Jo Schornikow – organ, piano, Clavinet, synthesizers, additional production
- Charlie McCoy – harmonica
- Maximilian "Twig" Turnbull – production
- Andrija Tokic – engineering, mixing, additional production
- John Baldwin – mastering
- Mike Zimmerman – cover design
