= Badge Époque Ensemble =

Canadian musical project

Badge Époque Ensemble is a Canadian musical project led by Max Turnbull. They are most noted for their self-titled debut album, which was a longlisted nominee for the 2020 Polaris Music Prize.

In addition to Turnbull, the band includes guitarist Chris Bezant, saxophonist Karen Ng, flautist Alia O'Brien, bassist Giosuè Rosati, percussionist Ed Squires and drummer Jay Anderson, and performs both instrumental music and songs with guest vocalists such as Jennifer Castle, Dorothea Paas, James Baley and Meg Remy. Their music blends jazz, progressive rock, psychedelic rock and funk elements.

== History ==
Badge Époque Ensemble's self-titled debut album was released in 2019. They followed up in 2020 with Self-Help.

Their 2022 album Clouds of Joy was longlisted for the 2023 Polaris Music Prize.

The band's third album, Clouds of Joy, was released in 2022.
