= Wynne Neilly =

Canadian artist and photographer

- Born: 1990 (age 35–36)
- Education: Ryerson University
- Occupations: Photographer, artist
- Website: www.wynneneilly.com

Wynne Neilly (born 1990) is a Canadian artist and photographer based in Toronto, focused on photographing queer and transgender people.

== Life ==
Neilly attended the Image Arts program at Ryerson University, graduating in 2012. He began creating works of portraiture in the early 2010s. He is based in Toronto.

Neilly is queer and transmasculine. In 2018, he described his maleness as "really only based on my physical appearance", stating that "there is a lot more to me and my gender identity."

== Work ==
Neilly's work is largely focused on exploring gender and sexuality, and specifically "the queer and trans body".

In 2014, when he was 24, a photo taken by him was on the cover of Original Plumbing. The photo was part of a larger series titled Female to "Male", focused on gender transitioning and specifically on Neilly's own transition.

In 2015, Neilly was the winner of the "Flash Forward" photography competition hosted by the Magenta Foundation.

Elliot Page on the cover of Time in 2021, photographed by Wynne Neilly

Elliot Page requested that Neilly be the one to photograph him for the cover of Time in 2021 after Page's transition, because he wanted a photographer who was also transgender. When Neilly received an email from a Time photo editor, he initially thought it was fake, having believed that the COVID-19 pandemic ended his career. He photographed Page on March 5, 2021, for the March 29 – April 5 issue of Time; it was the first time a transgender man was featured on the magazine's cover. He later told Ryerson University's publication that "[it] really meant the world to me to be able to help [Page] tell his story".

Neilly has cited Catherine Opie as his "number one photographic inspiration", along with other inspirations including Cassils, Michelle Groskopf, and Robert Mapplethorpe.

== Exhibitions ==
Neilly's work has been exhibited at the International Center of Photography, The Annenberg Space for Photography, Southern Norway Art Museum, and the Ryerson Image Centre.
