= U.S. Girls =

American-Canadian experimental pop project

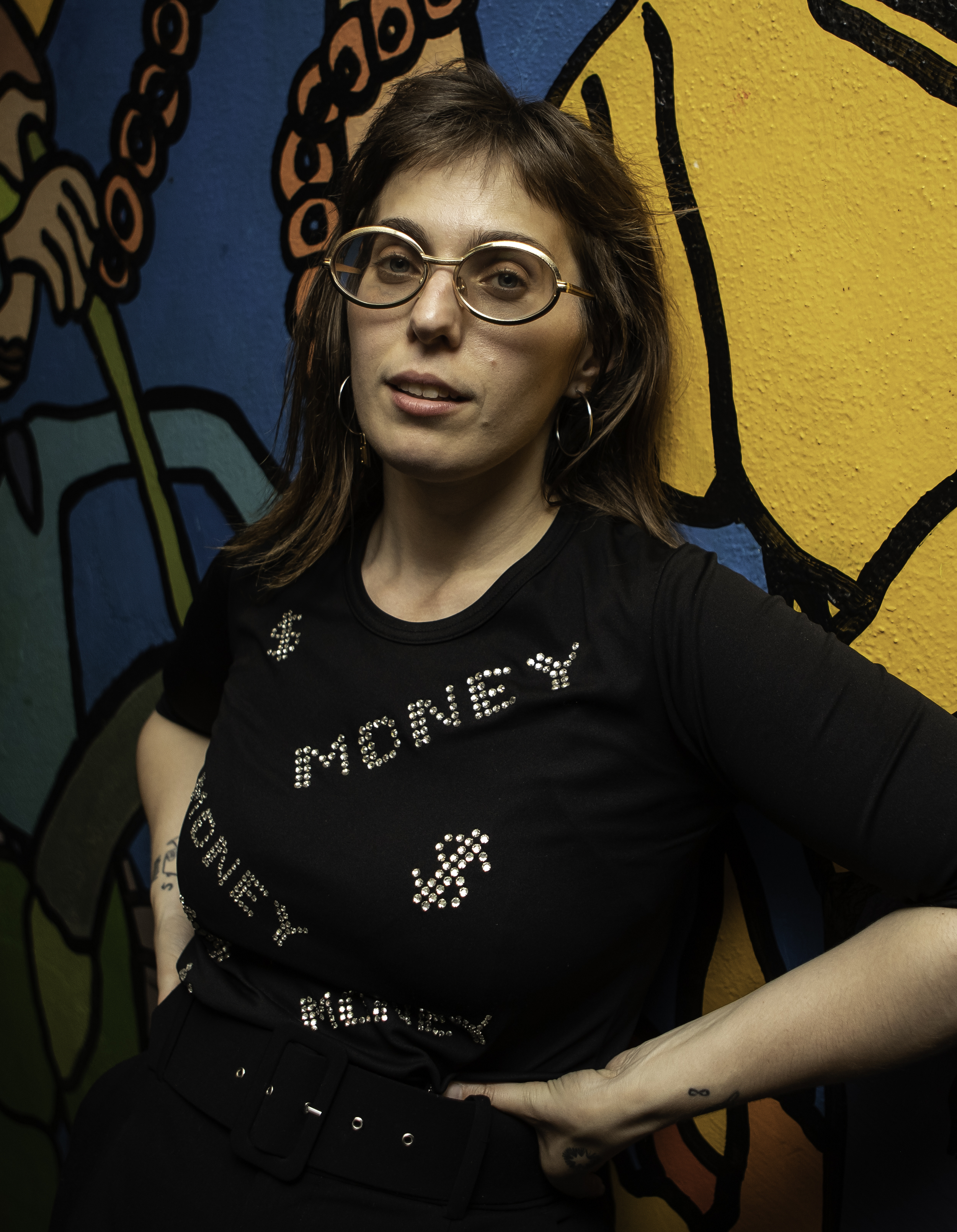
- Remy in 2019

Background information
- Born: Meghan Remy; 1985 (age 40–41); Chicago, Illinois, U.S.
- Genres: Art pop; electronic; experimental pop
- Years active: 2007–present
- Labels: Siltbreeze; FatCat; 4AD; Atelier Ciseaux; Econore; Royal Mountain
- Website: yousgirls.com

U.S. Girls is a Toronto-based experimental pop project formed in 2007, consisting solely of American musician and record producer Meghan Remy. She had released music on a variety of independent record labels before signing to 4AD in 2015.

Half Free, her first record for 4AD, was released the same year. It garnered a Juno Award nomination for Alternative Album of the Year at the Juno Awards of 2016, and was a shortlisted finalist for the 2016 Polaris Music Prize. Her next records In a Poem Unlimited (2018) and Heavy Light (2020) also received the same accolades.

Remy collaborates with a number of Toronto-based musicians on both songwriting and music production.

== Early life and education ==
Remy grew up in Illinois, raised mostly by her mother. She attended a Catholic high school, followed by an art college in Oregon, concentrating on paper arts and graphic design.

== Music career ==
Remy was in her first punk band as a teenager. She cites riot grrrl and Crass as early influences.

Remy began making music in the mid-2000s, playing in bands in Chicago and Portland. In 2008 she started recording solo at home. The name "U.S. Girls" originated from a casual conversation she was having with a friend talking about a European band coming to town. She joked, "Wait 'til they get a look at these U.S. girls!" and the phrase stuck.

After signing to 4AD in 2015, first album Half Free received critical acclaim from publications including The Quietus. She performed the album at festivals through 2016, including Primavera Sound.

In 2018, Remy's sixth studio album, In a Poem Unlimited, was released on 4AD. and was awarded Pitchfork's Best New Music accolade. She made her Coachella debut in 2019 as part of the album cycle.

2020's Heavy Light was released shortly before the pandemic, preceded by singles "4 American Dollars" and "Overtime". Her 2023 album Bless This Mess was longlisted for the 2023 Polaris Music Prize.

Alongside her husband Max "Slim Twig" Turnbull, she operates record label Calico Corp., and sometimes performs as a guest vocalist with Turnbull's Badge Époque Ensemble.

== Writing career ==
In 2021, Remy released her first book, Begin by Telling, published by Bookhug Press. CBC.ca wrote that " experimental pop sensation Meg Remy spins a web out from her body to myriad corners of American hyper-culture. Through illustrated lyric essays depicting memories from early childhood to present day, Remy paints a stark portrait of a spectacle-driven country."

== Personal life ==
Remy later moved from Chicago to Toronto in 2010 after marrying Canadian musician Turnbull. She has permanent residency status in Canada.

== Discography ==
Studio albums

- Introducing... (2008)
- Go Grey (2010)
- U.S. Girls on KRAAK (2011)
- Gem (2012)
- Half Free (2015)
- In a Poem Unlimited (2018)
- Heavy Light (2020)
- Bless This Mess (2023)
- Scratch It (2025)

Split albums

- U.S. Girls / Slim Twig (2011) (with Slim Twig)

EPs

- Kankakee Memories (2008)
- U.S. Girls/Dirty Beaches Split EP (2011)
- Free Advice Column (2013)

Live albums

- Lives (2023)

Compilations

- Early Works (2011)

=== Singles ===
List of singles, with selected chart positions
Title	Year	Peak chart positions	Album
Title	Year	US AAA	Album
"U.S. Girls Cassingle": Found on the Ground/St Jude Boys Choir	2008	—	Non-LP singles
"Me + Yoko"	2009	—	Non-LP singles
"Lunar Life"	2010	—	Non-LP singles
"Salt Road"/"Won't Bother I"	2010	—	Non-LP singles
"The Boy Is Mine" (Split single with Deep Purr)	2011	—	U.S. Girls on Kraak
"The Island Song"	2011	—	U.S. Girls on Kraak
"Jack"	2012	—	Gem
"Slim Baby"	2012	—	Gem
"Rosemary"	2012	—	Gem
"Damn That Valley"	2015	—	Half Free
"Woman's Work"	2015	—	Half Free
"Window Shades"	2015	—	Half Free
"M.A.H"	2017	—	In a Poem Unlimited
"Velvet 4 Sale"	2017	—	In a Poem Unlimited
"Pearly Gates"	2018	—	In a Poem Unlimited
"Rosebud"	2018	—	In a Poem Unlimited
"Overtime"	2020	—	Heavy Light
"4 American Dollars"	2020	33	Heavy Light
"Santa Stay Home"	2020	—	Non-album single
"Junkyard"	2021	—	Bills & Aches & Blues (various artists)
"So Typically Now"	2022	—	Bless This Mess
"Bless This Mess"	2022	—	Bless This Mess
"Futures Bet"	2023	—	Bless This Mess
"Tux"	2023	—	Bless This Mess
