= Heavy Light (U.S. Girls album) =

Studio album by U.S. Girls
- Released: March 6, 2020
- Genres: Experimental pop; Funk; Soul
- Length: 37:29
- Label: 4AD
- Producer: Meghan Remy

U.S. Girls chronology
In a Poem Unlimited (2018)	Heavy Light (2020)	Bless This Mess (2023)

Heavy Light is the seventh studio album by Toronto-based musician and producer Meghan Remy, under her solo project U.S. Girls. It was released March 6, 2020 under 4AD.

== Critical reception ==
Professional ratings
Aggregate scores
Source	Rating
AnyDecentMusic?	7.9/10
Metacritic	82/100
Review scores
Source	Rating
AllMusic	4/5 stars
Crack Magazine	8/10
Exclaim!	9/10
God Is in the TV	8/10
The Line of Best Fit	9/10
NME	3/5 stars
Paste	8.3/10
Pitchfork	8.5/10
Spectrum Culture	4.25/5
Under the Radar	8.5/10

Heavy Light was met with universal acclaim reviews from critics. At Metacritic, which assigns a weighted average rating out of 100 to reviews from mainstream publications, this release received an average score of 82, based on 16 reviews.

The album received a Juno Award nomination for Alternative Album of the Year at the Juno Awards of 2021.

=== Accolades ===
Accolades for Heavy Light
Publication	Accolade	Rank	Ref.
Paste	Paste's 25 Best Albums of 2020 – Mid-Year	11	
Pitchfork	The 50 Best Albums of 2020	15	

== Track listing ==
Heavy Light track listing
No.	Title	Writer(s)	Length
1.	"4 American Dollars"	Rich Morel; Meg Remy	5:42
2.	"Overtime"	Basia Bulat; Louis Percival; Remy	2:54
3.	"IOU"	Morel; Remy	4:42
4.	"Advice to Teenage Self"		0:50
5.	"State House (It's a Man's World)"	Remy; Maximilian Turnbull	1:43
6.	"Born to Lose"	Jack Name	3:07
7.	"And Yet It Moves/Y Se Mueve"	Morel; Remy; Kassie Richardson	3:36
8.	"The Most Hurtful Thing"		1:04
9.	"Denise, Don't Wait"	Basia Bulat; Remy; Turnbull	4:20
10.	"Woodstock '99"	Bulat; Remy; Jimmy Webb	2:36
11.	"The Color of Your Childhood Bedroom"		0:27
12.	"The Quiver to the Bomb"	Morel; Remy	4:23
13.	"Red Ford Radio"	Remy	2:05
Total length:			37:29
