= Joyce Barkhouse =

Canadian writer (1913–2012)

Joyce Barkhouse CM ONS
- Born: Joyce Carman Killam; May 3, 1913; Woodville, Nova Scotia, Canada
- Died: February 2, 2012 (aged 98); Bridgewater, Nova Scotia, Canada
- Occupation: children's book writer
- Writing career
- Genre: fiction for children
- Notable work: Pit Pony (1983)

Joyce Carman Barkhouse CM ONS (May 3, 1913 – February 2, 2012) was a Canadian children's writer best known for writing historical fiction. She is the aunt of Margaret Atwood, with whom she co-wrote the children's book Anna's Pet. Barkhouse achieved her greatest recognition for her novel Pit Pony.

== Education and family life ==
Born in Woodville, Nova Scotia, the daughter of Harold Edwin Killam, a rural family physician, and his wife, Ora Louise (née Webster), Joyce was educated in Woodville until transferring to King’s County Academy in Kentville to complete grade twelve. After receiving a Teacher's License from the Provincial Normal College in Truro in 1932, she began teaching in Sand Hill.

== Family ==
In 1939, she began teaching in Liverpool, Nova Scotia where she met Milton Joseph Barkhouse, a teller with the Royal Bank of Canada. After marrying in 1942, they had two children, Murray Roy, and Janet Louise. Barkhouse and her husband lived in Halifax, Charlottetown and Montreal, Quebec. After his death in 1968, she returned to her native Nova Scotia.

== Writing career ==
Barkhouse began writing in 1932 but did not publish her first book until 1974, George Dawson: The Little Giant, a biography of the noted scientist George Mercer Dawson. She is best known for writing the novel Pit Pony, published in 1989, which was produced as a CBC Television film in 1997, and a Gemini Award-winning television series in 1999.

== Honours ==
In 2007, she was awarded the Order of Nova Scotia. In 2008, she was made a Member of the Order of Canada for "her contributions to children’s literature and the Canadian literary community". She was an honorary life member of The Writers' Union of Canada and the Writers' Federation of Nova Scotia.

== Selected works ==
- Heroine of Lunenburg
- Smallest Rabbit, illustrated by Barbara Martin (1996)
- Yesterday's Children (1992)
- Pit Pony (1989)
- Anna's Pet with Margaret Atwood, illustrated by Ann Blades (1980)

== See also ==
- List of writers from Nova Scotia
