= Gaycation (TV series) =

2016 American television documentary series

- Also known as: Gaycation with Ellen Page
- Genre: Documentary
- Starring: Elliot Page (Note: Credited as Ellen Page); Ian Daniel
- Countries of origin: United States; Canada
- Original language: English
- No. of seasons: 2
- No. of episodes: 8 + 2 specials (list of episodes)

Production
- Executive producers: Elliot Page; Nomi Ernst Leidner; Brendan Fitzgerald; Shane Smith; Eddy Moretti; Spike Jonze; William Fairman (Note: Co-producer); Niharika Desai (Note: Supervising producer); Bradley J. Levin; Jim Czarnecki
- Producer: Allen Otto
- Production locations: United States; Japan; Brazil; Jamaica; Ukraine; India; France
- Cinematography: Niall Kenny
- Running time: 44 minutes

Original release
- Network: Viceland
- Release: March 2, 2016 – April 30, 2017

Gaycation is a 2016 American television documentary series hosted by Elliot Page and Ian Daniel. The series premiered on 2 March 2016 on Viceland as part of its new programming launch. The series explores LGBTQ cultures around the world, as Page and Daniel meet different people during their travels and hear their stories.

== Development ==
Gaycation was introduced as part of the programming launch of Vice Media's new channel, Viceland. The series was originally conceived when Spike Jonze, as the co-president of Viceland, approached Elliot Page and requested input on possible show ideas for the new channel; they suggested a travel show with an LGBT perspective. After Jonze recommended that Page be accompanied by a companion during the series, Page suggested Ian Daniel, a personal friend who was an art curator and the Director of Artistic Programs at The Civilians Theater Company, to be brought on as a co-host.

The series was renewed for a second season in 2016.

== Production ==
Filming for the first season began June 2015, in New York City. Notably, Page's attempt to interview Ted Cruz at the Iowa State Fair was recorded by bystanders and went viral; the exchange would appear in the United States episode of the series. Each of the episodes were made available for online viewing shortly after each episode's premiere.

Filming for season 2 began in March 2016. A special episode aired on August 24, 2016, focusing on the aftermath of the mass shooting that occurred at the Pulse nightclub in Orlando, Florida. The second season began airing on September 7, 2016. In January 2017, the series was nominated for a GLAAD Media Award for Outstanding Reality Program.

== Series overview ==
Season	Episodes	Season premiere	Season finale
1	4	March 2, 2016	March 23, 2016
Special		August 24, 2016	
2	4	September 7, 2016	September 28, 2016
Special		April 30, 2017	

== Episodes ==
=== Season 1 (2016) ===
No. overall	No. in season	Title	Original release date
1	1	"Japan"	March 2, 2016
In the series premiere, Elliot and Ian explore the contradictions surrounding the LGBTQ community in Japan by immersing themselves in the culture and meeting people who have struggled with the nation's ambiguous stance on homosexuality.
2	2	"Brazil"	March 9, 2016
A visit to Rio de Janeiro, Brazil, explores how Brazil's queer community manages to live in a place that has the highest LGBTQ murder rate in the world.
3	3	"Jamaica"	March 16, 2016
Elliot and Ian travel to Jamaica, a country notorious for its homophobia, and explore how the area's gay community is perceived. Featuring Beenie Man.
4	4	"United States"	March 23, 2016
Elliot and Ian go on a road trip from Iowa to New York City, during which they explore both the progress and setbacks of the LGBTQ movement in the United States. They start with a brief detour to Saskatchewan in Canada to attend a gathering of Two Spirit Native Americans. At the Iowa Republican Caucus, Elliot asks Senator Ted Cruz during live Q&A about his stance on LGBT rights. Their trip ends at the Gay Pride parade in New York City.

=== Special (2016) ===
No.	Title	Original release date
5	"Gaycation Presents: Orlando"	August 24, 2016
In a special presentation from Gaycation, Elliot Page and Ian Daniel sit down with a diverse group of individuals affected by the shooting in Orlando to discuss the aftermath of the tragic event.

=== Season 2 (2016) ===
No. overall	No. in season	Title	Original release date
6	1	"Ukraine"	September 7, 2016
In the second-season premiere, Elliot and Ian travel to Ukraine two years after the revolution and meet LGBTQ activists fighting for equality in a post-Soviet era.
7	2	"India"	September 14, 2016
Elliot and Ian travel to India, where guides from the local LGBTQ community help them explore how the country can evolve while maintaining its long-held traditions.
8	3	"France"	September 21, 2016
Ian travels to France, where he once lived as a student, to look at what it's like for LGBTQ persons whose stories and struggles are often hidden. Featuring transgender showgirl Marie-Pierre Pruvot, aka Bambi.
9	4	"Deep South"	September 28, 2016
In the second-season finale, Ian embarks on a road trip through the Deep South to explore the culture of local LGBTQ communities and the social stigmas they're forced to endure.

=== Special (2017) ===
No.	Title	Original release date
10	"Gaycation Presents: United We Stand"	April 30, 2017
In a special presentation of Gaycation, Elliot Page and Ian Daniel go beyond the headlines and take a look into what the Trump administration could mean for the LGBTQ community.

== Accolades ==
Year	Award	Category	Nominee(s)	Result	Ref.
2016	68th Primetime Emmy Awards	Outstanding Unstructured Reality Program	Elliot Page, Spike Jonze, Nomi Ernst Leidner, Brendan Fitzgerald, Patrick Moses, Shane Smith, Eddy Moretti, William Fairman, Niharika Desai, Alex Braverman	Nominated	
2017	32nd Imagen Awards	Best Informational Program	Gaycation	Won	
2017	2017 Gold Derby Awards	Reality Host	Elliot Page and Ian Daniel	Nominated	
2017	69th Primetime Emmy Awards	Outstanding Unstructured Reality Program	Elliot Page, Ian Daniel, Spike Jonze, Niharika Desai, Nomi Ernst Leidner, Bernardo Loyola, Shane Smith, Eddy Moretti	Nominated	
2017	28th GLAAD Media Awards	Outstanding Reality Program	Gaycation	Nominated	
2018	29th GLAAD Media Awards	Outstanding Reality Program	Gaycation	Nominated	
