= Pit Pony (TV series) =

- Genre: Historical drama
- Created by: Joyce Barkhouse
- Based on: Pit Pony by Joyce Barkhouse
- Starring: Alex Wrathell; Jennie Raymond; Shaun Smyth; Denny Doherty; Elliot Page (credited as Ellen Philpotts-Page); Jeremy Akerman
- Country of origin: Canada
- No. of seasons: 2
- No. of episodes: 44

Production
- Producer: Andrew Cochran
- Running time: 30 minutes

Original release
- Network: CBC
- Release: February 5, 1999 – February 4, 2000

Pit Pony is a 1999 CBC historical drama television series that tells the story of small-town life in Glace Bay, on the island of Cape Breton, Nova Scotia in 1904. The plot line revolves around the lives of the families of the men and boys who work in the coal mines.

== Plot summary ==
Set in the small Canadian mining town of Glace Bay, Nova Scotia in the early 1900s, the series revolves around the lives and work of the town's male population, virtually all of whom were employed by the local coal mine, and the trials and tribulations of the women of the town, who waited anxiously to see if their loved ones would return home safely.

In particular, the plot line focuses on the story of the MacLean family. Willie MacLean is a 12-year-old boy with a love for horses and liking to school to escape the difficult times his family has. When the series starts, Willie's father has been dead for over a year from coal consumption, and his older brother, John also died in a mine cave in. When Willie's brother was killed in a cave in and his father wounded two or three years earlier (in the Pit Pony television film), Willie was forced to fill his brother's shoes to support his older sister Nellie, and two younger sisters, Maggie and Sarah, until their father recovered. Willie found work at the mine lonely and unfriendly; as a result he forms a bond with a pit pony horse in order to make it through each day.

The principal characters included the members of the MacLean and Hall families: Alex Wrathell as young Willie MacLean, through whose eyes most of the stories unfolded around, Jennie Raymond as Willie's older sister Nellie MacLean Hall, Shaun Smyth as Nellie's Scott husband Ned Hall. Elliot Page played Maggie MacLean, and Anna Wedlock played Sarah MacLean, Willie's two younger sisters. Among the other major characters were Willie's surrogate father and stable owner Charley (Denny Doherty), town gossip Lorena MacTavish (Mary-Colin Chisholm) and the firm, but fair, mine owner Mr. Frawley (Jeremy Akerman).

== Production ==
The series followed the production of the 1997 Pit Pony television film, both of which were based on the novel Pit Pony by Joyce Barkhouse and produced by Cochran Entertainment. Mike Clattenburg, Stephen Reynolds, Phil Comeau and Peter Rowe directed the series. Seventy percent of the cast and crew were from Cape Breton and 20% were from other regions of Nova Scotia.

Stories in the series were written by Heather Conkie, Paul Ledoux, Edwina Follows and Lori Houzer. It is based on the award-winning 1997 Canadian television film inspired by Joyce Barkhouse's novel of the same name.

In June 1999, production began for the second season of Pit Pony. The series was subsequently cancelled on February 4, 2000.

== Telecast and home media ==
Pit Pony premiered on the Canadian CBC on February 5, 1999, and ended on February 4, 2000. It ran for two seasons with 44 episodes. The series aired in the U.S. on Encore, along with its multiplex channel, Starz Kids & Family. As of 2023, the series is streaming on Tubi.

== Episodes ==
=== Season 1: 1999 ===
No. overall	No. in season	Title	Directed by	Written by	Original release date
1	1	"The Light to the Future"	Unknown	Unknown	February 5, 1999
2	2	"Best Laid Plans"	Unknown	Unknown	February 12, 1999
3	3	"Forerunner"	Unknown	Unknown	February 19, 1999
4	4	"The Ball Game"	Unknown	Unknown	February 26, 1999
5	5	"To Have and to Hold"	Unknown	Unknown	March 5, 1999
6	6	"Endings and Beginnings"	Unknown	Unknown	March 12, 1999
7	7	"The Phantom Ship"	Unknown	Unknown	March 19, 1999
8	8	"The Mine's Mark"	Unknown	Unknown	March 26, 1999
9	9	"Sleeping Dogs Lie"	Unknown	Unknown	April 2, 1999
10	10	"Calling Mr. Bell"	Unknown	Unknown	April 9, 1999
11	11	"Ghost in the Lens"	Unknown	Unknown	April 16, 1999
12	12	"Famous"	Unknown	Unknown	April 23, 1999
13	13	"Winds of Change"	Unknown	Unknown	April 30, 1999
14	14	"Reunion"	Unknown	Unknown	May 7, 1999
15	15	"Making Their Way"	Unknown	Unknown	May 14, 1999
16	16	"Where There's a Will"	Unknown	Unknown	May 21, 1999
17	17	"Evolution"	Unknown	Unknown	May 28, 1999
18	18	"The Truth About Heroes"	Unknown	Unknown	June 4, 1999
19	19	"Night Into Day"	Unknown	Unknown	June 11, 1999
20	20	"Transformations"	Unknown	Unknown	June 18, 1999
21	21	"Connections"	Unknown	Unknown	June 25, 1999
22	22	"Homecoming"	Unknown	Unknown	July 2, 1999
23	23	"Charley's Secret"	Unknown	Unknown	July 9, 1999
24	24	"Sunshine and Shadows"	Unknown	Unknown	July 16, 1999
25	25	"Into the Dark"	Unknown	Unknown	July 23, 1999
26	26	"Our Sons and Daughters"	Stephen Reynolds	Heather Conkie	July 30, 1999

=== Season 2: 1999–2000 ===
No. overall	No. in season	Title	Directed by	Written by	Original release date
27	1	"Power Plays"	Unknown	Unknown	September 24, 1999
28	2	"Two Sides of the Coin"	Unknown	Unknown	October 1, 1999
29	3	"Coal Dust"	Unknown	Unknown	October 8, 1999
30	4	"A Weighty Matter"	Unknown	Unknown	October 15, 1999
31	5	"Gone Fishin'"	Unknown	Unknown	October 22, 1999
32	6	"Home"	Unknown	Unknown	October 29, 1999
33	7	"Company Business"	Unknown	Unknown	November 5, 1999
34	8	"The Game"	Unknown	Unknown	November 12, 1999
35	9	"Taking Chances"	Unknown	Unknown	November 19, 1999
36	10	"In Harmony"	Unknown	Unknown	November 26, 1999
37	11	"Sarah's Return"	Unknown	Unknown	December 3, 1999
38	12	"That Special Spark"	Unknown	Unknown	December 10, 1999
39	13	"Lost"	Unknown	Unknown	December 17, 1999
40	14	"Fiddler's Fall"	Unknown	Unknown	January 7, 2000
41	15	"Chasing Shadows"	Unknown	Unknown	January 14, 2000
42	16	"Price of Change"	Unknown	Unknown	January 21, 2000
43	17	"Small Steps"	Unknown	Unknown	January 28, 2000
44	18	"Securities"	Unknown	Unknown	February 4, 2000

== Awards and nominations ==
=== Gemini Awards ===
Year	Category	Nominee	Result	Ref
1999	Best Production Design or Art Direction in a Dramatic Program or Series	Graeme Morphy, Alan MacLeod	Nominated	
2000	Best Performance in a Children's or Youth Program or Series	Elliot Page (nominated as Ellen Philpotts Page)	Nominated	
