= Pit Pony (film) =

- Directed by: Eric Till
- Written by: Heather Conkie, based on the book by Joyce Barkhouse
- Produced by: Andrew Cochran
- Starring: Ben Rose-Davis; Richard Donat; Jennie Raymond; Andrew Keilty; Elliot Page (Note: Credited as Ellen Philpotts-Page.); Denny Doherty
- Cinematography: Nikos Evdemon
- Edited by: T. C. Martin
- Music by: Jonathan Goldsmith
- Production company: Cochran Entertainment Inc.
- Distributed by: RTL Entertainment (Netherlands, TV)
- Release date: December 14, 1997
- Running time: 92 mins.
- Country: Canada
- Language: English
- Budget: unknown

Pit Pony is a 1997 television film directed by Eric Till. It was Elliot Page's debut role; Page was scouted for it by John Dunsworth, who also had a small role in the film. The film was based on the novel Pit Pony by Joyce Barkhouse. It was nominated for numerous Gemini Awards in 1997.

== Cast ==
- Ben Rose-Davis as Willie MacLean
- Richard Donat as Rory MacLean
- Jennie Raymond as Nellie MacLean
- Andrew Keilty as John MacLean
- Elliot Page as Maggie MacLean
- Denny Doherty as Charley McGinnis

== Awards and nominations ==
=== Gemini Awards ===
Year	Category	Nominee	Result	Ref
1998	Best Costume Design	Jeanie Kimber	Nominated	
1998	Best Direction in a Dramatic Program or Mini-Series	Eric Till	Nominated	
1998	Best Original Music Score for a Program or Mini-Series	Jonathan Goldsmith	Won	
1998	Best Performance by an Actor in a Featured Supporting Role in a Dramatic Program or Mini-Series	Denny Doherty	Nominated	
1998	Best Photography in a Dramatic Program or Series	Nikos Evdemon	Nominated	
1998	Best Production Design or Art Direction in a Dramatic Program or Series	Marian Wihak	Won	
1998	Best TV Movie or Mini-Series	Andrew Cochran	Nominated	
1998	Best Writing in a Dramatic Program or Mini-series	Heather Conkie	Won	
