= Ghost Cat =

2003 Canadian television film

- DVD cover
- Based on: Ghost Cat by Beverly Butler
- Screenplay by: Larry Ketron; Heather Conkie
- Story by: Larry Ketron
- Directed by: Don McBrearty
- Starring: Evan Monk; Jacob Kerl; Michael Ontkean; Elliot Page; Lori Hallier; Shirley Knight; Shawn Roberts; Mark Rendall; Tom Barnett; Nigel Bennett
- Music by: Robert Carli
- Country of origin: Canada
- Original language: English

Production
- Producers: Orly Adelson; Christina Jennings; Jan Peter Meyboom
- Cinematography: David Perrault
- Editor: Ralph Brunjes
- Running time: 92 minutes
- Production companies: Cellar Door Productions; Whizbang Films

Original release
- Release: October 26, 2003

Ghost Cat (also known as Mrs. Ashboro's Cat and The Cat That Came Back) is a 2003 Canadian supernatural drama television film starring Elliot Page and Nigel Bennett. It was directed by Don McBrearty and written by Larry Ketron. The film is based on the novel by Beverly Butler. The film is rated PG for "mild thematic elements and some peril".

== Plot ==
A widower (Ontkean) and his teen daughter (Page) move into a house that was once owned by the friendly Mrs. Ashboro and her pet cat, Margaret. Strange things begin happening, and it soon becomes clear that the ghost of Mrs. Ashboro's cat Margaret, who died on the same day as its owner, is haunting the house.

== Cast ==
- Michael Ontkean as Wes Merritt
- Elliot Page as Natalie Merritt (Note: Credited as Ellen Page; Page came out as transgender and changed his name in 2020.)
- Lori Hallier as Brenda Yancy
- Shirley Knight as Mrs. Ruth Ashboro
- Shawn Roberts as Kurt Shawn
- Mark Rendall as Pearson Shawn
- Tom Barnett as Boyd Ashboro
- Nigel Bennett as Ted Riker
- Kelti MacMillan as Jan
- Wade Lynch as Terry
- Pam Stevenson as Sandra
- Evan Monk as Uncle Tom
- Jacob Kerl as Franny
- Baretta as Margaret
- Harley as Comfort

== Reception ==
At the time of its airing, critic Gail Pennington wrote, "Ghost Cat is no Mystic River, but it's sweet and suitable for the whole family."

=== Awards ===
Elliot Page won the Gemini Award for Best Performance in a Children's or Youth Program or Series for his role.
