= Wilby Wonderful =

- Theatrical release poster
- Directed by: Daniel MacIvor
- Written by: Daniel MacIvor
- Produced by: Camelia Frieberg
- Starring: James Allodi; Maury Chaykin; Paul Gross; Rebecca Jenkins; Sandra Oh; Elliot Page; Callum Keith Rennie; Daniel MacIvor
- Cinematography: Rudolf Blahacek
- Edited by: Mike Munn
- Music by: Michael Timmins
- Distributed by: Mongrel Media
- Release date: 2004
- Running time: 99 minutes
- Country: Canada
- Language: English

Wilby Wonderful is a 2004 comedy-drama film directed by Daniel MacIvor, and starring James Allodi, Maury Chaykin, Paul Gross, Rebecca Jenkins, Sandra Oh, Elliot Page, Callum Keith Rennie, and Daniel MacIvor. Wilby Wonderful tells the story about 24 hours in the life of the small town of Wilby, where the municipal festival is in preparation. It focuses on the changes occurring in the lives of several different inhabitants as development comes to the island and threatens to change the world around them. The title comes from a sign created to promote the town; comically, it has been painted wrong, and says "Wilby Wonderful", as opposed to "Wonderful Wilby".

Wilby Wonderful received a 71% rating from review aggregator website Rotten Tomatoes, based on 7 reviews.

== Plot ==
In the small Canadian Maritimes island town of Wilby, Dan Jarvis (James Allodi), the town's video store owner, is preparing to kill himself by jumping off a bridge; however, the presence of the town's lovable handyman, Walter "Duck" MacDonald (Callum Keith Rennie), stops him from doing so. Dan's next three suicide attempts all kept getting interrupted. His next attempt is to drown himself by stuffing rocks in his pocket at the shore of Wilby Watch, a large undeveloped area on the island, but is forced to leave when local reporters were there, interviewing local police Stan Lastman (Daniel MacIvor) about a police raid at the Wilby Watch. The local newspaper is planning to publish the names of the men caught during the raid.

Dan then tries to give himself carbon monoxide poisoning by stuffing his head into a turned-on oven, but this was also interrupted, this time by Carol French (Sandra Oh), the realtor trying to sell the house. Finally, Dan prepares to hang himself but is forced to stop when he is caught by Jennie (Devon Chisolm), the maid of the motel he was staying. Elsewhere, Buddy (Paul Gross), Carol's husband and Stan's police partner, struggles with discussing his marriage to Carol, and his ongoing affair with Sandra Anderson (Rebecca Jenkins), who is infamous in the town for her reputation as a promiscuous woman.

Sandra's teenage daughter, Emily (Elliot Page), quietly observes her mother's behavior, while hoping for a serious romance for herself, different from her mother's history, although she is dating Taylor (Caleb Langille), a boy whose intentions are a bit more basic than the romance Emily hopes for. Emily's no-nonsense and frank best friend, Mackenzie Fisher (Marcella Grimaux) is the daughter of the town's mayor, Brent (Maury Chaykin), who is considering buying Buddy's mother's house (that Carol is selling). While at lunch with Carol's assistant Deena (Kathryn MacLellan), Sandra encounters a woman whose son she went out with in high school (at the same time that he was dating someone else).

Duck has been trying to get hold of Dan's location all day, by visiting places he might be around, although it's not clear the nature of his intentions are. Dan himself finds that his estranged wife, Belle, has thrown out all of his possessions out of their once-shared home. Carol realizes the city's big banner on the bridge is written as "Wilby Wonderful" instead of the other way around, and after talking to Deena, confronts Duck about the mistake (several characters later hypothesize that Duck is dyslexic), but then Carol rambles on about her failing marriage. Buddy and Stan are investigating Wilby Watch when Stan finds five syringes; Buddy is skeptical about Stan's claim that the syringes must have been left there by drug addicts. Sandra brings Dan coffee he tried to purchase from her diner (which he left after a homophobic encounter) but she failed to crack through his walls.

Sandra then goes to see Buddy and calls him affectionately, unaware that Duck is nearby, and ultimately, both decides to end the affair. Sandra, drunk, tries to force Emily to bring a condom with her on her date with Taylor that night, but Emily refuses, calling Sandra out for her promiscuous ways and vows to have a different romance life on her own. Buddy and Carol host Mayor Brent's family who visit their house, and Mackenzie revealed to Buddy that her father has been trying to play up the scandal and turn the Wilby Watch into a golf course. Sandra leaves the pack early to prepare Buddy's mother's house for the mayor's visit, and Buddy leaves soon after, returning to inspect the Wilby Watch.

Duck, who waited well into the night in front of the motel Dan is staying, is finally able to meet up and talk to him. Duck sets the tone of their conversation to be more and more intimate as it goes, and Dan, who is distant at first, opens up to him, eventually telling Duck his favorite genre of movie. Duck goes to kiss him, but Dan backs out. As Duck leaves, he notices that Emily and Taylor, who are on the same motel in a nearby room, are having a fight over him persistently trying to have sex with her. Duck shoos Taylor away, and calms a breaking down Emily. The two of them talk in Duck's truck, and then witness Dan leaving the area. Emily asks Duck if he wants to say hi to Dan, but Duck says he already tried that.

Dan, trying his luck on killing himself one more time, sneaks into Buddy's mother's house and prepares to hang himself from the ceiling. However, he visibly has a change of heart halfway through, and smiles at the thought of Duck almost kissing him. However, as Dan tries to undone the rope around his neck, the chair he's standing on gives away, hanging him. Carol arrives at the house to prepare for the Mayor's family arrival at that moment, and after cutting the rope off, instead hides Dan's body under the stairs cupboard, hoping to hide him long enough until the Mayor and his family leaves. Mackenzie ends up finding Dan's body, and ambulance is called. At the Wilby Watch, Buddy finds that Stan is planting used insulin syringes as evidence.

The next day, Sandra and Emily forgive each other for their previous drunken encounter. Buddy forces Mayor Brent to abandon his plans to turn the Wilby Watch into a golf course, and then takes steps towards mending his relationship with Carol. Duck brings flowers for Dan, who survived his suicide, at the hospital, and the movie ends with both men tenderly caressing each other.

== Cast ==
- James Allodi as Dan Jarvis
- Maury Chaykin as Mayor Brent Fisher
- Paul Gross as Buddy French
- Rebecca Jenkins as Sandra Anderson
- Sandra Oh as Carol French
- Elliot Page as Emily Anderson (Note: Credited as Ellen Page; Page came out as transgender and changed his name in 2020.)
- Callum Keith Rennie as Duck MacDonald
- Daniel MacIvor as Stan Lastman

== Filming ==
Wilby Wonderful was filmed from 21 July to 25 August 2003 in Shelburne, Nova Scotia. It was largely shot at a decommissioned Canadian Forces station, dubbed "Camp Wilby" by cast and crew. While Wilby is never explicitly located in the film, Daniel MacIvor has acknowledged its similarities to his birthplace of Cape Breton.

The original title was Honey, and the town was named after that, but when a movie of the same name came out, Daniel MacIvor decided for Wilby instead, as a reference to hope and to the future.

== Soundtrack ==
Give me the chance to fall and Statement, performed by Gentleman Reg
All about you, performed by Young Ideas
What went wrong and Save me too, performed by Scott B. Sympathy
Shoelace easy, performed by Stratochief
Strangest dream, performed and written by Kate Maki
Something's coming performed and written by Rebecca Jenkins
Measure me, performed by Nathan
A lighthearted lovesong, performed by The Pets
Find another fool, performed by The Swiftys
Tempest, Piano Sonata No. 17 in D Major, Op. 31, No. 2, performed by Ethella Chuprik
Whatever will be, performed by Fiona Highet, Andrew Scott, and Patrick Pentland

== Awards ==
Elliot Page won an Atlantic Canadian Award in 2004 at the Atlantic Film Festival for Outstanding Performance by an Actor - Female. Rebecca Jenkins won a Vancouver Film Critics Circle Award in 2004 for Best Supporting Actress - Canadian Film.

The film was nominated in 2005 for two Genie Awards: Rebecca Jenkins's "Something's Coming" for Best Achievement in Music - Original Song, and Elliot Page for Best Performance by an Actress in a Supporting Role.

== See also ==
- List of artistic depictions of dyslexia
