= Slim Twig =

Canadian singer (born 1988)

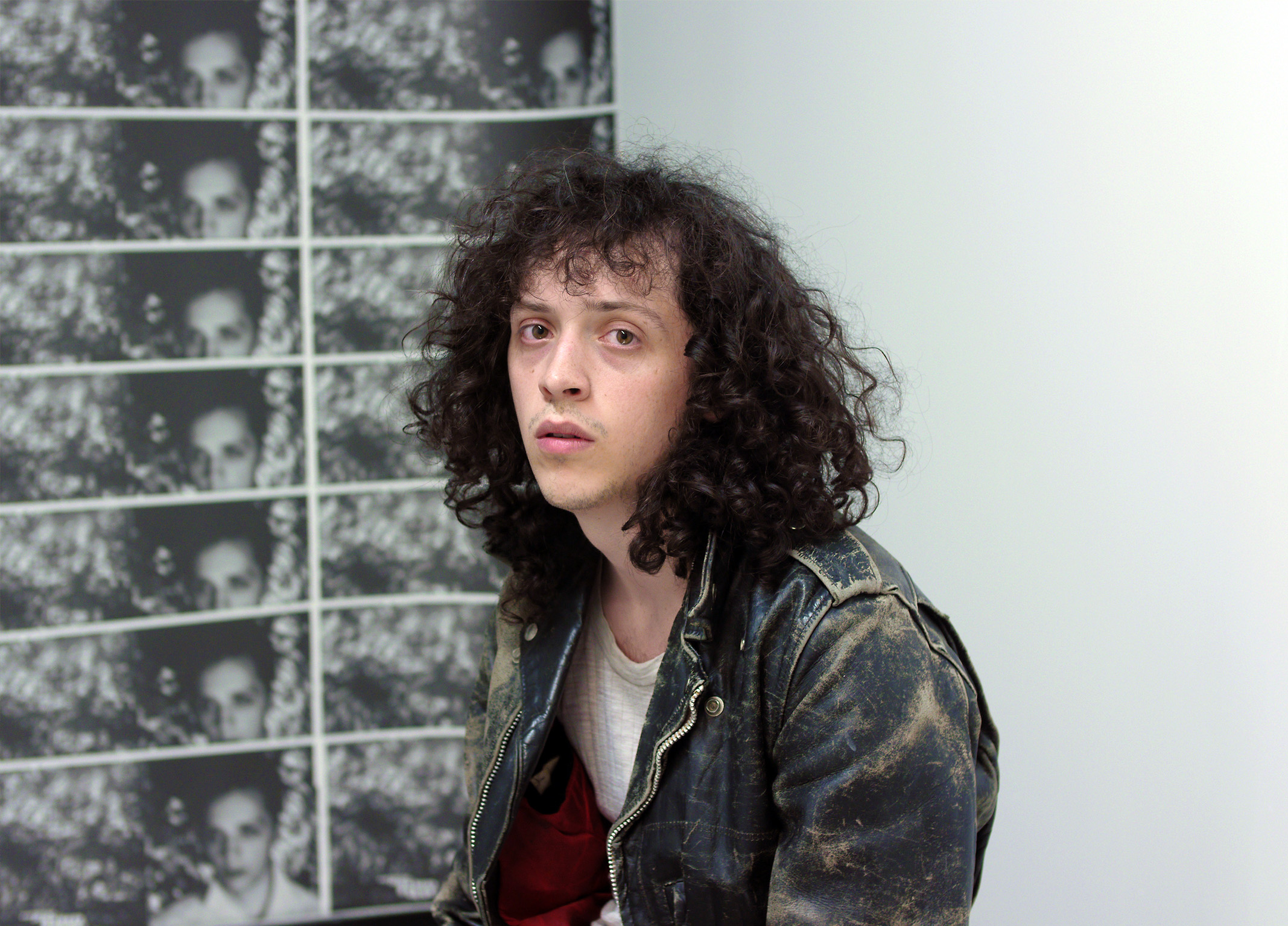
- Slim Twig in April 2014

Background information
- Born: Max Turnbull; 1988 (age 37–38); Toronto, Ontario, Canada
- Genres: Indie rock; neo-psychedelia; art rock
- Years active: 2005–present
- Labels: DFA; Paper Bag; Palmist; Calico Corp.; Pleasence
- Website: Slim Twig.com

Max Turnbull (born in 1988), better known by his stage name Slim Twig, is a Canadian songwriter, musician, and film actor, who has performed both as a solo artist and as the leader of Badge Époque Ensemble.

He was born the son of Toronto-based filmmakers Ross Turnbull and Jennifer Hazel, and graduated from the Claude Watson School of the Arts in 2006.

Twig began self-releasing music in 2005 and eventually earned a deal with Paper Bag Records. His first album under the label was Contempt!, released in 2009. He also worked in the film industry, playing "Billy Zero" in the 2007 film The Tracey Fragments. Other films he has appeared in are Dog Pound and Sight Unseen, in which he played the film's lead character.

Twig co-founded the Calico Corp. record label alongside American-Canadian U.S. Girls. Twig's second album under Paper Bag, Sof' Sike, was released in August 2012. His third studio album, A Hound at the Hem, was released under Calico Corp. three months later. This album was eventually re-released by DFA Records, who signed Twig in 2014. In 2015, he released a cover version of Serge Gainsbourg's "Cannabis" as well as his fourth studio album, Thank You for Stickin' with Twig, both under DFA Records.

He is married to Meghan Remy of U.S. Girls as of 2010, and they operate record label Calico Corp. together.

== Film work ==
Slim Twig played 'Billy Zero' in the 2007 film, The Tracey Fragments, directed by Bruce McDonald and starring Elliot Page. Slim was cast as 'Max' in French director Kim Chapiron's film, Dog Pound, set in a juvenile detention centre, and plays the lead character in an independent feature film produced by his parents entitled Sight Unseen, for which he also composed the score. He has acted in numerous commercial productions and shorts, and scored other films. In 2013, he composed the score for the documentary We Come as Friends, directed by Hubert Sauper.

== Music ==
Paper Bag Records has released two Slim Twig EPs and two full-length albums. His most recent LP, A Hound at the Hem, was released by his own label, Calico Corp., in conjunction with Pleasence Records. In September 2014, New York–based DFA Records announced that it is re-releasing A Hound at the Hem.

In addition to Slim Twig-branded music, the artist played guitar and sang in the band, Tropics, with Simone TB on drums. In a review of his early Slim Twig EPs, Pitchfork Media stated that Tropics' music is “a feral take on the Birthday Party's blitzkrieg blues.” Tropics is now defunct, having added members and transformed into Darlene Shrugg. Slim Twig has also formerly pursued a solo project called Archaic Women and played as part of a “psychedelic cover band” called Plastic Factory. In 2009, Tropics released a cassette tape entitled SETTE.

The earliest Slim Twig recordings were self-released in 2005 on a CD entitled Livestock Burn, and an EP, Dissonant Folk. Derelict Dialect was the first Slim Twig EP release from Paper Bag Records, in April, 2008. Prior to that, Slim Twig self-released an EP called Whiite Fantaseee. The songs from that recording (save one) were subsequently re-mastered and issued as Vernacular Violence by Paper Bag Records, in August, 2008. Paper Bag later released its two Slim Twig EPs as a limited edition, vinyl LP album.

In 2009, Paper Bag Records released Contempt!, Slim Twig's first, full-length LP. He states that he created the record largely from found sound and samples set against his own vocals. A Now magazine review of the album called it “startlingly unique.” Coinciding with the release of Contempt!, Slim created a free, downloadable “mixtape” EP entitled Spit It Twig! (Vol. 1). Spit it Twig! Vol 2 was issued in the fall of 2009. It was named one of the top downloads of the year by Toronto's alternative weekly magazines. The third release in the mixtape series is A Sheik in Scores, issued on cassette and as a download.

=== Recent work ===
In 2011, Slim Twig professed to a change of direction, stating in an interview with Now magazine that he is "reinventing himself as a 60s pop craftsman." His first foray in this direction was a split recording with U.S. Girls, whose side he co-produced, on FatCat subsidiary label, Palmist Records. The release was well received. Slim Twig also produced the two most recent U.S. Girls LPs, U.S. Girls on Kraak and Gem.

Slim Twig and U.S. Girls jointly created their own label, Calico Corp., and each artist issued a 7" single as the label's first productions. In addition to co-releasing A Hound at the Hem, Calico Corp. released an EP, Flushing Meats, by Eric Copeland, and most recently, Zacht Automaat, a double LP by the eponymously named Toronto duo.

In August 2012, Paper Bag released their second Slim Twig LP, Sof' Sike, which garnered positive reviews. Calico Corp. and Pleasence Records then issued A Hound at the Hem, in November, although it was apparently completed prior to Sof' Sike. While cited as "a pop record that completely forgets it's a pop record.", A Hound at the Hem has elsewhere been effusively praised as "a new masterpiece...one of the best post-glam concept albums not made in the slippery 70s”, and cited as critic Alan Ranta's choice for Canada's prestigious Polaris prize. The same writer, in reviewing the album subsequent to DFA's re-release, stated that "Canada dropped the ball, failing to recognize the genius in its own backyard."

On April 20, 2015, Slim Twig released a cover version of the Serge Gainsbourg track "Cannabis", in celebration of 4/20. The cover was released by DFA Records as a limited edition 7" vinyl. A music video for the cover was released exactly one year later. In addition to re-releasing A Hound at the Hem, DFA released Slim Twig's follow-up album, Thank You for Stickin' with Twig, on August 7, 2015.

== Critical reception ==
Slim Twig has received considerable, occasionally polarized press coverage (in print and on the internet), with much of it recognizing his unusual adventurousness and artistry. In 2008, the artist was called “an icon-in-the-making” and named Toronto's Best Pop/Rock Artist of the year by Now magazine. In a review of the track "Gate Hearing," Exclaim.ca described him as evoking "Jon Spencer's rockabilly punk chic and Genesis P. Orridge's extreme mixed-media weirdness." In a concert review, music columnist Sarah Liss suggested that Slim Twig's music sounds like “what might happen if you left a bunch of Elvis Presley LPs on a radiator, smashed them to bits with a hammer and re-assembled them for play on a turntable. In a word, otherworldly.” He has on more than one occasion, and in a positive context, been called a "pop weirdo". Of his music, one site suggests that "It isn't possible to get more post-modern pop."

Slim Twig's early interest in experimentation appeared to challenge critics looking to situate him in a pop music context. One writer found the songs on Contempt! "like the oddly appropriate soundtracks to confounding four dimensional art installations." Critics also have suggested the influence of cinema on Slim Twig, with one remarking on “is compulsive soliloquist's flair, a direct but static-filled line into a collective cinematic unconscious.” Indeed, in speaking about his creative approach, the artist cited his admiration for David Lynch's work.

== Discography ==
All records released as Slim Twig, unless noted otherwise.

- Livestock Burn (self-released: 2005)
- Dissonant Folk EP (Aphonia Recordings: 2006)
- Quilibrate split EP with Huckleberry Friends (self-released: 2006)
- Whiite Fantaseee EP (self-released: 2007)
- Derelict Dialect EP (Paper Bag Records: 2008)
- Vernacular Violence EP (Paper Bag Records: 2008)
- Derelict Dialect/Vernacular Violence LP (limited edition vinyl) (Paper Bag Records: 2008)
- Contempt! LP (Paper Bag Records: 2009)
- Spit It Twig! (Vol.1) EP (digital download: show-released free CD, 2009)
- Slim Twig Toronto/ Le Corbeau Oslo (7" vinyl split, Best of Both Records, 2009)
- Spit It Twig! (Vol. 2) EP (digital download: show-released free CD, 2009)
- Tropics – Sette (limited edition cassette tape/ digital download, Popsick Records, 2009)
- Archaic Women – The Hit Sixties (limited-edition cassette tape/ digital download, self-released, 2009)
- A Sheik in Scores (Spit It Twig! (Vol. 3)) (limited-edition cassette tape/ digital download, self-released, 2010)
- Tropics – Pale Trash (7" vinyl, Pleasence Records, 2011)
- Bloodstains Across Ontario (7" vinyl compilation, including one song each by Slim Twig and Tropics, Mammoth Cave Recordings, 2011)
- U.S. Girls/ Slim Twig (12" vinyl split, Palmist Records, 2011)
- There's a Secret to Your Pleasure (7" single, Calico Corp., 2011)
- Sof' Sike LP (Paper Bag Records: 2012)
- Statement (12" vinyl split with U.S. Girls, Dirty Beaches, Ela Orleans, Clan Destine Records, 2012)
- A Hound at the Hem LP (Calico Corp./ Pleasence Records, 2012; re-released by DFA Records, 2014)
- Thank You for Stickin' with Twig LP (DFA Records, 2015)
- Badge Époque Ensemble - Badge Époque Ensemble (2019)
- Badge Époque Ensemble - Self Help (2020)
- Badge Epoque - Scroll (2021)
- Badge Époque Ensemble - Clouds of Joy (2022)

== Videos ==
Slim Twig:

- "Cannabis" – 2016, dir. Alex Kingsmill
- "Maintain the Charade" – 2014, director (dir.) Meg Remy
- "All This Wanting" – 2012, dir. Emily Pelstring
- "Altered Ego" – 2012, dir. George Fok
- "Gun Shy" – 2012, dir. Slim Twig
- "Notorious Bride (A Veil & A Vice)" – 2011, dir. Jennifer Hazel
- "I'll Always be a Child" – 2011, dir. Mitch Fillion
- "Priscilla" – 2011, dir. Jennifer Hazel
- "Mansion Haunting" – 2010, dir. David Rendall
- "Street Proposition" – 2008, dir. Ross Turnbull
- "Birthing & Birthing" – 2008, dir. Dona Arbabzadeh
- "Gate Hearing!" – 2007, film/video collaboration with Exploding Motorcar Collective
- "Where the Dead Are Glorious" – 2008, dir. David Rendall
- "A Black Hole Is Quite a Lot" – 2006, dir. Dona Arbabzadeh & Slim Twig

Tropics:

- Enuff – 2007, dir. Ross Turnbull, edited from footage from The Tracey Fragments
