= The Tracey Fragments (film) =

2007 film by Bruce McDonald

- Directed by: Bruce McDonald
- Written by: Maureen Medved
- Based on: The Tracey Fragments by Maureen Medved
- Produced by: Sarah Timmins
- Starring: Elliot Page (Note: Credited as Ellen Page. The Tracey Fragments was released before Page came out as transgender.); Ari Cohen; Maxwell McCabe-Lokos; Erin McMurtry; Slim Twig; Julian Richings
- Cinematography: Steve Cosens
- Edited by: Jeremiah Munce; Gareth C. Scales
- Music by: Broken Social Scene
- Production companies: Shadow Shows; Corvid Pictures; Alcina Pictures
- Distributed by: Odeon Films
- Release dates: February 8, 2007 (Berlinale); November 2, 2007 (Canada)
- Running time: 77 minutes
- Country: Canada
- Language: English
- Box office: $33,183 (domestic)

The Tracey Fragments is a 2007 Canadian psychological drama film directed by Bruce McDonald and written by Maureen Medved. Based on Medved's 1998 novel of the same name, it stars Elliot Page as Tracey Berkowitz exploring the city in search of her missing brother, presented in a nonlinear narrative and split screen format.

The film premiered at the 57th Berlin International Film Festival, where it was awarded the Manfred Salzgeber Prize for innovative filmmaking.

== Plot ==
Fifteen-year-old Tracey Berkowitz is first seen naked in a tattered shower curtain at the back of a bus, looking for her little brother Sonny, who thinks he's a dog. The film shares its story in choppy, disjointed fragments, telling the story from Tracey's point of view.

Tracey is a caustic, sarcastic, and vulgar teenager, living with her well-meaning but often verbally abusive and neglectful parents. Bullied at her public school, Tracey's closest person to a friend is her homely psychiatrist, Dr. Heker, who is at first cold to her and doubtful of her perception of the world as accurate. Tracey is seen briefly in a flashback at a police station, while her parents tearfully demand to know where their son is. Tracey reveals that she hypnotized Sonny into behaving like a dog, a game between siblings that actually manifested into Sonny acting like a dog all the time, angering her father, who finds it an annoying phase. Sonny gives Tracey a necklace on her birthday, and he's the only person who Tracey expresses a great deal of affection for. Not long after that, Sonny disappeared during a freak blizzard, something shown to be connected with an older boy Tracey had a crush on called "Billy Zero". She fantasizes about Billy and her in a famous tabloid relationship, in which they run a metalcore band duet with Tracey taking on the stage name "Estuary Palomino" and bleaching her hair blonde.

Tracey's everyday world is shown to involve riding the buses in Manitoba repeatedly, looking for Sonny, having stopped attending classes or living at home. Dr. Heker becomes more curious about Tracey's strange behaviour, and wonders if she has borderline personality disorder. Tracey recalls in a flashback her father telling her a bedtime story about Sonny's birth as a child. He tells her that Sonny's mother was a dog who died up north, a statement that confuses Tracey. Meanwhile, on the bus, she begins associating with the other lost and homeless people of the city, mostly hipsters and junkies with similar lives to hers and not a lot of money or emotional support. Tracey witnesses physical violence, drug use, sex and alcohol consumption in her new environment. She asks Dr. Heker if she could rent a room in her house. Dr. Heker, pitying Tracey, explains that there are ethical boundaries preventing such an arrangement, and she urges Tracey to go home and reconcile with her family. Tracey stays in the apartment of a grown man, Lance, who promises to help her. She becomes fixated on a crow that keeps stopping by a broken window in the building, and she tries to fit in with an older adult crowd. When Tracey is nearly raped in the apartment, she uses a rusty tin can lid to defend herself, escaping with no clothes on, only the flower-print shower curtain around her shoulders that she grabbed from the apartment at the last minute.

A final flashback reveals that, on the night of the blizzard, Tracey was grounded but escaped her house under the guise of "taking Sonny for a walk" while she went to meet Billy. Billy, only interested in hooking up, had sex with Tracey in the back of his car at a deserted park. During this time, Sonny disappeared. It is implied that he fell in the river and drowned. Tracey is devastated. A final fragment shows Tracey wandering naked under her shower curtain, ignorant of Billy's attempt to speak with her, through a Winnipeg park at night. The ground has grass on it, in contrast to the film's mostly winter weather and snow, suggesting a full season has gone by since Sonny's disappearance in the blizzard.

== Cast ==
- Elliot Page as Tracey Berkowitz
- Ari Cohen as Mr. Berkowitz
- Maxwell McCabe-Lokos as Lance
- Erin McMurtry as Mrs. Berkowitz
- Slim Twig as Billy Zero
- Julian Richings as Dr. Heker
- Kate Todd as Debbie Dodge
- Ryan Cooley as David Goldberg
- Libby Adams as Young Tracey Berkowitz
- Zie Souwand as Sonny Berkowitz
- Derek Scott as Headstand Johnny
- Sydney Rodgers as Tracey Berkowitz Imagination
- Stephen Amell as Detective
- George Stroumboulopoulos as himself

== Production ==
A multiframe sequence from the film showing its visual style, which polarized critics.

McDonald read the book and called it "like a contemporary Catcher in the Rye", and contacted Medved, who wrote a first draft script that was used in the film. McDonald decided to use multiframe techniques and split screen format with mosaic images, which was inspired by sources as diverse as The Thomas Crown Affair, The Boston Strangler, a Beastie Boys video, and Piet Mondrian's paintings. Using as many as eight frames at once, McDonald wanted to show the fragmented nature of Tracey's mind and offer "windows" into her consciousness, therefore each section of the screen offers a different perspective or camera angle of the same scene.

=== Casting ===
Page was McDonald's first choice, and he originally talked to him when he was 15, the same age as the character. The actor had been recommended to him by Daniel MacIvor and Wiebke von Carolsfeld, the writer and director of the 2002 film in which Page stars, Marion Bridge. At the time, Page said he felt he wasn't quite ready to take on the part, which was described as "a gruelling portrait of a girl suffering from everything from psychiatric abuse to near rape". His decision turned out well, as McDonald wasn't able to raise the financing until Page was a little more grown up.

=== Filming and editing ===
Principal photography began in early 2006 as an adaptation of the novel. Filming lasted 14 days over a period of four weeks in the spring of 2006, and took place in Toronto, Brantford, and the suburbs of Hamilton, Ontario. Cinematographer Steve Cosens shot the film on Panasonic DVX100 at 24p frame rate, with 35 mm film stock. Post-production took almost nine months, along with three editors working on two Macs using Apple Final Cut Pro. One particular bloom sequence used all 99 available tracks of Final Cut Pro, generating nearly 200 minutes of running footage inside two minutes of actual running time. Assistant editor Matt Hannam graduated to become the third member of the editing team while working on particularly complex multi-frame transition scenes.

== Soundtrack ==
The score, released on 13 May 2008, is composed by and features music from Canadian indie rock group Broken Social Scene. The soundtrack also features Fembots, Slim Twig, Duchess Says, Rose Melberg and "Land Horses", a cover version of Patti Smith's "Horses" by Land of Talk's Elizabeth Powell.

No.	Title	Performer(s)	Length
1.	"Horses"	Broken Social Scene	2:07
2.	"Cut Up"	Duchess Says	3:18
3.	"Don't Wanna Be Your Man"	Fembots	2:47
4.	"Each New Day"	Rose Melberg	2:41
5.	"Drop In the Mercury"	Broken Social Scene	3:15
6.	"Who's Gonna Know Your Name (666)"	Fembots	3:16
7.	"Gate Hearing!"	Slim Twig	4:33
8.	"Oh Lord, My Heart"	The Deadly Snakes	3:10
9.	"Hallmark"	Broken Social Scene	3:49
10.	"Gone Or Missing"	Broken Social Scene	2:43
11.	"Needle In the Head"	Broken Social Scene	2:50
Total length:			34:29

== Release ==
The Tracey Fragments was selected to open the Panorama section of the 57th Berlin International Film Festival and had its world premiere on February 8, 2007. It was distributed in Canada by Odeon Films, with world sales were handled by Bavaria Films International. It had its North American premiere at the 2007 Toronto International Film Festival on September 12. Canadian theatrical release followed on 2 November 2007. The film was also screened as part of a special series at the Museum of Modern Art on 14 and 18 March 2008. It was acquired for the United States by THINKFilm, and was released May 9, 2008, after its premiere at the AFI Film Festival in Los Angeles in November 2007.

The film was a low-budget production, and grossed $33,183 domestically in 4 theaters.

=== Critical reception ===
On review aggregation website Rotten Tomatoes, 42% of 38 critic reviews are positive. The website's critics consensus reads: "Splitscreen intensive and at times ambiguous, this Elliot Page vehicle cum psychodrama takes audacious risks that may confuse." On Metacritic it has a weighted average score of 54 out of 100, based on 10 reviews, indicating "mixed or average" reviews.

Boston Herald called the film's visuals "fascinating and ambitious", and the narrative is "like origami, folded and refolded upon itself", adding that it "should be seen by anyone interested in the art of film and the art of bravura film acting. It is also a further reminder that Page is the real thing. But we knew that already." A.O. Scott of New York Times wrote "In the hands of a more literal-minded filmmaker The Tracey Fragments might well have been dreary and unbearable, a chronicle of florid self-pity justified by arbitrary cruelty. Instead it is fierce, enigmatic and affecting. Some of this has to do with [Page], who seems to be everywhere these days in the wake of Juno (which was filmed after The Tracey Fragments) and who brilliantly embodies precocious intelligence under various forms of duress. While the full range of trauma that befalls Tracey does not seem entirely plausible, [Page] is never less than convincing." V.A. Musetto from New York Post applauded McDonald's "high-octane approach" and Page's "daring performance". Peter Howell of Toronto Star was positive toward the film, praising Page's performance and labeling the film as "a tough watch, but a rewarding one for those open to experimentation." The Playlist started their review by writing that the film "is going to be polarizing [...] not so much for the splintered film techniques, but more because of hot-button topic [Page] whose role in Juno, seemed to provoke a lot of ire of many a blogger and armchair critic who evidently hates teen girls that deign to speak in pop-cultural tones", opining that the split screen technique was "not obnoxious as it sounds" but it was "both effective and grating at times and will likely make or break the film for audiences." They concluded, "The performances are strong, the visuals are striking and romantic, the music is typically evocative yet subtle, and in spite of the dark premise, it's a lot more funny and playful than it ought to be." Boston Globe's Wesley Morris noted that Page was "an amazing combination: the Bizarro Natalie Wood and the Bizarro Wednesday Addams" in a film that "never settles on an emotional tone". Joe Neumaier of New York Daily News gave the film a negative review, referring to the film as "a grating stunt that plays like a film-school project, cutting a bland story into a million tiny irritating pieces". He also stated that Page "needs to drop the smart-aleck Juno bit and act her age." Writing for Reelviews, James Berardinelli wrote "This unexceptional and uninteresting story of a self-pitying borderline-personality teenager verges on being unwatchable as a result of McDonald's decision to bombard the audience with extraneous images in lieu of telling the story."

In his DVD review, James Musgrove from IGN stated that Page "tackles yet another intense and nuanced role", and "has never been an [actor] to shy away from different and demanding roles, always performing them with impeccable talent and dedication." Musgrove found extras to be "more or less passable". In the bottom line, Musgrove wrote "Not for everybody, but relevant to everyone. There isn't a person alive who hasn't felt like the world was falling apart around them, and it is here that we can truly empathize with Tracey. This movie may make certain viewers scratch their heads, but without the daring approach that it took, it would perhaps be nothing compared to what it became. Watch it, if only for Page's fantastic performance." The A.V. Club's Noel Murray, thought that without the "visual play", the story "wouldn't be all that exceptional" and "McDonald's collage approach is hit-and-miss, there are moments in The Tracey Fragments as exhilarating as any in recent indie cinema."

=== Accolades ===
On 11 December 2007, The Tracey Fragments was chosen as one of Canada's Top Ten Films of 2007 by Toronto International Film Festival.

Year	Award	Category	Recipient	Result	Ref.
2007	Berlin International Film Festival	Manfred Salzgeber Award	The Tracey Fragments	Won	
2007	Atlantic Film Festival	Best Canadian Feature	The Tracey Fragments	Won	
2007	Atlantic Film Festival	Best Director	Bruce McDonald	Won	
2007	Atlantic Film Festival	Best Actress	Elliot Page	Won	
2008	Vancouver Film Critics Circle Awards	Best Actress in a Canadian Film	Elliot Page	Won	
2008	Genie Awards	Achievement in Direction	Bruce McDonald	Nominated	
2008	Genie Awards	Performance by an Actress in a Leading Role	Elliot Page	Nominated	
2008	Genie Awards	Adapted Screenplay	Maureen Medved	Nominated	
2008	Genie Awards	Achievement in Editing	Jeremiah Munce, Gareth C. Scales	Nominated	
2008	Genie Awards	Achievement in Overall Sound	John Hazen, Matt Chan, Brad Dawe	Nominated	
2008	Genie Awards	Achievement in Sound Editing	Steve Munro, Paul Shikata, John Sievert, David Drainie Taylor	Nominated	
2008	Key Art Awards	International Print	The Tracey Fragments	Nominated	
2008	Directors Guild of Canada	Sound Editing – Feature	Steve Munro, David Drainie Taylor	Nominated	
2009	Women in Film and Television Vancouver Spotlight Awards	Artistic Achievement Award	Maureen Medved	Won	
2009	Chlotrudis Awards	Best Adapted Screenplay	Maureen Medved	Nominated	
2009	Chlotrudis Awards	Best Supporting Actor	Julian Richings	Nominated	

== Other media ==
=== Tracey: Re-Fragmented ===
Tracey: Re-Fragmented was a project by the director and producers that was launched on 29 October 2007, and made available all footage from the film shoot and the soundtrack to download and remix into "their own related projects, including music videos, new trailers or to re-edit the entire movie themselves". The footage was released under a Creative Commons license as four torrents, each approximately four gigabytes in size. Registration for the project ended on 31 January 2008. A contest was held for the best use of the footage, with the winner getting an Apple Final Cut Pro software prize pack and the winning material being included on the DVD release of The Tracey Fragments, in addition to a video by Ottawa-based punk band Sedatives. This was the first time in the history of cinema that a director made free downloads of a film available to fans concurrent with the film's theatrical release.

=== Comic book ===
The film and the novel inspired a comic book based on Tracey's adventures beyond the film by Andy Belanger, also titled The Tracey Fragments, that was released to promote the source materials.

=== Home media ===
A DVD launch screening in Toronto took place on 6 July 2008 with giveaways, an interview with Bruce McDonald, screenings of the Tracey: Re-Fragmented contestants and a sneak peek at McDonald's next film Pontypool, followed by a DVD release in Canada and the US two days later.
