= Pit Pony (novel) =

1990 novel by Joyce Barkhouse

- First edition cover
- Author: Joyce Barkhouse
- Illustrator: Henry Van Der Linde
- Language: English
- Genre: Children's novel
- Publisher: Gage
- Publication date: 1990
- Publication place: Canada
- Media type: Print
- Pages: 116 pp
- ISBN: 9780771570230
- OCLC: 19973684

Pit Pony is a children's historical novel written by Joyce Barkhouse. It was published in 1990 and won the first Ann Connor Brimer Award. Pit Pony was adapted for television in 1997 and 1999.

== Plot summary ==
In Pit Pony, Barkhouse describes life in a coal-mining town in turn-of-the-century Cape Breton and also deals with the importance of education. It is the story of Willie and Gem, a pit pony. Willie is an eleven-year-old boy forced by family circumstances to work as a trapper in a Cape Breton coal mine, and Gem is a Sable Island mare working as a pit pony. As they work together, a strong bond develops between boy and horse.

The book describes the grim realities of life for a young miner – cold, exhaustion, fear – discomforts and dangers that also affected the horses. When Willie and Gem are trapped in the mine during a "bump" – with falling rock and timber, and choking dust – Willie must choose between escaping with Gem or saving the life of another young miner. Willie's choice to save the young miner's life over Gem's life sets Willie free – free to leave the mines and to pursue his education. As it turns out, however, Gem had been pregnant, and her foal is saved.

== Awards ==
Pit Pony was named as notable by the Canadian Library Association; received the first Ann Connor Brimer Award in 1991 for "outstanding contribution to children's literature in Atlantic Canada"; and was the unanimous choice of Nova Scotia librarians to be produced as a Talking Book for the CNIB, for national and international distribution.

== Movie and television series ==
Pit Pony was made into a CBC-TV movie by Cochran Entertainment (1997), won three Gemini Awards, and became a 44-episode TV series.

== See also ==
- Literature of Nova Scotia
