= Elliot Page =

Canadian actor and producer (born 1987)

- Page in 2026
- Born: February 21, 1987 (age 39); Halifax, Nova Scotia, Canada
- Occupations: Actor; producer; activist
- Years active: 1997–present
- Spouse: Emma Portner (m. 2018; div. 2021)
- Awards: Full list

Elliot Page (formerly Ellen Page; born February 21, 1987) is a Canadian actor, producer, and activist. He (Note: Page uses the pronouns he/him and they/them. This article uses he/him for consistency.) is known for his leading roles across Canadian and American film and television, and for his work as an activist for LGBTQ rights and against discrimination. His accolades include nominations for an Academy Award, three BAFTA Awards, two Primetime Emmy Awards, a Golden Globe Award, and a SAG Award.

After beginning his career in television, Page earned recognition for his starring role in the film Hard Candy (2005) and for playing Kitty Pryde in X-Men: The Last Stand (2006). He starred in Juno (2007), becoming the fourth-youngest nominee for the Academy Award for Best Actress at the time. His other film credits include The Tracey Fragments (2007), Whip It (2009), Super (2010), Inception (2010), X-Men: Days of Future Past (2014), Freeheld (2015), Tallulah (2016), Close to You (2023), and The Odyssey (2026). He starred as Jodie Holmes in the video game Beyond: Two Souls (2013) and as Vanya/Viktor Hargreeves in the Netflix series The Umbrella Academy (2019–2024). Page hosted the documentary series Gaycation (2016–2017) and directed There's Something in the Water (2019).

A pro-choice feminist, he has spoken out in favor of the MeToo movement, advocated for abortion rights, and called for the end of military dictatorship in Myanmar. Page publicly came out as a lesbian in 2014, and that same year, was included in The Advocate's annual "40 Under 40" list. In 2015, he received the Human Rights Campaign Vanguard Award. Page came out as a trans man during 2020 and took the name Elliot. In March 2021, he became the first openly transgender man to appear on the cover of Time magazine.

== Early life ==
Page was born on February 21, 1987, in Halifax, Nova Scotia, to Martha Philpotts, a teacher, and Dennis Page, a graphic designer. He was assigned female at birth and went by the given name Ellen prior to his gender transition in 2020. Page attended Halifax Grammar School until grade 10, and also attended Queen Elizabeth High School. After graduating from the Shambhala School in 2005, Page spent two years in Toronto studying in the Interact Program at Vaughan Road Academy, along with his close friend and fellow Canadian actor Mark Rendall.

== Career ==
=== Early work ===
Page first acted on camera in 1997 at the age of ten, starring as Maggie Maclean in the CBC Television film Pit Pony, which later spun off into a television series of the same name that ran from 1999 to 2000. For the television series role, he was nominated for a Gemini Award (Note: Nominated as Ellen Philpotts Page) and Young Artist Award. (Note: Nominated as Ellen Page) In 2002, Page starred as Joanie in the film Marion Bridge, which is noted for being his first feature-film role. In the same year, he was cast in the television series Trailer Park Boys in the recurring role of Treena Lahey, which he played for five episodes.

Page had roles in the films Touch & Go and Love That Boy in the early 2000s, and he also starred in the television films Homeless to Harvard: The Liz Murray Story and Ghost Cat in the same year. For Ghost Cat, he won the Gemini Award for Best Performance in a Children's or Youth Program or Series. In 2004, Page starred in the drama Wilby Wonderful, for which he won an award at the Atlantic Film Festival and was nominated for a Genie Award. Also in 2004, he had a recurring role in season 1 of the series ReGenesis as Lilith Sandström, daughter of the show's protagonist.

=== 2000s: Breakthrough and acclaim ===
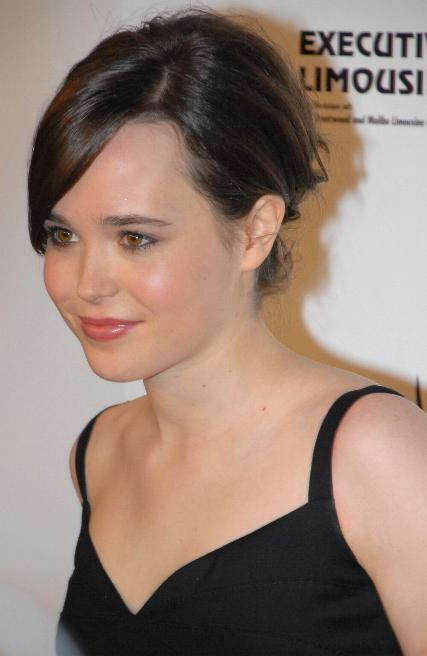
Page at the Hollywood Life Awards in 2007

In 2005, Page starred in the film Hard Candy as Hayley Stark, a teenage girl who takes a sexual predator hostage. Claudia Puig of USA Today wrote that Page "manages to be both cruelly callous and likable" and that he gave "one of the most complex, disturbing and haunting performances of the year". The film was a commercial success, and Page won the Austin Film Critics Association Award for Best Actress in 2006 for his performance, among other awards and nominations.

His other film release in 2005 was the drama Mouth to Mouth. In 2006, he appeared in X-Men: The Last Stand (2006) as Kitty Pryde, a girl who can walk through walls. In the previous X-Men films, the part had been used in brief cameos played by other actors, but never as a main character. The film was a commercial success.

In 2007, he had a breakthrough role as Juno, a pregnant teenager, in the coming-of-age comedy-drama film Juno, which was a critical and financial success. A. O. Scott of The New York Times described Page as "frighteningly talented", "mature beyond [his] years" and "disarmingly childlike". Roger Ebert said that no other actor had a better performance in 2007 than Page, whose "presence and timing are extraordinary". For his performance, Page was nominated for several awards, including an Academy Award for Best Actress, a BAFTA Award for Best Actress in a Leading Role, a Critics' Choice Award for Best Actress, a Golden Globe Award for Best Actress — Motion Picture Comedy or Musical, and a Screen Actors Guild Award for Outstanding Performance by a Female Actor in a Leading Role. He also won a Canadian Comedy Award, an Independent Spirit Award, and a Satellite Award for the role, as well as numerous critics awards, including Detroit Film Critics Society, Austin Film Critics Association and Florida Film Critics Circle.

In 2007, Page also appeared in The Stone Angel, and led the films An American Crime and The Tracey Fragments, the latter of which also earned him critical acclaim, with the Boston Herald writing that "It is also a further reminder that Page is the real thing. But we knew that already". He won the Vancouver Film Critics Circle Award for Best Actress in a Canadian Film, among other accolades. In 2008, Page co-starred in the comedy-drama film Smart People, which premiered in January that year at the Sundance Film Festival, and received a mixed response from critics. In the film, he played the overachieving daughter of a college professor.

On March 1, 2008, Page hosted Saturday Night Live. On May 3, 2009, he guest starred in "Waverly Hills 9-0-2-1-D'oh", an episode of The Simpsons, as the character Alaska Nebraska, a parody of Hannah Montana. In September 2009, he starred in Drew Barrymore's directorial debut, Whip It, as a member of a roller derby team. The film premiered at the 2009 Toronto International Film Festival and had its wide release on October 2, 2009.

=== 2010s: Rise to prominence ===
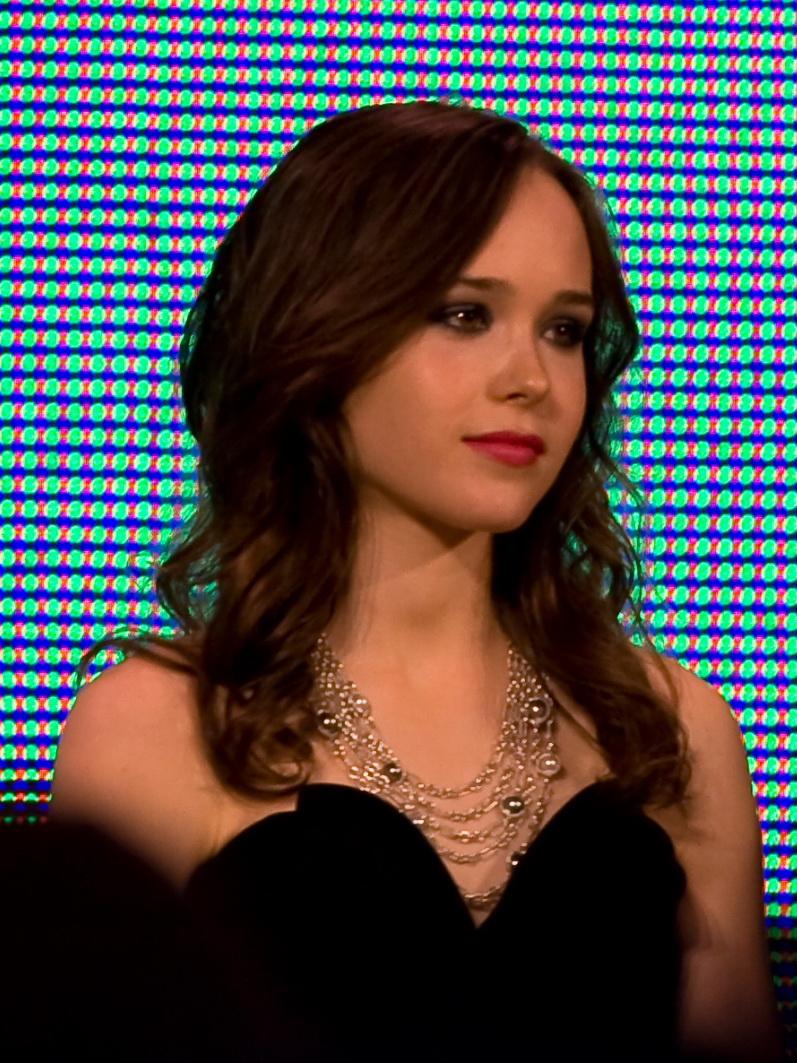
Page at the 2009 Toronto Film Festival

In August 2009, Page was cast in the big-budget Christopher Nolan science fiction film Inception, which began filming the same year. The film was released on July 16, 2010, and was a commercial success. It received widespread acclaim from critics, being hailed as one of the best films of the 2010s. Page played Ariadne, an architecture student who is a newcomer to dream espionage. The cast, including Page, earned several accolades, with Page earning nominations from the Saturn Awards and the MTV Awards. He also starred in the 2010 black comedy superhero film Super, which he accepted after seeing the script for the film. The film received mixed reviews, though Page was praised for his performance as a psychopathic teenage sidekick. In January 2010, Page began appearing in a series of advertisements for Cisco Systems, including commercials set in Lunenburg, Nova Scotia. That April, the Michael Lander film Peacock featured Page as Maggie Bailey, a struggling young mother. Page noted the film as "one of the boldest screenplays I've come across in my albeit short career; it's a character and story I can throw myself into and exactly the type of movie I love to be a part of".

In April 2011, it was announced that Page would co-star as Monica in the Woody Allen film To Rome with Love, a film told in four separate vignettes; the film was released in 2012. In June 2012, Quantic Dream announced the video game Beyond: Two Souls, in which Page portrays one of the main player characters, Jodie Holmes, through voice acting and motion-capture acting; it was released on October 8, 2013, in North America. The game polarized critics, but Page earned praise for his performance, with GamesTM calling it "truly breathtaking ... Jodie's character is one we've seen before in many films – a troubled child with a gift, haunted by spirits, struggling with growing up", but Page excelled in giving "gravity and warmth" to the character. He was given various awards and nominations for the role, including the British Academy Games Award for Best Performer. In 2013, another video game, The Last of Us, was released. Page accused the production for using his likeness without permission for the character Ellie; the character's appearance was subsequently redesigned to better reflect the actual performer's personality and make the character younger.

In 2013, Page stated that his directorial debut would be Miss Stevens, and would star Anna Faris and be produced by Gary Gilbert, Jordan Horowitz and Doug Wald; the project eventually moved forward without Page, with scriptwriter Julia Hart replacing Page as the director. Also in 2013, he co-starred in Zal Batmanglij's thriller The East, a film inspired by the experiences and drawing on thrillers from the 1970s, and he also starred in Lynn Shelton's Touchy Feely. In 2014, Page reprised his role as Kitty Pryde in X-Men: Days of Future Past (2014). The film was a major box-office success, and received positive reviews from critics, being noted as one of the best films in the X-Men franchise. Page was praised for his performance and was nominated for the Teen Choice Award for Choice Movie Scene Stealer and the Kids' Choice Award for Female Action Star. In December 2014, Page portrayed Han Solo in a staged reading of Star Wars Episode V: The Empire Strikes Back.

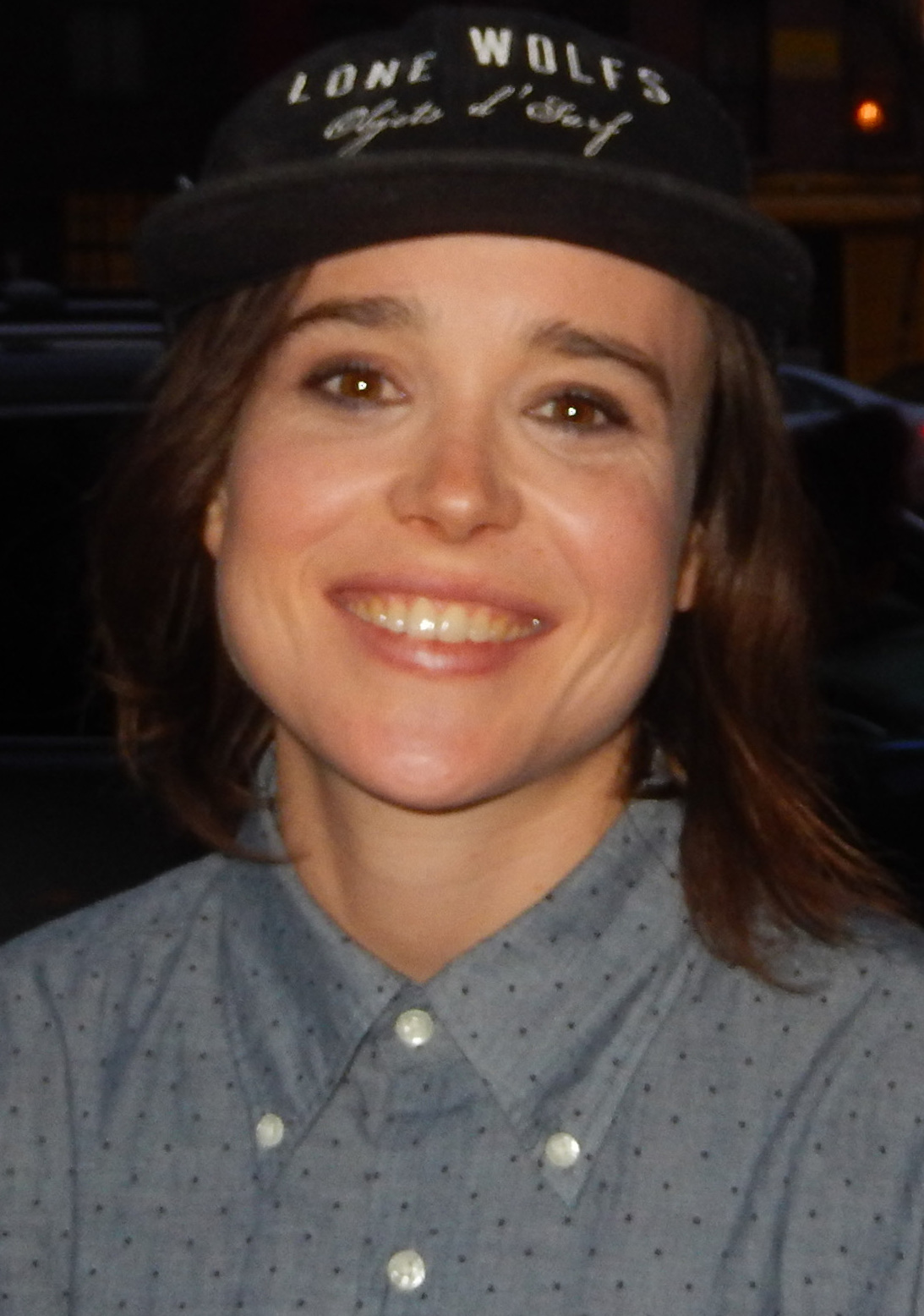
Page in 2015

In 2015, Page starred in and produced the film Freeheld, about Laurel Hester, which was adapted from the 2007 short film of the same name. The film received a mixed response from critics, with review site Rotten Tomatoes writing that "Freeheld certainly means well, but its cardboard characters and by-the-numbers drama undermine its noble intentions". In 2016, Page co-starred in the Netflix film Tallulah as the eponymous character; the film marked his third collaboration with director Sian Heder, and his second collaboration with Allison Janney, both of whom he worked with on Juno. In the film, his character is a young woman who abducts a baby and tries to pass it off as her own. On his acting, The Guardian wrote "...what grounds it are the terrific performances and Heder's rich direction and screenplay". In the same year, he appeared in the film Window Horses and provided the English voice of Rosy in the French film My Life as a Zucchini, the latter of which earned critical acclaim and a nomination for the Academy Award for Best Animated Feature.

On November 9, 2017, Page was cast in the main role of Vanya (later Viktor) Hargreeves in the Netflix superhero series The Umbrella Academy. The show received positive reviews from critics, and Page was acclaimed for his performance, earning a Saturn Award nomination in 2019 and winning the Saturn Award for Best Supporting Actor on Television in 2022. After Page came out as transgender, it was revealed that he would continue his role in the show, with Netflix updating Page's name across the service. In March 2022, it was announced that Page's character would return in the upcoming third season and transition to male; the character briefly comes out to his siblings during "World's Biggest Ball of Twine". Gizmodo reported that the change "was very likely done to reflect Page's own transition".

Page headlined the science-fiction film Flatliners, a remake of the 1990 film of the same title which was released in 2017, emerging as a commercial success. Flatliners was panned by critics, although Page and the ensemble cast were praised, with film critic Matt Zoller Seitz writing that "Luna and Page in particular make much stronger impressions than you might expect, given the repetitious and mostly shallow scenarios they're asked to enact ... But the choppy, cliched visuals and the script's superficial approach to the characters' predicaments ultimately undo any goodwill that the actors can generate." Also in 2017, he produced and starred in the film The Cured. In 2019, Page starred in the Netflix miniseries Tales of the City as Shawna Hopkins, which received positive reviews.

=== 2020s: Expansion ===
Page, along with Ian Daniel, directed and produced the documentary There's Something in the Water, which is about environmental racism; the film premiered at the 2019 Toronto International Film Festival, and was later released on Netflix on March 27, 2020. The film received positive reviews from critics, with The Hollywood Reporter writing that the film, while "made in a standard documentary format that includes a voiceover and a tad too much weepy music", "gets its job done directly enough, underlining a situation that remains dire despite what seems to be a growing level awareness around the country". Page will next have a voice role in the upcoming film Naya Legend of the Golden Dolphin and Robodog.

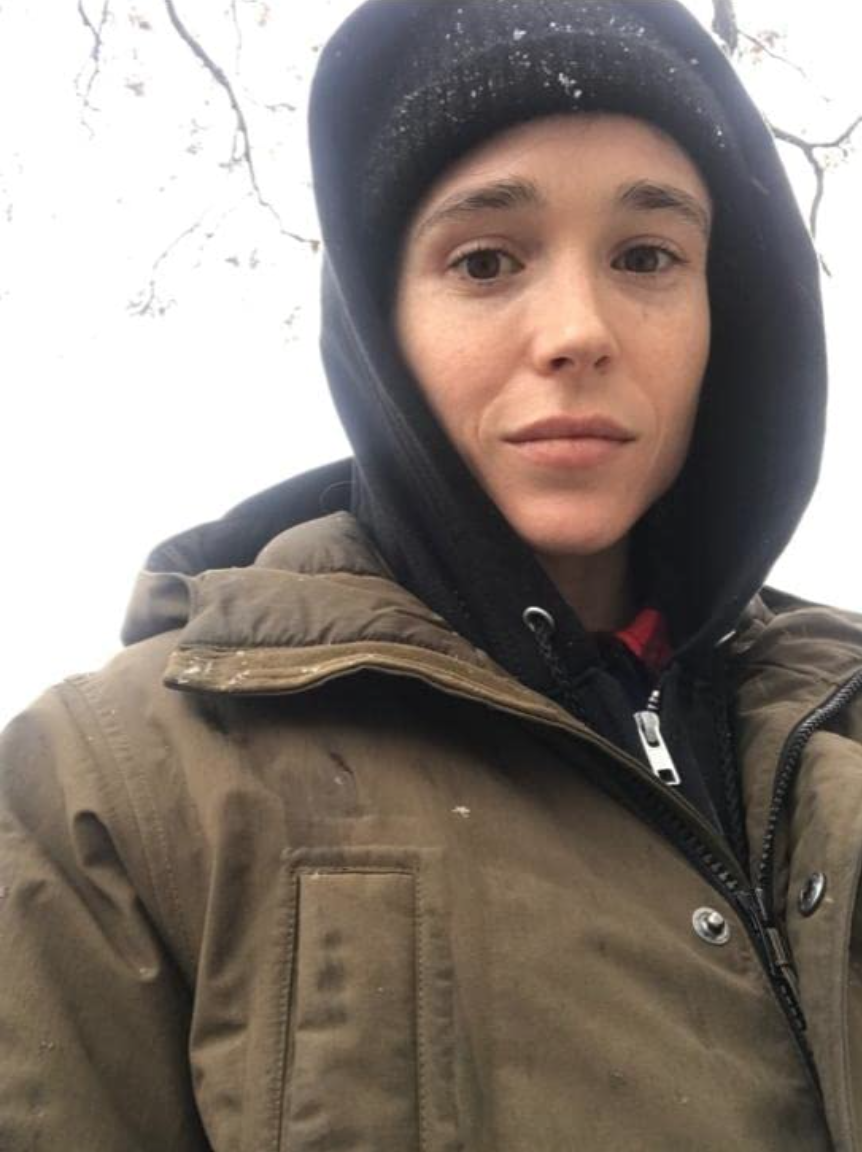
A 2021 selfie by Page

In August 2021, Page collaborated with Mark Rendall for a music release on Bandcamp. The three-track EP has been described as a "lo-fi bedroom pop adventure" in the press. In August 2021, he signed an overall deal with Universal Content Productions. In September 2021, Page launched a production company, Page Boy Productions, and appointed Matt Jordan Smith to serve as Head of Development and Production. In February 2022, it was announced that Flatiron Books had acquired the publishing rights to Pageboy, a memoir written by Page, for $3 million, with the book set to release in June 2023. The memoir debuted at the top of The New York Times Best Sellers List for Nonfiction.

In October 2022, PageBoy Productions announced the project Backspot with him acting as executive producer. Filming in Toronto on the production wrapped in March 2023. In June 2023, it was reported that he served as a producer, screenwriter and actor on the upcoming drama film Close to You, which had just wrapped filming. Both films premiered at the 2023 Toronto International Film Festival. Page was praised for his performance in the latter, winning an award at the 2023 Calgary International Film Festival.

As of June 2022, Page was writing a screenplay with his Mouth to Mouth co-star Beatrice Brown. In January 2025, it was announced that he would be developing a television adaptation of Beyond: Two Souls after his production company acquired the rights from Quantic Dream. Page reunited with Christopher Nolan for The Odyssey (2026). He narrated the 2026 nature documentary Second Nature.

== Personal life ==
=== Sexuality and gender ===
On February 14, 2014, Page came out as a lesbian during his speech at the Human Rights Campaign's "Time to Thrive" conference in Las Vegas. (Note: Attributed to multiple references:) In a November 2017 Facebook post, he shared his experiences of sexual harassment and assault in the workplace, and claimed to have been outed at age 18 by filmmaker Brett Ratner while on the set of X-Men: The Last Stand. Page's claim was corroborated by his co-star Anna Paquin, who said she witnessed the interaction. In 2014, Page was included in The Advocate's annual "40 Under 40" list. In 2015, he received the Human Rights Campaign Vanguard Award.

Page's 2021 appearance on Time was the first for an openly trans man.

On December 1, 2020, Page came out on social media as a trans man, specifying his pronouns as he and they, and revealed his new name, Elliot. Page explained that his decision to speak openly about his gender identity was partially prompted by the COVID-19 pandemic, and partially by the anti-transgender rhetoric in politics and the news cycle. GLAAD spokesperson Nick Adams stated that Page "will now be an inspiration to countless trans and non-binary people".

Page's former wife, Emma Portner, expressed support for him coming out that same day on her Instagram account, saying she was "so proud" of Page. Netflix tweeted: "So proud of our superhero! We love you Elliot!" Canadian prime minister Justin Trudeau and various celebrities including Ellen DeGeneres, Miley Cyrus, James Gunn, and Kumail Nanjiani, expressed support for Page after the announcement. That same day, Netflix announced that it would update Page's credits and metadata across all titles to reflect his name. These changes were completed by December 8, 2020.

Page appeared on the cover of the March 29 / April 5, 2021, issue of Time, making him the first openly trans man to do so. He requested that Wynne Neilly photograph him for the cover because he wanted another transgender person to be the photographer. In the featured article, he described himself as queer and non-binary, and revealed that at the time he came out, he had been recovering from undergoing top surgery (subcutaneous mastectomy), a process that he described as "life-saving". Page also revealed that at the age of nine, he first talked about his gender identity: "I felt like a boy ... I wanted to be a boy. I would ask my mom if I could be someday."

=== Relationships ===
Page had a romantic relationship with Olivia Thirlby during the filming of Juno (2007). In 2014, he briefly dated Kate Mara, his co-star in Tiny Detectives (2014) and My Days of Mercy (2017). In 2017, Page and Emma Portner revealed that they were in a relationship, and in January 2018, Page announced that they were married. (Note: Attributed to multiple references:) Page and Portner separated in 2020 and divorced in 2021, though they remained close friends afterwards. In June 2025, Page announced that he was in a relationship with actress Julia Shiplett.

=== Activism and beliefs ===
Page is vegan, and People for the Ethical Treatment of Animals (PETA) named him and Jared Leto the Sexiest Vegetarians of 2014. He is an atheist, and once said that religion "has always been used for beautiful things, and also as a way to justify discrimination". In 2008, Page was a self-described pro-choice feminist on abortion rights. He was one of 30 celebrities who participated in a 2008 online advertisement series for US Campaign for Burma, calling for an end to the military dictatorship in Myanmar.

Page is a signatory of the Film Workers for Palestine boycott pledge that was published in September 2025. In September 2026, Page attended a protest ahead of a speech by Israeli prime minister Benjamin Netanyahu at the United Nations General Assembly.

== Filmography ==
=== Film ===
Year	Title	Role	Notes	Ref.
2002	The Wet Season	Jocelyn	Short film	
2002	Marion Bridge	Joanie		
2002	Touch & Go	Trish		
2003	Love That Boy	Suzanna		
2004	Wilby Wonderful	Emily Anderson		
2005	Hard Candy	Hayley Stark		
2005	Mouth to Mouth	Sherry		
2006	X-Men: The Last Stand	Kitty Pryde		
2007	An American Crime	Sylvia Likens		
2007	Juno	Juno MacGuff		
2007	The Tracey Fragments	Tracey Berkowitz		
2007	The Stone Angel	Arlene Simmons		
2008	Smart People	Vanessa Wetherhold		
2009	Vanishing of the Bees	Narrator	Voice; documentary	
2009	Whip It	Bliss Cavendar / Babe Ruthless		
2010	Peacock	Maggie Bailey		
2010	Inception	Ariadne		
2010	Super	Libby / Boltie		
2012	To Rome with Love	Monica		
2013	The East	Izzy		
2013	Touchy Feely	Jenny		
2014	X-Men: Days of Future Past	Kitty Pryde		
2014	Tiny Detectives	Detective Ellen	Short film	
2015	Into the Forest	Nell	Also producer	
2015	Freeheld	Stacie Andree	Also producer	
2016	Tallulah	Tallulah		
2016	Window Horses	Kelly (voice)		
2016	My Life as a Zucchini	Rosy	Voice; English dub	
2017	My Days of Mercy	Lucy Moro	Also producer	
2017	The Cured	Abbie	Also producer	
2017	Flatliners	Courtney Holmes		
2019	There's Something in the Water	Himself	Documentary; also director	
2022	Into My Name	—N/a	Documentary; executive producer	
2023	Backspot	—N/a	Executive producer	
2023	Close to You	Sam	Also writer and producer	
2025	The Tiger	Braxton	Short film	
2026	Second Nature	Narrator	Voice	
2026	The Odyssey	Sinon		

=== Television ===
Year	Title	Role	Notes	Ref.
1997	Pit Pony	Maggie Maclean	Television film	
1999–2000	Pit Pony	Maggie Maclean	Main role	
2002	Trailer Park Boys	Treena Lahey	5 episodes	
2002	Rideau Hall	Helene	Episode: "Pilot"	
2003	Homeless to Harvard: The Liz Murray Story	Young Lisa	Television film	
2003	Going For Broke	Jennifer Bancroft	Television film	
2003	Ghost Cat	Natalie Merritt	Television film	
2004	I Downloaded a Ghost	Stella Blackstone	Television film	
2004	ReGenesis	Lilith Sandström	8 episodes	
2008	Saturday Night Live	Himself	Host; episode: "Ellen Page/Wilco"	
2009	The Simpsons	Alaska Nebraska	Voice; episode: "Waverly Hills, 9-0-2-1-D'oh"	
2011	Glenn Martin, DDS	Robot Assistant	Voice; episode: "Date with Destiny"	
2011	Tilda	Carolyn	Pilot	
2012	Family Guy	Lindsey	Voice; episode: "Tom Tucker: The Man and His Dream"	
2013	Out There	Amber	Voice; episode: "Ace's Wild"	
2016–2017	Gaycation	Himself	Host; also executive producer	
2019–2024	The Umbrella Academy	Viktor/Vanya Hargreeves	Main role	
2019	Tales of the City	Shawna Hawkins	Main role	
2024	Ark: The Animated Series	Victoria Walker	Voice; main role	

=== Video games ===
Year	Title	Role	Notes
2013	Beyond: Two Souls	Jodie Holmes	Voice and motion-capture

== Awards and nominations ==
For his performance in Juno (2007), Page received several awards and nominations in Best Breakthrough Performance and Best Actress categories, winning three Teen Choice Awards, a Canadian Comedy Award and a Satellite Award, as well as nominations for two British Academy Film Awards (BAFTAs), an Academy Award (Oscar) and a Golden Globe Award. His roles in the drama films The Tracey Fragments (2007), Freeheld (2015) and Close to You (2023), the sci-fi film Inception (2010), and the superhero works X-Men: Days of Future Past (2014) and The Umbrella Academy (2019–present) earned him numerous accolades.

Page hosted the television documentary series Gaycation (2016) alongside Ian Daniel, which earned him two Primetime Emmy Award nominations. He additionally served as a voice and motion capture actor in the video game Beyond: Two Souls in 2013, garnering five award nominations, including a nomination for a British Academy Games Award for Performer in 2014.

== See also ==
- List of atheists in film, radio, television and theater
- List of actors with Academy Award nominations
- List of Canadian Academy Award winners and nominees
- List of Canadian actors
- List of LGBTQ Academy Award winners and nominees
- List of oldest and youngest Academy Award winners and nominees – Youngest nominees for Best Actress in a Leading Role
- List of transgender film and television directors
