= Wild Creatures =

Compilation album by Neko Case
- Released: April 22, 2022
- Language: English
- Label: ANTI-

Neko Case chronology
Hell-On (2018)	Wild Creatures (2022)	Neon Grey Midnight Green (2025)

I have a very good relationship with ANTI-, so I worked a lot with [founder] Andy Kaulkin on it. There’s something they can see that I can’t, which is what it seems like from the outside — which I can’t really see, because I’m me. I have thoughts and opinions about things that are from a very narrow perspective, whereas they have input. There are eyes and ears everywhere on their end, whereas I’m one person. So, it was a community effort.

—Neko Case on choosing tracks to appear on Wild Creatures

Wild Creatures is a 2022 compilation album by American singer-songwriter Neko Case. It was released digitally that year, and physically in 2023. The retrospective includes songs from her entire solo career—minus debut album The Virginian—as well as a new track and has received positive reviews from critics. Case has promoted the release with custom animations for each song, a series of live-streamed events, and a concert tour.

== Reception ==
Editors at AllMusic chose this as one of their favorite archival releases of the year and rated this album 4.5 out of 5 stars, with critic Mark Deming writing that Case's "body of work that...never fails to impress with her silky but bold vocals, her inventive melodic sense, her atmospheric and evocative arrangements, and lyrics that are deeply personal and artful while also being powerfully direct and emotionally forceful" and he characterized this compilation as "a deeply satisfying sampling from her first 25 years, and it's hard not to believe (or hope) she has another 25 this good still in her". Justin Cober-Lake of PopMatters gave this collection a 7 out of 10, praising the songs, but stating that it "feels like a missed opportunity in a way" due to not displaying the shifts in Case's sound, although he still declared this "a fantastic listen".

== Track listing ==
All songs written by Neko Case, except where noted.

No.	Title	Writer(s)	Original album	Length
1.	"I'm an Animal"		Middle Cyclone	2:29
2.	"Lady Pilot"		Blacklisted	2:27
3.	"Halls of Sarah"	Case, Paul Rigby	Hell-On	3:52
4.	"Man"	Case, Rigby	The Worse Things Get, the Harder I Fight, the Harder I Fight, the More I Love You	3:29
5.	"Star Witness"		Fox Confessor Brings the Flood	5:18
6.	"I Wish I Was the Moon"		Blacklisted	3:34
7.	"The Next Time You Say Forever"		Middle Cyclone	1:47
8.	"Favorite"		Canadian Amp	3:44
9.	"Hell-On"	Case, Rigby	Hell-On	4:01
10.	"Hold On, Hold On"	Case, The Sadies	Fox Confessor Brings the Flood	2:44
11.	"Polar Nettles"		Middle Cyclone	2:33
12.	"Wild Creatures"		The Worse Things Get, the Harder I Fight, the Harder I Fight, the More I Love You	2:40
13.	"Furnace Room Lullaby"	Case, Travis Good	Furnace Room Lullaby	2:56
14.	"A Widow's Toast"		Fox Confessor Brings the Flood	1:39
15.	"Deep Red Bells"		Blacklisted	4:04
16.	"This Tornado Loves You"		Middle Cyclone	3:19
17.	"Winnie"	Case, Rigby	Hell-On	3:52
18.	"Night Still Comes"		The Worse Things Get, the Harder I Fight, the Harder I Fight, the More I Love You	3:48
19.	"Maybe Sparrow"		Fox Confessor Brings the Flood	2:37
20.	"Things That Scare Me"	Case, Tom Ray	Blacklisted	2:36
21.	"The Tigers Have Spoken"	Case, The Sadies	The Tigers Have Spoken	2:58
22.	"Set Out Running"	Case, Peter Elkas, Ben Gunning, Ryan Myshrall, Jason Tustin	Furnace Room Lullaby	2:56
23.	"Oh, Shadowless"	Case, Rigby	Previously unreleased	2:30

== See also ==
- 2022 in American music
- List of 2022 albums
