= Fox Confessor Brings the Flood =

Studio album by Neko Case
- Released: March 7, 2006
- Studios: Wavelab, Tucson
- Genre: Alternative country
- Length: 35:43
- Label: ANTI-
- Producers: Neko Case, Darryl Neudorf

Neko Case chronology
The Tigers Have Spoken (2004)	Fox Confessor Brings the Flood (2006)	Live from Austin, TX (2007)

Fox Confessor Brings the Flood is the fourth solo album by American alt-country musician Neko Case, released March 7, 2006 by ANTI- Records. The album was found on many “best of” lists that year and had a bonus disc released by ANTI- in November of the following year.

== Recording and production ==
The album was recorded at Wave Lab Studios in Tucson, Arizona, except the beginning of "John Saw That Number", recorded in a stairwell at Toronto's Horseshoe Tavern; and "At Last", which was tracked at Toronto's Iguana studio. Case is backed by several collaborators, including bandmates Jon Rauhouse and Tom V. Ray, as well as frequent collaborators The Sadies, Giant Sand's leader Howe Gelb, vocalist Kelly Hogan, Calexico's Joey Burns and John Convertino, and Canadian cohorts Brian Connelly and Paul Rigby. Rachel Flotard of Seattle punk-pop combo Visqueen also guests, as does multi-instrumentalist Garth Hudson of The Band. The album was engineered by Craig Schumacher and Chris Schultz, and produced and mixed by Neko Case and Darryl Neudorf. It sold 194,000 copies in the United States through December 2008. Fox Confessor Brings the Flood (Bonus Disc Version) was released November 6, 2007, which includes five additional songs. The original track listing was used for the Record Store Day 2015 re-release on red colored vinyl.

Fox Confessor Brings the Flood was produced by Darryl Neudorf and co-produced by Case. Neudorf helped mix, produce and engineer other Case albums including The Virginian (1997), Furnace Room Lullaby (2000), Blacklisted (2002), The Tigers Have Spoken (2005), Fox Confessor Brings the Flood (Bonus Disc Version) (2007) and Middle Cyclone (2009). He helped produce and engineer for other artists such as Sarah McLachlan, The Sadies and The Mohawk Lodge.

== Musical style, writing, and composition ==
Upon its release, Fox Confessor was praised as Case’s most stunning album. The album covers a wide range of emotions in a variety of styles. Case blends gospel and early rock influences, and Case classified her style as “country-noir”.

Much of the album is praised for masterful weaving of emotion and suggestive description. Case offers that the songs on this album were created by writing a lot of words and paring them back so that it is not “overly literal”. She gives hints and helps her listeners to use their imagination to fill in the gaps. “That Teenage Feeling” is praised as a 1950s-style pop ballad that suggests a memory of intense and passionate love, while “Hold On, Hold On” tells the story of the artist leaving a wedding reception, relieved to be alone, with drugs from the bride. In “John Saw That Number”, Case mixes words of “an old American spiritual with a musical idea from India” and “Widow’s Toast” is an example of the artist creating “more space on the record” in order to make what is there stand out. Case began recording the track with a full band, but the removed all components for the final product. This track also deviates from the standard verse-chorus-verse structure of many contemporary songs.

== Inspiration ==
Most of the songs in this album are based on her life experiences. Case said on one of her interviews "I've always been fascinated by fairy tales, But we really don't have fairy tales anymore. Movies have taken their place, and modern fiction seems to be in this rut of the coming-of-age story, which is getting really boring. I'm trying to find things on the outer limits of experience. I really love the Eastern European fairy tales because they're not only dark but they're also funny and not overly moral."

== Reception and legacy ==
Professional ratings
Aggregate scores
Source	Rating
Metacritic	85/100
Review scores
Source	Rating
AllMusic	4.5/5 stars
The A.V. Club	A−
Entertainment Weekly	A−
The Guardian	4/5 stars
Mojo	4/5 stars
NME	8/10
Pitchfork	7.7/10
Rolling Stone	3/5 stars
Spin	B+
Uncut	4/5 stars

Upon release, Fox Confessor was greeted with universal acclaim from music critics. Awarding it 4-and-a-half stars, AllMusic's Mark Deming lauded it as "rich, mature, and deeply satisfying". Entertainment Weekly's Marc Weingarten praised the "beguiling spell" Case's "death-haunted folk". Ryan Dombal of Pitchfork applauded the "natural grandeur" of Case's "peerless cries".

In 2013, Treble dubbed Fox "[Case's] most haunting, lonely and dazzling work to date." They placed the album on their list of alt-country's essential records, praising its songs as "magnificent". The site also recognized Fox's third track "Hold On, Hold On" in the genre's history, dubbing it "a haunted surf-twang barnburner". Looking back on Fox for its 10th anniversary, Billboard's Kenneth Partridge named it "an indie-rock landmark" and "an album of ugly truths beautifully rendered."

=== Accolades ===
Publication	Country	List	Year	Rank	Ref.
Paste	US	The 50 Best Alt-Country Albums of All Time	2016	14	
Paste	US	The 100 Best Indie Folk Albums of All Time	2020	12	
Pazz & Jop	US	Pazz & Jop: Top 10 Albums By Year, 1971-2017	2018	8	
Treble	US	10 Essential Alt-Country Albums	2013	-	

== Track listing ==
All songs written by Neko Case, except where noted.

1. "Margaret vs. Pauline" – 2:52
2. "Star Witness" – 5:16
3. "Hold On, Hold On" (Case, The Sadies) – 2:46
4. "A Widow's Toast" – 1:36
5. "That Teenage Feeling" – 2:42
6. "Fox Confessor Brings the Flood" (Case, Paul Rigby) – 2:42
7. "John Saw That Number" (traditional, Case) – 4:06
8. "Dirty Knife" – 3:18
9. "Lion's Jaws" (Case, The Sadies) – 2:28
10. "Maybe Sparrow" – 2:37
11. "At Last" – 1:35
12. "The Needle Has Landed" (Case, The Sadies) – 3:45

== Personnel ==
- Neko Case – vocals, acoustic & electric tenor guitars, acoustic & electric guitars, tambourine, whirly bird, piano, hammered dulcimer
- Garth Hudson – piano, organ
- Mike Belitsky – drums
- Paul Rigby – electric guitar, 12-string electric guitar, guitar loop
- Joey Burns – acoustic guitar, upright bass, cello, nylon acoustic guitar
- John Convertino – drums
- Anne de Wolff – violin
- Tom V. Ray – upright bass, bass
- Travis Good – acoustic & electric guitars
- Kelly Hogan – vocals
- Dallas Good – electric & 12-string guitars
- Sean Dean – upright bass
- Rachel Flotard – backing vocals
- Dexter Romweber – electric guitar
- Howe Gelb – electric guitar, piano
- Willie B – drums
- James SK Wān – viola
- Jon Rauhouse – banjo, Hawaiian guitar
- Brian Connelly – acoustic guitar
- Julie Morstad – artwork

== Charts ==
Chart (2006)	Peak position
US Billboard 200	54
US Independent Albums (Billboard)	4

As of 2013, sales in the United States have exceeded 233,000 copies, according to Nielsen SoundScan.
