= Middle Cyclone =

Studio album by Neko Case
- Released: March 3, 2009
- Genres: Alternative country, indie folk
- Length: 74:29
- Label: Anti-
- Producers: Neko Case, Darryl Neudorf

Neko Case chronology
Fox Confessor Brings the Flood (2006)	Middle Cyclone (2009)	The Worse Things Get, the Harder I Fight, the Harder I Fight, the More I Love You (2013)

Singles from Middle Cyclone
- 1. "People Got a Lotta Nerve" Released: January 13, 2009

Middle Cyclone is the fifth studio album of American alternative country singer-songwriter Neko Case, released on March 3, 2009, on the ANTI- record label. Her first solo effort in three years, Case stated that "it took a very long time to make". As the title of the album suggests, the record's lyrics are permeated with imagery of tornadoes and, more generally, nature. Thematically Middle Cyclone concerns how Case's upbringing socialized her to form strong emotional attachments to nature and animals, to the neglect of human relationships, and her reconciling "the fact that I need love".

Middle Cyclone features a variety of guest performers, including M. Ward, Garth Hudson, Sarah Harmer, and members of the New Pornographers, Los Lobos, Calexico, the Sadies, Visqueen, Kurt Heasley of Lilys, and Giant Sand. It also features two prominent covers: "Never Turn Your Back on Mother Earth" by Sparks and "Don't Forget Me" by Harry Nilsson.

Middle Cyclone debuted to strong reviews from contemporary mainstream and independent music critics. In particular, Case's voice garnered unanimous praise for its strength, clarity, and emotional range. In December 2009 Case was nominated for two Grammys for her work on Middle Cyclone: Best Contemporary Folk Album and Best Recording Package (the latter nomination shared with artist Kathleen Judge).

== Conception and recording ==
The recording of Middle Cyclone took place in Tucson, Brooklyn, Toronto, and Vermont. Case herself stated that only the "piano orchestra" sessions were recorded in Vermont and that the rest was recorded using WaveLab in Tucson. At the time, Case was transitioning from living in Tucson to a recently purchased farm in Vermont, where she recorded in a barn on the property. Case described how the barn was retrofitted to suit her musical needs, as well as the "piano orchestra" that appears in three of Middle Cyclone's tracks:

I didn't really convert it [the barn] into a studio. Basically the floor was made of dirt, and so I hired a friend of mine to come in and put in a wood floor and build a stage. And it looks amazing, but then we decided it would be really hilarious to see how many free pianos we could get off of—because that's how I got a piano right off the bat, but when I went on I couldn't believe how many free pianos there are on Craigslist. And I was like, well I have a barn. So I ended up with eight, which are playable. That's when I came up with the idea for the piano orchestra. I thought it would just sound so beautiful to have a bunch of people playing piano at once in that barn.

Of the eight pianos that Case rescued, six were playable after two days of tuning by two tuners. One was a broken player piano, which Case decided had the potential to be repurposed.

The open and unconstrained nature of the barn-as-recording studio resulted in several of the tracks on Middle Cyclone having elements akin to a field recording. Case asserted that because of the barn "We ended up with robins on the recording and frogs and all kinds of stuff. And with a barn, you just don't have control, which was another element I really liked." "Polar Nettles" features the aforementioned birdsong 39 seconds into the track, as well as a chorus of spring peeper frogs at the track's end. (The latter fortuitous event was recorded on video and published on ANTI-'s YouTube channel.) "Don't Forget Me" contains a gust of wind close to the song's end. The final track, "Marais La Nuit" (French for "Marsh at Night"), is an actual field recording of the environs around a pond on Case's farm. When asked about the track in an interview with Paste, Case responded "I actually went down to the pond and recorded that myself."

== Publicity ==
New material from Middle Cyclone was first widely publicized when Case performed at Bumbershoot in Seattle, WA on Saturday August 30, 2008, from 1–2:15 pm. In addition to older material such as "Favorite", "Margaret vs. Pauline", and "That Teenage Feeling", the set included four songs from the unreleased album, including "I'm an Animal", "The Pharaohs", "Don't Forget Me", and "Vengeance Is Sleeping". Fan-made video recordings of the songs were posted the next day to YouTube and received widespread attention shortly thereafter in early September when the videos were posted to websites such as Stereogum.

The cover art for Middle Cyclone was released in early December 2008. The image of Case, crouched and ready to spring off the hood of her 1967 Mercury Cougar with a sword in hand received enthusiastic responses from Internet-based media. In a news article entitled "Neko Case, Reigning 2009 Album Art Champ", Matthew Solarski of Pitchfork Media, stated "So Fox Confessor Brings the Flood had some awfully lovely, subtle artwork. But this? My friends, pictures created to accompany music just don't come any better than this." "Dear God she is wielding a sword" was the subtitle of the article. Images from the sword-and-muscle car photo shoot were also used in advertisements on the ANTI- blog to encourage preordering of Middle Cyclone.

On December 15, 2008, ANTI- released an Electronic Press Kit for Middle Cyclone in the form of a YouTube video. It features selections of an interview with Case, excerpts from several Middle Cyclone songs, footage of Case and her band performing the songs, and collage art and animation to bridge segments. The video also provided fans a first listen to parts of "Magpie to the Morning", "This Tornado Loves You", "Middle Cyclone", "Polar Nettles", and "Fever" (in addition to two already featured at Bumbershoot: "Don't Forget Me" and "People Got a Lotta Nerve").

On February 18, the entirety of Middle Cyclone was streamed by NPR until the album's release on March 3.

On February 24 the ANTI- blog released a free mp3 of Neko Case's song "Middle Cyclone" to commemorate the one year anniversary of the label's blog. The promotion also included a give-away of four autographed copies of the album, with the fifth winner receiving not only a signed copy of Middle Cyclone but also her entire ANTI- catalog: The Tigers Have Spoken, Blacklisted (reissue), Furnace Room Lullaby (reissue), Fox Confessor Brings the Flood (bonus), and Fox Confessor Brings the Flood.

=== "People Got a Lotta Nerve" ===
The first single from Middle Cyclone is "People Got a Lotta Nerve", which initially was released as a free download on January 13, 2009, on the ANTI- blog and the day after on their website. In celebration of Best Friends Animal Society's 25th anniversary in 2009, for every blogger that reposted "People Got a Lotta Nerve" or iLike user who added it to their profile, Neko Case and ANTI- made a cash donation to the charity. The promotion ran from January 13 to February 3, 2009, with five dollars donated per blog post and one per iLike profile-add.

On February 24, "People Got a Lotta Nerve" was featured as a downloadable track in the "Alt Country Pack 01" extension for the video game Rock Band 2.

Case was interviewed and performed "People Got A Lotta Nerve" live for QTV on February 24, accompanied by Paul Rigby on acoustic guitar and Kelly Hogan on backing vocals. On March 4, 2009, Case performed on The Tonight Show.

The red-head takes aim at a monkey.

On March 20 ANTI- released a music video for "People Got A Lotta Nerve" on both MTV2's early-morning show "Subterranean" and its YouTube channel. The animated video, created by brother/sister team Paul and Julie Morstad, depicts a red-headed schoolgirl – ostensibly Case – who is ejected from a killer whale's blowhole onto the grounds of an estate. The red-head witnesses the interactions of a multitude of other girls with animals, but is returned to the belly of the whale when she takes aim at one of the animals with a rifle found in the estate's manor house.

Various types of interactions between humans and animals are presented in the video, including the care, stewardship and play associated with domesticated animals, hunting, animal servitude, and man-eating. Despite the prominent repetition of the lyric "man-eater" the video does not depict men or boys. The schoolgirls' childlike activities (climbing, swinging, walking on stilts, jumping rope, piggy-back riding, pillow fighting, and clapping games) take place near and even on animals such as elephants, greyhounds, tigers, rheas, falcons, and monkeys. Animals are depicted in the video with as much agency as the humans: monkeys read pieces of paper, falcons intervene to prevent the red-head from shooting a monkey, the rhea allows two girls to ride on its back, and the tiger eats the girls brushing him. The video also contains several depictions of Case in the form of a portrait hung in the manor's stairwell and the transposition of one of Case's promotional portraits from Middle Cyclone onto the paper one of the monkeys possesses. The black comic scene in which the tiger has eaten his youthful groomers (their shoes and brushes have been left behind as the animal licks its chops) alludes to Case's song "The Tigers Have Spoken", whose lyrics describe a man-eating tiger driven mad by the isolation of captivity and shot on his chain.

== Reception ==
Professional ratings
Aggregate scores
Source	Rating
AnyDecentMusic?	7.4/10
Metacritic	79/100
Review scores
Source	Rating
AllMusic	4/5 stars
The A.V. Club	A−
Entertainment Weekly	B
The Guardian	4/5 stars
The Independent	4/5 stars
Mojo	4/5 stars
Pitchfork	7.9/10
Rolling Stone	4/5 stars
Spin	9/10
Uncut	4/5 stars

Middle Cyclone received generally positive reviews from critics. NPR praised the album's songs as "heartbreakingly-beautiful and, at times, comical" and praised Case's voice as "one of the most memorable and seductive voices in music." The New York Times' Daniel Menaker praised her "real richness and body," writing that "She has often been described as a belter, a force of nature, a kind of vocal tornado. So this increased admixture of playfulness, delicacy and orchestral effects strikes you as the kind of variegation that artists — and species — make in order to survive and thrive."

Middle Cyclone debuted at number three on the Billboard 200 albums chart in its first week of release, making it Case's first album to reach the top ten in the United States.

As of 2013, sales in the United States have exceeded 223,000 copies, according to Nielsen SoundScan. As of 2010 it has sold 17,000 copies in Canada.

== Middle Cyclone tour ==
The Europe February 2009 Tour, described as "a sneak peak [sic] of the new album", began in Berlin, Germany on Wednesday February 18, 2009, and ended on the 23rd in London, England.

Middle Cyclone's Spring 2009 Tour began at Stubb's BBQ in Austin, Texas on March 31, 2009. It then snaked through the Southeast, US East Coast, Canada, and Midwest through the end of April. It was expanded to include locales in the Southwest, US West Coast, other locales across North America, and eventually expanded to other countries such as Australia. The band Crooked Fingers opened for the majority of Case's spring 2009 shows.

Middle Cyclone tour itinerary
Date	City	Country	Venue
Europe February 2009 Tour
February 18, 2009	Berlin	Germany	Roter Salon
February 19, 2009	Munich	Germany	Orange House
February 21, 2009	Paris	France	Nouveau Casino
February 22, 2009	Amsterdam	Netherlands	Paradisio (Cancelled)
February 23, 2009	London	England	Bush Hall
Spring 2009 Tour
March 31, 2009	Austin, Texas	United States	Stubb's BBQ
April 2, 2009	Atlanta	United States	Variety Playhouse ·
April 3, 2009	Savannah, Georgia	United States	Trustees Theatre ·
April 4, 2009	Birmingham, Alabama	United States	Workplay ·
April 6, 2009	Richmond, Virginia	United States	Toad's Place ·
April 7, 2009	Raleigh, NC	United States	Meymandi Concert Hall ·
April 8, 2009	Washington, D.C.	United States	9:30 Club ·
April 9, 2009	Washington, DC	United States	9:30 Club ·
April 10, 2009	Glenside, Pennsylvania (Philadelphia)	United States	Keswick Theatre
April 11, 2009	Boston	United States	Berklee Performance Center ·
April 13, 2009	New York City	United States	Nokia Theatre Times Square ·
April 14, 2009	New York City	United States	Nokia Theatre Times Square
April 16, 2009	Montreal	Canada	Le National ·
April 17, 2009	Toronto	Canada	Trinity-St. Paul's United Church ·
April 18, 2009	Toronto	Canada	Trinity-St. Paul's United Church
April 20, 2009	Ithaca, New York	United States	State Theatre of Ithaca ·
April 21, 2009	Cleveland	United States	Allen Theatre ·
April 22, 2009	Charleston, West Virginia	United States	Charleston Civic Center Little Theatre ·
April 23, 2009	Columbus, Ohio	United States	Newport Music Hall ·
April 24, 2009	Chicago	United States	Chicago Theatre ·
April 25, 2009	Milwaukee, Wisconsin	United States	Riverside Theater ·
April 26, 2009	Minneapolis	United States	State Theatre ·
			· with Crooked Fingers

== Track listing ==
All songs written by Neko Case, except where noted.

No.	Title	Writer(s)	Length
1.	"This Tornado Loves You"		3:21
2.	"The Next Time You Say Forever"		1:46
3.	"People Got a Lotta Nerve"		2:33
4.	"Polar Nettles"		2:26
5.	"Vengeance Is Sleeping"		3:22
6.	"Never Turn Your Back on Mother Earth"	Ron Mael	2:14
7.	"Middle Cyclone"		3:05
8.	"Fever"		3:18
9.	"Magpie to the Morning"		2:44
10.	"I'm an Animal"	Neko Case; Kurt Heasley	2:21
11.	"Prison Girls"		5:25
12.	"Don't Forget Me"	Harry Nilsson	3:09
13.	"The Pharaohs"	Neko Case; Dallas Good; Travis Good; Sean Dean; Mike Belitsky	3:37
14.	"Red Tide"		2:53
15.	"Marais la nuit"		31:39
Total length:			74:29

Note

- On the vinyl release "Marais la Nuit" is shortened to about 15 minutes and takes up all of Side Four.

== Personnel ==
- Neko Case – vocals, guitar, piano, tambourine, happy apple
- Paul Rigby – guitars, piano, music box, organ, dulcimer
- Tom V. Ray – bass
- Kelly Hogan – backing vocals
- Lucy Wainwright Roche – backing vocals
- Jon Rauhouse – guitar, pedal steel, Hawaiian guitar
- Barry Mirochnick – drums
- Kurt Heasley – guitar, backing vocals
- Sarah Harmer – vocals on "Fever"
- Carolyn Mark – backing vocals on "Magpie"
- Howe Gelb – piano, guitar
- Garth Hudson – organ, piano
- Dallas Good – guitar
- Travis Good – guitar on "The Pharaohs"
- M. Ward – guitar on "Fever" and "Magpie"
- Nora O'Connor – backing vocals
- Ryan Boyles – piano
- Blaine Thurier – piano
- Kathryn Calder – piano
