= These aren't the droids you're looking for =

Quote from the film Star Wars

Scene from the movie, captioned

"These aren't the droids you're looking for" is a quote from the 1977 movie Star Wars, said by Obi-Wan Kenobi when a stormtrooper asks Obi-Wan about the droids, R2-D2 and C-3PO. It has since become an internet meme.

== The scene ==
In Star Wars (1977), when Jedi Obi-Wan Kenobi and Luke Skywalker travel to Mos Eisley to seek passage to Alderaan, they are stopped by Imperial stormtroopers with the droids R2-D2 and C-3PO in their vehicle. After a tense moment, Kenobi gestures with his hand and immediately convinces the leader of the stormtroopers both that he "[doesn't] need to see [Skywalker's] identification" and that the droids "aren't the droids [they are] looking for." The stormtrooper repeats, "These aren't the droids we're looking for" and allows them to leave. After he and Skywalker are clear of the checkpoint, Luke expresses surprise at how easily they have escaped; Kenobi explains that "The Force can have a strong influence on the weak-minded."

== Analysis ==
The scene has been called famous and iconic. The quote itself has been called catchy, familiar, used in everyday conversations.

The scene is an example of the Force use as a mind controlling psi power, known in the Star Wars universe as a "Jedi mind trick". Mind tricks, as an aspect of controversial mind control, are sometimes considered not ethical, and violating in-universe Jedi Code.

== In popular culture ==
In 1998, the American rock and roll band Queens of the Stone Age recorded a song with the phrase as its title (in the album The Split CD), while Neko Case and Kelly Hogan released a song titled "These Aren't the Droids" in 2014 (in the 2776 album). It has been used by politicians (such as American politician Mitt Romney in 2008) and appears in other works of fiction, such as the House TV series.

The meaning of the original sentence can be interpreted as "nothing of interest to you is here". It has become a popular Internet meme, generally used in the snowclone form "These Aren't the X You're Looking For" to humorously or sarcastically assert that someone is wrong, as the relevant object or concept ("X") is not representing what it appears to represent; it has a number of grammar variations, including versions not using contractions ("are not" instead of "aren't" and "you are" instead of "you're") that have been described as possibly more popular than the original variant.

In Rainbow Rowell's fantasy book series Carry On, "These aren't the droids you're looking for" is a magical formula used to redirect a person's attention away from something the caster wishes to hide.
