= Neon Grey Midnight Green =

Studio album by Neko Case
- Released: September 26, 2025
- Studio: Carnassial Singing, St. Johnsbury, Vermont; PlainsSong Chamber Orchestra, Denver, Colorado; WaveLab Studio, Portland, Oregon
- Length: 47:11
- Label: Anti-
- Producer: Neko Case

Neko Case chronology
Wild Creatures (2022)	Neon Grey Midnight Green (2025)

Professional ratings
Review scores
Source	Rating
AllMusic	4.5/5 stars
Americana UK	8/10
Paste	7.5/10
Pitchfork	8.0/10
PopMatters	8/10

Neon Grey Midnight Green is the eighth studio album by American singer-songwriter Neko Case, released by record label Anti- on September 26, 2025. Her first entirely self-produced album, it marks her follow-up to Hell-On. She has described it as being "for and about musicians, a love letter and a testimony."

From October 2025 to January 2026, Case will be touring North America with John Grant and Des Demonas in support of the album.

== Track listing ==
Neon Grey Midnight Green track listing
No.	Title	Writer(s)	Length
1.	"Destination"	Neko Case; Paul Rigby	5:48
2.	"Tomboy Gold"	Case	1:46
3.	"Wreck"	Case; Rigby	3:10
4.	"Winchester Mansion of Sound"	Case	4:48
5.	"An Ice Age"	Case; Rigby	3:32
6.	"Neon Grey Midnight Green"	Case; Rigby	4:30
7.	"Oh, Neglect..."	Case; Rigby	2:59
8.	"Louise"	Case; Rigby	4:18
9.	"Rusty Mountain"	Case; Rigby	3:29
10.	"Little Gears"	Case; Rigby	4:00
11.	"Baby I'm Not (A Werewolf)"	Case	3:03
12.	"Match-Lit"	Case; Rigby	5:47
Total length:			47:11

== Personnel ==
Credits adapted from Tidal.

- Neko Case – vocals, background vocals, arrangement, production, mixing (all tracks); electric guitar (tracks 4–6), baritone guitar (6), sleigh bells (9), acoustic guitar (10, 11)
- Tucker Martine – mixing, engineering, production assistance
- Heba Kadry – mastering
- Darryl Neudorf – engineering
- Jeff Galegher – engineering
- John Hagler – engineering
- Paul Rigby – guitar (1, 3–12)
- Rachel Flotard – background vocals (1, 3, 4, 9)
- Tom Hagerman – arrangement, violin (1, 3, 10–12)
- Nicholas Recuber – bass (1, 3, 10–12)
- Evan Orman – cello (1, 3, 10–12)
- Jeffrey Watson – cello (1, 3, 10–12)
- Michelle Orman – clarinet (1, 3, 10–12)
- Sarah Parkinson – conductor (1, 3, 10–12)
- Katy Wherry – flute (1, 3, 10–12)
- Jason Friedman – French horn (1, 3, 10–12)
- Jonathan Groszew – French horn (1, 3, 10–12)
- Tonya Jilling – harp (1, 3, 10–12)
- Max Soto – oboe (1, 3, 10–12)
- Jocelyn Hach – viola (1, 3, 10–12)
- Summer Rhodes – viola (1, 3, 10–12)
- Felix Petit – violin (1, 3, 10,–12)
- Leena Waite – violin (1, 3, 10–12)
- Nadya Hill – violin (1, 3, 10–12)
- Colin Bricker – engineering (1, 3, 10–12)
- Mitchell Gardner – engineering assistance (1, 3, 10–12)
- Sebastian Steinberg – bass (1, 4, 6, 8, 9, 11, 12)
- Steve Moore – keyboards (1, 4, 8, 12), synthesizer (4, 12)
- John Convertino – drums (1, 4, 8, 12)
- Richard Reed Parry – EBow (1, 6), bass (1, 8), background vocals (12)
- Adam Schatz – keyboards (2, 3, 5–7, 9, 10), saxophone (2, 3, 5, 11, 12), synthesizer (6, 10, 12), bass clarinet (10)
- Steve Berlin – saxophone (2, 12)
- Kyle Crane – drums (3, 5–7, 10–12), percussion (11)
- Anna Butterss – bass (3, 5, 7, 10)
- Nora O'Connor – background vocals (3, 7)
- Jon Rauhouse – pedal steel guitar (5, 10, 12)
- Mark Cisneros – guitar (11)

== Charts ==
Chart performance for Neon Grey Midnight Green
Chart (2025)	Peak position
Scottish Albums (OCC)	81
UK Albums Sales (OCC)	65
UK Americana Albums (OCC)	15
UK Independent Albums (OCC)	24
US Americana/Folk Albums (Billboard)	19
US Independent Albums (Billboard)	49
US Top Album Sales (Billboard)	20
