= The Corn Sisters =

Canadian alternative country act

- Origin: Vancouver, British Columbia, Canada
- Genre: Alternative country
- Occupation: Singer-songwriter
- Years active: 1998–2002
- Label: Mint
- Past members: Neko Case; Carolyn Mark

The Corn Sisters were a Canadian alternative country act formed in Vancouver in 1998 as a side project by Neko Case and Carolyn Mark. Case had already released a solo album (The Virginian, 1997), while Mark had released six albums with her former band The Vinaigrettes.

== Career ==
The Corn Sisters built a reputation as "a dynamic touring duo" performing in coffee shops and other small venues before gaining wider exposure as the opening act for Richard Buckner. One of their coffee shop performances, recorded at Seattle's "Hattie’s Hat" in May 1998, was released as The Other Women by Mint Records in 2000 to mixed reviews, although Allmusic acknowledges its appealing "mix of twang and attitude". The pair contributed three songs between them to the label's Team Mint Volume Two sampler in 2001 – one as the Corn Sisters, one as Carolyn Mark and Her Roommates, and one as Neko Case and Her Boyfriends. They also contributed three tracks to the compilation A Tribute to the Soundtrack to Robert Altman's Nashville in 2002 – again, one as the Corn Sisters and one apiece as individuals. While Case and Mark stopped performing regularly as a duo in 2002, they did join Kelly Hogan to record the music for the 2004 documentary Lipstick and Dynamite.
