= The Other Women (album) =

Live album by The Corn Sisters
- Released: 2000
- Recorded: May 1998
- Label: Mint
- Producer: Erik Flannigan

Professional ratings
Review scores
Source	Rating
AllMusic	3/5 stars
Robert Christgau	(1-star Honorable Mention)

The Other Women is a 2000 album by The Corn Sisters, a duo consisting of Carolyn Mark and Neko Case.

The album was recorded live at Hattie's Hat in Seattle, Washington, in May 1998. The majority of the album consists of Carolyn Mark compositions and cover songs. The song "High On Cruel" had previously appeared on Case's debut solo album The Virginian, in 1997.

== Track listing ==
1. "Too Many Pills" (Carolyn Mark)
2. "Not a Doll" (Carolyn Mark)
3. "No More for You" (Ronnie Hayward)
4. "She's Leaving Town" (Dave Lang)
5. "Fist City" (Loretta Lynn)
6. "Matineed" (Carolyn Mark)
7. "Love Me" (Mike Stoller, Jerry Leiber)
8. "Long Black Veil" (Marijohn Wilkin, Danny Dill)
9. "Howling at Midnight" (Lucinda Williams)
10. "High on Cruel" (Neko Case)
11. "90 Miles an Hour (Down a Dead End Street)" (Hal Blair, Don Robertson)
12. "Don't Let Me Cross Over" (Penny Jay Moyer)
13. "Endless Grey Ribbon" (Nick Lowe)
14. "Corn on the Cob" (Carolyn Mark, Neko Case)
15. "This Little Light" (Traditional, arranged by Case & Marks)
16. "She's Leaving Town" (Alternate Version) (Dave Lang)
