= The Untamed Youth =

US musical group

- Origin: Columbia, Missouri
- Genres: Garage Rock, Surf Rock
- Years active: 1988–1993, 1996–1998
- Labels: Norton, Estrus, Double Crown Records
- Members: Derek Dickerson, Steve Mace, Steve Rager, Chris Sprague
- Past members: Chris Fletcher, F. Clarke Marty, Bobby Lloyd Hicks, Doug Walker, Joel Trueblood

The Untamed Youth were a mid-1980s garage rock band from Columbia, Missouri, United States, led by Deke Dickerson, who is best known as the frontman for Deke Dickerson & the Eccofonics. Original members (1986) were Deke Dickerson, Steve Mace, Doug Walker and Joel Trueblood (Alcohol Funnycar, Neko Case).

== History ==
The Untamed Youth first performed in Columbia at local club The Blue Note in January 1987, and quickly started playing locations throughout the United States between the years 1988–1993. The group disbanded in August 1993, but later reformed for reunion shows in 1995 including the Missouri Derby in Columbia, MO; Garage Shock in Bellingham, WA; and a European tour in 1996 and to record two studio albums for both the Estrus and Norton labels in 1997 and 1998 respectively.

== Style ==
The Youth were primarily a '60s-styled surf/frat rock band known for their wild stage antics such as spraying the audience with cans of beer during their song "Pabst Blue Ribbon" and for their self-deprecating sense of humor (most notably to be found on their last album for Norton, 'Youth Runs Wild'). All this, while holding a true reverence for their influences… ”the gods whose grooves they hammer home are the stars on a hundred forgotten 45's, their sacred texts "Surfin' Hearse" and "Go Go Ferrari." They're best live, but their Nineties LPs "Some Kinda Fun" and "More Gone Gassers" (Norton) surge with power; do not run other appliances when playing these in your home”. While their live shows were generally hard-edged, their albums are notably well-produced and arranged particularly their early Norton work, which was produced by Billy Miller of Norton Records and Andy Shernoff of The Dictators. These early Norton albums “capture(d) the supercharged atmosphere created whenever the Untamed Youth filled a teen club or tavern”.

== Novelty acts ==
The Untamed Youth was known for a variety of novelty acts including a Jello wrestling match, a fashion show, a pizza eating contest, and more. One such instance of this took place in the late 80s. When first starting out at the Blue Note in Columbia MO the band requested that the club owner let the band set up a Jello wrestling pit so that the bass player, Steve Mace, could spar with audience members during the show. They were given the green light and prepared gallons of cherry Jello. The concert went without incidents and the club owner had instructed them to dump the Jello on the ground by the dumpster. This was with the intention that the rain and sun would melt it away over time. When the Jello dried into the asphalt surrounding the dumpster it ended up looking like blood and the local Police Department we're called as they thought it might be connected to gruesome animal sacrifices that were taking place at the time. This is a setup for the type of energy and outlandish shows the Untamed Youth put on and were continued to be known for. During their song "Pabst Blue Ribbon", members of the band would spray the crowd with PBR cans.

== Legacy ==
Despite considerable local success and strong critical acclaim (including album reviews in Goldmine, Alternative Press, and Maximum Rock & Roll), the band followed many of their garage rock brethren into obscurity due to the (at the time) limited appeal of 1960’s retro music. However, as has often been the case with bands of this genre, the Youth gradually acquired a cult status as is evidenced by their reuniting recently for festivals in both the U.S. and Europe. The band's first albums, "Some Kinda Fun" and "More Gone Gassers" are now highly sought after collector’s items on vinyl.

== Current events ==
On July 27, 2024 and August 3, 2024, The Untamed Youth reunited for two weekends In California. This reunion consisted of Deke Dickerson, Steve Mace (King of Men), Steve “Sammy” Rager, and Chris “Sugarballs” Sprague. There was also a reunion of two of their original go-go dancers Jessica Daniel and Audrey Moorehead. When posting and advertising for the reunion show, Deke Dickerson made a post hinting at a new album work done between shows. As of now there has been no release information about the album or any other talk. During both shows, they performed the song "Pabst Blue Ribbon" where the audience in the front row was sprayed with PBR cans. The Untamed Youth are also scheduled to perform during the 2025 Little Steven's Underground Garage Cruise, departing from Miami, FL, along with the Hukilau Festival on June 5th-8th in Pompano Beach, FL.

== Band members by album ==
1989-Some Kinda Fun

- Derek Dickerson-guitar/lead vocals
- Steve Mace-bass guitar/vocals
- Chris Fletcher-organ/vocals
- F. Clarke Marty-drums/vocals

1990-More Gone Gassers From... The Untamed Youth

- Derek Dickerson-Guitars/Sax (on Beach Party)/lead vocals
- Steve Mace-bass guitar/vocals
- Steve Rager-organ/vocals
- F. Clarke Marty-drums/vocals

1992-The Untamed Youth ... Are The Sophisticated International Playboys

- Derek Dickerson-Guitars/lead vocals
- Steve Mace-bass guitar/vocals
- Steve Rager-organ/vocals
- Bobby Lloyd Hicks-drums/backing vocals

1994- "The Untamed Youth" - EP

- Derek Dickerson-Guitars/lead vocals
- Steve Mace-bass guitar/vocals
- Doug Walker- organ/vocals
- Joel Trueblood- drums

Note: Release of first recordings, from 1987.

1995- "Live from Fabulous Las Vegas Strip"

- Derek Dickerson- "Guitars/lead vocals"
- Steve Mace- "bass guitar/vocals"
- Trent Ruane- "organ/vocals"
- Dave Stuckey- "drums/vocals"

1997- "An Invitation to Planet Mace"

- Derek Dickerson- "Guitars/lead vocals"
- Steve Mace- "bass guitar/vocals"
- Steve Rager- "organ/vocals"
- Joel Trueblood- "drums"

1998- "Youth Runs Wild"

- Derek Dickerson- "Guitars/lead vocals"
- Steve Mace- "bass guitar/vocals"
- Steve Rager- "organ/vocals"
- Joel Trueblood- "drums"

== Discography ==
Year	Album	Record Company
1989	Some Kinda Fun	Norton
1990	More Gone Gassers from the Untamed Youth	Norton
1992	... Are The Sophisticated International Playboys	Norton
1995	Live from Fabulous Las Vegas Strip	Estrus
1997	An Invitation to Planet Mace	Estrus
1998	Youth Runs Wild	Norton
2002	Major Chaos!	Double Crown Records
