= Live from Austin, TX (Neko Case album) =

Live album by Neko Case
- Released: January 9, 2007
- Recorded: August 9, 2003
- Venue: University of Texas at Austin
- Studio: Studio 6A
- Genre: Alternative country
- Label: New West Records

Neko Case chronology
The Tigers Have Spoken (2004)	Live from Austin, TX (2007)	Middle Cyclone (2009)

Professional ratings
Review scores
Source	Rating
AllMusic	4/5 stars
Pitchfork	5.5/10
Rolling Stone	2.5/5 stars

Live from Austin, TX is a live album recorded by Neko Case on August 9, 2003, on the Austin City Limits Television series. The performance aired on PBS on November 8, 2003, was released on DVD in 2006, and appeared on compact disc on January 9, 2007. Aside from "Behind the House" and a cover of Bob Dylan's "Buckets of Rain," all songs appear on previous Case albums.

== Track listing ==
1. "Favorite" – 3:29
2. "Outro with Bees" – 1:24
3. "Behind the House" – 3:02
4. "Ghost Wiring" – 2:42
5. "Deep Red Bells" – 3:45
6. "Knock Loud" – 2:17
7. "Hex" – 4:46
8. "Maybe Sparrow" – 2:40
9. "Wayfaring Stranger" – 3:00
10. "Furnace Room Lullaby" – 2:54
11. "In California" – 3:20
12. "Buckets of Rain" – 2:48
13. "Look for Me (I'll Be Around)" – 3:25
14. "Alone and Forsaken" – 3:04
