= 2776 =

Studio album by Various Artists
- Released: July 4, 2014
- Genre: Comedy
- Producer: Rob Kutner, Joel Moss Levinson, Stephen Levinson

2776 is the second musical comedy album created and produced by Los Angeles based comedians Rob Kutner, Joel Moss Levinson, and Stephen Levinson. Released on July 4, 2014, 2776 features 28 tracks and over 80 celebrity performers. It's the story of the President in the year 2776 journeying through time to save America. The album also includes music videos for three songs: “Toymageddon,” “I’m Cured,” and “These Aren’t the Droids.” The album is a benefit for OneKid OneWorld.

== Track listing ==
No.	Title	Artist	Time
1	America, We're Good	Will Forte	2:34
2	Plot Song 1	Will Forte, Aubrey Plaza, Martha Plimpton	1:28
3	Escape From New York	Ashanti, Baron Vaughn, Andy Richter, Alonzo Bodden	2:40
4	Farewell California	Paul Myers	2:55
5	God Blessed America	Patton Oswalt, Bob Margolin	2:22
6	I'm Cured	Aimee Mann	2:52
7	Live It Now	Sklar Brothers	1:47
8	Mt. Rushmore	Al Jaffee, Dick Gregory, Dick Cavett, Joe Franklin, Margaret Cho, Marc Yaffee	4:02
9	Journey to Anywhen	Reggie Watts, Right Said Fred, Mayim Bialik	2:23
10	Welcome to America	Triumph the Insult Comic Dog, Rebirth Brass Band	2:59
11	Therapy Secession	Maria Bamford, Jonathan Katz	2:53
12	Forget the Alamo	Horatio Sanz, Brian Stack, Dave Hill	2:27
13	Plot Song 2	Will Forte, Aubrey Plaza, Martha Plimpton, Paul F. Tompkins	1:40
14	Party on Your Grave	Andrew W.K.	2:02
15	These Aren't the Droids	Neko Case, Kelly Hogan	3:33
16	Stop the Presses	Colton Dunn, Brandon Johnson, Zach Sherwin, Mike Mills	2:57
17	Battle of the Centuries	Will Forte, Paul F. Tompkins, Martha Plimpton, Basic Cable Band	2:56
18	(I Wanna) Take a Nap	Joel Moss Levinson	1:13
19	US v Rock n' Roll	Nina Totenberg, Dahlia Lithwick	3:37
20	Mole Lotta Love	Bobcat Goldthwait, Sally Timms	1:23
21	I Can Do It	Martha Plimpton	3:06
22	Toymageddon	Yo La Tengo, Ira Glass, Eugene Mirman	3:51
23	Ooh I Love That Girl (PS I'm a Zombie)	Miguelito	1:35
24	Bunker Bunker, Burning Love	Ed Helms	2:49
25	Aliens, Robts & Viruses	Apple Sisters	0:44
26	Not What the Founders Intended	Paul F. Tompkins, Eric Johnson	3:34
27	Canada—Up On Top Again	Mark McKinney, Scott Thompson, Bruce McCulloch, Will Arnett, Samantha Bee, Cobie Smulders, Alex Trebek, Steven Page, Craig Northey	3:26
28	Finale	Will Forte, Paul F. Tompkins, Martha Plimpton	3:23

== Videos ==
- “Toymageddon” (2013)
- “I’m Cured” (2014)
- “These Aren’t the Droids” (2014)

== Reception ==
2776 has been written about in USA Today, GQ, The A.V. Club, and other publications. Its liner notes, written by George Saunders, were featured in The New Yorker.

== See also ==
- These Aren't The Droids You're Looking For
