= The Worse Things Get, the Harder I Fight, the Harder I Fight, the More I Love You =

Studio album by Neko Case
- Released: September 3, 2013
- Genre: Alternative rock; country
- Length: 38:14
- Label: Anti-
- Producer: Tucker Martine

Neko Case chronology
Middle Cyclone (2009)	The Worse Things Get, the Harder I Fight, the Harder I Fight, the More I Love You (2013)	case/lang/veirs (2016)

Professional ratings
Aggregate scores
Source	Rating
AnyDecentMusic?	7.8/10
Metacritic	84/100
Review scores
Source	Rating
AllMusic	4.5/5 stars
The A.V. Club	C
Chicago Tribune	3.5/4 stars
The Guardian	4/5 stars
Los Angeles Times	3/4 stars
MSN Music (Expert Witness)	A−
NME	8/10
Pitchfork	8.2/10
Rolling Stone	4/5 stars
Spin	8/10

The Worse Things Get, the Harder I Fight, the Harder I Fight, the More I Love You is the sixth studio album by American musician Neko Case. It was released on September 3, 2013 under Anti Records. The album was nominated for Best Alternative Music Album at the 56th Annual Grammy Awards.

== Track listing ==
All tracks are written by Neko Case, except where noted.

The Worse Things Get, the Harder I Fight, the Harder I Fight, the More I Love You track listing
No.	Title	Writer(s)	Length
1.	"Wild Creatures"		2:39
2.	"Night Still Comes"		3:47
3.	"Man"	Case, Paul Rigby	3:31
4.	"I'm from Nowhere"	Case, Rigby	3:01
5.	"Bracing for Sunday"		2:18
6.	"Nearly Midnight, Honolulu"		2:37
7.	"Calling Cards"	Case, Rigby	2:36
8.	"City Swans"	Case, Rigby	4:08
9.	"Afraid"	Nico	2:20
10.	"Local Girl"		2:36
11.	"Where Did I Leave That Fire?"		3:27
12.	"Ragtime"	Case, Rigby	5:14
Total length:			38:14

Deluxe edition bonus tracks
No.	Title	Writer(s)	Length
13.	"Madonna of the Wasps"	Robyn Hitchcock	3:46
14.	"Magpie to the Morning"		2:56
15.	"Yon Ferrets Return"	Case, A. C. Newman	1:16

== Personnel ==
Primary musicians

- Neko Case – vocals (1–15), backing vocals (1–3, 5–7, 10, 11), guitar (1, 3, 5, 14), tambourine (3, 8, 10), jingle bells (10), percussion (15)
- Kelly Hogan – backing vocals (1–3, 5–7, 10)
- Jon Rauhouse – electric guitar (1, 2, 5, 7, 11, 12), pedal steel guitar (1, 5), acoustic guitar (4, 8), banjo (11, 14), trombone (12), Hawaiian guitar (14)
- Paul Rigby – electric guitar (1–3, 5, 7, 8, 10–12), acoustic guitar (1, 5, 7, 8), twelve-string guitar (10)
- Tom V. Ray – bass (1–3, 5, 7, 8, 10–12, 14)

Additional musicians

- Eric Bachmann – backing vocals (15)
- Steve Berlin – MIDI saxophone (1, 2), baritone saxophone (2, 5, 9, 12), flute (5, 11)
- Carl Broemel – electric guitar solo (8) and autoharp (9)
- Joey Burns – cello (2, 8, 10, 12), baritone guitar (10), bass (11)
- Tracyanne Campbell – vocals (6)
- John Convertino – drums (5, 7, 10–12)
- Kurt Dahle – drums (1–3, 5, 8, 12)
- Rachael Flotard – backing vocals (1–3, 5, 6, 10)
- Howe Gelb – organ (13), synth (13)
- Tom Hagerman – violin (10), viola (10)
- Jim James – backing vocals (2)
- Bo Koster – piano (1–3, 7, 8, 11, 12), organ (1, 5, 10, 12), Mellotron (1), bass organ (1), synth (2, 8, 12), keyboards (3), Melodeon (7), Wurlitzer (7), Clavinet (8), vibes (9, 11)
- Tommy Larkin – drums (13)
- Nick Luca – bass (13), guitar (13)
- Carolyn Mark – backing vocals (14)
- A. C. Newman – backing vocals (2, 6, 12), guitar (15)
- Marc Ribot – piano (9)
- Craig Schumacher – chimes (10)
- Chris Schultz – sonar samples (11)
- Steve Turner – electric guitar (1, 3)
- Jacob Valenzuela – trumpet (7, 12)
- M. Ward – electric guitar (2, 3, 10), vocals (13)
- Martin Wenk – trumpet (7, 12)

== Charts ==
Chart performance for The Worse Things Get, the Harder I Fight, the Harder I Fight, the More I Love You
Chart (2013)	Peak position
Belgian Albums (Ultratop Flanders)	115
Canadian Albums (Billboard)	8
Dutch Albums (Album Top 100)	99
UK Albums (OCC)	63
US Billboard 200	12
US Independent Albums (Billboard)	1
