= Hell-On =

Studio album by Neko Case
- Released: June 1, 2018
- Studios: Carnacial Singing, St. Johnsbury, Vermont; Ingrid, Stockholm, Sweden; WaveLab, Tucson, Arizona
- Genre: Alternative country
- Length: 52:44
- Label: Anti-
- Producers: Neko Case, Björn Yttling

Neko Case chronology
case/lang/veirs (2016)	Hell-On (2018)	Wild Creatures (2022)

Singles from Hell-On
- 1. "Bad Luck" Released: 2018

Hell-On is the seventh studio album by American singer-songwriter Neko Case, released by record label Anti- on June 1, 2018. It was largely recorded in Stockholm, and Case co-produced six of the album's twelve tracks with Björn Yttling of Peter Bjorn and John.

== Overview ==
The album was recorded during a tumultuous period in Case's life. Already dealing with serious problems caused by obsessed stalkers, her farmhouse residence in Vermont was destroyed in a fire while she was in Sweden working on the album, leaving her homeless. Recording and being away from home during this time helped her not dwell on these problems and allowed her to focus her energy on something positive.

Case promoted the album by touring with Ray LaMontagne.

== Cover art ==
Fans and critics have speculated that the fire in the album's cover art represents the fire that destroyed Case's Vermont home, but she has said this was actually completely coincidental. Inspired by the popular HBO series Game of Thrones, she wanted to craft a family sigil, saying: "I decided that my background was so trashy that my family crest would probably have a cigarette butt on it. But I was also obsessed with fake Hollywood cigarettes, so I thought it would be funny to make a costume out of what looked like burning cigarettes."

== Critical reception ==
Professional ratings
Aggregate scores
Source	Rating
AnyDecentMusic?	7.9/10
Metacritic	85/100
Review scores
Source	Rating
AllMusic	4.5/5 stars
The A.V. Club	A
Chicago Tribune	3.5/4 stars
The Guardian	5/5 stars
The Independent	4/5 stars
Mojo	3/5 stars
Pitchfork	7.7/10
Q	4/5 stars
Rolling Stone	4/5 stars
Vice	B+

Hell-On received universal acclaim from critics. On Metacritic, which assigns a normalized rating out of 100 to reviews from mainstream publications, it has an average score of 85 based on 22 reviews.

In his review for AllMusic, critic Mark Deming praised the album, writing: "With Hell-On, Case has once again given herself an ideal showcase for her talents as a vocalist, songwriter, and producer; it's lush but intimate, and one of the strongest and most satisfying records she's delivered to date. Which, given her catalog, says a great deal."

== Accolades ==
Publication	Accolade	Rank	Ref.
The A.V. Club	Top 20 Albums of 2018	2	
Albumism	Top 50 Albums of 2018	16	
Entertainment Weekly	Top 20 Albums of 2018	12	
God Is in the TV	Top 50 Albums of 2018	9	
PopMatters	Top 70 Albums of 2018	25	
Uncut	Top 75 Albums of 2018	12	

== Track listing ==
All tracks are written by Neko Case and Paul Rigby, except where noted.

No.	Title	Writer(s)	Length
1.	"Hell-On"		4:11
2.	"Last Lion of Albion"	Case, Rigby, Jeff Galegher	3:38
3.	"Halls of Sarah"		3:53
4.	"Bad Luck"		3:59
5.	"Curse of the I-5 Corridor"		7:01
6.	"Gumball Blue"	Case, Allan Carl Newman	4:14
7.	"Dirty Diamond"		3:44
8.	"Oracle of the Maritimes"	Case, Laura Veirs	4:25
9.	"Winnie"		3:54
10.	"Sleep All Summer"	Eric Bachmann	5:04
11.	"My Uncle’s Navy"	Case, Newman	4:14
12.	"Pitch or Honey"		4:27
Total length:			52:44

== Personnel ==
- Neko Case – vocals, backing vocals, guitar, kalimba, tambourine, clave, piano
- Paul Rigby – electric guitar, acoustic guitar, 12-string guitar
- Mark Lanegan – duet vocals on "Curse of the I-5 Corridor"
- Eric Bachmann – guitar, duet vocals on "Sleep All Summer", piano
- Rachel Flotard, k.d. lang, Kelly Hogan, Laura Veirs, Nora O'Connor, Robert Forster, Kathryn Calder, Carl Newman, Joe Seiders, Beth Ditto – backing vocals
- Doug Gillard – guitar, harpsichord
- Sebastian Steinberg – autoharp, electric bass
- Joey Burns – upright bass, cello, bass, piano, wurlitzer, pump organ, synthesizer, vibraphone
- Barbara Gruska – drums, percussion, drum machine
- Jeff Galegher – kalimba loop sample, guitar
- Björn Yittling – keyboards, bass, guitars
- Steve Berlin – saxophone
- Thom Monahan – tambourine, tuba
- Tucker Martine - engineer
- Tobias Tagesson – drums
- Simi Stone – violin, backing vocals
- John Collins – synthesizer
- Chris Schultz – soundscape, space echo loop
- Matt Chamberlain – drums, percussion
- Tom V. Ray – bass
- Jon Rauhouse – guitar, pedal steel
- Dan Hunt – drums, percussion
- Sandy Schwoebel – bass flute
- Kyle Crane – tambourine

== Charts ==
Chart (2018)	Peak position
Australian Albums (ARIA)	88
Dutch Albums (Album Top 100)	123
New Zealand Heatseeker Albums (RMNZ)	4
Scottish Albums (Official Charts)	38
US Billboard 200	31
US Americana/Folk Albums (Billboard)	2
US Independent Albums (Billboard)	4
US Top Alternative Albums (Billboard)	4
US Top Rock Albums (Billboard)	5
