= Robyn Cage =

American singer-songwriter

- Born: Robyn Kemp
- Origin: Park City, Utah, United States
- Genres: Pop, adult alternative
- Occupations: Singer, songwriter, pianist
- Instruments: Piano, vocals
- Years active: 2010–present
- Website: http://www.robyncage.com

Robyn Kemp, known by her stage name Robyn Cage, is an American singer, songwriter, and pianist from Park City, Utah.

== Career ==
Cage earned her BFA in Musical Theater from Boston Conservatory at Berklee. After graduation, Cage worked as an actress in New York City for five years, where her performances have earned praise from The New York Times and Variety (magazine). She has appeared with Sean Astin in The Freemason, Steven Segal in Code of Honor, and in the Hallmark Channel films My Christmas Love (2016) and Love In The Limelight.

In 2010, Robyn moved backed to Utah, changed her last name from Kemp to Cage, and worked with two time Grammy-nominated producer Darryl Neudorf and Grammy-nominated and Juno Award-winning producer Dan Burns on her debut album, Born in the Desert released in October 2015. The album was named one of the 35 Top Albums of 2015 by I’m Music Magazine and topped the list of 25 Best New Music Critiques of 2015 by Music Connection Magazine.

On February 16, 2018 Cage released her second album, Slow the Devil, which was named Best Indie Album of 2018 by Scorpius Magazine.

Cage has performed at Boston's Symphony Hall and the Utah Music Awards. In 2023, she joined Brit Floyd as a backing vocalist, performing with them at Red Rocks Amphitheater, Austin City Limits, and on their Pulse Live 2024 PBS Special. Her music has received exclusive video premieres on Baeble Music, GroundSounds, Live in Limbo and placements in MTV Italia's 16 and Pregnant, and the Top 10 box office Tyler Perry feature film Nobody's Fool, starring Whoopi Goldberg and Tiffany Haddish.

She is currently developing her original musical, "BLACK FRIDAY, The Musical!"

== Discography ==
=== Studio albums ===
Title	Details
Lovers & Monsters	Year: 2022; Label: Robyn Cage; Format: Digital Download
A Million Years of Stone	Year: 2022; Label: Robyn Cage; Format: Digital Download
Slow The Devil	Year: 2018; Label: Robyn Cage; Format: Digital Download, Physical CD, Vinyl
Born in the Desert	Year: 2015; Label: Robyn Cage; Format: Digital Download, Physical CD
Born in the Desert (Deluxe)	Year: 2015; Label: Robyn Cage; Format: Digital Download, Physical CD

=== Singles ===
Title	Year	Details	Album
"Warrior" (Single)	2020		Slow The Devil
"Fallout" (Single)	2018	Song by Robyn Cage, produced by Caleb Loveless	Slow The Devil
"This Means War" (Single)	2017		Slow The Devil
"Slow The Devil" (Single)	2017		
"Larger Than Life" (Single)	2015	Song by Robyn Cage and Cari Cole; Song Produced by Dan Burns	Born in the Desert, Born in the Desert (deluxe)
"Burning Now" (Single)	2014		Born in the Desert, Born in the Desert (deluxe)
'Burning Now (acoustic)" (Single)	2014		

=== Remixes ===
Title	Year
"Fallout" (Wyatt Schmidt Remix)	2018
"Fallout" (Jarryd Wark Remix)	2018
"Slow the Devil" (Wyatt Schmidt Remix)	2017
"Larger Than Life" (Planetaries version)	2015
"Burning Now" (Kristin Royal Cinematic Remix)	2015
"Burning Now" (The Planetaries Remix)	2014

=== Extended plays ===
Title	Year	Details
Tales of a Thief (EP)	2014	Vocals and Piano: Robyn Cage; Vocal Arranging: Cari Cole
Raining Sideways (EP)	2010	Released under name Robyn Kemp

=== Music videos ===
Title	Year	References
"Warrior"	2020	
"Fallout"	2018	
"Slow The Devil"	2017	
"Burning Now"	2014	
"Theatre Noir"	2015	
"Larger Than Life"	2015	
"Born in the Desert"	2015	
"The Arsonist & The Thief "	2016	
