= The Tigers Have Spoken =

Live album by Neko Case
- Released: November 9, 2004
- Recorded: March–April 2004
- Genre: Alternative country
- Length: 34:15
- Label: Anti-
- Producers: Neko Case and Darryl Neudorf

Neko Case chronology
Blacklisted (2002)	The Tigers Have Spoken (2004)	Fox Confessor Brings the Flood (2006)

Professional ratings
Aggregate scores
Source	Rating
Metacritic	80/100
Review scores
Source	Rating
AllMusic	4/5 stars
Blender	3.5/5 stars
Entertainment Weekly	A
Mojo	4/5 stars
Paste	4.5/5 stars
Pitchfork	7.6/10
Rolling Stone	3/5 stars
Stylus	B+
Uncut	8/10
Under the Radar	7/10

The Tigers Have Spoken is a 2004 live album by Neko Case. The album was recorded at several live shows in Chicago and Toronto in the spring of 2004. Neko's backing band featured The Sadies and Jon Rauhouse. Guest performers included Carolyn Mark, Kelly Hogan, Jim & Jennie and the Pinetops, Paul Morstad and Brian Connelly. The album was produced by Case and Darryl Neudorf.

The album consists of a combination of Case originals and cover songs such as the Nervous Eaters' "Loretta", The Shangri-Las' "The Train From Kansas City", and Loretta Lynn's "Rated X".

For the recording of Wayfaring Stranger, Neko Case enlisted the help of the 300+ audience at the 2004 ideaCity conference in Toronto during her presentation, the group performance of which she captured on tape. The crowd sang along and can be heard to great effect in the song's chorus.

== Track listing ==
1. "If You Knew" – 2:30 - (Neko Case, Sadies)
2. "Soulful Shade of Blue" – 2:33 - (Buffy Ste. Marie)
3. "Hex" – 4:59 - (Catherine Ann Irwin)
4. "The Train from Kansas City" – 3:25 - (Jeff Barry, Ellie Greenwich)
5. "The Tigers Have Spoken" – 2:41 - (Case, Sadies)
6. "Blacklisted" – 2:11 - (Case)
7. "Loretta" – 2:09 - (Steve Cataldo)
8. "Favorite" – 3:36 - (Case)
9. "Rated X" – 2:49 - (Loretta Lynn)
10. "This Little Light" – 3:00 - (Traditional)
11. "Wayfaring Stranger" – 3:16 - (Traditional)
12. "Tigers Are Noble" – 1:07 (hidden track)
