= The Whistle Only Dogs Can Hear =

Studio album by Kelly Hogan
- Released: 1996
- Genre: Country rock, torch songs
- Label: Long Play
- Producer: Kelly Hogan (coproducer)

Kelly Hogan chronology
| The Whistle Only Dogs Can Hear (1996) | Beneath the Country Underdog (2000) |

The Whistle Only Dogs Can Hear is the debut album by the musician Kelly Hogan, released in 1996. Vic Chesnutt said that Hogan's version of his song "Soft Picasso" was his favorite of the many covers of his songs, despite it not appearing on Sweet Relief II: Gravity of the Situation.

== Production ==
Hogan wrote just two of the album's 15 songs; she cowrote others with former Jody Grind bandmate Bill Taft. The album includes covers of Toussaint McCall's "Nothing Takes the Place of You", Vic Chesnutt's "Soft Picasso", and Palace Brothers' "King Me". The album was recorded in Atlanta, and coproduced by Hogan.

"All Is Well" is about the death of Robert Hayes, one of the two Jody Grind bandmembers killed in a 1992 car accident.

== Critical reception ==
Professional ratings
Review scores
| Source | Rating |
|---|---|
| AllMusic | 4/5 stars |
| Chicago Tribune | 3.5/4 stars |

Trouser Press called The Whistle Only Dogs Can Hear "a casual and sincere record that presents [Hogan] as a versatile, confident, personable singer and ... songwriter." Rolling Stone wrote that "Hogan casts her luscious phrasing against sinewy guitars that often jut out or distort, enriching the groove... The music rocks with the agility of mini-Morricone soundtracks." The Chicago Tribune determined that "Hogan has every bit of the showboating vocal power of a Whitney or an Alanis; the difference is she knows how to sculpt a song and build a moment rather than simply flatten it."

The Atlanta Journal-Constitution stated: "Juxtaposing ballads and romps, slick countryfied guitar licks and low-fi ruckus, Whistle resists settling into too steady a groove." The San Jose Mercury News' Claudia Perry listed the album as the sixth best of 1996, writing that, "while the likes of Gwen Stefani (No Doubt) and Shirley Manson (Garbage) were hogging media attention, Hogan made an album of girl talk about trouble and love that blows any of those young carpers out of the water." Miami New Times, in 1999, considered the album to be "one of the great overlooked long-players of the past few years."

AllMusic called the album "an eclectic collection of country-tinged torch songs and down-tempo rockers that highlight her warm, brassy voice."

== Track listing ==
| No. | Title | Length |
|---|---|---|
| 1. | "Dirty vs. Clean" |
| 2. | "Waiting" |
| 3. | "Arms" |
| 4. | "Do Right" |
| 5. | "Soft Picasso" |
| 6. | "Lucky Nights" |
| 7. | "Dirtclod" |
| 8. | "Map" |
| 9. | "I Am Getting Better." |
| 10. | "Nothing Takes the Place of You" |
| 11. | "The Idea of You" |
| 12. | "King Me" |
| 13. | "Feel Good Hit" |
| 14. | "Blue Magic" |
| 15. | "All Is Well" |
