= Canadian Amp =

2001 EP by Neko Case

EP by Neko Case
- Released: 2001
- Recorded: 2001
- Genre: Alternative country
- Length: 23:33
- Label: Lady Pilot Records
- Producer: Neko Case

Neko Case chronology
Furnace Room Lullaby (2000)	Canadian Amp (2001)	Blacklisted (2002)

Professional ratings
Review scores
Source	Rating
Allmusic	3/5 stars

Canadian Amp is a 2001 EP by Neko Case.

The recording features Case performing four covers of material by Canadian songwriters, along with a Hank Williams cover, a traditional folk song and two original songs written by Case (one of which was in collaboration with The Sadies).

Guest musicians include Andrew Bird, Jon Rauhouse, Kelly Hogan, Brett Sparks and Chris Von Sneidern.

The disc was originally a tour-only release; however, it later received wider circulation.

== Track listing ==
1. "Andy" (Mike O'Neill) – 1:40
2. "Dreaming Man" (Neil Young) – 3:46
3. "Knock Loud" (Sook-Yin Lee) – 3:08
4. "Make Your Bed" (Case, The Sadies) – 3:15
5. "Poor Ellen Smith" (Traditional) – 2:17
6. "In California" (Lisa Marr) – 3:29
7. "Alone and Forsaken" (Hank Williams) – 2:42
8. "Favorite" (Case) – 3:17

== Personnel ==
- Andrew Bird – Violin
- Neko Case – Vocals, electric and acoustic tenor guitars, producer, engineer, mixing, photography, drawing, recording
- Mike Hagler – Producer, engineer, mastering
- Kelly Hogan – Vocal harmony
- Andy Hopkins – Guitar (acoustic), guitar (electric)
- Jon Rauhouse – Guitar (acoustic), banjo, engineer, Hawaiian guitar, pedal steel banjo, recording
- Tom Ray – Bass (upright), banjo-ukulele
- Brett Sparks – Vocals
- Chris Von Sneidern – Guitar (12 string acoustic)
