= The Unforgiving Sounds of Maow =

Studio album by Maow
- Released: 1996
- Recorded: 1995–1996
- Genre: Punk
- Length: 20:21
- Label: Mint
- Producer: Maow

Maow chronology
I Ruv Me Too (1995)	The Unforgiving Sounds of Maow (1996)

Professional ratings
Review scores
Source	Rating
Allmusic	2.5/5 stars

The Unforgiving Sounds of Maow is a 1996 album by Vancouver punk band Maow. It was the band's only full-length album, 21 minutes in length.

The album is notable primarily for being Neko Case's debut as a lead vocalist, although her loud, punk-rock singing on this project is not typical of her later style. On the album, Case shares lead vocal duties with bandmates Tobey Black and Corrina Hammond.

Many of the songs are about partying. The album's best-known song, "Ms. Lefevre", celebrates the character "Renee Lefebvre" from Woody Allen's movie What's New Pussycat? A music video was created to publicize the song.

The album also includes covers of songs by Wanda Jackson ("Mean Mean Mean") and Nancy Sinatra ("How Does That Grab You?").

== Critical reception ==
Jim Smith compared the group's style to early work by the Go-Gos. The Washington City Paper called the album "unexceptionable". Robert Kaups at AllMusic gave the album a mixed review. Michael Panontin of Canuckistan praised "Ms. Lefevre".

== Track listing ==
1. "Wank" – 1:41
2. "Mean Mean Man" – 0:59 - Wanda Jackson
3. "Sucker" – 1:51
4. "Ms. Lefevre" – 1:52
5. "Rock 'N' Roll Boy" – 1:12
6. "Very Missionary" – 1:09
7. "Mommie's Drunk" – 1:32
8. "Woman's Scorn" – 1:30
9. "Showpie" – 1:09
10. "J'ai faim" – 0:39
11. "Man What's Got a Gun" – 1:05
12. "How Does That Grab You?" – 2:01 - Nancy Sinatra
13. "Party Tonite!" – 0:54
14. "Cat's Meow" – 0:43
15. "One Nite Stand" – 1:01
16. "Catastrophie" – 1:03
