= The Virginian (album) =

Studio album by Neko Case and her Boyfriends
- Released: 1997
- Recorded: 1996–1997
- Genre: Alternative country
- Length: 30:31
- Label: Mint/Bloodshot
- Producer: Brian Connelly

Neko Case and her Boyfriends chronology
The Virginian (1997)	Furnace Room Lullaby (2000)

The Virginian is the 1997 debut studio album by American vocalist Neko Case, whose backing band at that time consisted of a rotating group of musicians referred to as "Her Boyfriends". It was Case's first solo record after previously being a member of Vancouver pop punk bands Maow and Cub.

Guest musicians on the album include Carl Newman, Carolyn Mark, Rose Melberg, Matt Murphy, Brian Connelly, and Darryl Neudorf. Case and Newman would later form the New Pornographers with other Vancouver musicians.

The song "Karoline" was a re-recording of the song "Rebecca Lash" which Case had written and recorded with her previous band Maow. "Misfire" is a cover of a Queen song, originally recorded on the band's Sheer Heart Attack album. "Duchess" was originally recorded by its writer Scott Walker on the 1969 album Scott 4.

A video for "Timber" was shot; however, CMT did not air it, calling it too dark. Case herself was unhappy with the video and did not want it aired.

== Critical reception ==
Professional ratings
Review scores
Source	Rating
AllMusic	3/5 stars
Pitchfork	7.3/10

The Globe and Mail wrote that Case "comes across like a latter-day Brenda Lee, warbling about bluegrass and honky-tonks as if she'd been raised on them, filling her songs with inventive word play, heartbreak and humour while refugees from bands such as Sloan, Copyright and Zumpano bang out their best impersonation of 1950s Nashville session guys."

== Track listing ==
1. "Timber" – 2:45 (Neko Case, Brad Lambert, Eric Napier)
2. "Bowling Green" – 2:16 (Terry Slater, Jacqueline Ertel)
3. "Jettison" – 3:13 (Case, Ford Pier)
4. "High on Cruel" – 2:02 (Case, David Carswell)
5. "Karoline" – 2:24 (Case, Carswell)
6. "Lonely Old Lies" – 3:34 (Case, Lambert, Napier, Carl Newman)
7. "Honky Tonk Hiccups" – 2:22 (Matt Murphy)
8. "The Virginian" – 3:29 (Case, Lambert, Napier, Newman)
9. "Duchess" – 2:55 (Scott Engel)
10. "Thanks a Lot" – 2:35 (Eddie Miller, Don Sessions)
11. "Somebody Led Me Away" – 2:46 (Lola Jean Dillon)
12. "Misfire" – 2:10 (John Deacon)
