= Blacklisted (Neko Case album) =

Studio album by Neko Case
- Released: August 20, 2002
- Recorded: 2002
- Genres: Alternative country; americana
- Length: 37:18
- Label: Bloodshot
- Producer: Craig Schumacher

Neko Case chronology
Canadian Amp (2001)	Blacklisted (2002)	The Tigers Have Spoken (2004)

Singles from Blacklisted
- 1. "I Wish I Was the Moon" Released: 2002

Blacklisted is the third studio album by American musician Neko Case, released on August 20, 2002.

Blacklisted marked a departure from the alternative country sounds of Case's first two solo albums. Guest musicians on the album include Howe Gelb, Kelly Hogan, Mary Margaret O'Hara, Joey Burns, John Convertino, and Dallas Good.

As of 2009, sales in the United States have exceeded 113,000 copies, according to Nielsen SoundScan.

== Music ==
Nick A. Zaino III of Paste assessed the style present on Blacklisted: "[Case's] persona and her music remained dark, mysterious, and a little distant with her voice wrapped in reverb as if she were calling out from a vast, empty space. If Tom Waits is the drunken dreamer caught in the gutter, Case is the woman who put him there. And unlike some of her contemporaries, she never gave up on twang as she developed her own voice."

== Critical reception ==
Professional ratings
Aggregate scores
Source	Rating
Metacritic	82/100
Review scores
Source	Rating
AllMusic	4.5/5 stars
The Austin Chronicle	4/5 stars
Blender	3/5 stars
Chicago Sun-Times	3.5/4 stars
Entertainment Weekly	A−
Pitchfork	7.9/10
Rolling Stone	3/5 stars
The Rolling Stone Album Guide	4/5 stars
Spin	8/10
Uncut	4/5 stars

Upon original release, Blacklisted was met with critical applause, with particular praise towards Case's vocals. AllMusic's Mark Deming wrote that it contained "some of her finest and most insightful performances to date", as well as noting her progressions as a lyricist and composer. Eric Carr for Pitchfork echoed this, dubbing her vocals "dense with emotional heft and more richly expressive" than her previous work in power pop collective the New Pornographers. Carr also applauded the backing musicians, calling their contributions "roundly excellent and evocative".

== Legacy ==
Blacklisted has continually earned praise in recent years, with critics applauding the results that came from Case's then-newfound artistic control. In a 20th anniversary review, Spectrum Culture's Susan Darlington saw it show Case "at her sharpest and most fearless", writing that its songs' "confidence… [are] so great that it makes the listener wonder why it took her so long to take sole writing credits." In another retrospective review, Stereogum's Rachel Brodsky saw it announce Case "forging her own country-noir sound", noting its "then-new" qualities such as "pioneering" genre fusion and more. Brodsky wrote of "legions of younger artists" who would try to replicate Blacklisted's sound in the years since its release.

In 2016, Exclaim!'s Sarah Greene ranked the album second out of five essential Case records. She called its songs "decadently dark and beautifully scary, providing a sympathetic backdrop for [her] torchy performances." In 2020, Consequence ranked it the best of Case's nine solo works.

Pitchfork placed Blacklisted at number 141 on their list of top 200 albums of the 2000s.

== Track listing ==
All songs written by Case, except where noted.

1. "Things That Scare Me" (Case, Tom Ray) – 2:30
2. "Deep Red Bells" – 4:03
3. "Outro with Bees" – 1:35
4. "Lady Pilot" – 2:26
5. "Tightly" – 2:16
6. "Look for Me (I'll Be Around)" (Sylvia Dee, Guy Wood) – 3:21
7. "Stinging Velvet" – 2:55
8. "Pretty Girls" – 3:25
9. "I Missed the Point" – 1:52
10. "Blacklisted" – 2:22
11. "I Wish I Was the Moon" – 3:34
12. "Runnin' Out of Fools" (Richard Ahlert, Kay Rogers) – 3:05
13. "Ghost Wiring" – 3:54
14. "Outro with Bees (Reprise)" – 2:24

== Personnel ==
Credits sourced from Blacklisted's liner notes.

- Neko Case - vocals (tracks: 1 to 7, 9 to 13), harmony vocals (2); acoustic guitar, electric tenor guitar (2 to 4, 7, 8, 10), tambourine (2, 11), piano (5), acoustic tenor guitar (5, 9, 11, 13), electric 6-string guitar & saw (8), electric guitar (10), drums & percussion (12); arrangement (tracks: 2, 8, 11)
- Kelly Hogan - sexy background vocals (track: 12)
- Mary Margaret O'Hara - backing & harmony vocals (track: 13)
- Dallas Good - 12-string guitar (track: 1), baritone guitar (2, 12), electric & acoustic guitar (9)
- Joey Burns - tenor guitar & pump organ (track: 1), acoustic guitar 1, 6, 11, 12), cello (3, 8, 13), bowed double bass (4), electric bass (4, 11), electric guitar & acoustic guitar (5), vibraphone (5, 6), accordion (11), upright bass (6, 12)
- Brian Connelly - baritone guitar (track: 5)
- Jon Rauhouse - banjo (tracks: 1, 8, 13), pedal steel guitar (2, 4, 6, 7, 10 to 13), Hawaiian guitar (9)
- Howe Gelb - pump organ (track: 3), piano (3, 10, 12), organ (4, 6, 12), Wurlitzer organ (10)
- Tom V. Ray - upright bass (tracks: 2, 5, 7 to 10, 13); arrangement (tracks: 2, 8)
- John Convertino - drums (tracks: 1, 2, 4 to 10, 13)
