= Devil in a Woodpile =

Chicago-based musical group, jug band

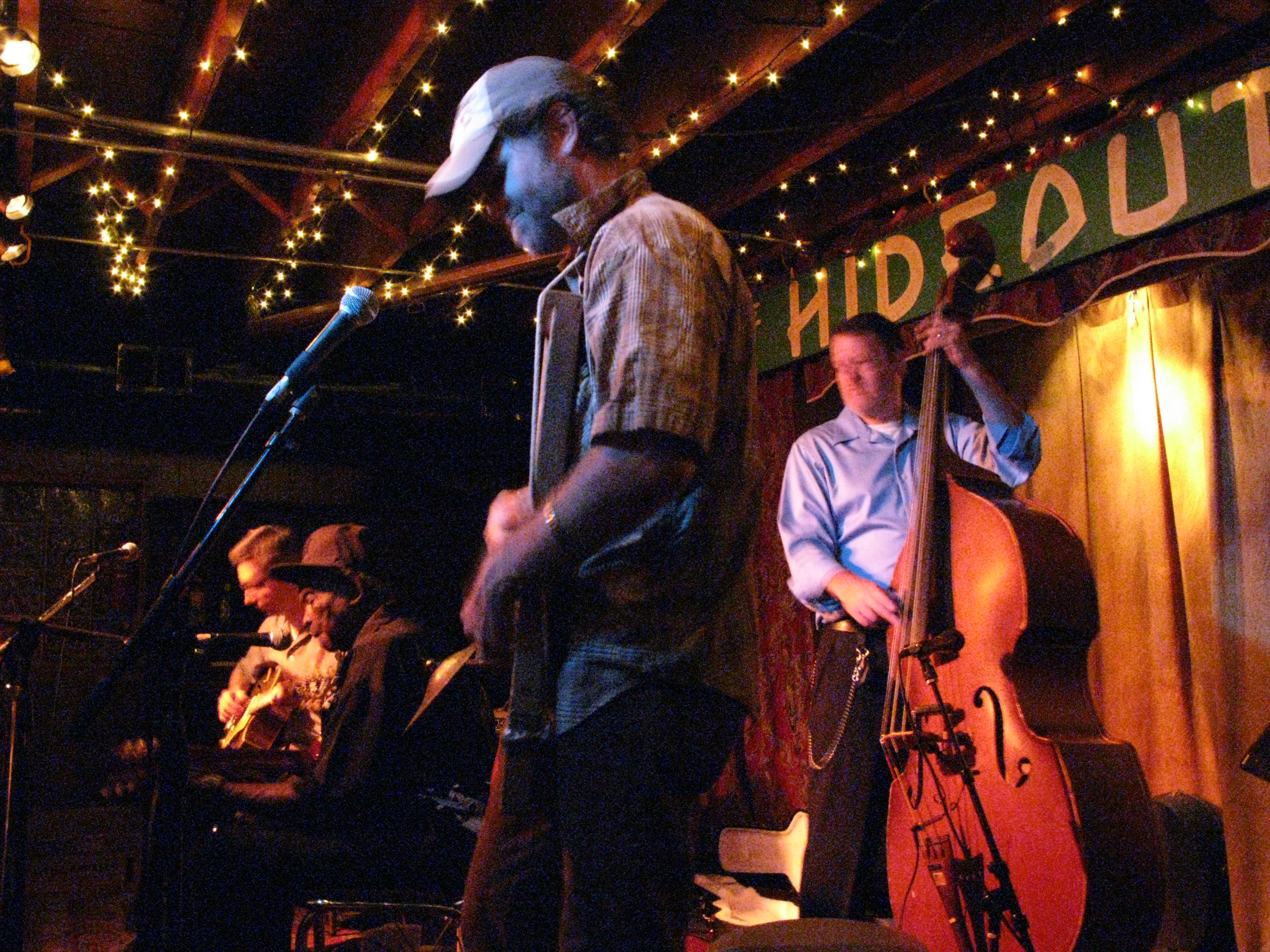
- Devil in a Woodpile on stage at the Hideout, playing with David Honeyboy Edwards

Background information
- Origin: Chicago, Illinois, United States
- Genres: Alt country Country rock
- Label: Bloodshot Records
- Members: Rick "Cookin" Sherry, Joel Paterson, Beau Sample
- Past members: Paul Kaye, Mike Grenz, Tom Ray, Gary Schepers
- Website: devilinawoodpile.com

Devil in a Woodpile is a band from Chicago, Illinois. Although they routinely give a fresh sound to 80-year-old songs, their repertoire and instrumentation categorizes them as a country blues or jug band.

== History ==
Rick Sherry and Tom V. Ray first began playing together in the early 1990s as part of the Jake LaBotz Trio. After this unit broke up, the group began backing David "Honeyboy" Edwards, and performed as Devil in a Woodpile in between sets. The band first won acclaim locally in Chicago by playing frequent gigs at The Hideout. Signing with local folk/country label Bloodshot Records, the group released its first album in 1998 and a second in 2000. Soon after this they toured with Son Volt in the USA. Adding Madison, Wisconsin native Joel Paterson to the lineup in 2003, the group released its third record for Bloodshot in 2005. Gary Schepers (tuba) or Beau Sample (bass) often play with the band when Tom Ray is not available.

In the summer of 2007, the group opened for the folk legend Ramblin' Jack Elliott in Cleveland.

After more than ten years playing their weekly Tuesday slot at the Hideout, the group disbanded in 2009. That year, Rick Sherry joined with guitarist Eric Noden and bassist Beau Sample to form a new group, the Sanctified Grumblers. This group plays in the same style, and eventually took over the old Hideout residency. Sherry has since re-reformed Devil in a Woodpile with Joel Paterson on guitar, banjo and kazoo, and Beau Sample on upright bass and jug. In 2015, Devil in a Woodpile/Sanctified Grumblers was inducted into the Jug Band Hall of Fame.

== Music ==
For the most part, Devil in a Woodpile perform cover tunes, playing and recording their own interpretation of an eclectic range of old songs. Their repertoire stretches from blues, jazz and ragtime, to traditional folk songs and some country influences. Their own compositions follow the same pattern. While performing with blues legend, David Honeyboy Edwards has a more laid back sound. On their most recent album, In Your Lonesome Town, they cover a Charlie Patton song "Shake It and Break It" as well as Led Zeppelin's "Bron-Y-Aur Stomp."

== Members ==
Beau Sample, Rick Sherry and Joel Paterson playing on the front porch of the Hideout on June 7, 2018.

Current members

- Rick "Cookin" Sherry - vocals, harmonica, jug, clarinet, washboard, other percussion
- Beau Sample - upright bass
- Joel Paterson - guitar, vocals (Joel also plays with The Western Elstons and under his own name with the Joel Paterson Trio)

Former members

- Paul Kaye - steel guitar
- Tom V. Ray - upright bass
- Gary Schepers - tuba
- Mike Grenz - upright bass

== Discography ==
- Devil in a Woodpile (Bloodshot, 1998)
- Division Street (Bloodshot, 2000)
- In Your Lonesome Town (Bloodshot, 2005)

=== Compilation contributions ===
- "Got Just What I Want" (Trad.) - For A Decade of Sin: 11 Years of Bloodshot Records (Bloodshot, 2005)
