= Maow =

Canadian indie rock band

- Also known as: Meow
- Origin: Vancouver, British Columbia, Canada
- Genres: Indie rock, cuddlecore
- Years active: 1994–1997
- Labels: Mint, Twist Like This
- Past members: Neko Case; Tobey Black; Corrina Beesley-Hammond

Maow was a Canadian indie rock band from Vancouver, British Columbia, Canada. A pop punk combo, the band was part of the "cuddlecore" scene led by Cub.

Maow consisted of guitarist/singer Tobey Black, bassist/singer Corrina Beesley-Hammond, and drummer/singer Neko Case, who had been with Cub.

== History ==
The band came together in 1994, when Americans Case and Beesley-Hammond, who had been at art school together (at what is now Emily Carr University of Art and Design), joined with Black, also an American who was studying in Vancouver. Their original name was 'Meow'; they changed it when a New York band of the same name objected. They played their first gig in the backyard of the 'House of Rock', where its residents, members of The Smugglers, held events such as the 'Debut-B-Q'. When Maow performed, neighbours called the police. The police attended, and watched the concert.

In 1994, Maow entered 'Shindig', a band contest hosted by the University of British Columbia radio station CITR-FM, and became the first female band to win. (Discorder Magazine called it a "travesty of musical justice" because Maow was "Really bad".) As a result of the win, the band was given recording time at Mushroom Studios; Beesley-Hammond recalled that Heart had just finished recording and their lipstick was still on the microphones. While recording, they found their musicianship rapidly improving.

Maow released a six-song EP, I Ruv Me Too! on the independent Texas record label Twist Like This, which was owned by Beesley-Hammond's brother. Also in 1995, the band was signed to Vancouver's Mint Records (which is co-owned by Beesley-Hammond's now-husband, Kevin Beesley, guitarist for The Smugglers and the Beauticians).

In June 1996, they released their full-length album, The Unforgiving Sounds of Maow. The album had two cover songs and fourteen original tracks, the best known of which was "Ms. Lefevre". Where they had previously not taken themselves seriously, with the release of the album, they took a more professional approach and started touring. They opened for The Phantom Surfers in San Francisco, they played the Horseshoe Tavern in Toronto, and numerous Canadian venues in between. With outlandish costumes, a cheeky sense of humour and a tomboy attitude, their media attention increased and they were asked to go on a US tour with the punk rock band The Hanson Brothers. But when the bands arrived at the American border together, Maow misrepresented their reason for crossing into the US. Both bands were denied entry and their instruments were seized. The tour was cancelled, resulting in a significant loss of revenue for both bands, and for Virgin Records.

Maow toured across Canada with the Hanson Brothers but the three women found that touring was unhealthy and stressful. Beesley-Hammond went into footwear design. Case moved back to the US and went on to a solo career as an alternative country star and sometime vocalist with Canadian power pop ensemble The New Pornographers. In 2001, Black joined the indie rock band The Gay.

== Discography ==
- 1995 I Ruv Me Too!
- 1996 The Unforgiving Sounds of Maow
