= Furnace Room Lullaby =

Studio album by Neko Case and Her Boyfriends
- Released: February 22, 2000
- Recorded: 1998–1999
- Genre: Alternative country
- Length: 36:20
- Label: Mint
- Producer: Neko Case, Darryl Neudorf

Neko Case and Her Boyfriends chronology
The Virginian (1997)	Furnace Room Lullaby (2000)	Canadian Amp (2001)

Professional ratings
Review scores
Source	Rating
AllMusic	4/5 stars
The Austin Chronicle	4/5 stars
Entertainment Weekly	A
The Guardian	4/5 stars
NME	7/10
Pitchfork	8.2/10
Q	4/5 stars
The Rolling Stone Album Guide	4/5 stars

Furnace Room Lullaby is the second studio album by Neko Case and Her Boyfriends, released in February 2000, on Mint Records.

Said Case of the title track at a performance at Austin City Limits in 2003, "I wanted to write a murder ballad, simply because I was such a huge fan of the Louvin Brothers. Not that this song is anywhere as good as a Louvin Brothers song, but I tried."

Guest musicians on the album include Scott Betts, Brian Connelly, Bob Egan, Dallas Good and Travis Good, Kelly Hogan, Evan Johns, Kevin Kane, Don Kerr, Linda McRae, Darryl Neudorf, Carl Newman, Ford Pier, John Ramberg, Henri Sangalang, Ron Sexsmith and Joel Trueblood.

The title track was included on the soundtrack to Sam Raimi's film The Gift.

== Track listing ==
No.	Title	Writer(s)	Length
1.	"Set Out Running"	Neko Case & Local Rabbits	3:00
2.	"Guided by Wire"	Scott Betts, Case, John Ramberg, Joel Trueblood	3:21
3.	"Porchlight"	Case, Brian Connelly, Don Kerr, Ron Sexsmith	3:35
4.	"Mood to Burn Bridges"	Betts, Case, Connelly, Trueblood	2:53
5.	"No Need to Cry"	Case, Connelly	2:16
6.	"Twist the Knife"	Ryan Adams, Case, Mike Daly, Ramberg	2:34
7.	"Thrice All American"	Betts, Case, Connelly, Ramberg, Trueblood	3:13
8.	"We've Never Met"	Case, Kerr, Sexsmith	2:52
9.	"Whip the Blankets"	Betts, Case, Connelly, Trueblood	2:43
10.	"South Tacoma Way"	Betts, Case, Connelly, Trueblood	4:51
11.	"Bought and Sold"	Case, Ramberg	2:09
12.	"Furnace Room Lullaby"	Case, Travis Good	2:53

== Personnel ==
Credits sourced from Furnace Room Lullaby's liner notes.

Neko Case & Her Boyfriends

- Neko Case - vocals, harmony vocals (12); tambourine (tracks: 1, 2, 9)
- John Ramberg - backing vocals (2, 4, 6, 7, 9, 11); electric guitar (1, 2, 4, 6, 7, 9, 11), baritone guitar (4, 9)
- Brian Connelly - baritone guitar (1, 5), electric guitar (3), guitar (5, 11)
- Darryl Neudorf - acoustic guitar (12)
- Scott Betts - bass (1, 2, 4, 6, 7, 9, 10)
- Joel Trueblood - drums (1, 2, 4, 6, 7, 9, 10)

=== Guest musicians ===
- Kelly Hogan - backing vocals (1, 3, 10), spooky ooh's (12)
- Travis Good - baritone guitar (1), electric guitar (1, 2, 4, 6, 10, 12), acoustic guitar (1, 2, 6, 7, 9, 10), mandolin (1, 10), tenor guitar (2, 7), fiddle (8, 10), 8-string guitar (12), upright bass (12)
- Evan Johns - guitar solo (1), electric guitar (4, 6), steel guitar (7)
- Ron Sexsmith - vocals (8); acoustic guitar (3, 8)
- Bob Egan - lap steel & National Reso-Phonic guitars (3), pedal steel guitar (8)
- Kevin Kane - 12-string guitar solo (6)
- Dallas Good - guitar (11)

== Chart positions ==
Chart (2000)	Peak position
Canadian RPM Country Albums	27
