= Visqueen (band) =

American power pop/punk rock band

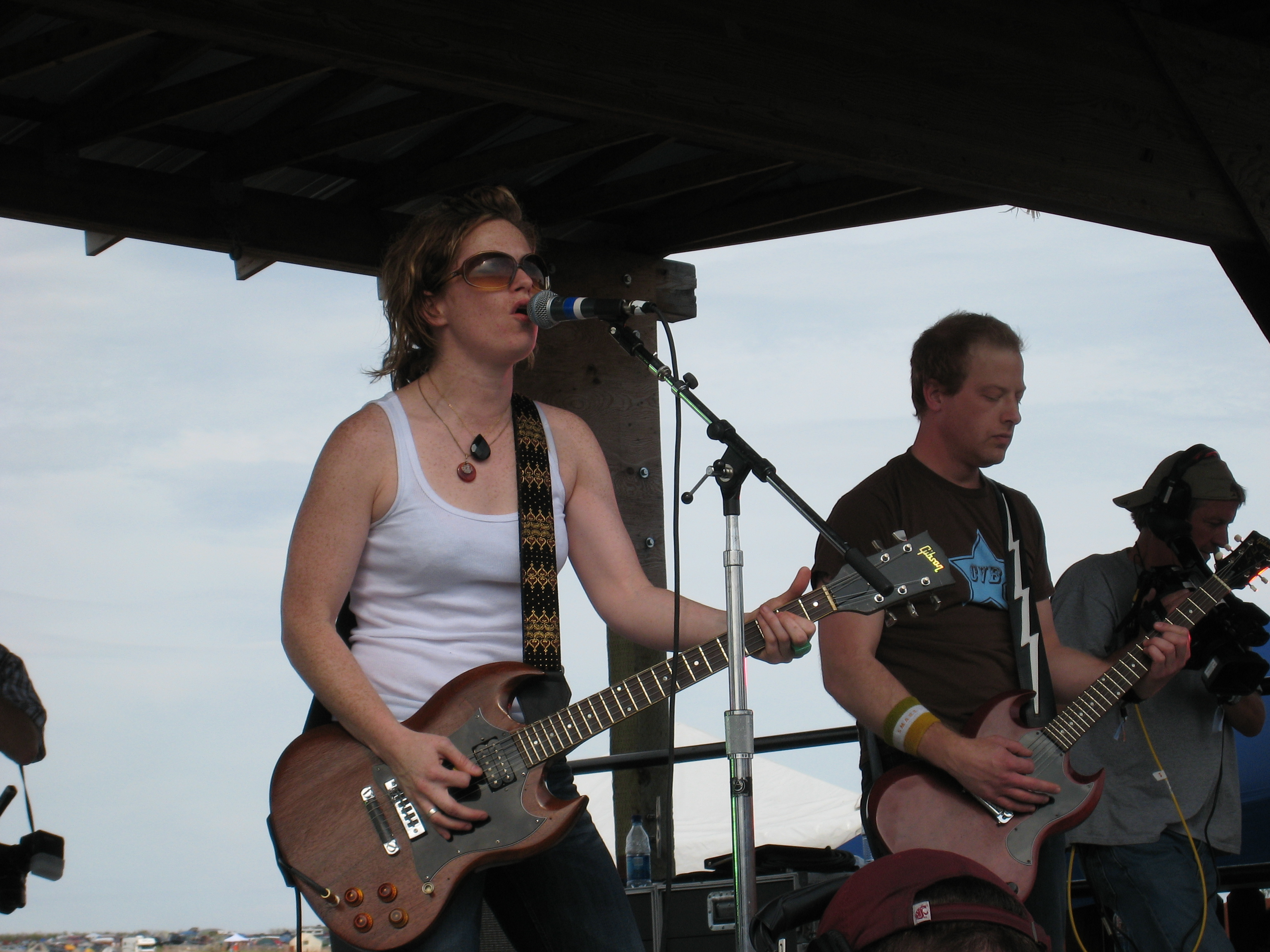
- Visqueen performing at the 2007 Sasquatch Festival

Background information
- Origin: Seattle, Washington, United States
- Genres: Pop punk, power pop, indie rock
- Years active: 2001–2011
- Labels: Local 638 Records
- Members: Rachel Flotard, Cristina Bautista, Ben Hooker.
- Past members: Kim Warnick (bass), Ronnie Barnett (bass – of The Muffs), Bill Coury (bass), Barrett Jones (bass), Allan Ross (guitar), Tom Cummings (guitar).
- Website: www.visqueenonline.com

Visqueen is an American power pop/punk rock band from Seattle, Washington, United States, formed in 2001. It is named after a brand of polyethylene film that United States Secretary of Homeland Security Tom Ridge once recommended as a defense against bioterrorism.

The band's original members were singer-songwriter-guitarist Rachel Flotard and drummer Ben Hooker, both formerly of Hafacat; Allan Ross (guitar; left in November 2001), and Kim Warnick, formerly of the Fastbacks. Warnick retired at the end of 2004, but Muffs co-founder Ronnie Barnett signed on to play the bass during the band's 2005 tour. Early in 2006, Bill Coury, formerly of Once For Kicks & Sourmash, joined the band as bassist, and later Tom Cummings, formerly of Once For Kicks and Sourmash, joined the band as a second guitarist. Late in 2006, Bill Coury left the band and by spring 2007, Barrett Jones, producer (Foo Fighters, The Presidents of the United States of America), joined Visqueen as bassist.

Their current bassist is Cristina Bautista. Bautista also played bass in Connecticut Four, from Bellingham, Washington, and in 2006 put out a solo EP, This Is the Team.

Flotard has performed as backup singer in support of Neko Case and Jon Rauhouse, a pedal steel guitar player and multi-instrumentalist who often tours with Case.

Visqueen's third album, Message to Garcia, was released in 2009 on Flotard's own label, Local 638 Records, named for the labor union that Flotard's late father belonged to.

Flotard used to write an advice column for Seattle-based online publication Three Imaginary Girls called "Love Is Hard with Rachel Flotard."

Flotard was featured on Minus the Bear's song "Into the Mirror" from their album Omni.

Visqueen played what were announced as their final shows in 2011, with a farewell show at the Neptune Theater in November of that year. On November 28, 2016, after a five-year hiatus, Visqueen reunited as Flotard, Hooker, and Bautista for a live show at the Crocodile Lounge in Seattle as the opening act for X. Visqueen returned once again to play Tractor Tavern on November 17, SMOOCH Fest on December 3, a and The Vera Project on December 9, 2022.

== Discography ==
- King Me, BlueDisguise Records BD002, February 25, 2003
- Sunset on Dateland, BlueDisguise Records BD007, September 21, 2004
- Message to Garcia, Local 638 Records, September 15, 2009
