= Carolyn Mark =

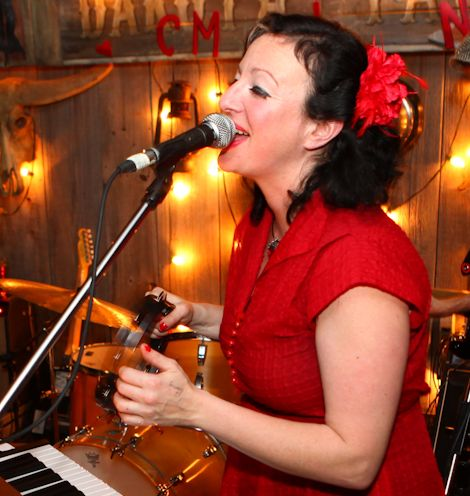
- Mark in 2009

Background information
- Origin: Sicamous, British Columbia, Canada
- Genres: Alternative country
- Occupations: Musician, songwriter
- Years active: 1993–present
- Label: Mint
- Website: carolynmark.com

Carolyn Natasha Mark is a Canadian alternative country singer-songwriter. She has recorded as a solo artist and as a member of the duo The Corn Sisters with American colleague Neko Case, as well as with the bands the Vinaigrettes, Jr. Gone Wild, Showbusiness Giants, the Fixin's and the Metronome Cowboys. She has also provided backing vocals on recordings by The Buttless Chaps, Greenfield Main, Neko Case, Frog Eyes, NQ Arbuckle, Rhubarb Whiskey, Secret Emchy Society, and Blackout Beach.

In 2006, Mark performed on CBC Radio One's Fuse in collaboration with the band Great Lake Swimmers, a collaboration which Mark herself described as "like putting a scorpion and a mouse in a tank together and seeing what happens".

In 2009 she co-released Let's Just Stay Here with Toronto's NQ Arbuckle through Vancouver's Mint Records. The album was nominated for a 2010 Juno Award, in the Roots & Traditional Album category. The album was also one of PopMatters' top 10 album in their Best Country Music of 2009 list. In September 2016, Mark released her eighth solo album, Come! Back! Special!

== Discography ==
- At Home on Tour (1999, with Tolan McNeil)
- Party Girl (2000)
- The Other Women (2000, with Neko Case)
- Terrible Hostess (2002)
- The Pros and Cons of Collaboration (2004)
- Just Married: An Album of Duets (2005)
- Nothing Is Free (2007)
- The Sound of the Tone / Echoes from the Last Resort (2009, with Tolan McNeil)
- Let's Just Stay Here (2009, with NQ Arbuckle)
- The Queen of Vancouver Island (2012)
- Come! Back! Special! (2016)
- Off Season (2022)
