= Tom V. Ray =

American bassist living in Chicago (born 1965)

Tom V. Ray is an American bassist living in Chicago. He was born in 1965, and grew up on a farm in Vincennes, Indiana.

Ray's professional musical career began in 1983, when he began performing with local bluegrass, country and classic rock cover bands. In 1990 he moved to New Orleans to join French Quarter legends Augie Jr. and the Big Mess Blues Band. During this time he met the iconic bluesman Willie Dixon, who gave him a lesson in slap bass technique. Ray toured in Europe for a year with the Big Mess Blues Band following the release of its self-titled debut album in 1990.

Subsequently, Ray moved to Chicago and began collaborations with many of that city's leading musical lights, including Uncle Tupelo’s Jeff Tweedy and Jay Farrar, Jon Langford of the Mekons, the performance artist Brigid Murphy, and Poi Dog Pondering’s Frank Orrall. In 1991 he started the Chicago underground jug band Devil in a Woodpile with Rick Sherry, and in 1993 co-founded the Bottle Rockets with Brian Henneman. Ray was also a founding member of the Langford-helmed combos the Waco Brothers and the Pine Valley Cosmonauts.

From 1997 to 2008 Ray was the first chair Chapman Stick player with the Blue Man Group of Chicago at the Briar Street Theater. Since 1999 he has been a member of Neko Case’s band, which he continues to tour and record with, contributing to such releases as Case's 2009 Grammy-nominated album Middle Cyclone. Ray's first solo album, featuring the musician on ukulele, has been scheduled to appear in the fall of 2010.
