= Darryl Neudorf =

- Born: June 7, 1964 (age 62); Saskatoon, Saskatchewan, Canada
- Origin: Vancouver, British Columbia, Canada
- Genres: Post-Punk, Indie-Rock, Alternative, Synth-Pop, Electronica, Alt-Country, Americana, Ambient
- Occupations: Drummer, record producer, audio engineer, teacher
- Instrument: Multi-Instrumentalist
- Years active: 1982–present
- Website: www.darrylneudorf.com

Darryl Neudorf is a Canadian musician, record producer, audio engineer and teacher.

== Biography ==
=== Early life ===
Darryl was born in Saskatoon, Saskatchewan, Canada. His family moved to Kelowna, British Columbia, Canada when he was five-years-old.

In 1979, at the age of fifteen, he became the drummer for a post-punk collective called Empty Set. The band consisted of his kid sister/vocalist Adele Neudorf, bassist John Brotherton and classmate/guitarist Kevin Kane.

=== 54-40 ===
At eighteen Neudorf moved to Vancouver and joined 54-40 as their drummer. He was with the band from 1982 to 1985.

Neudorf recorded two albums with 54/40 and toured extensively in North America with them up until his departure. The songs that Neudorf performed, co-composed and produced with 54/40 achieved gold and platinum status in Canada.

He is best known during this time for co-writing the hit song "I Go Blind" which was covered by U.S. rock group Hootie and the Blowfish. The song was also featured on the NBC sitcom "Friends" in 1995 and was also included on the "Friends" soundtrack album which led to increased exposure for 54-40 and the song becoming a Billboard Top 10 hit.

In 1985, after three years in the band, Neudorf left 54-40 to pursue a career in music production.

=== Early production career ===
Later that year, Darryl moved to Toronto and in 1986 he started working at a computer based music studio called Q.E.D. Media which featured a Fairlight C.M.I. and a Waveterm PPG 2.

In 1986, Neudorf also filled in as a drummer on a tour with Moev, an electronic synth-pop band, composed of Tom Ferris, Cal Stephenson, Michaela Arrichiello and Nettwerk Productions co-founder Mark Jowett.

During that tour in Halifax, Nova Scotia, a band called the October Game opened for Moev. The singer for that band was Sarah McLachlan. It was this encounter that eventually led to Nettwerk signing Sarah and launching her career.

In 1987, Mark Jowett asked Darryl to work on the Sarah McLachlan project for Nettwerk Productions. This recording, the album Touch, resulted in garnering the interest of Arista Records. She signed a multi-album contract with them and two of the songs that Neudorf worked on with her became commercial hits in Canada. In 1991, Neudorf was invited back to work with McLachlan on her second album, Solace.

In 1993, he filed a lawsuit against McLachlan and her label, Nettwerk, alleging that he had made a significant and uncredited contribution to the songwriting on Touch, and alleging that he wasn't paid properly for work done on Solace. The judge in this suit eventually ruled in McLachlan's favour on the songs; though Neudorf may have contributed to the songwriting, neither regarded each other as joint authors. The judge ruled in Neudorf's favour on the payment issue.

=== Miller Block ===
In 1994, in Vancouver's Downtown Eastside, Darryl Neudorf and Tracy Pillsworth met with Tom Anselmi of the band Copyright. The three met on the top floor of a building (built in 1948) through Jim Carrico who had found the Hastings Street space for lease. An artists' co-operative was about to burgeon and become home to a group of people generating dozens of CDs and vinyl representing Vancouver's eclectic underground. Neudorf and Pillsworth lent Anselmi their recording equipment to record what was to become Copyright's second CD, Love Story. The building of a recording studio that was soundproofed and secure followed. The studio was named after the arched words "Miller Block", painted in gold on the front of the building's black and green tiled facade.

Throughout the 1990s, Neudorf managed and operated Miller Block with Pillsworth (aka Sugarpill), where he did much of his recording and production. This work resulted in scores of releases in a wide variety of genres including post-punk, indie-rock, alternative rock, synth-pop, avant-garde electronica, alt-country, Americana, ambient and dub. Among others, this list includes Neko Case, Herald Nix, Cub, Superconductor, The New Pornographers, Kevin Kane, Duotang (band), Bughouse 5, I Am Spoonbender, Twilight Circus Dub Sound System, Tippy Agogo, The Lottie Collins, Randy Bachman, Jello Biafra, Wimpy Roy, Faust, Propeller, Dead Voices on Air. The merging of equipment, space and trust surrounding Miller Block resulted in a creative studio environment that flourished for six years, until the Fall of 2000.

During the Summer of 1998, Darryl performed at Edgefest with Copyright (band), playing keyboards throughout the tour.

Neudorf embarked on an American tour with Dead Voices On Air and Not Breathing in 1999, playing drums.

In 2000, Darryl went on tour throughout Europe playing drums and keyboards with Dead Voices on Air (DVOA), supporting Michael Rother and Dieter Moebius.

=== Relocation ===
In 2001, Neudorf, Pillsworth and the boxed up studio moved to Toronto, Ontario. Shortly thereafter, they settled in the Oak Ridges neighbourhood of Richmond Hill, on the shores of Lake Wilcox, a kettle lake. Neudorf continued to produce and engineer successful recordings, among others, Americana singer Neko Case, The Sadies, Justin Rutledge, Jim Bryson, Carrie Clark and the Lonesome Lovers, Benjamin Regan, The Mohawk Lodge, By Divine Right and Darlings Of Chelsea.

=== The Audio Recording Academy ===
During 2002 Darryl Neudorf was asked by Shannon Murray to become the head instructor at, and design the curriculum for, a new audio production school located in downtown Toronto called The Audio Recording Academy (TARA). Neudorf remained head instructor until 2008 when, during an indefinite leave, he passed the batton over to producer / engineer Damon de Szegheo, who took over teaching duties.

=== Operation Northwoods Recording Services ===
In November 2004, Neudorf and Pillsworth moved to a creative retreat in the Hills of Headwaters region of Ontario, in the rural community of Mono, north of Toronto. The residential recording studio was on a large forested property, in an outbuilding, on a farm.

The studio was called Operation Northwoods Recording Services, where musicians recorded with Neudorf at the helm, with him either producing, mixing, engineering, drumming and/or mastering. Among others, these musicians include Neko Case, Blue Rodeo, The Grapes of Wrath, Barzin, Two Hours Traffic, Absent Sound, The Terror Jets, Modern Space, Language Arts, Catherine Maclellan, Jill Barber, Matthew Barber, Jim Cuddy, David Myles (musician), Ashleigh Semkiw, Laura Jean, Lily Frost, Lindi Ortega, Robyn Cage, Tyler Kealey, David Storey, Graham Maycock, Erin Bolton, PorkRoyalty, Traditionally Wound, Brementown Players, David Robert King, Scott Helman, Elliott Brood, Locas in Love and The Weather Station.

In 2010, Darryl engineered a soundtrack with Greg Keeler for the film Gunless.

=== Primalux ===
Neudorf relocated to his home town of Kelowna, British Columbia, Canada in 2019, just before the arrival of Covid. He did some mixing during that time for Amy Annelle, Cayley Thomas, Oxlip, Little Jane and the Pistol Whips, and The Muster Point Project. However, most of his studio remained boxed up until October 2024, until Neudorf and Pillsworth discovered a property near Okanagan Lake, close to the Sibell Maude-Roxby Wetlands Boardwalk. Here, they founded Primalux Studio and Institute of Music and Technology, within a building that allowed Darryl to put together a Dolby 7.1.4 immersive mixing environment.

== Awards ==
| Title | Award | Credit | Date |
| Sarah McLachlan - Touch | CRIA Certified Canadian Gold | Co-Composer, Pre-Production | 1991 |
| Sarah McLachlan - Solace | CRIA Certified Canadian Platinum | Pre-Production | 1991 |
| 54/40 - Sweeter Things | CRIA Certified Canadian Platinum | Co-Composer, Co-Producer, Performer | 1995 |
| I Go Blind | ASCAP Award | Co-Composer | 1998 |
| The New Pornographers - Mass Romantic | Juno Award - Alternative Album of the Year | Engineer | 2001 |
| Neko Case - Middle Cyclone | Grammy Nomination - Best Contemporary Folk Album | Co-Producer / Engineer | 2009 |
| I Go Blind | SOCAN Classic Award | Co-Composer | 2009 |
| Blue Rodeo - The Things We Left Behind | CRIA Certified Canadian Platinum | Recording and Mixing Engineer | 2010 |
| Neko Case and Blue Rodeo | Juno Nomination | Engineer of the Year | 2010 |
| Neko Case and Blue Rodeo | Juno nomination | Engineer of the Year | 2010 |
| Neko Case - The Worse Things Get The Harder I Fight The Harder I Fight The More I Love You | Grammy Nomination - Best Alternative Album | Co-Producer / Engineer | 2013 |
| Jill Barber - Chances | CRIA Certified Canadian Gold | Mix Engineer | 2019 |
| I Go Blind | Canadian Songwriter’s Hall of Fame | Inductee | 2021 |
