= Neko Case =

American singer-songwriter (born 1970)

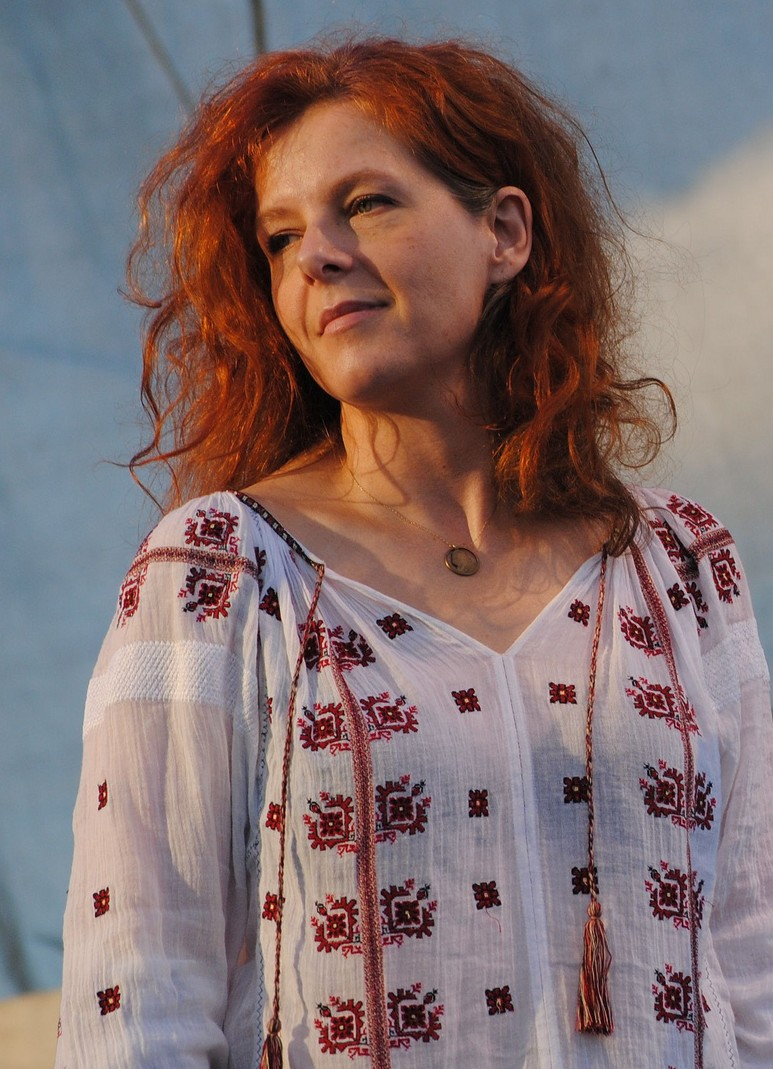
- Case at the 2012 Forecastle Festival in Louisville, Kentucky.

Background information
- Born: Neko Richelle Case; September 8, 1970 (age 56); Alexandria, Virginia
- Origin: Tacoma, Washington
- Genres: Indie rock; alternative country; folk rock; Americana
- Occupations: Musician, singer-songwriter
- Instruments: Vocals; percussion; piano; guitar; tenor guitar
- Years active: 1994–present
- Labels: Lady Pilot; ANTI-; Mint; Bloodshot; Matador; Loose Music
- Website: NekoCase.com

Neko Richelle Case (/ˈniːkoʊ ˈkeɪs/ NEE-koh KAYSS; born September 8, 1970) is an American singer-songwriter and member of the Canadian indie rock group the New Pornographers. Case's singing voice has been described by contemporaries and critics as a "flamethrower", her "powerhouse [voice] seems like it might level buildings," "a 120-mph fastball," and a "vocal tornado". Critics also note her idiosyncratic, "cryptic," "imagistic" lyrics, and credit her as a significant figure in the early 21st-century American revival of the tenor guitar. Case's body of work has spanned and drawn on a range of traditions including country, folk, art rock, indie rock, and pop and is frequently described as resisting classification.

== Early life ==
Born in Alexandria, Virginia, Case is the only child of James Bamford Case. Case's maternal family surname was originally Shevchenko; her great-aunt was the professional wrestler Ella Waldek. Her father, an airman serving in the United States Air Force, was based in Virginia at the time of her birth. Case's parents, who were teenagers when they had her, are of Ukrainian ancestry. Her parents divorced when Case began school. In her memoir, Case indicated that she was told that her mother died of cancer when she was in the second grade, but only two years later, she was told that this was not correct. After that, her mother flitted in and out of her life, and eventually Case cut ties with her mother for good. As she writes in the book, she had a revelation: "Perhaps her mother had never been sick at all."

Case's family relocated several times during her childhood due to her stepfather's work as an archaeologist. She lived in Western Massachusetts, Vermont, Oregon and Washington. She considers Tacoma, Washington to be her hometown.

By the age of 18 she was performing as a drummer for the Del Logs and the Propanes, playing in venues including a punk club called the Community World Theater.

== Music career ==
=== Vancouver ===
In 1994, Case moved to Vancouver, British Columbia, to attend the Emily Carr Institute of Art and Design, leaving without a degree in 1998. While in Vancouver, she played drums in several local bands, including the Del Logs, the Propanes, the Weasels, Cub, and Maow. These bands were, for the most part, local punk groups. Case said of the vibrant Vancouver punk rock scene at that time, "A lot of women wanted to play music because they were inspired, because it was an incredibly good time for music in the Northwest. There was a lot of clubs, a lot of bands, a lot of people coming through, a lot of all-ages stuff—it was a very exciting time to live there."

In 1998, she left Canada for Seattle, Washington. Before going, Case recorded vocals for a few songs that ended up on Mass Romantic, the New Pornographers' first album. Her lead vocals on songs like "Letter from an Occupant" are straightforward, full-volume power-pop performances, shedding any country elements. Released on November 28, 2000, Mass Romantic became a surprise success. Although the band was originally conceived as a side project for its members, the New Pornographers remain a prominent presence in the indie rock world, having released their tenth album in 2026.

In addition to recording with the New Pornographers, Case collaborates with other Canadian musicians, including the Sadies and Carolyn Mark, and has recorded material by several noted Canadian songwriters, in particular on her 2001 EP Canadian Amp. As a result, she is also considered a significant figure in Canadian music—both CBC Radio 3 and the Society of Composers, Authors and Music Publishers of Canada have referred to Case as an "honourary [sic] Canadian". In 2018 Case performed at the Vancouver Folk Music Festival.

=== Seattle ===
Case embraced country music on her 1997 album, The Virginian. The album contained original compositions as well as covers of songs by Ernest Tubb, Loretta Lynn and the 1974 Queen song "Misfire". When the album was released, critics compared Case to honky-tonk singers like Lynn and Patsy Cline, and to rockabilly pioneer Wanda Jackson, particularly in her vocal timbre.

On February 22, 2000, Case released her second solo album, Furnace Room Lullaby. The album introduced the country noir elements that have defined Case's subsequent solo career. That tone was evident even from the cover photo, featuring Case sprawled out corpse-like on a concrete floor.

Case sometimes tours with Canadian singer and songwriter Carolyn Mark as the Corn Sisters. One of their performances, at Seattle's Hattie's Hat restaurant in Ballard, was recorded and released as an album, The Other Women, on November 28, 2000.

=== Chicago ===
In October 1999, around the time Furnace Room Lullaby was released, Case left Seattle for Chicago because she felt that Seattle was no longer hospitable to its local artists.

Case's first work in Chicago was an eight-song EP that she recorded in her kitchen. Canadian Amp, her first recording without Her Boyfriends, was released on her own Lady Pilot label in 2001. She wrote two of the tracks, with the remaining six being covers, including Neil Young's "Dreaming Man" and Hank Williams' "Alone and Forsaken". Four of the covers were written by Canadian artists. The EP was initially available only at Case's live shows and directly from Mint Records' website, but it eventually saw wider release.

Case also recorded her third full-length album, Blacklisted, while living in Chicago.

In April 2003, Case was voted the "Sexiest Babe of Indie Rock" in a Playboy.com internet poll, receiving 32% of the vote. Playboy asked her to pose nude for the magazine, but she declined their offer. She told Entertainment Weekly that

I didn't want to be the girl who posed in Playboy and then—by the way—made some music. I would be really fucking irritated if after a show somebody came up to me and handed me some naked picture of myself and wanted me to sign it instead of my CD.

=== Neko Case & Her Boyfriends ===
Case recorded and toured for several years as Neko Case & Her Boyfriends before performing solely under her name. Albums released as Neko Case & Her Boyfriends include The Virginian (1997) and Furnace Room Lullaby (2000). She primarily performed her own material, but also performed and recorded cover versions of songs by artists such as My Morning Jacket, Harry Nilsson, Loretta Lynn, Tom Waits, Nick Lowe, Buffy Sainte-Marie, Scott Walker, Randy Newman, Queen, Bob Dylan, Neil Young, Sparks and Hank Williams.

=== New Pornographers ===
The 2010 New Pornographers album Together features Case as lead vocalist on "Crash Years" and "My Shepherd." The 2014 album Brill Bruisers features Case as lead vocalist on "Champions of Red Wine" and "Marching Orders." The 2017 album Whiteout Conditions features Case as lead vocalist on "Play Money" and "This is the World of the Theater."

=== case/lang/veirs ===
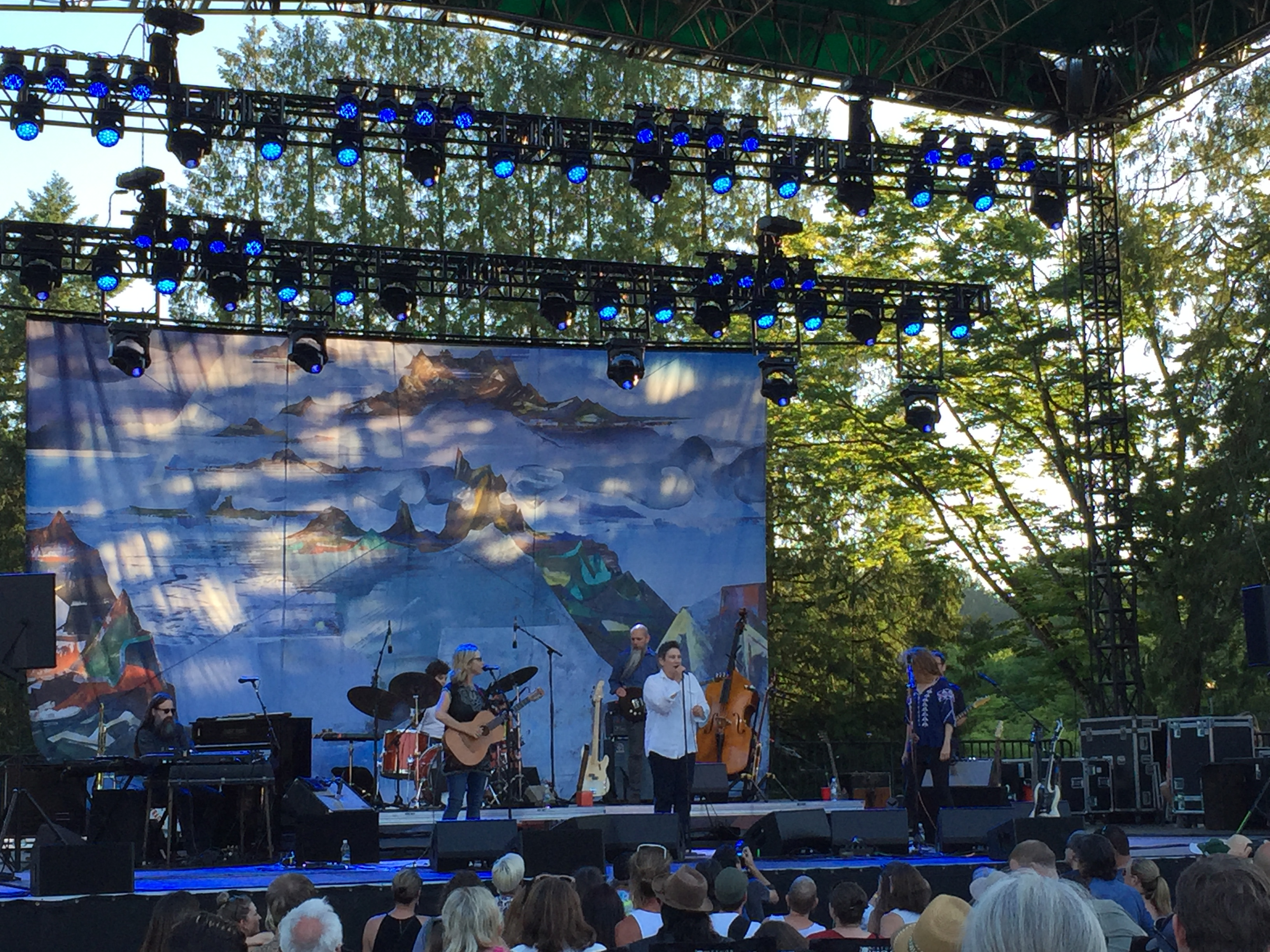
case/lang/veirs in 2016

In 2016, Neko Case, k.d. lang, and Laura Veirs announced the case/lang/veirs project, with an album released in June 2016.

=== Solo ===
==== Blacklisted ====
Case recorded her third full-length album, Blacklisted, in Tucson, Arizona. It was the first full-length album credited to Case alone, without Her Boyfriends, and was released on Bloodshot Records on August 20, 2002. Some believe the title Blacklisted alludes to Case being banned for life from the Grand Ole Opry because she took her shirt off during a performance on August 4, 2001, at one of their outdoors "Opry Plaza" concerts, though Case herself has denied this. Asked about the incident in 2004, Case said "I had heatstroke. People would love it to be a 'fuck you' punk thing. But it was actually a physical ailment thing."

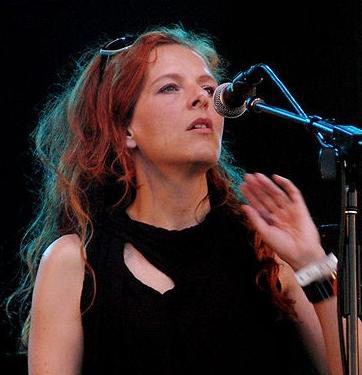
Case in 2009

Most of the album's fourteen songs are originals; the exceptions being covers of "Running Out of Fools", previously a hit for Aretha Franklin, and "Look for Me (I'll Be Around)" previously performed by Sarah Vaughan. Blacklisted finds Case even deeper in a "country noir" mood, and was described by critics as lush, bleak, and atmospheric. Case cited filmmaker David Lynch, composer Angelo Badalamenti, and Neil Young's soundtrack to the film Dead Man as influences.

I hope I can comfort people a bit—maybe show people that making music is fun and accessible to them as well. I'm not out to become Faith Hill, I never want to play an arena, and I never want to be on the MTV Video Music Awards, much less make a video with me in it. I would like to reach a larger audience and see the state of music change in favor of musicians and music fans in my lifetime. I care very much about that.

==== The Tigers Have Spoken ====
In April 2004, Case played several shows with longtime collaborators the Sadies in Chicago and Toronto. These shows were recorded and released as a live album, The Tigers Have Spoken, by Anti Records in October 2004.

==== Fox Confessor Brings the Flood ====
Fox Confessor Brings the Flood was released on March 7, 2006. The album was recorded primarily in Tucson, over the course of two years as Case worked on the live The Tigers Have Spoken and continued to play with the New Pornographers. Critics hailed the record not only for Case's trademark vocals but also her use of stark imagery and non-standard song structures. Fox Confessor Brings the Flood wound up on many "Best of 2006" lists, such as No.1 on the Amazon.com music editors' picks and No. 2 on NPR's All Songs Considered. The album debuted at No. 54 on the Billboard 200 albums chart. It contains Case's most autobiographical song, "Hold On, Hold On". Case said: "the song is actually about me. It's not metaphorical about other people. It's not little pieces of my life made into a story about someone else or someone fictitious."

"Hold On, Hold On" has since been covered by Marianne Faithfull on her 2009 album Easy Come, Easy Go. It was used over an episode of The Killing (Season 1 Episode 6) before the final credits, and in the 2015 film One More Time. "John Saw That Number" was used in the snowboarding movie "City. Park City".

==== Middle Cyclone ====
Case's next album, Middle Cyclone, was released on March 3, 2009. In advance of a U.S. and European tour, Case appeared as a musical guest on The Tonight Show with Jay Leno. Later in 2009 she also appeared on Late Show with David Letterman, The Tonight Show with Conan O'Brien and Late Night with Jimmy Fallon. Amazon.com rated Middle Cyclone the number one album of 2009. Middle Cyclone debuted at No. 3 on the Billboard charts in its first week of release, making it Case's first album ever to reach the top ten in the United States.

At the time of its release, no other record from an independent record company had debuted at a higher position in 2009. She toured extensively to promote Middle Cyclone with dates in North America, Europe, and Australia, as well as a performance at Lollapalooza 2009 in Grant Park, Chicago.

==== The Worse Things Get, the Harder I Fight, the Harder I Fight, the More I Love You ====
In June 2013, Case announced a new album, The Worse Things Get, the Harder I Fight, the Harder I Fight, the More I Love You, which was released on September 3.

==== Hell-On ====
In early March, 2018, Case released a teaser for an album titled Hell-On, her first solo work in almost five years. The teaser featured Case lying down singing a song of the same name while snakes move around her. The album was released on June 1, 2018.

==== Truckdriver, Gladiator, Mule ====
On November 13, 2015, Case released a compilation vinyl box set containing eight of her solo albums. The set contains her first six studio albums, including the first vinyl pressing of The Virginian, as well as a live album.

==== Wild Creatures ====
On April 19, 2022, Case released Wild Creatures, described as "digital-only, career retrospective". The album was released on CD, double vinyl, and MP3. It contains 22 tracks from Case's discography, plus one new song, "Oh, Shadowless".

==== Neon Grey Midnight Green ====
On September 26, 2025, she released Neon Grey Midnight Green. To support this release, Case will go on tour in Fall 2026.

== Awards and nominations ==
Case was honored as the Female Artist of the Year at the PLUG Independent Music Awards on February 2, 2006.

Case's album, Middle Cyclone, was nominated for Best Contemporary Folk Album and Best Recording Package (with Kathleen Judge) at the 52nd Annual Grammy Awards in 2010.

In 2014, The Worse Things Get, the Harder I Fight, the Harder I Fight, the More I Love You was nominated for Best Alternative Music Album at the 56th Annual Grammy Awards.

== Notable appearances ==
=== Television ===
Case has appeared on Season 29 (2003–04) and 39 (2013–14) of Austin City Limits.

In 2008, Case guest starred alongside Kelly Hogan on the season 5 episode of the adult animated television series Aqua Teen Hunger Force, Sirens, in which she (as "Chrysanthemum") and Hogan (as "The B.J. Queen") take the role of sirens who have taken former Philadelphia Phillies first baseman John Kruk (as himself) captive for arcane sexual purposes.

Case also voiced the character of Cheyenne Cinnamon in Aqua Teen Hunger Force co-creator Dave Willis's Cheyenne Cinnamon and the Fantabulous Unicorn of Sugar Town Candy Fudge.

On March 3, 2010, Case appeared as a guest on the Australian music quiz show Spicks and Specks. Her team, led by Alan Brough, won 18–16. At the end of the show she sang a cover of Heart's "Magic Man", backed by Kelly Hogan and Paul Rigby.

Case appeared in the 2022 film Quantum Cowboys as the character Alice.

=== Radio ===
Neko Case has appeared on NPR's weekly news quiz show, Wait Wait Don't Tell Me, as a guest on July 11, 2009 and as a panellist on September 6, 2013 and again on December 12, 2015.

On May 10, 2013, Case appeared as a guest on American Public Media's variety show Wits, where she ended the program with a rendition of Iron Maiden's "Number of the Beast". On February 7, 2014, Case appeared again as a guest on Wits, this time alongside Andy Richter, where she finished the program with a rendition of the Bee Gees' "Nights on Broadway".

In December 2015, Case appeared on BBC Radio 4's Woman's Hour, where she talked about her career and performed her single "I'll Be Around".

== Personal life ==
In a 2013 NPR interview, while discussing her single "Man", Case described having complicated feelings of gender and femininity: "I don't really think of myself specifically as a woman, you know? I'm kind of a critter... I'm probably a little imbalanced in that if you were to look at a human creature as kind of a vase or something, my glass is a little bit more full of the man stuff than the woman stuff". As of November 2025, her Twitter bio listed her pronouns as "She/Sir". Speaking with PBS News Hour in 2025 to promote her memoir, Case mentioned that she had "never felt like a girl" and described herself as "a genderfluid person".

In her 2025 memoir, The Harder I Fight the More I Love You, Neko writes "As a female-identifying person, I know my own tenacity and desire. I know the desires and passions of other women and we are unstoppable."

== Discography ==
=== Solo ===
==== Studio albums ====
Year	Album	Chart positions										Sales
Year	Album	US	US Indie	AUS	BEL (FL)	CAN	IRL	NED	SPA	SWI	UK	Sales
1997	The Virginian (with Her Boyfriends)	—	—	—	—	—	—	—	—	—	—	
2000	Furnace Room Lullaby (with Her Boyfriends)	—	—	—	—	—	—	—	—	—	—	
2002	Blacklisted	—	31	—	—	—	—	—	—	—	—	US: 113,000
2006	Fox Confessor Brings the Flood	54	4	—	—	—	—	—	—	—	—	US: 200,000
2009	Middle Cyclone	3	1	91	—	5	—	—	—	—	114	US: 223,000; CAN: 17,000
2013	The Worse Things Get, the Harder I Fight, the Harder I Fight, the More I Love You	12	1	—	115	8	—	99	—	—	63	
2018	Hell-On	31	4	88	—	—	—	—	—	—	—	
2025	Neon Grey Midnight Green	—	49	—	—	—	—	—	—	—	—	
"—" denotes album that did not chart or was not released

==== Live albums ====
Year	Album	Chart positions	
Year	Album	US Heat	US Indie
2004	The Tigers Have Spoken	14	19
2007	Live from Austin, TX	—	22
"—" denotes album that did not chart or was not released

==== Extended plays ====
- Canadian Amp (2001)

==== Compilation albums ====
- Wild Creatures (2022)

=== Singles ===
Title	Year	Peak chart positions			Album
Title	Year	US Airplay	US AAA	US Rock Digital	Album
"I Wish I Was the Moon"	2002	—	—	28	Blacklisted
"Bad Luck"	2018	—	20	—	Hell-On
"Wreck"	2025	45	11	—	Neon Grey and Midnight Green

=== Non-solo ===
==== case/lang/veirs ====
- case/lang/veirs (2016)

==== The Corn Sisters ====
- The Other Women (CA: Mint Records, 2000)

==== Cub ====
- Betti-Cola (CA: Mint Records, 1993)

==== Maow ====
- I Ruv Me Too (7-inch EP) (US: Twist Like This Records, 1995)
- The Unforgiving Sounds of Maow (CA: Mint Records, 1996)

==== The New Pornographers ====
- Mass Romantic (CA: Mint Records; US & EU: Matador Records, 2000)
- Electric Version (CA: Mint Records; US & EU: Matador Records, 2003)
- Twin Cinema (CA: Mint Records; US & EU: Matador Records, 2005)
- Challengers (CA: Last Gang Records; US & EU: Matador Records, 2007)
- Together (US: Matador Records, 2010)
- Brill Bruisers (CA: Last Gang Records; US: Matador Records, 2014)
- Whiteout Conditions (Concord Music Group, 2017)
- In the Morse Code of Brake Lights (Concord Records, 2019)
- Continue as a Guest (Merge Records, 2023)
- The Former Site Of (Merge Records, 2026)

==== The Sadies ====
- Make Your Bed/Gunspeak/Little Sadie (7-inch) (US: Bloodshot Records, 1998)
- Car Songs My '63 / Highway 145 (by Whiskeytown) (Split 7-inch) (US: Bloodshot Records BS 037, 1998)

==== Other contributions ====
- "Christmas Card from a Hooker in Minneapolis" on New Coat of Paint: The Songs of Tom Waits (2000)
- Journey to the End of the Night by the Mekons (2000)
- "Rolling Stone" on A Tribute to the Soundtrack to Robert Altman's Nashville (2002)
- "Mope-a-Long Rides Again", "Getting It Made" and "Bored Lil' Devil" on Still Lookin' Good to Me by the Band of Blacky Ranchette, (2003)
- "If I'm Gonna Sink (I Might as Well Go to the Bottom)" on Touch My Heart: a Tribute to Johnny Paycheck (SugarHill Recording Studios, 2003)
- "Knock Loud" on Fields & Streams (Kill Rock Stars compilation, 2003)
- I Want a Dog soundtrack (all vocals, 2003)
- "Buckets of Rain" on Sweetheart 2005: Love Songs (2005)
- "To Go Home" on Post-War by M. Ward (2006)
- "Hwy 5" on Forever Hasn't Happened Yet by John Doe (2005)
- "Fiery Crash" on Armchair Apocrypha by Andrew Bird (2007)
- "Yon Ferrets Return" (with Carl Newman) – Esopus 10: Good News (Esopus, CD insert, spring 2008)
- "Your Control" on Forfeit/Fortune by Crooked Fingers (2008)
- "Santa Left a Booger in My Stocking" (with Meatwad) on Have Yourself A Meaty Little Christmas (2009)
- Women and Country by Jakob Dylan (2010)
- "Silverado" on Oh Little Fire by Sarah Harmer (2010)
- "The Green Fields of Summer" on Midnight Souvenirs by Peter Wolf (2010)
- "Sing Me To Sleep" on Wreckorder by Fran Healy (2010)
- "Going Under", "Good", "Sleep", "Don't Try and Hide It" and "Companions" on No Color by the Dodos (2011)
- "She's Not There" – duet with Nick Cave, used at the end of the "She's Not There" episode of True Blood (2011)
- "Nothing to Remember", a song written and recorded for The Hunger Games: Songs from District 12 and Beyond (2012)
- "That's Who I Am" on Ghost Brothers of Darkland County, a musical by John Mellencamp, Stephen King, and T Bone Burnett (2013)
- Vocals on Desire Lines by Camera Obscura (2013)
- "Sun Song" on Warp and Weft by Laura Veirs (2013)
- "Nobody Knows You When You're Down and Out" on Boardwalk Empire Volume 2: Music from the HBO Original Series (2013)
- "These Aren't the Droids" on 2776 (2014)
- "One Voice", from the film, A Dog Named Gucci, also featuring Norah Jones, Aimee Mann, Susanna Hoffs, Lydia Loveless, Brian May and Kathryn Calder.
- Calexico's "Tapping on the Line" on the Edge of the Sun album (2015)
- "Danny's Song" on VINYL: Music From The HBO Original Series - Vol. 1.3 (2016)

== Videography ==
- Live from Austin TX Neko Case (DVD) (US: New West Records/Austin City Limits/KLRU, 2006)

== Books ==
- Case, Neko (January 28, 2025). The Harder I Fight the More I Love You: A Memoir (First hardcover ed.). New York: Grand Central Publishing. ISBN 9781538710500. OCLC 1437986984.

== See also ==
- List of musicians from British Columbia
- Music of Vancouver
