= Kelly Hogan =

American singer-songwriter (born 1965)

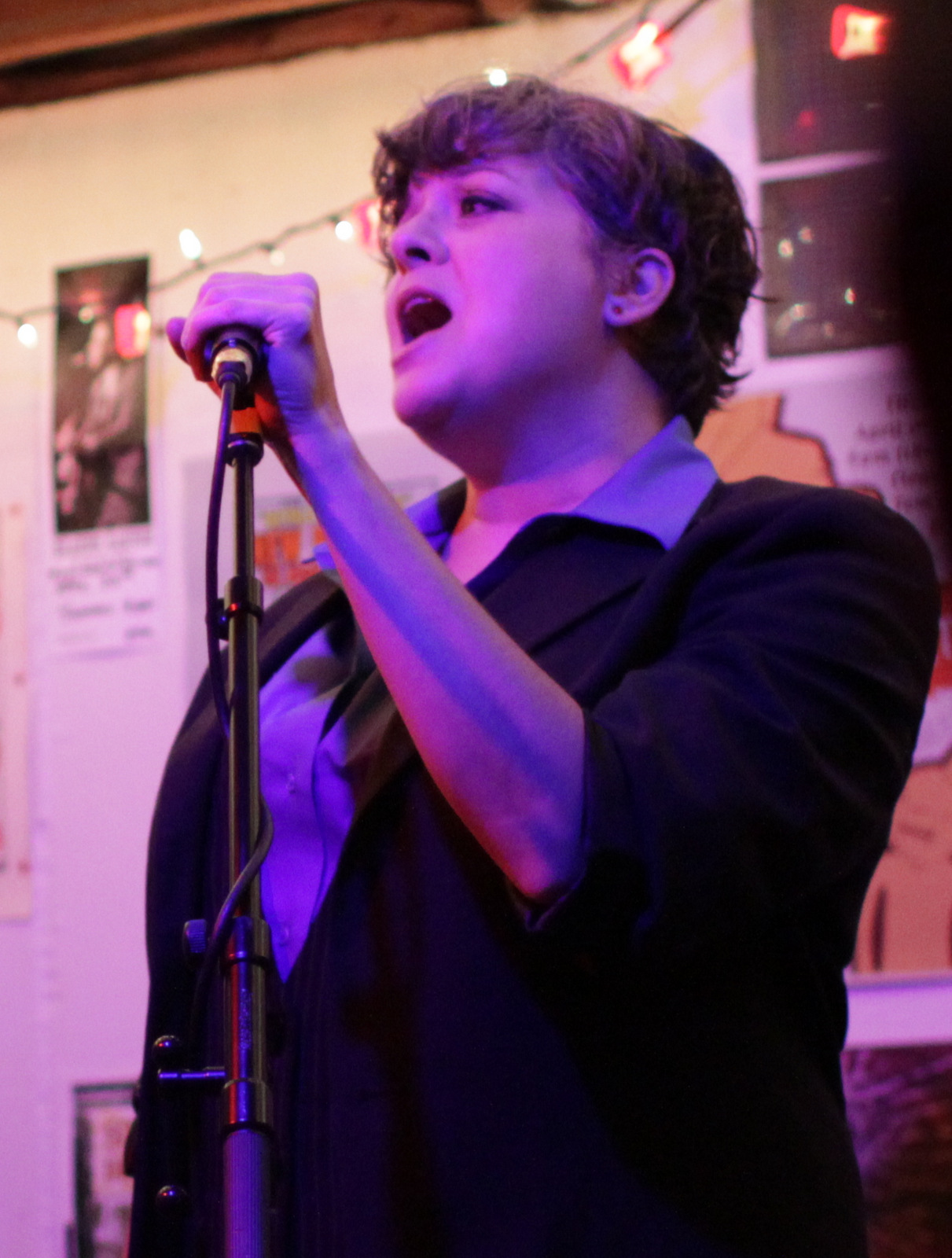

Background information
- Born: January 11, 1965 (age 61)
- Origin: Atlanta, Georgia; United States
- Genres: alternative country, jazz pop
- Occupation: Musician
- Instrument: Vocals
- Years active: 1990–present
- Labels: Bloodshot; Anti-

Kelly Hogan (born January 11, 1965) is an American singer-songwriter, often known for her work as a member of Neko Case's backing band, as well as for her solo work.

== Early and personal life ==
Hogan was born in Atlanta, Georgia, the daughter of a Vietnam War Army veteran helicopter pilot who went on to become a policeman. Hogan's parents divorced, with her mother later remarrying and relocating to Rutledge, Georgia while her father still lived in Douglasville, Georgia as of 2012.

Hogan is the oldest sister in her family. She has younger brothers. None of Hogan's family are musicians. Because both her parents worked, Hogan and her siblings spent most of their time with her grandmother in her apartment in midtown/downtown Atlanta growing up, where they listened to country music station WPLO. Music was constantly playing in her own home as well. She went to high school in Douglasville, Georgia. Although painfully shy, Hogan eventually auditioned for chorus, going to All State Chorus every year. In addition to being active in chorus and drama, Hogan started singing in bars when she was in high school.

Hogan often goes by the moniker "Hogan." She is an avid dog lover, and used to tend bar and tour accompanied by her late dog Augie. Hogan has a Jim Stacy lower-back tattoo that says "singers get all the pussy." After living in Evansville, Wisconsin, for eight years, Hogan returned to Chicago's Humboldt Park neighborhood in 2016.

== Musical career ==
=== The Jody Grind ===
In the late 1980s and early 1990s, Hogan sang with the cabaret, country, jazz, and punk band The Jody Grind (a Cabbagetown, Atlanta, Georgia, band originated by Bill Taft), singing on their full-lengths One Man's Trash Is Another Man's Treasure (1990) and Lefty's Deceiver (1992). The Jody Grind toured with singer Robyn Hitchcock. The group disbanded after two of its members were killed in a car crash.

=== Rock*A*Teens ===
In the mid-1990s, Hogan joined the indie rock band Rock*A*Teens, another Cabbagetown area band, appearing on their 1996 EP and the 1997 full-length Cry. Kelly Hogan played guitar and sang backing vocals in the band from 1994 to 1997. After the release of Cry, Hogan left the Rock*A*Teens and relocated from Atlanta to Chicago.

=== Solo career ===
Her debut solo record, The Whistle Only Dogs Can Hear, was released in 1996, and contained covers of songs by Will Oldham and Vic Chesnutt.

Hogan released her first record for Bloodshot Records entitled Beneath the Country Underdog in 2000. The record, "brilliantly intuitive readings of other people's songs," was produced by Jon Langford (Mekons, Waco Brothers). The Pine Valley Cosmonauts were her backing band.

Her second solo Bloodshot release, Because It Feel Good, was released in 2001 and was produced by Hogan and former Sugar bassist David Barbe. At the time of this record's release, rock critic Peter Margasak described Hogan as "principally an interpreter, capable of wringing more from a cover than most people can find in their own material," even though with this release she wrote two songs (with Andy Hopkins) on the record.

There was a comprehensive fan club page and mailing list focused on Kelly Hogan until 2006.

Hogan released her most recent solo record—and first record in 11 years, I Like To Keep Myself in Pain, on ANTI- in 2013. The album is a collection of songs either written for her or chosen for her by songwriter friends Andrew Bird, Vic Chesnutt, Jon Langford, Stephin Merritt, M. Ward, and others. The title track was written by Robyn Hitchcock. For the recording of this record, "a dream-team band" was assembled: organist Booker T. Jones, drummer James Gadson (Bill Withers, Beck), bassist Gabe Roth (The Dap-Kings), guitarist Scott Ligon (NRBQ). They recorded at EastWest Studios (Pet Sounds) in Hollywood, California.

As of 2021, Hogan continues to occasionally perform as singer/bandleader, especially in Chicago, often with accompanying musicians such as Nora O'Connor and Andy Hopkins, and with the Flat Five.

=== Collaborations ===
==== Neko Case ====
In 1998, Hogan joined singer-songwriter Neko Case's band, recording and touring with the band as a vocalist. Hogan continued to tour with Case, as of 2014. On her ongoing relationship with Neko Case: "We hit it off immediately when we met. We just spoke the same language." Hogan and Case sing "These Aren't the Droids" on the charity comedy album 2776 (2014). Hogan and Nora O'Connor accompanied Case in the song "Bad Luck", and accompanying video, from Case's 2018 album Hell-On.

==== Decemberists ====
In 2015, Hogan was a backing singer on the Decemberists' What a Terrible World, What a Beautiful World album, and also sang on the tour to support the album's release. Hogan also sang backing vocals on the Decemberists' 2018 album I'll Be Your Girl and the album's subsequent supporting tour.

==== Others' recordings ====
Hogan appears on records by Mavis Staples, The Mekons, Will Oldham, Matt Pond PA, Amy Ray, Giant Sand, Archer Prewitt, Alejandro Escovedo, Drive-By Truckers, Jakob Dylan, and Tortoise, among others. These recordings include:

- Silkworm – Italian Platinum (2002)
- Jakob Dylan – Women and Country (2010)
- Mavis Staples – You Are Not Alone (2010)
- Alejandro Escovedo – Burn Something Beautiful (2016)

==== Other projects ====
- The Flat Five: a "song interpreters" band made up of Kelly Hogan, Nora O'Connor, Scott Ligon, Casey McDonough and Alex Hall, typically performed annually at the Hideout (Chicago) holiday show. In 2016 The Flat Five released their 12-song debut album, It's a World of Love and Hope, on Bloodshot Records, and started performing in public more frequently, at the Hideout and elsewhere. Also on Bloodshot, they released a single, of Edgar Allen Poe's "The Raven" set to music, in 2017. The Flat Five released a second album, Another World, in 2020 on Pravda Records. Every song on both albums was written by Scott Ligon's older brother Chris.
- The Lamentations: gospel duo with Kelly Hogan and Nora O'Connor.
- Lipstick and Dynamite, Piss and Vinegar: The First Ladies of Wrestling: contributed songs to documentary film by Ruth Leitman, her friend (and former landlord from Cabbagetown), about women wrestlers
- The Love Hall Tryst – Songs of Misfortune: mostly a capella British folk music performed by indie supergroup composed of originator John Wesley Harding, Kelly Hogan, Nora O'Connor, and Brian Lohmann.
- Wee Hairy Beasties: children's music group based in Chicago, created by Jon Langford and comprising Jon Langford, Sally Timms, Kelly Hogan, and Devil in a Woodpile. They played their first gig together at the Brookfield Zoo in Chicago, and released two albums in 2006 and 2008.
- The Wooden Leg: jazz band, made up of Kelly Hogan, guitarist Joel Paterson, organist Scott Ligon, and drummer Kevin O'Donnell, that played regularly at the Hideout (Chicago) in a three-year-long residency during the first decade of the 21st century.
- WXRT radio station: For airplay, Hogan recorded a cover song a week for an entire year. Hogan also became one of three DJs for a popular WXRT show called "The Eclectic Company."

== Discography ==
A select discography:

- Appalachian Christmas (Cast album) (Theatrical Outfit, 1994)
- The Whistle Only Dogs Can Hear (Long Play Records, 1996)
- Beneath the Country Underdog (Bloodshot Records, 2000)
- Because it Feel Good (Bloodshot Records, 2001)
- I Like To Keep Myself in Pain (ANTI-, 2012)

=== Compilation contributions ===
- "13 Nights" – Down to the Promised Land: 5 Years of Bloodshot Records- as Kelly Hogan & the Pine Valley Cosmonauts (Bloodshot, 2000)
- "1,000,001" (by The Sadies/Kelly Hogan) Making Singles, Drinking Doubles (Bloodshot, 2002)
- "Hanky Panky Woman" (by J. Owen/L. Johnson) Making Singles, Drinking Doubles – as Kelly Hogan & the Mellocremes (Bloodshot, 2002)
- "It's Only Make Believe" (by J. Nance/C. Twitty) Making Singles, Drinking Doubles – as Kelly Hogan & John Wesley Harding (Bloodshot, 2002)
- "Chicken Road" – For A Decade of Sin: 11 Years of Bloodshot Records – as Kelly Hogan & the Wooden Leg (Bloodshot, 2005)
- "Gotta Have My Baby Back" – Too Late to Pray: Defiant Chicago Roots (Bloodshot, 2019)

== Acting career ==
- During the mid-1990s, Hogan performed in starring roles in the stage productions of Appalachian Christmas and The Dead Sea Scrolls and Other Chilling Tales of the Sea at Theatrical Outfit in Atlanta.
- In 1995, Hogan played Simon Zealotes in the Indigo Girls' revival of the musical Jesus Christ Superstar.
- In 2008, Hogan lent her voice to the season 5 episode of the adult animated television series Aqua Teen Hunger Force, Sirens, in which she (as "The B.J. Queen") and Neko Case (as "Chrysanthemum") take the role of sirens who have taken former Philadelphia Phillies first baseman John Kruk (as himself) captive for arcane sexual purposes.
- In 2013, Neko Case and Hogan performed on Wits, singing songs and acting out comedy skits.

== Other work ==
From 1998 to 2008 Hogan worked as a bartender at The Hideout, a music venue in Chicago known for putting on an annual block party in September. Circa 2000 she also worked as a technician at a Chicago veterinary clinic. She also worked publicity for Bloodshot Records.

As of 2013, Hogan once again was working as an assistant for her friend, American cartoonist and author, Lynda Barry, helping her arrange her teaching schedule. In one episode of Barry's Ernie Pook's Comeek, children are peering in a window of the Hideout nightclub in Chicago, listening to Hogan's band The Wooden Leg.

== See also ==
- Bloodshot Records
- Neko Case
- Nora O'Connor
- Pine Valley Cosmonauts
