= New Deal (Waco Brothers album) =

Studio album by Waco Brothers
- Released: October 22, 2002
- Genre: Alternative country
- Label: Bloodshot

Waco Brothers chronology
Electric Waco Chair (2000)	New Deal (2002)	Nine Slices of My Midlife Crisis (2004)

New Deal is an album by the American band Waco Brothers, released on October 22, 2002. They supported it with North American and United Kingdom tours.

== Production ==
The album was recorded in Chicago. "Just No Way" is narrated by a schizophrenic killer. "AFC Song" pays tribute to alcohol, freedom, and country songs. "The Lie" and "Blink of an Eye" criticize the administration of George W. Bush. "Johnson to Jones" is about a May-December romantic relationship. The cover art was painted by frontman Jon Langford.

== Critical reception ==
Professional ratings
Review scores
Source	Rating
All Music Guide to Country	4/5 stars
Blender	3/5 stars
Robert Christgau	(3-star Honorable Mention)
The Philadelphia Inquirer	3/4 stars
Pitchfork	6.0/10
(The New) Rolling Stone Album Guide	3.5/5 stars
The Tampa Tribune	A

The Tampa Tribune praised the Waco Brothers' "rambunctious" alternative country and "biting" lyrics. The Santa Fe New Mexican called it "their strongest album since Cowboy in Flames." Pitchfork said that "certain blissfully raucous moments on this album make one imagine a Clash that kept going, that became semi-competent at barn-dance swing". Blender concluded that "humor and backwoods swing always prevail in the end over heartbreak and political disillusionment."

Goldmine admired that "the band rip it up, as expected, but the clarity of the production evidently tightens their interplay." The Lexington Herald-Leader listed it among the best albums of 2002. The Chicago Tribune listed it among the best Chicago albums of 2002 and noted that "the Wacos hammer out populist anthems for a blue-collar world of dwindling wages and dead-end possibilities."

== Track listing ==
No.	Title	Length
1.	"Poison"
2.	"No Heart"
3.	"In the Honky Tonk Shadows"
4.	"Johnson to Jones"
5.	"Blink of an Eye"
6.	"New Moon"
7.	"Better Everyday"
8.	"Just No Way"
9.	"AFC Song"
10.	"New Deal Blues"
11.	"I'm a Ghost"
12.	"The Lie"
