= Wacoworld =

Studio album by the Waco Brothers
- Released: 1999
- Studio: Kingsize Soundlabs
- Genre: Country
- Label: Bloodshot
- Producers: Ken Sluiter, Waco Brothers

The Waco Brothers chronology
Do You Think About Me? (1997)	Wacoworld (1999)	Electric Waco Chair (2000)

Wacoworld is an album by the Chicago-based band the Waco Brothers, released in 1999.

== Production ==
Wacoworld's songs were written by Jon Langford and Dean Schlabowske. Poi Dog Pondering's horn section played on some of the album's tracks.

== Critical reception ==
Professional ratings
Review scores
Source	Rating
AllMusic	2.5/5 stars
Chicago Sun-Times	3/4 stars
Robert Christgau	A−
(The New) Rolling Stone Album Guide	3/5 stars
The Tampa Tribune	3/4 stars

No Depression wrote that Schlabowske's "heavy, blue-collar vocal presence is a delight, especially on the soon-to-be-abducted-by-aliens weeper 'Hello to Everybody' and the outlawish 'Red Brick Wall'." Robert Christgau thought that Langford and Schlabowske "sing so lustily that the band's indifference to the niceties of country as it exists in history is of no consequence." The Washington Post opined that "forays into blues and Western swing aren't enough to keep Waco World interesting when Langford's distinctive songs yield to Schlabowske's merely competent ones."

CMJ New Music Report decided that "the entire album brims with rough-hewn vocals, twangy electricity, and a cool, literary bent." Spin deemed it "flesh'n'blood country-western insurgence." The North County Times called Wacoworld "crack insurgent country."

AllMusic lamented that "the English cowboy gag is wearing thin."

== Track listing ==
All tracks composed by the Waco Brothers

No.	Title	Length
1.	"Pigsville"
2.	"Hello to Everybody"
3.	"Fire Down Below"
4.	"Red Brick Wall"
5.	"The Hand That Throws the Bottle Down"
6.	"Regrets"
7.	"Train Back in Time"
8.	"Day of the Dead"
9.	"Broken Down Row"
10.	"Good for Me"
11.	"Corrupted"
12.	"Northwoods"
13.	"Famous Last Words"

== Personnel ==
- Mr. Tracey Dear – mandolin
- Cover Boy Doughty – bass
- Leopard Boy Goulding – drums
- Jonboy – vocals, guitar
- Deano – guitar, vocals
- Durante – steel guitar, 12-string electric guitar

with:

- Rico Bell – vocals on "Pigsville"
- Kelly Hogan – vocals on "The Hand That Throws the Bottle Down"
- Barkley McKay – organ on "Hello Everybody", piano on "Red Brick Wall"
- Paul Martens – saxophone on "Red Brick Wall" and "Corrupted"
- Dave Max Crawford – trumpet on "Red Brick Wall" and "Broken Down Wall", accordion on "Broken Down Wall"
- Rick Cookin' Sherry – washboard on "Red Brick Wall"
- John Rice – fiddle on "The Hand That Throws the Bottle Down" and "Day of the Dead"
