= Atomic Records (Milwaukee record shop) =

Former independent-music store in Milwaukee, Wisconsin

- Atomic Records logo
- Industry: Music retail
- Founded: 1985
- Founder: Rich Menning
- Defunct: March 15, 2009
- Headquarters: 43°4′15.3″N 87°53′14.9″W, Milwaukee, Wisconsin, United States
- Website: www.atomic-records.com

Atomic Records a former independent-music store in Milwaukee, Wisconsin, started trading in 1985. It became one of the oldest and best-known record-stores in the Milwaukee area before going out of business on March 15, 2009.

== History ==
Atomic Records specialized in alternative and independent music and developed a clientele drawn in part from the colleges surrounding its East Side location. In 2002, Billboard described the 1,300-square-foot store as a "left-of-center tastemaker" whose inventory emphasized independent rock, electronic music, punk, trip hop and other genres underserved by larger retailers. Owner Rich Menning maintained accounts with more than 70 distributors and also purchased recordings directly from record labels and overseas suppliers, allowing the store to carry independent releases, imports and vinyl that were less widely available.

The store became a gathering place for musicians and participants in Milwaukee's independent music scene. Musician Dan Didier later recalled that musicians regularly met at Atomic and used the store as an informal exchange point for recordings and other materials, while former employees Josh Modell and James Minor produced the music publication MILK. Former employee Damian Strigens similarly described Atomic as actively fostering local bands; his band The Mustn'ts originated from a conversation at the store with fellow employee and musician Mark Waldoch. Musicians also credited Menning and the store with promoting locally released recordings and connecting bands with distributors and other music-industry contacts.

Atomic Records also played a role in the development of Don't Say Please: The Oral History of Die Kreuzen, a 2025 book by Milwaukee writer and musician Sahan Jayasuriya. While working at Atomic in 2006, Jayasuriya was introduced to Die Kreuzen's Cows and Beer by Atomic Records owner Rich Menning. Jayasuriya subsequently met members of the band through the store, experiences that contributed to his interest in documenting the band's history and eventually led to the book.

In December 2008, Menning announced that Atomic would close after more than two decades in business, citing changing consumer habits, declining music-industry sales and the contemporary economic downturn. The store closed in 2009.

== Music releases and events ==
=== Music releases ===
In 1989, Atomic Records released Badger A Go-Go, a compilation documenting the Milwaukee-area alternative and underground music scene. The compilation featured 15 acts, including Die Kreuzen, Plasticland, Brian Ritchie & the Ghostly Trio, Couch Flambeau, Appliances-SFB, F/i, Cherry Cake, and Boy Dirt Car. Store owner Rich Menning conceived the project in late 1988 and selected the participating acts for the release.

In 2019, Atomic Records and Hi-Fi Records jointly released Milwaukee musician Abby Jeanne's single Get You High on 7-inch vinyl and cassette. The release was accompanied by an event at Hi-Fi Cafe that recreated elements of the former Atomic Records store, with Menning participating.

=== Live events ===
Atomic Records regularly hosted in-store performances during its years of operation. Artists who appeared at the store included The Smashing Pumpkins, Alkaline Trio, Juliana Hatfield, Frank Black, The Wedding Present, and Jason Molina.

For the inaugural Record Store Day in 2008, the store presented a day of performances by local acts including Juniper Tar, Mark Waldoch, Brief Candles, Testa Rosa, Scarring Party, Signaldrift, and Collections of Colonies of Bees.

Following the store's closure, the Atomic Valentine farewell concert was held at Milwaukee's Miramar Theatre on February 14, 2009. The event brought together bands and musicians associated with Atomic Records and Milwaukee's local music scene, including Boy Dirt Car, Liquid Pink, Cherry Cake, Eric Blowtorch, The Lovelies (Liv Mueller), Sometime Sweet Susan, The Etiquette, The Mighty Deer Lick, and Mark Waldoch. Several acts reunited for the event.
