= Dean Schlabowske =

American guitarist, singer, and songwriter

Dean Schlabowske at FitzGerald's 36th American Music Festival, July 1, 2017.

Dean Schlabowske (aka Deano, or Deano Waco, or Ramblin' Deano) is an American guitarist, singer, and songwriter. He has been a member of several bands including Wreck, The Waco Brothers, Dollar Store, Deano and the Purvs, in addition to his solo work and various other collaborations.

== Early life ==
Schlabowske grew up in Milwaukee, Wisconsin, but has spent much of his adult life living in Chicago, Illinois. From 2007-2012, he owned and operated the Cellar Rat wine shop in Wicker Park.

== Career ==
In 2014, Schlabowske moved to Austin, Texas. There, he continued his collaboration with former members of The Meat Purveyors, and started a band called TV White. "Due to an illness in the family and the desire to buy an affordable home," Schlabowske returned to Milwaukee in 2017.

== Solo Discography ==
=== Albums ===
- 2004: Dollar Store (Bloodshot Records) - as Dollar Store
- 2004: Money Music (Bloodshot Records) - as Dollar Store
- 2017: America's Favorite Folk Singer (Pigsville Music, BMI)
- 2018: Soundtrack To The Next IPO (Pigsville Music, BMI)
- 2019: Ramblin' Deano And Ice Cold Singles (Pigsville Music, BMI) - as Ramblin' Deano and Ice Cold Singles
- 2020: Pills, Puppies And Bacon (Pigsville Music, BMI) - as Ramblin' Deano And His Enablers
- 2020: Bad Luck Days (Pigsville Music, BMI) - as Ramblin' Deano And The Purvs

=== Singles ===
- Frozen Lake/Slipstream (Pigsville Music, BMI) - as TV White
- 2020: We Move On (Pigsville Music, BMI)

== See also ==
- Wreck
- The Waco Brothers
- Pine Valley Cosmonauts
