= Salute the Majesty of Bob Wills =

Studio album by Pine Valley Cosmonauts
- Released: September 8, 1998
- Recorded: 1998
- Genre: Country music, western swing
- Length: 54:43
- Label: Bloodshot Records

Salute the Majesty of Bob Wills is a tribute album by the Pine Valley Cosmonauts, released on September 8, 1998, on Bloodshot Records. It consists of the Pine Valley Cosmonauts' covers of songs originally performed and written by legendary western swing musician Bob Wills. Artists featured on the album include Jimmie Dale Gilmore, Alejandro Escovedo, Edith Frost and Robbie Fulks.

== Reception ==
Professional ratings
Review scores
Source	Rating
AllMusic	4/5 stars
The A.V. Club	(positive)
Robert Christgau	(choice cut)
Entertainment Weekly	B+
The New Rolling Stone Album Guide	4/5 stars

The album received mainly favorable reviews from music critics, such as Kurt Wolff, who wrote in Country Music: The Rough Guide that it exactly projected the "rowdy" spirit of Wills' music. It was also praised by Wills' daughter, Rosetta, who called it "the best tribute to my father's music I've ever heard."

== Track listing ==
1. Home in San Antone (vocals by Chris Mills)
2. Trouble in Mind (vocals by Jimmie Dale Gilmore)
3. Texas Playboy Rag (instro)
4. Drunkard's Blues (vocals by Kelly Hogan)
5. Across the Alley from the Alamo (vocals by Robbie Fulks)
6. Sweet Kind of Love (vocals by Jon Langford)
7. Time Changes Everything (vocals by Jane Baxter Miller)
8. Hang Your Head in Shame (vocals by Bob Boyd of The Sundowners)
9. Steel Guitar Rag (instro)
10. Brain Cloudy Blues (vocals by Deano of Dollar Store & The Waco Brothers)
11. Right or Wrong (vocals by Sally Timms)
12. Roly Poly (vocals by Brett Sparks of The Handsome Family)
13. Pan Handle Rag (instro)
14. Bubbles in My Beer (vocals by Tracey Dear of The Waco Brothers)
15. Stay a Little Longer (vocals by Neko Case and Bob Boyd)
16. My Window Faces the South (vocals by Edith Frost)
17. "San Antonio Rose" (vocals by Alejandro Escovedo)
18. Take Me Back to Tulsa (vocals by the Meat Purveyors)
19. Faded Love (vocals by Rico Bell and Jane Baxter Miller)
