= Cowboy in Flames =

Studio album by the Waco Brothers
- Released: January 21, 1997
- Studio: Kingsize Soundlabs
- Genre: Country, rock, alternative country
- Label: Bloodshot

The Waco Brothers chronology
To the Last Dead Cowboy (1995)	Cowboy in Flames (1997)	Do You Think About Me? (1997)

Cowboy in Flames is an album by the Chicago-based band the Waco Brothers, released on January 21, 1997. The band supported the album with a North American tour. Frontman Jon Langford used the title of one of the album's tracks, "Death of Country Music", for an art project that was exhibited in Chicago and Nashville in 1998.

== Production ==
The album was recorded at Kingsize Soundlabs, in Chicago. Steel guitarist Mark Durante joined the band prior to the sessions. "Death of Country Music" is an indictment of the country pop produced in Nashville; the song incorporates elements of the spiritual "Dem Bones". "Fast Train Down" is about a man who leaves his warehouse job to try his luck in Las Vegas. "See Willy Fly By" is an interpretation of the traditional folk song "The Cuckoo". "Wreck on the Highway" is a version of the Dorsey Dixon song. "Big River" was written by Johnny Cash. "White Lightning" is a cover of the song made famous by George Jones. Do You Think About Me?, the band's next album, was made up of songs recorded during the same sessions.

== Critical reception ==
Professional ratings
Review scores
Source	Rating
AllMusic	4/5 stars
Chicago Tribune	3.5/4 stars
Fort Worth Star-Telegram	2.5/5 stars
Lincoln Journal Star	5/5 stars
Orlando Sentinel	4/5 stars
The Philadelphia Inquirer	3.5/4 stars
The Village Voice	A−

Billboard stated that "the Waco Brothers are a brilliant band whose sound is possessed by the demon of rock'n'roll, haunted by the ghosts of old country music, and soaked soul-deep in the blues." The Lincoln Journal Star opined that "the Wacos never misfire, whether on the title cut's shook-up, honky-tonk slide, the Bo Diddley-was-a-cowboy drive of 'Out in the Light' or the stripped-down straight country of 'Fast Train Down'." The Sun Sentinel said that the Waco Brothers "know that good rock can still rattle heads, but country cuts a cleaner path to the heart."

The Chicago Tribune stated that "the band recklessly encompasses T. Rex boogie, Bo Diddley beats, weepy steel guitar, flamenco dirges, gorgeous Gram Parsons balladry, Dylanesque train songs and punky-tonk dirges." Robert Christgau, in The Village Voice, noted that "many of the originals surpass" the cover songs. Greil Marcus, in Artforum, labeled the music "British country without apologies." The Fort Worth Star-Telegram opined that the band "is far too self-conscious and lacks personality."

AllMusic called Cowboy in Flames "one of the finest albums to emerge from the Chicago alt-country scene."

== Track listing ==
No.	Title	Length
1.	"See Willy Fly By"
2.	"Waco Express"
3.	"Take Me to the Fires"
4.	"Out There a Ways"
5.	"Dollar Dress"
6.	"Out in the Light"
7.	"Cowboy in Flames"
8.	"Fast Train Down"
9.	"Wreck on the Highway"
10.	"Dry Land"
11.	"Do What I Say"
12.	"White Lightning"
13.	"Big River"
14.	"Death of Country Music"
