= Boy Dirt Car =

American industrial and experimental noise band

- Logo of Boy Dirt Car

Background information
- Also known as: BDC
- Origin: Milwaukee, Wisconsin, U.S.
- Genres: Industrial, experimental, noise
- Years active: 1981–present
- Label: After Music Recordings
- Members: Darren Brown; Julie Brown; James Allen Graham; Dylan Ritchie; Josh Mead
- Past members: Eric Lunde; Peder Hedman; Steven "T.S." Whalen; Dave Szolwinski; Karl Palouček; Keith Brammer; Dan Kubinski; Rick McCollum

Boy Dirt Car (BDC) is a U.S. industrial ensemble and experimental noise band formed by Darren Brown and Eric Lunde in Milwaukee, Wisconsin, in 1981. The band is active in Minneapolis, Minnesota, and regularly tours in and beyond the Upper Midwest.

Emerging during the early development of industrial music in the United States, BDC became known for combining conventional instrumentation with metal, found objects, tape, electronics, noise and improvisation. The band developed within Milwaukee's experimental and punk music scene alongside contemporaries such as Die Kreuzen, the Oil Tasters, and Couch Flambeau. BDC received national media attention in 1985, including coverage in The Wall Street Journal, as industrial music began attracting attention beyond the underground music press.

BDC's early years produced a series of cassette and vinyl releases and included touring throughout the United States. Following Lunde's departure around 1988, Brown continued working in experimental music before re-forming BDC in 2007. The re-formed band has maintained an extensive recording output with a changing lineup, combining elements of its earlier industrial sound with rock, electronic experimentation, sound collage, spoken word and improvised noise.

== History ==
=== Formation and early years (1981–1988) ===
Boy Dirt Car was founded in Milwaukee in 1981 by Darren Brown and Eric Lunde. The band emerged during the same period as German experimental group Einstürzende Neubauten (EB), which had formed in West Berlin the previous year. BDC's use of noise, metal and unconventional sound sources later drew comparisons between the two groups, with Chris Sienko of Gapers Block describing BDC as at times resembling an American counterpart to EB. The two groups shared a bill at Chicago's Metro in 1985.

Ticket for Einstürzende Neubauten with Boy Dirt Car at Cabaret Metro in Chicago, May 8, 1985.

BDC attracted national media attention as industrial music began receiving coverage beyond the underground music press. In October 1985, Diane Petzke included the group in a Wall Street Journal feature examining the emerging industrial-music movement in the United States and Europe, interviewing founder Darren Brown as part of the report. Two months later, Petzke's reporting was discussed in Ann Landers' nationally syndicated advice column after a reader wrote to Landers about the Wall Street Journal article, specifically identifying Boy Dirt Car and its 1984 release, Catalyst among its examples.

Ann Landers' December 19, 1985 column discussing industrial music, including Boy Dirt Car, Catalyst, and the band's recording methods and locations.

=== Re-formation and later activity (2007–present) ===
Boy Dirt Car re-formed in 2007 when Darren Brown resumed recording with former collaborators in Milwaukee. Brown later recalled that the resulting recordings "just sounded like Boy Dirt Car," prompting the revival of the band. The renewed band released Spoken Answer to a Silent Question later that year, marking its return to recording after an extended absence.

The band continued recording prolifically following its return, with more than thirty productions since its 2010 release of Familia, which brought together Brown with several musicians associated with the band's earlier period, including Dave Szolwinski, Dan Kubinski, Keith Brammer, and Steven "T.S." Whalen, while Eric Lunde did not participate. By 2012, the band was continuing to produce both new and archival work. BDC's recordings continued to receive attention in Milwaukee, with WMSE including Familia among its 2010 year-end selections and Old Ways among its DJs' favorite local releases of 2022. In January 2016 Tony Coulter of New Jersey–based WFMU devoted a substantial portion of his program to Boy Dirt Car, playing seven tracks from Ghostshirt.

During the later 2010s and early 2020s, BDC continued recording while going through changes in both its sound and personnel. On Silver, recorded in 2016 and 2017, the band combined spoken and recited poetry with rock instrumentation, sound collage, electronic experimentation and improvised noise, while some tracks retained the industrial character of its earlier work. The poetry-oriented material also drew comparisons to Darren Brown's intervening project Impact Test. The 2018 release, Grava, continued its combination of rock, electronic sound, improvisation and industrial elements. In 2020, Broad Street Review described Venice Beach as combining ambient and noise music with distorted voices, drones, percussion, and rock elements.

Boy Dirt Car is documented in later histories of Milwaukee's early alternative music scene, including the 2017 oral history ''Brick Through the Window: An Oral History of Punk Rock, New Wave & Noise in Milwaukee, 1964–1984'' and the 2023 documentary ''Taking the City By Storm: The Birth of Milwaukee's Punk Scene''.

Promotional artwork for Boy Dirt Car's 40th anniversary performances in 2021.

Boy Dirt Car marked its 40th anniversary in 2021. By then, the band's contemporary incarnation was centered around Darren and Julie Brown, and the group remained highly productive. The band continued recording into the following years; a 2023 review of Sinners of Saints described BDC as still operating outside conventional musical scenes more than four decades after its formation.

== Musical style ==
Boy Dirt Car's use of noise, metal and unconventional sound sources centers them as early and ongoing participants in the industrial-music movement, sometimes described as "junk rock". Diane Petzke of The Wall Street Journal reported that the group used automobile parts obtained from junkyards and abandoned cars as sound sources. Founder Darren Brown described the approach as deliberately structured ensemble music rather than simply the production of noise, with found objects selected for their particular sonic qualities. Petzke also reported that Catalyst was recorded beneath an underpass and in the former Schlitz brewery, locations chosen to reflect the group's interest in "dangerous music" and the antisocial effects of industrialization.

== Performances and touring ==
During its early years, Boy Dirt Car performed outside Milwaukee extensively, including a 1987 tour with fellow Milwaukee band Die Kreuzen. Documented performances from the tour include shows in Berkeley, Spokane, and Portland. The Berkeley performance at 924 Gilman Street included The Lookouts and Isocracy.

Since its reformation, the band participated in The Songs of Grant Hart tribute concerts in Minneapolis, including appearances in 2021 and 2022. In 2025, Boy Dirt Car performed at Milwaukee's Jazz Gallery Center for the Arts with Illusion of Safety, Drekka, Karl Palouček, and Sean Hendley. The band has continued to perform outside its Midwestern base, with its first New York City appearance planned for 2026.

== Members ==
Boy Dirt Car in Minneapolis, 2026. From left: Julie Brown, Darren Brown, and James Allen Graham.

Darren Brown — Founder (1981–present), electronics, tapes, vocals, guitar. Brown also led independent projects including Texar and Impact Test, a prolific industrial-music poetry group.

Eric Lunde — Founder (1981–1988), electronics, tapes, vocals, guitar. Lunde subsequently developed an extensive solo career in experimental sound, releasing dozens of recordings and collaborations across multiple labels.

Julie Unruly Brown — (present) guitars, strings, keyboard, vocals. A core member of the re-formed band, Brown has co-led its contemporary incarnation with Darren Brown.

James Allen Graham — (present) electronics, microphones, metal. Graham also performs electronic and noise music under the name Timmy the Tapeworm.

Josh Mead — (present) bass, keyboards, graphic arts.

Dylan Ritchie — (present) drums, guitar, keyboards.

Dave "The Oracle" Szolwinski — (original member) metal, vocals. Founder and vocalist of Fuckface. Continues as a guest performer with BDC.

Steven "T.S." Whalen (d. 2025) (Impact Test, Einstein's Riceboys, Monkey Bar) — (original member) drums, plastic, vocals; active with BDC through Crime Boss (2025), released posthumously.

Keith Brammer (Die Kreuzen) — (original member) bass.

Dan Kubinski — (Die Kreuzen) (original member) guitar, drum, vocals.

Karl Palouček — (joined 2007) bass, metal. Palouček co-founded Shrilltower and also performed with Impact Test and Fuckface.

Peder Hedman (d. 2017) (Liquid Pink, Tweaker, Peder Hedman Quartet) — guitars on Spoken Answer to a Silent Question (2007).

Rick McCollum (Afghan Whigs) — guitar, appears on 2010's Familia.

Jeff Hamilton — guitar on Spoken Answer to a Silent Question (2007).

Jerry Exline (Tense Experts)— bass.

R. Paul Heilemann — drums.

Bruce McDonald — bass.

Joe Schkeryantz — drums.

Steve Nodine — synthesizer.

Dale Stamey (d.) — violin, tape.

Tony Selig (d.)— metal.

Manny Carlos — violin, 2023/24.

== Discography ==
Selected releases by Boy Dirt Car: F/i, Familia, Catalyst, Winter, Boy Dirt Car, and Heatrig.

- Fracture — 1982 — Art Weather — cassette
- Gravel on Urine — 1983 — Art Weather — cassette
- Ghost Shirt — 1984 — Art Weather — cassette
- Catalyst — 1984 — Artweather Communications — cassette
- Split — 1985 — RRR Records — vinyl
- Sub Pop 100 — 1986 — Sub Pop — compilation LP; “Impact Test” — vinyl
- Winter — 1986 — RRR Records — vinyl
- Live with Out a Body — 1987 — RRR Records — double vinyl
- Music From the Dead Zone Two: USA — 1987 — Dead Man's Curve — compilation LP; “Extract from He Tore Out His Eyes” — vinyl
- Badger A-Go-Go — 1989 — Atomic Records — compilation LP; “K.I.D.”
- Instinctual — 1993 — RRR Records — vinyl
- Heat Rig — 2001 — Lexicon Devil — compact disc
- Winter / Split — 2003 — Lexicon Devil — compact disc
- Spoken Answer to a Silent Question — 2007 — After Music Recordings — compact disc
- Familia — 2010 — After Music Recordings — vinyl
- Treacherous Young Witches — 2010 — After Music Recordings — vinyl
- Good Bye Milwaukee — 2011 — After Music Recordings — vinyl
- Black House for Scott — 2012 — After Music Recordings — compact disc
- Wheels — 2016 — After Music Recordings — compact disc
- Psychic Driving Treatment — 2017 — After Music Recordings — compact disc / compilation
- Silver — 2017 — After Music Recordings — compact disc
- Family Live — 2018 — After Music Recordings — compact disc
- Grava — 2018 — After Music Recordings — compact disc
- Curve 101 .56 .46 .1021 [Low Res] — 2019 — After Music Recordings — compact disc
- Venice Beach — 2020 — NO RENT — cassette
- Solar Mountain — 2020/2021 — After Music Recordings — CD-R / digital
- Boy Dirt Car — 2021 — After Music Recordings — cassette / CD / digital
- Boy Dirt Car Red Death Walks — 2021 — After Music Recordings — cassette / compact disc
- Old Ways — 2022 — Industrial Coast — cassette
- Sinners or Saints (Live) — 2022 — After Music Recordings — cassette / compact disc / lathe-cut 7"
- Lies About Wives — 2023 — After Music Recordings — cassette / compact disc
- Circus of Humanity — 2024 — After Music Recordings — compact disc
- Unacceptably Contamination — After Music Recordings — compact disc
- Crime Boss – Salem Church Road – Brutus — 2025 — digital
- I Only Like LA at Night — 2025 — After Music Recordings — vinyl
- Let's Go Dancing: Tribute to Kevn Kinney — “Got to Move Along” with Gordon Gano (Violent Femmes) — Taste Records — 2025 — vinyl
- Discotek — 2026 — digital
- Guillotine Girls — 2026 — with Samuel Locke Ward — digital / limited-edition 12" vinyl
- Wippoorwills, bats & hoot owls & their outlandish noises — 2026 — digital
- Revenge Tapes — After Music Recordings — cassette / lathe-cut 7"
- Live Lathe Cut 7" — After Music Recordings — 45, 8 copies
- Crazy — After Music Recordings — lathe-cut 7", 45, 8 copies
- Occams Razor — After Music Recordings — lathe-cut 7", 45, 10 copies [take from Old Ways, 2022, Industrial Coast]

Film

- Neptune Is a Power Station — 2023 — short film by Boy Dirt Car
