= Wreck (band) =

American indie rock band

- Origin: Milwaukee, Wisconsin, United States
- Genres: Indie rock, industrial rock
- Years active: 1988–1994
- Labels: Play It Again Sam, Wax Trax!, C/Z
- Past members: Dean Schlabowske; Bart Flores; Keith Brammer; Kurt Moore

Wreck was an indie rock band formed in Milwaukee, Wisconsin in 1988, and later based in Chicago. After releasing three albums the band split up in the mid-1990s, with singer/guitarist Dean Schlabowske going on to found The Waco Brothers.

== History ==
The band was formed in Milwaukee in 1988, and comprised Dean Schlabowske (later of The Waco Brothers) on electric guitar and vocals, Bart Flores on drums, and Keith Brammer (from Die Kreuzen and Boy Dirt Car) on bass guitar.

The band's first release was a self-titled EP on the Play It Again Sam label in 1989, in association with Wax Trax!, with Steve Albini producing. The Milwaukee Journal's Thor Christensen described the EP: "Guitars sound like drums, drums sound like machine guns, and vocalist Schlabowske sounds like he's just swallowed napalm". Debut album Soul Train followed in 1990, also produced by Albini, and described by Allmusic as "abstract, difficult songs...the work of a band that had no desire to compromise its creative vision". The band released another six songs on the House of Boris 12” EP in 1991, by which time Kurt Moore (The Won't, Primasonic) had joined on bass guitar.

The band recorded a second album for Wax Trax! (Your Monkey's on Fire), but it remained unreleased apart from advance cassette copies. The band re-recorded it as El Mundo De Los Niños, with production from Jon Langford of The Mekons, whom Schlabowske then joined in The Waco Brothers.

Schlabowske later formed Dollar Store.

== Discography ==
=== Albums ===
- Soul Train LP (1990), PIAS
- El Mundo De Los Niños CD (1994), C/Z

=== EPs ===
- Wreck 4-song 12" EP (1989), PIASTRA
- House of Boris (1991), Wax Trax!

=== Singles ===
- "Mikey" 7" single b/w "Funk 49" (1992)
