= Shuga Records =

Chicago-based record store and record label

Coordinates: 41°54′17.316″N 87°40′9.066″W

- Type: Private
- Industry: Record store
- Founded: February 2000, Chicago, United States
- Founder: Adam Rosen
- Headquarters: Chicago, United States
- Area served: Worldwide (ships to US and international destinations)
- Services: New and used music sales
- Owner: Shuga Records Inc.
- Website: shugarecords.com

Shuga Records is a Chicago-based record store and record label specializing in new and vintage rock, punk, indie, hip-hop, EDM, Shoegaze, Psychedelic, Noise, Metal, Neo Soul, collectible, and obscure vinyl records, cassettes and CDs.

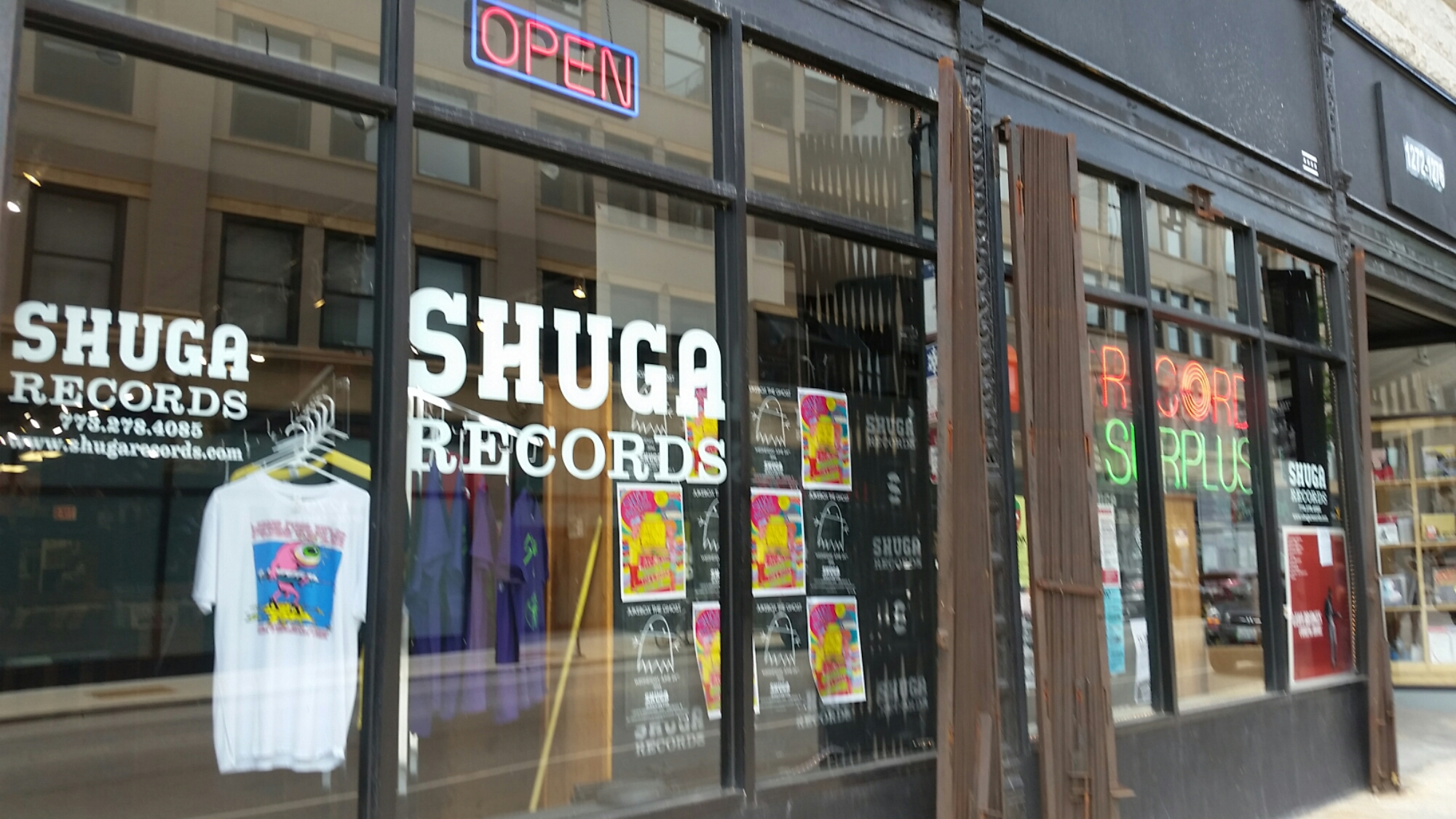
Shuga Records building at 1272 N Milwaukee Avenue.

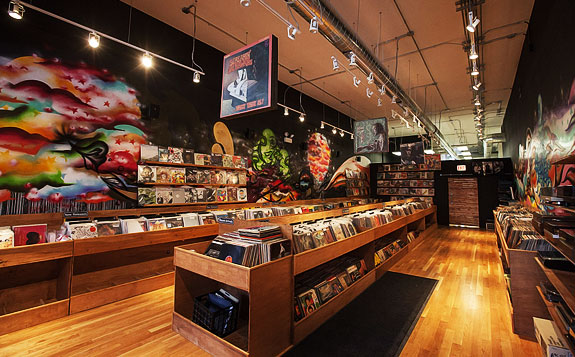
Inside the Shuga Records store

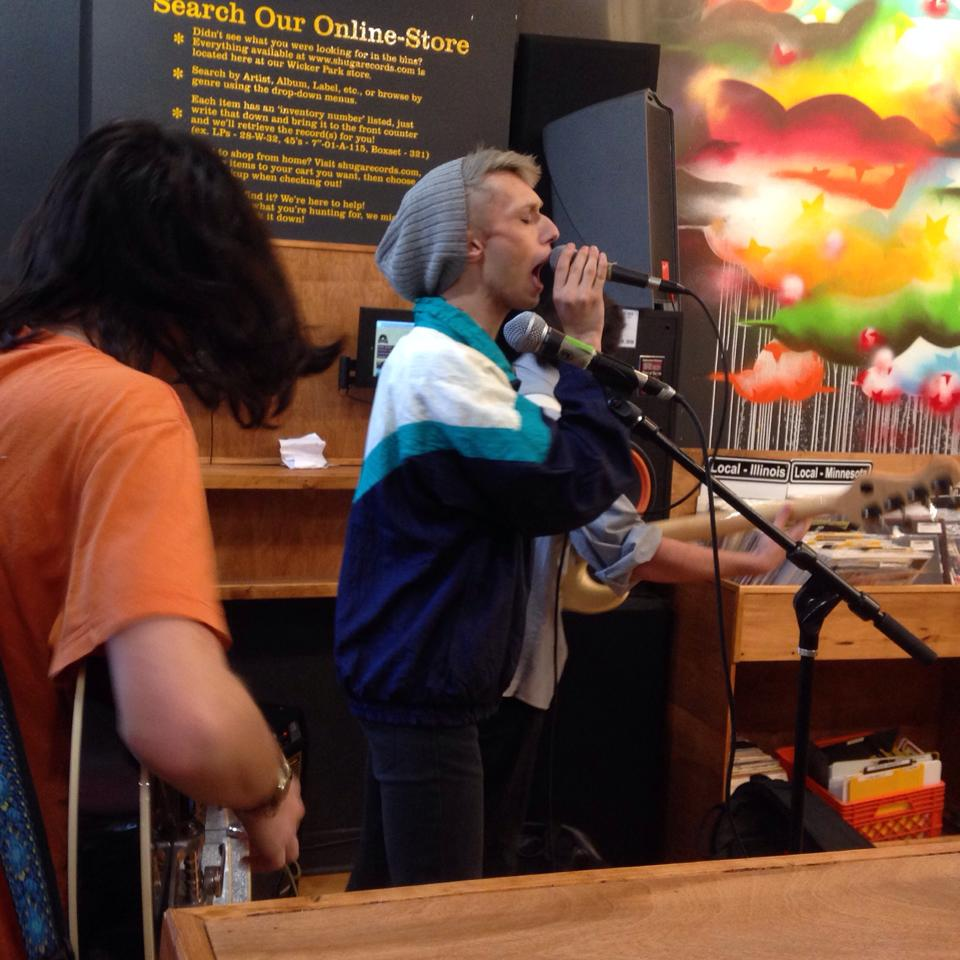
Yoko and the Oh No's performing an in-store concert at Shuga Records.

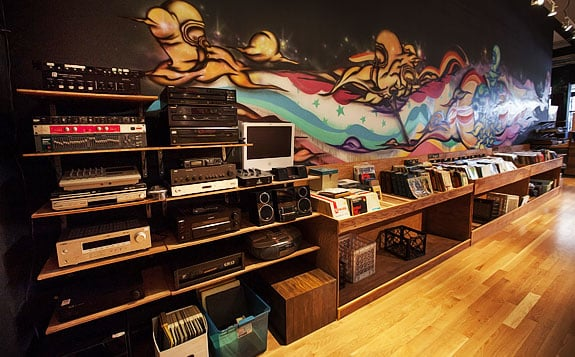
Electronic equipment for sale inside the Shuga Records store.

== History ==
=== Retail operations ===
The first retail location of Shuga Records opened in 2004 in Eden Prairie, Minnesota. In 2007 Shuga Records moved its retail location to Minneapolis, Minnesota, where it operated until 2012. Shuga Records currently operates its retail store and mail-based shipping business in the Wicker Park neighborhood of Chicago. The Chicago location opened for business in February 2015. Shuga Records maintains an extensive warehouse and retail presence with over half a million records. In May 2016 Shuga Records expanded into a second story loft apartment which is used as a warehouse space for online operations. By December 2022, Shuga Records was operating a second Chicago store at 3306 W. Armitage Avenue in Logan Square.

=== Record label ===
The "Shuga Records" record label was started in 2016. The debut release for the label was a self-titled vinyl reissue from the Chicago-based band Ne-Hi. Chicago music acts such as Mungion and Max Loebman have also released through the Shuga Records Label.

In 2017, Shuga Records announced the release of Multi-Tone Chicago Vol. 1: Max and Adam's Picks, a compilation album featuring songs from thirteen Chicago musical artists. The record was released in June 2017.

Later releases included a vinyl edition of Cloud Cruiser's debut album I: Capacity in 2020 and Flamingo Rodeo's Pontoon in 2022.

== Later activities ==
=== Noteworthy acquisitions ===
In 2014 an extremely rare Velvet Underground acetate record featuring early recordings of songs later to be featured on The Velvet Underground & Nico was put up for auction on eBay through Shuga Records. Only two copies of the record are known to exist.

=== Special events ===
Shuga Records often hosts special in-store events such as live concerts and artist record signing events. Some of the artists and bands who have had events at Shuga records are Boris, King Gizzard and the Lizard Wizard, and Schoolboy Q. The stage inside Shuga Records previously belonged to Atomic Records where bands such as Nirvana and Smashing Pumpkins had performed on it. In addition to artist events, Shuga Records annually participates in Record Store Day as well a pop-up shop at Pitchfork Music Festival. During its operation in Minneapolis, Minnesota, Shuga Records annually hosted "Hoolie Fest," a live concert festival featuring over 75 bands and artists.

Artists who have performed or participated in in-store event for Shuga Records include:

- Boris
- BØRNS
- The Foreign Resort
- GRIZFOLK
- Hello Ocho
- Jukebox the Ghost
- Kikagaku Moyo
- King Gizzard and the Lizard Wizard
- Kweku Collins
- Ne-Hi
- The Ready Set
- Schoolboy Q
- The Wonder Years
- X Ambassadors
- Yelawolf
- Yoko and the Oh No's
- Pete Yorn

== Discography and exclusives ==
Albums released and reissued on vinyl under the Shuga Records label include:

- Ne-Hi - Ne-Hi (Exclusive Reissue)
- Mungion - Scary Blankets
- Max Loebman - Wild One

== See also ==
- Online music store
- Record collecting
