= Rock for Kids =

- Company type: Non-profit organization
- Industry: Education
- Founded: 1988
- Headquarters: Chicago, IL
- Key people: Jam Productions, WXRT-FM, Metro Chicago
- Website: www.rockforkids.org

Rock for Kids is a nonprofit organization based in Chicago, Illinois. Honorary board members include Martin Atkins of Invisible Records, Andrew Bird, Jon Langford, Johnny Marr of Modest Mouse and the Smiths, Nan Warshaw co-owner of Bloodshot Records, and Joe Shanahan owner of Metro Chicago.

== Mission ==
Rock for Kids provides music education to underserved children in Chicago, sparking creativity and passion, teaching critical thinking, supporting academic achievement and enriching young lives.

== Organization history ==
Rock for Kids was founded in 1988 as "Christmas Is for Kids" by volunteers in Chicago's music and entertainment industry. Initially a grassroots effort to raise money for holiday gifts for homeless children, often by employees of local promoters Jam Productions, the charity changed its name and focus in 2000 to Rock for Kids. In response to music budget cuts in the schools, the founders of Rock for Kids changed their mission to provide music education to Chicago Public School students at risk and in need. Starting with one group of 20 students, Rock for Kids has grown to serve over 1000 students annually.

On July 22, 2010 Metro Chicago celebrated its 28th anniversary by releasing a live benefit compilation called Metro: The Official Bootleg Series, Volume 1 featuring The Flaming Lips, Guided By Voices, Sleater-Kinney, The Decemberists, Indigo Girls, Alejandro Escovedo, The Sea and Cake, Tortoise, Alkaline Trio, Billy Corgan, Jimmy Chamberlin and Kurt Elling. Proceeds from the sale of the compilation CD benefit Rock for Kids.

Rock for Kids is a licensed Illinois 501(c)(3) organization.

== Program ==
Rock for Kids supplies year-round music education classes to Chicago Public School students living and attending school in under resourced neighborhoods by contracting professional music teachers, purchasing instruments and sheet music and providing a comprehensive 32-week music education curriculum with measurable goals in the areas of: music theory and history, vocal technique, music analysis, public performance and creative and artistic development. Rock for Kids also offers Songwriting/Production classes and Blues workshop as these genres of music are underrepresented in education and are culturally relevant to the students involved.
