= Skull Orchard =

Studio album by Jon Langford
- Released: January 27, 1998
- Recorded: August 1997
- Genre: alternative rock folk rock
- Label: Sugar Free Records

Jon Langford chronology
| Skull Orchard (1998) | All the Fame of Lofty Deeds (2004) |

Skull Orchard is the debut solo album by Jon Langford, recorded in August 1997 and released on January 20, 1998 by Sugar Free Records, a Chicago-based label. Skull Orchard, described on its release in 1998 as Langford's most Welsh release ever, had two homonymically-linked themes: Wales and whales which came together in the "Youghal" track, about the filming of the 1956 movie Moby Dick in coastal Wales. In 2011 the album was re-recorded and re-issued with the title Skull Orchard Revisted by Langford backed by the Burlington Welsh Male Chorus, based in Toronto.

== Background ==
By the time of its release, The Skull Orchards, initially a songwriting project, had evolved into a full blown band with Langford on guitar and vocals, Chicago guitarist Mark Durante (ex-Revolting Cocks, KMFDM), drummer Steve Goulding (ex-Gang of Four, Graham Parker & the Rumour) and bass player Alan Doughty (ex-Jesus Jones). Among other musicians who took part in recording the album were Mekons' Sally Timms (backing vocals) and Rico Bell (accordion), Drag City Records artist Edith Frost, Bottle Rockets bassist Tom Ray and the Texas Rubies' Jane Baxter Miller.

Having lived in America for the previous five years, Skull Orchard saw Langford turning his attention back across the Atlantic to the country he grew up in. According to BBC Radio Wales, "seen through the eyes of an exile, South Wales is a sad, neglected place where mines and factories close down as toxic waste dumps and McDonalds appear out of nowhere. Only the defiant spirit of its people keeps the place alive". Wordy and angry the album's songs "reflect that spirit and represent a major departure for Langford's songwriting", according to Sassy Hicks of the BBC.

== Critical reception ==
Professional ratings
Review scores
| Source | Rating |
|---|---|
| AllMusic | 4/5 stars |
| Entertainment Weekly | B+ |
| New Musical Express | 7/10 stars |
| The New Rolling Stone Album Guide | 3.5/5 stars |
| The Village Voice | A– |

AllMusic called it "a smart, stripped-down collection of tuneful rockers that bitterly reflect on the state of his native Wales" and "a worthy addition to the Mekons/Waco Brothers legacy". According to NME, Skull Orchard is Langford's "irate musings upon his dispirited, neglected homeland; a record which celebrates Welshness against a backdrop of closing mines and factories and grinding poverty". It was "all the more an achievement for a man who has been living in America for the past five years," the reviewer wrote on July 6, 1998. The New York Times characterised the band as 'straightforward' and 'streamlined', describing the songs of the album as "country-rock with an infusion of The Who". "Smart, cynical and still impassioned about the state of humanity, Langford has recharged his music by stripping away any indulgences," critic Jon Pareles wrote. Robert Christgau of Village Voice (giving the album the A− rating) remarked: "Anyone who's tried to keep up with <Langford's> one-liners knows he's an articulate bastard, but he's better off when he doesn't have to get to the end in 75 words or less... Here he runs on, confessing his antisocial tendencies like the singer-songwriter he temporarily is without forgetting that capitalism is antisocial too".

== Musicians ==
- Fred Armisen - percussion
- Jane Baxter-Miller - vocals
- Rico Bell - accordion
- Tracy Dear - mandolin
- Alan Doughty - bass guitar, vocals
- Mark Durante - guitar
- Lu Edmonds - vocals
- Edith Frost - vocals
- Steve Goulding - drums
- John Hiatt - vocals
- Jon Langford - etching, guitar, vocals
- Paul Mertens - brass, flute (alto), overdubs, sax (baritone)
- Tom Ray - ukulele
- John Rice - fiddle
- Dean Schlabowske - vocals

=== Personnel ===
- Mike Hagler - engineer, recorder
- Ken Sluiter - engineer, mastering, mixing, recorder
- Casey Orr - photography
- Marty Perez - photography
- Mark Price - translation

== Track list ==
Skull Orchard

| No. | Title | Length |
|---|---|---|
| 1. | "Tubby Brothers" | 2:25 |
| 2. | "Penny Arcades" | 3:57 |
| 3. | "Butter Song" | 3:15 |
| 4. | "Sentimental Marching Song" | 4:26 |
| 5. | "Youghal" | 3:10 |
| 6. | "Trapdoor" | 2:44 |
| 7. | "Inside the Whale" | 3:33 |
| 8. | "I Am the Law" | 2:14 |
| 9. | "Pill Sailor" | 2:29 |
| 10. | "The Last Count" | 3:37 |
| 11. | "My Own Worst Enemy" | 3:03 |
| 12. | "<Untitled>" | 0:16 |
| 13. | "I'm Stopping This Train" | 2:47 |
| 14. | "Deep Sea Diver" | 3:52 |
| 15. | "Tom Jones Levitation" | 4:29 |
| 16. | "Last Song" | 1:04 |

Skull Orchard Revisted

| No. | Title | Length |
|---|---|---|
| 1. | "Tubby Brothers" | 2:23 |
| 2. | "Verdun" | 3:25 |
| 3. | "Last Count" | 4:27 |
| 4. | "Butter Song" | 3:16 |
| 5. | "Sentimental Marching Song" | 4:17 |
| 6. | "Youghal" | 3:10 |
| 7. | "Trap Door" | 2:46 |
| 8. | "Inside The Whale" | 3:33 |
| 9. | "I am The Law" | 2:18 |
| 10. | "Green Valleys" | 3:02 |
| 11. | "Pill Sailor" | 2:30 |
| 12. | "Penny Arcades" | 3:55 |
| 13. | "My Own Worst Enemy" | 3:06 |
| 14. | "<Untitled>" | 0:16 |
| 15. | "I'm Stopping This Train" | 2:46 |
| 16. | "Deep Sea Diver" | 3:49 |
| 17. | "Tom Jones Levitation" | 4:28 |
| 18. | "The Ballad Of Solomon Jones" | 3:30 |
| 19. | "Message from Newport" | 1:04 |

All songs written by Jon Langford.
