= Electric Waco Chair =

Studio album by the Waco Brothers
- Released: 2000
- Genre: Rock
- Length: 47:43
- Label: Bloodshot
- Producers: The Waco Brothers; Ken Sluiter

The Waco Brothers chronology
Wacoworld (1999)	Electric Waco Chair (2000)	New Deal (2002)

Electric Waco Chair is an album by the Chicago-based band the Waco Brothers, released in 2000. The band supported the album with a world tour that included shows with Sally Timms.

== Production ==
The Waco Brothers considered the band to be their main musical endeavor at the time of the album's recording sessions, rather than a side project. They regarded the music to be rock rather than alternative country, and tried to keep it fresh by maintaining the loose spirit of their early days. Many of the songs are about the concerns of the working class. The protagonist of "Never Real" is forced to leave his neighborhood due to gentrification. "When I Get My Rewards" is a cover of the Paul Kennerley song. Kelly Hogan contributed vocals to "Circle Tour".

== Critical reception ==
Professional ratings
Review scores
Source	Rating
AllMusic	4/5 stars
Robert Christgau	A−
Entertainment Weekly	B+
Lincoln Journal Star	5/5 stars
Los Angeles Daily News	3.5/4 stars
Pitchfork	7.2/10
Rolling Stone	3/5 stars
Winnipeg Sun	4/5 stars

Robert Christgau said that "a questionable vision of country music that dates back to Fear and Whiskey goes around and comes around as Langford and company realize that they've hung around long enough to turn into the desperate working stiffs their faux honky-tonk imagines." Pitchfork noted that, "where American revivalists are frustratingly serious about their music, treating country like holy writ, the Waco Brothers don't have the same stake in it... Because it's not their history, they can treat it as a contemporary event and return it to the go-for-broke fun spirit behind all that worship old-time tuneage gets subjected to." The San Francisco Examiner wrote that "Langford's rants are balanced by Dean Schlabowske's laconic backwoods ramblings."

Entertainment Weekly concluded that the album "hits a peak of jangling catchiness with 'Walking on Hell's Roof Looking at the Flowers'." The Lincoln Journal Star stated that Langford "always has infused everything he does—from Bob Wills covers to his own sharply written songs—with a gleeful but righteous indignation, full of both rage and great good humor." Rolling Stone deemed the songs "solid, hearty pieces of roots music that transcend the despair." The Tallahassee Democrat and Chicago Sun-Times included Electric Waco Chair on their lists of the best albums of 2000.

AllMusic wrote that "the band sounds tighter, stronger, and more expressive than ever before."

== Track listing ==
No.	Title	Length
1.	"It's Not Enough"	3:37
2.	"Make Things Happen"	4:21
3.	"Where the Mighty Fall"	3:24
4.	"Jamaican Radio Obituary"	3:33
5.	"Walking on Hell's Roof Looking at the Flowers"	3:03
6.	"Cornered"	3:28
7.	"Where in the World"	5:31
8.	"When I Get My Rewards"	3:50
9.	"Circle Tour"	3:27
10.	"Nothing to Say"	2:49
11.	"Fox River"	4:03
12.	"Dragging My Own Tombstone"	3:44
13.	"Never Real"	2:53
Total length:		47:43
