= Going Down In History =

Studio album by The Waco Brothers
- Released: February 26, 2016
- Studio: Kingsize Soundlabs
- Genre: Country rock
- Length: 28:55
- Label: Bloodshot
- Producer: Mike Hagler

The Waco Brothers chronology
Great Chicago Fire (2012)	Going Down In History (2016)

Going Down In History is the tenth studio album by country rock band the Waco Brothers, released on February 26, 2016, on Bloodshot Records. It was their first album of new material in over a decade.

== Critical reception ==
Professional ratings
Aggregate scores
Source	Rating
Metacritic	80/100
Review scores
Source	Rating
AllMusic	4/5 stars
Blurt	4/5 stars
Classic Rock	4/5 stars
Exclaim!	7/10
Irish Times	3/5 stars
Noisey	A–
Pitchfork	6.7/10
PopMatters	7/10
Record Collector	3/5 stars

Based on 12 critic reviews, Going Down In History has a score of 80 out of 100 on Metacritic, indicating "generally favorable reviews". AllMusic's Mark Deming gave the album 4 out of 5 stars, calling it "short and bittersweet" and "the sound of a great band evolving with the times, even as those times try their soul and conscience."

== Track listing ==
All tracks are written by Waco Brothers, except where noted.

No.	Title	Length
1.	"DIYBYOB"	2:58
2.	"We Know It"	3:12
3.	"Receiver"	2:47
4.	"Building Our Own Prison"	2:46
5.	"All or Nothing" (Ronnie Lane and Steve Marriott)	2:46
6.	"Had Enough"	2:13
7.	"Lucky Fool"	2:54
8.	"Going Down in History"	3:05
9.	"Devil's Day"	3:18
10.	"Orphan Song" (Jon Dee Graham)	2:45
Total length:		28:55
