= The Yawpers =

American band

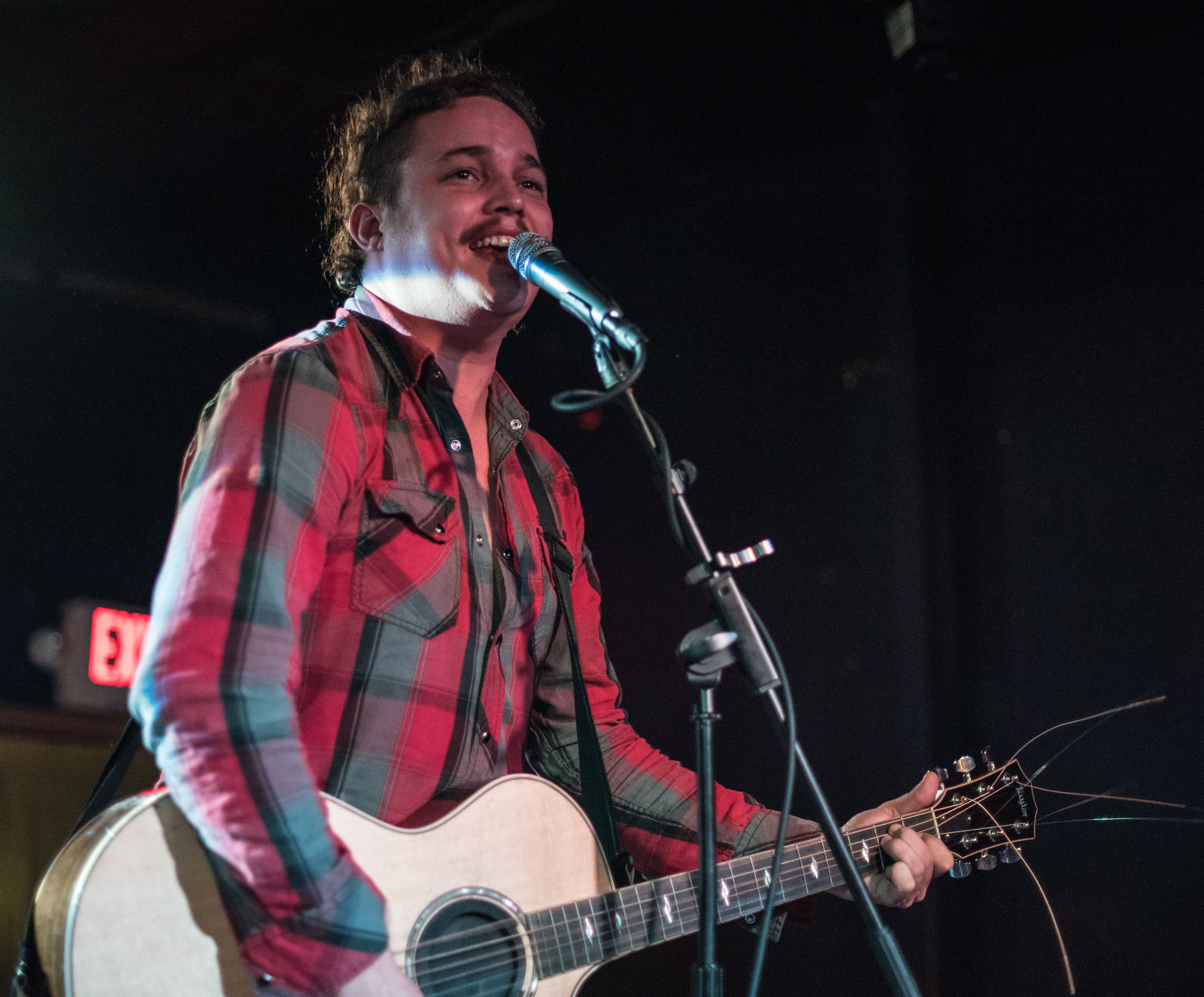
- Nate Cook of The Yawpers, Rock & Roll Hotel (Washington DC) December 2015

Background information
- Origin: Denver, Colorado, U.S.
- Genres: Rock and roll Americana; Punk rock Blues rock
- Years active: 2011–present
- Label: Bloodshot Records
- Members: Nate Cook; Jesse Parmet; Alex Koshak
- Past members: James Hale; Adam Perry; Dave Romano; Noah Shomberg
- Website: TheYawpers.com

The Yawpers are a three-piece rock and roll band from Denver, Colorado. Their name is derived from a Walt Whitman poem, entitled "Song of Myself" from Leaves of Grass: "I sound my barbaric yawp over the roofs of the world." The Yawpers play in a unique setting of two acoustic guitar players and drummer, yet their music is played with "raucous glee comparable to seeing a metal band".

== History ==
The Yawpers is composed of Nate Cook on lead vocals and guitar, Jesse Parmet on slide guitar and harmonies, and Alex Koshak on drums. Both Cook and Parmet play acoustic guitars, and their music has been described as cow-punk. Cook and Parmet had played together for a few years, playing together in the band Ego vs. Id, before forming The Yawpers. Cook had a solo residency at a bar and Parmet joined him.

After self-releasing their debut album, Capon Crusade, Bloodshot Records saw the band play at the 2015 South by Southwest music festival in Austin, Texas and immediately signed the band to their label.

Cook grew up in Texas, which influences his sound. The band is based in Denver, Colorado.

In 2013, the Yawpers self-released a bootleg covers record called Good Songs/Shitty Versions, which included covers of songs by Motörhead, Ween, Elvis Presley, The Coasters and Aerosmith. It was recorded at Bill Douglass' Colorado Springs, Colorado, studio, Royal Recording, during the course of a day.

On October 30, 2015, The Yawpers released their sophomore album, American Man, on Bloodshot Records. American Man is the band's first album released under Bloodshot Records. The album was co-produced by Cracker's Johnny Hickman and was recorded at The Blasting Room in Fort Collins, Colorado – the studio that is run by drummer Bill Stevenson of the punk rock band, Descendents. On September 26, 2015, Rolling Stone released an article of their song "Burdens", saying that "the guys bang out a Springsteen-worthy tribute to escaping the city limits of one's hometown."

In October 2017, The Yawpers released their second record for Bloodshot called Boy in a Well. The record was recorded in Chicago and was produced by Tommy Stinson from The Replacements and Alex Hall, known for his work with JD McPherson, Pokey LaFarge. The record is a concept album, and tells the story of a boy who lives in France during World War I, who was abandoned in a well by his mother. Cook wrote some of the lyrics with his father, a poet and psychiatrist, and said that the writing of the dark material reflected processing childhood sexual abuse by an older man when he was young. The themes of abandonment and relationships reflected Cook's marriage and subsequent divorce. Graphic artist J.D. Wilkes from band, The Legendary Shack Shakers, created a comic book that accompanied the release of the album. The cover art of the record is also by Wilkes. The record has an overall sound that incorporates rockabilly with rock and roll and punk rock. The record incorporates Cook's divorce.

The song "Doin' It Right" was featured in the Showtime TV series, Ray Donovan. It was the end credits song for the season five, episode 10 called "Bob the Builder".

The Yawpers have played shows with Delta Spirit, Lucero, The Reverend Horton Heat, The Black Angels, Wanda Jackson, Cracker, and Blind Pilot, and they have toured the US with Nashville Pussy, Supersuckers and The Blasters. They tour extensively.

== Discography ==
=== Albums ===
- 2012: Capon Crusade (self-released)
- 2013: Good Songs/Shitty Versions (self-released)
- 2015: American Man (Bloodshot Records)
- 2017: Boy in a Well (Bloodshot Records)
- 2019: Human Question (Bloodshot Records)

=== EPs ===
- 2011: Savage Blue (Adventure Records Ltd.)

=== Singles ===
- 2015: Deacon Brodie (Bloodshot Records)
- 2015: 3 Days Sober / If I Should Fall from Grace with God by Deer Tick (Bloodshot Records) – from Bloodshot Six Pack to Go: Working Songs For the Drinking Class box set
- 2017: Mon Dieu / Ace of Spades (Bloodshot Records)
