= Richard LaValliere =

American punk and experimental musician

- Richard LaValliere

Background information
- Born: February 20, 1953
- Origin: Sheboygan, Wisconsin, Brooklyn, New York
- Died: February 8, 2012 (aged 58)
- Genres: Punk, rock
- Years active: 1969-2012
- Formerly of: The Dirty Shames, Arthur, Radio Boys, In A Hot Coma, The Haskels, The Oil Tasters, Life & Death Troubadours, Scorpio Triple Forbidden Tattoo, Flip Top Five, The Brooklyn Barn Burners, Scorpio Thunderbodlt and Jones & Karloff.

Richard LaValliere (February 20, 1953 – February 8, 2012) was a Sheboygan, Wisconsin born musician, and founding member of Milwaukee bands such as, The Dirty Shames, Arthur, Radio Boys, In A Hot Coma, The Haskels, The Oil Tasters, The Lonesome Desperados, The Barn Burners, The Flip Top Five, Triple Forbidden Taboo, Scorpio Thunderbolt, Pölkafinger and Jones & Karloff. He was renowned for his unique vocal style and songwriting, humorous and clever lyrics and stage persona. A multi-instrumentalist, he played bass guitar, lead guitar and keyboards.

== Career ==
LaValliere was active in Milwaukee's emerging punk scene by the mid-1970s. In A Hot Coma, which included LaValliere and Jill Kossoris, developed into the Haskels, with LaValliere contributing bass, vocals and songwriting. His contemporaries later recalled his songs and stage presence as bringing an eccentric and surreal element to the group. He also performed in the Barnburners, a short-lived post-Haskels group that included his brother Gerard LaValliere and Mike Clancy.

In 1980, LaValliere and drummer Guy Hoffman formed the Oil Tasters with saxophonist Caleb Alexander Lentzner. Hoffman later recalled that he and LaValliere had developed a strong rhythmic partnership in the Haskels and that the Oil Tasters grew out of that collaboration. The guitarless trio combined LaValliere's bass and vocals with saxophone and drums, recording several singles before releasing their self-titled full-length album, Oil Tasters, on Thermidor Records in 1982.

After the Oil Tasters, LaValliere continued to pursue projects that differed considerably in style and format. He briefly performed with Kevn Kinney in the Lonesome Desperados, an acoustic duo that Kinney later recalled played only two shows and a picnic.

LaValliere moved to Brooklyn in 1987, taking with him the Life and Death Troubadours name from a Milwaukee project. In Milwaukee, the group included Steve Whalen (d. 2025) on drums and Jerome Brish, aka "Presley Haskel" (d. 1991) on guitar; a poster for the band's "live electric debut" advertised the trio performing at Café Voltaire in Milwaukee.

LaValliere later performed with Pölkafinger, a Brooklyn-based trio that also included Soraya Finger and combined punk, metal and polka. In 2009, the group made its Milwaukee debut at Shank Hall, sharing a bill with the Blackholes Power Polka Machine.

His later creative work extended beyond performing in bands. LaValliere co-wrote the short story "Class Reunion" with author Michael McComas; it was published in McComas's 2011 collection Unforgettable: Harrowing Futures, Horrors and (Dark) Humor. LaValliere also collaborated with McComas on the independent film Time Trek, appearing as the "Leader of the Cave People" and composing and performing music for the film. He died before completing the score, but recordings he left behind were subsequently assembled for the soundtrack.

== Legacy ==
LaValliere remained an influential figure in Milwaukee's early punk and alternative music scene. In a retrospective on the Haskels, Shepherd Express described the Haskels and the Oil Tasters as looming large in the history of Milwaukee alternative music, noting LaValliere's songwriting and distinctive bass playing. Shepherd Express described the Oil Tasters as a path-finding trio and reported that plans for an Oil Tasters reunion had been underway shortly before his death. Kevn Kinney, who worked as road crew for both groups before forming Drivin' N Cryin', credited LaValliere with having a substantial influence on his own musical development.

Following LaValliere's death, Milwaukee musicians organized the 2012 Lest We Forget concert commemorating deceased members of the city's original punk scene. The memorial project subsequently continued through a Facebook community documenting musicians and other participants from that era.

LaValliere also figures prominently in later histories of Milwaukee's early punk scene. ''Brick Through the Window: An Oral History of Punk Rock, New Wave & Noise in Milwaukee, 1964–1984'' (2017) draws on original interviews with LaValliere in documenting the period. He and his work with the Haskels and Oil Tasters are also featured in the documentary ''Taking the City by Storm: The Birth of Milwaukee's Punk Scene'', directed by his brother Doug LaValliere.
