= Great Pop Things =

Great Pop Things was a comic strip by Colin B. Morton and Chuck Death (the latter a pseudonym for the musician and painter Jon Langford of The Mekons). It first appeared in Record Mirror in 1987, transferred to the New Musical Express in 1991, and was also published in LA Weekly, Chicago's New City and very briefly The Onion.

The strip was a satirical faux-history of rock and pop music. It lampooned many fashionable groups and singers of the time, as well as presenting the "stories" of established stars. Morton and Langford had a particular liking for rock stars of the 1970s, and presented multi-part histories of best-selling artists including Led Zeppelin, The Sex Pistols, Bruce Springsteen, Frank Zappa and the Rolling Stones. One of their most featured characters was David Bowie, invariably referred to as "Dave" and depicted (even as a child) with a lightning bolt design on his forehead, similar to the make-up he wore on the cover of his Aladdin Sane LP. Unlike the real-life Bowie, "Dave" was shown to be particularly proud of his early single "The Laughing Gnome", which was described as "a mod anthem" and referred to at every opportunity.

The history presented by the strip was hugely inconsistent (even from one panel to the next), though one unchanging "fact" was that Elvis Presley was "the second white man to invent rock 'n' roll". (The first was Bill Haley, though as one strip notes, "he wasn't very good at it".) Other running jokes in the strip included a blanket denial that anyone involved in rock music had ever taken illegal substances, the conflation of all progressive rock bands into a single group with an ever-changing line-up, and the oft-made claim that punk rock originated in the writers' home county of Gwent.

Colin B Morton, otherwise known as Carlton B Morgan, is still based in Newport and contributed to Sound Nation magazine from 2003 to 2004.

In 1998, a complete collection of the strips was published with an introduction by rock critic Greil Marcus. A British TV series of 2008, Star Stories, bears more than a passing resemblance to Great Pop Things''. In 2011 Great Pop Things was included in list of 60 Favorite Music books by Pitchfork.

== Anthologies ==
- Great Pop Things (Penguin, 1992, ISBN 0-14-017156-8 )
- Great Pop Things: The Real History of Rock and Roll from Elvis to Oasis (Verse Chorus Press, 1998, ISBN 1-891241-08-7 )
