= Al Scorch =

American musician

- Born: Chicago, Illinois U.S.
- Occupations: Singer/songwriter; Banjo player Guitarist
- Years active: 2004-present
- Website: AlScorch.com

Al Scorch is an American singer-songwriter, banjo player, and guitarist. His music incorporates country, punk, folk, bluegrass, rock, and blues.

== Early life and education ==
Scorch grew up in Chicago's northwest side, in the community of Dunning. His father was musical and played the piano.

Scorch learned how to play the guitar when he was 10 or 11 years old, then switched to the banjo around the age of 12. He said his mother always had a banjo in the house and would play it periodically.

== Career ==
For Scorch's 2012 record, Tired Ghostly Town, on Hewhocorrupts Inc. he donated half of the proceeds to charity. He wrote the record during a workshopping experience in a Georgia farmhouse. The record is a mixture of bluegrass and punk.

In early 2015, Scorch had a monthly residency at The Empty Bottle which was called Al Scorch's Winter Slumber.

In 2015, along with his friends from Old Lazarus' Harp, a local music collective, Scorch helped to organize the Chicago Square Dance Summit at The Empty Bottle in Chicago, which included performances by Mulefoot, Can I Get An Amen, Broken Down Gamblers from New Orleans, Donkey Nation from Columbus, Ohio.

In celebration of his 2016 record release of Circle Round the Signs on Bloodshot Records, Scorch did a bike tour of five different record stores. He rode his bike to each venue, giving performances at each location. The record received positive reviews. The album features a Woody Guthrie cover of the 1944 song, "Slipknot."

Scorch has a long-term collaboration with musician, Laura Carter from the bands Elf Power and Neutral Milk Hotel, either in Atlanta or Chicago.

Scorch and his band, Al Scorch and the Country Soul Ensemble, tour extensively across the United States, Canada, and Europe.

In 2023. Scorch started to co-host a television series named Kill Your Lawn with his friend Joey Santore. In the series they help homeowners to create biodiverse and ecologically sound outdoor spaces by replacing their lawns with native plants.

== Personal life ==
Scorch is an avid cyclist. He is part of the freak-bike club Rat Patrol in Chicago, and was previously part of Critical Mass.

== Discography ==
LPs

- 2012: Tired Ghostly Town by Al Scorch & the Country Soul Ensemble (Plan-it-x South)
- 2014: Al Scorch's Moving Company Vol. 1 (Self-released)
- 2015: Live at the Spirit Store by Al Scorch Country Soul Ensemble (Gray Sky Micro Press)
- 2016: Circle Round the Signs (Bloodshot Records)

EPs

- 2009: This Lonesome World... (Let's Pretend Records, No Breaks Records)

7" Singles

- 2008: Al Scorch And The Cold Dead Hands (Half-Day Records)
- 2010: On The Straight And Low: – Lonesome Low by Al Scorch / Straighten Out My Laig by Jimmy Driftwood (Orange Twin Records)
- 2013: Four Way Split 7 Inch Tribute To Dead Moo – Point Of No Return by Nervosas / I Won't Be The One by Landlord / A Miss Of You by Dead Dog / It's OK by Al Scorch
- 2015: Too Drunk to Fuck by Elizabeth Cook / Six Pack by Al Scorch (Bloodshot Records) – from Bloodshot Six Pack to Go: Working Songs For the Drinking Class box set
- 2015: Tour 7" – Hold On Right by Al Scorch / Country Cliche by David Dondero (Let's Pretend Records)
