= Metro: The Official Bootleg Series, Volume 1 =

Metro: The Official Bootleg Series, Volume 1 was released on July 22, 2010, as Metro Chicago celebrated its 28th anniversary by issuing a live benefit compilation album. It featured the Flaming Lips, Guided by Voices, Sleater-Kinney, the Decemberists, Indigo Girls, Alejandro Escovedo, the Sea and Cake, Tortoise, Alkaline Trio, Billy Corgan, Jimmy Chamberlin, and Kurt Elling. Proceeds from the sale of the compilation CD benefited Rock For Kids.

== Track listing ==
No.	Title	Artist	Length
1.	"Race for the Prize"	The Flaming Lips	5:45
2.	"Fair Touching"	Guided By Voices	3:13
3.	"You're No Rock N' Roll Fun"	Sleater-Kinney	2:32
4.	"We Both Go Down Together"	The Decemberists	3:02
5.	"Galileo"	Indigo Girls	4:26
6.	"I'll Follow You Down"	Alejandro Escovedo	4:35
7.	"Jacking The Ball"	The Sea and Cake	3:05
8.	"Along the Banks of Rivers"	Tortoise	5:51
9.	"Radio"	Alkaline Trio	4:21
10.	"Freedom"	Billy Corgan, Jimmy Chamberlin and Kurt Elling	4:34
