= Joey Santore =

Amateur botanist and YouTuber

Joey Santore and Tony Santoro (born 1982 or 1983) are the Internet aliases of an American amateur naturalist who runs the YouTube channel Crime Pays But Botany Doesn't. He is known for his "Bill Swerski-esque" Chicago accent and his frequent use of profanity when discussing plant species.

== Early life and education ==
Born to an elementary school teacher mother and a father who left his family when Santore was one year old, he took his last name from his grandmother who was an immigrant from Italy. He was raised in La Grange, Illinois and spent his childhood in Chicago where he showed an interest in science from a young age, frequenting the Field Museum and growing trees in the family backyard. He attended and was subsequently kicked out of military school as a teenager and became involved in the punk scene.

He spent the next three years traveling across the United States by freight train, eventually attending Pima Community College, where an astronomy textbook reignited his interest in the sciences. Subsequently, in 2006, he signed up for some classes at a San Francisco community college, but left after a semester in order to focus on his "nonacademic" pastime of plant ecology with an additional geology focus.

== Career ==
Santore began working as a freight train driver for Union Pacific in 2006 while conducting trips to record native plants species in the local area as well as on international trips. A video he made on August 15, 2019, involving helping a sick coyote pup went viral and received over 8 million views.

On the channel Crime Pays But Botany Doesn't, Santore's videos focus on a self-described "lowbrow approach to plant ecology" that facilitates his traveling to various environments, which he records in photos, videos, and a podcast. He also creates hand-drawn stickers of flowers to sell online. Since the success of his channel, he stopped working as a driver in order to travel internationally full-time as an amateur ecologist, officially quitting in 2019.

In late 2022, Santore began a partnership with the company Swamp Fly in order to produce a television series named Kill Your Lawn, in which Santore, together with his friend and co-host Al Scorch, helps homeowners to create biodiverse and ecologically sound outdoor spaces by replacing their lawns with native plants.

In May 2023, Santore recorded a viral video of a snapping turtle sunning itself on a rusted chain in the Chicago River, which Scorch named "Chonkosaurus". The video demonstrated the great improvement in the health of the river which only decades before was heavily polluted.

=== Ecological trips ===
In 2017, Santore traveled to Texas and explored the plants in the region around Big Bend and the Buda Formation. He returned to the state in 2019 to observe the Catahoula Formation region and the land near the Rio Grande.

In 2025 his first book was published, Concrete Botany: The Ecology of Plants in the Age of Human Disturbance. It received positive reviews from both the academic and popular plant communities for continuing his informal style in print, as well as his passionate advocation.

== Personal life ==
Santore lives in South Texas.

== Bibliography ==
- — (May 10, 2022). Crime Pays But Art Doesn't. Pacific Street Publishing. p. 143. ISBN 9780999896075.
