= KatJonBand =

- Genres: Alternative rock, alternative country
- Years active: 2005–2008
- Labels: Carrot Top Records
- Members: Jon Langford, Kat Ex (Katherina Bornefeld)

KatJonBand was a collaborative musical project between Jon Langford (guitarist for British band the Mekons) and Kat Ex (Katherina Bornefeld, drummer for Dutch band the Ex). After collaborating on and off for decades, Langford and Ex decided to write and record songs together in 2004 after Langford performed at one of the Ex's live shows in Amsterdam. They debuted the project in 2005, touring Germany and Austria, before recording 10 songs together and releasing them as KatJonBand's eponymous debut album in 2008.

== KatJonBand (2008) ==
KatJonBand

Studio album by KatJonBand
- Released: September 23, 2008
- Genre: Alternative country, folk rock
- Label: Carrot Top Records

KatJonBand released their only album, also called KatJonBand, on September 23, 2008, on Carrot Top Records.

Professional ratings
Review scores
Source	Rating
The A.V. Club	B+
Daily Herald	(positive)
PopMatters	7/10 stars
Robert Christgau	(choice cut)
Spin	5/10 stars

1. Do You?
2. Albion
3. Limbo
4. Machine Gun & The Ugly Doll
5. Conquered
6. Bad Apples
7. Crackheads Beware
8. Moonscape
9. Hey You Don't Love Me
10. Red Flag
