= The Scotland Yard Gospel Choir =

American indie pop band

- Origin: Chicago, US
- Genres: Indie pop
- Years active: 2001–present
- Labels: Bloodshot Records; Fashion Brigade
- Members: Elia Einhorn; Mary Ralph; Ethan Adelsman; Jay Santana; Mark Yoshizumi; Alison Hinderliter; Sam Johnson; Matt Priest
- Past members: Sam Koentopp; Ellen O'Hayer; Matthew Kerstein; Devon Bryant

The Scotland Yard Gospel Choir is an American indie pop band from Chicago.

== History ==
The Scotland Yard Gospel Choir was formed in 2001 by two college graduates with degrees in music. Despite the name, none of the members are from Scotland Yard or London and they do not play gospel music. Matthew Kerstein and Elia Einhorn initially released the four-track recording Do You Still Stick Out in the Crowd, then expanded to a four-piece by adding Ellen O'Hayer and Sam Koentopp, before releasing the single "Jennie That Cries". The group began playing locally in Chicago, soon opening for Arcade Fire, Of Montreal, the Walkmen, the Fiery Furnaces, and Jay Bennett. In late 2003, they released a debut album, titled I Bet you Say That to All The Boys. In 2005, Kerstein and Koentopp left to form a new band, called Brighton MA. Einhorn continued to front SYGC, with their second release, Scotland Yard Gospel Choir, coming out on Bloodshot Records in 2007.

On September 24, 2009, the band was involved in a major automobile accident while on tour. Their tour van's tire split and the vehicle rolled several times. All members survived.

== Band members ==
Current members

- Elia Einhorn – vocals, guitar
- Mary Ralph – guitar, vocals
- Ethan Adelsman – violin, vocals, guitar
- Jay Santana – drums
- Mark Yoshizumi – bass
- Alison Hinderliter – keys
- Sam Johnson – trumpet, vocals
- Matt Priest – trombone, vocals

Past members

- Sam Koentopp – drums
- Ellen O'Hayer – cello, bass, vocals
- Matthew Kerstein – guitar, vocals
- Devon Bryant – bass

== Discography ==
Albums

- I Bet You Say That to All the Boys (2003)
- The Scotland Yard Gospel Choir (2007)
- ...and the Horse You Rode in On (2009)

Singles

- "Jennie That Cries"/"Not Helicopters" (2002)
- "I Never Thought I Could Feel This Way for a Boy"/"A Good Kind of Crazy" (2003)
- "Clark & Belmont" (2016)
