= Couch Flambeau =

American punk rock band

- Origin: Milwaukee, Wisconsin
- Genres: Punk rock
- Years active: 1981–present
- Label: It's Only a Record Records
- Members: Jay Tiller, Neil Socol, Rusty Olson
- Past members: Ron Faiola, Joe Hausch, Meredith Young

Couch Flambeau is an American punk rock band, formed in 1981 in Milwaukee, Wisconsin. The band is known for the biting wit of their lyrics. They have released four full length albums: Mammal Insect Marriage (1983) (on Ludwig Van Ear Records), The Day the Music Died (1985) and Ghostride (1989) (both on It's Only a Record Records), and a self-titled CD (1998). They have also released two tapes, Curiosity Rocks (1982 - allegedly recorded in only 6 hours) and Rock With Your Sock On (1987), as well as an EP, Models (1987). And, finally, a 37-song career overview entitled I Did a Power Slide in the Taco Stand: Anthology 1982-2001 was released in 2004.

Steve Albini, the famed punk rock musician and recording engineer, said the group played "good funny music". Albini also played with Tiller in the band Army.

The band line-up as of 2004 was Jay Tiller on vocals and guitar, Neil Socol on bass, and Rusty on drums.

Couch Flambeau was formed by two Greendale, Wisconsin, High School friends, guitarist Jay Tiller and drummer Ron Faiola (a.k.a. Ron Ford/Giant Wow) in 1980. Their first shows were in the fall of 1981 at the University of Wisconsin Milwaukee's dormitories under the name Couch Potatoes. For these shows, Tiller and Faiola would wear pyjamas and paper bags over their heads while playing early versions of songs that ended up on the first Couch Potatoes release, Curiosity Rocks.

By the spring of 1982, bassist Neil Socol was added to the lineup and the Couch Potatoes played an early gig at the Starship, one of only two Milwaukee punk clubs. Two songs ("Mobile Home" and "I'm a Waiter") recorded at that show became DJ favorites on the fledgling college radio station WMSE. Constant airplay earned the Couch Potatoes a large cult following in Milwaukee, which led to more local shows and the recording of the "Curiosity Rocks" cassette release in the fall of 1982.

Eventually the band decided to replace the name Couch Potatoes (based on characters in a Robert Armstrong "Mickey Rat" comic book) with a more "original" name. Faiola came up with Couch Flambeau after seeing a Canadian fire prevention movie where a cat goes looking for "mouse flambeau."

1982 to 1986 were the band's most active years in Milwaukee, which found them headlining clubs and opening concerts for the Violent Femmes, The Replacements, The Damned, and the Butthole Surfers. They also introduced Evanston, Illinois's Big Black to Milwaukee audiences at the legendary Cafe Voltaire.

During the Models sessions in 1986, Faiola left the band to pursue a film career and Madison, Wisconsin drummer Meredith Young (Appliances SFB) played a few shows with Couch Flambeau until Tiller's art school friend Joe Hausch joined in late 1986. While Hausch played the live Flambeau shows, Tiller played the drums on studio recordings. Hausch left the band in late 1994 and current drummer Rusty has been with Flambeau since then.

== Discography ==
=== Albums ===
- Mammal Insect Marriage (1983)
- The Day the Music Died (1985)
- Ghostride (1989)
- Couch Flambeau (1998)

=== Singles ===
- "We're Not So Smart" / "Mississippi Queen" 7", It's Only A Record Records, 1986
- "Models", [EP], It's Only a Record Records, 1987

=== Compilations ===
- Various Artists - Milwaukee Sampler Vol. 1, (1984) (song: "We'll Go Through The Windshield Together")
- Rock With Your Sock On (1987)
- I Did a Power Slide in a Taco Stand: Anthology 1982–2001 (2004)
