= Pine Valley Cosmonauts =

- Origin: Chicago, Illinois, United States
- Genres: Alt country Country rock
- Label: Bloodshot Records

Pine Valley Cosmonauts (PVC) are a musical ensemble from Chicago, Illinois.

== History ==
The group was initiated by Jon Langford (also of the Waco Brothers and The Mekons) as a covers group, with both repertory and cast of backing members constantly shifting. The name was first used for Langford's 1995 album of Johnny Cash cover songs. In 1998, Langford enlisted the help of a number of prominent alt-country musicians (including Neko Case, Alejandro Escovedo, and Robbie Fulks) for a full-length tribute album to Bob Wills. The PVC served next as the backing band for Kelly Hogan's second album, Beneath the Country Underdog; Hogan had provided vocals on the Wills tribute. Their next album, The Executioner's Last Songs, was released in 2002 and is a collection of songs about death. Following this record's success, the group recorded two more albums of songs about death as benefits for the Illinois Coalition Against the Death Penalty. These albums featured such guests as Steve Earle and Mark Eitzel. The group rarely performs live, though it occasionally does special performances in the Chicago area. In 2007 the group appeared as backing band on Chumbawamba member Danbert Nobacon's solo album The Library Book of the World, as well as playing live with Nobacon.

The PVC appeared at the Old Town School of Folk Music (OTSFM) in Chicago, Illinois, on October 10, 2009, where the band was originally scheduled to back Australian Aboriginal singer Roger Knox, but Knox's US visa was denied. Instead, the band played a number of Knox's songs accompanied by singer Sally Timms. A second set had the band supporting a performance by Rosie Flores. The Knox-Langford tour finally occurred in 2012, including performances at OTSFM and the Hardly Strictly Bluegrass festival in San Francisco, California.

On July 17, 2021, PVC performed at Chicago's Hideout Inn to release their "The Closing Time 2020" album, a song-for-song cover of/tribute to Tom Waits's 1973 first album Closing Time. The album and performances were co-produced and financed by Greg Hall's Virtue Cider brewery, to support the Chicago Independent Venue League (CIVL), a partner and predecessor of the National Independent Venue Association (NIVA). Guests on the album include "Andrew Bird, Sally Timms, Jeff Tweedy, Rosie Flores and Janet Bean".

== Discography ==
Title	Artist credit	Release info	Notes
Misery Loves Company: Songs of Johnny Cash	Jonboy Langford & The Pine Valley Cosmonauts	Released: 1995; Label: Scout Records	Re-released on Bloodshot Records, 1998
Salute the Majesty of Bob Wills	The Pine Valley Cosmonauts	Released: 1998; Label: Bloodshot Records	
Beneath the Country Underdog	Kelly Hogan & The Pine Valley Cosmonauts	Released: 2000; Label: Bloodshot Records	
The Executioner's Last Songs, Vol. 1	The Pine Valley Cosmonauts	Released: 2002; Label: Bloodshot Records	
The Executioner's Last Songs, Vols. 2 & 3	The Pine Valley Cosmonauts	Released: 2003; Label: Bloodshot Records	
Barn Dance Favorites	The Pine Valley Cosmonauts	Released: 2004; Label: Bloodshot Records	
One Day In Chicago	Kevin Coyne with Jon Langford & The Pine Valley Cosmonauts	Released: 2005; Label: Buried Treasure Records	
The Library Book of the World	Danbert Nobacon & The Pine Valley Cosmonauts	Released: 2007; Label: Bloodshot Records	
Girl Of The Century	The Pine Valley Cosmonauts present Rosie Flores	Released: 2009; Label: Bloodshot Records	
Stranger In My Land	Roger Knox & The Pine Valley Cosmonauts	Released: 2013; Label: Bloodshot Records	
The Closing Time 2020	The Pine Valley Cosmonauts	Released: 2021; Label: Virtue Cider	

=== Compilation contributions ===
- "13 Nights" - Down to the Promised Land: 5 Years of Bloodshot Records- as Kelly Hogan & the Pine Valley Cosmonauts (Bloodshot, 2000)
