= Mark Panick =

American musical artist (born 1956)

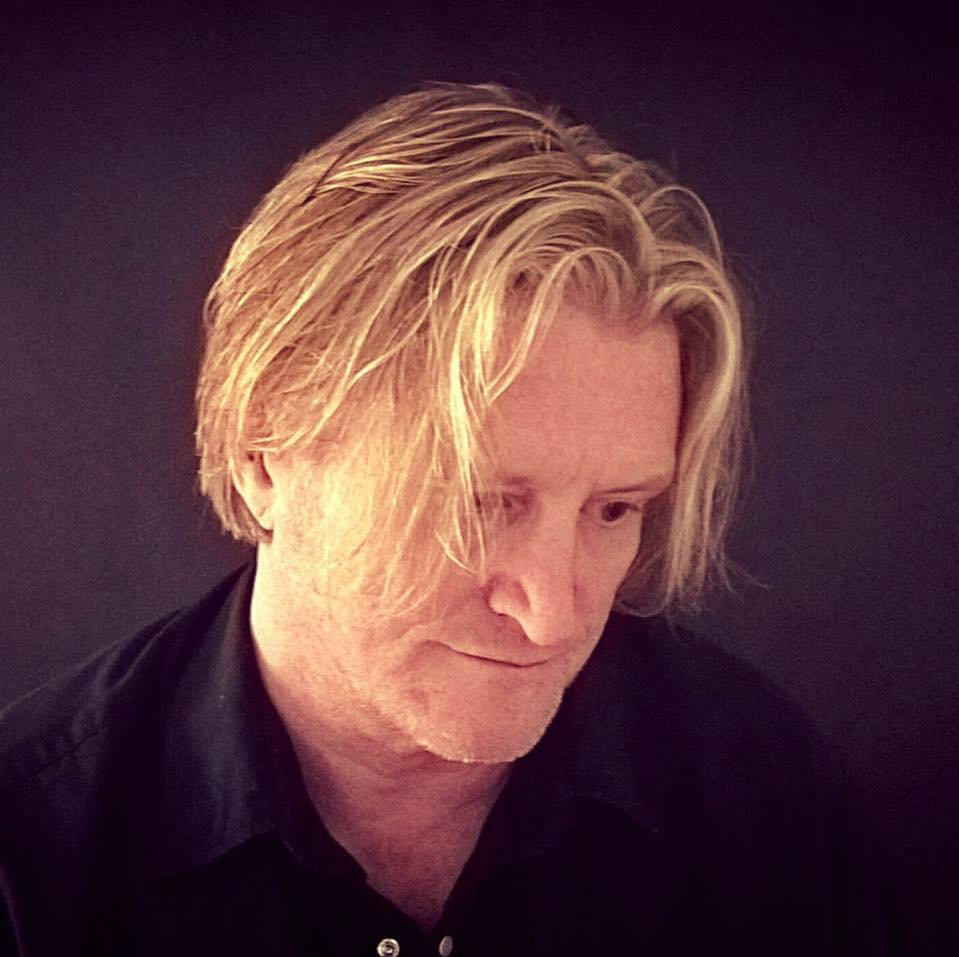

Background information
- Born: Mark Panick; August 28, 1956 (age 69); Chicago, Illinois, United States
- Genres: Rock; alternative rock; industrial
- Occupations: Artist; musician
- Instruments: Guitar; vocals
- Labels: Enigma Records; Trax Records; Fevor Records; Sub Pop

Mark Panick (born August 28, 1956) is an American musician, bandleader and songwriter best known for fronting the underground rock groups Bonemen of Barumba and Razorhouse.

== History ==
In 1981, Panick co-founded Bonemen of Barumba with Tom Jonusaitis. The band went on to release two EPs. The 1981 self titled Bonemen of Barumba EP was described by Steve Albini as "Barbeque [sic] music from hell". In 1983's the group released Driving the Bats Thru Jerusalem. This was described as "ballsy and primitive" by Trouser Press. In 1985's the band released an LP entitled Icons, on the Chicago/Philadelphia imprint Fever, which was distributed by the larger independent label Enigma Records.

The Bonemen of Barumba track Thick Promise appeared on the 1982 cassette compilation Sub Pop 7 and the tracks Barumba Intro and Government Money received airplay on BBC Radio One's The John Peel Show on March 3, 1982. The band also received favorable press in the Los Angeles Reader, The Chicago Sun-Times amongst many others.

While fronting Bonemen of Barumba, Panick was in a short-lived group called Minority of One with Jeff Pezzati, the vocalist for Naked Raygun.

In 1987, Panick launched another musical project, Chac Mool, with house music wunderkind Dean Anderson. The short-lived group, which featured members of the Revolting Cocks, KMFDM and Sister Machine Gun, recorded a single entitled Sex Sells, which was released under the moniker Xipetotec by Trax Records in 2011.

In 1990, Panick formed the band Razorhouse. They released two EPs, 2013's Codex Jun and 2015's Codex Du (co-produced by Howie Beno (Ministry, Black Asteroid) and Danny McGuinness (Ex Senators, Coven of Thieves)) Razorhouse features Panick on vocals and guitar, Danny Shaffer on guitar, David Suycott (Robert Pollard, Stabbing Westward) on drums, Jim DeMonte (The Insiders) on bass, Tommi Zender on guitar and Dan Moulder on keyboards.

In 2019, Lydia Loveless accused Panick of sexual harassment over several years while she worked with Bloodshot Records, and while he was the domestic partner of record label co-owner Nan Warshaw.

== Other bands and affiliations ==
Mark Panick co-wrote the song "King of the Hill" with Nicholas Tremulis and has been affiliated with the bands Judas Horse, Black Friar's Social Club and the Tom Waits tribute act Divine Prophets of Vaudeville.

== Discography ==
=== Bonemen of Barumba ===
- Bonemen of Barumba – EP (1981)
- Driving the Bats Thru Jerusalem – EP (1983)
- Icons – LP (1985)

=== Chac Mool ===
- Xipetotec Sex Sells – EP (2011)

=== Razorhouse ===
- Codex Jun – EP (2013)
- Codex Du - EP (2015)
- Codex Tres Lingua - EP (2018)
- Scolds Bridle - Album (2023)
- Songs About Bunnies & Crocodiles - EP (2024)
