= The Waco Brothers =

American alternative country band

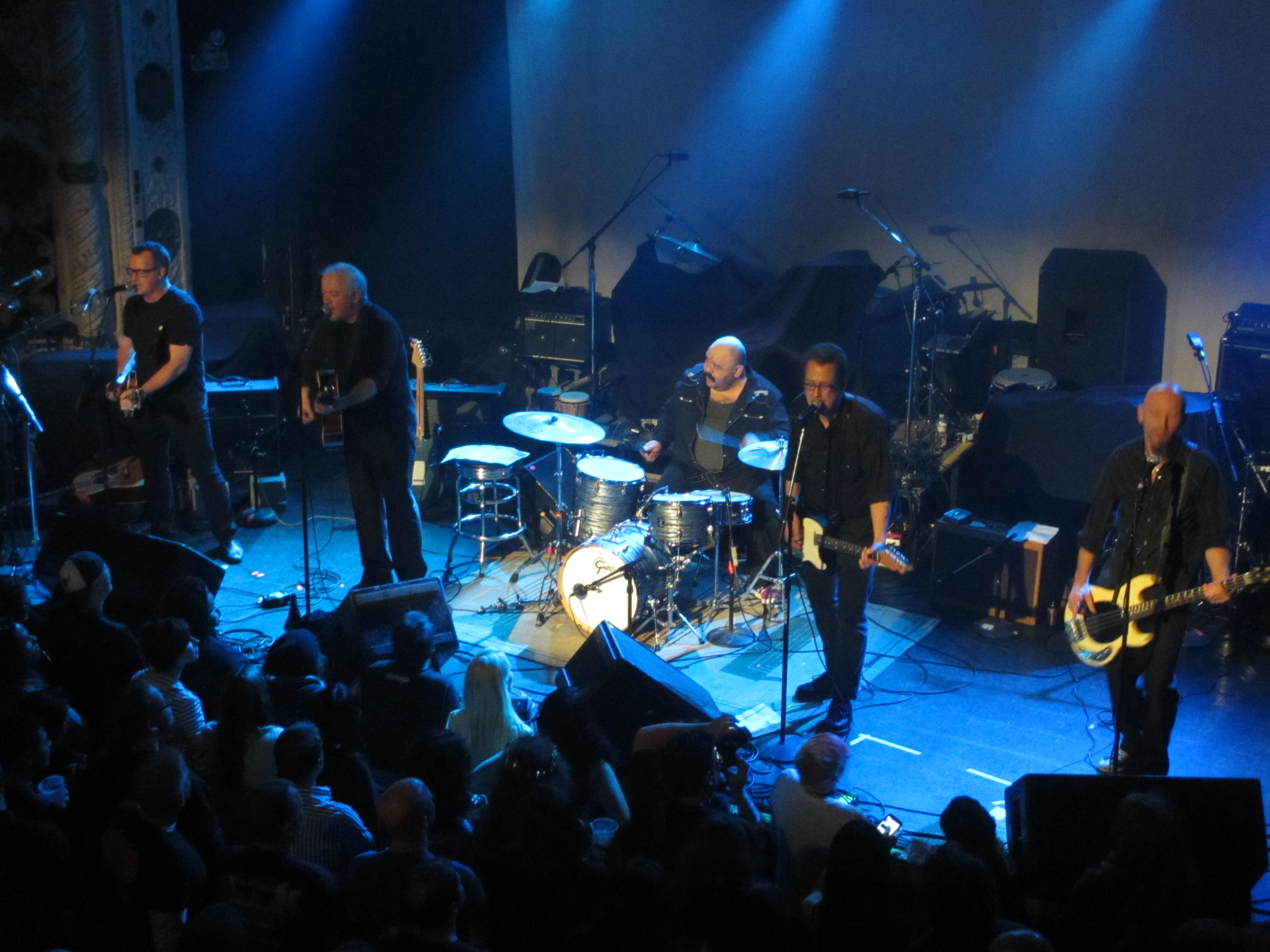
- At the Metro, Chicago 2011

Background information
- Origin: Chicago, Illinois, United States
- Genres: Alt country, cowpunk
- Years active: 1994-present
- Label: Bloodshot Records

The Waco Brothers are an American alternative country, or country-punk rock, band based in Chicago, Illinois, United States.

== History ==
The Waco Brothers was formed by Jon Langford of mekons and Dean Schlabowske of Wreck. The group grew out of Langford's wish to play more country-influenced music as the Mekons concentrated more on a punk sound. They were originally put together simply for local Chicago shows, but the success of their Bloodshot Records albums allowed them to tour the US occasionally. Some of the members also participated in Langford's Pine Valley Cosmonauts project.

The band recorded the first of its studio albums in 1995. Their album, Waco Express: Live & Kickin' at Schuba's Tavern is a concert recording which Ken Tucker, the pop music critic for NPR's Fresh Air and editor-at-large at Entertainment Weekly, described as "country as it should be written and played, with a long memory for roadhouse honky-tonks rather than TV-ready music videos." Author and music critic Sarah Vowell told the Chicagoist, "I’ve never been able to find a live band in New York as consistently thrilling and funny and fun as the Waco Brothers." Until the COVID-19 epidemic, the Waco Brothers made a point of performing every year in Austin, Texas, during the South by Southwest (SXSW) festival. In 2020, their annual December performance at Schubas Tavern in Chicago had to be livestreamed without the usual live audience.

In 2012, the Waco Brothers collaborated with Nashville mainstay Paul Burch to produce Great Chicago Fire. The Chicago Tribune said of the album, "If the Rolling Stones were still making great records, this would be it."

== Members ==
For their first albums, the Waco Brothers included Dean Schlabowske (guitar/vocal), Tracey Dear (mandolin/vocal), Alan Doughty (bass/vocal), Mark Durante (pedal steel guitar), and Mekons drummer Steve Goulding). Joe Camarillo (drums) often filled in for Goulding, who had moved to New York City. By 2015, Camarillo had fully replaced Goulding, and Durante had left. Camarillo died of complications of congenital cardiac disease in January, 2021, after surviving COVID-19. Dan Massey, who had previously substituted on drums whenever Camarillo had been unavailable, became the Waco Brothers permanent new drummer, starting with the band's 2021 concerts. Jean Cook, who had played violin intermittently with the band for years, officially joined the band in 2020. AS of 2024 and since approximately 2017, John Szymanski has been a regular substitute Waco Brother on guitar or bass, plus vocals, whenever one of the regular members was unavailable for a particular performance; Szymanski has been a regular member of several of Jon Langford's other musical projects.

=== Current members ===
Dean Schlabowske, Tracey Dear, Jon Langford, Alan Doughty and Joe Camarillo performing on March 15, 2018

- Tracey Dear (The Peterbilts, Dear Productions) – vocals, mandolin (1993?-present)
- Alan Doughty (Jesus Jones, Skull Orchard, Bad Luck Jonathan) – bass, vocals (1995?-present)
- Jon Langford (Mekons, The Three Johns, Bad Luck Jonathan, Waco Brothers, Four Lost Souls) – vocals, guitar (1993?-present)
- Dean Schlabowske (Deano and the Purvs, Dollar Store, Wreck, Ice Cold Singles, TV White, Ramblin' Deano) – vocals, guitar (1993?-present)
- Dan Massey (Stump the Host, Robbie Fulks etc.) – drums (substituting on stage from 2018?; 2021–present)
- Jean Cook (Beauty Pill, Gena Rowlands Band, Ida, Jenny Toomey, Elizabeth Mitchell, His Name Is Alive, the Art Ensemble of Chicago) - violin (2020–present)

=== Former members ===
- Tom Ray (Bottle Rockets, Devil in a Woodpile, Neko Case) – bass (1993-1995)
- Steve Goulding (Mekons, Pine Valley Cosmonauts, The Associates, Poi Dog Pondering, Graham Parker & the Rumour) – drums (1993?-2012?)
- Mark Durante (Revolting Cocks, KMFDM) – pedal steel guitar (1994–2008)
- Joe Camarillo (born September 3, 1968 – died January 24, 2021; Hushdrops, Number Nine, Gear, Skull Orchard, Kelly Hogan, Bad Luck Jonathan, the Renaldo Domino Experience, NRBQ) – drums (substituting on stage from 1998; 2012?-2021)

== Discography ==
- To the Last Dead Cowboy (Bloodshot Records, 1995)
- Cowboy in Flames (Bloodshot Records, 1997)
- Do You Think About Me? (Bloodshot Records, 1997)
- Wacoworld (Bloodshot Records, 1999)
- Electric Waco Chair (Bloodshot Records, 2000)
- New Deal (Bloodshot Records, 2002)
- Nine Slices of My Midlife Crisis – with Uncle Dave (a.k.a. David Herndon, journalist) (Buried Treasure Records, 2004)
- Freedom and Weep (Bloodshot Records, 2005)
- Waco Express: The Waco Brothers Live and Kickin' at Schuba's [sic] Tavern (Bloodshot Records, 2008) [The tavern is actually named Schubas, for the TWO Schuba brothers.]
- Great Chicago Fire – with Paul Burch (Bloodshot Records, 2012)
- Cabaret Showtime (Bloodshot Records, 2015)
- Going Down in History (Bloodshot Records, 2016)
- RESIST! (Bloodshot Records, 2020)
- The Men That God Forgot (Plenty Tuff, 2023)
- Doomed To Repeat (2023)

=== Compilation contributions ===
- 2000: "Baba O'Riley" (by Pete Townshend) – Down to the Promised Land: 5 Years of Bloodshot Records
- 2000: "See Willy Fly By" – Down to the Promised Land: 5 Years of Bloodshot Records – as Graham Parker w/ the Waco Brothers
- 2002: "The Harder They Come" (by Jimmy Cliff) Making Singles, Drinking Doubles (Bloodshot Records)
- 2005: "I Fought the Law" (by Sonny Curtis)- For A Decade of Sin: 11 Years of Bloodshot Records
