= Oil Tasters =

American rock band

The Oil Tasters were an early 1980s band from Milwaukee, Wisconsin, in the United States. The band comprised bassist and vocalist Richard LaValliere, saxophonist Caleb Alexander, and drummer Guy Hoffman.

The trio, founded on Milwaukee's East Side, released a 2-song 45 record in December 1980. It included "What's In Your Mouth" backed with "Get Out Of The Bathroom," a track which also appeared on Sub Pop founder Bruce Pavitt's compilation cassette release Sub Pop 5 (1981). In August 1981, a three-song EP was released with "That's When The Brick Goes Through The Window," backed with "Earn While You Learn" and "Smoke."

The Oil Tasters left behind a self-titled LP recorded for Thermidor (1982), a Berkeley, California-based independent label. The album was issued on CD in 2005 on the Australian label, Lexicon Devil and featured three bonus tracks ("Gettin' Pretty Pop", "Earn While You Learn" and "Smoke").

== Discography ==
=== Album ===
- "Oil Tasters" (Thermidor Records) 1982

=== Single ===
- "What's In Your Mouth?" / "Get Out Of The Bathroom" (no label listed) 1980

=== Extended Play ===
- "That's When The Brick Goes Through The Window" / "Earn While You Learn" / "Smoke" (Various Records) 1981

=== Compilations ===
- "Sub Pop 5" (Sub Pop Records) 1981, featuring "Get Out Of The Bathroom"
- "The Great Lost Brew Wave Album" (Blackhole Records) 1997, featuring "Gettin' Pretty Pop"
- "History In 3 Chords: Milwaukee Alternative Bands 1973-1982" (Splunge Communications) 2001, featuring "Get Out Of The Bathroom" and "Let Me Sleep On Your Couch"
