= Juniper Tar =

American indie folk-rock band

Juniper Tar is an indie folk-rock band from Milwaukee, Wisconsin, formed in 2005. The band originally started with Jason Mohr, Ryan Schleicher, Aaron Schleicher and Tuc Krueger. In 2008 Chris DeMay joined the group. Their style has been described as "rock and roll with a little roots sweetness."

== History ==
Juniper Tar recorded their first full-length debut album, To the Trees, in a cabin in northern Wisconsin. The album was released in 2008, on the Bus Stop label. They produced a follow-up EP in February 2010: The Howl Street EP. It was self-released and engineered by Shane Hochstetler at Howl Street Recordings in the Bay View neighborhood of Milwaukee.

One month after the release of The Howl Street EP, Juniper Tar traveled to Austin, Texas to play SXSW, one of the largest music festivals in the United States.

== Projects ==
=== 2010 ===
- High Frequency Media has partnered with Juniper Tar to produce a tour film, documenting Juniper Tar's east coast tour in June.
- As of May 2010, Juniper Tar was recording album number three at Howl Street Recordings, with an expected release date of August 2010.

== Members ==
- Jason Mohr (Vocals, Guitar)
- Aaron Schleicher (Guitar, Vocals)
- Tuc Krueger (Drums, Percussion)
- Ryan Schleicher (Bass, Vocals)
- Chris DeMay (Piano/Organ, Guitar)

== Discography ==
- To the Trees (2008)
- The Howl Street EP (2010)
