= WMSE =

Coordinates: 43.046°N 87.908°W

Milwaukee, Wisconsin; United States
- Broadcast area: Milwaukee, Wisconsin
- Frequency: 91.7 MHz
- Branding: WMSE 91.7FM

Programming
- Format: Alternative, blues, jazz, new age, world

Ownership
- Owner: Milwaukee School of Engineering

History
- First air date: March 17, 1981
- Call sign meaning: Milwaukee School of Engineering

Technical information
- Licensing authority: FCC
- Facility ID: 42675
- Class: A
- ERP: 3,200 watts
- HAAT: 40 meters (130 ft)

Links
- Public license information: Public file; LMS
- Webcast: Listen live
- Website: www.wmse.org

WMSE (91.7 FM) is a non-commercial radio station in Milwaukee, Wisconsin, playing a wide-ranging eclectic music format run by volunteer DJs. The station is part of the Milwaukee School of Engineering (MSOE).

== History ==
=== Early history of MSOE stations ===
On July 22, 1922, a broadcasting license was issued jointly to the School of Engineering of Milwaukee and the daily evening newspaper, The Wisconsin News, which was owned by the Hearst Corporation. The call letters assigned (sequentially, they had no meaning) were WIAO. Since December 1, 1921, radio stations had been assigned two wavelengths: 360 meters (833 kHz) for "broadcasting news, concerts and such matter", and 485 meters (619 kHz) for "broadcasting crop reports and weather forecasts". As such, WIAO was licensed to broadcast on a wavelength of 360 meters (833.3 kHz). Although its license called for "unlimited" time at a power of 500 watts, the fact that the three other Milwaukee stations: WAAK (Gimbel Brothers department store), WCAY (Kesselman O'Driscol Music Co.) and WHAD (Marquette University), were also licensed for the 360 meter band, meant that WIAO had to share time with them.

At 10:15 a.m. on October 23 of that year, WIAO went on the air from the school's Marshall Street building with 100 watts of power, using a student-built transmitter. That power level was formalized on January 9, 1923, when a new license was issued.

On July 23, 1923, another new license was issued — this time solely to the School of Engineering — specifying a power level of 200 watts. The power level was reduced to 100 watts on October 9.

In January 1924, The Wisconsin News, began programming the station on a part-time basis. On May 31, 1924, the station was authorized to shift its frequency to 246 meters (1220 kHz). The station did so at 5:30 p.m. on Monday, June 9. On August 18 of that year, WIAO changed its call letters to WSOE. On December 31, the school announced that it had purchased all of the equipment of WCBD in Zion, Illinois (one of the first religious stations, which also preached "flat earth" information). The purchase included a new, more powerful (500 watt) transmitter and twin towers, which were mounted atop the school's Oneida (now Wells) Street building. The new WSOE was dedicated on July 8, 1925. At that time, The Wisconsin News took over programming the station full-time, while the School of Engineering took care of technical operations. Formal approval of the power increase was issued on July 15.

The authorized power level was increased to 1,000 watts on April 21, 1927.

At 3:00 a.m. on June 15, 1927, the first of two major reassignments of radio frequencies made by the new Federal Radio Commission (FRC) took effect. The reassignment affected almost 600 of the nation's 694 radio stations. WSOE was shifted to a wavelength of 270 meters (1110 kHz).

The Journal Co. had programmed Marquette University's station, WHAD, since January 1925. It could not come to a satisfactory agreement with them on where to take the station, and at the suggestion of a Federal Radio Commissioner, decided to purchase another. On April 20, 1927, The Journal Co. purchased WKAF.

On June 1, 1927, WSOE was shifted to a frequency of 1110 kHz and its power reduced to 500 watts. WHAD was assigned to a wavelength of 293 meters (1020 kHz), and ordered to share time with WKAF until the Journal Co. took over the latter station, at which time WHAD would be moved to another frequency. That happened on July 25, 1927, and the call letters were changed to WTMJ.

As a result, WHAD was shifted to 270 meters (1110 kHz) on September 15, and ordered to share time with WSOE. On October 15, WSOE's power was cut to 250 watts.

To compete with WTMJ, The Wisconsin News entered into a lease arrangement with the School of Engineering on November 15, 1927. The lease was for a minimum of three years. The agreement specified that the newspaper was to "operate the station and furnish all financial support while its ownership and technical supervision was to remain in the hands of the school." Subsequent license applications filed on January 11 & 12 were filed in the name of the School of Engineering and The Wisconsin News, respectively.

To reflect the new arrangement, The Wisconsin News changed the call letters of WSOE to WISN on January 23, 1928.

With the issuance of its General Order 40 on August 30, 1928, the FRC assigned WISN a new wavelength of 267 meters (1120 kHz) at 250 watts of power. The new assignment took effect on November 11. It was also ordered to share time with WHAD, with WISN receiving six-sevenths of the available time, and WHAD one-seventh. The studios, transmitter and towers were still located at the School of Engineering. WHAD had objected to the time-share arrangement with WISN, but its request to shift to 900 kHz was denied by the FRC on October 22.

WISN applied for permission to increase its power to 1000 watts on July 29, 1930, and it was granted by the FRC on September 12. The station was sold to The Wisconsin News in November of that year. (Note: This is based upon the fact that the initial lease was for three years, as well as that according to Frost (p. 213) in its license application of December 30, 1930, WISN stated that the newspaper was the owner.)

The station continued to be located at the School of Engineering until 1932. That year, the School of Engineering reorganized itself as a non-profit corporation, and changed its name to the Milwaukee School of Engineering (MSOE). It moved from the Oneida Street building after purchasing the German-English Academy on North Broadway Street. Hearst also owned the morning newspaper, The Milwaukee Sentinel, and the WISN station offices and studios were relocated to its building on Michigan Avenue. The transmitter and tower were relocated to the top of the Milwaukee Electric Railway & Light Co.'s Public Service Building, and the newspaper took over operational responsibility for WISN.

=== WSOE, WMSE ===
In 1968, MSOE students signed on another station using the call letters WSOE (which were not officially assigned). This time, it was an unlicensed carrier current AM station. Transmitters were installed in each of the two dormitories, and carried via a low power wireless microphone type transmitter operating on 91.7 MHz from the studio two blocks away. Although intended as a "studio-transmitter link", the FM signal could be picked up on campus by anyone with an FM radio. In July 1978, MSOE students applied for an FM construction permit for an educational station on 91.7 MHz—although the application was in the name of the school's board of regents. The school received a construction permit on December 12, 1979.

The call letters "WSOE" had been given to the newly formed college radio station at Elon University in 1977. MSOE's very own 1000-watt FM station, WMSE, applied for its license and officially began programming on March 17, 1981. (Note: The station had been broadcasting "engineering test" prior to the first on-air date. March 17 was chosen as St. Patrick is the Patron Saint of Engineers at MSOE, and his feast day marks a week-long celebration there.) Programming consisted of an eclectic mix of freeform programming from volunteer DJs. Most DJs have three-hour time slots, and program as they wish, mostly within their chosen formats.

In 1988-89 there was a brief period of controversy for the station as it banned the musical genre heavy metal, arguably WMSE's most well-publicized late night programming. A small backlash was aided by local musician advocates, as well as record producer Eric Greif, which included an organized advertising boycott which was covered by the Wisconsin media.

In 1994, the station upgraded its equipment and increased its power to 3200 watts. In the late 1990s the station expanded its potential audience through its website, wmse.org, which supports live streaming audio as well as downloadable archives. In 1999, the university cut the station's funding, and it is now entirely listener and sponsor supported, with most money being raised by twice-yearly on-air fund drives.

Since 2003, WMSE has released a series of CD compilations featuring performances recorded live in the station's studio.

== Fund raising activities ==
Up until 1997, fund raising events were limited to underwriting from local businesses. In exchange for financial support, businesses received mention on the air at the beginning and end of certain programming hours. While on-air underwriting remains, in 1997 WMSE held its first on-air pledge drive and also introduced the Club Card for purchase which offered discounts at area business.

After funding from the college was cut, WMSE became even more dependent on listener support. The station allots two weeks out of the year, one in the fall and one in the spring in which listeners can pledge. These pledge drive typically include numerous on-air live performances from both local and national artists. Though there are designated times for donation, WMSE accepts any donations at any time in the year.

They also hold an annual Rockabilly Chili Contest and a Food Slam Competition that many local businesses participate in.

For their 25th anniversary on March 17, 2006, they made available several limited edition prints of works donated by local artists for individuals who donated above a certain level.

== Projects ==
In 2004, WMSE launched the Milwaukee Sound Environment (M.S.E.) Project, a music resource for Milwaukee area artists and listeners. Established with a grant from the Milwaukee Arts Board and the Wisconsin Arts Board, The M.S.E. Project web site includes music news, Mp3's from local artists, and FAQs for bands interested in getting their music heard on the station. The project also established a dedicated time-slot for live in-studio performances.

== Schedule, current content ==
The broadcast day is divided into eight three-hour programs for a total of 56 programs during a week. Like much of college radio, DJs are not required to play song lists and a great deal of diversity exists between the 56 various shows. With the exception of the Blues Drive in afternoon drive, timeslots are not content specific.
