= Jon Langford =

Welsh musician and artist (born 1957)

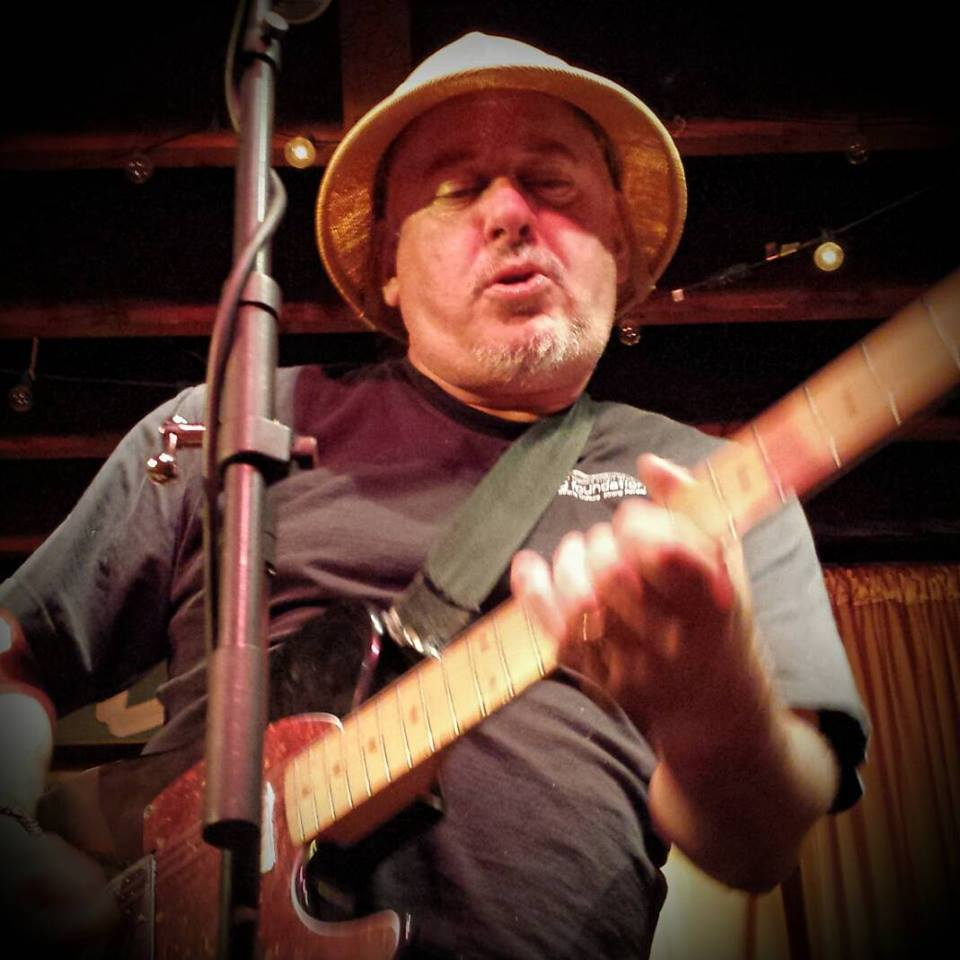
- Langford performing in 2015

Background information
- Also known as: The Welsh Adonis, Jonboy Langford, Chuck Death, John Fanglord
- Born: 11 October 1957 (age 69); Newport, Wales
- Origin: Leeds, West Yorkshire, England
- Genres: Alternative country; rock and roll; punk rock
- Occupations: Musician, painter, graphic designer
- Instruments: Guitar, drums
- Years active: 1977–present
- Label: Bloodshot Records
- Member of: The Mekons; Pine Valley Cosmonauts; The Waco Brothers
- Formerly of: Wee Hairy Beasties; The Three Johns; KatJonBand
- Website: jonlangford.de

Jonathan Denis Langford (born 11 October 1957) is a Welsh musician and artist based in Chicago, Illinois, United States.

Langford is a founder member of the punk band The Mekons, the post-punk group The Three Johns, and the alternative country ensembles The Waco Brothers and Pine Valley Cosmonauts.

== Early life ==
Langford was born in Newport, Wales, the youngest son of Kit Langford and Denis Langford, a registered chartered accountant for Lloyd's Brewery and Deloitte & Touche. Langford's older brother is science-fiction author and critic David Langford, who lives in Reading, Berkshire.

When he was young, Langford would visit his grandparents in Croesyceiliog, whose family friend ran two pubs, the Cambrian Arms and The Six in Hand. He attended Gaer Infants School and Gaer Junior School, then Brynglas Primary School, the Newport High School middle school on Queen's Hill. In 1972–1973, after playing rugby and football, at the age of 15 Langford decided he liked playing music better. He played a lot of David Bowie and was listening to a lot of Man.

Langford attended art school at University of Leeds as a painter. He left school temporarily when The Mekons were founded, but later went back to college and finished his degree.

== Music ==
Since the mid-1980s, Langford has been one of the leaders in incorporating folk and country music into punk rock. He has released a number of solo recordings as well as recordings with other bands outside of The Mekons, most notably the Waco Brothers, which he co-founded after moving to Chicago in the early 1990s.

In a 2010 interview, Langford said his earliest influences were Tom Jones, Slade, T. Rex, The Kinks, Johnny Cash, Man and Black Sabbath.

=== The Mekons ===
Langford was originally the drummer for the punk band "The Mekons" when it formed at the University of Leeds in 1977, but he later took up the guitar as other band members left. The Mekons were signed to Virgin Records but according to Langford they "got fired." They played their first United States appearance on New Year's Eve in 1980, gave up live performances for a while, and released 1982's The Mekons Story. They began performing again in public in 1984, playing their first shows as benefits for the British miners' union. After being signed by major American label A&M Records in the late 1980s, label shuffling resulted in the band trying to leave the label. In response, they recorded Curse of the Mekons, which the label refused to release, becoming available in the U.S. only as an import. A documentary called The Revenge of the Mekons was released in 2014 by director Joe Angio. The Mekons continue to record and perform live, as of 2022 and 2026.

=== The Three Johns ===
With John Hyatt and Phillip Brennan, Langford released several albums of drum-machine-fueled punk between 1982 and 1987. A retrospective box set was released in August 2015. Also, in 1988 Tom Greenhalgh, Langford's colleague in the Mekons, collaborated with members of the Three Johns as the Jelly Bishops to release the five-song EP "Kings Of Barstool Mountain".

=== Dim Subooteyo ===
As "Dim Subooteyo", Brendan Croker and Langford released the album Lakeside (1990, SNAT Records).

=== The Killer Shrews ===
The "Killer Shrews" were a group composed of Langford (lead vocals), Gary Lucas, and Tony Maimone. They released one self-titled album on Enemy Records in 1993.

=== The Waco Brothers ===
The "Waco Brothers" make country-punk music, and are a Chicago-based amalgam of players from the Pine Valley Cosmonauts family and others, who have been recording since 1995, as of 2021. For their first albums, they included Dean Schlabowske (guitar/vocal), Tracey Dear (mandolin/vocal), Alan Doughty (bass/vocal), Mark Durante (pedal steel guitar), and Mekons drummer Steve Goulding). By 2015, Goulding, now based in New York City, had been replaced by Joe Camarillo (drums), and Durante had left. Camarillo died in January 2021, and was replaced by Dan Massey. Jean Cook (violin, vocal) joined in 2020.

=== Pine Valley Cosmonauts ===
Langford initiated another project, the "Pine Valley Cosmonauts", which performs the music of other country music groups. Several alternative country musicians have guested alongside a revolving assortment of Chicago musicians who have backed both Langford and other musicians such as Kelly Hogan.

=== Wee Hairy Beasties ===
The "Wee Hairy Beasties" were a children's music group based in Chicago, composed of Jon Langford, Sally Timms, Kelly Hogan, and Devil in a Woodpile. They played their first gig together at the Brookfield Zoo near Chicago, and released two albums in 2006 and 2008.

=== Men of Gwent ===
The "Men of Gwent" are mainly Newport-based musicians, including members of Give Me Memphis and The Darling Buds. Previously known as LL, the group have written and recorded intermittently for over 20 years, and have been playing live since 2007. As LL, their only release was a demo track ("Rechem") on the 1999 compilation Fear of a Red Planet. Their debut album The Legend of LL was released on Country Mile Records in 2015 and included reworkings of several songs from the same LL demos, as well as a new version of "Pill Sailor", first released on Skull Orchard in 1998. Their second album President of Wales was released in November 2019, also on Country Mile.

=== Solo, Skull Orchard, etc. ===
Langford's first official solo album, Skull Orchard, a look back at his hometown of Newport, Wales, was released in 1998. He followed it with All the Fame of Lofty Deeds, in 2004, and Gold Brick in 2006.

Ever since releasing the original 2008 album, Langford continued to intermittently use the "Skull Orchard" band name, usually when recording or performing live with accompanying electric instruments. Skull Orchard has almost always included bassist Alan Doughty, also of the Waco Brothers. In 2010 and 2011 for example, frequent members also included Joe Camarillo (of the Waco Brothers), Jim Elkington, Jean Cook, and Tawny Newsome. Recordings credited to Jon Langford and the Skull Orchard include his 2010 Old Devils album, his 2014 Here Be Monsters album, and, starting in 2020, some of the songs in his Jon Langford's Lucky Seven Series of singles.

In the late 2000s Langford met the "Burlington [Ontario, Canada] Welsh Male Chorus", who are based near Toronto. He invited them first to accompany him at a CeltFest in Chicago in 2007, and then to re-record the whole of the Skull Orchard. The album Skull Orchard Revisited (credited to Jon Langford and the Burlington Welsh Male Chorus) was released on 3 June 2011 by Bloodshot Records. Langford continued to intermittently perform live with the chorus.

Circa 2003, Langford started the band "Ship & Pilot", to perform his songs, especially in and near New York City. It continued to perform into 2006, and very occasionally since, including in 2022. Ship & Pilot also included Tony Maimone, Jean Cook, usually Sally Timms, and on drums variously Steve Goulding or Dan Massey.

At the 2014 Hideout Block Party in Chicago, Langford debuted the band "Bad Luck Jonathan" (a name likely inspired by that of then-president of Nigeria, Goodluck Jonathan). The band, described as "socialist voodoo space boogie", featured Alan Doughty and Joe Camarillo from the Waco Brothers, Phil Wandscher from Whiskeytown, and Martin Billheimer from Chicago's former Devil Bell Hippies (and the Pritzker Military Museum and Library). According to Langford, "Bad Luck Jonathan is very loud and unashamedly 1971."

"Four Lost Souls" was a collaboration between Langford, John Szymanski, Tawny Newsome and Bethany Thomas. Their eponymous debut album was produced by Norbert Putnam and released in 2017, followed by live performances.

"Jon Langford & The Bright Shiners", with Tamineh Gueramy (fiddle), Alice Spencer (Mellotron), and John Szymanski (guitar) - and all on vocals - was formed circa 2022. By 2024 they were touring occasionally around the US and in the UK. They released an album in 2024.

Aside from the above-mentioned bands, Langford has performed with many different musicians over the years, but his most constant live collaborator has been singer and fellow Mekon Sally Timms, ever since they both moved to Chicago. As of 2024, they continue to collaborate on various recording and performance projects.

Langford, with and without Timms, has often performed his own and others' songs accompanied by a lead guitar player. Circa 2000, session guitarist John Rice, formerly of Chicago country music band the Sundowners, often joined Langford live around Chicago. From 2015 into 2024, John Szymanski has regularly been Langford's lead guitarist. For louder performances in and near Chicago in the 21st century, Langford has often added bassist Alan Doughty and drummer Dan Massey, calling this aggregation first "Jon Langford & 3 Blokes" (2018-2021) and then "Jon Langford and His Fancy Men" (2021+). Langford has sometimes graced various other ad hoc groups with particular names, such as "Jon Langford and the Sturdy Nelsons" (2018); "Jon Langford & the Far Forlorn" (circa 2015 through at least 2023, in Austin, Texas), "Jon Langford and the Six Proud Walkers" (2000-2001), "Lost in America Tour Band" (2003), "The One Day Band" (2002), and "Jon Langford’s Hillbilly Lovechild" (2019, 1994).

Langford has brought a band to nearly every annual Hardly Strictly Bluegrass festival, in San Francisco, in the 21st century.

== Visual art ==
Langford is also a painter and graphic designer. Langford has painted portraits of figures from country music, including Hank Williams, Johnny Cash, Elvis Presley, and "The Cuckoo", often based on well known photographs. Many of his paintings and prints are available from the Yard Dog Art Gallery in Austin, TX, and LeMieux Galleries in New Orleans, LA, and Hatch Show Print Gallery in Nashville, TN as of 2021. Nashville Radio, a collection of his artwork and writings, was published in 2006.

Langford has designed and painted the covers for many music recordings. These include, but are not limited to, most of the recordings on which he has been the musical leader, and many recordings of his other bands. Other examples include the cover art of The Sandinista! Project – A Tribute to The Clash and "Commercial Suicide Man" (2018), a collaborative single by the Nightingales and Vic Godard.

In 2015, Langford was commissioned by the Country Music Hall of Fame and Museum to paint a series of portraits for its "Dylan, Cash, and the Nashville Cats: A New Music City" exhibition, which opened on 27 March 2015. Of that exhibit, per Langford, "I said to my wife, 'They’ve got ‘The Death of Country Music’ on the wall at the Country Music Hall of Fame', and she just went, 'Well, I guess you won, then'.” That commission lead to a collaboration between Langford and Hatch Show Print Master Printer Jim Sherraden. Their artwork was then adapted for the album covers of the 2015 double-LP compilation Dylan, Cash, and the Nashville Cats: A New Music City and of the 2016 triple-LP Trio: Farther Along by Dolly Parton, Linda Ronstadt, and Emmylou Harris.

Langford has designed the graphics for T-shirts, tote bags, and other items to support various organisations, including: Chicago's Giveashirt, which benefits StreetWise magazine (which is sold by people who are homeless or at risk of being homeless); Chicago's Hideout Inn during the COVID-19 pandemic; Chicago's Old Town School of Folk Music; and San Francisco's Hardly Strictly Bluegrass festival. Langford's paintings appear on bottles and other items for the Dogfish Head Brewery, and Few Spirits. Since 2015, Langford has designed covers for a series of novels by author Jay Spencer Green, including Breakfast at Cannibal Joe's and Ivy Feckett is Looking for Love.

For over 10 years, Langford illustrated the pop-music parody comic strip Great Pop Things under the pseudonym Chuck Death with a friend from his hometown, Newport, Wales, Colin B. Morton, who wrote the text. The cartoon strip was published in music and alternative weekly newspapers in London, Los Angeles, and Chicago, and was a pen-and-ink history of rock-and-roll. An anthology of the best strips was published in a book of the same name.

== Radio ==
- For several years starting in 2005, Langford co-hosted, with Nicholas Tremulis, and occasionally Kelly Hogan, "The Eclectic Company", a weekly radio program, which was broadcast on WXRT 93.1 FM in Chicago.
- Langford has contributed to episodes of the syndicatedThis American Life program.

== Theatre ==
- In 2005, Langford's multimedia music/spoken-word/video performance, The Executioner's Last Songs, premiered at Alverno College, and has been performed in several other cities.
- In January and February 2009, Chicago's Walkabout Theater Company and Collaboraction premiered a stage adaptation of Langford's Goldbrick that featured a live band, two actors and video projections.
- In November and December 2009, The House Theatre of Chicago staged a production of All the Fame of Lofty Deeds, written by rock journalist Mark Guarino and based on Langford's art and 2004 solo album of the same name.
- In November 2018, scored Mark Guarino's play Take Me, produced at Straw Dog Theater Company. Chris Jones, theatre critic for The Chicago Tribune stated "if you're a fan of Langford’s work, you'll find plenty here to merit a trip to Strawdog: At times, I was tempted to close my eyes, getting lost in the Bowie-esque longing you can find in these lush and potent melodies, true and vital feeling hidden in pastiche."

== Collaborations ==
- Langford has appeared on recordings with Dutch punk band the Ex, The Old 97s, Chip Taylor, Alejandro Escovedo, and has recorded joint albums with Richard Buckner, Kevin Coyne, Kat Ex (Katherina Bornefeld, in KatJonBand), Rosie Flores, Roger Knox, Danbert Nobacon, The Sadies, Walter Salas-Humara, and Sally Timms.
- Langford also contributed to and worked with Doorika, a defunct performance arts collective based in Chicago and New York City.
- Langford was Castee #00039 in Cynthia Plaster Caster's plaster castings. The piece was named Long Dong Jon Langford.

== Politics and service ==
Langford considers himself "working class socialist."

In 1988, Langford co-produced (with Mark Riley) a Johnny Cash tribute album, 'Til Things are Brighter..., to raise funds for the Terrence Higgins Trust. The album was endorsed and admired by Cash himself who is featured alongside Langford and Riley on its cover. He and his fellow musicians have done many other musical fundraisers to support various causes, including striking British coal miners and Doctors Without Borders (The Mekons); and the Kentuckians for the Commonwealth (Freakons).

Langford produced The Executioner's Last Songs, Vols. 1, 2, & 3 record compilations of 2002 and 2003, by various singers backed by the Pine Valley Cosmonauts, to benefit charitable organisations working to end the death penalty (Artists Against the Death Penalty, the Illinois Death Penalty Moratorium Project, and the National Coalition To Abolish the Death Penalty). In 2006, Langford was commissioned to develop a performance based on the compilations for the Museum of Contemporary Art in Chicago; the show was also performed at the Walker Art Center in Minneapolis.

As mentioned above, Langford has designed and contributed graphics to a variety of organisations. Langford was an honorary board member of the Chicago-based nonprofit organisation Rock for Kids.

== Personal life ==
Langford is married to architect and jewellery designer, Helen Tsatsos. They were introduced in 1986 at a party after a Three Johns gig in her home town of Chicago. Langford and Tsatsos have lived in Chicago ever since their marriage in 1992. They have two children.

== Solo discography ==
=== Albums ===
- 1998: Skull Orchard (Bloodshot Records)
- 2003: Mayors of the Moon (Bloodshot Records) – as Jon Langford and his Sadies
- 2004: All the Fame of Lofty Deeds (Bloodshot Records)
- 2006: Gold Brick (Bloodshot Records)
- 2009: All the Fame of Lofty Deeds – The Soundtrack (Bloodshot Records)
- 2010: Live at the Hideout: Jon Langford and Walter Salas-Humara (Bloodshot Records) – digital only
- 2010: Old Devils (Bloodshot Records) - as Jon Langford and Skull Orchard
- 2011: Skull Orchard Revisited – debut album Skull Orchard re-recorded with the Burlington Welsh Male Choir; book + CD (Verse Chorus Press)
- 2014: Here Be Monsters (Bloodshot Records) - as Jon Langford and Skull Orchard
- 2014: Choice Cuts: Best of Jon Langford (Bloodshot Records)
- 2014: Bad Luck Jonathan (Blue Arrow Records) – as Bad Luck Jonathan
- 2017: Four Lost Souls (Bloodshot Records)
- 2023: Gubbins (self-released, via bandcamp)
- 2024: Where It Really Starts (Tiny Global Productions) - as Jon Langford & the Bright Shiners

=== EPs ===
- 1998: Gravestone EP (Bloodshot Records)
- 2000: Songs of False Hope & High Values (Bloodshot Records) – Sally Timms & Jon Langford

=== singles ===
- 2002: "Rocket Man" (by Elton John & Bernie Taupin) digital only - as "The One Day Band"
- 2012: Drone Operator (Bloodshot Records) – as Jon Langford and Skull Orchard
- 2018: Worm In Your Ear / Stone Tumbling Stream (Tiny Global Productions, via bandcamp) - as Martin Bramah/Jon Langford
- 2020: Jon Langford's Lucky Seven Series, part 1 (Tiny Global Productions, via bandcamp) - package of 6 songs on 3 vinyl singles; also digital
- 2021: Jon Langford's Lucky Seven Series, part 2 (Tiny Global Productions, via bandcamp) - package of 6 songs on 3 vinyl singles; also digital
- 2023: Jon Langford's Lucky Seven Series, part 3 (Tiny Global Productions, via bandcamp) - package of 6 songs on 3 vinyl singles; also digital

=== Compilation contributions (partial list) ===
- 1994: "Over the Cliff" – For a Life of Sin: A Compilation of Insurgent Chicago Country – as Jon Langford’s Hillbilly Lovechild (w/ Tony Maimone, Brian Doherty, & Tracy Dear; Bloodshot Records)
- 2000: "Brixton" – Down to the Promised Land: 5 Years of Bloodshot Records – Chip Taylor w/ Jon Langford (Bloodshot Records)
- 2002: "Nashville Radio" – Making Singles, Drinking Doubles (Bloodshot Records)
- 2006" "Take This Hammer" – Old Town School of Folk Music Songbook Volume One (Old Town School Recordings, Bloodshot Records)
- 2007: "Junco Partner" and "Version Pardner" – The Sandinista! Project – A Tribute to The Clash – Jon Langford and Sally Timms with Ship & Pilot (00:02:59 Records/MRI Associated Labels)
- 2019: "I Am a Big Town" – Too Late to Pray: Defiant Chicago Roots – as Jon Langford’s Hillbilly Lovechild (w/ Tony Maimone, Steve Albini, & John Szymanski; Bloodshot Records)

== Works or publications ==
- Morton, Colin B., Chuck Death, and Greil Marcus. Great Pop Things. Harmondsworth, Middlesex: Penguin, 1992. ISBN 978-0-140-17156-3 OCLC 441310470
- Morton, Colin B., and Chuck Death. The Real History of Rock and Roll from Elvis to Oasis. Portland, OR: Verse Chorus Press, 1998. ISBN 978-1-891-24108-6 OCLC 41108753
- Langford, Jon. Nashville Radio: Art, Words and Music. Portland, OR: Verse Chorus Press, 2006. ISBN 978-1-891-24119-2 OCLC 65470084
- Langford, Jon, and David Langford. Skull Orchard Revisited: Art, Words & Music. Portland, OR: Verse Chorus Press, 2011. ISBN 978-1-891-24130-7 OCLC 670481762
