= Bloodshot Records =

American independent record label

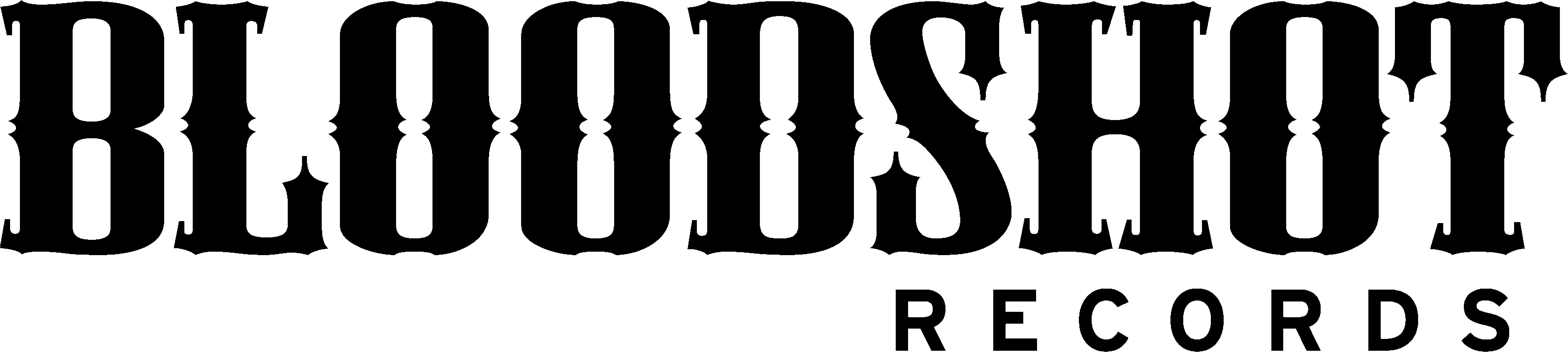
- Founded: 1993; 33 years ago
- Founder: Nan Warshaw; Rob Miller; Eric Babcock (former partner from 1993–1997)
- Distributor: ADA
- Genre: Alternative country; Americana
- Country of origin: United States
- Location: Chicago, Illinois
- Official website: BloodshotRecords.com

Bloodshot Records is an independent record label based in Chicago, Illinois, which specializes in alternative country music.

== History ==
Bloodshot Records was founded in 1994 by Nan Warshaw, Rob Miller, and Eric Babcock, who knew each other from jobs in the music industry and from being active in what was then a burgeoning underground country-roots music scene.

Warshaw had been promoting, booking, and managing bands for years and also worked as a publicist for the band Killbilly, which released a record on Flying Fish Records, where Babcock worked. She was well known around Chicago as a punk raconteur. Her reputation was confirmed when Kurt Cobain's diaries were posthumously published in 2002 included this mention: "Call Nan Warshaw" appears on his to-do list.

Miller moved to Chicago in 1991 from Ann Arbor, Michigan where he helped to produce shows for a local promoter and DJed on a local radio station. He met Warshaw in 1993 at the Crash Palace, a local punk bar where Warshaw was a DJ spinning country records on Wednesday nights (which shortly after was renamed to Delilah's, and in 2025 still exists under that name).

While having drinks at a bar, Warshaw, Miller, and Babcock made a wish-list on a cocktail napkin of unheralded Chicago bands and musicians they loved — who all had a thread of old school country running through their music. That cocktail napkin list became 17 songs from 16 bands recorded for a self-funded first release in 1994 under the Bloodshot Records label titled For A Life of Sin: A Compilation of Insurgent Chicago Country. The album included artists such as The Bottle Rockets, Freakwater, The Handsome Family, and Robbie Fulks, as well as The Sundowners, a country music trio that started in the 1950s. The record was self-distributed and sold on consignment in stores and, selling out its initial pressing of 1,000 copies. The success of the record left funds to do another compilation.

Bloodshot Records was initially run out of Warshaw's apartment in the Lakeview neighborhood of Chicago and later the business moved into her basement. In 1997 Kelly Hogan, singer and Bloodshot Records artist, was the first paid employee, working as the label's publicist. In 1999, the label moved to its current location on West Irving Park Road. Both Warshaw and Miller worked supplemental jobs to keep afloat. Miller was a carpenter painting houses and Warshaw was doing publicity work.

=== Growth of the record label ===
Following the compilation format of the initial album release, Bloodshot organized record release shows in multiple cities with four or five bands on each night's line-up. The shows drew press coverage for the new label and the bands/artists, which for some was their first recording and opportunity to play multiple-band shows.

A year later, in 1995, the label released their second compilation album Hell Bent: Insurgent Country Volume 2. The album included bands from all over the country, and Bloodshot continued to put on events showcasing the bands involved with the making of the record. Although well received by critics, Bloodshot had very tight financial constraints, and worked under the model of not starting a new project until the prior project had paid for itself. Also challenging was establishing Bloodshot's brand, a mixture of country, punk, and folk that had no precedent. The name of the music genre was a point of contention, with some grouping the unique, hard-to-classify singer-songwriter music under the alternative country and some grouping it under the Americana label.

In 1997, co-founder Babcock left Bloodshot, eventually relocating to Nashville, where he founded Catamount Records. After Babcock left, ownership of Bloodshot was split fifty/fifty between the two other founding partners, Warshaw and Miller.

By 1999, its fifth year in business, Bloodshot had released 60 records. That year, the label released another compilation, Down to the Promised Land, with 40 unreleased track on two CD that included every artist and band on the label.

In 2000, Bloodshot released Ryan Adams' record Heartbreaker, and the popularity of the record created a more stable financial base for the label. allowed Warshaw and Miller to dedicate themselves full-time to running the label, move to a bigger office space in the northwest side of Chicago, and begin to hire employees. The full-time Bloodshot staff eventually grew to six. Singer Kelly Hogan was the first paid employee, working as the label's publicist. The Chicago twang, country, and punk scene, often described as a sort of an anti-Nashville, continued to expand, often led by various projects involving The Mekons' Jon Langford.

In 2014, Bloodshot released their 20th-anniversary album, While No One Was Looking: Toasting 20 Years of Bloodshot Records. The album is a two-CD set with 38 artists that include Andrew Bird, Blitzen Trapper, Superchunk, and Diarrhea Planet covering songs by some of Bloodshot's stable of artists (i.e., Ryan Adams, Old 97's, Cory Branan, and Justin Townes Earle). Bloodshot spent the year celebrating their success at surviving during a period when most independent record labels were going out of business.

In November 2019, Bloodshot celebrated its 25th anniversary by holding a concert/party and issuing another compilation album.

=== Chicago community and SXSW ===
Bloodshot had close ties to the Chicago community and particularly to the Hideout, a bar and music venue.

Starting in the mid 1990s, Bloodshot hosted a free barbecue-and-music day-long showcase at both Austin, Texas' SXSW and New York City's CMJ music festivals. The annual SXSW shows have often been anchored by performances by The Waco Brothers.

=== Sale of Bloodshot ===
In January 2019, Bloodshot artist, Lydia Loveless, accused Warshaw of attempting to cover up sexual harassment by Warshaw's long-term domestic partner, Mark Panick. Warshaw issued a public apology to Loveless, while also announcing she was stepping away from the label. A month later she announced that she was not just stepping away, but resigning, with Miller to continue the work of running the label with Warshaw still retaining 50% ownership. In mid-July 2020, after an internal audit, Bloodshot Records staff issued a statement further accusing Warshaw of long-term negligence in regard to royalty payments and accounting.

On October 19, 2021, Miller posted a message on the Bloodshot website saying that the office is permanently closed, and said "Regrettably, it is time for this phase of Bloodshot Records to come to an end". Just three days later, on October 22, 2021, Exceleration Music announced that it had purchased Bloodshot from Miller and Warshaw.

With the sale of Bloodshot, Dave Hansen, a principal with Exceleration said "Bloodshot is a vitally important part of American music history, a genre-defining label founded on passion and vision, dedicated to bringing a unique set of artists from its musical orbit to the world." Warshaw said, "This passing of the torch ensures that the legacy of nurturing and celebrating unique indie music will live on."

In early 2023, Bloodshot, under Exceleration, announced that it had signed new contracts with several artists, including three who had previously worked with Bloodshot, and would shortly start releasing new recordings again. As of early 2025, the reconstituted Bloodshot Records appears to carry somewhere between eight and eighteen artistic acts, depending on the source.

== Artists ==
Some of the early artists who started out on Bloodshot went on to sign with larger major record labels, specifically Old 97's and Ryan Adams. Ryan Adams had one of the label's best-selling albums with the 2000 release Heartbreaker, having sold almost 500,000 copies. Neko Case had a licensing deal with Bloodshot Records in the United States and Mint Records in Canada before she signed with ANTI-.

Under Miller and Warshaw, Bloodshot included a diverse roster of artists, including the late Andre Williams, who wrote "Shake a Tail Feather," faced challenges, and then had a career renaissance making records at Bloodshot. Bloodshot included bands and projects by several members of The Mekons, including Jon Langford, Sally Timms, and Rico Bell.

- Al Scorch‡
- Alejandro Escovedo
- Andre Williams‡
- Andrew Bird
- Banditos‡
- Barrence Whitfield and the Savages‡
- Ben Kweller
- Ben Weaver
- The Blacks
- Bobby Bare, Jr.‡
- The Bottle Rockets‡
- Charlie Pickett
- Cordero
- Cory Branan
- Danbert Nobacon
- The Deadstring Brothers‡
- The Detroit Cobras‡
- Devil in a Woodpile
- Dex Romweber‡
- Dollar Store
- Eddie Spaghetti‡
- Exene Cervenka
- Firewater‡
- Freakwater‡
- Gore Gore Girls
- Graham Parker‡
- Grievous Angels
- Ha Ha Tonka‡
- I'm Not Jim
- Jason Hawk Harris‡
- J.C. Brooks & The Uptown Sound
- Jim & Jennie and the Pinetops
- Jon Langford‡
- Jon Rauhouse
- Justin Townes Earle
- Kelly Hogan
- Laura Jane Grace & The Devouring Mothers‡
- Th' Legendary Shack*Shakers
- Luke Winslow-King‡
- Lydia Loveless‡
- Maggie Björklund‡
- Mark Pickerel
- The Meat Purveyors
- Mekons‡
- Moonshine Willy
- Murder by Death‡
- Neal Pollack
- Neko Case
- Nora O'Connor
- Old 97's
- Paul Burch
- The Pine Valley Cosmonauts‡
- Rex Hobart & the Misery Boys
- Rico Bell
- The Riptones
- Robbie Fulks‡
- Roger Knox‡
- Rosie Flores‡
- Ruby Boots‡
- Ryan Adams
- The Sadies
- Sally Timms
- Sarah Shook & the Disarmers‡
- The Scotland Yard Gospel Choir
- Scott H. Biram‡
- Scroat Belly
- The Silos
- Split Lip Rayfield
- Trailer Bride
- Vandoliers ‡
- The Volebeats
- Waco Brothers‡
- Wayne Hancock‡
- Wee Hairy Beasties
- Whiskeytown
- Whitey Morgan and the 78's
- William Elliott Whitmore‡
- The Yawpers‡
- The Yayhoos

‡ denotes active Bloodshot artists

== Discography ==
=== Compilations ===
Bloodshot Records began its life as a label by releasing compilations of tracks not released elsewhere.

- 1994: For a Life of Sin: A Compilation of Insurgent Chicago Country
- 1995: Hell Bent: Insurgent Country Volume 2
- 1996: Nashville, The Other Side of the Alley
- 1997: Straight Outta Boone County
- 1999: Poor Little Knitter on the Road: A Tribute to The Knitters
- 2000: Down to the Promised Land: 5 Years of Bloodshot Records
- 2002: The Bottle Let Me Down
- 2002: Making Singles, Drinking Doubles
- 2003: The Slaughter Rule (Original Movie Soundtrack)
- 2004: Hard Headed Woman: A Celebration of Wanda Jackson
- 2005: For a Decade of Sin: 11 Years of Bloodshot Records
- 2006: Bloodied but Unbowed: The Soundtrack
- 2007: Just One More: A Musical Tribute to Larry Brown
- 2011: No One Got Hurt: Bloodshot's 15th Anniversary @ The Hideout Block Party
- 2014: While No One Was Looking: Toasting 20 Years of Bloodshot Records
- 2019: Too Late to Pray: Defiant Chicago Roots

=== Bloodshot Revival ===
Bloodshot Revival/Soundies: A series of historic transcription acetate recordings that were leased to radio stations for airplay but never sold at the time of recording.

- 1999: Rex Allen: Last of the Great Singing Cowboys
- 2001: Johnny Bond: Country and Western
- 1999: Spade Cooley: Shame On You
- 2000: Jimmie Davis: Louisiana
- 1999: Pee Wee King: Country Hoedown
- 2000: Hank Penny: Crazy Rhythm
- 2001: Sons of the Pioneers: Symphonies of the Sage
- 2004: The Sundowners: Chicago Country Legends
- 1999: Hank Thompson: Hankworld

=== Partnerships ===
- Old Town School Recordings with Old Town School of Folk Music
- Invisible China with Martin Atkins (from Public Image Ltd (PiL))

=== DVD ===
The label planned to release a 10th anniversary DVD (Bloodied But Unbowed: Bloodshot Records' Life In The Trenches) in 2004, but it was not released until late 2006.

- 2006: Bloodied But Unbowed: Bloodshot Records' Life In The Trenches – 10th Anniversary DVD

== See also ==
- Bloodshot Records artists
- Bloodshot Records albums
- List of record labels
- Chicago Music
- Mekons
- The Hideout
