= The Mekons discography =

British post-punk band discography

The following is a list of releases by the British post-punk band the Mekons. The band formed in 1976 as an art collective and one of the longest-running and most prolific of the first-wave punk rock bands. They have released some 16 studio albums; their first The Quality of Mercy Is Not Strnen was released in 1979, while their most recent is 2025's Horror.

Although the band's lineup changed over the years, the core line-up includes founder members Jon Langford (vocals, guitar) and Tom Greenhalgh (vocals, guitar), as well as Sally Timms (vocals) and Susie Honeyman (violin).

== Discography ==
=== Albums ===
- 1979: The Quality of Mercy Is Not Strnen (Virgin Records / Blue Plate-Caroline Records)
- 1980: The Mekons aka Devils Rats and Piggies a Special Message from Godzilla (Red Rhino Records, Cherry Red Records, Quarterstick Records) – re-released in 1997
- 1982: The Mekons Story (CNT Productions, Sin Record Company/Feel Good All Over, Buried Treasures Records) – re-released in 1986
- 1985: Fear and Whiskey (Sin Record Company; re-released in 2002 and 2019, via bandcamp, by Quarterstick Records)
- 1986: The Edge of the World (Sin Record Company; re-released in 1996 and 2019, via bandcamp, by Quarterstick Records)
- 1987: The Mekons Honky Tonkin' (Sin Record Company, Twin/Tone Records, Low Noise America; re-released 2004 by Quarterstick Records)
- 1988: So Good It Hurts (Sin Record Company/Cooking Vinyl, Rough Trade Records Germany)
- 1989: The Mekons Rock 'n Roll (A&M Records, Blast First, Rough Trade Records Germany; re-released circa 2001 by Collectors' Choice Music, and circa 2020, via bandcamp)
- 1991: The Curse of the Mekons (A&M Records, Blast First, Rough Trade Records Germany; re-released circa 2001 by Collectors' Choice Music)
- 1993: I ♥ Mekons (Quarterstick Records/Touch and Go Records, Rough Trade Records Germany)
- 1994: Retreat from Memphis (Quarterstick Records, Rough Trade Records Germany)
- 1996: Pussy, King of the Pirates with Kathy Acker (Quarterstick Records)
- 1996: Mekons United book and CD (Quarterstick Records)
- 1998: Me (Quarterstick Records)
- 2000: Journey to the End of the Night (Quarterstick Records)
- 2002: OOOH! (Out of Our Heads) (Quarterstick Records)
- 2004: Punk Rock (Quarterstick Records)
- 2007: Natural (Quarterstick Records)
- 2011: Ancient & Modern 1911–2011 (Bloodshot Records)
- 2015: Jura, by the mini-Mekons with Robbie Fulks (Bloodshot Records)
- 2016: Existentialism (Bloodshot Records)
- 2018: It Is Twice Blessed, by the Mekons 77 (Slow Things)
- 2019: Deserted (Bloodshot Records)
- 2020: Exquisite (self released via bandcamp; 2022 vinyl by Glitterbeat Records)
- 2025: Horror (Fire Records (UK))
- 2026: Horrorble (Mekons vs Tony Maimone In Dub Conference) (Fire Records (UK))

=== EPs ===
- 1983: The English Dancing Master (CNT Records, Rough Trade Records)
- 1986: Crime and Punishment (Sin Record Company)
- 1986: Slightly South of the Border (Sin Record Company)
- 1987: Hole In The Ground / Sin City / Prince Of Darkness (Sin Record Company, Cooking Vinyl, Twin/Tone Records)
- 1989: The Dream and Lie of... (A&M Records, Blast First)
- 1990: F.U.N. '90 (A&M Records, Blast First)
- 1990: Greetings Eight (Materiali Sonori, Italy)
- 1992: Wicked Midnite/All I Want (Loud Music)
- 1993: Millionaire (Quarterstick Records)
- 2007: The Brackenrigg EP (download only)

=== Singles ===
- 1978: "Never Been In A Riot" b/w "32 Weeks" and "Heart & Soul" − FAST 1 (Fast Product)
- 1978: "Where Were You?" b/w "I'll Have To Dance Then (On My Own)" − FAST 7 (Fast Product)
- 1979: "Work All Week" b/w "Unknown Wrecks" − VS300 (Virgin Records)
- 1980: "Teeth" b/w "Guardian" and "Kill" b/w "Stay Cool" (Virgin Records) – double 7"
- 1980: "Snow" b/w "Another One" (Red Rhino Records)
- 1981: "This Sporting Life" b/w "Frustration" − CNT1 (CNT Records)
- 1982: "This Sporting Life" b/w "Fight the Cuts" − CNT8 (CNT Records)
- 1986: "Hello Cruel World" b/w "Alone & Forsaken" − Sin004 (Sin Record Company)
- 1988: "Ghosts of American Astronauts" (Sin Record Company, Cooking Vinyl, Twin/Tone Records)
- 1990: "Crap Rap" b/w "Keep On Hoppin'" with The Ex (Clawfist)
- 1990: "Sheffield Park" b/w "Having a Party" (Blast First)
- 1990: "Makes No Difference" b/w "Having A Party" (Blast First)
- 1995: "Untitled 1" b/w "Untitled 2" − QS31 (Quarterstick Records)
- 2017: Mekonville: "How Many Stars Are Out Tonight" b/w "Still Waiting" − (Sin/Slow)

=== Compilations ===
- 1980: Mutant Pop (PVC/Jem), a US reissue of early Fast Product singles, including the Mekons first 7", Never Been in a Riot b/w 32 Weeks, as well as Where Were You?, both first released in 1978.
- 1985: "They Shall Not Pass" CNT Miner's Strike compilation includes "Fight The Cuts" and "This Sporting Life"
- 1986: The Mekons Story—re-released in 1993/2008
- 1987: Mekons New York (ROIR) – re-released in 1990/2001 as New York: On the Road 86–87
- 1989: Original Sin (Rough Trade Records) – Collects together Fear and Whiskey, parts of The English Dancing Master, Crime and Punishment EP, and Slightly South of the Border EPs
- 1999: I Have Been to Heaven and Back: Hen's Teeth and other lost fragments of unpopular culture, Vol. 1 (Quarterstick Records)
- 1999: Where Were You? Hen's Teeth and other lost fragments of unpopular culture, Vol. 2 (Quarterstick Records)
- 2001: Curse of the Mekons/Fun '90— combined reissue (Collectors' Choice Music)
- 2004: Heaven & Hell: The Very Best of the Mekons (Cooking Vinyl)
- 2011: Me-Tunes (not on label)

=== Freakons ===
- 2021 Freakons (Fluff & Gravy Records)

=== Miscellaneous ===
- 2002: Hello Cruel World: Selected Lyrics [of 125 songs] book, written & illustrated by The Mekons (Verse Chorus Press; ISBN 978-1891241147)
- 2016: Existentialism book, including Existentialism CD (Sin Publications/Verse Chorus Press, distributed by Bloodshot Records)
