= Journey to the End of the Night (Mekons album) =

13th studio album by The Mekons

Studio album by the Mekons
- Released: 7 March 2000
- Genres: Post-punk, alternative country
- Length: 43:16
- Label: Quarterstick

The Mekons chronology
Me (1998)	Journey to the End of the Night (2000)	OOOH! (Out of Our Heads) (2002)

Professional ratings
Review scores
Source	Rating
AllMusic	4/5 stars
The Austin Chronicle	4/4 stars
The Encyclopedia of Popular Music	4/5 stars
Pitchfork	7.1/10
Rolling Stone	3.5/5 stars
Spin	8/10

Journey to the End of the Night is the 13th studio album by the Mekons. It was released on audio CD on 7 March 2000 by Quarterstick Records. The album was recorded in London at the MontiSound & Corina Studios and also in Chicago at the Stinkpole & Kingsize Sound Labs, it was then finally mixed and mastered by Kenny Sluiter in Kingside.

== Track listing ==
1. "Myth" – 3:52
2. "Out in the Night" – 3:31
3. "Last Weeks of the War" – 2:59
4. "City of London" – 4:02
5. "Tina" – 3:56
6. "The Flood" – 4:51
7. "Cast No Shadows" – 3:03
8. "Ordinary Night" – 3:19
9. "Powers & Horror" – 2:42
10. "Neglect" – 4:02
11. "Something to Be Scared Of" – 2:38
12. "Last Night on Earth" – 3:42
13. "...and Heracles Smiled" – 0:42

== Personnel ==
- Steve Goulding – drums
- Susie Honeyman – fiddle
- Sarah Corina – bass, vocals
- Sally Timms – vocals
- Tom Greenhalgh – vocals, guitar, autoharp, piano
- Jon Langford – vocals, guitar, melodica, machines
- Rico Bell – vocals, accordion, harmonica
- Lu Edmonds – cumbus

Guest Appearances:

- Edith Frost, Kelly Hogan, Neko Case – backing vocals
- John Rice – electric sitar on "Cast No Shadows"
- Mitch Marlow – rhythm guitar on "Last Night on Earth"
