= Me (The Mekons album) =

Studio album by the Mekons
- Released: May 19, 1998
- Genres: Country rock, experimental rock
- Length: 63:54
- Label: Quarterstick

The Mekons chronology
Pussy, King of the Pirates (1996)	Me (1998)	Journey to the End of the Night (2000)

Me is a studio album by the British-American experimental rock group the Mekons, released on May 19, 1998, on Quarterstick Records. It is noted for featuring greater use of electronic musical instruments than their previous work.

== Critical reception ==
Professional ratings
Review scores
Source	Rating
AllMusic	3/5 stars
The Encyclopedia of Popular Music	3/5 stars
Rolling Stone	3.5/5 stars
The Village Voice	(choice cut)

In the Grand Rapids Press, Tim Pratt described Me as "a popcorn ball of chewy, sticky fun, combining subtly subversive lyrics with crunchy elements of rock, punk and electronic music and then mashed together in an oddball, yet tasty, musical treat." The Chicago Tribune's Rick Reger also reviewed the album favorably, writing that "Far from being a bizarre change of direction, "Me" ably upholds the Mekons' tradition of thwarting expectation and flouting convention." A review of the album in the Orlando Weekly stated that "There is something for everyone here. The fleeting string sections, noisy guitars, cheesy Stereolab-style keyboards, accordions and fiddles keep "Me" unpredictable and will leave you wondering what's next for these evolving musical chameleons."

== Track listing ==
1. "Enter the Lists" - 4:08
2. "Down" - 4:16
3. "Narrative" - 4:18
4. "Tourettes" - 3:19
5. "Flip Flop" - 4:30
6. "Gin & It" - 4:24
7. "Back to Back" - 3:49
8. "Come and Have a Go If You Think You're Hard Enough" - 3:15
9. "Men United" - 3:23
10. "Mirror" - 4:32
11. "Far Sub Dominant" - 6:43
12. "Whiskey Sex Shack" - 3:02
13. "Thunder" - 5:34
14. "Belly to Belly" - 8:41

== Personnel ==
- Rico Bell – accordion, vocals
- Rebecca Gates – backing vocals
- Sarah Corina – bass
- Steve Goulding – drums
- Susie Honeyman – fiddle
- Jon Langford, Tom Greenhalgh – guitar, vocals
- Ken Sluiter, the Mekons – recording and mastering
- Lu Edmonds – saz
- Sally Timms – vocals
