= Fear and Whiskey =

Studio album by the Mekons
- Released: 1985
- Recorded: 1984–1985
- Genres: Alternative rock, alternative country
- Length: 35:13
- Label: Sin
- Producer: Mekons

The Mekons chronology
The Mekons Story (1983)	Fear and Whiskey (1985)	The Edge of the World (1986)

Professional ratings
Review scores
Source	Rating
AllMusic	4.5/5 stars
Blender	4/5 stars
Christgau's Record Guide	A+
The Guardian	4/5 stars
Pitchfork	9.7/10
The Rolling Stone Album Guide	4.5/5 stars
Spin Alternative Record Guide	10/10
Uncut	4/5 stars

Fear and Whiskey is the fourth studio album by English rock band the Mekons. It was released in 1985 and marked a dramatic shift in their sound following a short hiatus. It has been credited as being one of the first alternative country albums, as it blends the band's previously-established punk rock style with a country music sound. Due to the limited production and distribution capabilities of parent label Sin Records, the initial album release was met with only modest commercial success but with broad critical praise. It remained largely unavailable until it was re-released in 2002 by Quarterstick Records, a subsidiary of Touch and Go Records.

The musical style represents a sharp break with the group's previous work, as fiddle, steel guitar, and harmonica are included, but the instrumentation of punk music is also present, particularly on the energetic "Hard to be Human Again". Tom Greenhalgh, one of the primary creative forces in the Mekons, commented that as he listened to a great deal of country music in the early 1980s "pretty soon the difference between the three chords of country and the three chords of punk became blurred." The album closes with a cover of Leon Payne's "Lost Highway".

== Reception ==
The album's lyrics describe a dark scenario of a community struggling to retain its capacity for joy and humanity through a devastating war. Rock critic Robert Christgau described it as "a sort of concept album sort of about life during wartime".

Spin said the album was, "From the border territory where folk meets country and country meets rock, it comes complete with poke-a-long. American western guitars, boy-next-door vocals, and subtle sound effects. Mekons country is where "Rocky Raccoon" was born. Full of tales. A mite surreal. Guitars twang like sheep brays."

The album was ranked No. 74 on Pitchfork's "Best Albums of the 1980s".

== Track listing ==
All tracks are written by the Mekons, except as noted.

No.	Title	Writer(s)	Length
1.	"Chivalry"		4:03
2.	"Trouble Down South"		4:15
3.	"Hard to Be Human Again"		3:58
4.	"Darkness and Doubt"		5:15
5.	"Psycho Cupid (Danceband on the Edge of Time)"		2:52
6.	"Flitcraft"		3:23
7.	"Country"		2:54
8.	"Abernant 1984/5"		2:21
9.	"Last Dance"		3:13
10.	"Lost Highway"	Leon Payne	2:59

== Personnel ==
- Jacqui Callis - vocals
- Lu Edmonds - bass
- John Gill - engineer, historical research, mixing
- Steve Goulding - drums
- Tom Greene - guitar, piano, vocals
- Tom Greenhalgh - mixing, vocals
- Suzie Honeyman - fiddle
- John Ingledew - photography
- Jon Langford - guitar, harp, vocals
- Ken Lite - bass, rhythm guitar, vocals
- The Mekons - composer, primary artist, producer
- Terry Nelson - walkie talkie
- Shelagh Quinn - engineer
- Dick Taylor - guitar
- Robert Sigmund Worby - drums
