= Punk Rock =

Punk rock is a music genre.

Punk Rock may refer to:

- Punk Rock (play), by Simon Stephens, 2009
- Punk Rock (album), by the Mekons, 2004

== See also ==
- Garage rock, sometimes called garage punk or '60s punk
