= Jock McFadyen =

British painter

Jock McFadyen RA (born 18 September 1950) is a contemporary British painter.

== Biography ==
McFadyen was born 18 September 1950 in Paisley, Scotland. As a teenager he attended Saturday morning classes at Glasgow School of Art. McFadyen moved to England in 1966 at the age of fifteen and was educated at Chelsea School of Art, gaining his BA in 1976 and MA in 1977. He taught one day a week at the Slade School of Art between 1980 and 2005. He married Carol Hambleton in 1972 and they had one son. He married his second wife Susie Honeyman (violin player in the Mekons) in 1991 and they have two children.

In 1981 McFadyen was appointed Artist in Residence at the National Gallery, London. During this period the painter resolved to make the observed world his subject rather than the witty conjectures with which he had graduated from Chelsea School of Art in 1977. The first pictures to emerge in the early eighties were populated by the waifs and strays of pre-Canary Wharf London. McFadyen was part of the diaspora of artists to the East End since the late sixties and says that the figures in his work of that period were not inventions but sightings of individuals and events of the time.

In 1991 McFadyen had a major solo exhibition Fragments From Berlin at The Imperial War Museum of works made in response to the dismantling of the Berlin Wall in 1991. In 1992 he was commissioned to design the set and costumes for Sir Kenneth MacMillan's last ballet The Judas Tree at the Royal Opera House, Covent Garden. It was at this point that the figure fell away from McFadyen's work. Full-blown urban landscape, sometimes on a monumental scale, emerged and continues to preoccupy the artist to this day.

Jock McFadyen claims Sickert as well as Whistler and L. S. Lowry among painterly influences from the past, while German and American realist film from the 1970s as well as the contemporary novel and music are influences which are more significant to the artist than those from contemporary painting. During the 1990s McFadyen found a fellow traveller in the writer Iain Sinclair whose Downriver and Lights out for the territory mirrored McFadyen's preoccupation with the eastern plains of the city and its estuary. McFadyen had previously worked with the novelists Howard Jacobson and Will Self on prints and booklets. In 2001 Iain Sinclair wrote Walking up walls to accompany Jock McFadyen's solo exhibition at Agnews and Lund Humphries published a monograph on the artist, A book about a painter, written by David Cohen. In 2004 McFadyen collaborated with Sinclair and others to create an exhibition about the A13 at the Wapping Project curated by the Architecture Foundation.

In 2005 McFadyen and his wife Susie Honeyman started The Grey Gallery, a nomadic entity set up to work with artists, writers and musicians on a project by project basis with the aim of working across disciplines and to work outside of the existing dealer and curator conventions. Projects have included the sculptor Richard Wilson, painter Bob and Roberta Smith, and musicians Little Sparta and Giles Perring.

McFadyen currently lives and works in London, Edinburgh and the Scottish Borders. He has had over 50 solo exhibitions and his work is held by 30 public collections in the UK as well as private and corporate collections.

McFadyen was elected a Royal Academician in 2012 and an Honorary Royal Scottish Academician in 2022.

In 2019 the Royal Academy published a second monograph on the artist by architecture critic and writer Rowan Moore. McFadyen curated the Royal Academy Summer Exhibition in 2019.

A series of major exhibitions planned to celebrate the artist's 70th birthday began in November 2020 with Jock McFadyen Goes to The Pictures at Edinburgh's City Art Centre, followed by Lost Boat Party at Dovecot Studios, Edinburgh, a retrospective, Jock McFadyen Goes to The Lowry at The Lowry in Salford, 2021, Tourist Without a Guidebook at the Royal Academy in 2022,

In 2026, McFadyen with Jem Finer presented Underground (and Surface) at the Guildhall in London, running from February to September.
