= C. Michael Norton =

American painter

Kandy Red Sentinel, 2017

C. Michael Norton (born 1951) is an American artist based in New York City. Since the early 2000s, Norton has been best known for his large-scale abstractions on raw linen. He is represented by UNIX Gallery in New York.

After working first as a sculptor, Norton turned to painting as his predominant medium by the late 1980s. Educated as a sculptor, his paintings were made by a variety of tools beyond the traditional paintbrush, such as mud knives, rollers and squeegees. Some paintings evolved from markings collected by pieces of linen taped to the floor, then intuitively built upon.

Norton's work has been exhibited at institutions including the Sunshine International Museum and the Fifth Beijing International Biennale at the National Art Museum of China, Beijing; Albissola/ America/Arte” Museo Civico d’Arte Contemporanea, Albissola, Italy, the Torrance Museum of Art, Torrance, California, the San Francisco Museum of Art, San Francisco, California. It has been reviewed by prominent art publications including Art in America, which called Norton's paintings "architecturally structured, with an allover interplay between hard-edged forms and flat yet infinite space indicated by areas of raw canvas", ARTnews, and Artcritical, and he has received critical acclaim from Eleanor Heartney, Raphael Rubinstein, Stephen Westfall, Richard Vine, and David Cohen, among others. In Westfall's review of a 2013 exhibition at Thomas Punzmann Fine Arts in Frankfurt, he describes Norton's art historical lineage with artist such as Gerhard Richter, Jasper Johns, Frank Stella and Francis Bacon.
