= The Curse of the Mekons =

1991 album by the Mekons

Studio album by the Mekons
- Released: 1991
- Genre: Alternative rock; post-punk
- Length: 51:13
- Label: A&M; Blast First; Rough Trade Germany
- Producer: The Mekons; Ian Caple

The Mekons chronology
The Mekons Rock 'n Roll (1989)	The Curse of the Mekons (1991)	I Love Mekons (1993)

The Curse of the Mekons is the ninth studio album by English rock band the Mekons, released in 1991. Due to a disagreement with A&M Records, the album was not released in the U.S. until a decade later, being available only as an import from their British label Blast First. It has been hailed by critics as one of the best of the Mekons' career.

It includes a cover of John Scott Sherrill's "Wild and Blue".

== Background ==
The "curse" of the title referred to the band's long-lasting lack of commercial success despite their increasingly lauded critical profile. New York Times critic Jon Pareles wrote that the band "makes great, raucous, tuneful rock albums, but no one can figure out how to sell them." Founding member Tom Greenhalgh also said that the "curse" was meant ironically as a nod to the Mekons' survival as a band for a decade and a half, as if they had been doomed to "still being around (as a rock band) despite everything else".

The Curse of the Mekons was recorded during a period when the band was dispirited and unhappy about their comparative lack of success while alternative rock as a genre was reaching its highest popular acclaim. By this point, the band itself had also splintered geographically, with different members living in Chicago, Brooklyn, and England. The lettering on the album cover was written by leader Jon Langford using his own blood; it also included what writer Greg Kot described as a "witch's anti-curse written in Nordic script, designed to reverse years of misfortune".

After years of increasing critical buzz, the Mekons had signed to major label A&M Records for their previous album, 1989's The Mekons Rock 'n Roll. But despite earning widespread critical acclaim, the album sold poorly in America, reportedly around 23,000 copies. The band's relationship with the label became fractured, with the Mekons unhappy that A&M had failed to capitalize on the band's critical success. The group released a four-song EP on A&M, F.U.N. '90, before recording The Curse of the Mekons. The label's acquisition by Polygram left the band without institutional support at A&M, which dropped the Mekons and shelved the album. It was not released in the U.S. until 2001.

After the recording of The Curse of the Mekons, drummer Steve Goulding and bassist Lu Edmonds both quit the band; they were replaced by, respectively, John Langley of the Blue Aeroplanes and Sarah Corina.

== Reception ==
Professional ratings
Review scores
Source	Rating
AllMusic	4.5/5 stars
Robert Christgau	A−

The album received positive reviews at the time of its release, and has continued to be a critical favorite over time. The album was named No. 10 of the top 10 albums of 1991 in the Village Voice's 1991 Pazz & Jop critics poll, the first import ever to make the list.

Robert Christgau, in his liner notes for the album's 2001 re-release, noted that the album captured the band's pessimism about a future dominated by capitalism after the end of the Cold War and apparent failure of socialism, saying that "Curse of the Mekons fleshes out their anarchist principles by abjuring power—it's messy, slightly inchoate, as unreconstructed and inconclusive as their nevertheless radical politics."

The New York Times' Pareles called it "a brilliant album that wraps tuneful rockers around topics like German reunification, the drug business and the collapse of Communism in Eastern Europe", and wrote that the band had moved past their earlier, deliberate amateurism, saying that their songs of this era were "loose and rangy" and "have a muscular beat and catchy guitar riffs, yet they never sound too polished."

Mike Boehm of the Los Angeles Times wrote that in comparison to the hard-driving sound of their previous album, Curse "eases back on the throttle a bit, giving more emphasis to the country-music roots that have marked the band’s work since the mid-'80s," but also noted that the lyrics were just as biting as earlier: "The songs are full of images of a culture out of whack, numbed by drugs and the desire for consumer commodities, subject to authoritarian control and ravaged by violence."

John Dougan of AllMusic called The Curse of the Mekons the second-best Mekons album after 1989's The Mekons Rock 'n Roll, writing that the album was "heady stuff, and not all happy, but remarkably assured and very rewarding." In the book Rough Guide to Rock, critic Huw Bucknell called the album "subtle, atmospheric and criminally underexposed". Trouser Press called the album "among the Mekons' most accomplished" and praised the album's eclectic sound, saying it created a "bizarre sonic odyssey" moving from the "Stonesy-Cajun hook of the title song" to metal, reggae with mariachi horns, and psychedelia. In 2014, Timothy and Elizabeth Bracy of music website Stereogum called the album "brilliant roots rock with an authoritative swagger" and listed two songs from the album, "The Curse" and "Waltz", among their top 10 Mekons songs of all time.

== Track listing ==
All tracks are written by the Mekons, except "Wild and Blue" by John Scott Sherrill.

No.	Title	Length
1.	"The Curse"	3:45
2.	"Blue Arse"	2:50
3.	"Wild and Blue"	2:54
4.	"Authority"	5:00
5.	"Secrets"	5:20
6.	"Nocturne"	4:57
7.	"Sorcerer"	4:33
8.	"Brutal"	4:35
9.	"Funeral"	3:28
10.	"Lyric"	3:57
11.	"Waltz"	4:25
12.	"100% Song"	5:21
