= Out of Our Heads (disambiguation) =

Out of Our Heads is a 1965 album by the Rolling Stones.

Out of Our Heads may also refer to:

- "Out of Our Heads" (Sam Smith song)
- "Out of Our Heads" (Sheryl Crow song)
- "Out of Our Heads" (Take That song)
- OOOH! (Out of Our Heads), 2002 album by the Mekons
