= Cowboy Sally's Twilight Laments for Lost Buckaroos =

Studio album by Sally Timms
- Released: 1999
- Genre: Country
- Label: Bloodshot
- Producer: Sally Timms, Jon Langford

Sally Timms chronology
Cowboy Sally (1997)	Cowboy Sally's Twilight Laments for Lost Buckaroos (1999)	Songs of False Hope and High Values (2000)

Cowboy Sally's Twilight Laments for Lost Buckaroos (stylized as Cowboy Sally's Twilight Laments ... for Lost Buckaroos) is an album by the English musician Sally Timms, released in 1999. The album is presented as an ersatz radio program for modern cowboys.

Timms supported the album by touring with Freakwater.

== Production ==
The album contains covers of songs written by Johnny Cash, Jill Sobule, Robbie Fulks, and Jeff Tweedy, among others. Timms cowrote three of the album's songs with fellow Mekon Jon Langford. Many Chicago musicians played on Cowboy Sally, including Tweedy, Tortoise's John Herndon, and members of the Pine Valley Cosmonauts. Produced by Timms and Langford, the album was recorded in May 1999, in Chicago.

== Critical reception ==
Professional ratings
Review scores
Source	Rating
AllMusic	4.5/5 stars
Robert Christgau	(2-star Honorable Mention)
Los Angeles Daily News	4/4 stars
Pitchfork	6.0/10
Spin	8/10

Pitchfork thought that "the production isn't the earthiest in the world, but the arrangements are simple and tight: it's mostly pedal steel guitar, fiddle, and occasional banjo-picking over delicate acoustic strumming." Entertainment Weekly wrote: "Avoiding Nashville’s tacky gloss and the neo-traditionalists’ killjoy sobriety, Timms sings old-fashioned country with respect and a dose of deadpan humor." No Depression opined that "one reason the disc is so different from Nashville’s mainstream product is that it has a country and western vibe, which you never hear on country radio, with the exception of the occasional George Strait number." The Chicago Tribune stated that Timms "sings midtempo lullabies that suggest our honky-tonk heroes were all just 'Dreaming Cowboys'—that the wide open spaces of the West were just another metaphor for loneliness that no amount of booze could quench."

The New York Times determined that the album "flawlessly expresses her lonesome sensibility," writing that Timms's "voice, a secretive murmur refined by her native English accent, is the stuff of lullabies." Greil Marcus, in Salon, concluded that "her touch is light, and deceptive; her reserves of depth seem bottomless... But nothing she's done before suggests the exquisite balance of this disc." Spin noted that, "from the Velvet Underground's 'Lonesome Cowboy Bill' to Modest Mouse's 'Cowboy Dan', the best cowboys in rock songs are souls lost in a world they didn't create, and so it is with 'Dreaming Cowboy', which leads off Timms' record with a spate of lovely melancholy." The Los Angeles Daily News thought that Timms's "ethereal, yet precise vocals give every song a warm, mescal-and-honey resonance."

AllMusic wrote that "the warm, silky texture of Timms' voice is nicely matched to the moody country ethic of this album."

== Track listing ==
No.	Title	Length
1.	"Dreaming Cowboy"
2.	"The Sad Milkman"
3.	"Dark Sun"
4.	"In Bristol Town One Bright Day"
5.	"Sweetheart Waltz"
6.	"Snowbird"
7.	"Cry Cry Cry"
8.	"When the Roses Bloom Again"
9.	"Cancion Para Mi Padre"
10.	"Rock Me to Sleep"
11.	"Seminole Wind"
12.	"Drunk by Noon"
13.	"Old Flames Can't Hold a Candle to You"
14.	"Tennessee Waltz"
15.	"Long Black Veil"
