= Deserted (album) =

Studio album by the Mekons
- Released: 29 March 2019
- Genre: Punk rock
- Length: 41:55
- Label: Bloodshot

The Mekons chronology
Existentialism (2016)	Deserted (2019)	Exquisite (2020)

Deserted is a studio album by British punk rock band the Mekons, released on 29 March 2019 on Bloodshot Records. Recorded in California near Joshua Tree National Park, it is the band's first studio album of new material since the release of Ancient & Modern 1911–2011 eight years earlier.

Professional ratings
Aggregate scores
Source	Rating
Metacritic	83/100
Review scores
Source	Rating
AllMusic	4/5 stars
Chicago Tribune	3.5/4 stars
Pitchfork	7.2/10
Rolling Stone	4/5 stars

== Track listing ==
1. Lawrence of California
2. Harar 1883
3. In the Sun/The Galaxy Explodes
4. How Many Stars?
5. In the Desert
6. Mirage
7. Weimar Vending Machine/Priest?
8. Andromeda
9. After the Rain
