= The Mekons Honky Tonkin' =

Studio album by the Mekons
- Released: 1987
- Labels: Sin, Twin/Tone
- Producer: The Mekons

The Mekons chronology
| The Edge of the World (1986) | The Mekons Honky Tonkin' (1987) | New York (1987) |

The Mekons Honky Tonkin' is an album by the British band the Mekons, released in 1987. It was their first album to be released in the United States and the band's third country music-influenced album. The band supported the album with a North American tour.

== Production ==
The liner notes include book recommendations for most of the songs. "If They Hang You" commends Dashiell Hammett for his conduct in front of a HUAC hearing. "The Trimdon Grange Explosion" is about a 19th-century colliery explosion; "Hole in the Ground" is also about the mining life. "Sympathy for the Mekons" adapts themes from "Sympathy for the Devil".

== Critical reception ==
Professional ratings
Review scores
| Source | Rating |
|---|---|
| AllMusic | 4/5 stars |
| Robert Christgau | B+ |
| The Encyclopedia of Popular Music | 3/5 stars |
| The Gazette | 8/10 |
| MusicHound Rock: The Essential Album Guide | 3/5 stars |
| The Rolling Stone Album Guide | 3/5 stars |
| Spin Alternative Record Guide | 7/10 |

Robert Christgau considered the Mekons "just a catchy, rocking Brit country band with more enthusiasm than skill in the vocal department and lyrics." Trouser Press wrote that "the genially appealing music, a well-organized wash of fiddles, accordion, guitars and simple drums, makes few demands but keeps the folky standards high." The Los Angeles Times stated that "the closest reference point for U.S. listeners might be the Pogues, though the Mekons' anarchic approach tolerates a fair degree of amateurism."

The New York Times noted that, "for all their informality, the songs gleam with intelligence," and concluded that "the Mekons bring the fatalism of country and Celtic music into the fractured 1980's." The Washington Post determined that "the musical results are smoother than on the band's previous country forays, but the lyrics remain smart, funny and wary." The Star Tribune listed The Mekons Honky Tonkin' as the 19th best album of 1987.

AllMusic deemed the album "just short of a masterpiece," writing that the version of "The Trimdon Grange Explosion" "was a remarkable meeting of folk-rock's earnestness and punk's spitting wrath which ranks with the group's most powerful recorded moments."

== Track listing ==
| No. | Title | Length |
|---|---|---|
| 1. | "I Can't Find My Money" |
| 2. | "Hole in the Ground" |
| 3. | "Sleepless Nights" |
| 4. | "Keep On Hoppin'" |
| 5. | "Charlie Cake Park" |
| 6. | "If They Hang You" |
| 7. | "Prince of Darkness" |
| 8. | "Kidnapped" |
| 9. | "Sympathy for the Mekons" |
| 10. | "Spit" |
| 11. | "The Trimdon Grange Explosion" |
| 12. | "Please Don't Let Me Love You" |
| 13. | "Gin Palace" |
