= The Three Johns =

English post-punk/indie rock band

- Origin: Leeds, England
- Genres: Post-punk, indie rock
- Years active: 1981–1990, 2012–2017
- Labels: CNT, Abstract, T.I.M., Caroline Records, ROIR, Low Noise, Tupelo Recording Company
- Past members: Jon Langford; John Hyatt; Phillip "John" Brennan

The Three Johns were an English post-punk/indie rock band formed in 1981 in Leeds, England, originally consisting of guitarist Jon Langford (co-founder of the Mekons), vocalist John Hyatt and bassist Phillip "John" Brennan, augmented by a drum machine.

== History ==
The band initially formed just before the 1981 wedding of Prince Charles and Diana Spencer, and their first gig was to be part of a "Funk the Wedding" event, but they were refused permission to play because they were drunk. They signed to CNT Records in 1982, which Langford jointly founded, releasing two singles and an EP for the label. A reworking of the Mekons' "English White Boy Engineer", which attacked hypocritical attitudes towards South Africa and apartheid, led to the band being labelled as left-wing rockers. The band explained: "We're not a socialist band. We're a group of socialists who are in a band. It's a fine distinction but an important one". Their left-wing leanings were further evidenced by the sleeve of their 1984 Atom Drum Bop album, which carried the words "Rock 'n' Roll Versus Thaatchiism", a reference to then Prime Minister Margaret Thatcher and her marketing by Saatchi & Saatchi. On 7 July 1985, The Three Johns played at the GLC's Jobs for a Change festival in London's Battersea Park.

The band regularly appeared in the UK Indie Chart during the mid-1980s, with singles such as "A.W.O.L.", "Death of the European" (an NME "Single of the Week"), and "Brainbox (He's a Brainbox)". During the band's career, the members maintained their day jobs: Langford as a graphic designer and Hyatt a teacher of fine art at Leeds Polytechnic.

The band recorded six sessions for John Peel's BBC Radio 1 show, and reached No. 14 in the 1985 Festive Fifty with "Death of the European". In 1988 Tom Greenhalgh, Langford's colleague in the Mekons, collaborated with members of the Three Johns as the Jelly Bishops to release the five-song EP "Kings Of Barstool Mountain".

The band split up in late 1988 after a disastrous US tour, but reformed in 1990, releasing Eat Your Sons, a concept album about cannibalism, before splitting again. Langford continued with the Mekons, later releasing a solo album, while Hyatt concentrated on his academic career. They reformed again in 2012, playing five shows, and continued to perform intermittently through 2017 in the UK, mostly in the Manchester and Leeds-Bradford areas.

Vocalist John Hyatt died after suffering from neck and head cancer on 4 December 2023.

== Discography ==
Chart placings shown are from the UK Indie Chart.

=== Studio albums ===
- Atom Drum Bop (1984, Abstract) No. 2
- The World by Storm (1986, Abstract) No. 4
- The Death of Everything (1988, T.I.M/Caroline Records) No. 19
- Deathrocker Scrapbook (1988, ROIR)
- Eat Your Sons (1990, Low Noise/Tupelo Recording Company)

=== Singles and EPs ===
- English White Boy Engineer (1982, CNT)
- Pink Headed Bug (1983, CNT) No. 44
- Men Like Monkeys EP (1983, CNT)
- A.W.O.L. EP (1983, Abstract) No. 14
- Some History EP (1983, Abstract) No. 17
- Do the Square Thing (1984, Abstract) No. 6
- Death of the European (1985, Abstract) No. 3
- Brainbox (He's a Brainbox) (1985, Abstract) No. 3
- Sold Down the River (1986, Abstract) No. 10
- Never and Always (1987, Abstract) No. 5
- Torches of Liberty (1988, Abstract)

As Jelly Bishops, with Tom Greenhalgh

- Kings Of Barstool Mountain (1988, Last Time Round)

=== Live albums ===
- Live in Chicago (1987, Last Time Round Records)

=== Compilation albums ===
- (Crime Pays...Rock and Roll in the) Demonocracy - The Singles 1982-1986 (1986, Abstract)
- The Best of The Three Johns (1996, Dojo)
- Volume (2015, Buried Treasure)
