= Natural (The Mekons album) =

Studio album by the Mekons
- Released: 21 August 2007
- Genres: Post-punk, alternative country
- Length: 46:15
- Label: Quarterstick

The Mekons chronology
Punk Rock (2004)	Natural (2007)	Ancient & Modern 1911–2011 (2011)

Natural is an album by the Mekons. It was released on 21 August 2007 by Quarterstick Records.

== Production ==
The album was recorded in four days in the Lake District, England, the band's first album to be recorded in their homeland in 16 years. Tom Greenhalgh and Jon Langford were the only original Mekons to play on the album.

== Critical reception ==
Professional ratings
Aggregate scores
Source	Rating
Metacritic	77%
Review scores
Source	Rating
AllMusic	3.5/5 stars
The A.V. Club	B−
Robert Christgau	B+
MusicOMH	3/5 stars
Pitchfork	7.9/10
Rolling Stone	3/5 stars
Tiny Mix Tapes	3/5 stars

PopMatters wrote that the band "turn the volume down, break out the wooden instruments and craft haunting, bone-clinking songs about mortality." Spin wrote that the Mekons are "at their red-eyed best here, skirting the edges of chaos on ragged-but-right tunes like the harmonica-fueled tall tale 'The Old Fox' and the fractured reggae shuffle 'Cockermouth.'” Exclaim! called Natural "a stirring folk punk record that recalls the organic eclecticism of the Clash's Sandinista!"

== Track listing ==
1. "Dark Dark Dark" – 4:57
2. "Dickie Chalkie and Nobby" – 3:05
3. "The Old Fox" – 3:50
4. "White Stone Door" – 3:58
5. "Shocking Curse Bird" – 2:41
6. "Give Me Wine or Money" – 3:19
7. "Diamonds" – 4:06
8. "Burning in the Desert Burning" – 3:44
9. "The Hope and the Anchor" – 3:36
10. "Cockermouth" – 5:03
11. "Zeroes and Ones" – 3:47
12. "Perfect Mirror" – 4:19
13. "Old Fox Lu Version" (mp3 only bonus track)
