= Retreat from Memphis =

Studio album by the Mekons
- Released: 2 May 1994
- Label: Quarterstick
- Producer: Ducky

The Mekons chronology
Millionaire EP (1993)	Retreat from Memphis (1994)	Pussy, King of the Pirates (1996)

Retreat from Memphis is an album by English band the Mekons, released in 1994. It followed a few years of label troubles that saw the band considering a breakup. The band supported the album by touring with Man or Astroman?

== Production ==
The album was recorded in Chicago. Some of its songs engaged with military motifs; many were recorded after the band had played them on a 1993 tour. The Mekons brought in a new drummer for the recording sessions. Susie Honeyman, the band's violinist, was on maternity leave during much of the production of Retreat from Memphis.

"Our Bad Dream", about the Mekons' time with Warner Bros. Records, incorporated elements of rap music. "Ice Rink in Berlin" was sung by Sally Timms.

== Critical reception ==
Professional ratings
Review scores
Source	Rating
AllMusic	3/5 stars
Chicago Tribune	3.5/4 stars
The Encyclopedia of Popular Music	3/5 stars
Entertainment Weekly	B+
MusicHound Rock: The Essential Album Guide	3/5 stars
(The New) Rolling Stone Album Guide	3/5 stars
Spin Alternative Record Guide	4/10
The Tampa Tribune	3.5/5 stars

The Washington Post wrote that "the exuberant eclecticism of the late-'80s Mekons has settled into an almost classic-rock sound, and the band's attempts to vary the sound on its new Retreat From Memphis are not inspiring." Entertainment Weekly thought that the album "finds them, as usual, gleefully musing in their wry, existential style on matters ranging from amorous entanglements to global upheaval." The San Diego Union-Tribune noted that "the Mekons fall back to rocking out with a neurotic, decidedly '80s post-punk edge."

Spin deemed Retreat from Memphis a "stronger, more classic-sounding [comeback]." The Austin American-Statesman labeled it "another album of borderline brilliance from these overeducated sociopolitical gadflies, one in which the zest of the music belies the deadpan dread of the lyrics." The Chicago Tribune considered the album "one of the band's most spirited offerings of communal, life-affirming-here we go again-rock 'n' roll."

AllMusic called the album "direct, straightforward, and angry in a way the Mekons had not been for quite a while." The Rough Guide to Rock considered it "probably the weakest in the Mekons' catalogue."

== Track listing ==
No.	Title	Length
1.	"Eve Future"
2.	"Lucky Devil"
3.	"Do I Know You?"
4.	"Insignificance"
5.	"His Bad Dream"
6.	"Our Bad Dream"
7.	"The Flame That Killed John Wayne"
8.	"Ice Rink in Berlin"
9.	"Spinning Round in Flames"
10.	"Machine"
11.	"Hostile Mascot"
12.	"Chemical Wedding"
13.	"Spirals of Paranoia"
14.	"Missing You All"
15.	"Submerged"
16.	"Soldier"
17.	"Never Work"
