= So Good It Hurts =

Studio album by the Mekons
- Released: 1988
- Label: Twin/Tone

The Mekons chronology
New York (1987)	So Good It Hurts (1988)	Original Sin (1989)

So Good It Hurts is an album by the British band the Mekons, released in 1988. "Ghosts of American Astronauts" was released as a single. The band supported the album with a North American tour, as well as shows in England.

== Production ==
The band added a reggae influence to the country sound of their mid-1980s albums. Eleven musicians contributed to the recording of So Good It Hurts. As on previous albums, the band included text and footnotes, partly to inform, partly for ironic reasons. "(Sometimes I Feel Like) Fletcher Christian" is about the death of Fletcher Christian. "Heart of Stone" is a cover of the Rolling Stones song, sung by Sally Timms, who wasn't pleased with the completed track. "Vengeance" reminds listeners that the administrations of Ronald Reagan and Margaret Thatcher won't last forever. The title of "I'm Not Here (1967)" is a tribute to Bob Dylan. "Dora" was inspired in part by Sigmund Freud's case study. "Robin Hood" posits that the outlaw had homosexual relationships with his Merry Men.

== Critical reception ==
Professional ratings
Review scores
Source	Rating
AllMusic	3/5 stars
Robert Christgau	B+
The Encyclopedia of Popular Music	3/5 stars
Lincoln Journal Star	5/5 stars
MusicHound Rock: The Essential Album Guide	4/5 stars
The Philadelphia Inquirer	4/4 stars
The Rolling Stone Album Guide	2.5/5 stars
Spin Alternative Record Guide	6/10

The Philadelphia Inquirer wrote that "the music is stirring in its imaginative off-handedness, the genres are never condescended to ... and the politics are stated forcefully, without apology or fence-straddling." The Gazette determined that "Mekons have developed—almost despite themselves—into a band of shambolic but astonishing musical and lyric depth." Robert Christgau, noting the reggae influence, opined that "the skank that kicks things off is as lovable as anything they've ever done." The Edmonton Journal called the album "a sophisticated, stimulating roots record."

Trouser Press deemed the album "a more polished, pop-friendly production." The Washington Post stated that "a relaxed, island-bopping rhythm has gently infiltrated the demented country 'n' western of the Mekons." The New York Times concluded that "the music kicks along, and the band has developed a real sense of melody." The Chicago Sun-Times likened the album to "the Clash's Sandinista without the filler."

AllMusic wrote that "the deep basslines of dub and the one-drop snap of the drums merely add another filter to the overall picture of distance and ambivalence, though it's worth noting that the Mekons take to reggae like ducks to water, and this is perhaps the tightest and best-focused album the group released in the 1980s." The Rolling Stone Album Guide dismissed So Good It Hurts as "bad-imitation BeauSoleil."

== Track listing ==
No.	Title	Length
1.	"I'm Not Here (1967)"
2.	"Ghosts of American Astronauts"
3.	"The Road to Florida"
4.	"Johnny Miner"
5.	"Dora"
6.	"Poxy Lips"
7.	"(Sometimes I Feel Like) Fletcher Christian"
8.	"Fantastic Voyage"
9.	"Robin Hood"
10.	"Heart of Stone"
11.	"Maverick"
12.	"Vengeance"
