= Existentialism (album) =

Live album by the Mekons
- Released: 23 September 2016
- Recorded: July 2015
- Venues: Jalopy Theater, Red Hook, Brooklyn
- Length: 41:38
- Label: Bloodshot

The Mekons chronology
Jura (2015)	Existentialism (2016)	Deserted (2019)

Existentialism is a live album by British punk rock band the Mekons. It was released on 23 September 2016 on Bloodshot Records. It was recorded in July 2015 at the Jalopy Theater in Red Hook, Brooklyn, New York, around a single microphone and in front of a live audience. The album's release was accompanied by a limited-edition 96-page book and a documentary video, Mekonception, the latter of which documents the recording of the album.

Professional ratings
Review scores
Source	Rating
AllMusic	4/5 stars
Exclaim!	8/10
Pitchfork	7.5/10

== Track listing ==
1. Flowers of Evil, Pt. 2
2. Skintrade
3. O Money
4. Bucket
5. Fear and Beer
6. Onion
7. Traveling Alone
8. Nude Hamlet
9. 1848 Now!
10. Simone on the Beach
11. The Cell
12. Remember
