= The Mekons Rock 'n Roll =

Studio album by the Mekons
- Released: September 1989
- Recorded: Terminal Studios & Berry Street Studio London
- Genre: Alternative rock
- Length: 45:24
- Label: Blast First
- Producer: Mekons/Ian Caple

The Mekons chronology
Original Sin (1989)	The Mekons Rock 'n Roll (1989)	The Curse of the Mekons (1991)

The Mekons Rock 'n Roll is the eighth studio album by English post punk band the Mekons, released in September 1989.

== Critical reception ==
Professional ratings
Review scores
Source	Rating
AllMusic	4.5/5 stars
Chicago Tribune	3.5/4 stars
NME	7/10
Orlando Sentinel	5/5 stars
The Philadelphia Inquirer	3/4 stars
Q	4/5 stars
Rolling Stone	4/5 stars
The Rolling Stone Album Guide	4/5 stars
Spin Alternative Record Guide	10/10
The Village Voice	A

The Mekons Rock 'n Roll was well received by critics on release. It was voted the eighth best album of 1989 in The Village Voice's Pazz & Jop critics' poll. In 1991, New York Times critic Jon Pareles called it "one of the best albums of the 1980s".

Decades later, critics still remembered it fondly. Pitchfork placed The Mekons Rock 'n Roll at number 97 on its 2002 list of the 100 best albums of the 1980s. In 2007, the record was ranked at number 97 on Blender's list of "The 100 Greatest Indie-Rock Albums Ever". It was included in Tom Moon's 2008 book 1,000 Recordings to Hear Before You Die and Jimmy Guterman's The 100 Best Rock 'n' Roll Records of All Time.

== Track listing ==
All songs composed by the Mekons (as per label). The BMI database lists all songs as composed by Tom Greenhalgh and Jon Langford.

1. "Memphis, Egypt" – 3:37
2. "Club Mekon" – 3:29
3. "Only Darkness Has the Power" – 3:28
4. "Ring o' Roses" – 4:07
5. "Learning to Live on Your Own" – 4:37
6. "Cocaine Lil" – 2:51
7. "Empire of the Senseless" – 4:35
8. "Someone" – 2:44
9. "Amnesia" – 4:31
10. "I Am Crazy" – 3:28
11. "Heaven and Back" – 3:16
12. "Blow Your Tuneless Trumpet" – 3:56
13. "Echo" – 4:33
14. "When Darkness Falls" – 3:53

The American issue of this album omits "Ring o' Roses" and "Heaven and Back".
