= I Love Mekons =

Studio album by the Mekons
- Released: October 18, 1993
- Genre: Punk rock
- Length: 50:01
- Label: Quarterstick/Touch and Go

The Mekons chronology
The Curse of the Mekons (1991)	I Love Mekons (1993)	Retreat from Memphis (1994)

I Love Mekons (stylized I ♥ Mekons on the album cover; also referred to as I (Heart) Mekons) is an album by the British-American punk rock band the Mekons, released in 1993 on the Quarterstick and Touch and Go labels. It is a concept album consisting of twelve love songs.

== Background ==
Before I Love Mekons was released, the Mekons had been engaged in two years of rancorous arguments with their record label at the time, Warner Bros. Records subsidiary Loud Records. As a result, the Mekons did not release any albums for two years after the release of Curse of the Mekons in 1991. Originally, Warner Bros. had refused to release I Love Mekons because they thought it was not good enough. After the Mekons parted ways with Loud Records, the album was released in 1993 on Quarterstick, a subsidiary of Touch and Go.

== Reception ==
Professional ratings
Review scores
Source	Rating
AllMusic	4.5/5 stars
Chicago Tribune	4/4 stars
Christgau's Consumer Guide	B+
The Encyclopedia of Popular Music	3/5 stars
Orlando Sentinel	4/5 stars
Rolling Stone	3.5/5 stars

Melody Maker's Dave Jennings described I Love Mekons as "simultaneously a brilliant, exhilarating pop record and an exploration of the assumptions behind other people’s pop records." Robert Christgau gave the album a B+ grade, describing it as "love songs, laid out casually across disc and lyric sheet--a country album without a happy ending."

=== End-of-year lists ===
Greg Kot ranked I Love Mekons as his 10th favorite album of 1993, and Mark Lepage of the Montreal Gazette named it his 4th favorite album of the year.

== Track listing ==
1. "Millionaire" – 4:37
2. "Wicked Midnite" – 3:51
3. "I Don't Know" – 4:20
4. "Dear Sausage" – 3:48
5. "All I Want" – 3:49
6. "Special" – 2:30
7. "St. Valentine's Day" – 4:59
8. "I Love Apple" – 3:26
9. "Love Letter" – 4:18
10. "Honeymoon in Hell" – 5:34
11. "Too Personal" – 5:54
12. "Point of No Return" – 3:00
