= Echo City =

British sound sculpture and music project

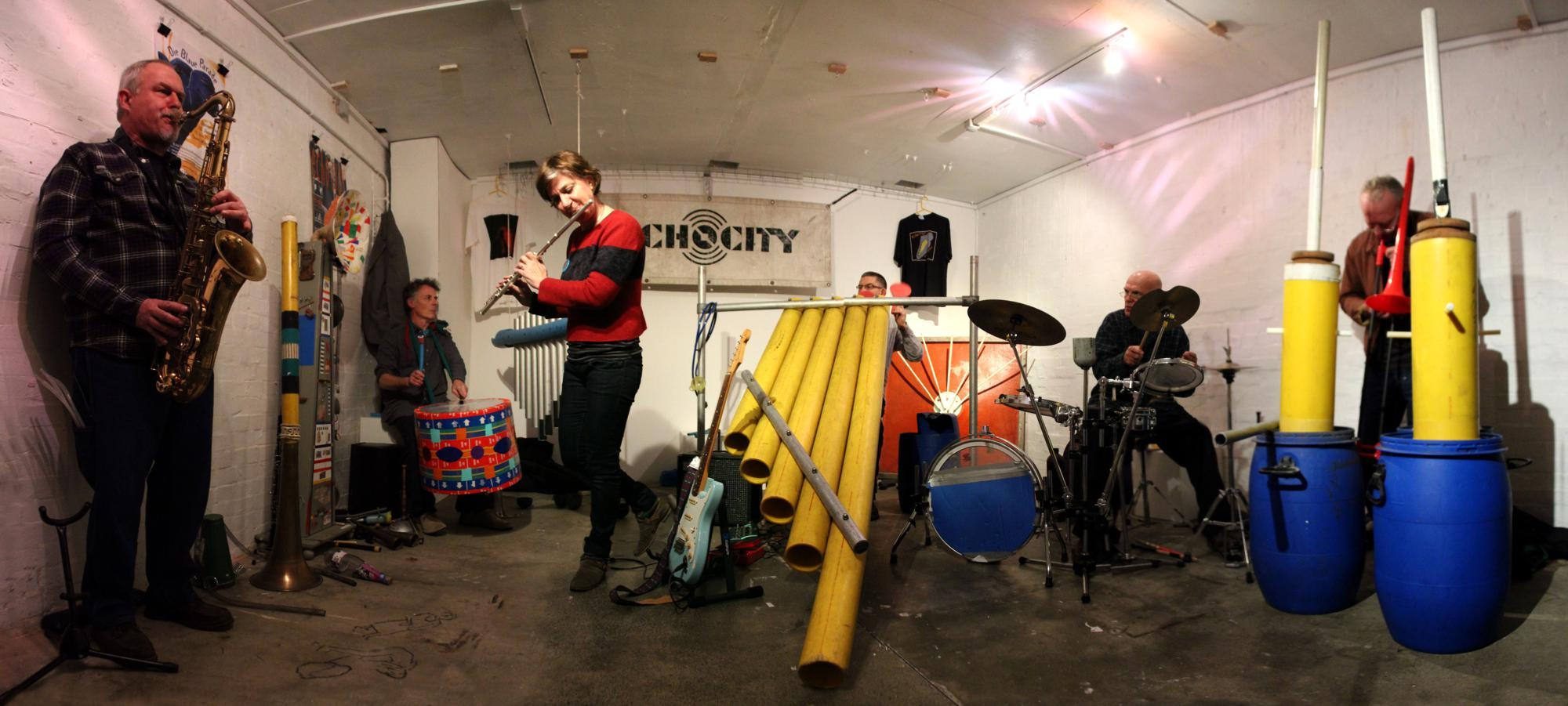
- Echo City at the 100 Years Gallery in London November 2013

Background information
- Origin: London, England
- Genres: Sound art, improvised music, experimental, community art
- Years active: 1983–present
- Labels: Gramophone, Line Records, Some Bizzare
- Members: Giles Perring; Paul Shearsmith; Guy Evans; Rob Mills; Julia Farrington
- Past members: Susie Honeyman; Giles Leaman

Echo City is a British sound sculpture and music project founded in London in 1983 by Van der Graaf Generator member Guy Evans, Giles Leaman, and Giles Perring. Its current active members are Guy Evans, Julia Farrington, Rob Mills, Giles Perring and Paul Shearsmith. Susie Honeyman of The Mekons is a former member of the group. The project builds giant musical instruments and sound sculptures called "sonic playgrounds", but Echo City has since 1985 also performed as a band.

== History ==
The project creates and builds collections of giant musical instruments and sound sculptures of its own design called "sonic playgrounds". The original concept of these structures was to involve audiences and viewers in music making themselves. The group has run music and arts projects over many years based on encouraging participation in music and sound making. The original team formed in 1983 included Guy Evans, Giles Perring, Giles Leaman and David Sawyer. The latter joined as musical instrument maker/sound sculptor for Weaver's Adventure Playground and Hayward Adventure Playground, contributing the Fibrephone design and future name of the group. Echo City has also performed as a band since 1985 and has made a number of recordings which it has released via its own Gramophone Records label, Line Music and Some Bizzare.

Echo City's first recording was the album Gramophone, named because like all the other things the group produced with the "phone" suffix [their instruments in particular], the record was something that could be played. Gramophone was a collection of recordings, some of which were originally made for a documentary film for British TV station Channel 4 called "Welcome to the Spiv Economy". Other tracks were live recordings made at the London Musician's Collective building in Chalk Farm London. The recordings featured a number of conventional instruments as well as Echo City's own devices and combined a range of musical styles including jazz inspired melodic music, field recordings and a sequence of pieces reflecting an improvised approach that was to figure heavily in the group's subsequent work. The follow-up, The Sound of Music, released on Stevo Pearce's industrial label Some Bizzare in 1992, was entirely performed using Echo City's own self made instruments and, reflecting the group's increasing involvement in participatory music making and community arts, was a more abstract and experimental recording, derived from studio based improvisations, live and field recordings and pieces recorded in music workshops. It also featured the project's first use of sampling technology.

As well as pursuing a career in the UK, Echo City also worked extensively in Europe in the 1990s, notably with the theatre group Blaumeier Atelier, based in Bremen, Germany. In 1991 the group toured in Canada playing in Montreal, Quebec City, and Ottawa. They performed in Berlin in 1997. Echo City also forged an important collaboration with an arts project for people with learning disabilities in North London, The Siren Project, and the groups collaborated on a 1997 album, Loss of the Church.

Echo City's first three albums were followed by two mini CDs/EPs, Echo City and Single2000. The first album Gramophone was re-packaged, with extra material, and released on the group's own impress, Gramophone Records, as Sonic Sport 1983-88.

A recording was made with Tchad Blake, using his binaural system, at London's Union Chapel in 1998. Although one segment from the session was released in the mini CD Single2000, the full album remained unreleased. The Tchad Blake recording was released as 'Union [The Mislaid Tapes]' as a streaming-only release in 2020.

On 17 August 2003 the group was profiled on the BBC Radio 3 programme "Mixing It".

In 2010, Echo City collaborated with members of the Sun Ra Arkestra at a studio on the Scottish island Jura to make a series of recordings. This has resulted in the mini CD Eruption Day.

In November 2013, Echo City installed a selection of its instruments for an exhibition and residency at the Hundred Years Gallery in Hackney, London. The residency included a number of performances, each of which saw the band's current line-up joined by former members Susie Honeyman and Giles Leaman. The exhibition drew on the 30-year history of the project to offer an impressionistic retrospective of Echo City and its work.

In 2018, Giles Perring built an installation of Echo City instruments with members of the community of the Isle of Jura in Scotland. The instruments were created as a permanent fixture at the Corran Sands beach on the island.

== Collaborators and guest performers ==
Over the course of its history, Echo City has involved and collaborated with a number of other musicians and artists. These relationships have, in cases, spread over a number of years. This list includes Peter Hammill (of Van der Graaf Generator), Nick Cash (of Fad Gadget & Unmen), Michael Ray (of Kool & The Gang and Sun Ra Arkestra), Dave Davis (of Sun Ra Arkestra), Mike Barnes, Jozefa Rogocki, Sophie Fishwick, Karen Boswall, Richard Bealing, Bettina Schmid, Patou Soult, Mat Fraser, David Jackson (of Van der Graaf Generator), Chris Silvey and Alan Wilkinson.

== Discography ==
- Gramophone (1986, Line Records)
- The Sound of Music (1992, Some Bizzare)
- Sonic Sport 1983-88 (1995, Gramophone Records; is a reissue of Gramophone with extra tracks)
- Loss of the Church (1997, Gramophone Records; with Siren Project)
- Echo City (1999, Gramophone Records)
- Single2000 (2000, Gramophone Records)
- Eruption Day (2010, with Michael Ray and Dave Davis)
- Union (The Mislaid Tapes) (2020, XA Music) Echo City with Tchad Blake
