= Pussy, King of the Pirates =

Studio album by the Mekons and Kathy Acker
- Released: 1996
- Recorded: 1995
- Genre: Rock, spoken word
- Label: Quarterstick

The Mekons chronology
Retreat from Memphis (1994)	Pussy, King of the Pirates (1996)	Mekons United (1996)

Pussy, King of the Pirates is an album by the British band the Mekons and the American writer Kathy Acker, released in 1996. It accompanied the publication of Acker's 1996 novel of the same name. Acker provided spoken word sections between songs by the Mekons. The band and Acker supported Pussy, King of the Pirates with live dates in London, Seattle, and Chicago.

== Production ==
The Mekons and Acker had first met at the Kennel Club, in San Francisco, and reconnected at Miss Pearl's Jam House. Pussy, King of the Pirates was recorded in the summer of 1995. The album and novel are about a group of female pirates searching for a lost treasure; the story was influenced in part by Treasure Island, the work of Antonin Artaud, and Story of O. The cover art was created by S. Clay Wilson. "Antigone Speaks About Herself" incorporates elements of disco.

== Critical reception ==
Professional ratings
Review scores
Source	Rating
All Music Guide to Rock	2/5 stars
The Encyclopedia of Popular Music	3/5 stars
The Great Indie Discography	6/10
MusicHound Rock: The Essential Album Guide	3/5 stars
Rolling Stone	3/5 stars
(The New) Rolling Stone Album Guide	1/5 stars

The Chicago Tribune opined that Acker's "lyrics and between-songs text lead the listener on an epic swashbuckling journey into the female psyche." Rolling Stone said that "the Mekons contribute a typical hodgepodge of music that includes Eastern syncopations, reggae, Eurodisco, misty balladry and thrash metal... But where Acker and the Mekons mesh most closely is on the subjects of identity and transcendence." LA Weekly noted that "these are songs that seek, nosing through the rubble of discarded pop styles in search of a rock & roll form that supports femininity ... instead of commodifying it." The Daily Telegraph called the album "a pirate fantasia with musical allusions to everything from contemporary drum 'n' bass to traditional sea shanties." (The New) Rolling Stone Album Guide dismissed it as "an unlistenable performance-art piece".

== Track listing ==
No.	Title	Length
1.	"'My Name Is O'"
2.	"Ange's Song as She Crawled Through London"
3.	"'I Want to Tell You About Myself'"
4.	"Song of the Dogs"
5.	"'We're Just Outside London'"
6.	"Ostracism's Song to Pussycat"
7.	"'Antigone, You See Her'"
8.	"Antigone Speaks About Herself"
9.	"'Now Let Me Tell You...'"
10.	"My Song at Night"
11.	"'Since Ange and Me Are Innocent'"
12.	"Into the Strange"
13.	"Captured by Pirates"
14.	"A Prayer for All Sailors"
15.	"O"
