= Jura (album) =

Studio album by the Mekons & Robbie Fulks
- Released: November 27, 2015
- Recorded: August 2014
- Length: 34:22
- Label: Bloodshot

The Melons chronology
Ancient & Modern 1911–2011 (2011)	Jura (2015)	Existentialism (2016)

Professional ratings
Aggregate scores
Source	Rating
Metacritic	80/100
Review scores
Source	Rating
AllMusic	4/5 stars
American Songwriter	3.5/5 stars
Exclaim!	8/10
Expert Witness	A−
Paste	7.0/10
PopMatters	8/10

Jura is a collaborative album by the Mekons and Robbie Fulks. It was released on November 27, 2015, originally for Record Store Day, on Bloodshot Records. The original release was a limited-edition vinyl-only release that sold out quickly; since then, the album has only been available digitally. It was recorded on the Scottish island of Jura in August 2014.

== Track listing ==
1. "A Fearful Moment"
2. "Refill"
3. "An Incident off St. Kitt's"
4. "Shine on Silver Seas"
5. "Land Ahoy!"
6. "Beaten and Broken"
7. "Getting On with It"
8. "I Am Come Home"
9. "The Last Fish in the Sea"
10. "I Say, Hang Him!"
11. "Go from My Window"
