= OOOH! (Out of Our Heads) =

Studio album by the Mekons
- Released: 2002
- Label: Quarterstick

The Mekons chronology
Journey to the End of the Night (2000)	OOOH! (Out of Our Heads) (2002)	Punk Rock (2004)

OOOH! (Out of Our Heads) is an album by the British band the Mekons, released in 2002. It was inspired by a collaborative visual arts project sponsored by East Street Arts. The album marked the band's 25th anniversary. "Thee Olde Trip to Jerusalem" was released as a single. The Mekons supported the album with a North American tour.

== Production ==
Although often labeled a 9/11 album, OOOH!'s songs were written by the spring of 2001 and recorded in Chicago. Frontman Jon Langford thought that many of the songs were about the constructive features of religion. Langford and Tom Greenhalgh were the only original bandmembers to participate in the recording sessions. The album cover art was based on the deuterocanonical Book of Judith. "Lone Pilgrim" is a version of the folk standard. "Thee Olde Trip to Jerusalem" mentions William Morris, Tony Benn, William Blake, and the Diggers, among others. Edith Frost and Kelly Hogan provided backing vocals on "Take His Name in Vain", which was inspired by gospel music. "Stonehead" is about regicide.

== Critical reception ==
Professional ratings
Review scores
Source	Rating
AllMusic	3/5 stars
Robert Christgau	A
The Encyclopedia of Popular Music	3/5 stars
The News & Observer	3.5/4 stars
Pitchfork	8.0/10

Robert Christgau wrote that "their best album in a decade doesn't exactly come up and give you a kiss... It's slow, sour, dark, grim--obsessed with treachery, conflagration, and death"; he listed the album as the best of 2002 in his ballot for the Pazz & Jop poll. Pitchfork called the album "a return to textbook Mekons—from gracefully shambling country to deep-beating tribal rhythms, by way of good, clean rock 'n roll." The Tallahassee Democrat deemed it "yet another exuberant, drunken foray into the briar patch of country music." Salon opined that, "instead of plundering trends, like well-preserved chameleons David Bowie and Madonna, they stay relevant by setting songs in the actual world."

The Washington Post determined that OOOH! "consolidates the band's best-loved styles into a boisterous sort of Brit-folk/country-rock," writing that "most of these downbeat yet defiant songs could have been inspired by either the state of the world or the condition of singer-guitarists Jon Langford and Tom Greenhalgh's souls." The Boston Globe considered the Mekons "rock 'n' roll's most enduring band-as-family," labeling the album "country and rock, agitprop and comfort food." The Independent said that "Langford's vocals are equal parts ragged gospel, drunk country and spiteful punk."

The Chicago Tribune, The Globe and Mail, and the Pittsburgh Post-Gazette were among the many periodicals that included OOOH! with the best albums of 2002.

AllMusic wrote that "this is a Mekons recording that pulls out all the stops and brings their deeply rooted psychobilly country base to the fore while engaging their punk roots with abandon."

== Track listing ==
No.	Title	Length
1.	"Thee Olde Trip to Jerusalem"
2.	"Dancing in the Head"
3.	"This Way Through the Fire"
4.	"Hate Is the New Love"
5.	"Take His Name in Vain"
6.	"Only You and Your Ghost Will Know"
7.	"Lone Pilgrim"
8.	"Winter"
9.	"One X One"
10.	"Bob Hope & Charity"
11.	"Stonehead"
