= Wee Hairy Beasties =

Children's music group

Wee Hairy Beasties was a children's music group composed of Jon Langford, Sally Timms, Kelly Hogan, and Devil in a Woodpile. They played their first gig together at the Brookfield Zoo near Chicago, and released an album through Bloodshot Records in 2006 and another in 2008 on Wee Beatz Records.

== Discography ==
Animal Crackers

Studio album by Wee Hairy Beasties
- Released: 24 October 2006
- Genre: Children
- Label: Bloodshot Records

Professional ratings
Review scores
Source	Rating
Allmusic	3.5/5 stars
Wisconsin State Journal	none

=== Animal Crackers ===
1. "Wee Hairy Beasties"
2. "Flies on My Taters"
3. "Animal Crackers"
4. "Ragtime Duck"
5. "Housefly Blues"
6. "A Newt Called Tiny"
7. "I'm an A.N.T."
8. "Road Safety Song"
9. "Cuttlefish Bone"
10. "Glow Worm"
11. "Buzz Buzz Buzz"
12. "Cyril the Karaoke Squirrel"
13. "Toenail Moon"
14. "Lightnin' the Turtle"
15. "Wee Hairy Beasties (Reprise)"

Holidays Gone Crazy

Studio album by Wee Hairy Beasties
- Released: 2008
- Genre: Children
- Label: Wee Beatz

Professional ratings
Review scores
Source	Rating
Robert Christgau	(A−)

=== Holidays Gone Crazy ===
1. Belly Button Blues
2. Here Comes My Shadow
3. Yellow Snow P.S.A.
4. The Tail of the Night Before...
5. Dinosaur Christmas
6. Pumpkinhead
7. Wee Scary Beasties
8. Holidays Gone Crazy
9. Eat Your Greens P.S.A.
10. Bury Me in the Sand
11. The Lonely Vampire
12. Tummy Trouble P.S.A.
13. Jug Rag
