= David Cohen (art critic) =

American art critic and historian

David Cohen is an American art critic, art historian, curator and publisher. He is the editor of artcritical.com, which he founded in 2001. Cohen is also the organizer and moderator of The Review Panel, an ongoing public discussion forum that he launched in 2004, and has been hosted by the National Academy Museum and School and the Pennsylvania Academy of the Fine Arts. He teaches at Pratt Institute, the Pennsylvania Academy of the Fine Arts, the Fashion Institute of Technology and other institutions.

== Career ==
In the decade before he moved to New York City, Cohen pursued a career as a fine arts journalist in his native London, England, where he wrote for such publications as Art Monthly, Burlington Magazine and Modern Painters, as well as for newspapers, including The Independent and the New Statesman. In 2000, he immigrated to the United States, and became a citizen there in 2008.

From 2003 to 2008, Cohen served as art critic and contributing editor at The New York Sun. From 2001 to 2010, Cohen worked at the New York Studio School as its Gallery Director, and organized more than forty exhibitions of artists including Thomas Nozkowski, Rackstraw Downes, John Newman, Pat Steir, Dorothea Rockburne, Merlin James and William Tucker. At the school he featured regularly as a speaker in the public Evening Lecture program, conducting interviews with leading art critics and art historians in a series titled “The Craft of Criticism” where guests included Peter Schjeldahl, Michael Kimmelman, Michael Fried, Rosalind E. Krauss, Svetlana Alpers, Linda Nochlin, Arthur Danto, Mark Stevens, Roberta Smith, Jerry Saltz and Robert Storr. Many of the interviewees in this series later appeared on The Review Panel.

== Publications ==
- Henry Moore in the Bagatelle Gardens, Paris. London: Lund Humphries; New York: Overlook Press, 1993.
- Jock McFadyen: A Book about a Painter. London: Lund Humphries, 2001.
- Alex Katz Collages: A Catalogue Raisonné, Waterville, Maine: Colby College Museum of Art, 2005.
- Serban Savu (co-author Rozalinda Borcila). Ostfildern, Germany: Hatje Cantz, 2011.
