= The Edge of the World (The Mekons album) =

Studio album by the Mekons
- Released: 1986
- Label: Sin
- Producer: The Mekons

The Mekons chronology
Crime and Punishment (1986)	The Edge of the World (1986)	Slightly South of the Border (1986)

The Edge of the World is an album by the British band the Mekons, released in 1986. The album is dedicated to Richard Manuel. The band supported the album with a North American tour.

== Production ==
The album was produced by the Mekons. Sally Timms and Rico Bell joined the band prior to the recording sessions. It contains cover versions of Don Gibson's "Sweet Dreams" and Hank Williams's "Alone & Forsaken", which borrows music from the Velvet Underground's "The Black Angel's Death Song". "King Arthur" was inspired by the 1984 UK miners' strike. In "Big Zombie", the narrator turns to cat food, rather than alcohol, due to his alienation.

== Critical reception ==
Professional ratings
Review scores
Source	Rating
AllMusic	4/5 stars
Robert Christgau	A−
The Encyclopedia of Popular Music	3/5 stars
MusicHound Rock: The Essential Album Guide	4.5/5 stars
The Rolling Stone Album Guide	3.5/5 stars
Spin Alternative Record Guide	9/10

Trouser Press wrote that Sally Timms's "crystalline tone [provides] just the right touch of unflinching world-weariness between [Tom] Greenhalgh's going-down-slow croon and [Jon] Langford's beery bawl." Greil Marcus, in Artforum, noted that "every song pointedly dramatizes a listener; every song is an attempt to find someone to talk to." The Gazette listed the album as the eighth best of 1986.

AllMusic called the album "one of the Mekons' finest efforts," writing that "Hello Cruel World" "is a grinding post-punk downer that slowly accelerates into a desperate, hoarse cry with no noticeable country or folk elements."

== Track listing ==
No.	Title	Length
1.	"Hello Cruel World"
2.	"Bastard"
3.	"Oblivion"
4.	"King Arthur"
5.	"Ugly Band"
6.	"Shanty"
7.	"Garage d'Or"
8.	"Big Zombie"
9.	"Sweet Dreams"
10.	"Dream Dream Dream"
11.	"Slightly South of the Border"
12.	"Alone & Forsaken"
13.	"The Letter"
