= The Quality of Mercy Is Not Strnen =

Studio album by the Mekons
- Released: 1979
- Studio: The Manor, Shipton-on-Cherwell, Oxfordshire
- Genre: Post-punk
- Label: Virgin
- Producer: Bob Last

The Mekons chronology
The Quality of Mercy Is Not Strnen (1979)	The Mekons (1980)

The Quality of Mercy Is Not Strnen is the debut album by the Mekons, released in 1979.

== Music and lyrics ==
The music of the Mekons' debut is aggressively primitive. Most of the songs are built on one or two chords, and each is "propelled by Jon Langford's herky-jerky, somewhat arrhythmic drumming".

Many lyrics are political and, like those of their friends in Gang of Four, far left, but with "a more literary approach".

== Album name ==
The album's name and cover are an allusion to the infinite monkey theorem, that states that a monkey hitting random keys on a typewriter will eventually type a text such as the works of William Shakespeare. The title almost, but not quite, reproduces the line "The quality of mercy is not strain'd," spoken by Portia in The Merchant of Venice.

== Reception ==
Professional ratings
Review scores
Source	Rating
AllMusic	3/5 stars

Trouser Press wrote that the album "suffers from the screamed vocals, which obscure both the music and the left-wing lyrics: minimalism is one thing, but rank amateurism another."

== Track listing ==
All tracks composed by the Mekons
Side A

1. "Like Spoons No More" (2:05)
2. "Join Us in the Countryside" (2:05)
3. "Rosanne" (2:34)
4. "Trevira Trousers" (4:05)
5. "After 6" (4:53)
6. "What Are We Going to Do Tonight" (1:48)

Side B

1. "What" (2:08)
2. "Watch the Film" (3:18)
3. "Beetroot" (4:12)
4. "I Saw You Dance" (2:17)
5. "Lonely and Wet" (5:03)
6. "Dan Dare" (2:32)

A CD reissue in 1990 included six more tracks, drawn from singles released in 1979 and 1980:

1. "Teeth" (3:27)
2. "Guardian" (4:15)
3. "Kill" (4:40)
4. "Stay Cool" (4:02)
5. "Work All Week" (3:16)
6. "Unknown Wrecks" (3:14)
