= Lu Edmonds =

British musician

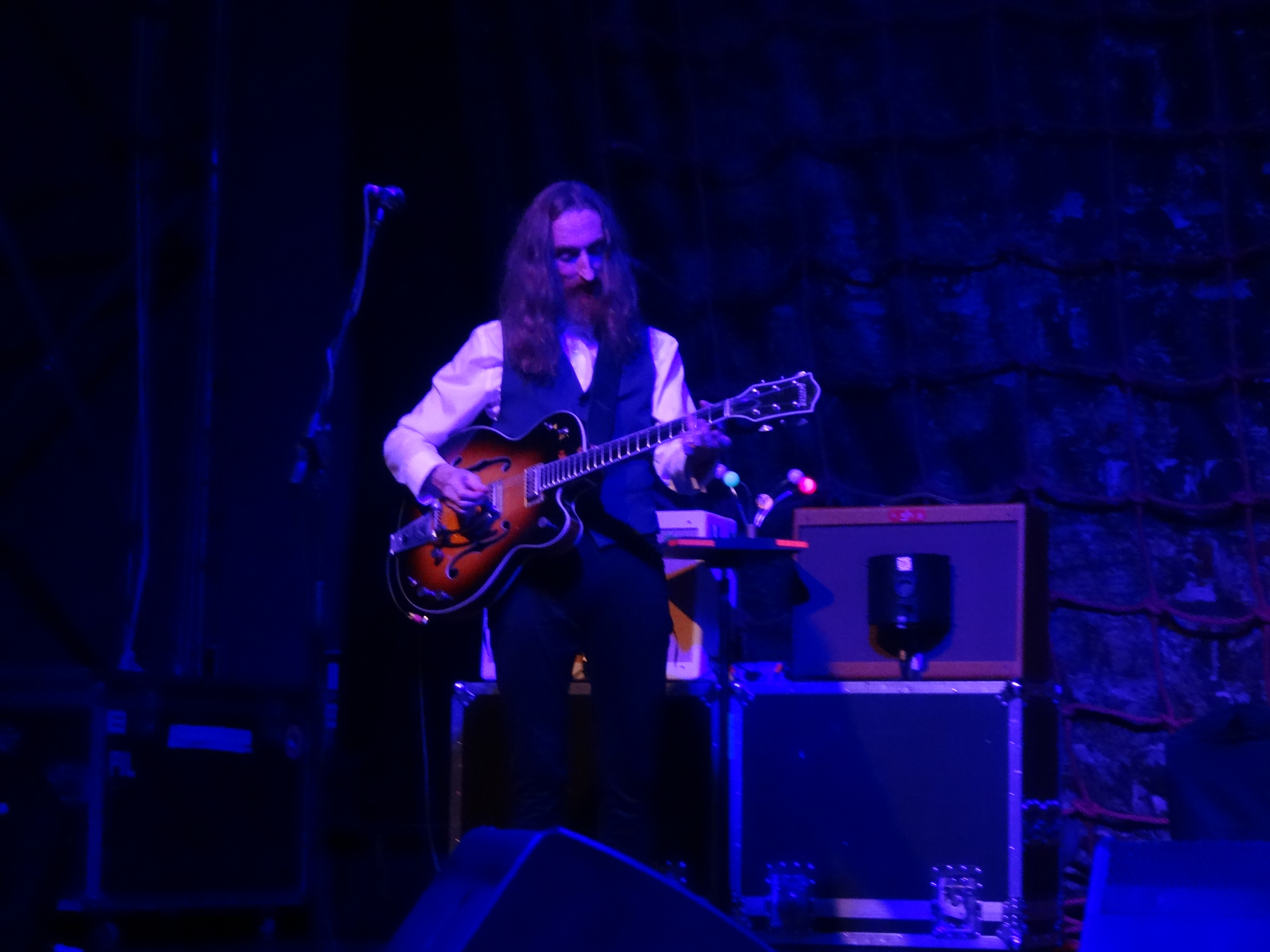
- Edmonds performing with Public Image Ltd in 2013

Background information
- Born: Robert David Edmonds; 9 September 1957 (age 68)
- Origin: Welwyn Garden City, Hertfordshire, England
- Genres: Punk rock; new wave; alternative rock; folk rock; post punk; world music
- Occupation: Musician
- Instruments: Guitar; keyboards; bouzouki; bass; saz; cümbüş; oud; vocals
- Member of: Public Image Ltd.; The Mekons
- Formerly of: The Damned; Shriekback; The Spizzles

Robert David "Lu" Edmonds (born 9 September 1957) is an English rock and folk musician. He is currently, as of 2018, a vocalist and saz and cümbüş player in the Mekons and the guitarist for Public Image Ltd. Edmonds reportedly plays electric guitar, bass guitar, keyboards, bouzouki, saz, cümbüs, oud, and drums, among other instruments.

== Personal life ==
Growing up abroad in Poland, South America, Russia and Cyprus, Edmonds was educated in local schools and at Ampleforth College. As of 2024, he resided in London.

== Rock music ==
Edmonds is currently, as of 2018, a vocalist and saz and cümbüş player in the Mekons, and also the lead guitarist for Public Image Limited.

=== The Damned 1977–1978 ===
Edmonds first came to prominence as a member of the Damned, playing guitar on their second album, 1977's Music For Pleasure. It was the rest of the band that nicknamed him "Lu"—short for "Lunatic". Billed simply as "Lu" while with the Damned, subsequent bands billed him as Lu Edmonds (or occasionally "Lu Knee").

=== The Edge 1978–1980 ===
Edmonds was the guitarist/vocalist in new-wave band the Edge. This band also featured drummer Jon Moss, (whom Edmonds met in the Damned, and who went on to become the drummer in Culture Club), bassist Glyn Havard (who played in the prog-rock band Jade Warrior) and keyboardist Gavin Povey (who later played with UK virtuoso guitarist Albert Lee in Albert Lee & Hogan's Heroes). They released one album, Square 1 and three singles.

=== Spizzles 1980–1981 ===
Lu Edmonds joined this Spizzenergi incarnation during their commercially most successful phase, playing guitar and piano on two singles and their album Spikey Dream Flowers. Besides lead singer Kenneth Spiers, the band had Clive Parker on drums and Jim Solar on bass.

=== Other ===
He has played in Public Image Ltd, the Mekons, Shriekback, as a Bloke in Billy Bragg & the Blokes as well as on tracks by the Waterboys and Kirsty MacColl. He also co-wrote songs with MacColl for her first album and played lead guitar on her first single "They Don't Know" (and also on the cover of that song by comedian Tracey Ullman).

== Eclectic music ==
In the early years (1982–?) of the band 3 Mustaphas 3, "world music" pioneers, Edmonds played various instruments under the pseudonym Uncle Patrel Mustapha Bin Mustapha. Then Edmonds and Ben Mandelson, both former "Mustaphas", created two trios: in 2009 Blue Blokes 3 with Ian A. Anderson, releasing the album Stubble (Fledg'ling Records); and in 2010 Les Triaboliques with fellow picker Justin Adams, releasing the album Rivermudtwilight. In 2010, Edmonds appeared on Poets and Lighthouses, the latest album by Albert Kuvezin of the Tuvan ethnic-rock fusion group Yat Kha. In 2019, Edmonds and Mark Roberts, as Blabbermouth, released the album Hörspiel ("Hörspiel" being German for "radio drama" or "audio play"), with several guest musicians, including Rico Bell and Sally Timms of the Mekons, and Albert Kuvezin.

c. 2000–2015, Edmonds spent several years helping local musicians in Western Siberia and Central Asia to promote their work and to set up recording facilities.
