= Ancient & Modern 1911–2011 =

Studio album by the Mekons
- Released: 27 September 2011
- Genre: Folk rock
- Length: 45:33
- Label: Bloodshot
- Producers: Walter Jaquiss; the Mekons

The Mekons chronology
Natural (2007)	Ancient & Modern 1911–2011 (2011)	Jura (2015)

Ancient & Modern 1911–2011 is an album by the band the Mekons, released on 27 September 2011. They claimed that it was their 26th album. A film, Revenge of the Mekons, released in 2014, chronicled the recording of the album and subsequent British tour, with the track "Afar & Forlorn" documented from its composition to its recording to its live rendering.

== Production ==
Ancient & Modern 1911–2011 was produced by Walter Jaquiss and the band. Jon Langford considered the album to be about the development of the "horrors" of the 20th century. Some of its songs describe life in the United Kingdom before and during World War I. "Geeshie" uses the melody of Geeshie Wiley's "Last Kind Words". The title track is sung as a sea shanty.

== Critical reception ==
Professional ratings
Review scores
Source	Rating
Robert Christgau	A−
Pitchfork	6.6/10
Record Collector	4/5 stars
Rolling Stone	3.5/5 stars
Spin	7/10 stars

The San Antonio Express-News called the album "a folk-rock There's a Riot Going On." The Washington Post labeled it "a thorny mix of antiquey folk, squalling punk and Weimar-era cabaret". The New York Post praised the "happily Gothic pre-jazz vibe" of "Geeshie". Rolling Stone considered Ancient & Modern 1911–2011 "meaty and grizzled folk rock", writing that "the title track is almost a play on nostalgia's seductive power".

The Village Voice deemed it "another masterful bricolage of styles that plays on British historical resonances from across the last century." The Chicago Tribune noted the "sense of anarchic despair and artistic wonder." Pitchfork stated that the Mekons still sound "prickly, jovial, boozy, resistant to the bourgeois pleasures of rhyme and tune but sometimes seduced by them anyway." Robert Christgau admired "the ingrained musicality of a bunch of jokers who've evolved into a sonic organism even though they never see each other anymore".

== Track listing ==
No.	Title	Length
1.	"Warm Summer Sun"	4:28
2.	"Space in Your Face"	3:30
3.	"Geeshie"	3:10
4.	"I Fall Asleep"	5:04
5.	"Calling All Demons"	3:27
6.	"Ugly Bethesda"	3:56
7.	"Ancient & Modern"	6:52
8.	"Afar & Forlorn"	3:30
9.	"Honey Bear"	3:21
10.	"The Devil at Rest"	3:30
11.	"Arthur's Angel"	4:45
Total length:		45:33
