= The Mekons =

British-American rock band

mekons
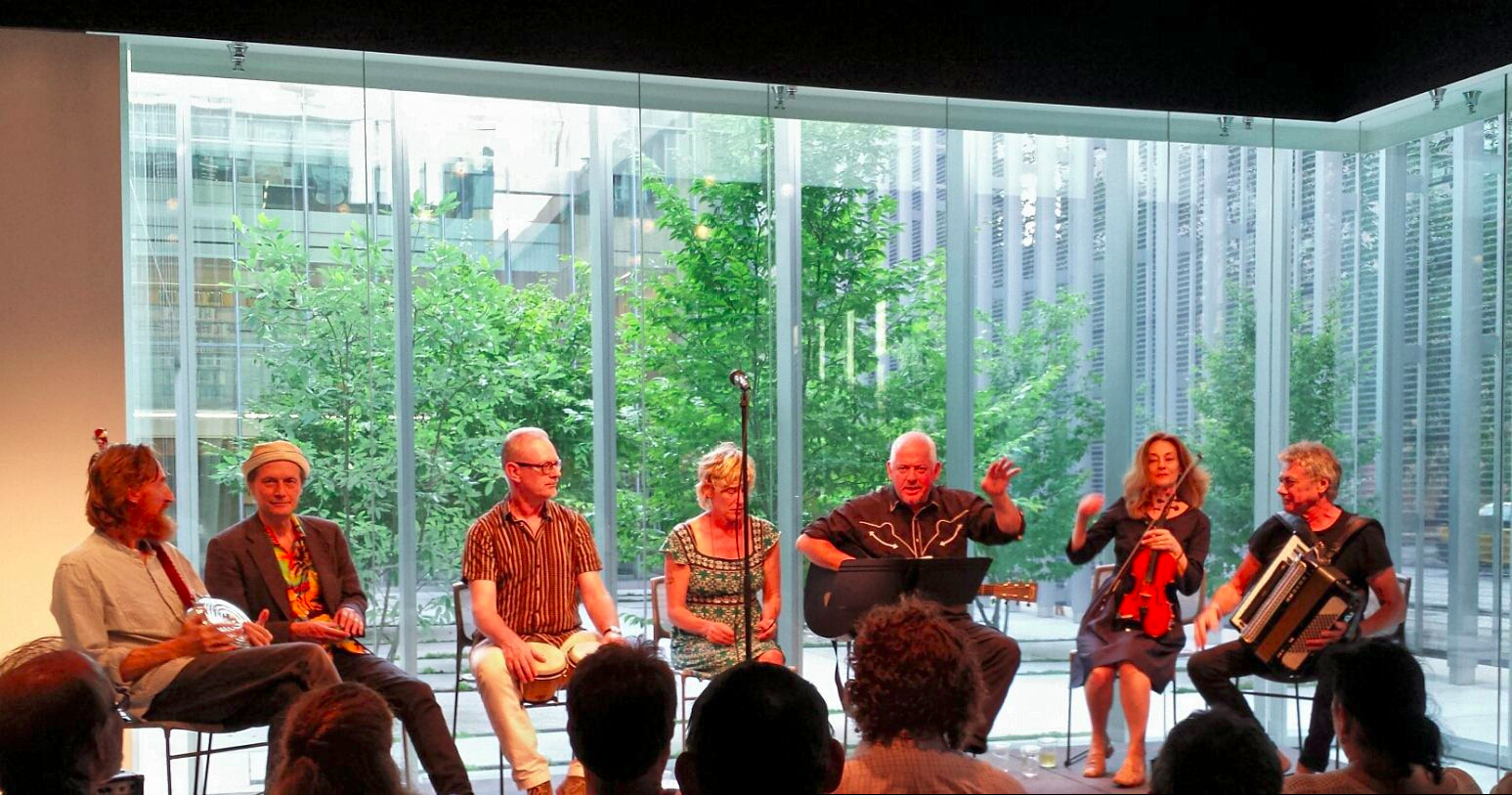
- mekons 13 July 2015 left to right: Lu Edmonds, Tom Greenhalgh, Steve Goulding, Sally Timms, Jon Langford, Susie Honeyman, Rico Bell (not pictured: Dave Trumfio)

Background information
- Origin: Leeds, West Yorkshire, England
- Genres: Post-punk; alternative country; cowpunk; alternative rock
- Years active: 1976–present
- Labels: Fast Product; Virgin; Blast First; A&M; Quarterstick Records; Scout Releases; Bloodshot
- Spinoffs: The Waco Brothers; The Mekons 77; Wee Hairy Beasties; The Three Johns
- Members: Jon Langford; Tom Greenhalgh; Sally Timms; Steve Goulding; Susie Honeyman; Rico Bell (aka Eric Bellis); Lu Edmonds; Dave Trumfio
- Past members: Sarah Corina; Andy Corrigan; Kevin Lycett; Mark "Chalkie" White; Ros Allen; Dick Taylor; John Gill; Mary Jenner; Robert Worby

The Mekons 77
- Origin: Leeds, West Yorkshire, England, United Kingdom
- Years active: 2017–present
- Members: Jon Langford; Tom Greenhalgh; Andy Corrigan; Kevin Lycett; Mark “Chalkie” White; Ros Allen

The Mekons (stylized as mekons) are a British post-punk band formed in 1976 as an art collective. They are one of the longest-running and most prolific of the first-wave British punk rock bands. Although the Mekons' lineup has changed from time to time over the years, the core line-up includes Jon Langford (vocals, guitar), Sally Timms (vocals), Tom Greenhalgh (vocals, guitar) and Susie Honeyman (violin).

The band's style has evolved over time to incorporate aspects of country music, folk music, alternative rock and occasional experiments with dub. They are well known for their exuberant live performances.

== History ==
The band was formed in 1976 by a group of University of Leeds art students: Jon Langford, Kevin Lycett, Mark White, Ros Allen, Andy Corrigan and Tom Greenhalgh — Gang of Four and Delta 5 formed from the same group of students. They took the band's name from the Mekon, an evil, super-intelligent Venusian featured in the British 1950s–1960s comic Dan Dare (printed in the Eagle). mekons were described as a more chaotic version of Gang of Four; Lycett stated the band operated on the principle that "anybody could do it ... anybody could get up and join in and instruments could be swapped around; that there'd be no distance between the audience and the band."

By their second show, supporting the Rezillos at the F Club, they were approached with a record deal by Bob Last of Fast Product, and became the first band signed to the label. Their first single was "Never Been in a Riot", a satirical take on the Clash's "White Riot". The release was made Single of the Week in NME. Their second single, "Where Were You?" was released by the end of 1978, and sold out of its 27,500 copies. At this time, Last convinced the band to sign to a larger label—Virgin. The Mekons' popularity peaked as they played on the same bill as other "new music" groups like Gang of Four, the Fall, the Human League, and Stiff Little Fingers.

For several years the band played noisy, bare-bones post-punk, releasing singles on a number of labels. Their first album, The Quality of Mercy Is Not Strnen, was recorded using Gang of Four's instruments, and due to an error by the Virgin Records’ art department, featured pictures of Gang of Four on the back cover. After 1982's The Mekons Story, a compilation of old recordings, the band ceased activity for a while, with Langford forming The Three Johns.

By the mid-1980s (revitalised by the 1984 coal miners' strike) the band had returned as an active group. The band was now augmented by vocalist Sally Timms, violinist Susie Honeyman, ex-Damned member Lu Edmonds, accordionist/vocalist Rico Bell (a.k.a. Eric Bellis), and former The Rumour drummer Steve Goulding. They began to experiment with musical styles derived from traditional English folk (tentatively explored on the English Dancing Master EP prior to the hiatus), and American country music. Fear and Whiskey (1985), The Edge of the World (1986) and The Mekons Honky Tonkin' (1987) exemplified the band's new sound, which built on the innovations of Gram Parsons and blended punk ethos and left wing politics with the minimalist country of Hank Williams. Subsequent albums, such as The Mekons Rock 'n Roll, continued to experiment with diverse instrumentation (notably the fiddle, accordion, slide guitar, and saz).

The Mekons Rock 'n Roll, released by A&M Records in 1989, was the band's only album put out by a major label. It was not a commercial success, reportedly selling only around 23,000 albums in the U.S., but was met with critical acclaim. It was named eighth of the top 10 albums of 1989 in the Village Voice's Pazz & Jop critics poll. In 1991, New York Times critic Jon Pareles called it "one of the best albums of the 1980s."

Around the time the Mekons began to gain critical appraisal, their relationship with A&M Records deteriorated, and they were dropped for being unable to fulfill commercial expectations. However, the band continued to record at a prolific rate, releasing such notable albums as 1991's Curse of the Mekons, 2000's Journey to the End of the Night, and 2002's OOOH! (Out of Our Heads) Natural moved the band to a more folk-flavoured sound. In April 2009 mekons returned to the studio to complete a new collection of songs, released in 2011 as Ancient & Modern 1911–2011 on Bloodshot Records, and, in a September 2010 interview, Jon Langford revealed that the band would tour the United States in 2011.

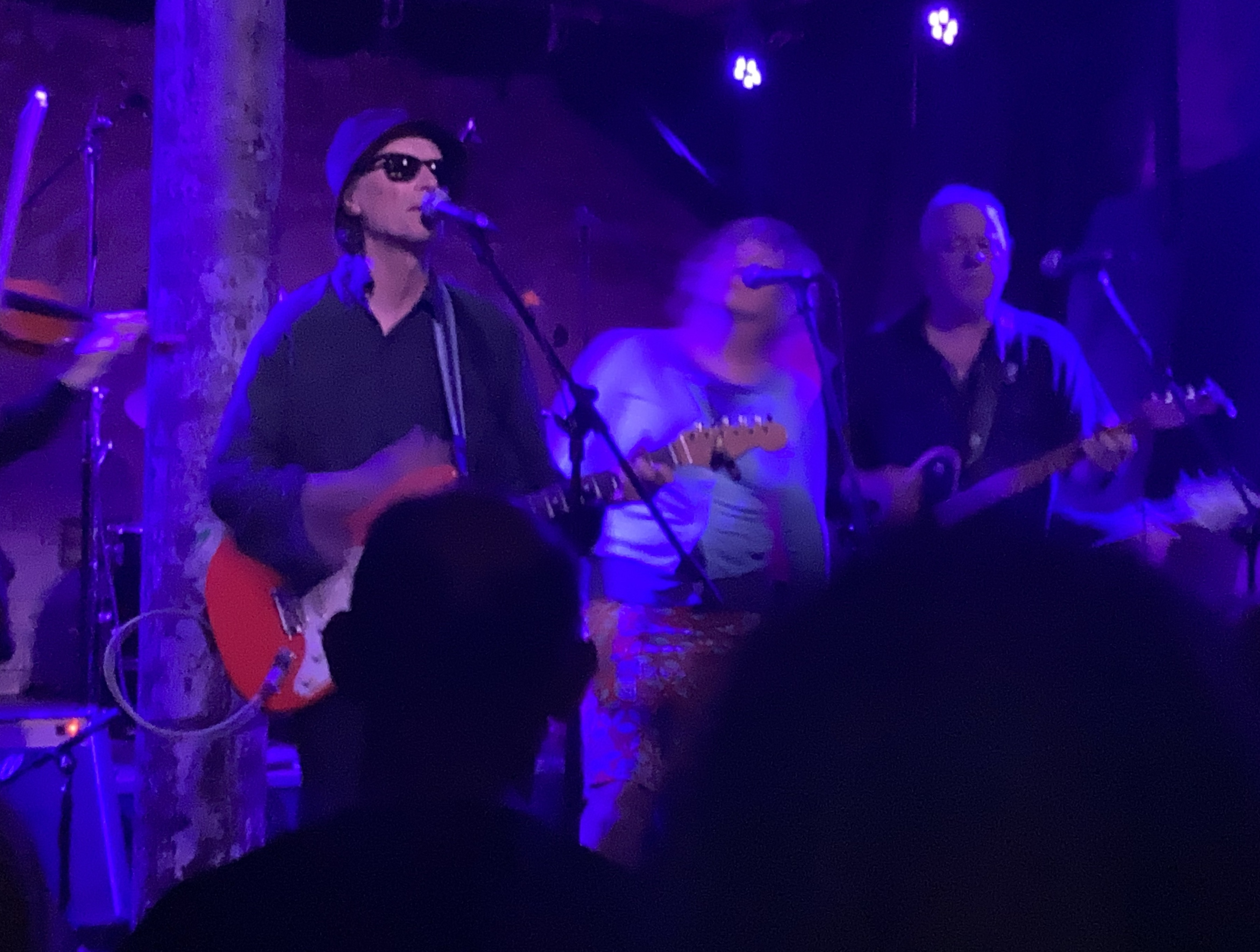
Greenhalgh, Timms and Langford performing live in 2025

In a February 2011 interview, Langford discussed the music documentary about the band, Revenge of the Mekons, directed by Joe Angio. The film premiered in 2013 at the DOC NYC festival with members of the band in attendance.

The band has toured and recorded with a, for the most part, unaltered lineup (Langford, Greenhalgh, Timms, Goulding, Bell, Edmonds, Honeyman, and bassist Sarah Corina) throughout the 1990s and early 21st century, and has a devoted following. Sarah Corina left in 2015, and Dave Trumfio, of Chicago and Southern California, replaced Corina on bass. By the 21st century, Sally Timms had also become the band's de facto tour manager.

The band celebrated their 40th anniversary with the "Mekonville" festival near Ipswich, England, with both the current 2017 line-up and the re-united original 1977 lineup performing. At that festival, Mekonville, a 12-inch "split single" was released, with one new song from each of the two line-ups. The 2017 line-up performed several concerts in the UK and elsewhere in Europe in July and August of that year. Jon Langford and Tom Greenhalgh were the only members common to both line-ups.

Their 2019 album Deserted was recorded in a studio near to Joshua Tree National Park. In an interview, they described how "the rugged landscape informed the highly diverse collection of songs they wrote". Their 2021 album Exquisite was remotely recorded due to the COVID-19 pandemic. The Mekons released the album Horror in April 2025, having recorded it in 2022 in a studio in Valencia, Spain, without crediting any individual musicians. Lu Edmonds did not perform at any of the Mekons 2025 concerts, and by 2026 it was clear that Edmonds had left the band, apparently because of other commitments. (Edmonds had for some years been the lead guitarist of Public Image Limited, which was touring frequently as of 2025 and 2026.)

== Legacy ==
Alongside Bob Dylan, Neil Young and Crazy Horse, and The Clash, mekons are the only other band or musician to top Robert Christgau's Dean's Lists twice (begun in 1971).

According to David Cantwell, mekons are also one of Greil Marcus's favourite bands. Marcus said:

If Fear and Whiskey can only be heard as an aphorism, what evanescence does it consider essential? A bitter sentimentality. This is the music of a small group of people who, in a pop moment now almost a decade gone, once thought all things were possible, and who now live in a society where nothing they want is possible as more than an evanescence. They still wear the old jewelry of the punk ideology of 1976: No Future, which was somehow turned into an adventure, which got mekons a major-label contract. If anything, their music today is stronger than it ever was, but against the confidence of mainstream music, it carries an unmistakable undertone of self-mockery, of humiliation, of shame, because it cannot count.

== Other projects ==
Langford has worked as the founder and member of several solo and band projects including The Three Johns, the Waco Brothers, a punk-meets-Johnny Cash-like ensemble, and the Pine Valley Cosmonauts, a project that explores the music of Bob Wills, Johnny Cash and others. Besides his solo albums Langford has released CDs with Richard Buckner, Kevin Coyne, Kat Ex (Katherina Bornefeld) of The Ex, Roger Knox, and The Sadies, in some cases using the Pine Valley Cosmonauts name.

In 2014, some of mekons, dubbing themselves the "mini-mekons", along with Robbie Fulks, went to northern Scotland to perform, sample the local whisky, and write and record an album on the island of Jura, in the studio of world and roots producer Giles Perring, a long-term collaborator with Mekon Susie Honeyman in the band Echo City. The record, named Jura, was released in November 2015 on Black Friday and is made up of original songs written on the trip, traditional songs, and a new recording of one Mekons song.

== Discography ==
- The Quality of Mercy Is Not Strnen (1979)
- The Mekons (1980)
- Fear and Whiskey (1985)
- The Edge of the World (1986)
- The Mekons Honky Tonkin' (1987)
- So Good It Hurts (1987)
- The Mekons Rock 'n Roll (1989)
- The Curse of the Mekons (1991)
- I Love Mekons (1993)
- Retreat from Memphis (1994)
- United (1996)
- Pussy, King of the Pirates (With Kathy Acker) (1996)
- Me (1998)
- Journey to the End of the Night (2000)
- OOOH! (Out Of Our Heads) (2002)
- Punk Rock (2004)
- Natural (2007)
- Ancient & Modern 1911 - 2011 (2011)
- Me-Tunes (2011)
- Jura (with Robbie Fulks) (2015)
- It Is Twice Blessed (2018)
- Deserted (2019)
- Horror (2025)
