= Punk Rock (album) =

Studio album by the Mekons
- Released: 2004
- Studio: Western Sound Labs
- Label: Quarterstick
- Producers: The Mekons, Kenneth Sluiter

The Mekons chronology
OOOH! (Out of Our Heads) (2002)	Punk Rock (2004)	Heaven & Hell: The Very Best of the Mekons (2004)

Punk Rock is an album by the band the Mekons, released in 2004. The Mekons supported the album with a North American tour. Punk Rock was a success on college radio.

== Production ==
The songs, written by the Mekons between 1977 and 1981, were recorded during the band's 25th anniversary tour. The band chose to record them live or live in the studio. Founding bandmember Jon Langford did not like the band's debut album, which he thought was not capably sung; he also lamented that it was released by Richard Branson's Virgin Records. Langford also thought that the songs still had meaning and were fun to play. The Mekons used a Canadian Mekons tribute band, Eaglebauer, on "Fight the Cuts". "The Building" was sung a cappella.

== Critical reception ==
Professional ratings
Review scores
Source	Rating
AllMusic	4/5 stars
Robert Christgau	A−
The Encyclopedia of Popular Music	3/5 stars
Rolling Stone	3/5 stars
The Tampa Tribune	B+

The Morning Call wrote that "the Mekons raise the right questions with the proper amount of skepticism, idealism and rude humor, without seeming to follow a formula." The Chicago Tribune determined that, "if the higher fidelity, better playing and technically anachronistic presence of later-addition Sally Timms' beautiful vocals belie (in the best possible way) the passage of time, the band does a great job capturing the rage and chaos of that important time."

Chuck Eddy, in The Village Voice, concluded that "Punk Rock salvages plenty of odes to failure/disgrace/infidelity/life-during-wartime plus drunken rants about bowing to republic and employer from rare imports long sold to used-vinyl stores, updating them with a pint-glass accordion-and-fiddle two-step jigginess Jon Langford's merry men and women didn't perfect till 1983's English Dancing Master EP." Rolling Stone noted that "the memorable, politically minded tunes are a testament to the band's bighearted collective spirit." Robert Christgau determined that "one comparison is the eponymous hardcore album Rancid dropped in 2000 when ska felt played out, but this is sharper and more varied."

AllMusic wrote that "there is a certain ramshackle grace in them that offers the ghostly hint of 1977's chaotic joy, but being played by people who no longer have the comfort of naivete as a cushion against the outside world."

== Track listing ==
No.	Title	Length
1.	"Teeth"
2.	"Corporal Chalkie"
3.	"I'm So Happy"
4.	"What"
5.	"32 Weeks"
6.	"Work All Week"
7.	"The Building"
8.	"Rosanne"
9.	"Trevira Trousers"
10.	"This Sporting Life"
11.	"Never Been in a Riot"
12.	"Lonely and Wet"
13.	"Fight the Cuts"
14.	"Chopper Squad"
15.	"Dan Dare"
