= Rico Bell =

English musician

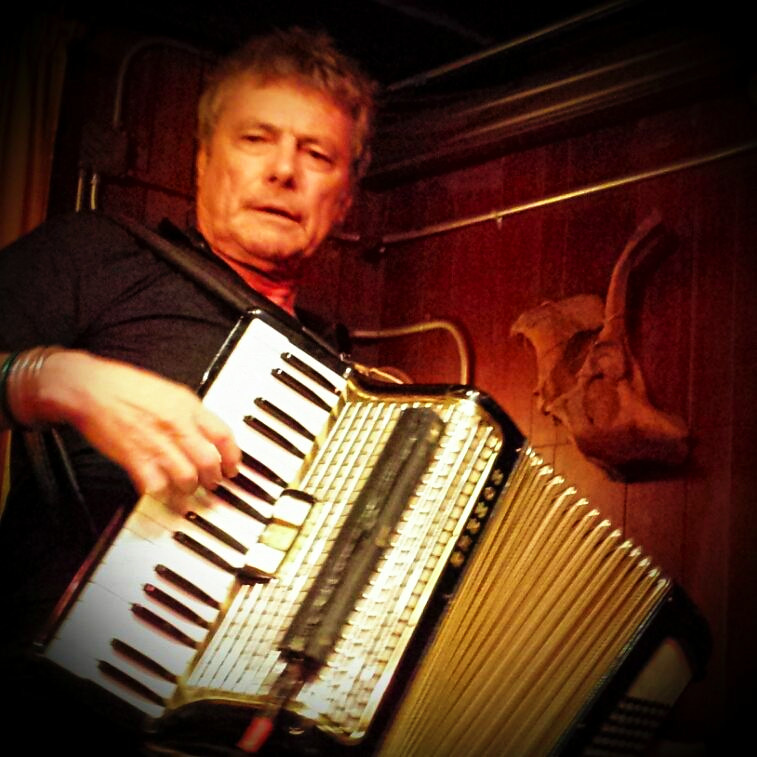
- Rico Bell performing with the Mekons at the Hideout Inn on July 11, 2015.

Background information
- Origin: Leeds, UK
- Genres: Alternative country, rock and roll, punk rock
- Occupation: Musician
- Instruments: Accordion, Harmonica
- Years active: 1983–present
- Label: Bloodshot Records
- Website: bloodshotrecords.com/artist/rico-bell

Rico Bell (born Eric John Bellis) is a UK and California based artist and musician best known for his work as a member of the British punk rock band the Mekons which he joined in 1983. A singer and multi-instrumentalist with the Mekons, Bell has also released three well-received solo recordings with the Chicago-based alternative country label, Bloodshot Records: The Return of Rico Bell (1995), Dark Side of the Mersey (1999) and Been a Long Time (2002).

== Career ==
Along with three other members of the Mekons (Kevin Lycett, Jon Langford and Tom Greenhalgh), Bell has created and exhibited art in the U.K. and U.S. as the collective Mekons for such projects as Mekons United (1996), OOOH! (2001), Art-Tube 01 (2001), and Hello Cruel World (2002). In addition, he performed with the rest of the band in Vito Acconci’s Theater Project for a Rock Band as part of the Brooklyn Academy of Music’s Next Wave Festival in 1995 and collaborated with Kathy Acker on her lesbian pirate operetta Pussy, King of the Pirates at the Museum of Contemporary Art, Chicago, in 1997, a production for which he also created and constructed the stage design and in which the characters were performed by the Mekons.

A graduate of the Wallasey School of Arts and Crafts near Liverpool, Bell’s own art has evolved stylistically over the years but remains primarily focused upon figurative painting. Much of his work has been influenced by British and American folk art of the 18th and 19th centuries and he has developed a variety of techniques to "age" the paintings, making the portraits appear old like the original naive paintings appear today. His themes are often rooted in nature, work and community and have featured the rural milieus of his native England, while much of his recent work features imagery from his adopted home of California and the American West and portray subjects such as farm workers, cattle herders and farm animals. His work has been exhibited in galleries and museums in the U.S. and U.K. including the Royal Academy in London and he has contributed illustrations to a number of publications including The New Yorker magazine.

While working on his painting and music after art school, Bell lived an itinerant life working on farms and riding, raising, and selling horses and, later, enjoyed a successful career as a museum and gallery exhibition designer in England. In the 1970s he was a regular performer at The Lamp Light in Wallasey, a club catering to the contemporary folk scene. Another regular performer there was a young musician from nearby Birkenhead named Declan MacManus who later found fame as Elvis Costello.

Like Costello and many other British musicians at the time, Bell’s music changed as the 1970s progressed and the punk revolution exploded. After moving to Bristol and forming a punk/new wave band, recording vocals for a solo album by Martin Barre of Jethro Tull and doing some session singing in London, Bell toured with the Leeds-based Goth band, The March Violets, in the early 1980s.

In 1983, Bell began singing and playing accordion with the Mekons and was on the band’s first U.S. tour in 1986 but stopped touring regularly with the band soon afterward. In 1995 he was back on the road and his contributions are found on every Mekons release since 1984 except Retreat from Memphis (1994). In addition, his music and vocals can be found on a number of compilation releases from Bloodshot Records.
