= Susie Honeyman =

Scottish violin player

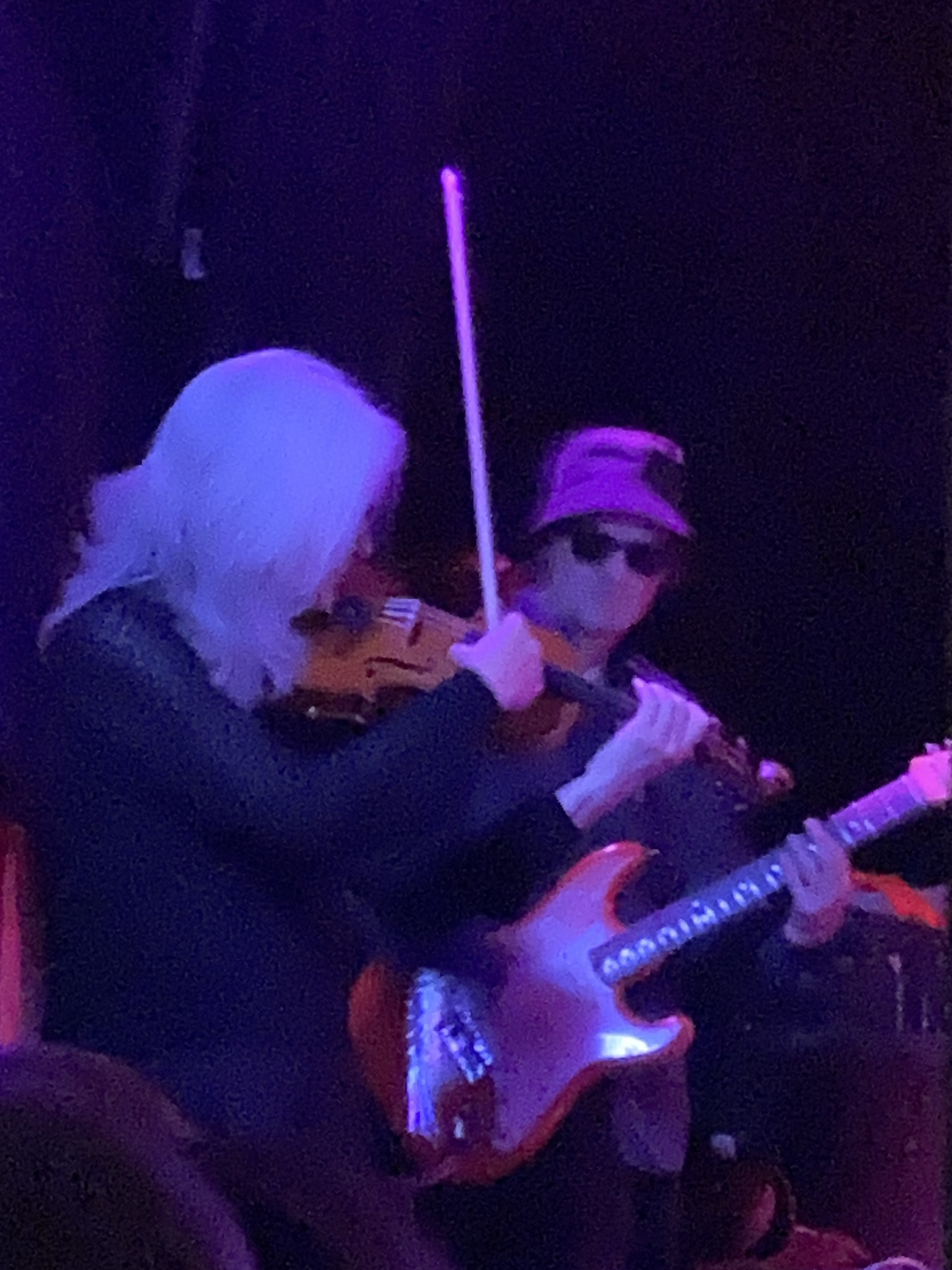
- Honeyman performing live with the Mekons, Glasgow, 2025

Background information
- Born: 31 January 1960 (age 66); Glasgow, Scotland
- Origin: Scottish
- Genres: Post-punk, Alternative rock, Sound sculpture
- Occupations: Musician, curator
- Instrument: Violin
- Labels: A&M Records, Bloodshot Records, Some Bizzare, Quarterstick Records, Fire Records, Grey Gallery Records

Susie Honeyman (born 31 January 1960) is a Scottish violin player best known for her work with The Mekons. She is co-founder of the Grey Gallery.

== Biography ==
Honeyman was born in Glasgow, Scotland. She studied music at the University of Edinburgh and moved to London in 1982. She is married to painter Jock McFadyen, with whom she has two children. Apart from her long involvement with the Mekons (she joined the band in October 1983) she has played live and recorded with many musicians, including The Fire Engines, Rip Rig + Panic, The Higsons (as the Susie Honeyman String Sensation), Mari Wilson (as a Melting Moment), Hermine and accordion player Ian Hill. Honeyman played with Vivian Stanshall from 1983 until his untimely death in 1995. She has also worked with double bassist Julia Doyle and drummer Dave Fowler and the Senegalese singer Nuru Kane.

From 1983 until 1992 Honeyman worked with Echo City, the sonic playground builders and performers, building the UK's first sonic playground in an adventure playground in Bethnal Green, making instruments, playing as a band and running music projects worldwide with children and adults with special needs, working in such varied locations as the Singapore Arts Festival, Glasgow Garden Festival, festivals in Canada and the Southbank Centre in London.

For many years she has collaborated with composer and multi-instrumentalist Giles Perring who was also in Echo City. In 2004 Susie and Giles Perring wrote 'Marsh Music' a piece incorporating tape loops of traffic from the A13 which formed part of a major mixed exhibition by the Architecture Foundation in collaboration with Jock McFadyen, Helena Ben Zenou, Iain Sinclair and Chris Petit. In 2005 the Wapping Project joined the Jerwood Foundation and Jazz on 3 (BBC) to commission a piece of music from Honeyman and Perring to accompany the disturbing monumental photographs of Annabel Elgar.

In 2005 Honeyman and her husband Jock McFadyen founded the Grey Gallery, a nomadic entity working with artists, musicians and writers on a project by project basis. Grey Gallery projects include an award-winning survey show of the sculptor Richard Wilson for the Edinburgh Art Festival 2008 and a solo show by the artist Bob and Roberta Smith 'This Artist is Deeply Dangerous' in 2009.

Aside from the Mekons, Honeyman is a member of Little Sparta, a three piece band based in London. Little Sparta has performed their own score live to Lotte Reiniger's 1926 film The Adventures of Prince Achmed at the Edinburgh Festival, and written music to accompany Allan Pollok-Morris's photographic exhibition Close: A Journey in Scotland, which toured the Chicago Botanic Garden and the United States Botanic Garden in Washington in 2011 and opened at the New York Botanical Garden in 2012.

== Selected discography ==
The Mekons

- see The Mekons discography

The Fire Engines

- Candyskin, 7", Pop Aural, 1981

Rip Rig + Panic

- Attitude, LP, Virgin, 1983

Vivian Stanshall

- Sir Henry at N'didi's Kraal, LP, Charisma, 1983

The Higsons

- Music to watch girls by, 7", 1984

Echo City

- Gramophone, LP, Gramophone Records, 1987
- The Sound of Music, CD, Some Bizzare, 1992
- Echo City – Sonic Sport 83–89 Part 1, Gramophone Records, 1995

Pere Ubu

- Worlds in Collision, CD, Polygram / Fontana Records, 1991

A House

- I Am The Greatest, CD, Setanta 1992

Cud (band)

- Asquarius, A&M Records, 1992

Compilation

- Rudy's Rocking Caravan, CD, Bloodshot, 1997

Little Sparta & Gerry Mitchell

- Scalpel Slice, CD, Fire Records, 2006
- Feasting on my heart: Keep Mother 5, 10” Vinyl, Fire Records, 2006
- The Ragged Garden, CD, Fire Records, 2007
- Little Sparta and Sally Timms, CD, Grey Gallery Records, 2009

Little Sparta

- The Adventures of Prince Achmed, 2010
- Close: Music for an exhibition, Grey Gallery Records, 2012
- Lost Boat Party, Grey Gallery Records, 2020
