= Sally Timms =

English singer and lyricist

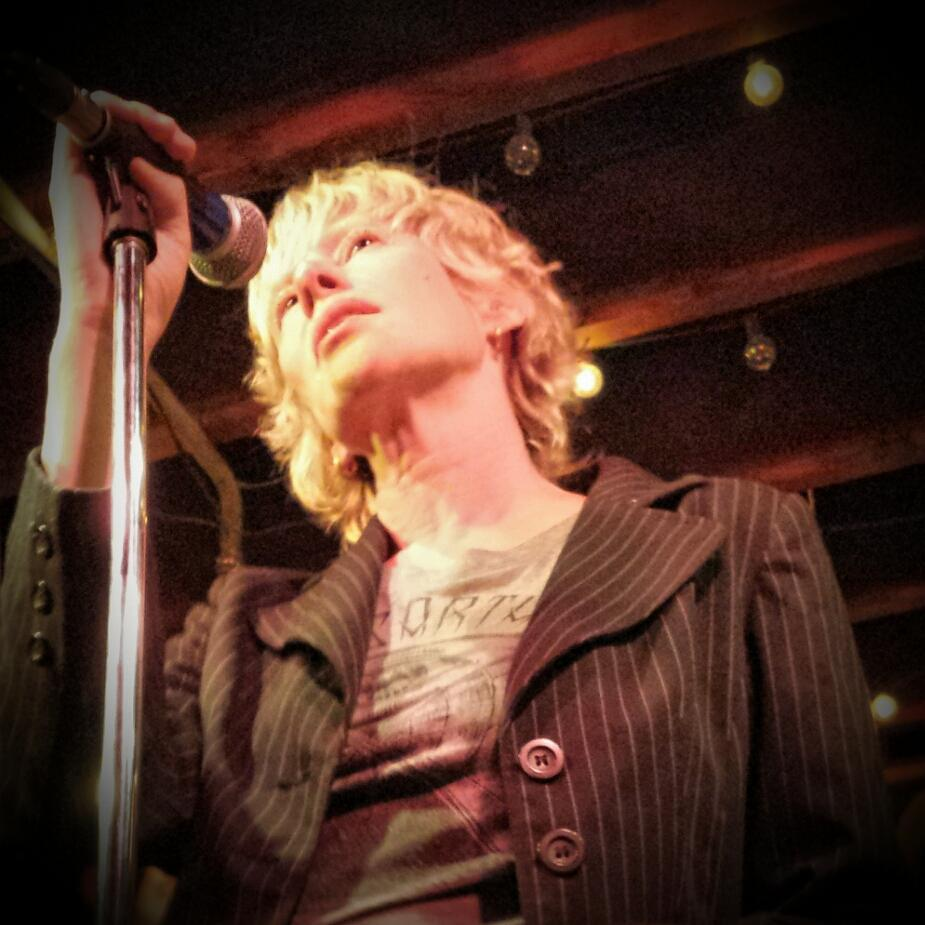
- Timms performing with the Mekons at the Hideout Inn in Chicago, Illinois, 2015

Background information
- Born: Sally Ann Timms; 29 November 1959 (age 66); Leeds, West Yorkshire, England
- Occupations: Musician; lyricist; producer
- Instrument: Vocals
- Years active: 1980–present
- Member of: The Mekons
- Formerly of: Wee Hairy Beasties
- Spouse: Fred Armisen (m. 1998; div. 2004)

Sally Ann Timms (born 29 November 1959) is an English singer and songwriter. Born in Leeds, West Yorkshire, England, she now lives in the Chicago area, where she works as a paralegal. She is best known for her long career as co-lead singer for the post-punk band the Mekons which she joined in 1985, and who have been described as "arguably […] the longest-running of all bands that emerged in the British punk explosion of 1977".

Timms has had a successful solo career in the lo-fi electronics and alternative country genres, notably writing the song "Horses", covered by Will Oldham.

== Career ==
Born in Leeds in 1959, Timms recorded her first solo album, Hangahar (an experimental improvised film score), at the age of 21 with Pete Shelley of Buzzcocks in 1980. Prior to joining The Mekons in 1986 she was in a band called the She Hees. She has released several other solo albums, Someone's Rocking My Dreamboat in 1988, To the Land of Milk and Honey in 1995, and a country album, Cowboy Sally's Twilight Laments for Lost Buckaroos, for Bloodshot Records in 1998. She gave herself the name "Cowboy Sally" after the character she played on TNT's Rudy and GoGo Show. Her solo recording In the World of Him was released in 2004 on Touch and Go Records.

Timms sang "Give Me Back my Dreams" on The Sixths' Hyacinths and Thistles and has recorded with Marc Almond, The Aluminum Group, Jon Rauhouse's Steel Guitar Show, the Sadies, Andre Williams, and A Grape Dope. She participated in Vito Acconci's Theater Project for a Rock Band as part of the Brooklyn Academy of Music's Next Wave Festival in 1995 and also, along with the rest of The Mekons, performed with Kathy Acker in her lesbian pirate operetta Pussy, King of the Pirates at the Museum of Contemporary Art in Chicago and elsewhere.

Timms' musical style is often placed under the genre of alternative country, and she has often toured with other bands on Bloodshot Records. She sang several songs on the Pine Valley Cosmonauts' The Executioner's Last Songs albums, which raised funds for the Illinois Moratorium Against the Death Penalty, and participated in fellow Mekon Jon Langford's multi-media performance project The Executioner's Last Songs. She co-wrote the song Horses, which was recorded by herself and Jon Langford on Songs of False Hope and High Values; by Palace Music, a.k.a. Bonnie Prince Billy.

She was the voice of SARA from Cartoon Network's Toonami block, voicing the first incarnation of the character from 1999 to 2004 alongside Steve Blum, the voice of TOM. Timms directed the first of the five Christmas pantos hosted by the Hideout bar in Chicago, and performed in several of them.

For many years Timms has lived in the Chicago, Illinois area, where she also works as a paralegal. She was married to musician and comedian Fred Armisen from 1998 to 2004.

=== The Mekons ===
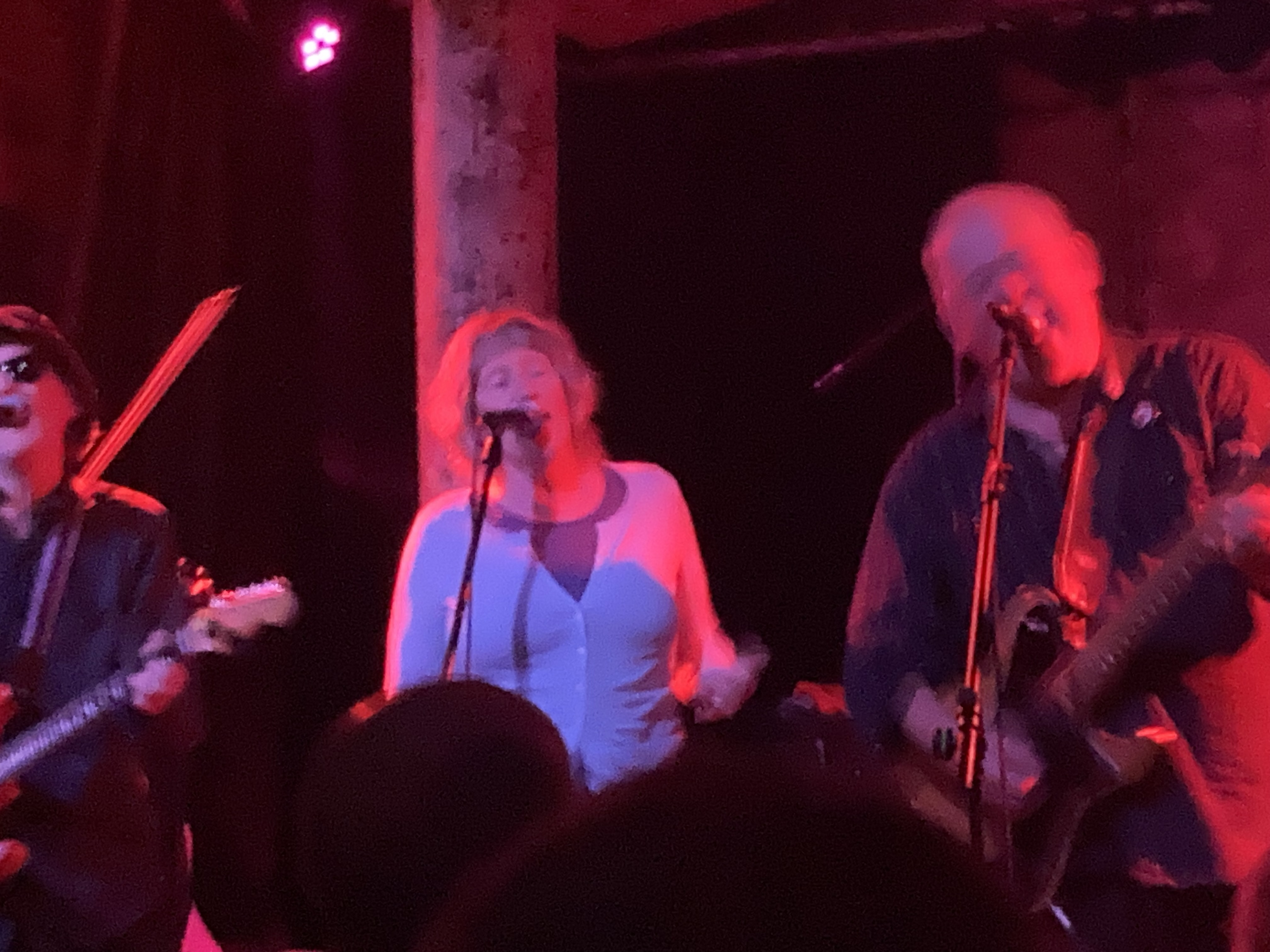
Timms performing live with the Mekons in 2025

Timms joined post-punk band The Mekons in the mid-1980s. A documentary titled The Revenge of the Mekons was released in 2014 by director Joe Angio. The band's style has evolved to incorporate aspects of country music, folk music, alternative rock, and occasional experiments with dub. They are known for their raucous live shows. The band, still including Timms on vocals, continue to record and perform live, as of 2021.

=== Wee Hairy Beasties ===
Wee Hairy Beasties were a children's music group based in Chicago, composed of Jon Langford, Sally Timms, Kelly Hogan, and Devil in a Woodpile. They played their first gig together at the Brookfield Zoo near Chicago, and released two albums in 2006 and 2008. Timms performed under the moniker Monkey Double Dippey.

=== Solo, etc. ===
Timms and Jon Langford, the other Chicago-based member of the Mekons, continue to collaborate on various recording and performance projects, ever since they both moved to Chicago. As of 2022, they frequently perform as a duo, and as a trio with a second guitarist, often at Chicago's Hideout.

== Solo discography ==
- 1980 – Hangahar
- 1988 – Somebody's Rockin' My Dreamboat
- 1995 – It Says Here
- 1995 – To the Land of Milk and Honey
- 1997 – Cowboy Sally
- 1999 – Cowboy Sally's Twilight Laments for Lost Buckaroos.
- 2000 – Songs of False Hope and High Values (with Jon Langford)
- 2004 – In the World of Him

=== Compilation contributions ===
- 2000: "Glue" by Andre Williams/V. Rice/O.M. Hayes) – Down to the Promised Land: 5 Years of Bloodshot Records – as Andre Williams & Sally Timms
- 2005: "Tumbling Tumbleweeds" – For A Decade of Sin: 11 Years of Bloodshot Records
- 2007: "Junco Partner" and "Version Pardner" – The Sandinista! Project – A Tribute to The Clash – Jon Langford and Sally Timms with Ship & Pilot (00:02:59 Records/MRI Associated Labels)
- 2014: "Mole Lotta Love", with Bobcat Goldthwait – 2776, the charity comedy album
