= Tom Greenhalgh =

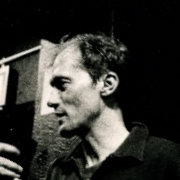
- Greenhalgh in 2002

Background information
- Born: 4 November 1956 (age 69); Stockholm, Sweden
- Genres: Post-punk, Alt-Country
- Occupations: Musician, visual artist
- Instrument: Guitar
- Years active: 1977–present
- Labels: Bloodshot Records, Fast Product

Thomas Charles Greenhalgh is a singer, songwriter and multimedia artist best known as a foundational member with the post-punk band the Mekons. While primarily credited as a guitarist in the early Mekons recordings, Greenhalgh's role as a lead singer and songwriter came to the forefront during the 1980s.

== Early life ==
Greenhalgh attended Sevenoaks School in Kent, with Andy Gill and Jon King, future members of the Gang of Four, as well as Kevin Lycett and Mark White, who would later form The Mekons. After Sevenoaks, he attended the University of Leeds. As students in the Fine Arts program, Greenhalgh, Lycett, White and Jon Langford formed the Mekons in 1976 and worked closely with the Gang of Four and Delta 5. In the politically charged atmosphere of the late 1970s, they participated in events such as Rock Against Racism.

== Music career ==
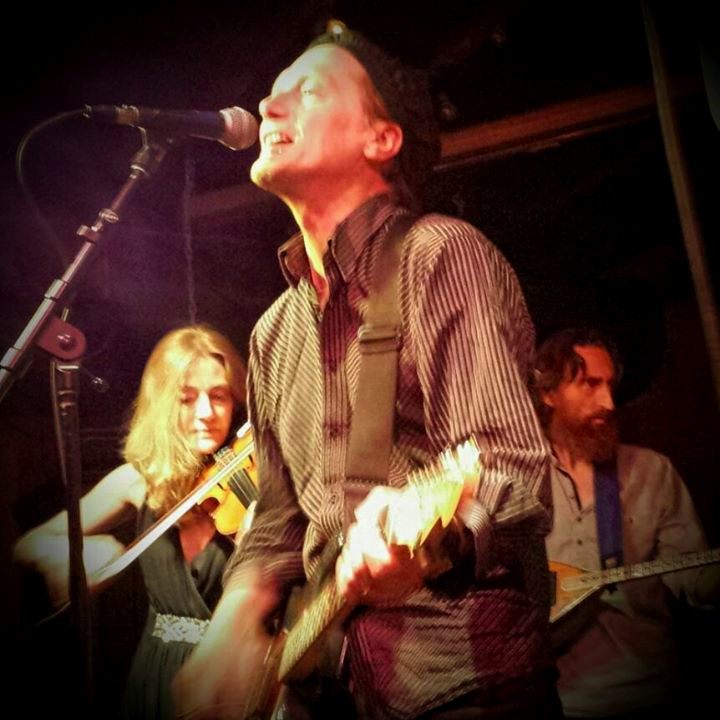
Tom Greenhalgh performing with the Mekons at the Hideout Inn in Chicago on 11 July 2015.

Along with Jon Langford, Kevin Lycett, Mark White, Ros Allen and Andy Corrigan, Greenhalgh formed the long living and prolific post-punk band the Mekons in 1976 when they were all art students at the University of Leeds. According to Greenhalgh, "the punk thing was an incredible spark of creativity, but it didn’t necessarily mean that you had to conform to what might conventionally be seen to be punk. It felt more like an imperative to do something. It was very much in the spirit of the times to get up and form a band. The 70s was a really interesting time for art, expanding into performance and conceptual art. So, it wasn’t such a strange leap to consider music as a viable activity for someone who wasn’t necessarily trained."

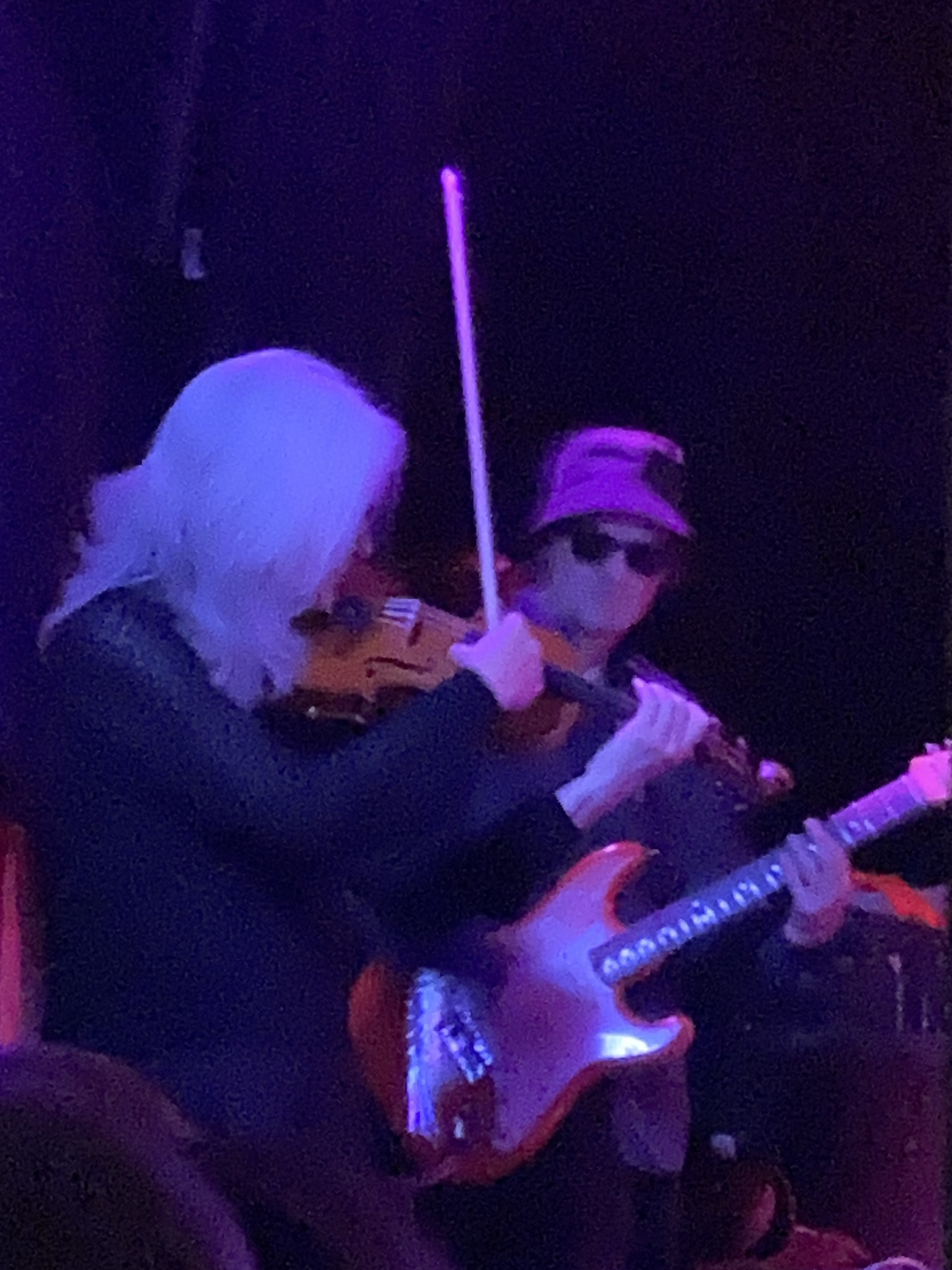
Greenhalgh performing live with the Mekons in 2025

Greenhalgh has taken part in a number of Mekons-related projects, many of which include Langford. He was The Three Johns' sound engineer for their first American tour in 1985. In 1988 Tom Greenhalgh collaborated with members of the Three Johns as the Jelly Bishops to release the five-song EP "Kings Of Barstool Mountain".

== Other work ==
Greenhalgh was a member of the band Red Hot Polkas, appearing on Let's Polkasteady (1987) and Two Step to Heaven (1989). Around 1991, he collaborated on Plate, recording yet-unreleased experimental electronic music. With fellow Mekon Sarah Corina, he recorded tracks on banjo ukulele; a sample ("Lowlands of Holland") of which appears on ResonanceFM's Clear Spot in 2002.

He produced Michelle Shocked's cover of the Beatles' "Lovely Rita" for the 1988 compilation Sgt. Pepper Knew My Father. He also produced Mush's second album, Face in Space (1998). In 2000, Curve guitarist Alex Mitchell and he (as DJ Sparky Lightbourne and DJ Tommy Tomtom) appeared at the Foundry in Shoreditch.
