= Bloodshot Records discography =

This is the Bloodshot Records discography, albums released on the Bloodshot Records label from 1994 until the present (as of 2014), ordered by catalog number.

While the record label started out releasing compilations of local Chicago area bands, they soon began to release albums for specific bands.

== Discography ==
=== Main catalog ===
Catalog	Artist	Record Name	Format	Date	Notes
BS 001	Various Artists	For a Life of Sin; Insurgent Chicago Country, Vol. 1	CD	1994	
BS 002	Moonshine Willy	Baby Alive	7"	1994	
BS 003	Waco Brothers	Bad Times Are Comin Round	7"	1994	"Bad Times Are Coming 'Round Again" b/w "The Harder They Come"
BS 004	Various Artists	Hell-Bent; Insurgent Country Vol 2	CD	1995	
BS 005	Moonshine Willy	Pecadores	CD	1995	
BS 006	Waco Brothers	To the Last Dead Cowboy	CD	1995	
BS 007	Old 97s	Eyes for You/W.I.F.E	CD	1995	
BS 008	Earl C. Whitehead & the Grievous Angels	Angels & Inbreds	CD	1995	
BS 009	Old 97s	Wreck Your Life	CD	9/1/1995	
BS 010	Old 97s	Cryin’ Drunk	7”	1995	
BS 011	Robbie Fulks	Country Love Songs	CD	6/27/1996	
BS 012	Rico Bell	Return of Rico Bell	CD	6/1/1996	
BS 013	Moonshine Willy	Complicated Game/George Set Me Strait	7”	1996	
BS 014	Various Artists	Nashville: The Other Side of the Alley; Insurgent Country, Vol. 3	CD	8/1/1996	
BS 015	Waco Brothers	Cowboy in Flames	CD	1/1/1997	
BS 016	Sally Timms	Cowboy Sally	CD	2/25/1997	
BS 017	Scroat Belly	Daddy's Farm	CD	11/1/1996	
BS 018	Moonshine Willy	Bold Displays of Imperfection	CD	10/1/1996	
BS 019	Various Artists	Straight Outta Boone County	CD	2/1/1997	
BS 020	Grievous Angels	New City of Sin	CD	5/1/1997	
BS 021	Whiskeytown	Theme for a Trucker	2 7"	4/2/2001	"Theme for a Trucker" b/w "My Heart Is Broken" "The Strip" b/w "Houses on the Hill"
BS 022	Riptones	Extra Sauce	CD	8/5/1997	
BS 023	Robbie Fulks	South Mouth	CD	10/7/1997	
BS 024	Waco Brothers	Do You Think About Me?	CD	9/9/1997	
BS 025	Volebeats	Maggot Brain Parts 1 & 2	7"	10/22/2001	
BS 026	Meat Purveyors	Sweet in the Pants	CD	1/20/1998	
BS 027	Alejandro Escovedo	More Miles Than Money: Live 1994-1996	CD	2/24/1998	
BS 028	Neko Case & Her Boyfriends	The Virginian	CD	2/10/1998	Mint 27
BS 029	Pine Valley Cosmonauts	...Salute the Majesty of Bob Wills	CD	10/6/1998	
BS 030	The Sadies & Neko Case	Murder Ballads	7"	5/6/2002	"Make Your Bed" b/w "Gunspeaks" & "Little Sadie"
BS 031	Trailer Bride	Smelling Salts	CD	3/24/1998	
BS 032	Moonshine Willy	Bastard Child	CD	4/7/1998	
BS 033	Pine Valley Cosmonauts	Misery Loves Company: Songs of Johnny Cash	CD	5/5/1998	Scout 1001
BS 034	The Sadies	Precious Moments	CD	6/23/1998	
BS 035	Split Lip Rayfield	Split Lip Rayfield	CD	7/21/1998	
BS 036	Neko Case & The Sadies, Kelly Hogan & the Mellowcremes	The Shortening Sessions: a Tribute to Loretta Lynn	7"	1999	"Rated X" b/w "Hanky Panky Woman"
BS 037	Whiskeytown/Neko Case	Car Songs	7"	10/20/1998	"Highway 145" b/w "My '63"
BS 038	Grievous Angels	Miles on the Rail	CD	9/8/1998	
BS 039	The Blacks	Dolly Horrorshow	CD	9/22/1998	
BS 040	Jon Langford	Gravestone	CD	8/1/1998	EP
BS 041	Andre Williams	Jet Black Daddy, Lilly White Mama	7"	10/20/1998	
BS 042	Devil in a Woodpile	Devil in a Woodpile	CD	11/3/1998	
BS 043	Waco Brothers	Waco World	CD	2/23/1999	
BS 044	Riptones	Cowboy's Inn	CD	2/9/1999	
BS 046	The Meat Purveyors	Play the Madonna Trilogy	7"	3/9/1999	"Like a Virgin" b/w "Burning Up" b/w "Lucky Star"
BS 047	Rico Bell & the Snakehandlers	Darkside of the Mersey	CD	7/20/1999	
BS 048	Andre Williams & The Sadies	Red Dirt	CD	5/18/1999	
BS 049	Alejandro Escovedo	Bourbonitis Blues	CD	4/20/1999	
BS 050	Neko Case	Furnace Room Lullaby	CD	2/22/2000	
BS 052	Various Artists	Poor Little Knitter on the Road: A Tribute to the Knitters	CD	9/21/1999	
BS 053	Rex Hobart & the Misery Boys	Forever Always Ends	CD	6/22/1999	
BS 054	Waco Brothers	Electric Waco Chair	CD	10/17/2000	
BS 055	The Sadies	Pure Diamond Gold	CD	9/21/1999	
BS 056	The Meat Purveyors	More Songs About Buildings & Cows	CD	7/6/1999	
BS 057	Split Lip Rayfield	In the Mud	CD	8/10/1999	
BS 058	Trailer Bride	Whine de Lune	CD	8/10/1999	
BS 059	Robbie Fulks	The Very Best of Robbie Fulks	CD	1/18/2000	
BS 060	Various Artists	Down to the Promised Land: Five Years of Bloodshot Records	2 CD	6/20/2000	
BS 061	Sally Timms	Cowboy Sally's Twilight Laments	CD	11/2/1999	
BS 062	Kelly Hogan & Pine Valley Cosmonauts	Beneath The Country Underdog	CD	4/4/2000	
BS 063	The Blacks	Just Like Home	CD	3/7/2000	
BS 064	Alejandro Escovedo	A Man Under the Influence	CD	4/24/2001	
BS 065	Devil in a Woodpile	Division Street	CD	7/18/2000	
BS 066	Old 97s	Early Tracks	CD	5/23/2000	
BS 067	Riptones	Buckshot	CD	8/22/2000	
BS 068	Split Lip Rayfield	Never Make It Home	CD	2/20/2001	first issued as 1,000 limited edition hand printed CD sleeves
BS 069	Rex Hobart & the Misery Boys	The Spectacular Sadness of...	CD	9/19/2000	
BS 070	The Sadies	Tremendous Efforts	CD	3/20/2001	
BS 071	Ryan Adams	Heartbreaker	CD	9/5/2000	
BS 072	Jon Langford & Sally Timms	Songs of False Hope & High Values	CD	7/1/2000	8-song EP, limited edition of 2,000 re-released CD with 4 newly recorded songs
BS 074	Pine Valley Cosmonauts	Executioner's Last Songs	CD	3/19/2002	
BS 075	Rex Hobart & the Misery Boys	Playin' a Couple of Hardluck Favorites	7"	5/1/2008	limited edition of 500
BS 076	Devil in a Woodpile	–	CD	–	with Honeyboy Edward
BS 077	Various Artists	Hard-Headed Woman: A Celebration of Wanda Jackson	CD	10/26/2004	Wanda Jackson tribute
BS 078	Various Artists	The Bottle Let Me Down	CD	6/18/2002	
BS 079	Kelly Hogan	Because It Feel Good	CD	10/9/2001	
BS 080	Wayne Hancock	A-Town Blues	CD	9/4/2001	
BS 081	Trailer Bride	High Seas	CD	6/19/2001	
BS 082	The Yayhoos	Fear not the Obvious	CD	8/7/2001	
BS 083	Wayne Hancock	The South Austin Sessions	EP	9/1/2008	limited edition 6-song EP
BS 084	Robbie Fulks	13 Hillbilly Giants	CD	11/6/2001	Boondoggle
BS 085	Waco Brothers	New Deal	CD	10/22/2002	
BS 086	Bottle Rockets	Songs of Sahm	CD	2/19/2002	
BS 087	Various Artists	Slaughter Rule soundtrack	CD	3/4/2003	
BS 088	Rico Bell	Been a Long Time	EP	4/1/2002	limited edition EP
BS 089	Bobby Bare Jr.	Young Criminals' Starvation League	CD	7/9/2002	
BS 090	Neal Pollack & Pine Valley Cosmonauts	The Neal Pollack Anthology of American Literature	CD	3/5/2002	
BS 091	The Meat Purveyors	All Relationships Are Doomed to Fail	CD	4/23/2002	
BS 092	Jon Langford & His Sadies	Mayors of the Moon	CD	2/4/2003	
BS 093	Jon Rauhouse	Steel Guitar Air Show	CD	9/24/2002	
BS 094	Rex Hobart & the Misery Boys	Your Favorite Fool	CD	9/24/2002	
BS 095	Pine Valley Cosmonauts	Executioner's Last Songs, Vol. 2&3	2 CD	6/17/2003	
BS 096	Legendary Shack*Shakers	Cockadoodledon't	CD	4/22/2003	
BS 097	Wayne Hancock	Swing Time	CD	8/19/2003	
BS 098	Dollar Store	Dollar Store	CD	2/3/2004	
BS 099	Neko Case	Blacklisted	CD	8/20/2002	
BS 100	Various Artists	Making Singles, Drinking Doubles	CD	11/12/2002	
BS 101	Trailer Bride	Hope Is a Thing With Feathers	CD	9/23/2003	
BS 102	Bobby Bare Jr.	O.K...I'm Sorry	CD	10/21/2003	EP; contains two videos
BS 103	Paul Burch	Fool for Love	CD	10/21/2003	
BS 104	Various Artists	Bloodshot U.K. 2003 Sampler	CD	6/25/2005	
BS 105	Jon Rauhouse	Steel Guitar Rodeo	CD	3/23/2004	
BS 106	Graham Parker	Your Country	CD	3/9/2004	
BS 107	Split Lip Rayfield	Old #6 / How Many Biscuits Can You Eat?	7"	2/4/2008	"Old #6" b/w "How Many Biscuits Can You Eat?" limited edition of 1,000
BS 108	Jon Langford	All the Fame of Lofty Deeds	CD	4/20/2004	
BS 110	Bobby Bare’s Young Criminal Starvation League	From the End of Your Leash	CD	6/22/2004	limited edition
BS 111	The Meat Purveyors	Pain by Numbers	CD	7/27/2004	
BS 112	Various Artists	For a Decade of Sin	2 CD	10/25/2005	
BS 113	Split Lip Rayfield	Should Have Seen It Coming	CD	9/28/2004	
BS 114	Rex Hobart & the Misery Boys	Empty House	CD	2/22/2005	
BS 115	Pine Valley Cosmonauts	Barn Dance Favorites	CD	4/1/2004	limited edition CD; 1,500 numbered and signed by Jon Langford
BS 116	Nora O’Connor	Til the Dawn	CD	8/24/2004	
BS 117	Devil in a Woodpile	In Your Lonesome Town	CD	3/8/2005	
BS 118	Jim & Jennie & the Pinetops	Rivers Roll on By	CD	4/26/2005	
BS 119	Waco Brothers	Freedom & Weep	CD	8/16/2005	
BS 120	Waco Brothers & Paul Burch	Great Chicago Fire	CD	4/24/2012	
BS 121	Various Artists	Bloodied But Unbowed	DVD	10/10/2006	
BS 122	Scott H. Biram	Dirty Old One Man Band	CD	3/22/2005	
BS 123	Graham Parker	Songs of No Consequence	CD	6/7/2005	
BS 124	Dollar Store	Money Music	CD	8/14/2007	
BS 125	Detroit Cobras	Baby	CD	9/27/2005	E-CD (LP+EP+video) "Baby" b/w "Seven Easy Pieces"; Video for "Cha Cha Twist"
BS 126	Deadstring Brothers	Starving Winter Report	CD	2/21/2006	
BS 127	Bottle Rockets	Zoysia	CD	6/6/2006	
BS 128	Cordero	En este momento	CD	3/14/2006	
BS 129	Mark Pickerel	Snake in the Radio	CD	5/9/2006	
BS 130	The Meat Purveyors	Someday Soon Things Will Be Much Worse!	CD	7/18/2006	
BS 131	Scott H. Biram	Graveyard Shift	CD	7/18/2006	
BS 132	Bobby Bare Jr.	The Longest Meow	CD	9/26/2006	
BS 133	Jon Rauhouse	Steel Guitar Heart Attack	CD	3/13/2007	
BS 134	Wayne Hancock	Tulsa	CD	10/10/2006	
BS 135	Paul Burch	East to West	CD	8/15/2006	
BS 136	Wee Hairy Beasties	Animal Crackers	CD	10/24/2006	
BS 138	Graham Parker	103 Degrees in June; GP & Figgs	CD	11/1/2006	
BS 137	The Silos	Come On Like the Fast Lane	CD	2/20/2007	
BS 140	Graham Parker	Don't Tell Columbus	CD	3/13/2007	
BS 139	Detroit Cobras	Tied and True	CD	4/24/2007	
BS 141	Danbert Nobacon	The Library Book of the World	CD	8/14/2007	
BS 142	Gore Gore Girls	Get the Gore	CD	6/26/2007	
BS 143	Various Artists	Just One More: A Musical Tribute Larry Brown	CD	5/22/2007	
BS 144	Waco Brothers	Waco Express; Live & Kickin' at Schubas	CD	3/4/2008	
BS 145	Ha Ha Tonka	Buckle in the Bible Belt	CD	9/11/2007	
BS 146	Mark Pickerel	Cody's Dream	CD	3/4/2008	
BS 147	Deadstring Brothers	Silver Mountain	CD	10/9/2007	
BS 148	Scotland Yard Gospel Choir	Scotland Yard Gospel Choir	CD	10/23/2007	
BS 149	Cordero	De donde eres	CD	8/26/2008	
BS 150	I’m Not Jim	Your Are All My People	CD	9/9/2008	
BS 151	Justin Townes Earle	The Good Life	CD	3/25/2008	
BS 152	Firewater	The Golden Hour	CD	5/6/2008	
BS 153	Justin Townes Earle	Yuma	EP	3/25/2008	
BS 154	Charlie Pickett	Bar Band Americanus	CD	10/7/2008	
BS 155	Andre Williams & the New Orleans Hellhounds	Can You Deal with It?	CD	7/29/2008	
BS 156	Ben Weaver	The Ax in the Oak	CD	8/12/2008	
BS 157	Bottle Rockets	Lean Forward	LP	2009	
BS 157	Bottle Rockets	Lean Forward	CD	8/11/2009	
BS 158	Dexter Romweber Duo	Ruins of Berlin	CD	2/10/2009	
BS 159	Deadstring Brothers	Sau Paulo	CD	2/23/2010	
BS 160	Justin Townes Earle	Midnight at the Movies	CD	3/3/2009	
BS 161	Scotland Yard Gospel Choir	...And the Horse You Rode in On	CD	9/15/2009	
BS 162	Rosie Flores & the Pine Valley Cosmonauts	Girl of the Century	CD	10/27/2009	
BS 163	Wayne Hancock	Viper Of Melody	CD	4/21/2009	
BS 164	Ha Ha Tonka	Novel Sounds of the Nouveau South	CD	6/16/2009	
BS 166	Exene Cervenka	Somewhere Gone	CD	10/6/2009	
BS 167	Scott H. Biram	Somethings Wrong/Lost Forever	CD	5/19/2009	
BS 169	Old 97’s	Complete Recordings	LP	12/17/2009	
BS 170	Alejandro Escovedo	Deluxe	LP	12/17/2009	
BS 171	Andre Williams	That's All I Need	CD	5/18/2010	
BS 172	Graham Parker	Imaginary Television	CD	3/16/2010	
BS 173	Ben Weaver	Mirepoix & Smoke	CD	10/19/2010	
BS 174	Maggie Bjorklund	Coming Home	CD	3/22/2011	
BS 175	Jon Langford & Skull Orchard	Old Devils	CD	8/24/2010	
BS 176	Whitey Morgan & the 78s	Whitey Morgan & the 78s	CD	10/12/2010	
BS 177	Exene Cervenka	The Excitement of Maybe	CD	3/28/2011	
BS 178	Justin Townes Earle	Harlem River Blues	CD	9/14/2010	
BS 179	Roger Knox & Pine Valley Cosmonauts	Stranger in My Land	CD	2/12/2013	
BS 180	Eddie Spaghetti	Sundowner	CD	2/13/2011	
BS 181	Ha Ha Tonka	Death of a Decade	CD	4/5/2011	
BS 182	Various Artists	No One Got Hurt	2xCD	4/16/2011	
BS 183	Firewater	International Orange	CD	9/11/2012	
BS 184	Justin Townes Earle	Move Over Mama/Racing...	7"	4/16/2011	
BS 185	Andre Williams	Hoods & Shades	CD	2/28/2012	
BS 186	Dex Romweber Duo	Is That You in the Blue?	CD	7/26/2011	
BS 187	Bottle Rockets	Not So Loud	CD	8/16/2011	
BS 188	Lydia Loveless	Indestructible Machine	CD	9/13/2011	
BS 190	Scott H. Biram	Bad Ingredients	CD	10/11/2011	
BS 191	JC Brooks & the Uptown Sound	Want More	CD	10/25/2011	
BS 193	Justin Townes Earle	Nothings Gonna Change The Way You Feel About Me Now	CD	3/27/2012	
BS 194	Rosie Flores	Working Girl's Guitar	CD	10/16/2012	
BS 195	Cory Branan	Mutt	CD	5/22/2012	
BS 198	Deadstring Brothers	Cannery Row	CD	4/9/2013	
BS 200	Murder By Death	Bitter Drink, Bitter Moon	CD	9/25/2012	
BS 202	Wayne Hancock	Ride	CD	2/26/2013	
BS 203	Whitey Morgan & the 78s	Born, Raised & LIVE from Flint	CD	12/2/2014	
BS 204	Eddie Spaghetti	The Value of Nothing	CD	6/18/2013	
BS 205	JC Brooks & The Uptown Sound	Howl	CD	5/21/2013	
BS 206	Luke Winslow-King	The Coming Tide	CD	4/23/2013	
BS 207	Ha Ha Tonka	Lessons	CD	9/24/2013	
BS 208	Barrence Whitfield & The Savages	Dig Thy Savage Soul	CD	8/13/2013	
BS 209	Cory Branan	The No-Hit Wonder	CD	8/19/2014	
BS 210	Dex Romweber Duo	Images 13	CD	3/18/2014	
BS 211	Robbie Fulks	Gone Away Backwards	CD	8/27/2013	
BS 212	Bottle Rockets	Re-Issues	CD	11/19/2013	
BS 213	Scott H. Biram	Nuthin' But Blood	CD	2/4/2014	
BS 214	Lydia Loveless	Boy Crazy	CD	11/5/2013	EP
BS 216	Luke Winslow-King	Everlasting Arms	CD	9/13/2014	
BS 218	Bobby Bare Jr	Undefeated	CD	4/15/2014	
BS 219	Lydia Loveless	Somewhere Else	CD	2/18/2014	
BS 221	Maggie Bjorklund	Shaken	CD	10/14/2014	
BS 223	Various Artists	While No One Was Looking: 20 Years of Bloodshot Records	CD/LP	11/18/2014	

- BS100. Waco Brothers: The Harder They Come; Volebeats: Maggot Brain; Neko Case: Make Your Bed (from Murder Ballads 7"); Neko Case: Rated X (with the Sadies) (from the Loretta Lynn 7"); Kelly Hogan: Hanky Panky Woman (also from the Loretta Lynn 7"); Andre Williams: 2 tracks including Jet Black Daddy, Lily White Mama; The Meat Purveyors: The Madonna Trilogy 7"; Rex Hobart: Every Rose Has Its Thorn (Poison) b/w Wasted Days and Wasted Nights (Freddie Fender) (from Hard Luck Favorites 7"); Jon Langford: Nashville Radio from Gravestone EP; previously unreleased tracks including things by Kelly; a collection of a lot of out of print 7" singles and some unreleased tracks

=== Bloodshot Distribution ===
Catalog	Artist	Record Name	Format	Date	Notes
BS 701	Asylum Street Spankers	Spanker Madness	CD	2000	Artemis 2000
BS 702	Asylum Street Spankers	A Christmas Spanking	CD	2001	
BS 703	Asylum Street Spankers	My Favorite Record	CD	9/24/2002	
BS 705	Mekons	Ancient and Modern	CD	9/27/2011	
BS 707	Firewater	Get Off the Cross, We Need the Wood for the Fire…	CD	6/19/2012	Re-issue
BS 708	Firewater	Psychopharmacology	CD	6/19/2012	Re-issue
BS 709	Firewater	The Man on the Burning Tightrope	CD	6/19/2012	Re-issue
BS 710	Firewater	Songs We Should Have Written	CD	6/19/2012	Re-issue
BS 911	The Blacks	In Sickness and Health	Digital	3/9/2010	

=== Bloodshot Revival ===
Catalog	Artist	Record Name	Format	Date	Notes
BS 801	Rex Allen	Last of the Great Singing Cowboys	CD/CS	3/23/1999	Bloodshot Revival
BS 802	Spade Cooley	Shame On You	CD/CS	4/20/1999	Bloodshot Revival
BS 803	Hank Thompson	Hank World	CD/CS	8/10/1999	Bloodshot Revival
BS 804	Pee Wee King	Country Hoedown	2xCD	11/2/1999	Bloodshot Revival
BS 805	Gov. Jimmie Davis	Louisiana	CD/CS	4/18/2000	Bloodshot Revival
BS 806	Hank Penny	Crazy Rhythm	CD/CS	7/18/2000	Bloodshot Revival
BS 807	Johnny Bond	Country & Western	CD/CS	1/16/2001	Bloodshot Revival
BS 808	Sons of the Pioneers	Symphonies of the Sage	CD	9/18/2001	Bloodshot Revival
BS 809	Sundowners	Chicago Country Legends	CD	11/3/2008	Bloodshot Revival

=== Misc ===
Catalog	Artist	Record Name	Format	Date	Notes
ANTI	Neko Case	The Tigers Have Spoken	CD	2004	
ARK21	Wayne Hancock	Best Of	CD	2005	
CCShow	Chris and Heather's Country Calendar Show	Chris and Heather's Country Calendar Show	CD	2005	
LHCR05	Ryan Adams	Cold Roses	CD	2005	
LSR001	Jon Rauhouse	Hawaiian Guitar Expedition	CD	2005	
MMTM 1002	Alejandro Escovedo	Room of Songs	CD	12/1/2005	
MRD-042	Corn Sisters	The Other Woman	CD	1999	
NUM 001	Eccentric Soul	The Capsoul Label	CD	10/11/2005	The Numero Group
NUM 002	Antena	Camino Del Sol	CD	2005	The Numero Group
NUM 003	Eccentric Soul	The Bandit Label	CD	10/11/2005	The Numero Group
NUM 004	Yellow Pills	Prefill	CD	2005	The Numero Group
NUM 005	Fern Jones	The Glory Road	CD	2005	The Numero Group
NUM 006	Cult Cargo	Belize City Boil Up	CD	10/25/2005	The Numero Group
NUM 007	Eccentric Soul	The Deep City Label	CD	1/31/2006	The Numero Group
ST 2	Sally Timms	In the World of Him	CD	2004	
TNT 001	Various Artists	Rudy's Rockin' Kiddie Caravan	CD	1997	
	The Meat Purveyors	Beans and Sweepins: Scraps from the Meatlocker	CD		Only available at Meat Purveyors shows and the Bloodshot website
	Wiggleworms	Wiggleworms Love You	CD	11/8/2005	Old Town School Recordings
	Jon Langford	Skull Orchard	CD	1998	Sugar Free 6
	Kelly Hogan	Whistle Only Dogs Can Hear	CD, CS	1996	Long Play 36
	Sally Timms and the Drifting Cowgirls	Somebody's Rocking My Dreamboat	LP	1988	T.I.M.
	Sally Timms	To the Land of Milk & Honey	CD	1995	Feel Good All Over/Bar/None/Koch 7002, Scout Scout 1002
	Sally Timms	It Says Here	CD	1995	Feel Good All Over 7004; 5-song EP
	Sally Timms and the Drifting Cowgirls	This House Is a House of Trouble	12"	1987	EP; T.I.M.
	Sally Timms and the Drifting Cowgirls	Butcher's Boy	12"	1987	T.I.M.
	Alejandro Escovedo	The End/Losing Your Touch	CD	1994	6-song EP; Watermelon 0017
	Alejandro Escovedo	With These Hands	CD	1996	Rykodisc 10343
	Anna Fermin's Trigger Gospel	Things to Come	CD	1999	
	Various	Bubbapalooza Two: A Tribute to Greg Smalley			
	Deanna Varagona	Tangled Messages	CD	2000	Star Star Stereo 4013; 8-song EP
	Various	Don't Let the Bastards Get you Down	CD	2002	Jackpine Social Club 102972
	Lonesome Bob	Things Fall Apart	CD	1997	Checkered Past
	Various	Rig Rock Truck Stop	CD, CS	1993	Fruit Of The Tune 999
	Various	Rig Rock Jukebox	CD, CS	1992	RCA/First Warning 75710
	Suicide Kings	Suicide Kings	CD		
	The Handsome Family	Twilight	CD	2001	Carrot Top 27
	The Handsome Family	In the Air	CD	2000	Carrot Top 23
	The Handsome Family	Through the Trees	CD	1998	Carrot Top 20
	The Handsome Family	Milk and Scissors	CD	1996	Carrot Top 011
	Mekons	Fear and Whiskey	CD	1985	Quarterstick Records
	Kirk Rundstrom	Wicked Savior	CD	2000	Kirk Rundstom 6906
	Kirk Rundstrom	Blue China	CD	2001	Catamount 7
	Alejandro Escovedo	Por Vida	CD	2004	live record special signed numbered set
	Alejandro Escovedo	Thirteen Years	CD, CS	1994	Watermelon 1017; 2002 2 CD reissue Texas Music Group 4507
	Alejandro Escovedo	By the Hand of the Father	CD	2002	Texas Music Group 8003
	Alejandro Escovedo	Gravity	CD, CS	1992	Watermelon 1007; 2002 2 CD reissue Texas Music Group 4508
	Robbie Fulks	Couples in Trouble	CD	2001	Boondoggle, BD 02
	Robbie Fulks	Let's Kill Saturday Night	CD	1998	Geffen, GEFD 25159
	Bottle Rockets	The Brooklyn Side	CD, CS	1994	East Side Digital 81002, Atlantic 92601
	Bottle Rockets	Bottle Rockets	CD	1993	East Side Digital 80772
	Neko Case	Canadian Amp	CD	2001	8-song EP; Lady Pilot 01
	Trailer Bride	Trailer Bride	CD	1996	Yep Roc 1002 (released in 1997)
	Volebeats	Mosquito Spiral	CD	2000	Third Gear 28
