= Psychopharmacology (album) =

Studio album by Firewater
- Released: April 17, 2001
- Recorded: Brooklyn, New York
- Genre: Indie rock
- Length: 40:12
- Label: Jetset
- Producer: Jamey Staub

Firewater chronology
The Ponzi Scheme (1998)	Psychopharmacology (2001)	The Man on the Burning Tightrope (2003)

Professional ratings
Review scores
Source	Rating
Allmusic	3.5/5 stars
Pitchfork Media	(8.6/10)

Psychopharmacology is the third album by Firewater, released on April 17, 2001 through Jetset Records.

== Track listing ==
All tracks are written by Tod Ashley.

No.	Title	Length
1.	"Woke Up Down"	3:14
2.	"Psychopharmacology"	4:07
3.	"Fell Off the Face of the Earth"	4:39
4.	"Get Out of My Head"	3:50
5.	"7th Avenue Static"	4:24
6.	"Car Crash Collaborator"	3:53
7.	"Bad, Bad World"	4:05
8.	"The Man With the Blurry Face"	4:14
9.	"Black Box Recording"	3:41
10.	"She's the Mistake"	4:05

== Personnel ==
Firewater

- Tod Ashley – vocals, bass guitar, Mellotron
- Oren Kaplan – guitar
- Tamir Muskat – drums, percussion
- Paul Wallfisch – organ, piano

Additional musicians and production

- Oren Bloedow – sitar on "Fell Off the Face of the Earth"
- Danny Blume – slide guitar on "The Man With the Blurry Face", piano on "She's the Mistake"
- Alex Cadvan – cello on "Black Box Recording"
- Jennifer Charles – vocals on "Bad, Bad World"
- Doug Henderson – mastering, engineering
- Scott Hull – mastering
- George Javori – drums on "Car Crash Collaborator"
- Ori Kaplan – alto saxophone on "Car Crash Collaborator"
- C. Kelley – piano on "She's the Mistake"
- Sylvia Massy – mixing
- Tim Otto – baritone saxophone and tenor saxophone on "Car Crash Collaborator"
- Hahn Rowe – violin on "7th Avenue Static"
- Jamey Staub – production, engineering, mixing
