= La Mar Enfortuna =

- Genre: Lost or forgotten music
- Label: Tzadik
- Members: Oren Bloedow, Jennifer Charles, Doug Wieselman, Ted Reichman, Robert DiPietro, and Brahim Fribgane

La Mar Enfortuna is the Sephardic side project from the alt rock group Elysian Fields, Oren Bloedow and Jennifer Charles. La Mar Enfortuna is a modern interpretation of lost or forgotten music, mostly of the Sephardim, from the 11th to the 16th century, with songs sung in Ladino, Arabic, Aramaic, Spanish, Greek, and English. They incorporate the sounds of jazz, folk, rock, Middle Eastern, and Latin musics. Besides Charles and Bloedow, the core group as it now stands includes Doug Wieselman, Ted Reichman and Robert DiPietro.

The group released two albums, an eponymous album in 2001 and Convivencia in 2007, both on John Zorn's Tzadik label. Guests on Convivencia include Ljova Zhurbin, Chuscales, Liaqat Khan, and Benjamin Lapidus. The band has played in Washington, DC, New York City, at La Cigale in Paris, La Huerta de Federico Garcia Lorca in Granada, Spain, and the Chicago World Music Festival.
