= Let's Kill Saturday Night =

Studio album by Robbie Fulks
- Released: September 15, 1998
- Genre: Country, rock and roll, folk-pop
- Label: Geffen
- Producer: Rick Will, Robbie Fulks

Robbie Fulks chronology
South Mouth (1997)	Let's Kill Saturday Night (1998)	The Very Best of Robbie Fulks (2000)

Let's Kill Saturday Night is the third album by the American musician Robbie Fulks, released on September 15, 1998. Fulks supported the album with a North American tour. The title track had previously been recorded by 5 Chinese Brothers.

== Production ==
Recorded in Nashville, the album was produced by Rick Will and Fulks. Fulks was interested in moving beyond confining alternative country labels. His songwriting was in part influenced by Elvis Costello. Fulks was unhappy with how the album was sequenced. "Little King" was written in 1989. Al Anderson sang on "You Shouldn't Have". "Night Accident" is about a man trapped in a car that is about to be hit by a train; it was inspired by an incident from Fulks's childhood. "God Isn't Real" is a defense of atheism; Fulks noted that people would occasionally leave his concerts when he played the song. Fulks duetted with Lucinda Williams on "Pretty Little Poison". "Can't Win for Losing You" is propelled by pedal steel guitar. "Take Me to the Paradise" is about an artists' restaurant and bar.

== Critical reception ==
Professional ratings
Review scores
Source	Rating
The Atlanta Constitution	B
The Encyclopedia of Popular Music	3/5 stars
Entertainment Weekly	B+
The Hamilton Spectator	4/4 stars
The Independent	5/5 stars
The Indianapolis Star	3.5/4 stars
Lincoln Journal Star	2/5 stars
The Ottawa Citizen	4/5 stars
Philadelphia Daily News	B
USA Today	2.5/4 stars

The Village Voice noted that the title track "has become a standard, one of those wistful odes to a dead end that makes the hair stand up." USA Today opined that "Fulks' songwriting may be uneven, but his vision is consistently bleak." The Hamilton Spectator said that the album "still finds him dipping into wells previously excavated by the Louvin Brothers and Tex Williams, although a good half of the record's 13 songs land squarely in rock and roll territory." The Milwaukee Journal Sentinel called the album "both derivative and eclectic, a flow of restrained Nashville studio craft that occasionally bumps into whimsical folk-pop of a high order." Robert Christgau praised "Pretty Little Poison" and "God Isn't Real".

The Independent labeled the album "a storming rustic rocker." The Indianapolis Star said that the "strong pop ballads ... show off vocal stylings reminiscent of Marshall Crenshaw and Freedy Johnston." The Atlanta Constitution concluded that "there's plenty of old-line C&W stylizing ... but the fun comes with the distorted guitars of 'Caroline' and the Byrdsian jangle of 'She Must Think That I Like Poetry'." The Philadelphia Daily News noted that "Fulks is a subtle lyricist, leaving room for varied interpretation". The New York Times stated that "Fulks's narrators aren't country's regular Joes ... woman trouble often drives them to a vindictive bitterness that verges on psychosis." Rolling Stone opined that the album "exhibits a weighty self-consciousness with little of its predecessors' spry, whimsical bite."

== Track listing ==
No.	Title	Length
1.	"Let's Kill Saturday Night"
2.	"Caroline"
3.	"Pretty Little Poison"
4.	"She Must Think I Like Poetry"
5.	"Bethelridge"
6.	"Take Me to the Paradise"
7.	"Little King"
8.	"You Shouldn't Have"
9.	"God Isn't Real"
10.	"Down in Her Arms"
11.	"Can't Win for Losing You"
12.	"Night Accident"
13.	"Stone River"
