= The Ponzi Scheme =

Studio album by Firewater
- Released: March 31, 1998
- Recorded: Winter 1997
- Studio: RPM, NYC; Excello, Brooklyn
- Genre: Alternative rock
- Length: 42:58
- Label: Jetset
- Producer: Tod Ashley, Doug Henderson

Firewater chronology
Get Off the Cross (1996)	The Ponzi Scheme (1998)	Psychopharmacology (2001)

Professional ratings
Review scores
Source	Rating
AllMusic	3/5 stars
Pitchfork Media	8.6/10

The Ponzi Scheme is the second studio album by the American alternative rock band Firewater. It was released in 1998 by Jetset.

== Critical reception ==
The Washington Post wrote that "The Ponzi Scheme isn't as diabolically sophisticated as it intends, but the band ... does have a cosmopolitan style." The Calgary Herald listed it as the eighth best album of 1998, writing that it "brings together a potpourri of elements—horns, guitars, jazz, Latin, ska, funk and rock riffs—and creates a magnificent musical melange."

== Track listing ==
All tracks are written by Tod Ashley

No.	Title	Length
1.	"Ponzi's Theme"	2:43
2.	"Green Light"	3:30
3.	"Dropping Like Flies"	3:50
4.	"Caroline"	4:00
5.	"Whistling in the Dark"	3:21
6.	"Isle of Dogs"	4:19
7.	"El Borracho (Ponzi's Relapse)"	1:56
8.	"Another Perfect Catastrophe"	4:19
9.	"So Long, Superman"	3:46
10.	"I Still Love You, Judas"	3:54
11.	"Knock 'Em Down"	3:18
12.	"Drunkard's Lament"	3:55

== Personnel ==
Adapted from The Ponzi Scheme liner notes.

Firewater

- Tod Ashley – lead vocals, bass guitar, production
- George Javori – drums
- Ori Kaplan – guitar
- Tim Otto – saxophone
- Hahn Rowe – violin
- Paul Wallfisch – piano, organ

Additional musicians

- Duane Denison – guitar (11, 12)
- Pamela Fleming – trumpet (7)
- Susan Graham – alto saxophone (7)
- Paula Henderson – baritone saxophone (7)
- Jennifer Hill – saxophone (7), piccolo (7)
- Kurt Hoffman – saxophone (11, 12)

Additional musicians (cont.)

- Jim Kimball – drums (11, 12)
- Tamir Muskat – drums (2, 8)
- David Ouimet – piano (7, 11, 12), organ (7, 11, 12), trombone (7, 11, 12)
- Joe Plummer – saxophone (7)
- Jane Scarpantoni – cello (3, 4, 10, 12)
- Birgit Staudt – accordion (5)

Production and additional personnel

- Jay Healy – mixing (3)
- Doug Henderson – production, mixing (1, 6, 7, 9, 11, 12)
- Rod Hui – mixing (5)
- Ted Jensen – mastering
- Sylvia Massy – mixing (2, 4, 8–10)

== Release history ==
Region	Date	Label	Format	Catalog
United States	1998	Jetset	CD	TWA11
United States	1998	Universal	CD	UD 53161
