= Bleed Your Cedar =

Studio album by Elysian Fields
- Released: 1996
- Studio: Pachyderm (Cannon Falls, Minnesota)
- Genre: Alternative rock
- Label: Radioactive/MCA
- Producer: Oren Bloedow, Ed Pastorini

Elysian Fields chronology
Elysian Fields (1996)	Bleed Your Cedar (1996)	Clinical Trial (1997, recorded)

Bleed Your Cedar is the debut album by the American band Elysian Fields, released in 1996. It was a commercial disappointment.

The album's first single was "Star". The band promoted Bleed Your Cedar by touring with labelmates the Heads.

== Production ==
The album was produced by band members Oren Bloedow and Ed Pastorini. It was recorded in two weeks at Pachyderm Recording Studio, where the band chose from a pool of 20 songs. James Genus played bass on the album. "Star" first appeared on the band's EP. A photograph of the band's singer, Jennifer Charles, adorns the album cover; Charles wrote all of the lyrics.

== Critical reception ==
Professional ratings
Review scores
Source	Rating
AllMusic	4/5 stars
Boston Herald	2.5/4 stars
Dayton Daily News	2.5/4 stars
Knoxville News Sentinel	4/5 stars
MusicHound Rock: The Essential Album Guide	2.5/5 stars
San Antonio Express-News	2/4 stars
The Star	4/5 stars

The Village Voice wrote that Bleed Your Cedar is "never strictly rock, trip, hop, jazz, or classical, although it embodies the characteristics of each... More accurately, Bleed is an improv bouillabaisse—elegant licks, simple melodies, and wistful minor chords held together by drummer Ben Perowsky's ever steady beat, and Charles." The Knoxville News Sentinel opined: "Pitted against otherworldly guitars, lulling bass lines and drifting keyboards, Charles slips into the hypnotic cadences with erotic grace." The Boston Herald thought that, "after five or six songs, the band's crawling tempos and Charles' doped-up vocals take on a woozy sameness."

The Los Angeles Times called Charles "a provocative crooner who intones like a cross between Mazzy Star low-key blueswoman Hope Sandoval and Congo Norvell torch queen Sally Norvell." The Dayton Daily News declared that "extreme cool has its place, of course, but just a little more heat would have made this ... a lot more exciting, not to mention easier to get through." The Naples Daily News' Steve Bailey concluded that the band "use effects like the tinkling of piano keys or the rich, eerie whine of the sitar to perfectly set the tone for Charles' mournful vocals and lyrics"; he later listed the album as the eighth best of 1996.

AllMusic deemed the album "a set of slow, gloomy and occasionally seductive jangle-pop that's often quite reminiscent of Mazzy Star."

== Track listing ==
No.	Title	Length
1.	"Lady in the Lake"
2.	"Jack in the Box"
3.	"Off or Out"
4.	"Fountains of Fire"
5.	"Star"
6.	"Anything You'd Like"
7.	"Sugarplum Arches"
8.	"Parachute"
9.	"Gracie Lyons"
10.	"Rolling"
11.	"Mermaid"
