= Get Off the Cross, We Need the Wood for the Fire =

Get off the Cross, We Need the Wood for the Fire

Studio album by Firewater
- Released: 1996
- Recorded: RPM, NYC
- Genre: Alternative rock
- Length: 42:03
- Label: Jetset
- Producers: Tod Ashley, Doug Henderson

Firewater chronology
Get off the Cross, We Need the Wood for the Fire (1996)	The Ponzi Scheme (1998)

Get Off the Cross, We Need the Wood for the Fire is the debut studio album by Firewater, released in 1996 via Jetset Records. It is a marked difference in sound from Tod Ashley's previous work in Cop Shoot Cop. In 2017, the album was re-issued on vinyl in celebration of the twentieth anniversary of its release by Checkered Past Records.

== Critical reception ==
Professional ratings
Review scores
Source	Rating
AllMusic	3/5 stars
Alternative Press	3/5 stars

The St. Louis Post-Dispatch concluded that "Tod A's smart lyrics combine seamlessly with Denison's fiery guitar, and the result is thoughtful, catchy and a lot of fun."

== Track listing ==
All tracks are written by Tod Ashley.

No.	Title	Length
1.	"Some Strange Reaction"	4:44
2.	"Bourbon and Division"	3:23
3.	"Refinery"	4:23
4.	"When I Burn This Place Down"	3:01
5.	"The Circus"	4:45
6.	"I Am the Rain"	3:46
7.	"Balalaika"	3:05
8.	"The Drunken Jew"	2:06
9.	"Mr. Cardiac"	3:38
10.	"Snake-eyes and Boxcars"	3:04
11.	"One of Those"	3:22
12.	"Hold On, Slow John"	3:40

== Personnel ==
Adapted from the Get Off the Cross, We Need the Wood for the Fire liner notes.

Firewater

- Tod Ashley – lead vocals, bass guitar, acoustic guitar, bouzouki, production
- Duane Denison – guitar
- Yuval Gabay – drums, djembe, tambourine
- Kurt Hoffman – saxophone, clarinet, accordion
- Jim Kimball – drums
- David Ouimet – piano, organ
- Hahn Rowe – violin

Additional musicians

- Jennifer Charles – vocals (5, 9)
- Jane Scarpantoni – cello (3, 5, 7)

Production

- Doug Henderson – production, recording, mixing
- Rod Hui – mixing (9)
- Scott Hull – mastering

== Release history ==
Region	Date	Label	Format	Catalog
United States	1996	Jetset	CD	TWA04
United States	2017	Checkered Past	LP	CPR 030
