= The Man on the Burning Tightrope =

Studio album by Firewater
- Released: June 17, 2003
- Recorded: Vibromonk Studios, Brooklyn, New York
- Genre: Indie rock
- Length: 46:51
- Label: Jetset
- Producer: Tod Ashley, Tamir Muskat

Firewater chronology
| Psychopharmacology (2001) | The Man on the Burning Tightrope (2003) | Songs We Should Have Written (2004) |

Professional ratings
Review scores
| Source | Rating |
|---|---|
| AllMusic | 3.5/5 stars |
| Pitchfork Media | 5.7/10 |
| Stylus Magazine | D+ |

The Man on the Burning Tightrope is the fourth album by Firewater, released in 2003 through Jetset Records.

== Track listing ==
All tracks are written by Tod Ashley, except where noted.

| No. | Title | Writer(s) | Length |
|---|---|---|---|
| 1. | "Fanfare" | Tod Ashley, Oren Kaplan | 0:22 |
| 2. | "Anything at All" | | 4:20 |
| 3. | "Too Much (Is Never Enough)" | | 4:00 |
| 4. | "Too Many Angels" | Tod Ashley, Tamir Muskat | 5:00 |
| 5. | "Dark Days Indeed" | | 4:12 |
| 6. | "The Man on the Burning Tightrope" | | 3:52 |
| 7. | "The Truth Hurts" | | 1:18 |
| 8. | "Secret" | | 4:57 |
| 9. | "The Vegas Strip" | | 3:01 |
| 10. | "Ponzi's Revenge" | | 2:41 |
| 11. | "Don't Make It Stop" | | 3:09 |
| 12. | "The Notorious & Legendary Dog & Pony Show" | | 3:44 |
| 13. | "The Song That Saved My Life" | | 2:07 |
| 14. | "Dark Days Revisited" | | 0:41 |
| 15. | "Before the Fall" | Tod Ashley, Oren Kaplan | 3:10 |
| 16. | "Descent" | Tod Ashley, Tamir Muskat | 0:17 |

== Personnel ==
Firewater

- Tod Ashley – vocals, bass guitar, Mellotron, bouzouki, production, design
- Oren Kaplan – guitar
- Tamir Muskat – drums, loops, production, mixing
- Paul Wallfisch – organ, piano, celesta

Additional musicians and production

- Dave Ballou – trumpet, flugelhorn on "Too Many Angels"
- Joe Fiedler – trombone on "The Vegas Strip", "Ponzi's Revenge" and "Don't Make It Stop"
- Victoria Hanna – vocals on "Dark Days Indeed" and "Dark Days Revisited"
- Scott Hull – mastering
- Yuri Lemeshev – accordion on "Dark Days Indeed", "Dark Days Revisited" and "Before the Fall"
- Willy Martinez – percussion on "Too Much (Is Never Enough)", "The Truth Hurts" and "Ponzi's Revenge"
- James Moore – cover art
- Morgan St. Boot Boys – stomping on "Dark Days Indeed"
- The Muskat Orchestra – horns on "Anything at All", strings on "Secret", arrangement on "Secret" and "The Vegas Strip"
- Ramallah Orphan Choir – backing vocals on "Dark Days Indeed"
- Asaf Roth – glockenspiel and cymbal on "Fanfare" and "Before the Fall", marimba on "The Vegas Strip"
- Dan Shatsky – mixing
- Itamar Ziegler – bass guitar on "Too Much (Is Never Enough)" and "Secret"
