= Georgia Hard =

Studio album by Robbie Fulks
- Released: May 17, 2005
- Studios: Ocean Way, Nashville
- Genre: Country
- Length: 57:15
- Label: Yep Roc

Robbie Fulks chronology
13 Hillbilly Giants (2001)	Georgia Hard (2005)	Revenge! (2007)

Georgia Hard is the sixth studio album by the American country musician Robbie Fulks, released on May 17, 2005, on Yep Roc Records.

== Critical reception ==
Professional ratings
Review scores
Source	Rating
AllMusic	3.5/5 stars
Country Standard Time	(favorable)
Entertainment Weekly	A
Exclaim!	(mixed)
No Depression	(favorable)
Pitchfork Media	4.1/10
PopMatters	9/10 stars
The Village Voice	A–

Georgia Hard received mainly favorable reviews from critics. Robert Christgau gave it an A−, and later ranked it No. 38 on his 2005 Pazz & Jop list. PopMatters also named it the 4th best country album of the year, and CMT's Edward Morris named it one of his ten favorite country albums of the year.

== Track listing ==
1. Where There's a Road – 3:54
2. It's Always Raining Somewhere – 3:17
3. Leave It to a Loser – 3:28
4. Georgia Hard – 4:14
5. I'm Gonna Take You Home (And Make You Like Me) – 3:01
6. Coldwater, Tennessee – 5:13
7. All You Can Cheat – 2:50
8. Countrier Than Thou – 3:25
9. If They Could Only See Me Now – 4:26
10. I Never Did Like Planes – 3:29
11. Each Night I Try – 3:10
12. Doin' Right (For All the Wrong Reasons) – 4:24
13. You Don't Want What I Have – 5:43
14. Right On Redd – 3:30
15. Goodbye, Cruel Girl – 3:11
