= Songs We Should Have Written =

Studio album by Firewater
- Released: January 20, 2004
- Recorded: Vibromonk Studios, Brooklyn, New York
- Genre: Indie rock
- Length: 45:12
- Label: Jetset
- Producer: Tod Ashley, Tamir Muskat

Firewater chronology
The Man on the Burning Tightrope (2003)	Songs We Should Have Written (2004)	The Golden Hour (2008)

Professional ratings
Review scores
Source	Rating
AllMusic	3.5/5 stars
Pitchfork Media	7.0/10
Stylus Magazine	B−

Songs We Should Have Written is a cover album by Firewater, released in 2004 through Jetset Records.

== Track listing ==
No.	Title	Writer(s)	Original artist (date)	Length
1.	"The Beat Goes On"	Sonny Bono	Sonny & Cher (1967)	4:01
2.	"This Town"	Lee Hazlewood	Nancy Sinatra & Lee Hazlewood (1967)	4:09
3.	"Diamonds & Gold"	Tom Waits	Tom Waits (1985)	3:52
4.	"Folsom Prison Blues"	Johnny Cash	Johnny Cash (1955)	4:56
5.	"Storm Warning"	Duke Reid, Lynn Taitt	Lynn Taitt & The Boys (1966)	3:00
6.	"Hey Bulldog"	John Lennon	The Beatles (1969)	3:15
7.	"Some Velvet Morning"	Lee Hazlewood	Nancy Sinatra & Lee Hazlewood (1967)	4:22
8.	"This Little Light of Mine"	Harry Dixon Loes		3:38
9.	"Paint It Black"	Jagger/Richards	The Rolling Stones (1966)	5:51
10.	"Is That All There Is?"	Jerry Leiber and Mike Stoller	Peggy Lee (1969)	4:11
11.	"I Often Dream of Trains"	Robyn Hitchcock	Robyn Hitchcock (1984)	3:57

== Personnel ==
Firewater

- Tod Ashley – vocals, bass guitar, Mellotron, production, design
- Oren Kaplan – guitar
- Al Jenkins – guitar
- Tamir Muskat – drums, loops, Mellotron, B-3 organ, production, mixing

Additional musicians and production

- Doug Henderson – recording on "This Little Light of Mine"
- George Javori – drums on "This Little Light of Mine"
- Emily Lazar – mastering
- Ramesh Mishra – sārangī on "Paint It Black"
- Britta Phillips – vocals on "The Beat Goes On" and "Some Velvet Morning"
- Asaf Roth – marimba on "Diamonds and Gold"
- Vijaykumar Sant – sitar on "Paint It Black"
- Pandit Sharda – tabla on "Paint It Black"
- Dan Shatsky – mixing
- Steve Ulrich – steel guitar on "Folsom Prison Blues" and "This Little Light of Mine"
- Paul Wallfisch – organ, piano
- Zef – cello on "Diamonds and Gold"
