= The Golden Hour (album) =

Studio album by Firewater
- Released: May 6, 2008
- Genre: Indie rock
- Length: 56:21
- Label: Bloodshot
- Producer: Tamir Muskat

Firewater chronology
Songs We Should Have Written (2004)	The Golden Hour (2008)	International Orange! (2012)

Professional ratings
Aggregate scores
Source	Rating
Metacritic	(72/100)
Review scores
Source	Rating
Allmusic	4/5 stars
The A.V. Club	(B−)
PopMatters	(7/10)
Uncut	3/5 stars

The Golden Hour is the sixth album by Firewater (their fifth album of original songs), released on May 6, 2008 through Bloodshot Records.

== Track listing ==
All tracks are written by Tod Ashley.

No.	Title	Length
1.	"Borneo"	3:34
2.	"This Is My Life"	3:42
3.	"Some Kind of Kindness"	5:11
4.	"Six Forty Five"	5:03
5.	"A Place Not So Unkind"	4:33
6.	"Paradise"	4:23
7.	"Banghra Bros"	2:38
8.	"Electric City"	4:38
9.	"Hey Clown"	3:35
10.	"Already Gone"	3:59
11.	"Feels Like the End of the World"	5:14
12.	"Weird to Be Back"	3:48
13.	"Three Legged Dog"	3:32

== Personnel ==
Musicians

- Sain Muhammad Ali – tumba, additional vocals
- Tod Ashley – vocals, Farfisa organ, percussion, loops, photography, design, engineering, mixing
- Lal Chand Baral – dhol
- Orçun Bastürk – djembe, dumbek, udu
- Gulsah Guray – spoken word
- Amdad Hussain – dholki
- Ijaz Hussain – harmonium
- Mangu Khan – dhol, clapping
- Tikay Khan – additional vocals
- Uri Brauner Kinrot – banjo, electric guitar, acoustic guitar
- Avi Lebovich – trombone
- Levantine Boys Choir – additional vocals, clapping
- Tamir Muskat – drums, percussion, additional vocals, production, mixing
- Ozun Usta – djembe, drums, ghatam
- Tomer Yosef – banjo, darbouka, djembe, percussion
- Itamar Ziegler – acoustic bass, twelve-string guitar, acoustic guitar

Additional musicians and production

- Dan Shatsky – engineering
- Burok Tamer – engineering
- Alan Ward – mastering
- Yoni Zigler – photography
