= Churchwood =

American rock band

- Origin: Austin, Texas, U.S.
- Genres: Alternative rock, blues rock, experimental rock, post-punk
- Years active: 2007-present
- Label: Saustex Records
- Members: Bill Anderson; Joe Doerr; Adam Kahan; Billsteve Korpi; Eric Bohlke
- Website: www.saustexmedia.com/CHURCHWOOD.html

Churchwood is an avant-blues quintet from Austin, Texas known for its poetry-driven lyrics, high-energy performances, and eccentric approach to making blues-based rock and roll. The lineup consists of Bill Anderson (guitar), Joe Doerr (vocals, harmonica), Adam Kahan (bass), Billysteve Korpi (guitar), and Eric Bohlke (drums).

== Musical and lyrical style and influence ==
Churchwood's musical influences are wide-ranging. The band's self-proclaimed "dystopic blues" style belies its reverence for the likes of Howlin' Wolf, Muddy Waters, Bo Diddley, and other blues masters; however, many critics suggest that musical risk-takers like Captain Beefheart and the Magic Band, Tom Waits, and Nick Cave are of equal importance to Churchwood's sound. Much like his published poetry, Doerr's lyrics reflect an interest in French Symbolism, Literary Modernism, Surrealism, and Beat Poetry. His themes are largely existentialist in scope: absurdity, anxiety, alienation, passion, individuality, and authenticity are his primary concerns.

== History ==
Churchwood formed in 2007 in Austin, Texas and signed with San Antonio's Saustex Records in 2010. The band released six LPs on the Saustex label: Churchwood (2011), Churchwood 2 (2013), 3: Trickgnosis (2014), Hex City, (2016) Plenty Wrong to Go Awry (2020), and The Boule Oui (2022). Two additional records by Churchwood, an EP titled Just the Two of Us (2012), and a 2-track single of cover songs by Evan Johns titled Johns 2:22 (2023) also appear courtesy of Saustex.

In 2011, Churchwood placed their song "Rimbaud Diddley" on Season 4, Episode 4 ("Una Venta") of AMC's Sons of Anarchy.

In 2016, original drummer Julien Peterson left the band to pursue other interests; he was replaced by multi-instrumentalist Eric Bohlke of Austin's Khali Haat in the spring of 2017.

Bohlke appears as Churchwood's drummer on three recordings: Plenty Wrong to Go Awry, The Boule Oui, and Johns 2:22. Bohlke further lent his talents to Churchwood by recording and mixing the latter two of the above-mentioned records in his home sound studio in Austin.

Churchwood's future became uncertain if not imminently foreshortened when guitarist and founder Bill Anderson announced that he was moving from Austin to New Mexico in the spring of 2021.

Saustex Records billed a show at Austin's Sagebrush on November 11, 2023 as Churchwood's "Last Sermon."

However, an article by the late Michael Corcoran in March 2024 has Churchwood currently on hiatus" and teasing a possible return with an album of unreleased songs by Ballad Shambles, a 1980s project that featured the earliest incarnation of the Anderson-Doerr songwriting partnership.

== Discography ==
- Churchwood (Saustex, 2011)
- Just the Two of Us (Saustex, 2012)
- Sample This: Saustex 2012 Sampler (Saustex, 2012)
- 2 (Saustex, 2013)
- The Saustex Variations (Saustex, 2014)
- 3: Trickgnosis (Saustex, 2014)
- Hex City (Saustex, 2016)
- Plenty Wrong To Go Awry (Saustex, 2020)
- The Boule Oui (Saustex, 2022)
- Johns 2:22 (Saustex, 2023)
