= International Orange! =

Studio album by Firewater
- Released: September 11, 2012
- Genre: Indie rock
- Length: 46:18
- Label: Bloodshot
- Producer: Tod Ashley

Firewater chronology
The Golden Hour (2008)	International Orange! (2012)

Professional ratings
Review scores
Source	Rating
AllMusic	4/5 stars
Robert Christgau	(2-star Honorable Mention)
PopMatters	(4/10)

International Orange! is the seventh studio album by the alternative rock band Firewater (their sixth album of original songs), released on September 11, 2012, through Bloodshot Records. It was recorded in Istanbul.

== Track listing ==
All tracks are written by Tod Ashley.

No.	Title	Length
1.	"A Little Revolution"	3:31
2.	"Glitter Days"	5:04
3.	"Dead Man's Boots"	3:54
4.	"Up from the Underground"	3:21
5.	"The Monkey Song"	4:09
6.	"Ex-Millionaire Mambo"	3:58
7.	"Feeling No Pain"	4:44
8.	"Strange Life"	4:11
9.	"Nowhere to Be Found"	4:34
10.	"Tropical Depression"	3:57
11.	"The Bonney Anne"	4:55

== Charts ==
Chart (2012)	Peak position
US Top Heatseekers	34

== Personnel ==
Firewater

- Tod Ashley – vocals, electric guitar, melodica, bongos, loops, arrangement, production, photography, design
- Yonadav Halevy – drums, percussion
- Stefano Iascone – trumpet
- Çosar Kamçı – darbuka, daf
- Uri Brauner Kinrot – electric guitar
- Massimo Piredda – trombone
- Adam Scheflan – bass guitar

Additional musicians and production

- John Dent – mastering
- Johnny Kalsi – dhol and loops on "The Monkey Song"
- Tamir Muskat – mixing, production and drums on "A Little Revolution", percussion on "Glitter Days" and "Strange Life"
- Marco Pampaluna – horn arrangement on "Glitter Days" and "The Monkey Song"
- Ferdi Seçkin – zurna on "Glitter Days" and "Strange Life"
- Nimrod Talmon – trombone on "A Little Revolution" and "Dead Man's Boots", melodica on "Nowhere to Be Found"
- Itamar Ziegler – bass guitar on "A Little Revolution"
