= Tod Ashley =

American musician

Tod A.
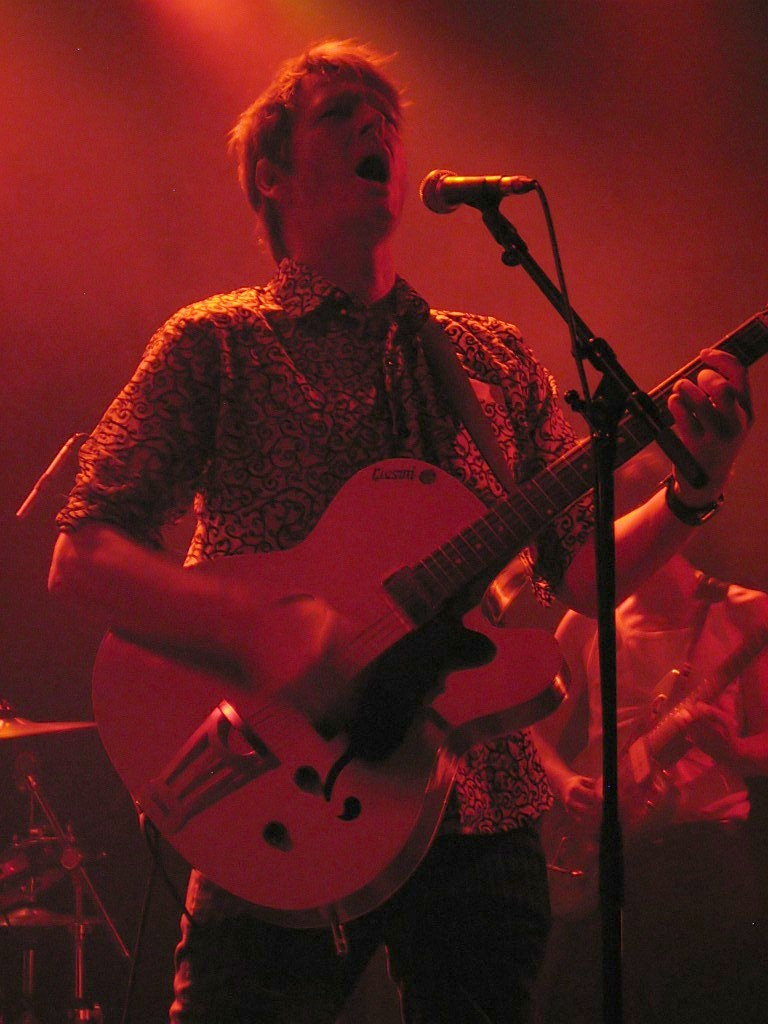
- Ashley performing in 2008

Background information
- Born: Tod Ashley; November 30, 1965 (age 60); Greenville, South Carolina, U.S.
- Instruments: Vocals, bass guitar
- Years active: 1987–present
- Labels: Bloodshot Records; Noisolution Records
- Member of: Firewater
- Formerly of: Cop Shoot Cop

Tod Ashley (born November 30, 1965), better known by the stage name Tod A, is an American singer, songwriter, and bass guitarist. He founded the rock music groups Cop Shoot Cop and Firewater.

Ashley also spent time while in art school in a band called Shithäus with Jon Spencer, later of The Blues Explosion.

Ashley was living in Bushwick, Brooklyn when he decided that he wanted to travel the world. In 2005, putting his musical career on hiatus, Tod spent most of the year traveling the Far East, including Calcutta, India and Bangkok, Thailand. He has published a written account of his travels in a blog, which he calls Postcards From the Other Side of the World. He lived in Bali for three years until 2010.

In 2019, Ashley published his first novel, Banging the Monkey, based on his experiences abroad.

== Discography ==
Cop Shoot Cop

Year	Name	Ref
1990	Consumer Revolt	
1991	White Noise	
1993	Ask Questions Later	
1994	Release	

Firewater

Year	Name	Ref
1996	Get Off the Cross, We Need the Wood for the Fire	
1998	The Ponzi Scheme	
2001	Psychopharmacology	
2003	The Man on the Burning Tightrope	
2004	Songs We Should Have Written	
2008	The Golden Hour	
2012	International Orange!	

Other appearances

Year	Name	Artist	Ref
1985	Crush: Live Crush 84–85	Shithaus	
1994	Forces You Don't Understand	Lubricated Goat	
1995	Gash	Foetus	
1996	Null/Void	Foetus	
1997	Red Expendables	Red Expendables	
2002	Obtanium	Skeleton Key	
2010	Combat Disco Casbah	Figli di Madre Ignota	
2010	Gecekondu	Baba Zula	
