= Ten Benson =

British rock band

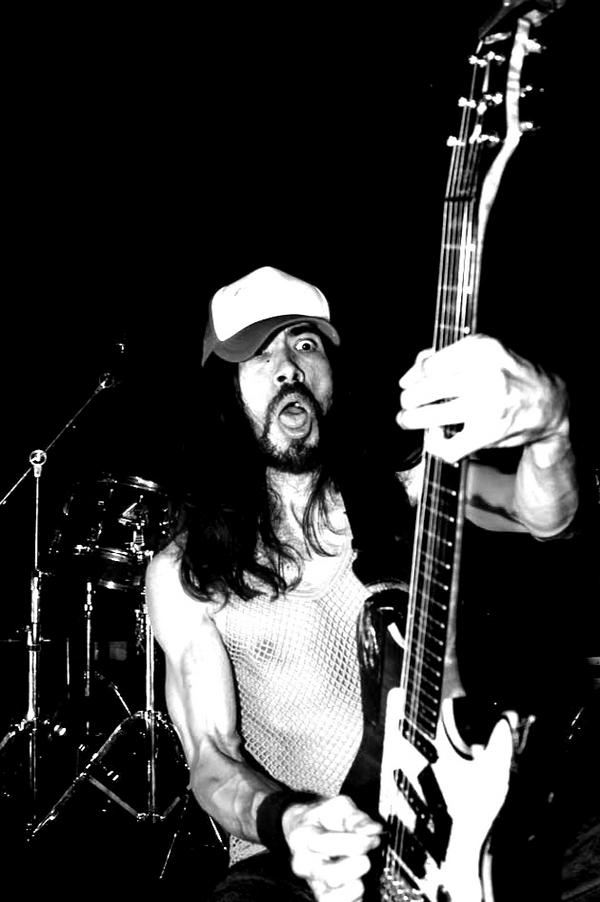
- Live at The Garage, Holloway, London, 2003

Background information
- Origin: London, England
- Genres: Alternative rock, heavy metal, comedy rock, swamp rock
- Years active: 1997–2004; 2006–present
- Labels: Sweet, Deceptive, Cottage, Art Rocker, Jetset
- Members: Chris Teckkam: Vox & Guitar; Karl Hussey: Drums; Jaemi Zahra-Hall: Lead Guitar; Mush Berrier: Bass Guitar
- Past members: Marc Sallis - Guitar; Steve Crittall - Lead Guitar; Dan Warren - Drums; Dave Attwood - Drums; Glenn Fryatt - Drums; Paul Summer - Guitar; Andy Zammit - Drums; Jonny Wood - Keyboard; Mathis Stadlbauer - Bass; Ritchie Glover - Bass; Ian Hutchinson - Guitar/Bass; Duncan Lovatt - Vox/Guitar; Napoleon Catilo - Drums; Bruce Brand - Drums
- Website: http://www.tenbenson.com

Ten Benson are a rock band from London, United Kingdom formed in 1997. Their early releases saw them described as "psychedelic hillbillies", but they later moved on to a (cod-)heavy metal sound.

== History ==
The band was formed in 1997 by ex-Swimmer singer/guitarist Chris Teckkam, with Shiva Affect drummer Napoleon Catilo, and bassist Duncan Lovatt. Jonny Wood came in for live shows on keyboard and general crazy shenanigans etc. Three 7" singles were released in 1997 and 1998, the latter ("Evil Heat") getting considerable airplay on BBC Radio 1. These singles were compiled onto the 6 Fingers of Benson mini-album on Deceptive Records. The United Colors of Benson EP followed in November 1998, these early release seeing them described as a "geeky gaggle of quirk-rock experimentalists".

The band recorded two sessions for John Peel's show, in 1998, and 2000. "The Claw" reached No. 4 in the 1998 Festive 50, "Evil Heat" also making the chart at No. 47.

Their next release, "Rock Cottage" saw them spoofing Heavy Metal. First album proper, Hiss followed in 2000. Next album was 2002's Satan Kidney Pie. The United States debut album Benson Burner was released in 2003 on Jetset Records, and was described in one review as "ZZ Top in bed with The Strokes -- infectious hooks with primal leanings" and gaining comparisons with Tenacious D in another. Village Voice compared the band to Nantucket, and described them as "foreigners with bad hick accents growling, 'Mmmmmmm, hot sausage!'". A 2003 Drowned In Sound live review described them as an "inbred family of redneck truckers resplendent in mesh caps and string vests and hirsute faces". Danger of Deaf was also issued in 2003.

After a two and a half-year sabbatical, the band returned in late 2006. Their live shows sometimes include unreleased songs "Third Eye" and "500 Miles". They recorded BBC Radio 6 Music sessions on Marc Riley's show on 2 October 2013, when Mike Joyce (ex Smiths drummer) stood in as the DJ, and on 6 October 2015. Ten Benson continue to play live, albeit seldom.

== Discography ==
=== Singles ===
- "City Hoppers" (1997, Sweet)
- "The Claw" (1998, Sweet)
- "Evil Heat" (1998, Deceptive)
- United Colors of Benson EP (1998, Deceptive)
- "Rock Cottage" (1999, Cottage)
- "Robot Tourist" (February 2000, Cottage) UK No. 82
- "I Don't Buy It" (July 2000, Cottage) UK No. 121
- "Black Snow" (December 2000, Cottage) UK No. 127
- "One Way Ticket" (August 2007, Artrocker)
- "Mud Man" (September 2015, Ditto Music)
- ”Snowman Snowgirl” (December 2015, Ditto Music)
- ”Half an Hour from Hell” (December 2021)
- ”500 Miles” (December 2021)
- ”Almost Human” (February 2022)

=== EPs ===
- 6 Fingers of Benson - a collection of their first three singles (June 1998, Deceptive)

=== Albums ===
- Hiss (March 2000, Cottage)
- Satan Kidney Pie (2002, Artrocker)
- Danger of Deaf (May 2003, Must Destroy)
- Benson Burner (August 2003, Jetset)
