= Country Love Songs =

Studio album by Robbie Fulks
- Released: 1996
- Genres: Country, alternative country
- Length: 38:14
- Label: Bloodshot

Robbie Fulks chronology
Country Love Songs (1996)	South Mouth (1997)

Country Love Songs is the debut album by the American country and alternative country singer-songwriter Robbie Fulks, released in 1996.

== Reception ==
Professional ratings
Review scores
Source	Rating
AllMusic	4/5 stars
Robert Christgau	(1-star Honorable Mention)

Writing for AllMusic, Jack Leaver referred to Fulks as "cleverly twisted, deliciously irreverent, and one of the best of the new country singer/songwriters" and wrote of the album: "Musically, Country Love Songs supplies plenty of hardcore, bottle-tippin', honky tonk country, with a '50s production that sounds like it's supposed to be there. Fulks writes and sings country music that bears little or no resemblance to what dominates the airwaves; rather, his material harks back to an era when humor and dark subject matter shared the same page of a writer's composition book." In a story for No Depression prior to the release of the album, Kevin Roe wrote: "Country Love Songs touches all of the right traditional country bases in showcasing Fulks’ knack for memorable melodies and gleefully left-of-center lyrics."

== Track listing ==
All song by Robbie Fulks unless otherwise noted.

1. "Every Kind of Music But Country" (Tim Carroll) – 2:18
2. "Rock Bottom, Pop. 1" (Fulks, Dallas Wayne) – 2:38
3. "The Buck Starts Here" – 3:42
4. "(I Love) Nickels and Dimes" – 3:05
5. "Barely Human" – 3:45
6. "I'd Be Lonesome" – 2:44
7. "She Took a Lot of Pills (And Died)" – 2:41
8. "We'll Burn Together" – 2:50
9. "Let's Live Together" – 2:59
10. "The Scrapple Song" – 2:42
11. "Pete Way's Trousers" – 2:34
12. "Tears Only Run One Way" – 2:49
13. "Papa Was a Steel-Headed Man" – 3:27

== Personnel ==
- Robbie Fulks – vocals, guitar
- Keith Baumann – lap steel guitar
- Tom Brumley – pedal steel
- Casey Driessen – fiddle
- Lou Whitney – bass
- Darren Wilcox – bass
- Brett Simons – bass
- Bobby Lloyd Hicks – drums
- Ora Jones – vocals
- Steve Rosen – fiddle, background vocals
- The Skeletons – background vocals
- Joe Terry – keyboards, piano
- D. Clinton Thompson – guitar

Production

- Greg Duffin – engineer
- Steve Albini – engineer
- John Golden – mastering
- Markus Greiner – design
- Elaine Moore – photography
