= Upland Stories =

Studio album by Robbie Fulks
- Released: April 1, 2016
- Genre: Alternative country
- Length: 45:56
- Label: Bloodshot
- Producer: Steve Albini

Robbie Fulks chronology
Jura (2015)	Upland Stories (2016)

Upland Stories is an album by American country musician Robbie Fulks, released on April 1, 2016 on Bloodshot Records. It was produced by Steve Albini. Upland Stories was nominated for a Grammy for Best Folk Album and the song "Alabama at Night" was nominated for a Grammy for Best American Roots Song.

== Critical reception ==
Professional ratings
Aggregate scores
Source	Rating
Metacritic	87/100
Review scores
Source	Rating
AllMusic	4/5 stars
American Songwriter	3/5 stars
Exclaim!	9/10
Mojo	4/5 stars
Nash Country Weekly	A
Paste	9.1/10
PopMatters	8/10
Spin	8/10
Uncut	8/10
Vice	A

Upland Stories received generally favorable reviews from critics; on Metacritic, it has a score of 87 out of 100, indicating "universal acclaim". One such review was written by Bob Paxman for Nash Country Weekly. In his review, Paxman wrote that Fulks had "reached his highest plateau" with Upland Stories, and concluded by calling it "a masterful album, replete with wonderful stories and fully drawn characters."

== Track listing ==
All tracks are written by Robbie Fulks, except where noted.

No.	Title	Writer(s)	Length
1.	"Alabama at Night"
2.	"Baby Rocked Her Dolly"	Merle Kilgore
3.	"Never Come Home"
4.	"Sarah Jane"
5.	"Aunt Peg's New Old Man"
6.	"Needed"
7.	"South Bend Soldiers On"
8.	"America Is a Hard Religion"
9.	"A Miracle"
10.	"Sweet as Sweet Comes"
11.	"Katy Kay"
12.	"Fare Thee Well, Carolina Gals"

== Personnel ==
- Steve Albini – engineering, mixing
- Shad Cobb – banjo, fiddle, vocals
- Jim DeMain – mastering
- Robbie Fulks – banjo, guitar, production, vocals
- Robbie Gjersoe – baritone guitar, electric guitar, resonator guitar, ukulele, viola
- Andy Goodwin – cover photograph, photography
- Markus Greiner – layout
- Alex Hall – drums
- Jim Herrington – photography
- Wayne Horvitz – organ, Wurlitzer
- Fats Kaplin – mandolin, pedal steel
- Todd Phillips – bass
- Jenny Scheinman – fiddle, vocals
- Grégoire Yeche – assistant
