= Jean-Louis Murat =

French musician (1952–2023)

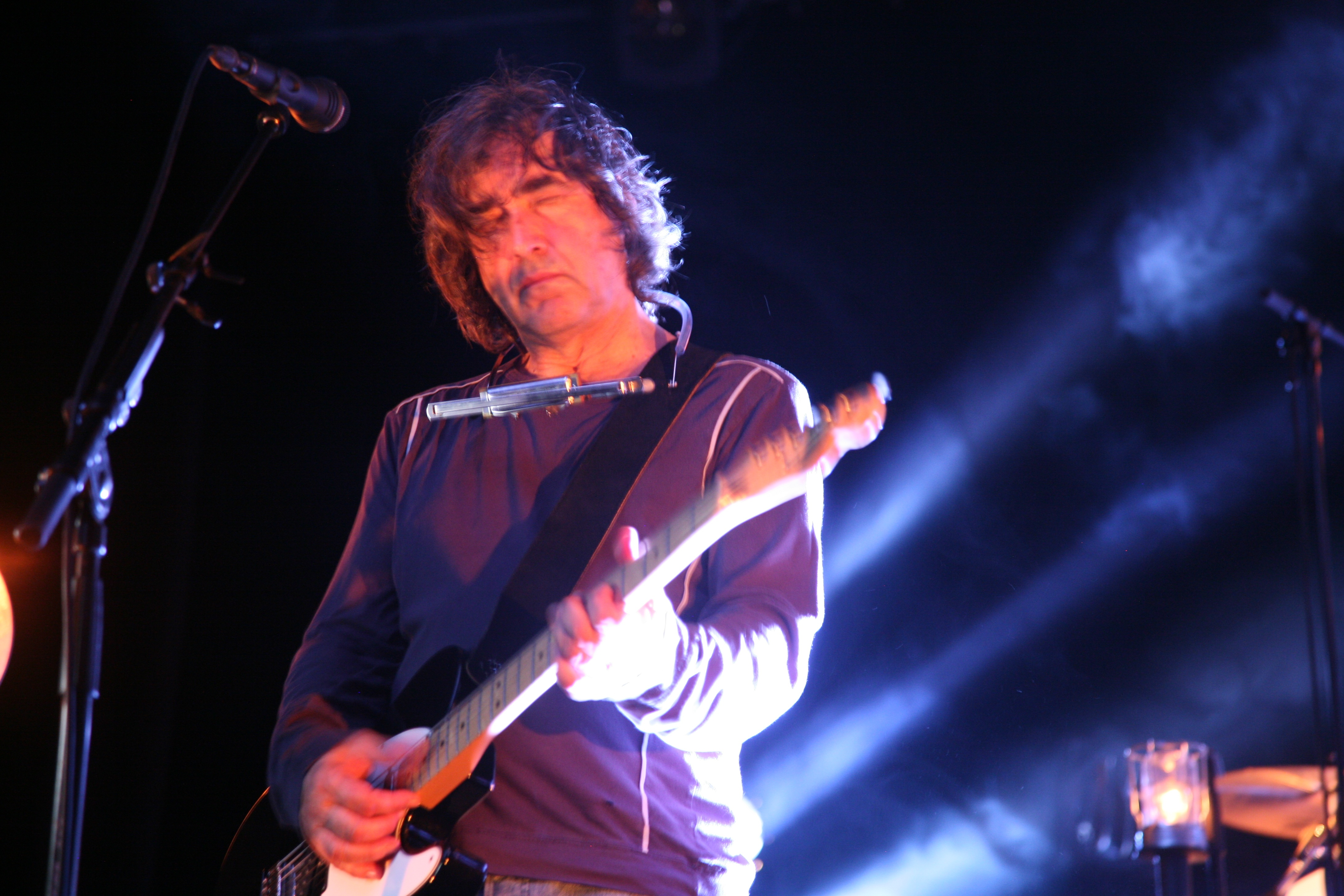
- Murat in 2010

Background information
- Born: Jean-Louis Bergheaud; 28 January 1952; Chamalières, France
- Died: 25 May 2023 (aged 71) Orcival, France
- Genres: Pop rock; new wave
- Occupation: Musician
- Instruments: Guitar; vocals
- Years active: 1980–2023
- Label: Virgin/EMI Records

Jean-Louis Bergheaud, better known by the stage name Jean-Louis Murat (French: [ʒɑ̃lwi myʁa]; 28 January 1952 – 25 May 2023), was a French musician.

== Life ==
Jean-Louis Bergheaud was born in Chamalières, France to a father who was a carpenter and a non-professional musician. Further to his parents' divorce, he spent his whole youth in the isolated farm of his grandparents in Murat-le-Quaire, a village overviewing the thermal city of La Bourboule, whose name which he would later chose as his pseudonym. From his earliest days, solitary and introverted, Jean-Louis Murat showed he was gifted in music and with many instruments, which will lead him to the local wind section at the age of 7 with his father, then to the conservatory brass class where he will improve his talent for singing too. At the same time at 15, his English teacher let him discover soul and jazz music and he met several blues artists such as John Lee Hooker, T-Bone Walker or Memphis Slim. Thanks to his English teacher, he continued studying against his father's advice. Keen on poetry as well as romantic and upheaval literature amongst others, Oscar Wilde, André Gide, D. H. Lawrence and Vladimir Nabokov, he was the first member of his family to pass the Baccalauréat. Married at the age of 17, he joined the University of Clermont-Ferrand for a short period of time; he had a son and divorced when he was 19 and left in order to travel, living by doing odd jobs in France and around Europe all by himself, in the style of Jack Kerouac. He held a couple of positions between Paris and several French tourist spots; he was ski instructor in Avoriaz and a beach attendant in Saint-Tropez, and he finally went back to his village in 1977 at the age of 23 and devoted himself to music.

=== Difficult beginnings ===
With some Clermontois' friends from Clermont-Ferrand, he created a rock band called "Clara" with him as lead singer and songwriter. He also played saxophone and guitar in the band. William Sheller noticed them and invited them to do a couple of his opening acts and then employed them as musicians for a while. The band split and thanks to Sheller, Jean-Louis Berghaud at the age of 27, in 1981 (under the name of "Murat", simply), recorded a 45 rpm record including 3 songs, called "Suicidez-vous, le peuple est mort" with Pathé Marconi EMI, with Jean-Baptiste Mondino's photo as cover of the sleeve; critiques were positive but the sales did not take off. The French radio station Europe 1 censored the song since a girl was said to commit suicide because of it. A mini eponymous album followed in 1982 including six songs, under the name of Murat and an album in 1984 called Passions Privées garnered very low sales (2,000 copies), and after a tour with Charlélie Couture, his record label withdrew the contract. At the time he was around thirty.

=== Growing success ===
In 1985, Jean-Louis Murat did some recording with CBS but none of the discs came out, then the year after, he jumped on the opportunity to record at Virgin Records and in 1988, the 45 rpm record Si je devais manquer de toi came out. This one met with some success, allowing the singer to start being recognized at last. His success was confirmed by the sales of his new album which came out in 1989, called Cheyenne Autumn. It was recorded in London and included other singles which were also successful (L'Ange Déchu; Te Garder Près de Moi).

This beginning of fame brought him to be noticed by the movie industry, so Jean-Louis Murat appeared in 1990 as an actor in a film by Jacques Doillon who offered him a role in La vengeance d’une femme with Isabelle Huppert and Béatrice Dalle. But what made him definitely known in the eyes of a wider public is the single "Regrets" (in duet with Mylène Farmer) in 1991 (No. 3 in Top 50 and more than 300,000 copies sold), while he was turning 40. At that same time, his new studio album came out, Le Manteau de Pluie. His titles Col de la Croix-Morand and Sentiment Nouveau met with a great success; Sentiment nouveau entered the top 50 position in the early 1992. Since then, his albums have regularly been into the French Top 20.

Jean-Louis Murat lived in the Auvergne, a region that frequently featured in his songwriting and musical themes. Over the course of his career, he recorded and released numerous albums including Vénus (1993) and Dolorès (1996). Many of his albums were followed by concert tours, some of which resulted in live recordings such as Murat Live (1995), Live in Dolores (1966) and Muragostang (2000). Murat often worked with family members on his musical projects and tours.

In 1996, he was involved in the film Mademoiselle personne, directed by Pascal Bailly and starring Elodie Bouchez and Romain Duris. Murat composed the soundtrack and contributed to the development of the project. The film received a limited theatrical release.

In March 2013 his album Toboggan came out and in October 2014, the follow-up album called Babel came out, recorded with Delano Orchestra band.

Interested in Buddhism, Murat got involved in the Tibetan cause.

=== Death ===
Murat died on 25 May 2023, at the age of 71.

== Discography ==
(For peak positions of albums and singles, refer to )

=== Albums ===
- 1981: Suicidez-vous, le peuple est mort !
- 1982: Murat
- 1984: Passions privées
- 1989: Cheyenne autumn
- 1991: Murat en plein air
- 1991: Le Manteau de pluie
- 1991: Murat 82...84
- 1993: Vénus
- 1994: Face Nord
- 1995: Mademoiselle Personne
- 1995: Murat Live
- 1996: Dolorès
- 1998: Live in Dolorès
- 1999: Mustango
- 2000: Muragostang
- 2001: Madame Deshoulières (in collaboration with Isabelle Huppert)
- 2002: Le Moujik et sa femme
- 2003: Lilith
- 2004: A bird on a poire (in collaboration with Jennifer Charles, and Fred Jimenez)
- 2005: Moscou (Москва)
- 2005: 1829
- 2006: Taormina
- 2007: Charles et Léo (poems by Charles Baudelaire set to music by Léo Ferré)
- 2008: Tristan
- 2009: Le Cours ordinaire des choses
- 2011: Grand lièvre
- 2013: Toboggan
- 2014: Babel (in collaboration with the Delano Orchestra)
- 2016: Morituri
- 2017: Travaux sur la N89
- 2018: Il francese
- 2019: Innamorato
- 2020: Baby Love
- 2021: La Vraie Vie De Buck John

=== EPs ===
- Sentiment nouveau... (1991, 5 tracks)
- Au Mont Sans-Soucis (2000 5 tracks)
- Polly Jean (2000 8 tracks)
- L'au-delà (2002 4 tracks)
- Le Cri du Papillon (2003 4 tracks)
- Mashpotétisés (2004 4 tracks)
- Live aux PIAS Nites (2015 5 tracks)
