= Firewater (band) =

US indie band founded by Tod A.

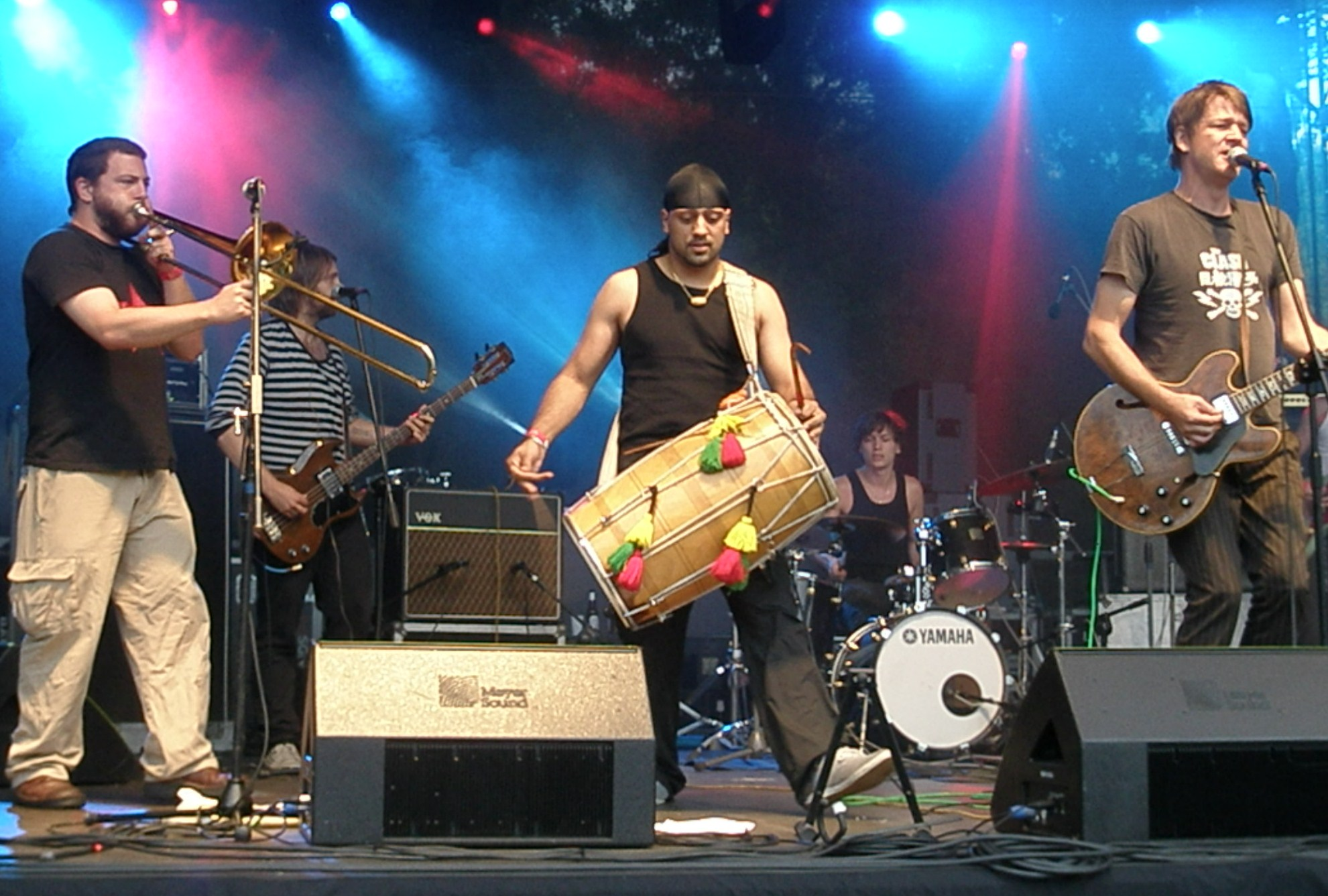
- Firewater performing at Globaltica World Culture Festival in Gdynia, Poland

Background information
- Origin: New York City
- Genres: Alternative rock, gypsy punk, klezmer, cabaret, ska, jazz
- Labels: Bloodshot Records, Noisolution Records

Firewater is an American band founded by American singer/instrumentalist Tod A. in New York City in 1995, after the breakup of his previous group Cop Shoot Cop. A self-described "world punk" band, Firewater incorporate diverse elements of world music with punk rock rhythms, including cabaret, ska, jazz, folk and most notably Eastern European influences such as klezmer and gypsy music, which has led to their inclusion in the gypsy punk genre.

By 2012, Firewater had released seven studio albums and seen some success, particularly in Europe and on United States college radio stations.

== Biography ==
After Tod left his previous group, Cop Shoot Cop, he quickly regrouped and formed Firewater to explore the styles of music Cop Shoot Cop had only hinted at, including klezmer, gypsy, jazz, and ska forms. Labeled a musical collective, Tod has remained Firewater's only consistent member, acting as singer-songwriter and bassist/guitarist. Throughout their fluctuating line-up, the band has occasionally featured numerous notable musicians, including Duane Denison of the Jesus Lizard, Yuval Gabay of Soul Coughing, David Ouimet of Motherhead Bug and Foetus, Jennifer Charles of Elysian Fields, Hahn Rowe, Tamir Muskat and Oren Kaplan of Gogol Bordello and Ori Kaplan of Balkan Beat Box.

Their album Songs We Should Have Written (2004) is a collection of cover songs. It includes songs written by Robyn Hitchcock, The Rolling Stones ("Paint It Black" reinterpreted as a crawlingly slow raga which "shove(s) a few downers down the song's throat to counter the original version's adrenaline-fueled fire"), and a "dark and sweet" take of Sonny and Cher's "The Beat Goes On", described as "10 times more ominous and 20 times more pleasurable" than the original. The album also includes a modern rendition of the Johnny Cash anthem "Folsom Prison Blues".

After recording Songs We Should Have Written, singer Tod A took a three-year sabbatical, traveling through Thailand, India, Pakistan, Turkey and Indonesia and chronicling his experiences on his blog "Postcards from the Other Side of the World." During this time, he wrote and recorded the band's sixth studio album, The Golden Hour, with the help of various local musicians and friends, including Firewater producer Tamir Muskat. The record was released May 6, 2008, through Bloodshot Records in the US and Noise-o-lution in Europe. Firewater's seventh studio album, International Orange!, was released in September 2012, accompanied by international touring.

== Discography ==
- Get Off the Cross, We Need the Wood for the Fire (1996) – Jetset
- The Ponzi Scheme (1998) – Uptown/Universal
- Psychopharmacology (2001) – Jetset
- The Man on the Burning Tightrope (2003) – Jetset
- Songs We Should Have Written (2004) – Jetset
- The Golden Hour (2008) – Bloodshot
- International Orange! (2012) – Bloodshot
- Life During Wartime (2026, Single/Cover) – Pravda

Album appearances

- Live at KEXP Vol.5- "Electric City" (2009)
