= Jennifer Charles =

American singer

Background information
- Born: Washington D.C., U.S.
- Genres: Art rock; jazz; alternative rock; avant-garde; world; dream pop; trip hop
- Occupations: Singer, songwriter
- Instruments: Vocals, guitar, Wurlitzer
- Years active: 1990–present
- Member of: Elysian Fields, Lovage, La Mar Enfortuna

Jennifer Asher Charles is an American singer and songwriter. Along with Oren Bloedow, she co-founded the New York band Elysian Fields.

== Early life ==
Charles was born on November 15 in Washington, D.C. Her mother had been a torch singer and her father was a jazz DJ. She was raised by her mother in a house shared by another single mother and their children. She spent many nights of her childhood listening to pop songs on a portable radio, and at age 10 won an award for her poem "Riddle Song of the Sun".

As young children, she and her brothers would travel door to door, performing a kind of children's vaudeville act, singing Tin Pan Alley songs and tap dancing. Charles was a shy girl, so when she started doing children's theater at age 10, her stage debut at Trinity Theater was that of a cat who had no speaking lines but was a mime and dancer who was onstage the length of the play. It was an original role that the director let Charles create as she felt she did not fit into any of the written parts. At age 11, she started a newspaper with her best friend called The Pre-Teen Times where they sold subscriptions that came out quarterly. At age 12, she became passionate about the music of South Asia after her mother returned from a journey across India and Nepal with a bag full of cassettes for her, with Jagjit and Chitra Singh's The Gold Disc being her favorite. She took flamenco lessons as a young teen, and continued to do children's theater and community theater. She studied acting for a summer at Catholic University, and had principal roles in productions at Little Theatre of Alexandria, Olney Theatre Center, and Folger Shakespeare Theatre. She attended the Washington International School, where she studied Spanish and Latin, then the Edmund Burke School, a college prep school she left after she had begun working in professional theatre at Studio Theatre and Source Theatre, and the school could not accommodate her rehearsal schedule. For her last two years of high school, Charles attended Duke Ellington School of the Arts, where she was a theater major. An advanced academic program also landed her part-time at George Washington University, where she studied writing and anthropology.

Charles's youth in the melting pot of Washington, D.C. was instrumental in her music influence and taste. Her mother had season tickets to the National Symphony Orchestra, which they attended on Friday nights, and her father would take her to hear live jazz at places like Blues Alley, One Step Down, and Charlie's Georgetown, where she saw the likes of Anita O'Day, Mel Tormé, Dizzy Gillespie, Ahmad Jamal, Oscar Peterson, George Shearing, and Jamaican jazz pianist Monty Alexander. In her teens, Charles would often travel to New York and London, both with friends and on her own. She was turned on to the different sounds in each city - The Lounge Lizards, Diamanda Galas, Lydia Lunch, Blondie, and The Velvet Underground in New York; and The Specials, Gang of Four, Siouxsie, The Slits, The Buzzcocks, The Birthday Party, Cocteau Twins, and The Fall in the UK. But she was also steeped in the contemporary scenes of her own hometown, dancing at Tracks, Poseurs, and Badlands, and frequenting live music venues like D.C. Space, 9:30 Club, Fort Reno Park, and Cafe Lautrec to see punk bands like Bad Brains, Beefeater, and Rites of Spring. She also grew up going to go-go concerts, seeing Chuck Brown, Trouble Funk, Junk Yard Band, E.U., and Rare Essence, and went to hear Ethiopian music in the clubs and restaurants of DC's Adams Morgan neighborhood. As a junior in high school, Charles moved out on her own and supported herself with theater work and various odd jobs, including as an artist model at the Corcoran School of the Arts and as a singing waitress in a piano bar called The Top Hat Club.

== Career ==
In 1987, she moved to New York to continue her theatre and academic studies, receiving her Bachelor of Fine Arts from NYU's Tisch school in just three years. Upon graduating she appeared in various off-broadway theater productions, had a stint singing in a dive piano bar and curated a performance/poetry series at the original Knitting Factory.

Elysian Fields was founded in 1995 and have released eleven full-length records (including one produced by Steve Albini that was shelved). They have also contributed to many compilation albums, including the first song on John Zorn's Serge Gainsbourg tribute album. This song, their rendition of "Les Amours Perdues", also appeared in Lea Pool's film Emporte Moi.

Besides Elysian Fields, Charles has other projects. She and Bloedow recorded La Mar Enfortuna for Zorn's Tzadik label, featuring renditions of Sephardic and Ladino songs. She has studied classical Indian singing with teacher Gulamji.

In late 2007, she and Bloedow put out a second Tzadik full-length, under the band name La Mar Enfortuna, called "Conviviencia". Charles sings in five languages on the record, including Ladino, Spanish, Aramaic, Arabic, and Greek.

Charles also makes up a quarter of the band Lovage, along with Dan the Automator, Mike Patton and Kid Koala. The band recorded its debut album titled Music to Make Love to Your Old Lady By in 2001. Charles co-wrote and sang most of the material on the album. She has also worked with bands like Firewater, turning in performances on "The Circus" and "Mr. Cardiac" from 1996's Get Off the Cross, We Need the Wood for the Fire, as well as Xian Hawkin's "Sybarite", the Foetus record, Love, as well as working with Matt Johnson of The The, and on several of John Zorn's records.

Charles recorded in French with the French composer Jean-Louis Murat for the album A bird on a poire in 2004, which was nominated for a Victoires de la Musique award in the category Best Pop or Rock Album.

She had a guest spot on ex-Nine Inch Nails drummer Chris Vrenna's solo project Tweaker. She sang and co-composed the track "Crude Sunlight", which appeared on the 2004 album 2 a.m. Wakeup Call.

For the 2001 film Tangled, Charles co-wrote two songs with Reinhold Heil and Johnny Klimek, "I Will" and "Alan's Photo Shoot", which she also performed. The film also features Elysian Fields' "Bend Your Mind" and their cover of Bob Dylan's "Tangled up in Blue" over the end credits.

She produced the latest Oren Bloedow solo record She Goes With me to a Blossom World, which came out in 2008.

Charles was back on stage in 2008 in the Off Broadway production "Lightning at Our Feet", inspired by poet Emily Dickinson, under the direction of Obie winner Bob McGrath, with film maker Bill Morrison and composer Michael Gordon, which was part of the Next Wave festival at Brooklyn Academy of Music in December 2008, where she sang and acted, channeling the iconic 19th century poet.

== Discography ==
=== With La Mar Enfortuna ===
- La Mar Enfortuna (2001)
- Convivencia (2007)

=== With Lovage ===
- Music to Make Love to Your Old Lady By (2001)

=== With Parthenope / Bohemian Flesh ===
- Bohemian Flesh (2023)
- Introducing... Parthenope (2020)

=== Selected guest appearances ===
- Oren Bloedow – Oren Bloedow (1992)
- Firewater – Get Off the Cross, We Need the Wood for the Fire (1996)
- Live – Secret Samadhi (1997)
- Oren Bloedow – The Luckiest Boy in the World (1998)
- What's the Word Volume 1 (1999)
- DJ Logic – Project Logic (1999)
- Jean-Louis Murat – Mustango (1999)
- illy B Eats – Drop the Needle (2001)
- Zoar – Clouds Without Water (2001)
- Firewater – Psychopharmacology (2001)
- Frank London – Scientist at Work (2002)
- John Zorn – Filmworks XII: Three Documentaries (2002)
- John Zorn – IAO (2002)
- Sybarite – "Scene of the Crime" (2002)
- Ben Perowsky – Camp Songs (2003)
- Tweaker – 2 a.m. Wakeup Call (2004)
- Jean-Louis Murat with Fred Jimenez & Jennifer Charles – A Bird on a Poire (2004)
- Foetus – Love (2005)
- Ben Perowsky's Moodswing Orchestra – Ben Perowsky's Moodswing Orchestra (2006)
- Wax Tailor – "Heart Stop" (2012)
- Tredici Bacci – Amore Per Tutti (2016), "Drowned"
- Dan the Automator as Nathaniel Merriweather – "Summer Lovin'" (2017)
- DJ Criminal – The Smuggler's Candle (2022)
- Wax Tailor – Fishing for Accidents (2023)

=== Writing and production credits ===
- Bebel Gilberto – Agora (2000), writer of "Bolero" and "Yet Another Love Song"
- Oren Bloedow – She Goes With Me to a Blossom World (2008), producer
