= The Blacks (band) =

Background information
- Origin: Chicago, IL
- Genres: insurgent country
- Years active: 1993–2000, 2006, 2010
- Label: Bloodshot Records
- Members: Danny Black, Gina Black, James Emmenegger, Nora O'Connor

The Blacks (originally called 'The Black Family') were an insurgent country band from Chicago, IL. They released two albums through Bloodshot Records.

== Career ==
The group formed when Danny Black (then called Danny McDonough) met Gina Black. Danny had previously played with a psychedelic hard rock band called 'Cornmother'. The band made its first live performance in 1995. They signed to Bloodshot Records two years later and released their first album, Dolly Horrorshow, in 1998. After one more album, Just Like Home in 2000, the group disbanded.

In 2006, the band reunited for a concert at the "Taste of Randolph" in Chicago.

In 2010, the band reunited to record the 6-song In Sickness and Health digital download EP.

== Discography ==
=== Albums ===
- Dolly Horrorshow (1998, Bloodshot Records)
- Just Like Home (2000, Bloodshot)

=== EPs ===
- In Sickness and Health (2010, 6-song digital download, Bloodshot)

=== Compilation appearances ===
- "The New World" on Poor Little Knitter on the Road
- "Why Drunky?" on Down to the Promised Land
- "Poncho's Lament" on "New Coat of Paint" - Tom Waits tribute album
- "Fake Out Jesus" (covered by The Great Crusaders) on "While No One Was Looking: Toasting 20 Years of Bloodshot Records" (Bloodshot)

== Reception ==
- "Talk about first impressions. The Blacks grab the audience's attention just by walking onstage -- part hillbilly punk band, part cabaret troupe from Berlin's red-light district. With her false eyelashes, form-fitting party dress and pair of nymphs painted on the body of her upright bass, the statuesque Gina Black alone would be enough to stop traffic on Lake Shore Drive." (Greg Kot, Chicago Tribune, 1999)
- "These are the Blacks, and they are one of the finest rock & roll bands you'll hear this year." (Steve Pick, Riverfront Times, 1999)
- "The Blacks, a Chicago trio with a penchant for fabulously queasy love songs, know how to make an entrance. Once the statuesque Gina Black took the stage at a local club in a dominatrix get-up. Leashed to her was bandmate Danny Black, dressed as a dog-collared Madison Avenue executive. It was arguably the most elaborate of the Blacks' sartorial pranks, but one that probably won't be soon repeated." (Greg Kot, Chicago Tribune, 2000)
- "While making two albums for Bloodshot Records — "Dolly Horrorshow" (1998) and " Just Like Home" (2000) — the quartet created a sound and put on a show like nobody else, a cocktail of hillbilly punk, garage rock, red-light-district blues and cabaret, a dash of glam swagger and sensuality, and killer harmonies." (Greg Kot, Chicago Tribune, 2010)

== Members ==
- Danny Black (Danny McDonough) — vocals, guitar, trumpet
- Gina Black — standup bass, vocals, harmonica
- Nora O'Connor — guitar, vocals
- James Emmenegger — drums
