= Robbie Fulks =

American singer-songwriter

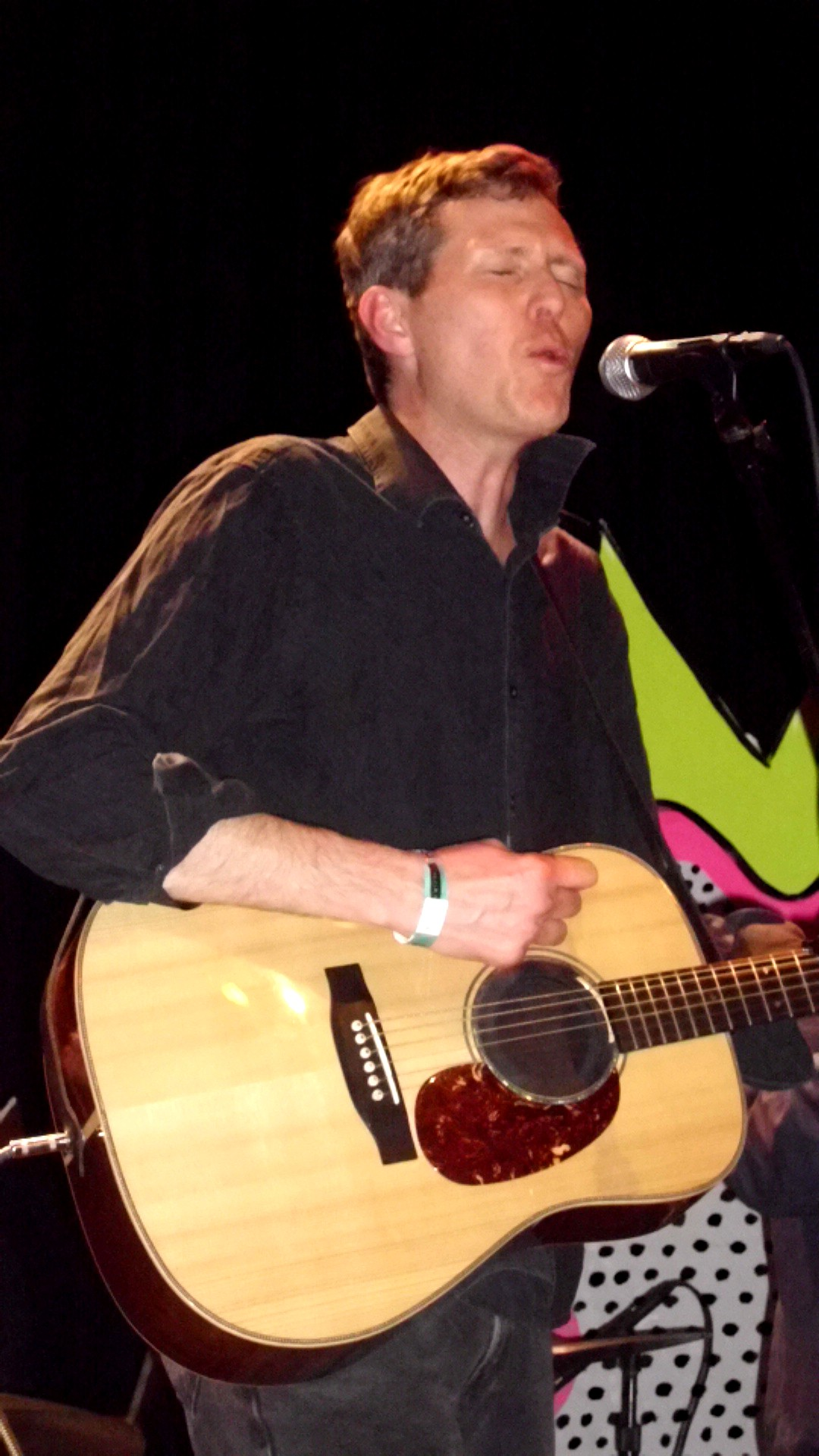
- Fulks in 2011

Background information
- Born: Robert William Fulks; March 25, 1963 (age 63); York, Pennsylvania, U.S.
- Origin: North Carolina
- Genres: Alternative country Bluegrass
- Occupation: Singer-songwriter
- Instruments: Guitar, vocals, banjo
- Years active: 1986–present
- Labels: Boondoggle Records; Bloodshot Records; Yep Roc Records; Geffen Records
- Website: RobbieFulks.com

Robert William "Robbie" Fulks (born March 25, 1963) is an American alternative country singer-songwriter, instrumentalist and long-time resident of Chicago, Illinois. He has released 15 albums over a career spanning more than 30 years. His 2016 record Upland Stories was nominated for a Grammy for Best Folk Album and the song "Alabama at Night" was nominated for a Grammy for Best American Roots Song.

== Early life ==
Fulks was born in York, Pennsylvania, the son of a school teacher father. He grew up in small towns in southeastern Pennsylvania, the Blue Ridge Mountains area of Virginia, and the Piedmont region of North Carolina. Fulks's family moved often when he was young, eventually settling in North Carolina when he was 12, and Fulks considers North Carolina his childhood home. He has a younger brother named Jubal.

Fulks was exposed to music through his family in which everyone played a different musical instrument, from his Aunt Stella on banjo, his Aunt Mildred on violin and his mother on autoharp, to his father playing guitar. Fulks picked up his aunt's banjo when he was six and started playing guitar at age 11.

He graduated from Carolina Friends School in 1980 at the age of 17 and moved to New York City, where he attended Columbia College, Columbia University with the class of 1984.

== Career ==
While at Columbia University, Fulks often played at Gerdes Folk City and other places in Greenwich Village. He also performed on campus in places such as the Postcrypt Coffeehouse. He eventually dropped out of college after two years to pursue music full time.

=== Chicago ===
Fulks moved to Chicago in 1983 and started teaching at Chicago's Old Town School of Folk Music. In 1987, he joined The Special Consensus Bluegrass Band, where he showcased his unique guitar flatpicking style. In the early 1990s he performed in the musical Woody Guthrie's American Song.

He also recorded his original compositions. Many of his early tracks were engineered by Steve Albini, and the Chicago punk-country label Bloodshot Records began releasing them in 1993.

=== Nashville ===
While living in Chicago, Fulks worked for four years as a country songwriter, mainly for Music Row publisher API. His solo debut album, Country Love Songs, engineered by Steve Albini, was released on Bloodshot Records in 1996 and received positive reviews. The Skeletons, members of whom later formed the band The Morells, played on most of the tracks and Tom Brumley and Buck Owens also featured. Country Love Songs was followed in 1997 by South Mouth, which confirmed Fulks's retro-alternative image.

Fans had grown used to his rough and sparse sound, but his third album, 1998's Let's Kill Saturday Night, on Geffen Records, was different. Fulks recorded it during the spring of 1998 in Nashville with producer Rick Will, and the album included performances by Lucinda Williams, Sam Bush, Bill Lloyd, and Al Anderson, as well as guitarist Rob Gjersoe (Jimmie Dale Gilmore), bassist Lorne Rall, and drummer Dan Massey.

Geffen Records disbanded shortly after the release of the record and Fulks, finding himself without a label, started his own company, Boondoggle Records, and released an album of previously unreleased material called The Very Best of Robbie Fulks. He also licenses his music for distribution by Bloodshot.

== Output ==
I called it Gone Away Backward because it's a phrase from the Bible… I stumbled on the phrase later in the evolution of the record when I was looking around for a title. I think it's a nice piquant phrase that has three good, strong, mellifluous words in it. As far as the backwardness of the record, I think it goes backward in terms of nostalgia for the past – bittersweet nostalgia for the past – as well as the recession having knocked everything backwards for people. In that sense, it's not an album about the past, it's an album about now.

— "Interview with Robbie Fulks about 'Gone Away Backward'"
by Kim Ruehl, No Depression Magazine (September 18, 2013)

In 2001 he released Couples in Trouble, a dark, brooding, and decidedly non-country album, and 13 Hillbilly Giants, a collection of covers of classic country numbers, both obscure and well known. Both records were released by Bloodshot Records. Also in 2001, Fulks was an inaugural member of the judging panel for the Independent Music Awards, which supported independent artists.

Fulks did not release another album until 2005. Georgia Hard on Yep Roc Records was a return to his county roots, and was notable for its use of long-time Nashville talent such as Lloyd Green, Hank Singer, Dennis Crouch, and Dallas Wayne. He also released a novelty single called "Fountains of Wayne Hotline," in which he imagined the power pop band Fountains of Wayne having a hotline that struggling songwriters could call for help with their song structure.

In April 2007, Fulks released a 2-CD album, Revenge! (also on Yep Roc Records), which consisted mainly of live concert recordings of older songs and included some new material. One disc, labeled Standing, featured a full-band sound, while the second disc, Sitting, consisted of Fulks solo with little or no musical accompaniment. Standing opens with the tongue-in-cheek studio track "We're on the Road", which describes life on tour and simulates a telephone call to Fulks from Yep Roc Records President Glenn Dicker, demanding a new record and denigrating the sales performance of the "path-breaking, not chart-breaking" album Georgia Hard.

In 2009, Fulks released an alphabetically organized collection of 50 songs via his website, a compilation called 50-Vc. Doberman. He noted that this method, and electronic-only release in general, was not typical of musicians who worked in his genre. In 2010, Fulks released his next album, Happy: Robbie Fulks Plays the Music of Michael Jackson, on Yep Roc Records, in which he covered some of Jackson's songs as a tribute. He had been working on the album since 2005.

In 2013, Fulks released Gone Away Backward, an acoustic album recorded and mixed by Steve Albini and released on Bloodshot Records. It was his first release on that label since 2001's 13 Hillbilly Giants. The album featured banjo, mandolin, fiddle, and upright bass. He said one of the songs, "That's Where I'm From", was autobiographical. Four songs from 50-Vc Doberman were the genesis of Gone Away Backward: the title came from the Book of Isaiah. Fulks said that Gone Away Backward went back to his roots as a musician. The stylistic choice was a good fit with the other musicians who appeared on the recording, Robbie Gjersoe, Jenny Scheinman, and Mike Bub. They recorded live without any overdubbing or elaborate production and laid down around 25 songs in three days.

In 2014, Fulks joined members of The Mekons, dubbed "mini-Mekons", on a trip to write and record on the island of Jura in Scotland. The resulting record, Jura, was released in November 2015 and consisted of traditional songs and original songs written on the trip. In April 2016, he released Upland Stories, and the album was nominated for a 2017 Grammy Award for best folk album. The opening track, "Alabama at Night", was nominated for best American roots song.

== Musical style ==
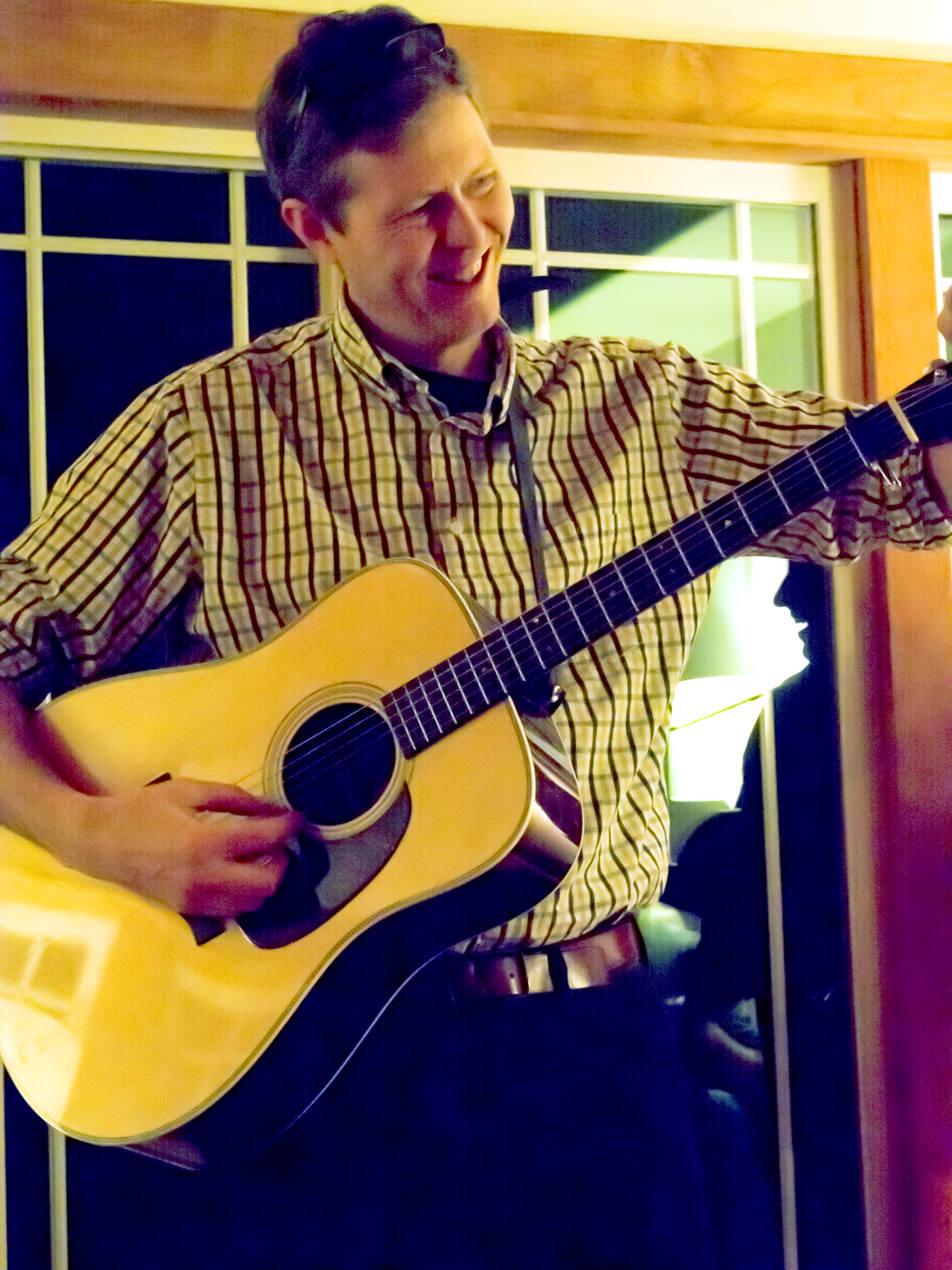
Robbie Fulks playing a house concert on December 14, 2013

As a songwriter, Fulks is difficult to categorize. Nathan Rabin of A.V. Club says he "has a genius for twisting and subverting country tropes," and "there's more to Fulks than tomfoolery and glibly satirical lyrics." Many of his compositions are silly, funny or spoof songs, such as "Godfrey" ("the sickly, unemployed, amateur children's magician") on the compilation children's album The Bottle Let Me Down, while others are serious country songs.

His music is widely described as either alternative country or folk. Fulks's songwriting often includes humor. Peter Applebome of The New York Times describes his work as "one part artful country, one part artful sendup of country, and one part a little of everything else."

Fulks has an encyclopedic knowledge of country and pop music and has produced a critically lauded tribute to Johnny Paycheck called Touch My Heart: A Tribute to Johnny Paycheck, which was released by Sugar Hill Records in 2004. He considers himself adventurous, and is always willing to try new things and experiment. "Why not push the envelope and see what you are capable of doing rather than recycle the same old ideas over and over again," he said. His musicianship has been called "impeccable". Jim Fusilli of the Wall Street Journal suggested that "a world in which Fulks isn't a household name is somehow upside down."

Fulks often plays at The Hideout, a bar and club in Chicago, and has worked long-term residencies there, performing anything from current popular hits to jazz to obscure country masterpieces. He says he rarely performs his own compositions at these shows, preferring to explore other contemporary music that has caught his attention. His live performances feature improvised rearrangements of his own songs, off-the-cuff musical humor, and covers of songs by Michael Jackson, Cher, Shania Twain, and The Bangles, among others.

Fulks has co-written with Dallas Wayne and NRBQ's Al Anderson and others. He had a long-time association with engineer Steve Albini (Big Black, Shellac).

== Personal life ==
Fulks has three children, sons Nicolas, Preston, and Tennessee; and two grandsons, Logan and Miles. His wife is actress Donna Jay Fulks. Fulks's oldest son, Nicolas Fulks, and father-in-law, Donald Jerousek, were contestants on season 12 of The Amazing Race and were placed third.

== Awards ==
- 2016: Grammy nomination, Best Folk Album, for Upland Stories
- 2016: Grammy nomination, Best American Roots Song, for "Alabama at Night" on Upland Stories

== Discography ==
=== Solo records ===
- 1996: Country Love Songs (Bloodshot)
- 1997: South Mouth (Bloodshot)
- 1998: Let's Kill Saturday Night (Geffen)
- 2000: The Very Best of Robbie Fulks (Bloodshot)
- 2001: Couples in Trouble (Boondoggle)
- 2001: 13 Hillbilly Giants (Bloodshot)
- 2004: Live at Double Door 1/16/04 (EMusic Live)
- 2005: Georgia Hard (Yep Roc)
- 2007: Revenge! (Yep Roc Records)
- 2009: 50 Vc. Doberman 50 song digital release (Boondoggle)
- 2010: Happy: Robbie Fulks Plays the Music of Michael Jackson (Boondoggle)/(Yep Roc)
- 2013: Gone Away Backward (Bloodshot)
- 2016: Upland Stories (Bloodshot)
- 2018: Revenge of the Doberman 53 song digital release (Self-released)
- 2019: 16 (Bloodshot)
- 2023: Bluegrass Vacation (Compass)
- 2025: Now Then (Compass)

=== Contributions, collaborations ===
- 1994: "Cigarette State" – For a Life of Sin: A Compilation of Insurgent Chicago Country (Bloodshot)
- 1995: "She Took a Lot of Pills (and Died)" – Hell-Bent: Insurgent Country Volume 2 (Bloodshot)
- 1997: "Wedding of the Bugs" (studio version) – Straight Outta Boone County: Cowboy Songs, Home Songs, Western Songs, Mountain Songs (Bloodshot)
- 1998: "Across the Alley from the Alamo" – The Pine Valley Cosmonauts Salute the Majesty of Bob Wills: The King of Western Swing (Bloodshot)
- 1999: "Call of the Wrecking Ball" – Poor Little Knitter on the Road: A Tribute to The Knitters (Bloodshot)
- 2000: "Bloodshot's Turning 5" – Down to the Promised Land: 5 Years of Bloodshot Records (Bloodshot)
- 2002: "Godfrey" – The Bottle Let Me Down: Songs for Bumpy Wagon Rides (Bloodshot)
- 2004: "Tears at the Grand Ol' Opry" – Hard-Headed Woman: A Celebration of Wanda Jackson (Bloodshot)
- 2004: "Shakin' The Blues" (with Gail Davies) – Touch My Heart: a Tribute to Johnny Paycheck (Sugar Hill Records); Fulks produced this record also
- 2006: "Browns Ferry Blues" – Old Town School Songbook: Volume One (Bloodshot)
- 2006: "Dirty-Mouthed Flo" (live) – Bloodied But Unbowed: Bloodshot Records' Life In The Trenches (DVD) (Bloodshot)
- 2006: "Dirty-Mouthed Flo" (live) – Bloodied But Unbowed: The Soundtrack (Bloodshot)
- 2014: "Sally G" (Paul McCartney cover) – More Super Hits Of The Seventies (Mike-Shell) WFMU fundraiser CD
- 2015: Jura with the mini-Mekons (Bloodshot) – Record Store Day vinyl-only release on Black Friday; subsequently in general release
- 2018: Wild! Wild! Wild! with Linda Gail Lewis (Bloodshot)
- 2019: "Lonely Ain’t Hardly Alive" - Too Late to Pray: Defiant Chicago Roots (Bloodshot)
