= The Meat Purveyors =

Alt-country bluegrass band from Austin, Texas

- Origin: Austin, Texas, United States
- Genres: Alternative country, Bluegrass
- Labels: Bloodshot Records
- Past members: Bill Anderson, Jo Stanli Walston, Cherilyn DiMond, Pete Stiles, Nora Floyd

The Meat Purveyors were an American alternative country bluegrass band from Austin, Texas, United States. The Meat Purveyors consist of Bill Anderson (an Austin Music Hall of Fame inductee) on guitar, Jo Stanli Walston on vocals, Cherilyn diMond on upright bass, and Pete Stiles on mandolin. Founded in 1996, the band released six records on the Bloodshot label between 1998 and 2008.

== Musical style and influence ==
The Meat Purveyors have a wide range of influences, as evidenced by the variety of artists that they pay tribute to in their recorded covers, including songs by Ronee Blakley, Nick Lowe, ABBA, Foreigner, The Human League and Ratt. The band also has a reputation for "sassy stage play", "immaculate harmonies" and "a relentless percussive pace".

== Band history ==
=== Formation ===
In Austin, Texas, during the summer of 1996, Bill Anderson (now in Austin's Captain Beefheart-influenced Churchwood) and Jo Walston (who had previously collaborated as members of the band Joan of Arkansas) initiated the formation of The Texas Meat Purveyors, and quickly drew Cherilyn diMond, Pete Stiles and Nora Floyd into the project.

=== Sweet in the Pants and More Songs About Buildings and Cows ===
In the spring of 1997, the Texas Meat Purveyors played a showcase at South By Southwest. A representative from Bloodshot Records was on hand, and after the showcase he offered the band a recording contract which they accepted.

At this point, the band renamed themselves "The Meat Purveyors", to avoid infringing on the use of "Texas Meat Purveyors" by an actual meat purveying business that was also operating in Austin, Texas. In late 1997, the band released their first album on the Bloodshot label, Sweet in the Pants.

In the summer of 1999 the band released More Songs About Buildings and Cows. However, by New Year's Eve 1999/2000, the band went on hiatus, announcing that they had broken up for good.

=== Reunion and later recordings ===
In September 2001, the Meat Purveyors regrouped, and by the end of the following year they released the new album, All Relationships are Doomed to Fail. In the summer of 2004, the Meat Purveyors released Pain by Numbers, their fourth album on the Bloodshot label. The Meat Purveyors released their most recent Bloodshot album, Someday Soon Things Will Be Much Worse!, in the summer of 2006. In October of the same year they once again called it quits because Cherilyn diMond decided to get married and head off to Maine. She thought better of it (the moving to Maine, not the getting married), and not being able to stay apart forever they toured once during 2007 and then again in 2008. In August 2008 they also released a new EP of three Bill Anderson (one with Jo Walston's help) originals, and four covers entitled Come And Take It. They are currently on yet another hiatus.

== Discography ==
- 1998: Sweet in the Pants (Bloodshot Records)
- 1999: More Songs About Buildings and Cows (Bloodshot Records)
- 1999: The Madonna Trilogy 7" Single (Bloodshot Records)
- 2002: All Relationships are Doomed to Fail (Bloodshot Records)
- 2004: Pain By Numbers (Bloodshot Records)
- 2006: Someday Soon Things Will Be Much Worse! (Bloodshot Records)
- 2008: Come And Take It EP (Bloodshot Records)
