= The Very Best of Robbie Fulks =

Compilation album by Robbie Fulks
- Released: January 18, 2000
- Genre: Alternative country
- Length: 42:29
- Label: Bloodshot

Robbie Fulks chronology
Let's Kill Saturday Night (1998)	The Very Best of Robbie Fulks (2000)	Couples in Trouble (2001)

The Very Best of Robbie Fulks is a compilation album by alternative country musician Robbie Fulks, released on January 18, 2000, on Bloodshot Records. Despite its name, the album is not a greatest hits compilation; instead, it comprises tracks that had never been released on any of Fulks' previous albums. Fulks has said that he thinks the songs on the album correspond to fictional albums of his, such as "I Loathe my Fans" and "Adultery for Beginners".

== Release ==
Fulks was initially only able to release the album over the Internet, because beginning in the summer of 1999, he had not yet been officially released from his contract with Geffen Records. The reason Fulks put the album together and released it was to gain further publicity and, according to Peter Margasak, "give him something to tour behind."

Professional ratings
Review scores
Source	Rating
AllMusic	4/5 stars
The Austin Chronicle	3/4 stars
Orlando Sentinel	4.5/5 stars
Spin	8/10

== Track listing ==
1. Jean Arthur – 2:44
2. Sleepin' on the Job of Love – 2:10
3. Roots Rock Weirdoes – 3:53
4. May the Best Man Win – 2:24
5. Hamilton County Breakdown – 2:56
6. Gravid and Tense – 0:30
7. Parallel Bars – 3:07
8. Love Ain't Nothin' – 2:42
9. I Just Want to Meet the Man – 4:22
10. Wedding of the Bugs – 1:43
11. You Break It, You Pay – 2:23
12. White Man's Bourbon – 5:06
13. That Bangle Girl – 3:00
14. Jello Goodbye – 5:29
