= Elysian Fields (band) =

American rock band

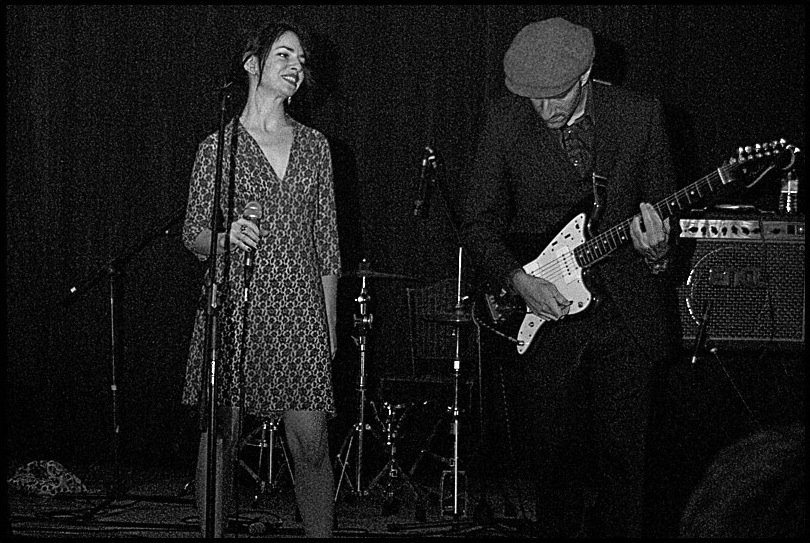
- Oren Bloedow and Jennifer Charles

Background information
- Origin: New York City, United States
- Genres: Dream pop, art rock, indie pop, experimental rock
- Years active: 1995–present
- Labels: Radioactive/Universal, PIAS, Jetset, Naive, Bang, Diluvian
- Members: Jennifer Charles; Oren Bloedow
- Website: www.elysianmusic.com

Elysian Fields is an American band based in Brooklyn, New York, founded in 1995 by the co-composers Jennifer Charles (vocals, instruments) and Oren Bloedow (guitar). Their music was described as "noir rock", due to its sultry, dark and mysterious sounds and lyrics. The band uses mainly acoustic instruments, predominantly guitar, piano, bass and drums, with the occasional appearance of eastern instruments, classical strings, and subtle electronics, the focal point being the voice of Charles in the forefront.

Based in New York City, Elysian Fields have found underground success in the United States but are more popular in Europe. The author of The Dark Stuff, Nick Kent, says of their music, "Maybe we have their out-of-the-mainstreamness to thank for a sound that is still unique -- as sensual as a sleepwalker's wet dream." Since its formation, the band has won quite a devoted cult following, largely by word of mouth. Besides its well-received albums, the band is also noted for its strong live performances. The rest of the band has included many of New York's strongest players: all the members of Jeff Buckley's band, members of Medeski Martin and Wood, Ed Pastorini, Ben Perowsky, James Genus, Thomas Bartlett, Jamie Saft and members of Ollabelle have all played in Elysian Fields at various times.

== History ==
Founders Jennifer Charles and Oren Bloedow had in common a mutual love for artists of multiple genres such as The Beatles, Billie Holiday, Charles Mingus, Iggy Pop, Siouxsie and the Banshees, Captain Beefheart, Ravi Shankar, and classical composers like Frederic Chopin and Olivier Messiaen. Elysian Fields first released an EP in 1996 on Radioactive/Universal Records with cameos from John Lurie and Marc Ribot, which was followed with the critically acclaimed full-length album, Bleed Your Cedar. The band then recorded its second album with Steve Albini which was never released because of artistic differences between the band and the record company. Despite their record company's urgings, Charles and Bloedow did not want to give the recording a more commercial feel, prompting a split with Radioactive/Universal, who retain the recording. Charles said, "We made our second full length with Steve Albini. It wasn't at all what the label was looking for, or wanted. The label wanted us to redo things, go in with more commercial people, and give them songs that they could sell. I didn't want to mess with what we made with Steve. It was what it was. In the end we agreed to disagree, I asked to be released from my contract, and we parted ways. For now it sits in some vault gathering dust, I suppose." (Entitled Clinical Trial, the album was eventually released on the band's bandcamp page in 2014.)

In 2000, the band recorded a one-off album for Jetset records, Queen of the Meadow, which the band toured extensively in Europe, and which reached number 5 on the CMJ charts in the US. Robert Wilson went on to use one of the songs, "Rope of Weeds", in one of his plays. In June 2003, the band released Dreams That Breathe Your Name in France and Benelux on PIAS and Bang Records respectively, followed by an American release in 2004 on their own label Diluvian. The album was called "Close to noir-rock perfection" by the TimeoutNY music editor, Mike Wolf.

A further album, Bum Raps and Love Taps, was released in Europe in late 2005/early 2006 on the Naive label and led to the band touring in Europe for much of 2005 and 2006. The album is dedicated to Charles' grandmother, about whom the title track was written. Another song "'Duel with Cudgels", eight minutes and thirty seconds, takes its title from a Goya painting. Their music is lush and melancholy, with poetic and sometimes surreal lyrics. Their Bum Raps album was finally released in the US in late 2008 on the band's Diluvian imprint.

In addition to contributing to many of John Zorn's produced compilation records, including one of Marc Bolan and the first track on the Serge Gainsbourg tribute, Charles and Bloedow also released two complete albums of Sephardic songs on Zorn's Tzadik label: La Mar Enfortuna (2001) and Convivencia (2007). They give ancient Moorish melodies a revamp with their signature Elysian Fields sound. Charles sings in Ladino as well as in Arabic, Aramaic, Spanish and Greek on these albums. Elysian Fields have also performed in several tribute concerts produced by the impresario Hal Willner, including one of Randy Newman's songs in Los Angeles, where Oren was a musical director, and another for Edgar Allan Poe. Elysian Fields performed at the Carnegie Hall on April 5, 2007, in Michael Dorf's all star tribute to Bruce Springsteen; Oren was once again musical director, backing up several artists including Badly Drawn Boy, and Bruce Springsteen himself for the rousing finale of "Rosalita". Elysian Fields rendition of "Streets of Fire" was noted in both Billboard and Rolling Stone as being one of the show's highlights, and described as "sensual" and "passionate". In February 2009, Elysian Fields performed in Paris in a sold-out show at the Salle Pleyel, as part of John Zorn's Serge Gainsbourg tribute concert alongside Marc Ribot and Sean Lennon.

In 2009, the band released The Afterlife on Vicious Circle records, which was received with high critical praise. European tours followed, along with sold-out concerts in several major cities.

According to the liner notes, their 2020 album Transience of Life was inspired by the 18th-century Chinese novel Dream of the Red Chamber by Cao Xueqin.

Elysian Fields' music has appeared in films as well as many television shows including Damages, Conviction, Smallville, Charmed, One Tree Hill, Extra, The Crow and Lipstick Jungle. "Black acres" from Queen of the Meadow was used in a 2011 Lavazza advertisement.

== Influences ==
Jennifer Charles cited singers of many styles including Anita O'Day, Billie Holiday, Frank Sinatra, Peggy Lee and Blues singers. She's also been inspired by the likes of the Lounge Lizards, Nick Cave, Lydia Lunch, Foetus, Siouxsie, Jean-Louis Murat and The Captain.

== Discography ==
- EP - (1996) - Radioactive/Universal
- Bleed Your Cedar - (1996) - Radioactive/Universal
- Clinical Trial - (1997) - Diluvian
- Queen of the Meadow - (2000) - Jetset
- Bend Your Mind EP - (2000) - The Flower Shop
- Dreams That Breathe Your Name - (2003) - PIAS, Diluvian, Bang! Music
- Bum Raps & Love Taps - (2005) - Naive Records
- The Afterlife - (2009) - Vicious Circle Records, Diluvian
- Last Night on Earth - (2011) - Vicious Circle Records, Ojet Records
- For House Cats And Sea Fans - (2014) - Vicious Circle Records, Ojet Records
- Ghosts of No - (2016) - Vicious Circle Records, Ojet Records
- Pink Air - (2018) - Microcultures, Ojet Records
- Song For A Nun b/w Ball Drive - (2019) - Ojet Records
- "Shelter in Place" single - (2020) - Ojet Records
- "When We Used To" single - (2020) - Ojet Records
- Transience Of Life - (2020) - Microcultures, Ojet Records
- Once Beautiful Twice Removed - (2022) - Ojet Records
- What The Thunder Said - (2024) - Ojet Records
