= Jetset Records =

Record label

Jetset Records was a New York–based indie rock record label. Founded by Shelley Maple in 1996, the label's first release was a reissue of German punk rock band The Golden Lemons' fourth album, Punkrock. The label has released music by a variety of independent bands, including Firewater, Sun Kil Moon and Mogwai.

== Roster ==
- 16 Horsepower
- Arab Strap
- Black Box Recorder
- Dean and Britta
- Congo Norvell
- David Candy
- Death by Chocolate
- Elysian Fields
- Firewater
- The Go-Betweens
- Golden Lemons
- The Gunga Din
- The Jesus Lizard
- Kid Silver
- Luna
- Macha
- Mogwai
- Prolapse
- Sahara Hotnights
- Erik Sanko
- Seaworthy
- Sister Sonny
- Spoozys
- The Stratford 4
- Sun Kil Moon
- Teenage Fanclub
- Ten Benson
- The Flaming Sideburns
- Tram
