= Silverstein discography =

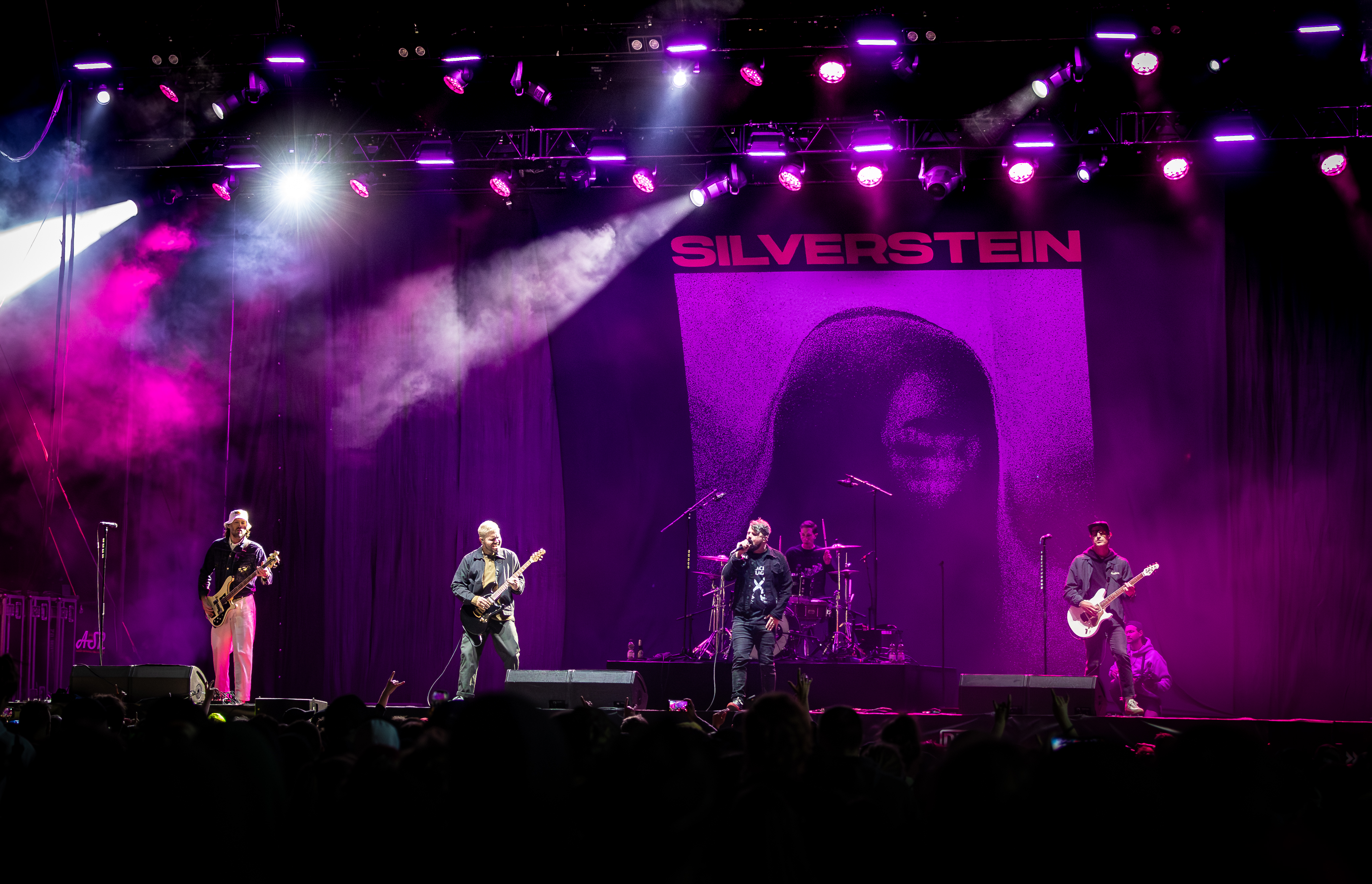
- Silverstein in 2023
- Studio albums: 13
- Extended plays: 6
- Live albums: 2
- Compilation albums: 3
- Singles: 19
- Music videos: 35

The discography of the Canadian post-hardcore band Silverstein consists of 13 studio albums, one live album, six extended plays and one compilation album.

== Studio albums ==
List of studio albums, with selected chart positions, sales and certifications
Title	Album details	Peak chart positions				Sales	Certifications
Title	Album details	CAN	AUS	GER	US	Sales	Certifications
When Broken Is Easily Fixed	Released: May 20, 2003; Label: Victory; Format: CD, CS, DL, LP	—	—	—	— (Note: When Broken Is Easily Fixed did not enter the Billboard 200, but peaked at number 48 on the Heatseekers Albums chart.)	US: 179,000; WW: 200,000+	
Discovering the Waterfront	Released: August 16, 2005; Label: Victory; Format: CD, DL, LP	23	— (Note: Discovering the Waterfront did not enter the ARIA Albums Chart, but peaked at number 13 on the ARIA Hitseekers Albums Chart.)	—	34	US: 232,000; WW: 300,000	MC: Gold
Arrivals & Departures	Released: July 3, 2007; Label: Victory; Format: CD, DL, LP	25	—	—	25	US: 27,000	
A Shipwreck in the Sand	Released: March 31, 2009; Label: Victory; Format: CD, DL, LP	40	—	—	33	US: 30,000	
Rescue	Released: April 26, 2011; Label: Hopeless; Format: CD, DL, LP	29	— (Note: Rescue did not enter the ARIA Albums Chart, but peaked at number three on the ARIA Hitseekers Albums Chart.)	—	38	US: 11,060	
Short Songs	Released: February 7, 2012; Label: Hopeless; Format: CD, DL, 10" vinyl	—	—	—	—		
This Is How the Wind Shifts	Released: February 5, 2013; Label: Hopeless; Format: CD, CS, DL, LP, 7" vinyl box set	—	95	—	59	US: 8,925	
I Am Alive in Everything I Touch	Released: May 19, 2015; Label: Rise; Format: CD, CS, DL, LP	18	— (Note: I Am Alive in Everything I Touch did not enter the ARIA Albums Chart, but peaked at number four on the ARIA Hitseekers Albums Chart.)	—	33		
Dead Reflection	Released: July 14, 2017; Label: Rise; Format: CD, CS, DL, LP	64	— (Note: Dead Reflection did not enter the ARIA Albums Chart, but peaked at number four on the ARIA Hitseekers Albums Chart.)	—	46		
A Beautiful Place to Drown	Released: March 6, 2020; Label: UNFD; Format: CD, CS, DL, LP	—	—	83	122		
Misery Made Me	Released: May 6, 2022; Label: UNFD; Format: CD, CS, DL, LP	—	—	—	—		
Antibloom	Released: February 21, 2025; Label: UNFD; Format: CD, CS, DL, LP	—	—	—	—		
Pink Moon	Released: September 12, 2025; Label: UNFD; Format: CD, CS, DL, LP	—	—	—	—		
"—" denotes releases that did not chart or weren't released in that country.

== Compilation albums ==
List of compilation albums, with selected chart positions
Title	Album details	Peak chart positions	
Title	Album details	CAN	US
18 Candles: The Early Years	Released: May 30, 2006; Label: Victory (VR291); Format: CD, DL	127	148
Redux: The First Ten Years	Released: April 12, 2019; Label: Self-released; Format: CD, CS, DL, LP	—	—
Redux II	Released: November 20, 2020; Label: Self-released; Format: CD, DL, LP	—	—
"—" denotes releases that did not chart or weren't released in that country.

== Live albums ==
List of live albums
Title	Album details
Decade (Live at the El Mocambo)	Released: June 8, 2010; Label: Victory (VR589); Format: CD/DVD-V, DL
LIVE: When Broken 15 Easily Fixed	Released: November 29, 2019; Label: Self-released; Format: CD, CS, DL, LP

== Extended plays ==
List of extended plays
Title	Album details
Summer's Stellar Gaze	Released: August 7, 2000; Label: Self-released; Format: CD
When the Shadows Beam	Released: April 26, 2002; Label: Giving Tree Music (DW-18); Format: CD
Transitions	Released: December 7, 2010; Label: Hopeless (HR726-2); Format: CD, DL
Support Your Local Record Store	Released: April 16, 2011; Label: Hopeless (RSD); Format: DL, 7" vinyl
Four Minutes Being Cool (split with August Burns Red)	Released: April 20, 2013; Label: Hopeless (HR6764-7); Format: DL, 7" vinyl
Quaranstein	Released: June 12, 2020; Label: –; Format: DL

== Singles ==
List of singles as lead artist, showing year released, chart positions, certifications and album name
Title	Year	Peak chart positions	Certifications	Album
Title	Year	US Main.	Certifications	Album
"Smile in Your Sleep"	2005	—	RIAA: Gold	Discovering the Waterfront
"If You Could See into My Soul"	2007	—		Arrivals & Departures
"Still Dreaming"	2008	—		Arrivals & Departures
"Vices"	2009	—		A Shipwreck in the Sand
"Smile in Your Sleep (live)" / "Born Dead (live)" (feat. Scott Wade)	2010	—		Decade (Live at the El Mocambo)
"The Artist"	2011	—		Rescue
"Stand Amid the Roar"	2012	—		This Is How the Wind Shifts
"Massachusetts"	2013	—		This Is How the Wind Shifts
"A Midwestern State of Emergency"	2015	—		I Am Alive in Everything I Touch
"Ghost"	2016	—		Dead Reflection
"Retrograde"	2017	—		Dead Reflection
"The Afterglow"	2017	—		Dead Reflection
"Bankrupt"	2021	—		Misery Made Me
"It's Over"	2021	—		Misery Made Me
"Ultraviolet"	2022	37		Misery Made Me
"Die Alone"	2022	—		Misery Made Me
"Live Like This"	2022	—		Misery Made Me
"Poison Pill"	2023	—		Misery Made Me (Deluxe)
"Skin & Bones"	2024	—		Antibloom
"Confession"	2024	—		Antibloom
"Don't Let Me Get Too Low"	2025	—		Antibloom
"Negative Space"	2025	—		Pink Moon
"Drain the Blood" (with Dayseeker)	2025	—		Pink Moon
"—" denotes releases that did not chart or weren't released in that country.

== Other appearances ==
Year	Song	Album	Label
2007	"Red Light Pledge" (acoustic)	Punk Goes Acoustic 2	Fearless
2009	"Apologize" (OneRepublic cover)	Punk Goes Pop 2	Fearless
2011	"Stay Posi" (feat. Ryan Key of Yellowcard)	Take Action! Vol. 10	Hopeless
2011	"Runaway" (Kanye West cover) (featuring Down with Webster)	Punk Goes Pop 4	Fearless
2012	"Song to Woody" (Bob Dylan cover)	Chimes of Freedom: Songs of Bob Dylan Honoring 50 Years of Amnesty International	Fontana Distribution
2019	"Disarm" (The Smashing Pumpkins cover)	Songs That Saved My Life Vol. 2	Hopeless
2023	"THIRST4VIOLENCE" (featured artist for nothing,nowhere.)	Void Eternal	Fueled by Ramen

== Music videos ==
Year	Song	Director	Album
2003	"Giving Up" (2 versions)	Micah Meisner	When Broken Is Easily Fixed
2004	"Smashed into Pieces"	Shane Drake	When Broken Is Easily Fixed
2005	"Smile in Your Sleep"	Marc Ricciardelli	Discovering the Waterfront
2006	"Discovering the Waterfront"	Benjamin Weinstein	Discovering the Waterfront
2006	"My Heroine"	Dale Resteghini	Discovering the Waterfront
2007	"If You Could See into My Soul"	Endeavor Media	Arrivals & Departures
2008	"Still Dreaming"	Stephen Scott	Arrivals & Departures
2009	"Vices"	Robby Starbuck	A Shipwreck in the Sand
2010	"American Dream"	Robby Starbuck	A Shipwreck in the Sand
2011	"Sacrifice"	Robby Starbuck	Rescue
2011	"The Artist"	Robby Starbuck	Rescue
2011	"Burning Hearts"	Colin Minihan	Rescue
2012	"Brookfield"	Josh Bradford	Short Songs
2012	"Forget Your Heart"	Brooks Reynolds	Rescue
2012	"SOS"	Josh Bradford	Short Songs
2013	"Massachusetts"		This Is How the Wind Shifts
2013	"A Better Place"		This Is How the Wind Shifts
2014	"On Brave Mountains We Conquer"		This Is How the Wind Shifts
2014	"This Is How the Wind Shifts"	Josh Bradford	This Is How the Wind Shifts
2015	"A Midwestern State of Emergency"	Max Moore	I Am Alive in Everything I Touch
2015	"Face of the Earth"		I Am Alive in Everything I Touch
2016	"The Continual Condition"	North Film Co.	I Am Alive in Everything I Touch
2016	"Toronto (Unabridged)"	Wyatt Clough & Roger Galvez	I Am Alive in Everything I Touch
2016	"Ghost"	Cat Hostickn	Dead Reflection
2017	"Retrograde"		Dead Reflection
2017	"The Afterglow"	Wyatt Clough	Dead Reflection
2018	"Whiplash"	Wyatt Clough & Roger Galvez	Dead Reflection
2020	"Infinite"	Wyatt Clough	A Beautiful Place To Drown
2020	"Bad Habits"	Wyatt Clough	A Beautiful Place To Drown
2021	"Bankrupt"	Wyatt Clough	Misery Made Me
2021	"It's Over"		Misery Made Me
2022	"Ultraviolet"	Wyatt Clough	Misery Made Me
2022	"Die Alone"	Wyatt Clough	Misery Made Me
2022	"Live Like This"	Wyatt Clough	Misery Made Me
2023	"Poison Pill"	Wyatt Clough	Misery Made Me (Deluxe)
2024	"Skin & Bones"	Wyatt Clough	Antibloom
2024	"Confession"	Wyatt Clough	Antibloom
2025	"Don't Let Me Get Too Low"	Wyatt Clough	Antibloom
