= Redux: The First Ten Years =

Redux: The First 10 Years

Studio album by Silverstein
- Released: 12 April 2019
- Recorded: August–October 2018
- Studio: Union Sound Company and Room 21 Sound, Toronto, ON
- Genre: Emo; post-hardcore
- Length: 43:37
- Label: Self-released (as Silverstein Music, Inc)
- Producer: Sam Guaiana

Silverstein chronology
Dead Reflection (2017)	Redux: The First 10 Years (2019)	A Beautiful Place to Drown (2020)

Redux: The First 10 Years is an album of re-recordings by the Canadian post-hardcore band Silverstein, released in 2019 independently by the band themselves. The album consists of 12 re-recorded songs from their first four albums which were released in their first ten years as a band.

== Background and recording ==
Silverstein formed in February 2000 in Burlington, Ontario. Silverstein released two EPs, Summer's Stellar Gaze (2000) and When the Shadows Beam (2002) independently, then on October 22, 2002, it was announced that the band had signed to Victory Records. The band released four albums on Victory in their first ten years after forming: When Broken Is Easily Fixed (2003), Discovering The Waterfront (2005), Arrivals & Departures (2007), and A Shipwreck In The Sand (2009). Liam Cormier of Cancer Bats reprises his guest vocal role on "Vices".

== Release ==
Redux: The First 10 Years was announced 15 February 2019 through the band's website. It was announced that the album would contain 12 brand new recordings of popular tracks from their first four albums. The tracklist was revealed shortly after. It was also announced that it would be the first album the band released themselves independently of a label. The album was released 12 April 2019.

"Smashed into Pieces" had been previously re-recorded by the band in 2013 the ten-year anniversary of the album; the band assured fans that the version on Redux was a new version recorded with the rest of the album in 2018.

== Tracklist ==
No.	Title	Original album	Length
1.	"Smashed Into Pieces"	When Broken Is Easily Fixed	3:40
2.	"Smile In Your Sleep"	Discovering the Waterfront	3:16
3.	"American Dream"	A Shipwreck in the Sand	3:10
4.	"Bleeds No More"	When Broken Is Easily Fixed	3:16
5.	"My Heroine"	Discovering the Waterfront	3:30
6.	"Vices" (featuring Liam Cormier of Cancer Bats)	A Shipwreck in the Sand	3:16
7.	"Your Sword Vs My Dagger"	Discovering the Waterfront	3:00
8.	"If You Could See Into My Soul"	Arrivals & Departures	4:00
9.	"Giving Up"	When Broken Is Easily Fixed	4:08
10.	"Still Dreaming" (acoustic)	Arrivals & Departures	4:17
11.	"Red Light Pledge"	When Broken Is Easily Fixed	3:51
12.	"Call It Karma"	Discovering the Waterfront	4:14

== Personnel ==
Personnel per booklet.

Silverstein

- Shane Told – vocals, additional guitar
- Paul Koehler – drums
- Paul Marc Rousseau – lead guitar
- Josh Bradford – rhythm guitar
- Billy Hamilton – bass guitar

Additional musicians

- Chris Schembri – additional guitar and lyrics (track 3)
- Liam Cormier – vocals (track 6)
- Mike Tompa – violin, cello, mellotron

Production

- Kyle Marchant – sound engineer
- Mike Kalajian – mastering
- Sam Guaiana – production, mixing, sound engineer
