= I Am Alive in Everything I Touch =

Studio album by Silverstein
- Released: May 19, 2015
- Recorded: October–November 2014
- Studio: Metalworks Studios, Mississauga, Ontario; The Post Office, Toronto, Ontario
- Genre: Screamo; post-hardcore
- Length: 40:27
- Label: Rise; New Damage
- Producer: Jordan Valeriote

Silverstein chronology
This Is How the Wind Shifts (2013)	I Am Alive in Everything I Touch (2015)	Dead Reflection (2017)

I Am Alive in Everything I Touch is the eighth studio album by the Canadian post-hardcore band Silverstein. The album was released on May 19, 2015 through Rise Records (worldwide) and New Damage Records (Canada).

== Music and lyrics ==
Similar to A Shipwreck in the Sand (2009) and This Is How the Wind Shifts (2013), I Am Alive in Everything I Touch is a concept album penned by lyricist and lead vocalist Shane Told. The album is split into 4 chapters: "Borealis" (North), "Austeralis" (South), "Zephyrus" (West) and "Eurus" (East). Each track's setting is a different city that geographically falls into that region, with real life recordings of each city incorporated into the songs. Told had this to say about the album:

All the city clips we recorded, the transitions, and making sure the concept really worked and told this story of loneliness despite being surrounded by so much excitement. As much as I’ve put myself out there over all the records we’ve done, there’s something more real about this one. At times I almost stopped myself and said, is this going too far? Am I going to say something I’m going to regret? And after taking a step back and a few breaks from writing, I decided I needed to do this.

== Recording ==
The album was recorded with producer Jordan Valeriote. (Note: The band have previously worked with Valeriote on Transitions (2010), Rescue (2011), Short Songs (2012) and This Is How the Wind Shifts (2013).)

== Release ==
On January 13, 2015 A music video for "A Midwestern State of Emergency" was released alongside the song's streaming release and coincided with the official announcement of I Am Alive in Everything I Touch. The music video was directed by Max Moore and produced by Nolan Cubero. The video begins with Shane Told (lead vocalist) in a bath of water, seemingly dead. He resuscitates as the music begins and the band can be seen playing throughout – with Told subsequently singing to himself in many places. The music video ends in the same place it begins, only with Told now on the floor spluttering water out.

A lyric video for the song "Milestone" was released on March 4, 2015. This video consists of footage from Silverstein's Discovering the Waterfront 10th anniversary tour as well as images of highways and buildings. This is all overlaid by the lyrics of the song. On May 11, the music video for "Face of the Earth" was released. On May 12, the album was available for streaming, and was released on May 19 on Rise. In November and December, the band went on a co-headlining US tour with Senses Fail. They were supported by Hundredth and Capsize.

== Reception ==
Professional ratings
Review scores
Source	Rating
Alternative Press	4/5 stars
Exclaim!	7/10
idobi Radio	6/10
Mosh	4.5/5 stars
Punknews.org	3.5/5 stars
Revolver	3.5/5
Ultimate Guitar Archive	6.9/10

Jonathan Diener of Alternative Press said that the album's concept didn't "overshadow" the compositions. He named "A Midwestern State of Emergency" as the group's "best work", showing off their combination of screaming verses flowing into "huge singalong choruses". He also said that "Late on 6th" broke the flow so that "monotony never sets in".

The album was included on The Noise's "The 27 Best Albums of 2015 So Far" list.

== Track listing ==
Chapter I: Borealis
No.	Title	Writer(s)	City	Length
1.	"Toronto (abridged)"		Toronto, ON	0:46
2.	"A Midwestern State of Emergency"	Shane Told	Detroit, MI	3:35
3.	"Face of the Earth"	Told	Chicago, IL	3:03

Chapter II: Austeralis
No.	Title	Writer(s)	City	Length
4.	"Heaven, Hell and Purgatory"	Told	Atlanta, GA	2:57
5.	"Buried at Sea"	Told	Pensacola, FL	3:06
6.	"Late on 6th"	Told	Austin, TX	5:05

Chapter III: Zephyrus
No.	Title	Writer(s)	City	Length
7.	"Milestone"	Told	Los Angeles, CA	3:28
8.	"The Continual Condition"	Told	Las Vegas, NV	3:30
9.	"Desert Nights"	Told	Phoenix, AZ	3:02

Chapter IV: Eurus
No.	Title	Writer(s)	City	Length
10.	"In the Dark"	Told	Brooklyn, NY	3:27
11.	"Je me Souviens"	Told	Montreal, QC	3:27
12.	"Toronto (unabridged)"	Told	Toronto, ON	5:01
Total length:				40:27

== Personnel ==
Silverstein

- Shane Told – lead vocals
- Paul Koehler – drums
- Josh Bradford – rhythm guitar
- Billy Hamilton – bass
- Paul Marc Rousseau – lead guitar

Production

- Jordan Valeriote – producer, mixing, engineer
- Chris Cosentino – engineer
- Joao Carvalho – mastering
- Paul Dickinson – drum tech
- Michael Colasardo – album layout
- Anna Lee – band photography
- Billy Hamilton – additional photography
- Martin Wittfooth – album illustrations
- Anna Jarvis – cello

== Charts ==
Chart (2015)	Peak position
Australian Hitseekers Albums (ARIA)	4
Canadian Albums (Billboard)	18
US Billboard 200	33
US Independent Albums (Billboard)	3
US Indie Store Album Sales (Billboard)	3
US Top Alternative Albums (Billboard)	6
US Top Hard Rock Albums (Billboard)	3
US Top Rock Albums (Billboard)	6
