= A Beautiful Place to Drown =

Studio album by Silverstein
- Released: March 6, 2020
- Recorded: September 23–November 1, 2019
- Studios: Union (Toronto); MFC (Mimico)
- Genre: Post-hardcore
- Length: 37:06
- Label: UNFD
- Producer: Sam Guaiana

Silverstein chronology
Redux: The First Ten Years (2019)	A Beautiful Place to Drown (2020)	Redux II (2020)

Singles from A Beautiful Place to Drown
- 1. "Burn It Down" Released: June 27, 2019; 2. "Infinite" Released: January 9, 2020; 3. "Bad Habits" Released: February 5, 2020; 4. "Madness" Released: March 3, 2020

A Beautiful Place to Drown is the tenth studio album by the Canadian post-hardcore band Silverstein, released on March 6, 2020 through UNFD worldwide. The album was nominated for Rock Album of the Year at the 2021 Juno Awards.

Professional ratings
Review scores
Source	Rating
Wall of Sound	7/10 stars
Kerrang!	3/5 stars
The Spill Magazine	4.5/5 stars

== Release ==
Silverstein released "Burn It Down" on June 27, 2019. With a vocal feature from Caleb Shomo of Beartooth, the song was the band's first new material since 2017's Dead Reflection. Vocalist Shane Told said that "Burn It Down" "picks up right where Dead Reflection left off". On January 8, 2020, they released the next single, "Infinite", with guest vocals from Aaron Gillespie of Underoath. That same day, they announced the details of their new album, including the title, release date, album art, and track list, as well as plans for an extensive tour with support from Hawthorne Heights, Four Year Strong, and I the Mighty. The third single, "Bad Habits", came out on February 5 and included a guitar feature from Aaron Marshall from Intervals. The last single to debut in advance of the album's release was Princess Nokia collaboration "Madness", released on March 2.

== Track listing ==
All lyrics are written by Shane Told.

A Beautiful Place to Drown track listing
No.	Title	Music	Length
1.	"Bad Habits" (featuring Intervals)	Josh Bradford; Paul Marc Rousseau; Daniel Tremblay	2:53
2.	"Burn It Down" (featuring Caleb Shomo)	Rousseau; Caleb Shomo	3:10
3.	"Where Are You"	Bradford; Rousseau; Tremblay	2:53
4.	"Infinite" (featuring Aaron Gillespie)	Rousseau; Jonathan Gering; Tremblay	2:44
5.	"Shape Shift"	Rousseau; Beau Burchell	3:29
6.	"All on Me" (featuring Saxl Rose)	Rousseau; Blake Harnage	3:08
7.	"Madness" (featuring Princess Nokia)	Rousseau	3:38
8.	"Say Yes!"	Rousseau	2:39
9.	"Stop"	Rousseau; Anton Delost	3:25
10.	"September 14th"	Shane Told	3:15
11.	"Coming Down"	Rousseau	2:52
12.	"Take What You Give" (featuring Pierre Bouvier)	Rousseau; Bradford; Derek Hoffman	3:00
Total length:			36:05

== Personnel ==
Credits adapted from the album's liner notes and Tidal.

=== Silverstein ===
- Josh Bradford – rhythm guitar
- Billy Hamilton – bass
- Paul Koehler – drums
- Paul Marc Rousseau – lead guitar, additional production
- Shane Told – lead vocals

=== Additional contributors ===
- Sam Guaiana – production, engineering, mixing
- Jonathan Gering – additional production
- Darren McGill – additional engineering
- Mike Kalajian – mastering
- Jordan Gauthier – drum technician
- Mike Tompa – strings, organ
- Antonio "Saxl Rose" Hancock – saxophone
- Intervals – performance on "Bad Habits"
- Caleb Shomo – performance on "Burn It Down"
- Aaron Gillespie – performance on "Infinite"
- Princess Nokia – performance on "Madness"
- Pierre Bouvier – performance on "Take What You Give"
- 23in – art direction, design

== Charts ==
Chart performance for A Beautiful Place to Drown
Chart (2020)	Peak position
German Albums (Offizielle Top 100)	83
UK Rock & Metal Albums (Official Charts)	22
US Billboard 200	122
US Independent Albums (Billboard)	15
US Indie Store Album Sales (Billboard)	25
US Top Alternative Albums (Billboard)	7
US Top Hard Rock Albums (Billboard)	5
US Top Rock Albums (Billboard)	16

== See also ==
- List of 2020 albums
