= Capstan (band) =

American post-hardcore band

- Origin: Orlando, Florida, U.S.
- Genres: Melodic hardcore; post-hardcore; pop punk
- Years active: 2012–present
- Labels: Adventure Cat; Fearless
- Members: Anthony DeMario; Joseph Mabry; Harrison Bormann; Andrew Bozymowski; Scott Fisher
- Website: capstanband.com

Capstan is an American post-hardcore band from Orlando, Florida. To date, the band has released six EPs and three studio albums. The band was formerly signed to Adventure Cat Records, and is currently signed to Fearless Records.

== History ==
=== Early years and EPs (2012–2016) ===
Capstan formed in March 2012. On April 20, 2013, the band self-released Growing Deaf, a split EP with the band Priorities. Capstan recorded their half of the EP in their house, and had it mastered by John Naclerio at NADA Studios. On December 2, 2014, Capstan self-released their second EP, Seasonal Depression. On November 15, 2015, the band self-released an acoustic EP, Parting Gifts. Parting Gifts was recorded and mixed at Torch & Star Studios, and was mastered at NADA Studios.

On July 19, 2016, Capstan self-released their fourth EP, Cultural Divide. The EP was well-received and got the band noticed by Michael Kaminsky of KMGMT, manager of Neck Deep, As It Is, Tonight Alive, and more. At the time, Kaminsky was planning a new project, Adventure Cat Records, and signed Capstan as one of the label's first two artists. Kaminsky said about the band in an interview with Alternative Press that "Sometimes you hear an act that inspires you to do more. In this case, it was two acts, and we started a record label just to work with them."

On January 12, 2018, Capstan released their fifth EP, In The Wake of Our Discord via Adventure Cat Records. The EP was produced, engineered, and mixed by Seth Henderson at Always Be Genius Studios in Chicago. The EP was mastered by Kris Crummett at Interlace Audio in Portland, Oregon. In March 2018, it was announced that Capstan would be playing the Owly.FM stage at Vans' 2018 Warped Tour. Later that year, Capstan self-released Haunted on June 15, composed of two reimagined recordings of previously released songs. The EP was recorded and mixed by James Paul Wisner at Wisner Productions and mastered by Andy VanDette at Engine Room Audio. Soon after, in July 2018, Silverstein announced their 15th anniversary tour for When Broken Is Easily Fixed with Capstan as one of the three opening acts.

=== Restless Heart, Keep Running (2019) ===
On September 20, 2019, Capstan released their debut studio album, Restless Heart, Keep Running via Fearless Records. The album was applauded for its blend of elements from post-hardcore, pop punk, and rock. Cryptic Rock reviewed the album saying, "Overall, Capstan’s debut album works to cement their place in the scene and showcases why they are here to stay. An honest piece of work, they can only continue to grow from here. Emotional and revealing, Cryptic Rock gives Restless Heart, Keep Running 4 out of 5 stars." In October 2019, Capstan embarked on a headlinining North America tour, traveling through the East Coast, Midwest, and Toronto.

=== Separate (2021) ===
On July 23, 2021, Capstan released their second studio album, Separate, via Fearless Records.

=== The Mosaic (2024) ===
On May 24, 2024, Capstan Released their third studio album, "The Mosaic" via Fearless Records.

== Members ==
- Anthony DeMario – vocals
- Harrison Bormann – guitar
- Andrew Bozymowski – bass, vocals
- Scott Fisher – drums
- Joseph Mabry – guitar, vocals

== Discography ==
Studio albums

- Restless Heart, Keep Running (Fearless Records, 2019)
- Separate (Fearless Records, 2021)
- The Mosaic (Fearless Records, 2024)

EPs

- Growing Deaf (self-released, 2013)
- Seasonal Depression (self-released, 2014)
- Parting Gifts (self-released, 2015)
- Cultural Divide (self-released, 2016)
- In The Wake of Our Discord (Adventure Cat Records, 2018)
- Haunted (self-released, 2018)
