= Still Dreaming =

Still Dreaming may refer to:

- Still Dreaming (Joshua Redman album), 2018
- Still Dreaming (Tomorrow X Together album), 2021
- "Still Dreaming", a song by 311 from Evolver, 2003
- "Still Dreaming", a song by Nas from Hip Hop Is Dead, 2006
- "Still Dreaming", a song by Silverstein from Arrivals & Departures, 2007
