= Misery Made Me =

Studio album by Silverstein
- Released: May 6, 2022
- Recorded: 2021
- Genre: Post-hardcore
- Length: 37:08
- Label: NSEW Recordings; UNFD
- Producer: Sam Guaiana

Silverstein chronology
Redux II (2020)	Misery Made Me (2022)	Antibloom (2025)

Singles from Misery Made Me
- 1. "Bankrupt" Released: April 15, 2021; 2. "It's Over" Released: November 18, 2021; 3. "Ultraviolet" Released: February 24, 2022; 4. "Die Alone" Released: April 7, 2022; 5. "Live Like This" Released: May 3, 2022; 6. "Poison Pill" Released: March 23, 2023

Misery Made Me is the eleventh studio album by the Canadian post-hardcore band Silverstein, released on May 6, 2022. The album was distributed via UNFD worldwide and the band's own NSEW Recordings in Canada.

== Background ==
Silverstein wrote and recorded the song "Bankrupt" in the midst of the COVID-19 pandemic. After more than a year of being unable to tour, the band was inspired by their experiences during the pandemic to return to the studio. Lyrically, the band has described "Bankrupt" as a criticism of the government's handling of the public health crisis and the greed of elected officials. "Bankrupt" was released on April 16, 2021 as a standalone single accompanied by a music video directed by Wyatt Clough.

"It's Over" was released as a second standalone single on November 18, 2021. On February 18, 2022, Silverstein revealed the title and album cover of Misery Made Me, set to be released on May 6, including both singles "Bankrupt" and "It's Over". This announcement was followed by the release of "Ultraviolet" on February 24. "Ultraviolet" spent 3 weeks on Billboard's Mainstream Rock Airplay chart, peaking at 37.

"Die Alone", featuring a vocal performance from Andrew Neufeld of the hardcore punk band Comeback Kid, was released as the fourth single from Misery Made Me on April 7. Three days prior to the album release date, Silverstein shared the song "Live Like This" with guest vocals from nothing,nowhere. as the final promotional single.

On March 23, 2023, Silverstein announced Misery Made Me Deluxe, an extended version of the album which was released on April 7. The deluxe edition features live performances and remixes of songs from the standard album, as well as new single "Poison Pill", one of two previously unheard tracks from the original recording sessions.

== Track listing ==
Standard edition (disc 1)
No.	Title	Length
1.	"Our Song"	3:11
2.	"Die Alone" (featuring Andrew Neufeld of Comeback Kid)	2:47
3.	"Ultraviolet"	2:53
4.	"Cold Blood" (featuring Trevor Daniel)	2:52
5.	"It's Over"	3:23
6.	"The Altar / Mary"	3:58
7.	"Slow Motion" (featuring Mike Hranica of The Devil Wears Prada)	3:08
8.	"Don't Wait Up"	3:27
9.	"Bankrupt"	3:21
10.	"Live Like This" (featuring Nothing,Nowhere)	3:56
11.	"Misery"	4:08
Total length:		37:08

Deluxe edition (disc 2)
No.	Title	Length
12.	"Poison Pill"	3:17
13.	"Stitches"	2:40
14.	"Mary" (Orchestral)	1:26
15.	"Don't Wait Up" (Acoustic)	2:55
16.	"Poison Pill" (Acoustic)	3:10
17.	"Bankrupt" (Live in Toronto)	3:32
18.	"It's Over" (Live in Toronto)	3:44
Total length:		57:55

== Personnel ==
Credits via Silverstein's website.

Musicians

- Shane Told – vocals
- Paul Marc Rousseau – guitar
- Josh Bradford – guitar
- Billy Hamilton – bass
- Paul Koehler – drums

Production

- Sam Guaiana – production, engineering, mixing
- Paul Marc Rousseau – additional production
- Mike Tompa – additional production on "Mary"
- Daniel Braunstein – additional production on "Slow Motion"
- Jill Zimmerman – assistant engineering
- Darren Magierowski – assistant engineering
- Mike Kalajian – mastering
- Jordan Gauthier – drum tech
- Bruce Nicol – guitar tech
- Jordan Butcher at Strange Practice – album layout
- Wyatt Clough – photography
