= This Is How the Wind Shifts =

2013 album by Silverstein

Studio album by Silverstein
- Released: February 5, 2013
- Recorded: Late 2012
- Studios: Sundown Studios, Guelph, Ontario
- Genres: Post-hardcore; emo; metalcore
- Length: 41:06
- Label: Hopeless
- Producer: Jordan Valeriote

Silverstein chronology
Short Songs (2012)	This Is How the Wind Shifts (2013)	I Am Alive in Everything I Touch (2015)

Singles from This Is How the Wind Shifts
- 1. "Stand Amid the Roar" Released: December 7, 2012; 2. "Massachusetts" Released: January 15, 2013

This Is How the Wind Shifts is the seventh studio album by the Canadian post-hardcore band Silverstein, released on February 5, 2013, through Hopeless Records. It is also their last release under Hopeless.

It is the first album to not feature long time lead guitarist Neil Boshart and first to include Paul Marc Rousseau as an official member, taking over lead guitar duties.

== Background and recording ==
Silverstein announced they had signed with Hopeless on November 15, 2010. Vocalist Shane Told said the band have been "huge fans of the label since their inception". Hopeless released the band's Rescue (2011) album in April 2011 and Short Songs (2012) album in February 2012. In mid-to-late August, the band went on the Short Songs, Short Tour; the last tour they would go on before starting to work on a new album. In late September, the band announced that guitarist Neil Boshart hasn't been in the band for the preceding month and was replaced by Paul Marc Rousseau, who has previously worked for the band. This Is How the Wind Shifts was recorded at Sundown Studios in Guelph, Ontario, Canada with producer Jordan Valeriote. (Note: The band have previously worked with Valeriote on Transitions (2010), Rescue (2011) and Short Songs (2012).) Valeriote also engineered and mixed the album. It was mastered by Troy Glessener at Spectre Mastering.

== Composition ==
=== Concept ===
According to Told, This Is How the Wind Shifts is a concept album, similar to A Shipwreck in the Sand (2009). Told was in the same head space as when he wrote Shipwreck. He wished to do more than hoping material would come out of the band jamming together. This Is How the Wind Shifts does not have the typical beginning, middle and end story line that featured on Shipwreck. The album consists of six different stories alongside parallel tracks: One of the songs begin the story and another end the story. Told thought this approach was "interesting". However, he isn't that interested in concept albums, declaring he simply tries "to write great songs." Told said of the album:

The idea of this album is how a person's life can change forever with just one event. It is the "what if" that everyone thinks about from time to time. This album is different from a typical start to finish story concept album, or an album where all the songs have a common theme. Each track has a parallel track that tells the story in a different light, what would have happened if things were different due to a single event. The song titles of each parallel track go together, forming a sentence or in some cases two words that relate to each other and to the story. Overall, the point of this album is not to prove the existence of fate, or to disprove it. It's a discussion of life, of loss, of and, of success within failure, of failure within success, of the struggle between your actions and your feelings, and how those don't always go together. This Is How The Wind Shifts is a journey that jumps around but stays cohesive, with underlying meaning and stories that have a real human meaning and cater to the soul.

=== Music and lyrics ===
The music for "Stand Amid the Roar" was written by Rousseau before he had joined the band. Told mention that the group "weren't sure at first if it was going to be a great fit". Rousseau showed a demo of "Stand Amid the Roar" to the band and that was "all it took for him to get in the band!", as Told revealed. "On Brave Mountains We Conquer", and its counterpart "In Silent Seas We Drown", are the most autobiographical songs on the album. "On Brave Mountains We Conquer" also talks about settling down and giving up one's dreams. The lyrics of "Massachusetts" refer to an abusive relationship and the problems one faces with it. The band nearly thought about not recording the song due to its similarity to another Silverstein song. As a compromise, the group "changed it around slightly" according to Told. The tracks "This Is How" and "The Wind Shifts" were written and recorded at the same time. Told notes that they are a summary of the album and that they "symbolize how similar everyone is regardless of how different they seem externally."

"A Better Place" talks about death and the concept of the afterlife. It also talks about regret and people blaming themselves. The group wanted a song in 6/8 time on the album and this resulted in "Hide Your Secrets". The song was the last one written for the album and recalls the band's early output. It also shows off the band's late 1990s post-hardcore and emo influences. "Arrivals" came about from Rousseau jamming a guitar riff with his delay pedal. Told overheard it and queried him what it was, Rousseau replied that he had written vocals for it. Told liked it and thought it was "a really good fit on the album" and prompted Rousseau to use it on the album. Rousseau revealed that the song refers relationship when someone he misses is away and that he is not accustomed the other side "of that emotional exchange". The song was reprised at the end of the album from a different point of view. "In a Place of Solace" is the heaviest song in the band's repertoire. "In Silent Seas We Drown" matches the story featured in "On Brave Mountains We Conquer" but from a parallel universe point of view. Told notes "There is a loneliness and desperation which continues on the second half of this record".

"California" follows the abusive relationship featured in "Massachusetts". "California" refers to getting out of the relationship and forgetting about it despite the difficulties in doing so. The music for "To Live and to Lose" was the first piece of music written for the album and Told said "it was strange to start the writing process with such an experimental track". Told was unsure at first about how to go about it, vocally and lyrically. Told, with his girlfriend's help, placed himself as the character he was writing. "With Second Chances" went through the most changes before the final version appeared on the album. The band were fighting about what they should do with the song. Told defended the song as he liked the chorus the fact it had "a lot of different ideas" in it. With "Departures", the band knew what the intention was for the end of the song but where unsure about the beginning of the song. Rousseau brought up the idea of using "backward effects, playing things forward and then reversing them", as Told mentions.

== Release and touring ==
On November 11, 2012, Silverstein was teasing something for the date November 26. On November 26, This Is How the Wind Shifts was announced. "Stand Amid the Roar" was available for streaming a day later and released as a single on December 4. "Massachusetts" was released as a single on January 15, 2013. A North American tour was announced, with dates lasting from January 25 to March 2, 2013. Like Moths to Flames and Secrets were named as support acts. This Is How the Wind Shifts was available for streaming on February 1, and was released on February 5 by Hopeless. (Note: U.S. Hopeless HR764-2) Martin Wittfooth provided illustrations for the album. A box set edition with several 7" vinyl records was available; as was an Australian version of the album featuring three bonus tracks. (Note: Australia Roadrunner 5310563862; bonus tracks: "Massachusetts" (acoustic), "One Last Dance" (acoustic) and "Departures" (acoustic).) On the same day, a music video for "Massachusetts" was released. The band played in Europe in April. The band played in Japan as part of The AP Tour Japan in May, alongside The Used and Crossfaith. The band also played in Canada in June with The Wonder Years, prior to their stint on Warped Tour.

A lyric video for "I Will Illuminate" was released on September 24, 2013. The band toured North American from early October to early November on the Tracing Back Roots Tour, supporting We Came as Romans. A reissue of the album, with the new title This Is How the Wind Shifts: Addendum, was released on October 15. It features two new songs and two alternative versions of songs, alongside the Australian bonus tracks. A 7" vinyl version of Addendum was released the same day. (Note: U.S. Hopeless HR764-3) A day later, the music video for "A Better Place" was released. The band played in Europe from late November to mid-December and toured Canada again in January and February 2014. A music video was released for "On Brave Mountains We Conquer" on February 11. A mash-up video, of "This Is How" and "The Wind Shifts", was posted on March 31, filmed by the band's guitarist Josh Bradford. The band went on the Hollow Bodies Tour, a tour that ran through North American in April and May, mainly as a support act for Blessthefall. This was followed by a brief tour of Mexico in May. The band toured Europe again in June and July.

On November 23, 2023, the band commenced their North America tour celebrating the 10 year anniversary of This Is How the Wind Shifts. The band was supported by Stray From the Path and Avoid. In large part, the tour emphasized the significance of This Is How the Wind Shifts as a concept album; playing each parallel track back to back, interspersed with the band's greatest hits, as opposed to playing the album from start to finish.

== Reception ==
Professional ratings
Aggregate scores
Source	Rating
Metacritic	82/100
Review scores
Source	Rating
AbsolutePunk	(8.0/10)
AllMusic	3.5/5 stars
Alter the Press	4.5/5 stars
Alternative Press	4.5/5 stars
Rock Sound	(7/10)
Rockfreaks.net	(7/10)

This Is How the Wind Shifts was met with critical acclaim. At Metacritic, which assigns a normalized rating out of 100 to reviews from mainstream publications, the album received an average score of 82, based on four reviews, which indicates 'universal acclaim'.

In their staff review Sputnikmusic said the album was "one of the most passionate and ambitious albums the band has released in years" and that "Silverstein has managed to release yet another solid album that has rightfully earned its place alongside the band's best work". Alternative Press gave the album 4.5 out of 5 stars and said "the end result is Silverstein's career-best work and one of the best albums of the year thus far".

The album had charted on several charts in the U.S.: number 59 on the Billboard 200 chart, number 14 on the Alternative Albums chart, number 3 on the Hard Rock Albums chart, number 12 on the Independent Albums chart, and number 18 on the Rock Albums chart.

== Track listing ==
All songs written, performed, and arranged by Silverstein.

Side A
No.	Title	Length
1.	"Stand Amid the Roar"	3:04
2.	"On Brave Mountains We Conquer"	2:36
3.	"Massachusetts"	2:57
4.	"This Is How"	1:23
5.	"A Better Place"	3:08
6.	"Hide Your Secrets"	3:57
7.	"Arrivals"	1:16

Side B
No.	Title	Length
8.	"In a Place of Solace"	3:11
9.	"In Silent Seas We Drown"	3:30
10.	"California"	3:46
11.	"The Wind Shifts"	1:20
12.	"To Live and to Lose"	3:58
13.	"With Second Chances"	3:43
14.	"Departures"	2:47

Bonus tracks

Australian bonus tracks
No.	Title	Length
15.	"Massachusetts" (acoustic)
16.	"One Last Dance" (acoustic)
17.	"Departures" (acoustic)

Addendum additional tracks
No.	Title	Length
15.	"I Will Illuminate"	3:45
16.	"Kill the Lights"	3:51
17.	"Massachusetts" (acoustic)	3:35
18.	"One Last Dance" (acoustic)	1:36
19.	"Departures" (acoustic)	2:21
20.	"Arrivals" (voice note)	1:11
21.	"This Is How the Wind Shifts"	1:21
Total length:		55:16

== Personnel ==
Personnel per digital booklet.

Silverstein

- Josh Bradford – rhythm guitar
- Paul Koehler – drums, percussion
- Shane Told – lead vocals (tracks 1–6, 8–19, 21)
- Billy Hamilton – bass
- Paul Marc Rousseau – lead guitar; lead vocals (track 7, 20)

Production

- Jordan Valeriote – producer, engineer, mixing
- Paul Dickinson – drum tech
- Troy Glessener – mastering
- Martin Wittfooth – album illustrations
- Mike Ski – album layout

== Charts ==
Chart (2013)	Peak position
Australian Albums (ARIA)	95
US Billboard 200	59
US Independent Albums (Billboard)	12
US Top Alternative Albums (Billboard)	14
US Top Hard Rock Albums (Billboard)	3
US Top Rock Albums (Billboard)	18
