= Sleep Around =

Sleep Around may refer to:

- "Sleep Around", song by Silverstein from Short Songs
- "Sleep Around", song by Prince from Emancipation
