= Silverstein (band) =

Canadian rock band

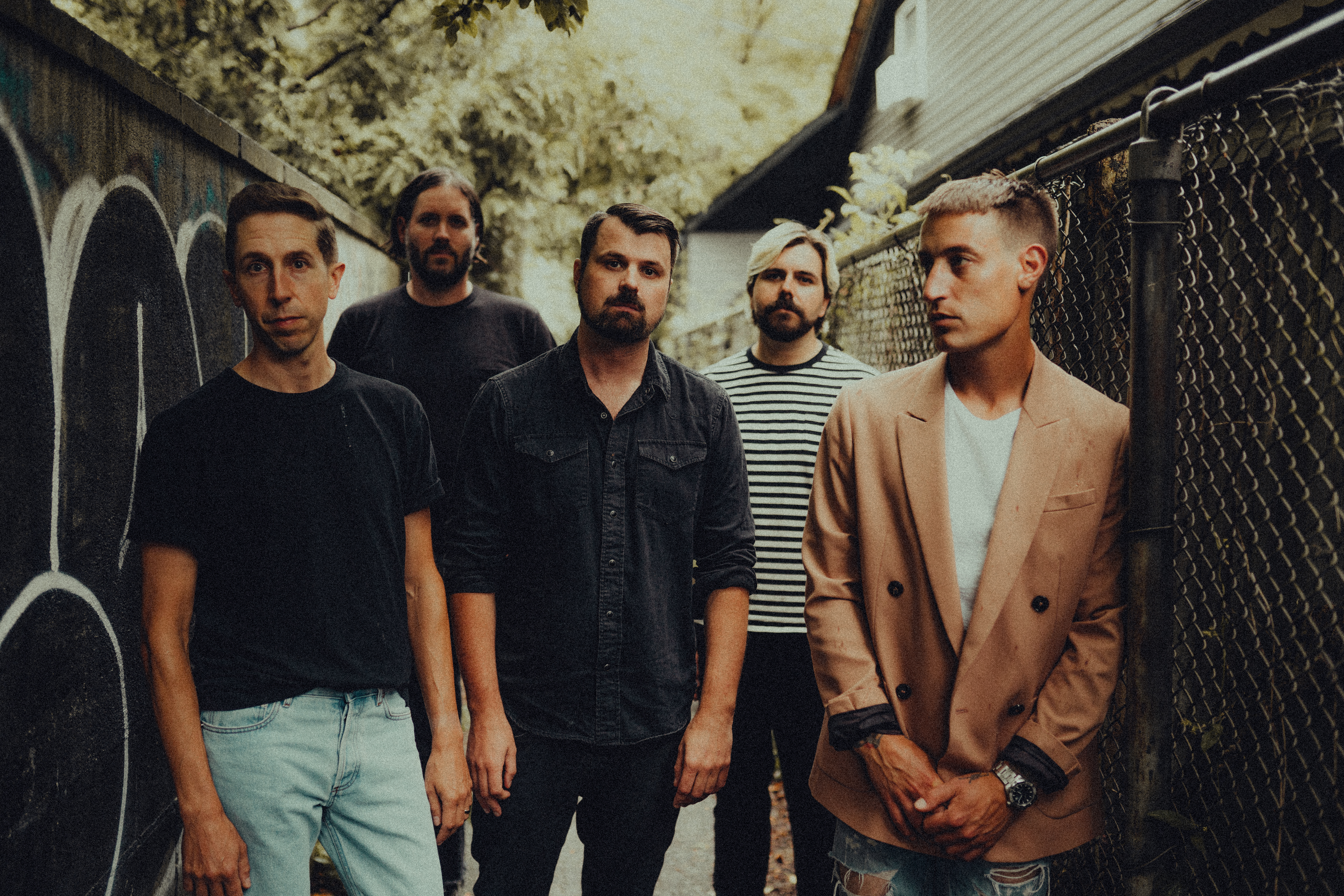
- Silverstein in 2020

Background information
- Origin: Burlington, Ontario, Canada
- Genres: Emo; post-hardcore; screamo; melodic hardcore; indie rock
- Works: Silverstein discography
- Years active: 2000–present
- Labels: Victory; Hopeless; Rise; UNFD
- Members: Josh Bradford; Paul Koehler; Shane Told; Billy Hamilton; Paul Rousseau
- Past members: Richard McWalter; Neil Boshart
- Website: silversteinmusic.com

Silverstein (/ˈsɪl.vər.stiːn/) is a Canadian rock band from Burlington, Ontario, formed in 2000. Their band name is a reference to the famous children's author Shel Silverstein, whom the band had admired and whose work they had read as children. They have released a total of thirteen studio albums, seven EPs, a compilation album and a live DVD/CD.

The band achieved moderate success with their second studio album, Discovering the Waterfront, which was nominated for a Juno Award and reached No. 34 on the Billboard 200 charts, with the following two albums charting at similar positions. Silverstein has sold over one million albums worldwide.

Silverstein's lineup remained unchanged from May 2001 to July 2012, then consisting of lead vocalist Shane Told, lead guitarist Neil Boshart, rhythm guitarist Josh Bradford, bassist Billy Hamilton, and drummer Paul Koehler. In September 2012, the band had announced that Neil Boshart had been fired and replaced by Paul Marc Rousseau, who also joined Billy Hamilton on backing vocals.

The band left long-time record label Victory Records in 2010. Following a period with Hopeless Records and another with Rise Records, they are now signed to UNFD. The band released their tenth studio album, A Beautiful Place to Drown, in March 2020. This was nominated for a 2021 Juno award in the "Best Rock Album" category. Pink Moon, the band's thirteenth studio album, was released in 2025.

== History ==
=== Early years and When Broken Is Easily Fixed (2000–2004) ===
Silverstein formed in February 2000. They self-released their first EP, Summer's Stellar Gaze, in August that year. After several lineup changes, the band acquired Billy Hamilton, a local fan who learned of the band's need for a bassist on the Internet message board "The 905 Board" (an Ontario area outreach board which used to be for local musicians). In December 2000, he joined the band after Told helped him learn the music for the songs. Following a rehearsal on Boxing Day (December 26) in 2000, he officially debuted with Silverstein. The next spring, original guitarist Richard McWalter left the band to move to Victoria, British Columbia, to study engineering. He was then replaced by Neil Boshart, childhood friend of Shane Told. The new lineup recorded a second EP, When the Shadows Beam, in preparation for their first tour in Eastern Canada. The band signed to Victory Records in October 2002 with a complete lineup as Hamilton attempted to complete his secondary education one semester early.

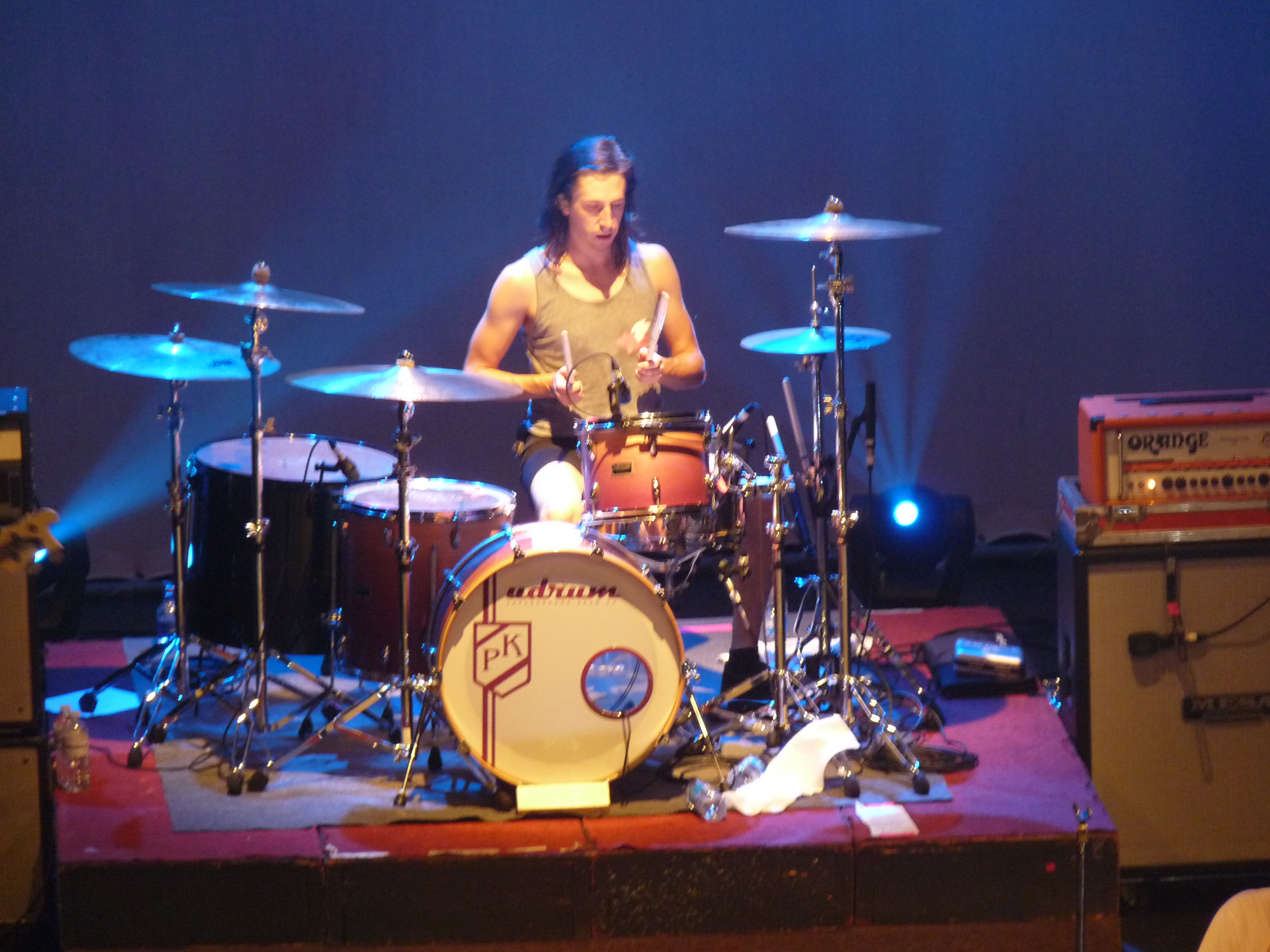
Drummer Paul Koehler in 2009 in Glace Bay, Nova Scotia

The following January the band went into the studio to record their first full-length debut album, When Broken Is Easily Fixed. It was recorded at Unity Gain and Mount Fairview studios, with producer Justin Koop and was released on May 20, 2003, through Victory Records. Six songs were re-recorded versions from Silverstein's previous EP's; Summer's Stellar Gaze and When The Shadows Beam. When Broken Is Easily Fixed sold over 200,000 copies, surpassing the expectations of the band.

=== Discovering the Waterfront (2005–2006) ===
In August 2005, the band's second studio album, Discovering the Waterfront, was released through Victory Records. It was the first album to be produced by Cameron Webb, and marked the beginning of a long relationship between the band and the American producer. It also marked a shift in sound from When Broken Is Easily Fixed, with faster-paced and more energetic songs, and with the band also incorporating more punk rock aspects into their music. Told's clean and unclean vocals had matured since their previous effort. Discovering The Waterfront opened the band up to a wider audience, with the music video for the first single "Smile in Your Sleep" receiving airplay on stations such as FUSE and IMF. The album sold 26,229 copies in its first week.

In 2005, the band performed on the Never Sleep Again Tour with bands such as Aiden, Hawthorne Heights and Bayside—a tour during which Bayside's drummer John "Beatz" Holohan was then killed in a road accident. The song, Here Today, Gone Tomorrow, on their following album, Arrivals and Departures, was written about Holohan's death, and his relationship with the band. In January–February 2006, they toured with fellow Canadians Simple Plan in Europe. They then toured Canada with the Taste of Chaos Tour, and also toured Europe, Japan, and Australia. They also performed at the Give It A Name festival at Earls Court & MEN Arena in Britain, opening the main stage.

The band also toured on the 2006 Vans Warped Tour, debuting on the main stage in support of Discovering the Waterfront and a compilation album, 18 Candles: The Early Years. The Early Years compiles the band's first two self-financed EPs along with various alternate versions of songs from their first two studio albums, including a dance remix of "Smile In Your Sleep" and an acoustic version of "My Heroine". Discovering the Waterfront was re-released in September 2006 with an extra song, the band's cover of Lifetime's "Rodeo Clown" and a DVD including music videos, a making of featurette and a live set from the Never Sleep Again Tour, in Chicago.

In 2006, Silverstein was nominated for a Juno Award in the "Best New Band" category, but lost to Bedouin Soundclash.

In the fall of 2006, they headlined the Never Shave Again Tour, along with Aiden, It Dies Today, and He Is Legend.

=== Arrivals & Departures (2007–2008) ===
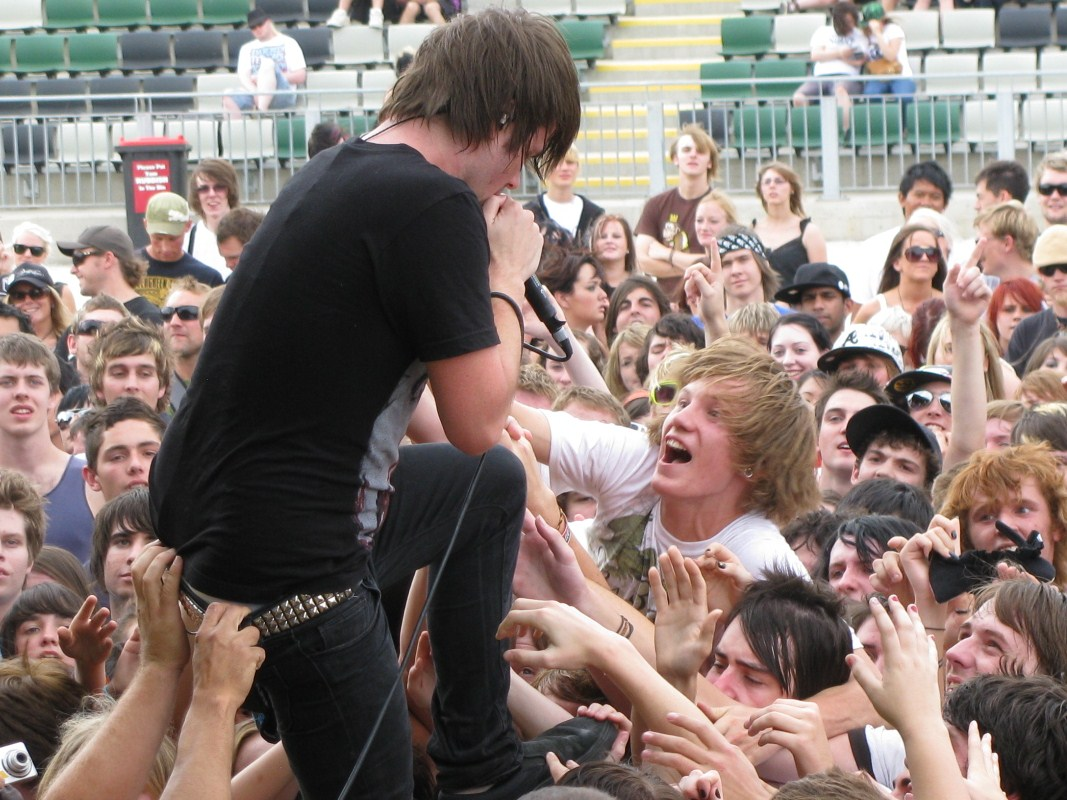
Told shown in 2009 performing in Melbourne.

The band's third full-length album, Arrivals And Departures, was released on July 3, 2007, and was designated by AP Magazine as one of the most eagerly anticipated CDs of 2007. Mark Trombino (Jimmy Eat World, Blink-182, Finch) produced the CD. The album sold 27,000 copies in its first week. Silverstein also contributed a new acoustic version of their song "Red Light Pledge" to the Punk Goes Acoustic 2 compilation, released May 8, 2007, through Fearless Records.

Upon completion of their third studio album, the band played a few shows in the spring, and then engaged in an all-summer tour with Rise Against. They also toured the United States in Fall 2007 with From Autumn to Ashes and then went on a month-long European tour with Blessthefall.

Following tours of Australia and Japan in January 2008, they played their first "Cross-Canada" headlining tour with Protest the Hero, Ill Scarlett and The Devil Wears Prada, which sold out across the country. In addition, they completed a U.S. tour with A Day to Remember, Protest the Hero and The Devil Wears Prada, during which Protest the Hero dropped off the tour and Pierce the Veil took over for them on a few show dates. After heavy touring for their album, Arrivals and Departures, in Canada, the US, the UK, and other areas in Europe during late 2007 and early 2008, which included the band's 1000th show in Paris, the band took the summer off. In a news post on their site, Silverstein's Paul Koehler said the band was "taking a bit of downtown time to write a new album!"

In October and November 2008, the band toured the United States (with a final show in Toronto) with Chiodos, Escape the Fate, Alesana, and A Skylit Drive, during which they performed the newly written song "Broken Stars", also made available as a demo on their Myspace page. The band played a South American tour in February followed by one show in Hawaii and festival dates in Australia.

=== A Shipwreck in the Sand (2009–2010) ===
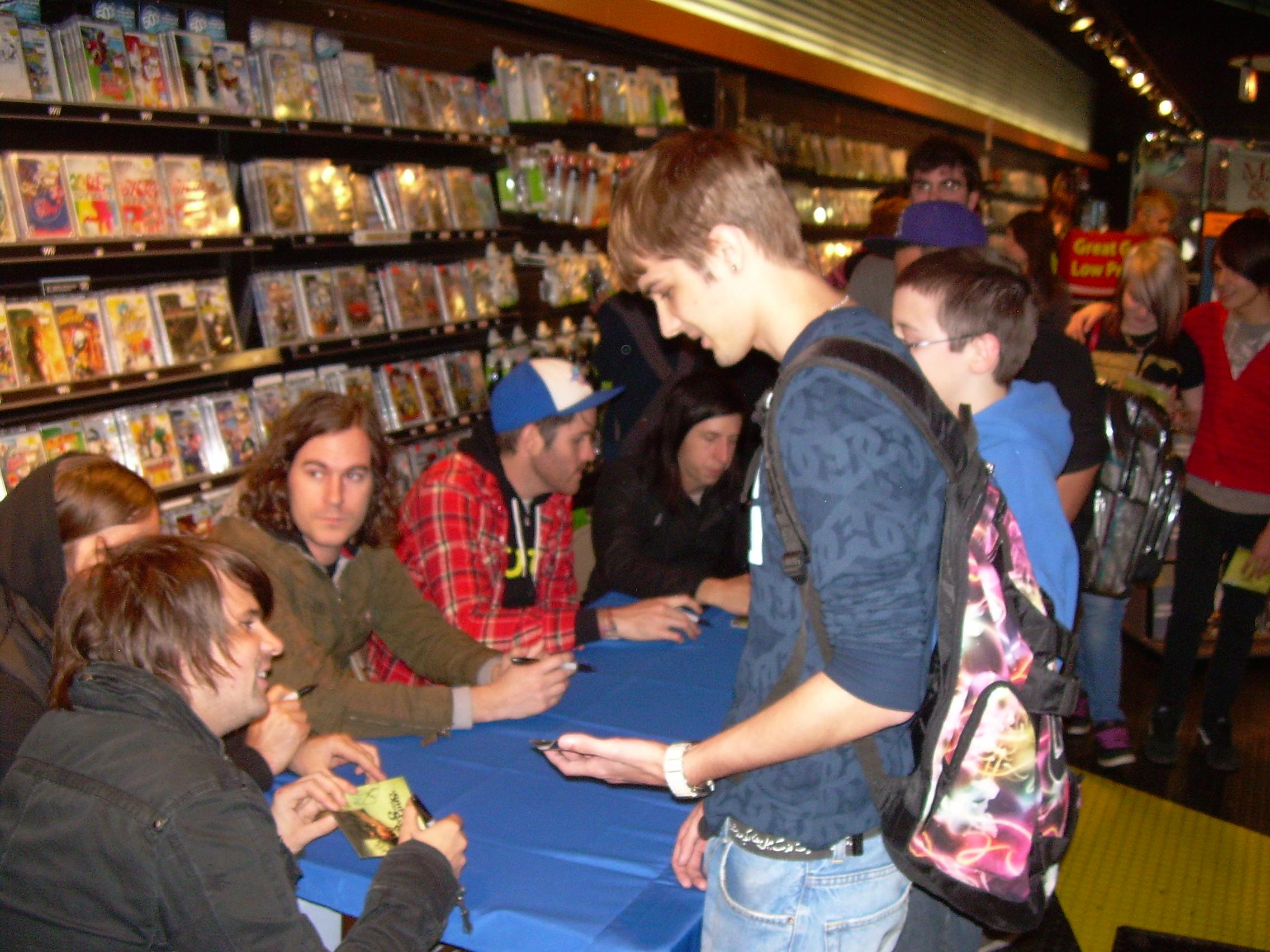
Silverstein at a fan signing at FYE in Chicago, April 28, 2009

On December 14, 2008, the band announced by Myspace bulletin that their fourth album would be released by March 31, 2009. The name of the new album, A Shipwreck in the Sand, was announced on January 29, 2009, when the band concluded a viral marketing campaign by announcing the track listing via an album website, also revealing it would be a concept album. Along with the demo of "Broken Stars", which the band had been performing during their final U.S. tour in support of "Arrivals and Departures", short clips of the songs "Vices", "Born Dead" and "American Dream" were made available on MySpace. On March 17, the band filmed a music video for "Vices" with director Robby Starbuck. Later, on March 23, 2009, the band posted the full album to stream on their official MySpace page.

A Shipwreck in the Sand was released on March 31, 2009, and sold nearly 17,000 copies in its first week. The iTunes version of the album includes four bonus cover songs, "Help!" (The Beatles cover), "Go Your Own Way" (Fleetwood Mac Cover), "Three Miles Down" (Saves The Day cover), and "Total Bummer" (NOFX cover).

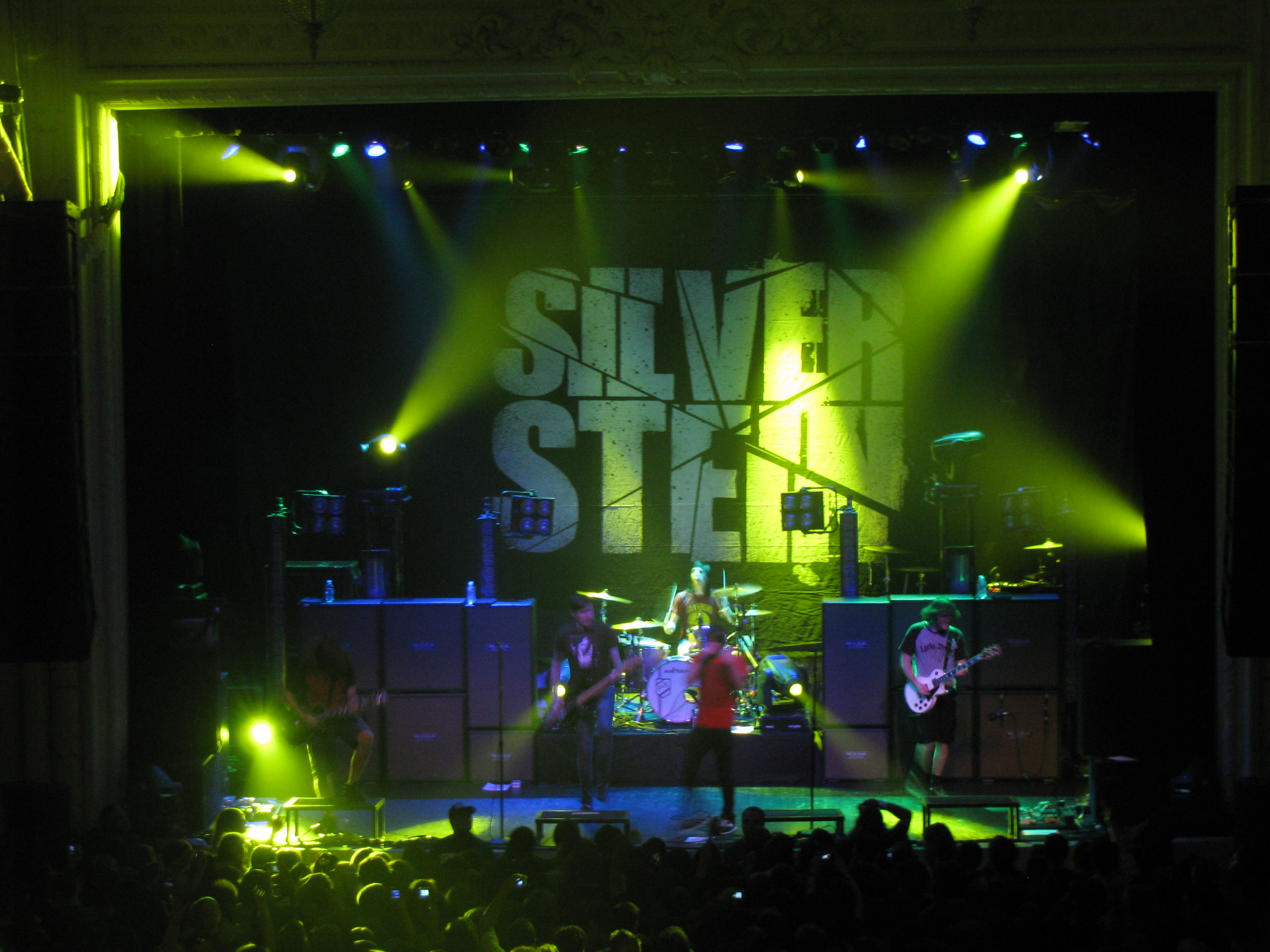
Silverstein performing in San Francisco, in October 2008.

Silverstein contributed a cover version of "Apologize", originally recorded by OneRepublic, to the Punk Goes Pop 2 compilation album.

After three shows in Ontario, the band embarked on a U.S. tour with Norma Jean, Before Their Eyes, and Blessthefall. The band then played several shows on the continent of Europe, and completed a UK tour supporting the Welsh band The Blackout, along with We Are The Ocean, Hollywood Undead, and The Urgency. The band completed a small-market tour in Ontario and the Midwestern United States, and played a brief stint on Warped Tour, followed by a show in Anchorage, Alaska, and a cross-Canada tour with A Day To Remember, Ten Second Epic, I Am Committing A Sin and an appearance on some dates by Kingdoms. They played Europe supporting Billy Talent starting November 16 in Bielefeld, Germany, through December 4, 2009, in Winterthur, Switzerland. They played four shows in Toronto from March 18 to 21, 2010, with each show featuring an album in full. They have also announced that they will be playing on the Toursick tour with A Day To Remember, August Burns Red, Enter Shikari, Veara, and Go Radio from March–May 2010.

On March 15, 2010, Silverstein announced through their official MySpace blog that they would be filming four exclusive Toronto shows, during which they would be playing their entire discography, to be released as a live DVD, revealed on April 23 to be titled Decade (Live at the El Mocambo) and was released on June 8, 2010.

The following summer Silverstein headlined the Scream It Like You Mean It tour, along with Emery, We Came As Romans, Dance Gavin Dance, I Set My Friends On Fire, Sky Eats Airplane, Ivoryline, and Close to Home. The first date of the tour also featured the bands The Devil Wears Prada, Miss May I, and Your Demise and took place at the Starland Ballroom.

=== Transitions, Rescue and Short Songs (2011–2012) ===
A quote from Shane Told on July 11, 2010, "We have a new album coming out real soon. We wish we could release it tonight, but are scheduled to release early next year." Told also said that the band has written 16 songs so far for the new record, and that the album will be released at some time next year.

On October 8, 2010, online rumors spread about their new album reportedly being titled Set This All Ablaze, and that it would again be released through Silverstein's long time label, Victory Records. The band later rejected the rumor that the new album will be titled Set This All Ablaze, although they did confirm their departure from Victory. However, as of the first week of October 2010, Silverstein's official website contained a banner stating Set This All Ablaze. On September 17, 2010, Silverstein were confirmed to be playing in Australia, for Soundwave, in 2011. This will be the band's second Soundwave Festival.

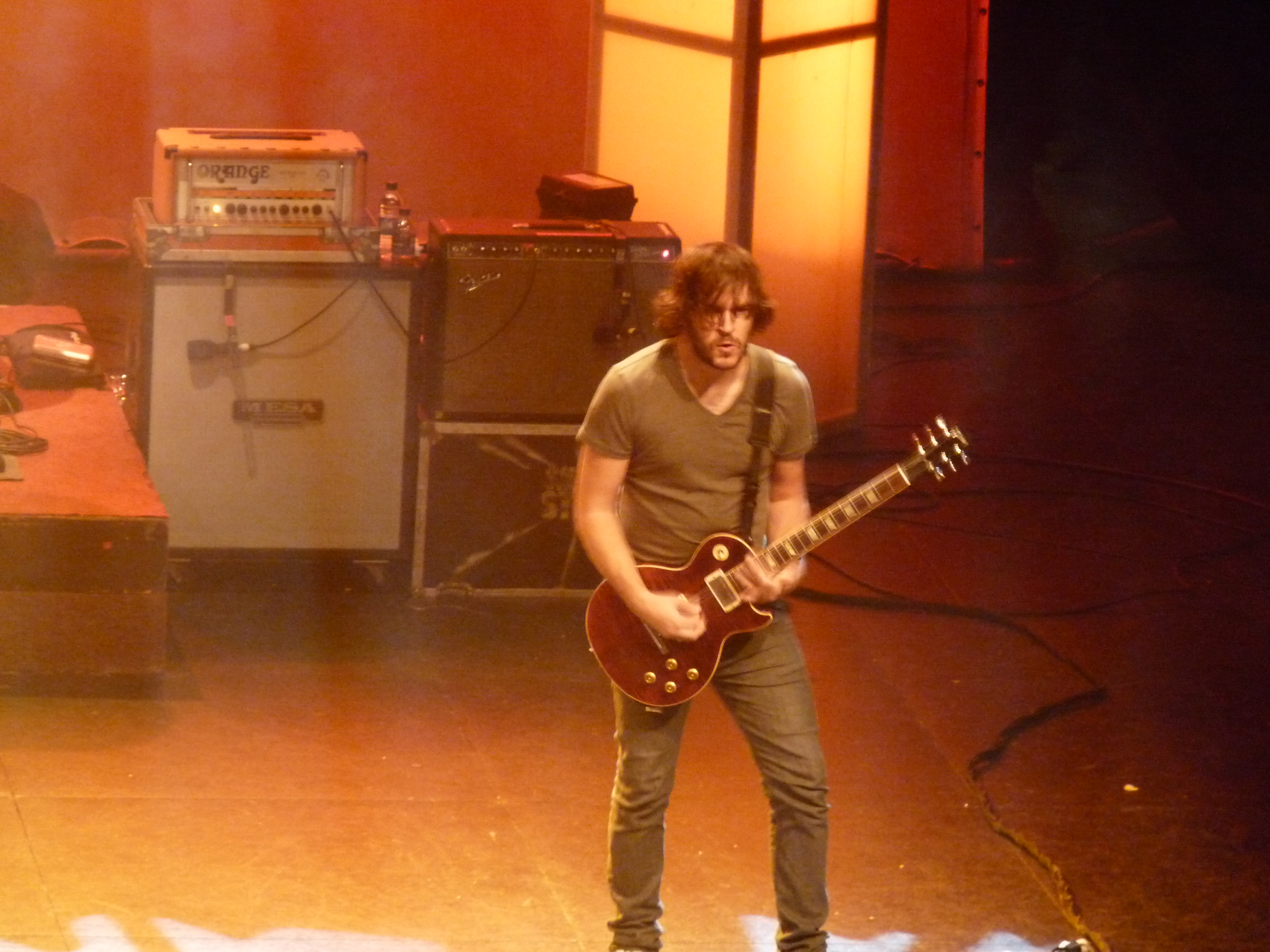
Former guitarist Neil Boshart (Glace Bay NS, October 3, 2009)

On November 15, Silverstein announced on Facebook that they have signed with Hopeless Records in the USA/Europe/Japan and with Universal Music in Canada. They also said that a new EP entitled Transitions will be released December 7 and will feature two songs from their new album coming out next year as well as three additional b-sides. In response to a fan on Tumblr, Shane Told described the new music as "a cross between Discovering the Waterfront and A Shipwreck in the Sand". On December 3, 2010, the band posted the first single, Sacrifice, off of the new EP. On February 4, 2011, the band played a free show in Toronto, with Robby Starbuck filming the entire performance for a music video for a song on the upcoming album titled The Artist. A guest vocalist was also present for the filming, who was later revealed to be Brendan Murphy from Counterparts. It was also revealed in response to a question on the band's Formspring that he will feature in the yet to be released studio version of the track. On February 9, 2011, Silverstein confirmed on their Facebook and Tumblr that their new album will be called Rescue. Shane Told also confirmed via the band's Formspring that Martin Wittfooth, the artist and friend of the band responsible for all four of the band's album artwork, had once again painted the album artwork. On February 15, 2011, the band posted the album artwork for Rescue on their official Facebook page. On February 19, 2011, 89X Radio aired a new song from the band named "Burning Hearts". On February 22, 2011, in response to a fan on Facebook, the band stated that they were not releasing a traditional lead single from the new album, and that they had made three music videos so far. They then went on to state that the new record has "tons of screaming and breakdowns". The album, Rescue, was released on April 26, 2011. Silverstein has also recorded a song featuring Ryan Key of Yellowcard called "Stay Posi" (Stay Positive) for the Take Action! Vol 10. Compilation.

On October 17, 2011, the band posted a new video on their YouTube channel about an upcoming release. They announced that are in process of recording a new album called Short Songs with producer Jordan Valeriote, scheduled for release on February 7, 2012. They also said that the EP will contain 22 songs under 90 seconds with half songs being covers of punk songs that influenced them. Silverstein contributed a cover version of "Runaway", originally recorded by Kanye West, to the Punk Goes Pop 4 compilation album, released on November 21, 2011. On December 1, 2011, the band streamed two songs off Short Songs, "SOS" and "Brookfield", as well as their covers of Green Day's "The Ballad of Wilhelm Fink" and NOFX's "It's My Job to Keep Punk Rock Elite" on PunkNews.

=== Boshart's departure and This Is How the Wind Shifts (2012–2014) ===
The band announced that they would be playing 10 shows in August in the United States and Canada supporting Short Songs during which they would play the album in its entirety as well as a greatest hits set. Called the SHORT TOUR, it ran from August 16 to 26, 2012. On the SHORT TOUR, the band announced that they would release a new album in 2013. On September 25, 2012, the band announced that Neil Boshart had left the band after 11 years. He was replaced by ex-I Am Committing A Sin guitarist Paul Marc Rousseau. Told claimed that Boshart's replacement was due to many years of growing apart, stating that there was very little contribution from him on Short Songs.

On November 26, 2012, the band announced that their sixth studio album would be titled This Is How the Wind Shifts and would be released on February 5, 2013. A few hours later they also released the first single, titled "Stand Amid The Roar". On March 8, 2013, the band announced they would be playing the entire Warped Tour 2013. On April 20, 2013, they released a split 7-inch EP with August Burns Red for Record Store Day, covering Coming Clean by The Get Up Kids. The release was limited to 500 vinyl copies. On May 20, 2013, they released a re-recorded version of "Smashed Into Pieces" for the 10-year anniversary of When Broken Is Easily Fixed. On September 24, 2013, Silverstein announced This Is How The Wind Shifts: Addendum and released a new song entitled I Will Illuminate. The re-release was released on October 15, 2013, and brought the total track list of This Is How The Wind Shifts to 21. It contains two new songs, the acoustic songs from the deluxe version of the album, a "voice note" version of Arrivals and a mix of the two songs This Is How and The Wind Shifts.

=== I Am Alive in Everything I Touch (2015–2016) ===
Silverstein began 2015 with a 10th anniversary tour in celebration of their 2005 sophomore album Discovering the Waterfront. The tour will be 38-dates from January through February across North America. The band's seventh studio album I Am Alive In Everything I Touch was released on May 19, 2015. Coinciding with the album's announcement, Silverstein released a music video for the track "A Midwestern State of Emergency."

=== Dead Reflection (2016–2018) ===
On October 13, 2016, Silverstein announced the streaming "Ghost" on SiriusXM. Later that day, they released the music video on YouTube and the song on iTunes, stating on social media that the upcoming studio album will be released in 2017. On May 18, 2017, Silverstein released the second single from the record, "Retrograde", as well as announced the track listing and title of the record, "Dead Reflection", which was released on July 14, 2017. Dead Reflection was released worldwide on July 14, 2017.

=== Redux: The First Ten Years and LIVE: When Broken 15 Easily Fixed (2018–2019) ===
In late 2018, Silverstein embarked on the When Broken 15 Easily Fixed Tour, a tour celebrating the 15th anniversary of the band's debut album When Broken Is Easily Fixed by playing the album in its entirety plus a set of greatest hits. The tour would run throughout the US and Canada from November 9, 2018, to January 31, 2019, with support from Hawthorne Heights, As Cities Burn, and Capstan.

On February 18, 2019, Silverstein announced a retrospective album titled, Redux: The First Ten Years, which features newly recorded versions of selected songs from their first four studio albums. It was released on April 12, 2019. On November 11, 2019, Silverstein announced a live album, LIVE: When Broken 15 Easily Fixed, which features live versions of all ten tracks from the band's debut album When Broken Is Easily Fixed recorded throughout the band's When Broken 15 Easily Fixed Tour. This marks the second self-released full-length album from Silverstein in 2019, after Redux: The First Ten Years. It was released on November 29, 2019.

=== A Beautiful Place to Drown (2019–2020) ===
On June 27, 2019, Silverstein released a new single featuring Beartooth's vocalist Caleb Shomo titled "Burn It Down", followed by another single on January 8 titled "Infinite", featuring Underoath's clean vocalist/drummer Aaron Gillespie. On March 3, 2020, the band released another new single titled "Madness", featuring Princess Nokia, and A Beautiful Place to Drown was released on March 6, 2020.

=== Misery Made Me (2021–2023) ===
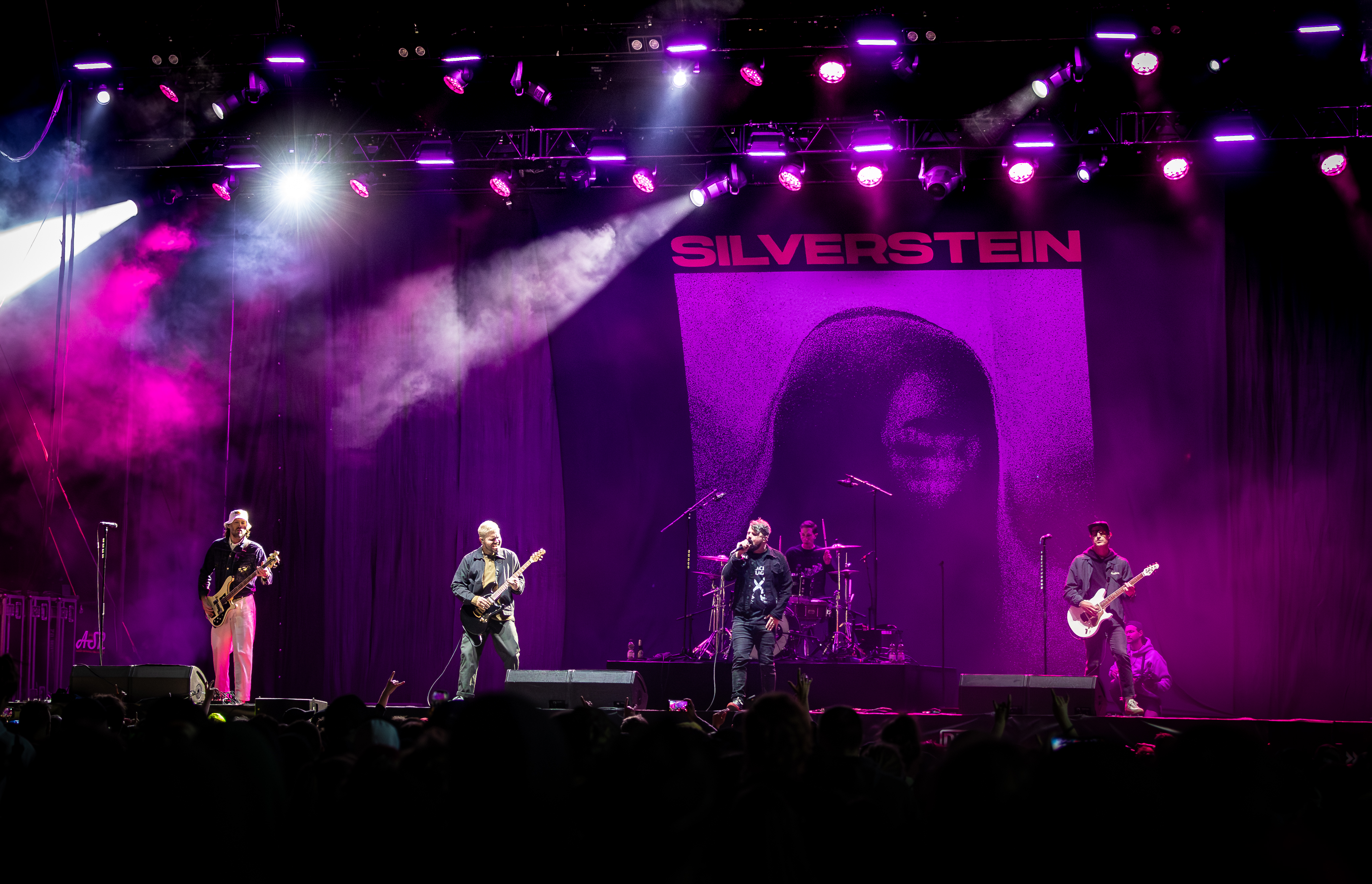
Silverstein live at Rock am Ring 2023

On April 15, 2021, the band released the single "Bankrupt", followed by another single on November 18, 2021, "It's Over". After a one-week teasing period, the band released another single titled "Ultraviolet" on February 24, 2022. Alongside the single, the band announced their next studio album, Misery Made Me, which was released on May 6, 2022.

On December 2, 2022, a 26-track remixed and remastered version of their third studio album Arrivals & Departures was published to streaming services. Tracks 1-13 are remixed/remastered, and tracks 14-26 are the original mixes. It was originally released on vinyl for the 2022 Record Store Day, limited to 3900 copies.

=== Antibloom and Pink Moon (2024–present) ===
On August 22, 2024, the band released a single, titled "Skin & Bones", which they followed with "Confession", released on October 17, 2024. In the same year the band announced a duology album. Antibloom, the first part, was released on February 21, 2025, with Pink Moon, the second part, released on September 19, 2025. The band performed at the Sonic Temple music festival in Columbus, Ohio in earlier that year in May. The band will tour in 2026 with support from Story of the Year and Origami Angel.

== Musical style and influences ==
Silverstein has been described as "musically schizophrenic." The band's "hybrid sound" has been characterized as a "screamo-tinged brand of melodic hardcore", incorporating various elements of "shimmering" emo, punk rock, "gritty, hot-blooded" post-hardcore, and "soaring" indie rock. Critics have also made note of elements of math rock, heavy metal, hardcore punk, emo pop, skate punk and power pop apparent in the band's style. The band's heavy end has drawn comparisons to Suicidal Tendencies and Motörhead, while its pop sensibilities have drawn comparisons to Dashboard Confessional. It has been suggested that the band's music could potentially help "introduce [hardcore punk] to the pop legion," while also being characterized as "music to scare your parents with." PopMatters stated that "in emo-ness and heaviness, Silverstein represents a middle ground between Jimmy Eat World and Killswitch Engage.

The band's music makes use of both screaming and clean vocals, both of which are provided by lead vocalist Shane Told, who alternates between the techniques. Greg Prato of AllMusic stated the opinion that the band sounds like it has two vocalists rather than just one, adding that they "refus[e] to align themselves completely with either hard rock or hardcore." Additionally, the band's music incorporates frequent breakdowns.

The band's influences include Mineral, Knapsack, the Get Up Kids, Grade, At the Drive-In, Orchid, Green Day, Rites Of Spring, Sunny Day Real Estate, NOFX, Rancid, Lagwagon, and Pennywise.

== Band members ==
Current

- Josh Bradford – rhythm guitar (2000–present)
- Paul Koehler – drums, percussion (2000–present)
- Shane Told – lead vocals (2000–present); bass guitar (2000)
- Billy Hamilton – bass guitar, backing vocals (2000–present)
- Paul Marc Rousseau – lead guitar, backing vocals (2012–present)

Former

- Richard McWalter – lead guitar (2000–2001)
- Neil Boshart – lead guitar (2001–2012), backing vocals (2001–2004)

Timeline

== Discography ==
Studio albums

- When Broken Is Easily Fixed (2003)
- Discovering the Waterfront (2005)
- Arrivals & Departures (2007)
- A Shipwreck in the Sand (2009)
- Rescue (2011)
- Short Songs (2012)
- This Is How the Wind Shifts (2013)
- I Am Alive in Everything I Touch (2015)
- Dead Reflection (2017)
- A Beautiful Place to Drown (2020)
- Misery Made Me (2022)
- Antibloom (2025)
- Pink Moon (2025)

== Concert tours ==
- (2005) Vans Warped Tour
- (2005) The Never Sleep Again Tour
- (2006) Still Not Getting Any... (Europe) with Simple Plan.
- (2006) Vans Warped Tour
- (2006) Taste of Chaos
- (2006) The Never Shave Again Tour
- (2007) The Sufferer & the Witness with Rise Against.
- (2008) The Best Damn World Tour (Japan) with Avril Lavigne.
- (2010) Decade tour (Ten Year Anniversary)
- (2011) Take Action Tour
- (2012) SHORT TOUR
- (2013) Tracing Back Roots Tour with We Came As Romans, Chunk! No, Captain Chunk!, The Color Morale and Dangerkids.
- (2013) Vans Warped Tour
- (2013) This Is How The Wind Shifts tour
- (2014) Hollowbodies Tour Blessthefall, The Amity Affliction. SECRETS, Heartist
- (2015) Discovering the Waterfront Tour – 10th Anniversary with Beartooth, Hands Like Houses and My Iron Lung.
- (2015) Vans Warped Tour
- (2015) Silverstein & Senses Fail Tour 2015 Co-Headline with Senses Fail, featuring Capsize, and Hundredth
- (2016) Silverstein Tour 2016 with Being as an Ocean, Emarosa, Coldrain, Rarity, Youth Decay, Cardinals Pride
- (2016) Rise Up Tour- The Devil Wears Prada, Memphis May Fire, Like Moths to Flames
- (2017) Youth Authority – Good Charlotte and Palaye Royale
- (2017) South Bound with The Word Alive and For the Fallen Dreams
- (2017) Vans Warped Tour
- (2018) Get Free Tour- with Tonight Alive, Broadside and Picturesque
- (2019) When Broken Is Easily Fixed 15 Year Anniversary Tour- with Hawthorne Heights, As Cities Burn, and Capstan
- (2019) 10 Years of Constellations – with August Burns Red and Silent Planet
- (2020) 20 Year Anniversary Tour – with Four Year Strong
- (2022) Silverstein & The Amity Affliction Co-Headline with The Amity Affliction
- (2023) Misery Made Made Me Tour
- (2023) THE WIND SHIFTS TOUR 10 years
- (2025) 25 Years Of Noise with Split Chain, Arm's Length, and Thursday
- (2026) Vans Warped Tour
- (2026) Camp Screamo co-headline with Story of the Year featuring Origami Angel
- (2026) Camp Screamo 2 co-headline with Story of the Year featuring Stand Atlantic, and Footballhead

== Awards and nominations ==
Juno Awards
Year	Nominee / work	Award	Result
2006	Silverstein	New Group of the Year	Nominated
2021	A Beautiful Place to Drown	Rock Album of the Year	Nominated
2026	Antibloom	Heavy Metal Album of the Year	Nominated
