= Dead Reflection =

Studio album by Silverstein
- Released: July 14, 2017
- Recorded: Late 2016 - Early 2017
- Genre: Post-hardcore; emo
- Length: 41:20
- Label: Rise, New Damage
- Producer: Derek Hoffman; Paul Marc Rousseau

Silverstein chronology
I Am Alive in Everything I Touch (2015)	Dead Reflection (2017)	Redux: The First Ten Years (2019)

Singles from Dead Reflection
- 1. "Retrograde" Released: May 18, 2017; 2. "The Afterglow/Aquamarine" Released: September 28, 2018 (digital) January 11, 2019 (physical)

Professional ratings
Aggregate scores
Source	Rating
Metacritic	57/100
Review scores
Source	Rating
Noizze	6.5/10
PopMatters	6/10 stars
Punknews.org	3.5/5 stars
The Spill Magazine	3/5 stars
Rock Sound	7/10

Dead Reflection is the ninth studio album by the Canadian post-hardcore band Silverstein, released on July 14, 2017 through Rise Records worldwide and New Damage Records in Canada. It was the band's last album on Rise Records.

== Background and recording ==
In December 2016, Shane Told spoke to Alternative Press about their single "Ghost" and the then-upcoming album Dead Reflection.

We actually just released a new song, 'Ghost.' We had three months off in the summertime to just sit still, and we've never been a band that takes breaks. We're always touring; when we’re not touring, we're writing and recording. So it was decided, our record doesn't need to come out until next summer, let's see if we can put together a song and release a single. That's something that we've never done before. We spent a lot of time in the studio on one track, and it's kind of setting up the next album because we actually went with a new producer—Derek Hoffman out of Toronto—and we had 10 different people mix the song. We had 10 mixers from all different walks of life—some pretty big names—mix the song and then we picked the mix that we liked the best. Hopefully that's going to be the team that's going to make the new Silverstein. So it was almost like the warm-up for the record were going to record early next year.

In an interview with Alternative Press on June 15, 2017, Told detailed what drove the writing of Dead Reflection:

Going through the last year of my life, I've learned so much about myself, and at a relatively old age I think that’s been really productive for me. Despite going through these dark times, I've ended up in a place where I've never been happier — I've never felt more confident and alive. That's a great message to pass on to people; it doesn't matter whether you're a teenager or in your 30s — you can find that happiness, and sometimes you have to go through hell to find it. That's what this record is about. The element of hope has always been in our band; we want to preach positivity, it's just that sometimes you have to go through darkness to get there. At the core, that's what Dead Reflection is about.

On June 28, 2017, Silverstein released a studio documentary to give fans more information about the album and the making of it.

== Release ==
On October 13, 2016, Silverstein debuted the stand-alone single "Ghost" on Sirius XM Faction, and released a music video for the song. "Ghost" is featured on Dead Reflection. On May 18, 2017, Silverstein announced the title of the album, and debuted the first single, "Retrograde", with its own music video. On June 15, 2017, Silverstein premiered "Lost Positives" through Alternative Press' website, where Told and Paul Marc Rousseau discussed the song and album in a short interview. On July 6, 2017, Silverstein released the track "Whiplash" through Rise Records' YouTube channel. "Mirror Box" was released on July 10.

== Track listing ==
No.	Title	Length
1.	"Last Looks"	2:53
2.	"Retrograde"	3:11
3.	"Lost Positives"	3:42
4.	"Ghost"	3:31
5.	"Aquamarine"	3:44
6.	"Mirror Box"	3:48
7.	"Demons"	3:02
8.	"The Afterglow"	3:08
9.	"Cut and Run"	2:52
10.	"Secret's Safe"	3:43
11.	"Whiplash"	2:58
12.	"Wake Up"	4:48
Total length:		41:20

== Charts ==
Chart (2017)	Peak position
Australian Hitseekers Albums (ARIA)	4
Canadian Albums (Billboard)	64
UK Rock & Metal Albums (OCC)	35
US Billboard 200	46
US Independent Albums (Billboard)	1
US Indie Store Album Sales (Billboard)	21
US Top Alternative Albums (Billboard)	9
US Top Hard Rock Albums (Billboard)	3
US Top Rock Albums (Billboard)	8
