= Shane Told =

Canadian musician (born 1981)

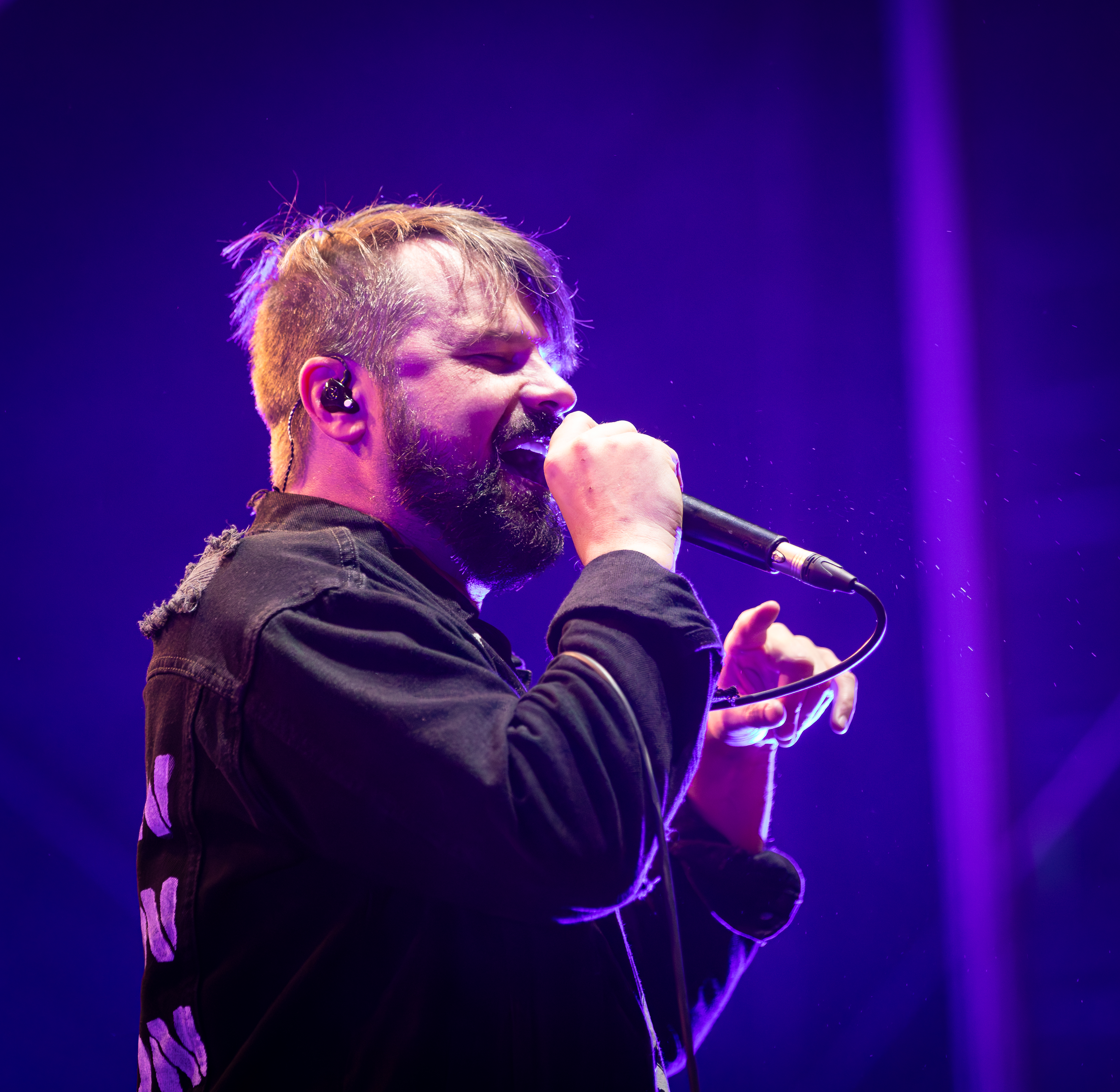
- Told performing in Rock am Ring in 2023

Background information
- Born: Shane Matthew Told; February 13, 1981 (age 45); Scarborough, Toronto, Canada.
- Genres: Post-hardcore; pop-punk; melodic hardcore; emo; hardcore punk; screamo; metalcore; punk rock; midwest emo; indie rock
- Occupations: Singer; musician; songwriter
- Instruments: Vocals, guitar, bass, keyboards, piano
- Years active: 2000–present
- Member of: Silverstein
- Formerly of: Jerk Circus

Shane Matthew Told (born February 13, 1981) is a Canadian musician known as the lead vocalist of Canadian post-hardcore band Silverstein.

Told hosts a podcast called Lead Singer Syndrome.

He announced a solo album in 2015.

== Biography ==
Born in Scarborough, Ontario, a small town in Ontario just outside Toronto, at the age of six he moved with his family to Oakville, Canada when his father found a new job. He currently lives in Toronto. Shane became interested in music when he was 10 years old, thanks to his sister who listened to Black Album by Metallica, which, he said, he immediately felt a connection with upon first listening, as if he had already listened to that CD a million times. He began playing his father's acoustic guitar, and then bought an electric one. He also taught himself to sing (including screaming). He attended White Oaks Secondary School in Oakville, then enrolled in 2000 at the University of Guelph following courses in music, genetics and molecular biology, but dropped out in April 2003 to devote himself full time to music. He approached punk rock thanks to groups like Fugazi and Minor Threat, and became a regular visitor to the local scene.

== Musical career ==
Told's first band was a punk rock group called Jerk Circus. The band, which rehearsed in the basement of Shane's parents' house, achieved a fair amount of success among the local public, with its first album Never Mind the Suburbs in 2001, followed by the EP Everything Is a Travesty with You. He covered "When I Come Around" by Green Day at his first show. In 2002, the band decided to split up at the end of the year, because the members wanted to follow new paths (many of them had joined a ska project that was taking up a lot of time). Shane was among the founders of Silverstein at the age of 19, in 2000. The band was born as a side project of the members who had already played in other local bands.

In 2000, the band released their first self-produced EP, "Summer's Stellar Gaze." Initially, guitarist Josh Bradford was dissatisfied with Shane, believing Silverstein needed a screamer. However, Shane decided to learn how to scream, and with this new style, the band released "When the Shadows Beam" two years later, signing them to Victory Records. During the band's first tour with Safeway Home, Shane sold his car to buy a Dodge van for the band. With their new label, Silverstein released their first album, When Broken Is Easily Fixed, in 2003, which began to gain attention in the emo scene. However, it was with their next album, Discovering the Waterfront (2005), that the band achieved success, thanks to songs such as "Smile in Your Sleep" and "My Heroine" which achieved considerable success worldwide.

Towards the end of the year, Shane announced that he had created his own label, called Verona Records, to help young and talented bands in his area trying to emerge. The first contract was made with an Ontario band called "Dead and Divine". That same year, he appeared as a guest vocalist on the song "Pictures of You" by No Assembly Required.

== Artistry ==
Told's vocal style incorporates both melodic singing and screaming, usually alternating between the two throughout a track. The first time he was exposed to harsh vocals was through the song "Angel of Death" by thrash metal band Slayer. His first experience with screaming was in a contest held at Warped Tour. To avoid irritating his housemates, Told said he would travel to remote areas to practice screaming in his car. He stated that this habit attracted police attention on several occasions, though these encounters reportedly passed without further incident.

== Personal life ==
Told enjoys hockey and pinball as hobbies.
