= Rescue (Silverstein album) =

Studio album by Silverstein
- Released: April 26, 2011
- Recorded: 2009, June–September 2010
- Genre: Post-hardcore; emo
- Length: 39:45
- Label: Hopeless
- Producer: Jordan Valeriote

Silverstein chronology
Transitions (2010)	Rescue (2011)	Short Songs (2012)

Rescue is the fifth studio album by the Canadian post-hardcore band Silverstein. It was released on April 26, 2011, the first full-length album to be released through Hopeless Records.

== Recording ==
Rescue was produced by Jordan Valeriote and mixed by Cameron Webb. (Note: Webb previously worked with the band producing Discovering the Waterfront (2005) and A Shipwreck in the Sand (2009), and mixing Decade (Live at the El Mocambo) (2010) and Transitions (2010)) The album was recorded over a longer period of time than any of their other albums, taking place over two separate sessions over a year apart, which the band has since said caused the album to have a more ‘disjointed’ feeling. Initial sessions for the album took place in the spring of 2009 shortly after the release of their fourth full-length album A Shipwreck in the Sand. The release of Shipwreck completed their contract with Victory Records and they recorded about 5-6 new songs that would end up on Rescue to shop to new record labels, ultimately settling on Hopeless Records. Three of these demos were included on the deluxe version of the album.

== Music and lyrics ==
The material on Rescue was described by Told as "a cross between Discovering and Shipwreck".

Rescue contains two songs from the band's previously released EP Transitions.

== Release and reception ==
Professional ratings
Review scores
Source	Rating
AbsolutePunk	3.5/5 stars
Alternative Press	4/5 stars
Ultimate Guitar Archive	(7.7/10)

A music video was released for the song "Sacrifice". On February 5, 2011, the band played a free show in Toronto, with Robby Starbuck filming the event for a music video for the song "The Artist", released on March 28. Frontman, Shane Told revealed that a video will also be released for the song "Burning Hearts". Told also announced that there will be a 7" vinyl release for "The Artist" on their Record Store Day and it will have 3 exclusive covers as B-sides along with there being an iTunes exclusive track for the album as well. In April and May, the band co-headlined the Take Action Tour with Bayside. They were supported by Polar Bear Club, The Swellers and Texas in July.

== Track listing ==
All songs written and performed by Silverstein, with specific writers for each track.

No.	Title	Writer(s)	Length
1.	"Medication"	Neil Boshart, Josh Bradford, Billy Hamilton, Paul Koehler, Shane Told	4:29
2.	"Sacrifice"	Told	2:36
3.	"Forget Your Heart"	Told	3:45
4.	"Intervention"	Boshart, Told	3:06
5.	"Good Luck with Your Lives"	Boshart, Bradford, Hamilton, Koehler, Told	3:24
6.	"Texas Mickey" (featuring Anthony Raneri of Bayside)	Boshart, Bradford, Hamilton, Koehler, Told	2:41
7.	"The Artist" (featuring Brendan Murphy of Counterparts)	Bradford, Told	3:05
8.	"Burning Hearts"	Boshart, Told	3:02
9.	"Darling Harbour"	Bradford, Told	2:53
10.	"Live to Kill"	Told	2:35
11.	"Replace You"	Told	3:24
12.	"In Memory Of..."	Boshart, Told	4:45
Total length:			39:45

CD version bonus tracks
No.	Title	Length
13.	"Burning Hearts" (Acoustic)	3:27
14.	"Texas Mickey" (Demo)	3:03
15.	"Intervention" (Demo)	3:11
16.	"In Memory Of..." (Demo)	4:39
17.	"Dancing on My Grave"	3:16
18.	"Replace You" (Acoustic)	3:42

Australian and iTunes bonus track
No.	Title	Length
19.	"Forget Your Heart" (Piano version)	3:34

Japanese limited edition bonus tracks
No.	Title	Length
13.	"Forget Your Heart" (Piano version)	3:34
14.	"Texas Mickey" (Demo)	3:03
15.	"Intervention" (Demo)	3:11
16.	"In Memory Of..." (Demo)	4:39
17.	"Hearts" (American Nightmare cover)	1:05
18.	"Pits + Poisoned Apples" (Kid Dynamite cover)	0:47
19.	"Fuck the Border" (Propagandhi cover)	1:30

== Personnel ==
Personnel per digital booklet.

Silverstein

- Shane Told – lead vocals, keyboards, piano on (Forget Your Heart (Piano version))
- Paul Koehler – drums, percussion
- Josh Bradford – rhythm guitar
- Neil Boshart – lead guitar
- Billy Hamilton – bass, backing vocals

Additional musicians

- Anna Jarvis – cello
- Paul-Marc Rousseau, Ben Bradford, Josh Bradford, Neil Boshart, Billy Hamilton, Shane Told – gang vocals
- Anthony Raneri – additional vocals on track 6
- Brendan Murphy – additional vocals on track 7

Production

- Jordan Valeriote – producer, engineer
- Cameron Webb – mixing
- Joah Carvalho – mastering
- Inaam Haq – assistant engineer at Cherry Beach
- Shaun Gowman – drum tech
- Martin Wittfooth – artwork
- Brooks Reynolds – band photo
- Sons of Nero – layout

== Charts ==
Chart (2011)	Peak position
Australian Hitseekers Albums (ARIA)	3
Canadian Albums (Nielsen SoundScan)	29
US Billboard 200	38
US Independent Albums (Billboard)	5
US Top Alternative Albums (Billboard)	6
US Top Rock Albums (Billboard)	11
