= Arrivals & Departures =

Studio album by Silverstein
- Released: July 2, 2007
- Recorded: March 2007
- Genres: Post-hardcore; pop-punk; screamo; emo
- Length: 42:01
- Label: Victory
- Producer: Mark Trombino

Silverstein chronology
| 18 Candles: The Early Years (2006) | Arrivals & Departures (2007) | A Shipwreck in the Sand (2009) |

Singles from Arrivals & Departures
- 1. "If You Could See into My Soul" Released: June 26, 2007; 2. "Still Dreaming" Released: May 5, 2008

Arrivals & Departures is the third studio album by the Canadian post-hardcore band Silverstein. It was released on July 2, 2007, on Victory Records. Silverstein promoted the album with music videos for the tracks "If You Could See Into My Soul" and "Still Dreaming".

== Background and recording ==
Following touring the U.S. on The Never Shave Again tour in November 2006, Silverstein announced they planned to work on a new album in 2007. Throughout the winter, the band spent time writing songs.

The band began recording Arrivals & Departures with producer Mark Trombino in March 2007. Guitarist Josh Bradford said Trombino's production style went well with the band's vision. The album was influenced by Alexisonfire's Crisis (2006). Rob Sayce of Rock Sound said the band followed Alexisonfire lead and moved away from their roots "in search of a more focused approach". As a result, the album alienated some of the band's fans.

...People didn't seem to latch on to it as much as Discovering the Waterfront. And I guess in a way I understand that because Arrivals & Departures was personal. And in terms of production we went for a stripped down rock record. It wasn't a super slick record like Discovering The Waterfront. There weren't a lot of guitar tracks, the drum tracks were pretty raw sounding and there wasn't a lot of backing vocals. It was a rock record. -Shane Told

== Release ==
In May 2007, Silverstein appeared at The Bamboozle festival. As Arrivals & Departures was announced on May 15, 2007, the track listing and artwork was revealed. On June 1, "Sound of the Sun" was made available for streaming on their Myspace profile. "If You Could See into My Soul" was made available for streaming on June 19, before being released to radio a week later. From mid June to mid September, the group went a North American tour with Rise Against and Comeback Kid. Arrivals & Departures was initially planned for release in May before eventually being released on July 3 through Victory. (Note: U.S. Victory VR350) A Best Buy edition of the album featured two bonus tracks: "Rain Will Fall" and "Falling Down". (Note: U.S. Victory VR379) A 7" vinyl, featuring "If You Could See into My Soul", was available to those who pre-ordered the album; limited to 3,500 copies. (Note: U.S. Victory V3501) The B-side features an etching of the album's artwork.

On July 19, a music video was released for "If You Could See Into My Soul". In October and November, the group went on a headlining tour of the U.S. with support from From Autumn to Ashes, Strike Anywhere, A Day to Remember and Dance Gavin Dance. They ended the year with an appearance at the Saints & Sinners Festival. In January 2008, the group went on a tour of Australia with Set Your Goals. In February and March, the band went on a US tour alongside the Devil Wears Prada, A Day to Remember, Protest the Hero and Four Letter Lie; Protest the Hero later dropped off citing personal issues. A music video was released for "Still Dreaming" on February 27. "Still Dreaming" was released as a promo single on May 5. That same month, they performed at the Give it a Name festival in the UK and returned to Canada, where they appeared at the S.C.E.N.E. Music Festival.

== Reception ==
Professional ratings
Review scores
| Source | Rating |
|---|---|
| AbsolutePunk.net | (73%) |
| Allmusic | 3.5/5 stars |
| MammothPress.com | 4/10 stars |

While the album gained many positive reviews, many fans felt let down by the album, as it showed a change in style from post-hardcore to a more conventional rock-based sound. Alternative Press listed the album as one of the most anticipated albums of the year.

The album debuted at number 25 on the U.S. Billboard 200, selling about 27,000 copies in its first week.

Frontman Shane Told expressed his discontent with the album and his experience with producer Mark Trombino in a 2018 interview with Four Year Strong, remarking “it's just our worst record.”

== Track listing ==
| No. | Title | Writer(s) | Length |
|---|---|---|---|
| 1. | "Sound of the Sun" | Shane Told | 3:19 |
| 2. | "Bodies and Words" | Told | 3:13 |
| 3. | "If You Could See into My Soul" | Neil Boshart, Told | 3:59 |
| 4. | "Worlds Apart" | Told | 4:06 |
| 5. | "My Disaster" | Boshart, Told | 3:48 |
| 6. | "Still Dreaming" | Boshart, Told | 3:55 |
| 7. | "The Sand Will Turn to Glass" | Told | 2:52 |
| 8. | "Here Today, Gone Tomorrow" | Josh Bradford, Told | 3:33 |
| 9. | "Vanity and Greed" | Boshart, Told | 3:59 |
| 10. | "Love with Caution" | Bradford, Told | 3:27 |
| 11. | "True Romance" | Bradford, Told | 5:50 |
| Total length: | | | 42:01 |

Best Buy bonus tracks
| No. | Title | Writer(s) | Length |
|---|---|---|---|
| 12. | "Rain Will Fall" | Boshart, Told | 3:26 |
| 13. | "Falling Down" | Boshart, Bradford, Told | 3:14 |

== Personnel ==
Silverstein

- Shane Told – lead vocals
- Neil Boshart – lead guitar
- Josh Bradford – rhythm guitar
- Billy Hamilton – bass, backing vocals
- Paul Koehler – drums, percussion

Additional personnel & production

- Mark Trombino – producer, engineer, mixing, keyboard, percussion
- Dave Colvin – assistant engineer
- Sara Killion – assistant engineer
- Tyler Clinton – photography
- Martin Wittfooth – artwork

== Charts ==
=== Weekly charts ===
| Chart (2007) | Peak position |
|---|---|
| Canadian Albums (Nielsen SoundScan) | 25 |
| UK Independent Albums (Official Charts) | 16 |
| UK Rock & Metal Albums (Official Charts) | 25 |
| US Billboard 200 | 25 |
| US Independent Albums (Billboard) | 1 |
| US Top Alternative Albums (Billboard) | 19 |
| US Top Hard Rock Albums (Billboard) | 8 |
| US Top Rock Albums (Billboard) | 9 |

=== Year-end charts ===
| Chart (2007) | Position |
|---|---|
| US Independent Albums (Billboard) | 43 |
