= Short Songs =

Studio album by Silverstein
- Released: February 7, 2012
- Recorded: October 17–29, 2011
- Studio: Sundown Studios, Guelph, Ontario
- Genre: Hardcore punk; emo; screamo
- Length: 19:39
- Label: Hopeless
- Producer: Jordan Valeriote

Silverstein chronology
Rescue (2011)	Short Songs (2012)	This Is How the Wind Shifts (2013)

Short Songs is the sixth studio album by the Canadian post-hardcore band Silverstein. The release has an untraditional number of songs at 22, though as its title suggests, all songs are short and mostly under 90 seconds. The first half of the album consists of 11 original songs, while the second half consists of 11 covers of songs by notable punk, hardcore, and screamo bands that influenced Silverstein, such as Green Day, Orchid, Dead Kennedys, Gorilla Biscuits and NOFX. It is the band's second release on Hopeless Records and like their previous release, it was also produced by Jordan Valeriote. It is also the band's last release with long-time guitarist Neil Boshart, who left the band in the summer of 2012.

== Background and recording ==
Silverstein entered the studio in October 2011 with producer Jordan Valeriote, who produced their last studio album Rescue (2011) as well as their Transitions (2010) EP, to record a new release which was described by the band as a "mini-album" and "an extension of Rescue". The material came together very quickly and the band wanted to release it fast, scheduling January 2012 release, instead of making their fans wait for their next proper album. In a promotional video describing the project, Silverstein drummer Paul Koehler said, "Most people might associate a 'short song' with a fast punk rock vibe, but that's not always the case. There will still be a ballad, a breakdown, and some singalongs, all amidst these quick songs. The idea is to give the listeners a mini-Silverstein album, and take them through all of the peaks and valleys they could expect from any of our original albums." The cover of the Dead Kennedys' "Short Songs" was recorded with additional guest vocals from many singers of notable punk and hardcore bands, including Tim McIlrath of Rise Against, Chris #2 of Anti-Flag, Chris Hannah of Propagandhi and many more. Liam Cormier of Cancer Bats also recorded guest vocals on the song "xOn Our Kneesx."

== Release and promotion ==
On October 24, 2011, the band uploaded a video for the song "See Ya Bill" at their official YouTube channel. In December 2011, the band streamed for free three songs off the album: "SOS," "Brookfield," and "Sin & Redemption," as well as three cover songs: Gorilla Biscuits' "Good Intentions," Green Day's "The Ballad of Wilhelm Fink," and NOFX's "It's My Job to Keep Punk Rock Elite,"

A music video for "Brookfield" premiered on January 23, 2012. The video was directed by Josh Bradford. On February 5, 2012, two days prior to the release of the album Silverstein uploaded the entire album onto their MySpace profile.

Prior to the album's release while on tour with August Burns Red 200 Vinyl copies were made available. It came with a silk screened dust cover that was hand numbered.

== Reception ==
Professional ratings
Review scores
Source	Rating
Alternative Press	3.5/5 stars
Blare Magazine	4/5 stars
Rock Sound	(7/10)

The album debuted at number 133 on the Canadian Albums Chart.

== Track listing ==
Tracks 1–11 written by Silverstein. Lyrics by Shane Told, except "La Marseillaise" translated from "La Marseillaise" by Claude Joseph Rouget de Lisle and "See Ya Bill" by Josh Bradford.

Set 1
No.	Title	Length
1.	"Sick as Your Secrets"	1:08
2.	"Sin & Redemption"	1:09
3.	"SOS"	1:36
4.	"Brookfield"	1:30
5.	"La Marseillaise"	0:48
6.	"World on Fire"	1:24
7.	"Sleep Around"	1:19
8.	"My Miserable Life"	0:28
9.	"Truth & Temptation"	0:44
10.	"One Last Dance"	1:26
11.	"See Ya Bill"	0:06

Set 2
No.	Title	Length
12.	"Short Songs" (Dead Kennedys cover)	0:24
13.	"236 E. Broadway" (Gob cover)	1:20
14.	"Good Intentions" (Gorilla Biscuits cover)	0:26
15.	"Destination: Blood!" (Orchid cover)	1:08
16.	"Coffee Mug" (Descendents cover)	0:33
17.	"xOn Our Kneesx" (The Swarm cover)	0:24
18.	"Scenes from Parisian Life" (The Promise Ring cover)	1:21
19.	"It's My Job to Keep Punk Rock Elite" (NOFX cover)	1:24
20.	"Quit Your Job" (Chixdiggit cover)	0:23
21.	"The Ballad of Wilhelm Fink" (Green Day cover)	0:33
22.	"You Gotta Stay Positive" (Good Clean Fun cover)	0:05

== Personnel ==
Personnel per digital booklet.

Silverstein

- Shane Told – lead vocals
- Paul Koehler – drums
- Josh Bradford – rhythm guitar
- Billy Hamilton – bass guitar
- Neil Boshart – lead guitar

Guest musicians

- Chris #2 (Anti-Flag) – vocals on "Short Songs"
- Liam Cormier (Cancer Bats) – vocals on "xOn Our Kneesx"
- Nick Diener (The Swellers) – vocals on "Short Songs"
- Chris Hannah (Propagandhi) – vocals on "Short Songs"
- Mike Hranica (The Devil Wears Prada) – vocals on "Short Songs"
- Tim McIlrath (Rise Against) – vocals on "Short Songs"
- Paul Rousseau (Burst & Bloom) – vocals on "Short Songs"
- Jimmy Stadt (Polar Bear Club) – vocals on "Short Songs"
- Daniel Tremblay (I Am Committing a Sin) – vocals on "Short Songs"
- Scott Wade (ex-Comeback Kid) – vocals on "Short Songs"

Production

- Jordan Valeriote – producer, engineer, mixing
- Troy Glessener – mastering
- Mike Ski – artwork and layout

== Charts ==
Chart (2012)	Peak position
US Independent Albums (Billboard)	37
US Top Hard Rock Albums (Billboard)	15
