= When Broken Is Easily Fixed =

Studio album by Silverstein
- Released: May 20, 2003
- Recorded: January – February 2003; Mount Fairview and Unity Gain
- Genres: Emo; post-hardcore
- Length: 38:30
- Label: Victory
- Producer: Justin Koop

Silverstein chronology
When the Shadows Beam (2002)	When Broken Is Easily Fixed (2003)	Discovering the Waterfront (2005)

When Broken Is Easily Fixed is the debut studio album by the Canadian post-hardcore band Silverstein, released in 2003 under the label Victory Records.

In 2006, a fan named Ryan Heart auditioned for the American singing competition American Idol with the album's opening track "Smashed Into Pieces". Heart's rendition of the song employed inhale screams. Alternative Press stated that judges Simon Cowell, Paula Abdul and Randy "weren’t impressed."

== Music and lyrics ==
When Broken Is Easily Fixed is a post-hardcore album that has been described as combining elements of emo, hardcore punk and heavy metal. The album makes use of loud-quiet dynamics, cathartic melodies, harsh vocals, and breakdowns. Alternative Press considers it a "scene album", said the lyrics were "brutal and pleading".

== Background and recording ==
Forming in early 2000, Silverstein released two EPs, Summer's Stellar Gaze (2000) and When the Shadows Beam (2002). The second EP caught the attention of Victory Records, who announced that they had signed the band on October 22, 2002.

When Broken Is Easily Fixed was recorded at Mount Fairview and Unity Gain between January and February 2003 with producer Justin Koop. Koop engineered and mixed the album; Koop was assisted by engineer Rob Turri at Mount Fairview. Rainer Tan provided violin, while Shane Told and Richard McWalter supplied additional guitar. Kyle Bishop gave additional vocals to the title track. The album was mastered by Alan Douches at West West Side.

== Release ==
On April 3, 2003, When Broken Is Easily Fixed was announced for release in the following month. Alongside this, "Smashed Into Pieces" was posted online, followed by "Giving Up" on April 5, 2003. In April and May 2003, the band toured across the Midwest and southern US states, with Choke and Self Made Man. When Broken Is Easily Fixed was released on May 20, 2003 on Victory Records. Martin Wittfooth created the artwork. (Note: An early version of the artwork, dated January 23, 2003, featured the robot in a different position.) In July and August, the band toured across the US, with Freya; it included an appearance Warped Tour and Redemption Fest. The band went on a short tour in October with the Fulllbast, which was then followed by a handful of shows with Rise Against. Silverstein then went on a west coast and midwest US tour in November, with Bayside; Haste, Eleventeen, and Preacher Gone to Texas appeared on select dates. In January 2004, the band supported Spitalfield on their headlining US tour. In February 2004, the band went tour with the A.K.A.s. Following this, the band toured with Strike Anywhere and Fifth Hour Hero on their tour of the US, which ran into March 2004. In May and June 2004, the band went on tour with Alexisonfire, Emery, the Higher, and Hawthorne Heights. The album was reissued on September 14, 2004 with a DVD and two bonus tracks, "Friends in Fall River" and "Forever and a Day". In November 2004, the band supported Hot Water Music on their headlining North American tour.

"Smashed into Pieces" was re-recorded by the band in 2013 and released on May 20 to commemorate the ten-year anniversary of the album.

== Reception ==
Professional ratings
Review scores
Source	Rating
AllMusic	3/5 stars
Exclaim!	No rating
Metal Hammer	6/7

As of June 2007, the album has sold 179,000 copies. Alternative Press said it was "one of the most deeply personal and creative albums" of 2003.

== Track listing ==
No.	Title	Lyrics	Music	Length
1.	"Smashed into Pieces"	Shane Told	Told	3:42
2.	"Red Light Pledge"	Told	Told	3:48
3.	"Giving Up"	Told	Told	4:12
4.	"November"	Josh Bradford, Told	Neil Boshart	4:15
5.	"Last Days of Summer"	Told	Boshart	4:28
6.	"Bleeds No More"	Told	Told	3:16
7.	"Hear Me Out"		Bradford, Boshart, Told	3:48
8.	"The Weak and the Wounded"	Told	Boshart	3:15
9.	"Wish I Could Forget You"	Paul Koehler, Told	Richard McWalter, Bradford	3:26
10.	"When Broken Is Easily Fixed"	Told, Bradford	Bradford, Boshart	4:20
Total length:				38:30

Reissue bonus tracks
No.	Title	Length
11.	"Friends in Fall River"	3:18
12.	"Forever and a Day"	4:28

Reissue Bonus DVD
No.	Title	Length
1.	"Giving Up" (Live/Unreleased)	4:20
2.	"Giving Up" (Video)	4:20
3.	"Smashed into Pieces" (Live)	3:34
4.	"Smashed into Pieces" (Video)	3:43
5.	"Band Interview"	10:19
6.	"Interview with Shane"	3:07
7.	"Equipment Run Through"	4:54

== Personnel ==
Personnel per booklet.

Silverstein

- Shane Told – vocals, additional guitar
- Paul Koehler – drums
- Neil Boshart – lead guitar
- Josh Bradford – rhythm guitar
- Billy Hamilton – bass guitar

Additional personnel and production

- Justin Koop – producer, engineer, mixing
- Rob Turri – assistant engineer
- Alan Douches – mastering
- Rainer Tan – violin
- Richard McWalter – additional guitar
- Kyle Bishop – additional vocals on "When Broken Is Easily Fixed"
- Martin Wittfooth – artwork
- Eric Deleporte – design

== Charts ==
Chart (2005)	Peak position
US Heatseekers Albums (Billboard)	48
US Independent Albums (Billboard)	45
