= 18 Candles: The Early Years =

Compilation album by Silverstein
- Released: May 30, 2006
- Recorded: April 2000 – March 21, 2006
- Genres: Emo; post-hardcore
- Length: 70:29
- Label: Victory
- Producers: Scott Komer; Justin Koop; Cameron Webb; Shane Told

Silverstein chronology
Discovering the Waterfront (2005)	18 Candles: The Early Years (2006)	Arrivals & Departures (2007)

18 Candles: The Early Years is the first compilation album by the Canadian post-hardcore band Silverstein, released in 2006. It compiles their first two previously released, then-out-of-print EPs Summer's Stellar Gaze and When the Shadows Beam, along with some newly recorded acoustic and live material and a remix of the song "Smile in Your Sleep". By July 2006, the album had sold over 20,000 copies.

== Track listing ==
Summer's Stellar Gaze (2000)
No.	Title	Length
1.	"Waiting Four Years"	4:02
2.	"Wish I Could Forget You"	3:36
3.	"Friends In Fall River"	3:01
4.	"Summer's Stellar Gaze"	2:47
5.	"My Consolation"	4:02
6.	"Forever and a Day"	4:27

When the Shadows Beam (2002)
No.	Title	Length
7.	"Red Light Pledge"	3:51
8.	"Dawn of the Fall"	4:17
9.	"Wish I Could Forget You"	3:27
10.	"Bleeds No More"	3:17
11.	"Last Days of Summer"	4:26
12.	"Waiting Four Years"	4:14

Bonus tracks (2006)
No.	Title	Length
13.	"My Heroine" (acoustic version)	3:34
14.	"Call It Karma" (acoustic version)	4:18
15.	"Discovering the Waterfront" (live)	4:45
16.	"Defend You" (live)	3:34
17.	"Bleeds No More" (featuring Wil Francis of Aiden) (live)	4:16
18.	"Smile in Your Sleep" (A Crude Mechanical remix)	4:35
Total length:		70:29

== Personnel ==
Silverstein

- Shane Told – Lead vocals; bass guitar (Summer's Stellar Gaze)
- Josh Bradford – Rhythm guitar
- Neil Boshart – Lead guitar (When the Shadows Beam and bonus tracks)
- Billy Hamilton – Bass guitar, backing vocals (When the Shadows Beam and bonus tracks)
- Paul Adam Koehler – Drums, percussion, guitar
- Richard McWalter - Lead guitar (Summer's Stellar Gaze)

Production

- Engineered by Scott Komer, Justin Koop and Cameron Webb
- Produced by Shane Told, Alan Szymkowiak, Justin Koop and Cameron Webb
- Mixed by Alan Szymkowiak, Scott Komer and Cameron Webb
- Josh Bradford, Andy Owens and Kevin Kennaley - photographers

== Charts ==
Chart performance
Chart (2006)	Peak position
Canadian Albums (Nielsen SoundScan)	127
US Billboard 200	148
US Independent Albums (Billboard)	10
