= Discovering the Waterfront =

Studio album by Silverstein
- Released: August 16, 2005
- Recorded: March–April 2005
- Studios: Capitol (Hollywood); Maple Sound (Santa Ana, California)
- Genres: Post-hardcore; pop-punk; math rock; hardcore punk; emo; punk rock; screamo; power pop
- Length: 39:08
- Label: Victory
- Producer: Cameron Webb

Silverstein chronology
When Broken Is Easily Fixed (2003)	Discovering the Waterfront (2005)	18 Candles: The Early Years (2006)

Singles from Discovering the Waterfront
- 1. "Smile in Your Sleep" Released: July 19, 2005

Discovering the Waterfront is the second studio album by the Canadian post-hardcore band Silverstein. The album was promoted with three music videos for the tracks "Smile in Your Sleep", "Discovering the Waterfront", and "My Heroine".

The songs "Smile in Your Sleep" and "My Heroine" are considered to be classic anthems from the "2000s screamo movement" by publications such as Loudwire.

The album was reissued on vinyl in 2023.

== Background and recording ==
Discovering the Waterfront was recorded at Capitol Studios in Hollywood, California, and Maple Sound Studios in Santa Ana, California, during March and April 2005 with producer Cameron Webb. (Note: Webb would later work with the band producing A Shipwreck in the Sand (2009), and mixing Decade (Live at the El Mocambo) (2010), Transitions (2010) and Rescue (2011).) Webb also engineered and mixed the album.

The album was originally to contain only ten tracks rather than eleven. "My Heroine" was almost dropped from the album because Webb and the other band members were initially skeptical of it. Singer Shane Told attributed their initial underwhelm with the song due to the poor recording quality on the demo that he had made. He claims that he threw a fit and "started breaking stuff" in the studio. He wanted "Always and Never" cut from the album because he didn't know what to do vocally on the song. Both songs were eventually kept, and eleven songs were on the album. Told stated that Victory Records paid for the damage he caused in the studio during his tantrum.

== Release and promotion ==
On April 13, 2005, Discovering the Waterfront was announced for release in four months' time. In April and May 2005, the group performed across the US as part of the Fueled By Ramen & Friends Tour, and appeared at The Bamboozle festival. Following this, they toured Europe with the Black Maria and Aiden, and Australia with Behind Crimson Eyes until the end of May 2005. The album's track listing was posted online on May 25, 2005. They toured across Canada with Spitalfield, Sleepersetsail and the Turn It Ups, which included an appearance at Exo Fest, and then toured the US on the Warped Tour between mid-June and mid-August. "Smile in Your Sleep" was released as a radio single on July 19. Discovering the Waterfront was released on August 16 through Victory Records; it was promoted with a two-week US tour with I Am the Avalanche, Scary Kids Scaring Kids and Evergreen Terrace. Following this, they appeared at a Victory Records showcase at the CMJ Music Marathon, and played a handful of East Coast US shows with Underoath, Sincebyman, and Sullivan. In October 2005, the band toured the UK with labelmates Hawthorne Heights, Bayside and Spitalfield; it led into a two-month tour of the US with those same acts, plus Aiden, dubbed the Never Sleep Again Tour.

In February 2006, the band went on a short headlining tour in the US, with support from Spitalfield, the Audition, and Stretch Arm Strong. On February 28, 2006, a music video was released for "Discovering the Waterfront". The band went on the Take Action Tour in March, and the Taste of Chaos tour in April, leading up to appearances at The Bamboozle and Groezrock festivals. The band went on the 2006 edition of the Warped Tour. In August, the band made an appearance at Dirt Fest. The album was reissued on September 19 with a DVD and the bonus track "Rodeo Clown". In September, the band supported Underoath on their tour of Canada. In October and November, the band went on a headlining tour of the US, dubbed the Never Shave Again Tour, with support from Aiden, It Dies Today, He Is Legend, Man Alive, the Blackout Pact and I Killed the Prom Queen.

In honor of its tenth anniversary, Silverstein embarked on a Discovering the Waterfront tour beginning on 15 January 2015. It is a worldwide tour, consisting of US/Canada, Europe, UK and Australia. Support acts included Beartooth, Hands Like Houses, Major League and Iron Lung.

== Music and lyrics ==
Discovering the Waterfront is a post-hardcore album that utilizes elements of hardcore punk, power pop, math rock, pop punk and screamo. Some also associate the album with scene music.

The album's sound is said to be more mature than its predecessor. Rick Anderson of Allmusic noted the reduction in screamed passages in comparison to the album's predecessor, saying "they keep the screaming to a tasteful minimum, using it as a spice rather than a main ingredient. By so doing, they ensure that the screaming actually carries emotional meaning instead of turning into aural wallpaper". The album also features odd-meter guitar riffs, dual guitar lines, and vocal harmonies.

Lyrical themes explored on the album include heartbreak and lies. Some of the album's lyrics reference dismemberment, bone fractures, tooth ablation, and the soul. In the track "Smile in Your Sleep", singer Shane Told screams: "You were gravely mistaken!" The song was written by Told after he had suffered jet lag in the UK and he slept for twelve to fourteen hours and had a dream that he had murdered his girlfriend at the time. Told wrote the album's closing track "Call it Karma" inside of his walk-in closet in the apartment that is mentioned in the song's lyrics.

== Reception ==
Professional ratings
Review scores
Source	Rating
AllMusic	4/5 stars
Drowned in Sound	2/10
PopMatters	6/10 stars
Punknews.org	2.5/5 stars
Yahoo! Music	Favorable

=== Critical reception ===
Discovering the Waterfront received mixed to positive reviews from critics. Rick Anderson of Allmusic gave the album 4 stars out of 5 and commented on how the album sounded "remarkably mature [...] for a band that has only been together for a few years". Conversely, Drowned in Sound reviewer Brian E. Jemimah gave the album a scathing review, dismissing it as an attempt to appease existing fans of the group. He wrote: "There is some unremarkable, bog-standard drumming - always the necessary spine of a shit band – and some over-nurtured songs that have so many catchy soaring choruses (peppered with screamo 'moments') for The Kids to sing along to that it can be nothing but dull. Add some disgustingly tacked-on strings half the way through and you have more [sic] than enough reasons to press eject."

PopMatters gave the album a score of 6 of 10, and said that "for those above a certain age, this album will be a guilty pleasure. But for others, it will be the soundtrack to first loves, live journal entries, and long nights on myspace.com."

=== Commercial performance ===
Discovering the Waterfront charted at number 34 on the Billboard 200 chart and number 3 on the Independent Albums chart. It also landed at number 42 on the Billboard Independent Albums Year-end chart. By the end of 2005, the album had sold over 100,000 copies in the US. By August 2006, the album had sold over 188,000 copies. As of June 2007, the album has sold 232,000 copies. On the album's 10th anniversary the band posted a photo that mentioned the album had sold 400,000 copies. The album was certified Gold by Music Canada on September 5, 2024.

== Track listing ==
All songs written by Neil Boshart and Shane Told, except where noted. All songs performed by Silverstein.

No.	Title	Writer(s)	Length
1.	"Your Sword Versus My Dagger"	Told	3:00
2.	"Smile in Your Sleep"		3:13
3.	"The Ides of March"		3:29
4.	"Fist Wrapped in Blood"	Told	2:58
5.	"Discovering the Waterfront"	Boshart, Sean Mackin, Told	4:45
6.	"Defend You"		3:28
7.	"My Heroine"	Told	3:27
8.	"Always and Never"		3:51
9.	"Already Dead"		3:17
10.	"Three Hours Back"		3:36
11.	"Call It Karma"	Told	4:14
Total length:			39:08

Reissue bonus track
No.	Title	Length
12.	"Rodeo Clown" (Lifetime cover)	2:03

Reissue bonus DVD
No.	Title	Length
1.	"Your Sword Versus My Dagger" (live at the House of Blues in Chicago, IL from the Never Sleep Again Tour)
2.	"Smashed into Pieces" (live at the House of Blues in Chicago, IL from the Never Sleep Again Tour)
3.	"Fist Wrapped in Blood" (live at the House of Blues in Chicago, IL from the Never Sleep Again Tour)
4.	"Giving Up" (live at the House of Blues in Chicago, IL from the Never Sleep Again Tour)
5.	"Discovering the Waterfront" (live at the House of Blues in Chicago, IL from the Never Sleep Again Tour)
6.	"Defend You" (live at the House of Blues in Chicago, IL from the Never Sleep Again Tour)
7.	"Smile in Your Sleep" (live at the House of Blues in Chicago, IL from the Never Sleep Again Tour)
8.	"Bleeds No More" (featuring William Francis of Aiden) (live at the House of Blues in Chicago, IL from the Never Sleep Again Tour)
9.	"Smile in Your Sleep" (music video)
10.	"The Making of Smile in Your Sleep"
11.	"Discovering the Waterfront" (music video)
12.	"Discovering the Waterfront" (montage video)

iTunes bonus tracks
No.	Title	Length
12.	"Rodeo Clown" (Lifetime cover)	2:03
13.	"Discovering the Waterfront" (live at the House of Blues in Chicago, IL from the Never Sleep Again Tour) (video)	4:43

== Personnel ==
Personnel per booklet.

Silverstein

- Shane Told – vocals
- Paul Koehler – drums
- Neil Boshart – guitar
- Josh Bradford – guitar
- Billy Hamilton – bass guitar

Additional musicians

- Sean Mackin – string arrangement, violin
- Rodney Wirtz – violin, viola, cello
- Curtis Mathewson – mellotron, synths on "My Heroine"
- Shane Told – guitars on "Fist Wrapped in Blood", "My Heroine" and "Call It Karma"
- Billy Hamilton – additional vocals on "Smile in Your Sleep", "Discovering the Waterfront", "Defend You" and "Three Hours Back"
- Silverstein, Gohan and Chris, Julia, Cameron Webb, Nick Over It and his buddy Ryan – group vocals

Production

- Cameron Webb – producer, engineer, mixing
- Sergio Chavez, Steve Genewick, David Fricks – additional engineering
- Scott Komer, Cory Gash – pre-production recording
- Brian Gardner – mastering
- Mike Fasano – drum tech
- Paul Koehler, Silverstein – art direction
- Martin Wittfooth – artwork
- Gordie Ball – photo
- Doublej – layout

== Charts ==
=== Weekly charts ===
Chart (2005)	Peak position
Australian Hitseekers Albums (ARIA)	13
Canadian Albums (Nielsen SoundScan)	23
UK Independent Albums (Official Charts)	26
US Billboard 200	34
US Independent Albums (Billboard)	3

=== Year-end charts ===
Chart (2006)	Position
US Independent Albums (Billboard)	42

== Certifications ==
Region	Certification	Certified units/sales
Canada (Music Canada)	Gold	50,000^{‡}
^{‡} Sales+streaming figures based on certification alone.
