= Alexisonfire discography =

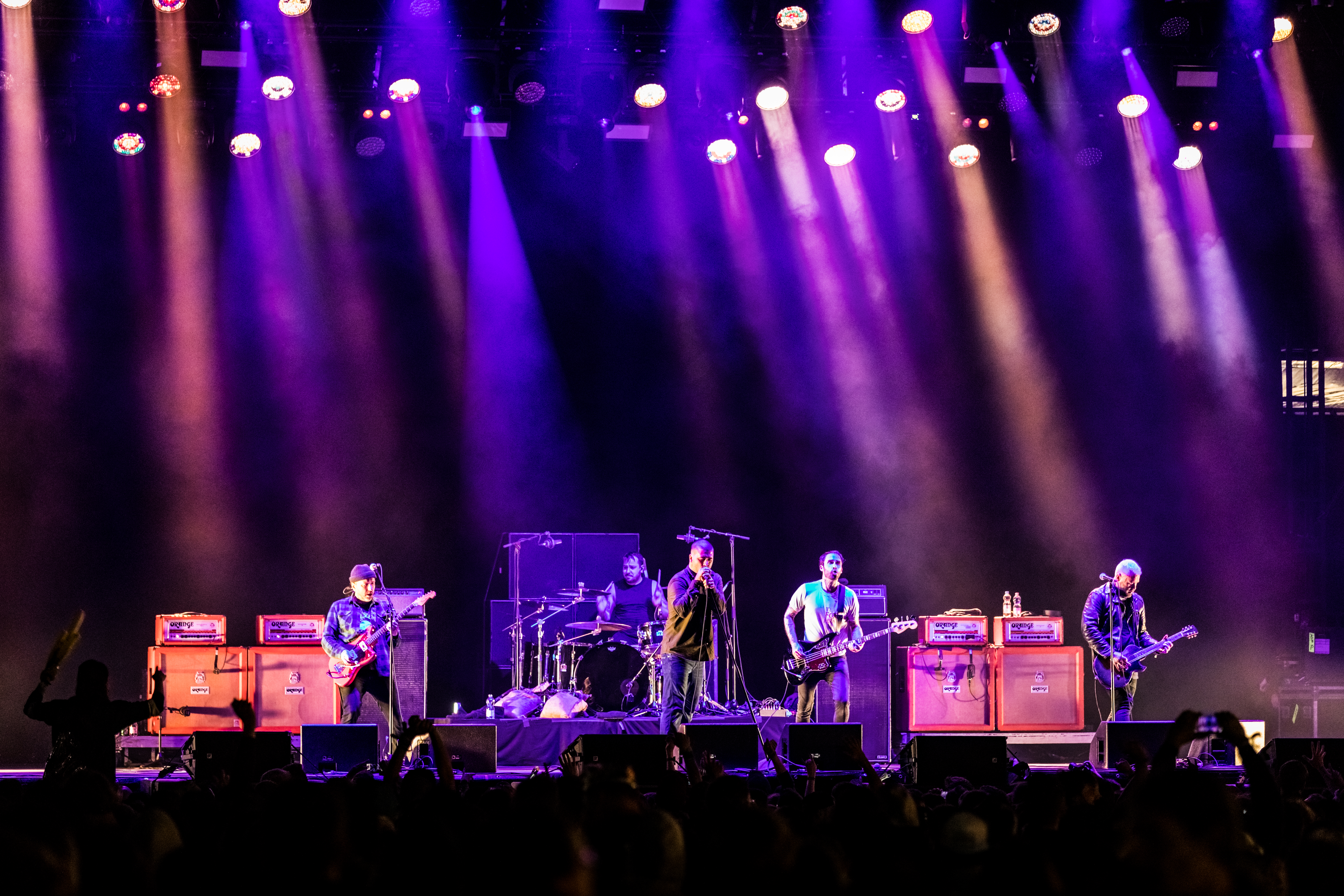
- Alexisonfire performing live
- Studio albums: 6
- Extended plays: 3
- Soundtrack albums: 1
- Live albums: 4
- Singles: 17
- Music videos: 18
- Split albums: 2
- Demos: 3

The discography of Alexisonfire, a Canadian post-hardcore band, consists of five studio albums, four live albums, eight extended plays and fourteen singles.

All songs were written by Alexisonfire unless noted. Jesse Ingelevics is featured in all songs prior to The Switcheroo Series: Alexisonfire vs. Moneen where Jordan "Ratbeard" Hastings is featured on and after the makings of The Switcheroo Series.

== Studio albums ==
Title	Album details	Peak chart positions						Certifications
Title	Album details	CAN	AUS	UK	US	US Indie	US Heat	Certifications
Alexisonfire	Released: October 31, 2002; Label: Distort Entertainment; Format: CD, LP, digital download	127	—	—	—	—	—	MC: Platinum
Watch Out!	Released: June 8, 2004; Label: Distort Entertainment; Format: CD, LP, digital download	6	—	—	—	21	25	MC: Platinum
Crisis	Released: August 22, 2006; Label: Distort Entertainment; Format: CD, LP, digital download	1	37	72	189	18	5	MC: Platinum; BPI: Silver
Old Crows / Young Cardinals	Released: June 23, 2009; Label: Dine Alone; Format: CD, LP, digital download	2	17	70	81	9	—	MC: Platinum
Otherness	Released: June 24, 2022; Label: Dine Alone; Format: CD, LP, digital download	4	42	67	—	—	—	
Bleed It	Released: March 19, 2027; Label: Dine Alone; Format: CD, LP, digital download	—	—	—	—	—	—	
"—" denotes a recording that did not chart or was not released in that territory.

=== Live albums ===
Year	Album details
2007	Live at Brixton Academy 11/13/07: Released: 2007; Label: Concert Live
2007	Live at Manchester Academy 11/14/07: Released: 2007; Label: Concert Live
2007	Live at Birmingham Academy 11/16/07: Released: 2007; Label: Concert Live
2016	Live at Copps: Released: February 12, 2016; Label: Alexisonfire Inc. / Dine Alone

=== Split albums ===
Year	Album details
2005	The Switcheroo Series: Alexisonfire vs. Moneen: Released: October 31, 2005; Label: Dine Alone Records; Split with: Moneen
2006	The Bled / Alexisonfire: Released: September 4, 2006; Label: Sore Point Records; Split with: The Bled

=== Demos ===
Year	Album details
2002	Math Sheets Demo: Released: 2002; Re-released: 2012; Label: Self-released
2002	Pink Heart Skull Sampler: Released: July 7, 2002; Label: Self-released
2004	Brown Heart Skull Sampler: Released: April 7, 2004; Label: Self-released

== Extended plays ==
Year	Extended play details
2010	iTunes Originals: Released: September 28, 2010; Label: Dine Alone Records
2010	Dog's Blood: Released: November 2, 2010; Label: Dine Alone Records
2012	Death Letter: Released: December 4, 2012; Label: Dine Alone Records

== Songs ==
=== Singles ===
Single	Year	Chart peak				Certifications	Album
Single	Year	CAN	CAN Alt	CAN Rock	UK	Certifications	Album
"No Transitory / Accidents"	2005	—	×	×	182		Watch Out!
"This Could Be Anywhere in the World"	2006	—	12	35	—	MC: Gold	Crisis
"Boiled Frogs"	2006	—	×	38	—		Crisis
"Drunks, Lovers, Sinners & Saints"	2007	—	×	—	—		Crisis
"Young Cardinals"	2009	48	14	29	—	MC: Gold	Old Crows / Young Cardinals
"No Rest"	2009	95	×	—	—		Old Crows / Young Cardinals
"Born and Raised"	2009	—	28	43	—		Old Crows / Young Cardinals
"The Northern"	2010	—	11	25	—		Old Crows / Young Cardinals
"Midnight Regulations"	2010	—	24	40	—		Old Crows / Young Cardinals
"The Dead Heart"	2010	84	2	15	—		Aussie Tour 7inch
"Familiar Drugs"	2019	—	—	50	—		Non-album single
"Complicit"	2019	—	—	—	—		Non-album single
"Season of the Flood"	2020	—	—	—	—		Non-album single
"Sweet Dreams of Otherness"	2022	—	28	32	—		Otherness
"Reverse the Curse"	2022	—	—	—	—		Otherness
"Sans Soleil"	2022	—	7	2	—		Otherness
"Push the River"	2026	—	—	—	—		Bleed It
"—" denotes a release that did not chart. "×" denotes periods where charts did not exist or were not archived.

=== Non-album tracks ===
Year	Track	Appears on
2006	"Sweet Leaf" (Black Sabbath cover)	Trailer Park Boys: The Movie Soundtrack

== Music videos ==
Year	Song	Director(s)	Album
2002	"Pulmonary Archery"	Marc Ricciardelli	Alexisonfire
2003	"Counterparts and Number Them"	Marc Ricciardelli	Alexisonfire
2004	"Waterwings (And Other Poolside Fashion Faux Pas)"	Marc Ricciardelli	Alexisonfire
2004	"Accidents"	Marc Ricciardelli	Watch Out!
2005	"No Transitory"	Marc Ricciardelli	Watch Out!
2005	"Hey, It's Your Funeral Mama"	Marc Ricciardelli	Watch Out!
2006	"Passing Out in America/Accidents Are on Purpose"	Marc Ricciardelli	Alexisonfire vs. Moneen
2007	"This Could Be Anywhere in the World"	Chris Sargent, Steve Mottershead	Crisis
2007	"Boiled Frogs"	Chris Sargent	Crisis
2007	"Rough Hands"	Marc Ricciardelli	Crisis
2009	"Young Cardinals"	Marc Ricciardelli	Old Crows / Young Cardinals
2009	"Born and Raised"	Marc Ricciardelli	Old Crows / Young Cardinals
2010	"The Northern"	Michael Maxxis	Old Crows / Young Cardinals
2019	"Familiar Drugs"	Michael Maxxis	—N/a
2020	"Season of the Flood"	—N/a	—N/a
2022	"Sweet Dreams of Otherness"	Jay Baruchel	Otherness
2022	"Sans Soleil"	Michael Maxxis	Otherness
2026	"Push the River"	Vanessa Heins	Bleed It
