= This Could Be Anywhere in the World =

2006 single by Alexisonfire

Single by Alexisonfire

from the album Crisis
- B-side: "Charlie Sheen vs. Henry Rollins"
- Released: November 20, 2006
- Genre: Post-hardcore; emo
- Length: 4:00
- Label: Distort; Vagrant
- Songwriters: Dallas Green; Jordan Hastings; Wade MacNeil; George Pettit; Chris Steele
- Producers: Julius Butty; Alexisonfire

Alexisonfire singles chronology
"Hey, It's Your Funeral Mama" (2005)	"This Could Be Anywhere in the World" (2006)	"Boiled Frogs" (2006)

"This Could Be Anywhere in the World" is a song recorded by Alexisonfire for their third album Crisis (2006). It was released as the album's second single on November 20, 2006, and became the band's first song to place on the Canadian alternative and rock charts.

The song was certified Gold in Canada in 2018 and Platinum in 2021.

== Background ==
The song was released as the second single from Crisis, after "Boiled Frogs" in July. A music video for the song was released on August 9, 2006. It topped MuchMusic's Countdown for the week of October 13, 2006. The song was nominated at the 2007 MuchMusic Video Awards for MuchLOUD Best Rock Video, People's Choice: Favourite Canadian Group and won the award for Best Cinematography. Alexisonfire performed the song at the award show.

The song was featured on the video game MLB 07: The Show.

== Charts ==
Chart (2006–07)	Peak position
Canada Alternative	12
Canada Rock	35
