= Death Letter (EP) =

EP by Alexisonfire
- Released: December 4, 2012
- Recorded: November 2012 at Jukasa Studios in Ohsweken, Ontario, Canada
- Genres: Acoustic; noise rock
- Length: 25:58
- Label: Dine Alone
- Producer: Alexisonfire

Alexisonfire chronology
Dog's Blood (2010)	Death Letter (2012)	Otherness (2022)

Death Letter is an extended play by the Canadian post-hardcore band Alexisonfire. The EP was released on December 4, 2012. Death Letter contains songs from their entire discography reworked for acoustic guitar. Of the six songs on the EP, 4 are from their last full-length album, Old Crows/Young Cardinals. It was the band's last release before their break up, and serves as an accompaniment to their farewell tour that took place in December 2012.

== Writing and recording ==
Death Letter was presumably recorded sometime prior to the band's farewell tour, which spanned several cities in 15 shows. The EP features reworked songs from Alexisonfire's previous albums, specifically Old Crows/Young Cardinals, Crisis and Watch Out!. A press release from Dine Alone Records said that the EP contained six old Alexisonfire tunes reworked by guitarists Wade MacNeil and Dallas Green at Jukasa Studios in Ohsweken, Ontario, without involvement of the three other members of the band.

== Release ==
The EP was made available for streaming on December 10, 2012, on exclaim.ca, as well as on the Dine Alone Records SoundCloud page. It was released as a final piece of work before the band commenced their final tour.

On December 25, 2013, the band released a vinyl box set spanning the band's entire discography, as well as demos, b-sides and previously unreleased material. This included a vinyl entitled Death Letter – Bonus Tracks, which features two previously unreleased acoustic renditions of the band's singles: "Boiled Frogs" and "The Northern", which were originally recorded for the Death Letter EP.

== Track listing ==
All tracks are written by Alexisonfire.

No.	Title	Original release	Length
1.	"Born and Raised"	Old Crows / Young Cardinals (2009)	4:53
2.	"Midnight Regulations"	Old Crows / Young Cardinals (2009)	5:38
3.	"You Burn First"	Crisis (2006)	3:03
4.	"Accept Crime"	Old Crows / Young Cardinals (2009)	3:49
5.	"Burial"	Old Crows / Young Cardinals (2009)	3:35
6.	"Happiness by the Kilowatt"	Watch Out! (2004)	5:03
Total length:			25:58

Vinyl box set bonus tracks
No.	Title	Original release	Length
1.	"Boiled Frogs"	Crisis (2006)	5:30
2.	"The Northern"	Old Crows / Young Cardinals (2009)	4:09
Total length:			9:39

== Personnel ==
Alexisonfire

- Dallas Green – vocals, guitar
- Wade MacNeil – vocals, guitar

== Release history ==
December 4, 2012	Canada	Dine Alone Records
December 4, 2012	United States	
