= Otherness (Alexisonfire album) =

2022 studio album by Alexisonfire

Studio album by Alexisonfire
- Released: June 24, 2022
- Studios: Jukasa Recording Studios, Ohsweken, Ontario, Canada
- Genre: Post-hardcore
- Length: 50:05
- Label: Dine Alone
- Producer: Alexisonfire

Alexisonfire chronology
Death Letter (2012)	Otherness (2022)	Bleed It (2027)

Singles from Otherness
- 1. "Sweet Dreams of Otherness" Released: March 14, 2022; 2. "Reverse the Curse" Released: April 20, 2022; 3. "Sans Soleil" Released: May 17, 2022

Professional ratings
Aggregate scores
Source	Rating
Metacritic	92/100
Review scores
Source	Rating
Distorted Sound	9/10
Kerrang!	5/5 stars
Line of Best Fit	7/10
Louder	4/5 stars
Sputnikmusic	4.4/5 stars

Otherness is the fifth studio album by Canadian post-hardcore band Alexisonfire. The album was released on June 24, 2022, thirteen years after the release of their last full-length album, Old Crows / Young Cardinals. It is also their first album since reuniting in 2015. The album takes its name from the first single from the album released, "Sweet Dreams of Otherness", which premiered on YouTube on March 10, 2022. It peaked at No. 4 on the Canadian albums chart.

The album won the Juno Award for Rock Album of the Year at the Juno Awards of 2023.

== Background ==
Alexisonfire reunited in 2015 but did not release any new material until February 15, 2019, when they released "Familiar Drugs", their first song in over eight years. On May 24, 2019, the band released another standalone single called "Complicit", followed by "Season of the Flood", on January 13, 2020.

There appeared to be little intention from the band to release another full-length album until January 18, 2022, when it was reported that the band's Genius page had been updated, showing metadata about an unreleased Alexisonfire album, complete with artwork and tracklist.

== Track listing ==
All music is composed by Alexisonfire

Otherness track listing
No.	Title	Length
1.	"Committed to the Con"	4:01
2.	"Sweet Dreams of Otherness"	4:44
3.	"Sans Soleil"	5:04
4.	"Conditional Love"	2:53
5.	"Blue Spade"	5:31
6.	"Dark Night of the Soul"	6:02
7.	"Mistaken Information"	4:48
8.	"Survivor's Guilt"	4:52
9.	"Reverse the Curse"	3:54
10.	"World Stops Turning"	8:16
Total length:		50:05

== Personnel ==
Credits retrieved from album's liner notes.

Alexisonfire

- George Pettit – vocals
- Dallas Green – vocals, guitar
- Wade MacNeil – guitar, vocals
- Chris Steele – bass, backing vocals
- Jordan Hastings – drums, percussion, backing vocals

Additional Musicians

- Matt Kelly - vocal arrangement assistance, pedal steel, slide guitar, synthesisers, keyboards
- Jill Zimmermann - backing vocals (track 8)

Technical

- Alexisonfire - production
- Darren Magierowski - engineering
- Jill Zimmermann - engineering
- Jonah Falco - mixing
- Dave Cooley - mastering
- Jordan Gauthier - drum technician
- Luke Schindler - pre-production engineering

Artwork

- Nedda Afsari - photography, creative direction
- Nick Steinhardt - art direction, design
- Ryan Sanders - art direction, design
- Sara Cummings - model
- Anthony Maldonado - model
- Blake Armstrong - makeup
- Ricky Fraser - hair
- Ross Farrar - production assistant

== Charts ==
Chart performance for Otherness
Chart (2022)	Peak position
Australian Albums (ARIA)	42
Canadian Albums (Billboard)	4
German Albums (Offizielle Top 100)	40
Scottish Albums (Official Charts)	12
UK Albums (Official Charts)	67
UK Independent Albums (Official Charts)	3
UK Rock & Metal Albums (Official Charts)	3
