= Young Cardinals =

Single by Alexisonfire

from the album Old Crows / Young Cardinals
- Released: May 12, 2009
- Recorded: February – March 2009
- Genre: Post-hardcore
- Length: 3:36
- Label: Dine Alone; Vagrant
- Songwriters: Dallas Green; Jordan Hastings; Wade MacNeil; George Pettit; Chris Steele
- Producers: Julius Butty; Alexisonfire

Alexisonfire singles chronology
"Rough Hands" (2007)	"Young Cardinals" (2009)	"Born and Raised" (2009)

"Young Cardinals" is the first single from Alexisonfire's fourth studio album, Old Crows / Young Cardinals.

The song was first played on the radio on April 20, 2009 and premiered on imeem on April 22. As of April 24, "Young Cardinals" has been streaming on Alexisonfire's MySpace page. The song was officially released on May 12, 2009. A music video was shot for "Young Cardinals" on May 2, 2009, on board the Maid of the Mist in Niagara Falls, Canada and premiered on MOD on May 15.

The song is also available for download on the music video game Guitar Hero World Tour and is featured in EA Sports NHL 10.

== Personnel ==
- George Pettit – lead vocals
- Dallas Green – rhythm guitar, vocals
- Wade MacNeil – lead guitar, backing vocals
- Chris Steele – bass guitar
- Jordan Hastings – drums, percussion

== Charts ==
Chart (2009)	Peak position
Canada (Canadian Hot 100)	49
Canada Rock (Billboard)	29

== Certifications ==
Region	Certification	Certified units/sales
Canada (Music Canada)	Gold	40,000^{‡}
^{‡} Sales+streaming figures based on certification alone.
