= Alexisonfire (album) =

Studio album by Alexisonfire
- Released: October 31, 2002
- Recorded: 2002
- Genres: Screamo; emo; post-hardcore
- Length: 42:16
- Labels: Distort; Equal Vision; Defiance Records
- Producers: Alexisonfire; Greg Below

Alexisonfire chronology
Alexisonfire (2002)	Watch Out! (2004)

Singles from Alexisonfire
- 1. ".44 Caliber Love Letter" Released: September 16, 2002; 2. "Pulmonary Archery" Released: July 18, 2003

Alexisonfire is the debut studio album from Canadian post-hardcore band Alexisonfire, released on October 31, 2002.

== Background ==
The first version of the album comes from the math sheets demo, which included early versions of the songs "Counterparts and Number Them" and "Little Girls Pointing and Laughing" It was recorded at Burning Sound recording studio in Niagara Falls. The album itself was recorded at many different studios across Toronto, with the band eager to finish recording and perform shows.

== Release ==
Alexisonfire was released on October 31, 2002. The cover art was photographed by lead singer George Pettit at Ferndale Public School in St. Catharines, Ontario. It is based on the lyrics from "A Dagger Through the Heart of St. Angeles". There was also an alternative cover art released, which just depicts the band's logo and name. In June 2003, the band embarked on short tour of Canada with From Autumn to Ashes, A Static Lullaby, and Boys Night Out. The following month, the band performed at Hellfest. In September and October, the band went on a tour of Canada with Billy Talent, Spitalfield and Death from Above. Following this, the band played with Spitalfield on their tour of the US. In December 2003, the band went on an eastern Canadian tour, with Jersey and At the Mercy of Inspiration.

On January 14, 2014, a remixed and remastered version of the album by Dine Alone Records was released.

In 2017, Dine Alone Records released a playlist curated by the band of the twenty songs that influences the album. It included Pg.99's "In Love with an Apparition", Joshua Fit for Battle's "To Bring our Own End", Saetia's "Venus and Bacchus", Majority Rule's "The Sin in Grey", Love Lost But Not Forgotten's "Loathing", the Appleseed Cast's "On Reflection", Owl's "Everyone is my Friend", Chore's "Superville", Don Caballero's "For Respect", Shiner's "Glass Jaw Test", Faraquet's "Cut Self Not", Sunny Day Real Estate's "The Ocean", Saves the Day's "At Your Funeral", the Get-Up Kids' "Ten Minutes", Mogwai's "Take Me Somewhere Nice", Moneen's "Wrath of the Donkey", At the Drive-in's "Arcarsenel" Snapcase's "Disconnector" and Bane's "Struck Down by Me".

== Reception ==
Professional ratings
Review scores
Source	Rating
Punknews.org	4.5/5 stars

In 2015, NME listed the album as one of "20 Emo Albums That Have Resolutely Stood The Test Of Time". In 2022, Andrew Sacher of BrooklynVegan wrote that the album defined typical emo characteristics such as "Two singers, one who screams and one who whine-sings... Chaotic song structures... Bright melodies even at the most aggressive moments... Verbose teenage poetry, sometimes delivered as tense spoken word... [and an] overwhelming amount of melodrama..." Sacher said that the album "helped establish [the foregoing traits] as dominant traits of the early 2000s emo/post-hardcore boom."

In December 2018, the album was given a platinum certification by Music Canada as it sold over 100,000 units in Canada.

== Track listing ==
All tracks are written by Alexisonfire.

No.	Title	Length
1.	".44 Caliber Love Letter"	4:31
2.	"Counterparts and Number Them"	2:18
3.	"Adelleda"	5:47
4.	"A Dagger Through the Heart of St. Angeles"	4:12
5.	"Polaroids of Polar Bears"	5:08
6.	"Water Wings (And Other Poolside Fashion Faux Pas)"	2:41
7.	"Where No One Knows"	3:12
8.	"The Kennedy Curse"	3:38
9.	"Jubella"	2:29
10.	"Little Girls Pointing and Laughing"	4:54
11.	"Pulmonary Archery"	3:26
Total length:		42:16

== Personnel ==
- George Pettit – unclean vocals, photography
- Dallas Green – rhythm guitar, clean vocals
- Wade MacNeil – lead guitar, vocals
- Chris Steele – bass guitar
- Jesse Ingelevics – drums
- Greg Below – producer, engineer, mixer
- D. Sandshaw – A&R for Equal Vision Records
- George Kotsopoulos – drum editor
- Bed Kaplan – drum editor
- Bill Scoville – album layout

== Charts ==
Chart performance for Alexisonfire
Chart (2003)	Peak position
Canadian Albums (Nielsen SoundScan)	127

Chart performance for Alexisonfire/Watch Out!
Chart (2007)	Peak position
UK Independent Albums (Official Charts)	28
UK Rock & Metal Albums (Official Charts)	27

== Certifications ==
Certifications and sales for Alexisonfire
Region	Certification	Certified units/sales
Canada (Music Canada)	Platinum	100,000^{‡}
^{‡} Sales+streaming figures based on certification alone.

== Release history ==
Release dates and formats for Alexisonfire
Region	Date	Label	Format	Catalog	Notes
Canada	October 31, 2002	Distort Entertainment	CD	DE-002	
United States	September 9, 2003	Equal Vision Records	CD	EVR89	Digipak
United Kingdom	July 5, 2004	Sorepoint Records	CD	SORE018CD	Alternate cover
Germany	ca.2004/2005	Defiance Records	LP		Limited edition

== Videos ==
- "Pulmonary Archery"
- "Counterparts and Number Them"
- "Waterwings (And Other Poolside Fashion Faux Pas)"
