= Send Flowers =

Studio album by Black Lungs
- Released: May 20, 2008
- Genre: Alternative rock; folk punk
- Length: 29:19
- Label: Dine Alone

Professional ratings
Review scores
Source	Rating
ThePunkSite.com	3.5/5 stars
Rockmidgets.com	4/5

Send Flowers is the debut album release from Black Lungs, the side project of Alexisonfire guitarist and backing vocalist Wade MacNeil. MacNeil's sound has been described as "the soundtrack for punk rockers, hip hoppers, pill poppers, young ladies and show stoppers."

The album was originally due out at the end of Alexisonfire's tour in December 2007, but was instead released in May 2008 with Dine Alone Records.

== Track listing ==
All songs written and composed by Wade MacNeil

1. "A Blessing and a Curse" – 1:08
2. "Fire and Brimstone" – 3:14
3. "When It's Blackout" – 3:38
4. "Hold Fast (Sink or Swim)" – 3:36
5. "These Moments Define Us" – 3:12
6. "For Her" – 3:37
7. "So It Goes" – 3:19
8. "Timeless" – 4:00
9. "In Memory" – 3:48

== Personnel ==
- Wade MacNeil – lead vocals, lead guitar, bass guitar
- George Pettit – rhythm guitar, backing vocals
- Sammi Bogdanski – piano, keyboard
- Ian Romano – drums, percussion
