= Old Crows / Young Cardinals =

Album by Alexisonfire

Studio album by Alexisonfire
- Released: June 23, 2009
- Recorded: February – March 2009
- Studios: Armoury, Vancouver, British Columbia; Metalworks, Mississauga, Ontario
- Genres: Post-hardcore; melodic hardcore
- Length: 42:06
- Labels: Dine Alone; Vagrant
- Producer: Julius Butty

Alexisonfire chronology
Crisis (2006)	Old Crows / Young Cardinals (2009)	Dog's Blood (2010)

Singles from Old Crows / Young Cardinals
- 1. "Young Cardinals" Released: May 25, 2009; 2. "Born and Raised" Released: October 18, 2009; 3. "The Northern" Released: January 10, 2010

Old Crows / Young Cardinals is the fourth studio album from Canadian post-hardcore band Alexisonfire, released on June 23, 2009. The album was originally referred to by the shortened title of Young Cardinals, until the name change was announced on April 1, 2009.

== Background ==
Following the release of Crisis, the members kept themselves busy with other projects: vocalist Dallas Green with his other band City and Colour; guitarist Wade McNeil with Black Lungs; and vocalist George Pettit performing with Fucked Up and Bergenfield Four. In October and November 2008, the band toured Europe as part of The Eastpak Antidote Tour. In December, it was revealed that the band would be recording their next album in 2009. McNeil said the record would be "fucking heavy."

== Recording ==
In an interview in January 2009, Wade MacNeil and band manager Joel Carriere confirmed that they have 10 songs ready for recording, one of which being "Emerald St." (given full title "Emerald Street" on the album). The band announced they would begin recording on February 1, 2009, documenting the process as it happened on their internet blog, with MacNeil stating that "For the first time ever we have too many songs". Recording took place in Armoury Studios in Vancouver, British Columbia, working with engineer Nick Blagona (who has previously worked with April Wine and Cat Stevens, as well as the band's 2006 album, Crisis). One week later, Dallas Green announced that the band had already completed seven songs, including "Midnight Regulations", and "probably 8 by the time we finish up".

By March 1, 2009, the band announced in their studio blog that they had "drums, bass and most of the guitars completed", and had "now moved on to leads and overdubs". Later the same week, MacNeil announced that work on the album in Vancouver had been completed, with the exception of Green's vocal parts. Upon returning from Vancouver, further recording took place at Silo Studios in Hamilton, Ontario, the same location used on the band's 2004 album Watch Out! and some parts of Crisis. Here, the band co-produced with Julius Butty, who had also worked on the band's previous two albums. Mastering of the album was completed on April 8, 2009, by Brett Zilahi at João Carvalho Mastering.

== Release ==
On April 8, 2009, Old Crows / Young Cardinals was announced for release later in the year. On April 22, 2009, "Young Cardinals" was made available for streaming. On May 18, 2009, a music video was released for "Young Cardinals"; it had been filmed in Niagara Falls, Ontario. On June 2, 2009, "No Rest" was posted online. During the same month, the band played a handful of European festivals, leading up to an appearance at the Edgefest in Canada. Old Crows / Young Cardinals was released on June 23. The album was released on Dine Alone Records, an independent label founded by the band's manager Joel Carriere. It was mark the first time the band have not released through Distort Entertainment in Canada. Dine Alone released the disc in Canada, Australia and South Africa, while the album will be released in the United States by Vagrant Records. Between late June and late August, the band performed on the Warped Tour. An EP was released, featuring "Two Sisters" and "Wayfarer Youth", on July 14, 2009 through Dine Alone Records. Shortly after this, they appeared at the Reading and Leeds Festivals in the UK. They co-headlined the Eastpak Antidote Tour, which trekked across Europe, with Anti-Flag; they were supported by the Ghost of a Thousand and the Fall of Troy.

On January 29, 2010, a music video was released for "The Northern". In February and March 2010, the band performed at Soundwave festival in Australia. On March 3, Dine Alone released Old Crows/Young Cardinals on coloured vinyl discs. After the initial run, a standard black pressing will replace it. The initial run contains the following French quote across all four sides of the album in the deadwax: Et ses mains ourdiraient/Les entrailles du prêtre/Au défaut d'un cordon/Pour étrangler les rois. It is a quote from philosopher Denis Diderot's poem Les Éleuthéromanes, translated to: And his hands would plait the priest's entrails, for want of a rope, to strangle kings. More succinctly, it has been taken to mean, "Man will never be free until the last king is strangled with the entrails of the last priest." Following this, the band went on a Canadian tour with Billy Talent, Against Me! and Gallows. In April and May 2010, the band went on a cross-country US tour with support from Trash Talk, Therefore I Am and La Dispute. In June 2010, Alexisonfire performed at Petite-Nation Rockfest.

== Reception ==
Professional ratings
Aggregate scores
Source	Rating
Metacritic	69/100
Review scores
Source	Rating
AbsolutePunk	(85%)
AllMusic	3.5/5 stars
Kerrang!	4/5 stars
Melodic	3.5/5 stars
Punknews.org	4.5/5 stars
Sputnikmusic	3.5/5 stars
Toro Magazine	4/5 stars
Ultimate Guitar	(9.3/10)

Old Crows / Young Cardinals was met with generally favourable reviews from music critics. At Metacritic, which assigns a normalized rating out of 100 to reviews from mainstream publications, the album received an average score of 69, based on five reviews.

The album debuted at #81 on the Billboard 200, making this Alexisonfire's highest-charting album in the US to date.

== Track listing ==
All lyrics are written by Alexisonfire; lyrics on track 6 based on the hymn "Roll, Jordan, Roll"; all music is composed by Alexisonfire.

No.	Title	Length
1.	"Old Crows"	4:17
2.	"Young Cardinals"	3:38
3.	"Sons of Privilege"	3:21
4.	"Born and Raised"	4:01
5.	"No Rest"	3:37
6.	"The Northern"	4:28
7.	"Midnight Regulations"	4:11
8.	"Emerald Street"	3:16
9.	"Heading for the Sun"	3:45
10.	"Accept Crime"	3:14
11.	"Burial"	4:18
Total length:		42:06

iTunes pre-order bonus track
No.	Title	Length
12.	"Young Cardinals" (demo)	3:51

Japanese Edition
No.	Title	Length
12.	"Two Sisters"	1:27
13.	"Wayfarer Youth"	3:41

Australian Edition
No.	Title	Length
12.	"Wayfarer Youth" (bonus track on the first pressing)	3:41

== Personnel ==
Alexisonfire

- George Pettit – unclean vocals, organ
- Dallas Green – clean vocals, rhythm guitar
- Wade MacNeil – lead guitar, backing vocals
- Chris Steele – bass guitar
- Jordan Hastings – drums, percussion

Production

- Produced by Julius Butty and Alexisonfire
- Engineered by Nick Blagona
- Assistant engineering by Rob Stefenson (Vancouver, BC) and Marco Brasette (Hamilton, ON)
- Mixed by Julius Butty at Metalworks Studios
- Mixing Assistant by Kevin Dietz
- Pre-production by Nicholas Osczypko
- Mastered by Brett Zilahi at Joao Carvalho Mastering

Art

- Art direction by Alexisonfire
- Paintings, collage and design by Paul Jackson
- Layout by Paul Jackson; assisted by Justin Ellsworth
- Typed by Tricia Ricciuto; assisted by Scott Rémila

== Charts ==
=== Weekly charts ===
Weekly chart performance
Chart (2009)	Peak position
Australian Albums (ARIA)	17
Canadian Albums (Billboard)	2
Scottish Albums (Official Charts)	87
UK Albums (Official Charts)	70
US Billboard 200	81
US Independent Albums (Billboard)	9
US Top Alternative Albums (Billboard)	17
US Top Hard Rock Albums (Billboard)	12
US Top Rock Albums (Billboard)	31

=== Year-end charts ===
Year-end chart performance
Chart (2009)	Position
Canadian Albums (Billboard)	48

== Certifications ==
Certifications
Region	Certification	Certified units/sales
Canada (Music Canada)	Platinum	80,000^{‡}
^{‡} Sales+streaming figures based on certification alone.
