= Dog's Blood =

EP by Alexisonfire
- Released: October 31, 2010
- Recorded: August 2010
- Genres: Post-hardcore; hardcore punk
- Length: 21:05
- Labels: Dine Alone, Roadrunner Records
- Producers: Alexisonfire, Jon Drew

Alexisonfire chronology
Old Crows / Young Cardinals (2009)	Dog's Blood (2010)	Death Letter (2012)

Professional ratings
Review scores
Source	Rating
AbsolutePunk	(90%)
Alter the Press!	3/5 stars
Big Cheese	(3/5)
Bring The Noise UK	10/10 stars
Chart Attack	(2/5)
Music Feeds	(favourable)

Dogs Blood is an extended play by the Canadian post-hardcore band Alexisonfire. The EP was released on October 31, 2010. Dogs Blood is a collection of four experimental songs that are different-sounding from the band's previously released material. The EP debuted at #63 on the Canadian Albums Chart. It was the band's penultimate release before their break up in 2011.

== Writing and recording ==
Work on the Dogs Blood EP was originally announced in September 2009, shortly after the release of Old Crows/Young Cardinals in July 2009. By this point, the band had developed a small group of songs; one was an instrumental piece written during the sessions of Old Crows/Young Cardinals, and the rest were written while Alexisonfire was on tour. The title track "Dogs Blood" began as a single riff, and later evolved into a full song. Alexisonfire vocalist George Pettit wrote lyrics that were loosely in the style of Nick Cave. The title track features guest vocals by Olly Mitchell, the former vocalist of Johnny Truant.

The album was recorded and co-produced by Alexisonfire and Jon Drew. Though much of the EP was written by September 2009, the band's busy touring schedule delayed recording of Dogs Blood until mid-late 2010. All of the tracks on Dogs Blood are songs that the band members felt were too different from their other material to be included on a full-length album.

== Release ==
Prior to the EP's release, Alexisonfire debuted the album's titled track live at the 2010 CASBY Awards in Toronto, Ontario, Canada on September 30, 2010, and a recording of the track was posted online. Dogs Blood was released through Dine Alone Records on November 23, 2010, though it was distributed internationally on various dates through different labels and also through online music retailers. A vinyl edition of the album was pressed and limited to 2,000 copies in three colors, one color available from the band on tours, one available through the band's webstore, and the third sold in record stores.

The artwork was designed by the American artist "Skinner", who was given only the EP's title and the band's name on which to base his design. The artwork was completed prior to the album's recording.

== Track listing ==
All tracks are written by Alexisonfire.

No.	Title	Length
1.	"Dogs Blood"	6:00
2.	"Grey"	5:19
3.	"Black as Jet"	3:52
4.	"Vex"	6:02
Total length:		21:05

== Personnel ==
Alexisonfire

- George Pettit – unclean vocals
- Dallas Green – clean vocals, rhythm guitar
- Wade MacNeil – lead guitar, backing vocals
- Chris Steele – bass guitar
- Jordan Hastings – drums, percussion

Additional Musician

- Oliver Mitchell - additional vocals on "Dogs Blood"

Production & Artwork

- Jon Drew – production, mixing, mastering
- Alexisonfire - production
- Alex Bonenfant - production assistance
- Skinner - cover art illustration

== Charts ==
Chart performance
Chart (2010)	Peak position
Canadian Albums (Nielsen SoundScan)	63
UK Albums (Official Charts)	150
UK Rock & Metal Albums (Official Charts)	12

== Release history ==
Release history
Release date	Region	Label
October 31, 2010	United Kingdom	Roadrunner Records
November 1, 2010	Europe	Roadrunner Records
November 1, 2010	Japan	Roadrunner Records
November 2, 2010	Canada	Dine Alone Records
November 2, 2010	United States	Vagrant Records
November 5, 2010	Australia	Dine Alone Records
