= No Tears for the Creatures =

Studio album by Johnny Truant
- Released: June 2, 2008
- Genre: Metalcore
- Label: United By Fate Records (UK); Distort Entertainment (Canada); Ferret Music (USA)
- Producer: Dan Weller and Justin Hill (Wellerhill Productions)

Johnny Truant chronology
In the Library of Horrific Events (2005)	No Tears for the Creatures (2008)

Professional ratings
Review scores
Source	Rating
Lambgoat	link
ThrashHits	5/6 stars

No Tears for the Creatures is the third and final studio album from UK metalcore band, Johnny Truant.

== Track listing ==
1. The Grotesque - 3:54
2. Death Rides - 3:36
3. Last Arms of the Apocalypse - 5:37
4. Widower - 1:49
5. Crush and Devour - 4:03
6. In Alcoholica - 4:52
7. Dead Ships Sinking - 5:46
8. Sunshine Diver - 3:54
9. Fog Lights - 6:43
10. The Weeping, Wailing, and Gnashing of Teeth - 7:05

== Credit ==
- Paul Jackson - Drums
- Stuart Hunter - Guitar, vocals
- Alan Booth - Bass guitar
- Reuben Gotto - Guitar
- Olly Mitchell - Vocals
- Justin Hill - Producing, Mixing, Engineering
- Dan Weller - Producing, Mixing, Engineering
- Nick Kinnish - Engineering at Brighton Electric Studios
- Wade MacNeil - additional vocals on "Widower"
