= Crisis (Alexisonfire album) =

Studio album by Alexisonfire
- Released: August 22, 2006
- Recorded: February–March 2006
- Studios: Metalworks, Mississauga, ON; Silo Recording, Ontario, Canada
- Genres: Post-hardcore; melodic hardcore
- Length: 41:37
- Labels: Distort; Vagrant
- Producers: Julius Butty; Alexisonfire

Alexisonfire chronology
| The Switcheroo Series: Alexisonfire vs. Moneen (2005) | Crisis (2006) | Old Crows / Young Cardinals (2009) |

Singles from Crisis
- 1. "Boiled Frogs" Released: July 12, 2006; 2. "This Could Be Anywhere In the World" Released: November 20, 2006; 3. "Rough Hands" Released: June 28, 2007; 4. "Drunks, Lovers, Sinners and Saints" Released: August 17, 2007

Crisis is the third studio album from Canadian post-hardcore band Alexisonfire, released on August 22, 2006.

== Background and production ==
On June 17, 2005, the band announced that drummer Jesse Ingelevics had been replaced with Jordan Hastings of Jersey. Ingelevics left citing personal reasons, while the rest of the band said they had been growing apart; Hastings had been drumming with the band for a period of time.

Recording was held at Metalworks and Silo Recording Studio in February and March 2006, with Julius Butty and the band producing the sessions. Engineer Nick Blagona was assisted by Giancarlo Gallo (who also served as the Pro Tools operator) and Brent Withcomnb; Marco Bressette performed some editing at Silo. Butty, with the aid of Withcomnb mixed the recordings, before they were mastered by Joao Carvalho at Joao Carvalho Mastering later in March 2006.

== Composition ==
The album features Planes Mistaken for Stars frontman Gared O'Donnell singing on the track "You Burn First".

The album art for Crisis features aftermath of the Great Lakes Blizzard of 1977 that hit the Niagara Region and Western New York. The main cover features the famous picture of a frostbitten man, a snowblower clearing the large accumulation of snow, and bare trees during the blizzard. Additional pictures of the event are included inside the album's booklet. The lyrics from the song "Crisis" are based on this event.

== Release ==
After appearing at The Bamboozle festival, Alexisonfire embarked on a European tour with Moneen in May and June 2006. On June 17, 2006, Crisis was announced for release in two months' time, and "Boiled Frogs" was posted on the band's Myspace profile. On July 5, 2006, it was announced that the band had signed to Vagrant. Dallas Green explained that signing with Vagrant gave the band "a fresh start for us in the U.S." In July and August, the band appeared at the Scene Music Festival in Canada, and performed on the 2006 Warped Tour. A music video was released for "This Could Be Anywhere in the World" on August 9, 2006. Crisis was released on August 22 through Distort Entertainment. The album was released in the UK on Hassle Records, while Vagrant released it in the US. Limited edition versions of the album was released, with USB flash drives that contained bonus material. The bonus material included live performances, making of videos for the music videos, and two additional songs, "Thrones" and "My God is a Reasonable Man".

Alexisonfire went on a tour of Canada in September and October 2006, with support from Every Time I Die, Cancer Bats and Attack in Black. Though Alexisonfire was scheduled to appear on the international edition of the Taste of Chaos tour, the band instead went on a co-headlining tour of the US with Moneen in October and November. They were supported by Cancer Bats. In January and February 2007, the band supported Senses Fail on their headlining US tour, before embarking on a UK tour with Comeback Kid. In March and April 2007, the band supported Anti-Flag on their War Sucks... tour of the US. They then toured Australia with Moneen and Blindspott. In June, the band went on a US tour alongside Funeral for a Friend, Emanuel and Fightstar. They then appeared at the Cutting Edge Music Festival. On June 29, 2007, the music video for "Rough Hands" was posted on their Myspace. They toured the Canadian East Coast in July 2007 with Attack in Black and Cancer Bats. In September and October, the group supported Saosin on their headlining tour of the US, and toured the UK the following month. In November 2007, the band performed at Saints & Sinners Festival, before closing out the year with a Canadian tour alongside Anti-Flag, Saosin and the Bled.

== Reception and legacy ==
Professional ratings
Review scores
| Source | Rating |
|---|---|
| AbsolutePunk | (64%) |
| AllMusic | 4/5 stars |
| Jam! | 3.5/5 stars |
| Melodic | 3/5 stars |
| Punknews.org | 4.5/5 stars |

The album debuted at #1 on the Canadian Albums Chart, selling over 20,000 copies in its first week. Crisis was certified platinum in Canada in May 2007 and their single This Could Be Anywhere in The World was certified gold in Canada in September 2018.

Crisis was voted 50th in the 50 Greatest Albums of the 21st Century in Kerrang!

The album was a big influence on Silverstein's Arrivals & Departures (2007), Cancer Bats' Hail Destroyer (2008), We Are the Ocean's Cutting Our Teeth (2010), Four Year Strong's In Some Way, Shape, or Form (2011) and 36 Crazyfists' Time and Trauma (2015).

== Track listing ==
All music and lyrics by Alexisonfire.

| No. | Title | Length |
|---|---|---|
| 1. | "Drunks, Lovers, Sinners and Saints" | 3:48 |
| 2. | "This Could Be Anywhere in the World" | 4:03 |
| 3. | "Mailbox Arson" | 3:31 |
| 4. | "Boiled Frogs" | 3:57 |
| 5. | "We Are the Sound" | 3:40 |
| 6. | "You Burn First" | 2:40 |
| 7. | "We Are the End" | 3:46 |
| 8. | "Crisis" | 3:31 |
| 9. | "Keep It on Wax" | 3:48 |
| 10. | "To a Friend" | 3:15 |
| 11. | "Rough Hands" | 5:30 |
| Total length: | | 41:37 |

Bonus USB Materials
| No. | Title | Length |
|---|---|---|
| 12. | "My God Is a Reasonable Man" | 3:04 |
| 13. | "Thrones" | 4:16 |

== Personnel ==
Personnel per booklet.

Alexisonfire

- George Pettit – unclean vocals
- Dallas Green – rhythm guitar, clean vocals, piano
- Wade MacNeil – lead guitar, clean vocals (tracks 1, 4 and 9), backing vocals
- Chris Steele – bass guitar
- Jordan Hastings – drums

Additional musicians

- Gared O'Donnell (Planes Mistaken for Stars) – additional vocals (tracks 6)
- Scott Russell – additional hand claps and gang vocals
- Julius Butty – additional vocals (tracks 2)

Production and design

- Julius Butty – producer
- Alexisonfire – producer, art direction
- Nick Blagona – engineer
- Giancarlo Gallo – assistant engineer, Pro Tools operator
- Brent Withcomnb – assistant engineer, mixing
- João Carvalho – mastering
- Marco Bressette – editor
- Garnet Armstrong – design
- Erno Rossi – white death photos
- St. Catharines Standard – white death photos
- Welland Tribune – white death photos
- The Buffalo News – white death photos

== Charts ==
Chart performance
| Chart (2006) | Peak position |
|---|---|
| Australian Albums (ARIA) | 37 |
| Canadian Albums (Billboard) | 1 |
| Scottish Albums (Official Charts) | 89 |
| UK Albums (Official Charts) | 72 |
| UK Independent Albums (Official Charts) | 5 |
| UK Rock & Metal Albums (Official Charts) | 4 |
| US Billboard 200 | 189 |
| US Heatseekers Albums (Billboard) | 5 |
| US Independent Albums (Billboard) | 18 |

== Certifications ==
Certifications
| Region | Certification | Certified units/sales |
|---|---|---|
| Canada (Music Canada) | Platinum | 100,000^{^} |
| United Kingdom (BPI) | Silver | 60,000^{‡} |
^{^} Shipments figures based on certification alone.^{‡} Sales+streaming figures based on certification alone.
