= Rough Hands =

Single by Alexisonfire

from the album Crisis
- Released: June 28, 2007
- Genre: Post-hardcore; emo
- Length: 5:30
- Label: Distort; Vagrant
- Songwriters: George Pettit; Wade MacNeil; Chris Steele; Dallas Green; Jordan Hastings
- Producers: Julius Butty; Alexisonfire

Alexisonfire singles chronology
| "Boiled Frogs" (2006) | "Rough Hands" (2007) | "Young Cardinals" (2009) |

"Rough Hands" is the eleventh and final track from post-hardcore band Alexisonfire's third album, Crisis. It was released on June 26, 2007, as a single and the music video was uploaded the next day onto their Myspace. The song tells the story of a couple arguing and splitting apart.

== Music video ==
The video was directed by Marc Ricciardelli and produced by 235 Films, and features footage of the band performing and then being projected onto various surfaces. The music video was placed on Much Music's Videos of 2007.
