= Sweet Dreams of Otherness =

Single by Alexisonfire

from the album Otherness
- Released: 10 March 2022
- Genre: Sludge metal; stoner rock
- Length: 4:44
- Label: Dine Alone
- Songwriters: Dallas Green; Jordan Hastings; Wade MacNeil; George Pettit; Chris Steele
- Producer: Alexisonfire

Alexisonfire singles chronology
"Season of the Flood" (2020)	"Sweet Dreams of Otherness" (2022)	"Reverse the Curse" (2022)

"Sweet Dreams of Otherness" is a single released by Canadian band Alexisonfire on 10 March 2022, their first single from their fifth album Otherness.

The music video was released on the same day, directed by Jay Baruchel.

== Personnel ==
- George Pettit – vocals
- Dallas Green – guitar, vocals
- Wade MacNeil – guitar, vocals
- Chris Steele – bass guitar
- Jordan Hastings – drums, percussion

== Charts ==
Chart (2022)	Peak position
Canada Rock (Billboard)	32
