= Mitch Joel =

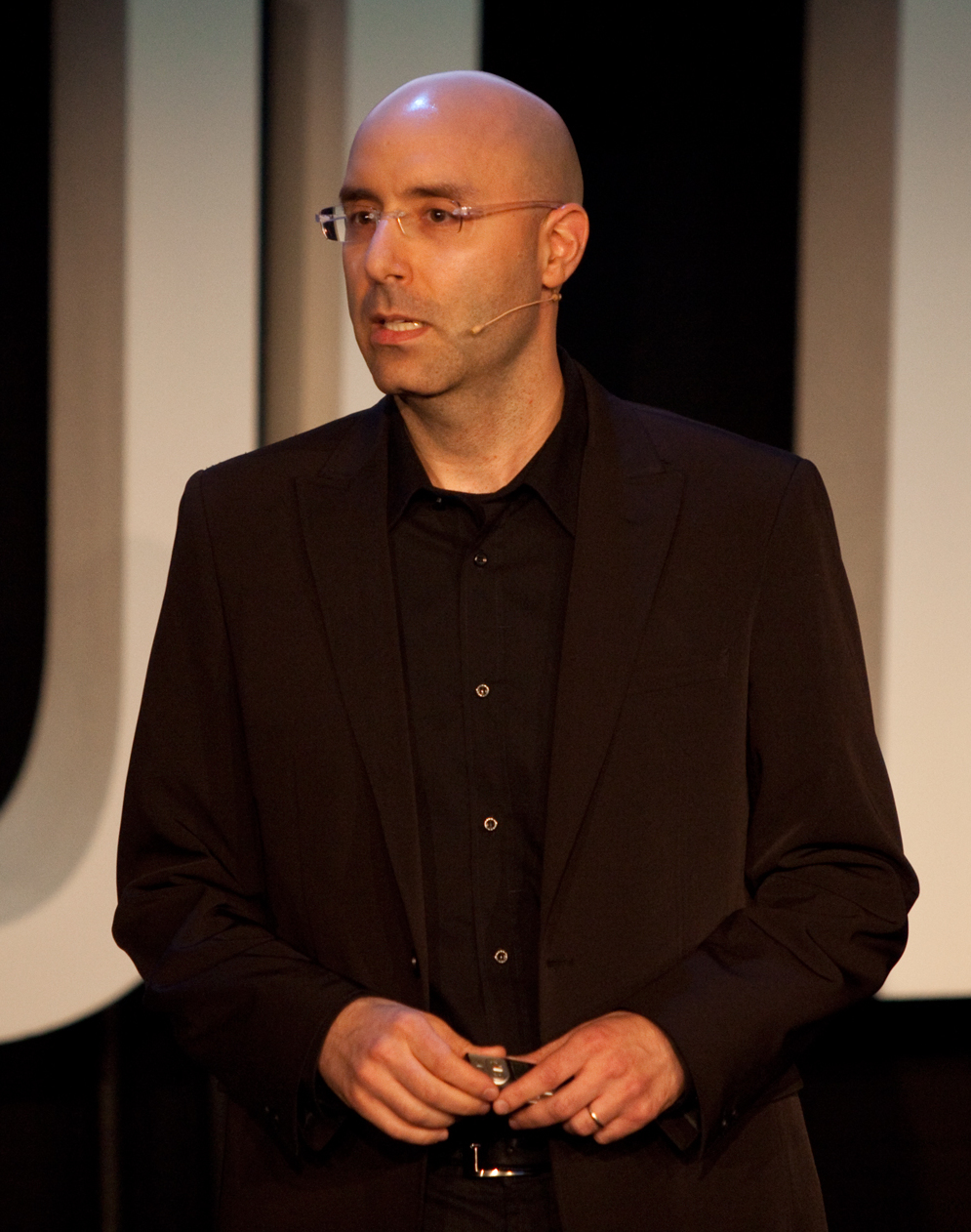
Mitch Joel, 2010

Mitch Joel (b. May 1971) is an entrepreneur and writer. He was president of Twist Image, a digital marketing agency that was purchased by WPP in 2014 and president and a founding partner of Distort Entertainment. Currently, he is a professional keynote speaker and the co-founder of ThinkersOne (a business that offers bite-sized and personalized video content from thought leaders).

== Early life, education, and early career ==
Joel grew up in Montreal, with three brothers. His family was an early adopter of computers, something that fascinated him. He graduated from the pre-university music program at Vanier College (he played bass), then he quit his philosophy studies at Concordia University after less than a semester, to start a publishing career. He worked in Montreal as a freelance music journalist and as publisher/editor of two music magazines, Arena Rock and Enrage. His first interview, in 1989, was of Tommy Lee.

== Business career ==
Joel worked in 1999 and 2000 at Mamma.com, a meta search engine started in 1996, where he held the title of Director, Sponsorship and Advertising. In January 2001 he became Director of Marketing at Airborne Entertainment, a mobile content provider headquartered in Montreal. He credits a conference called, The Power Within, in 2002 for the change in direction that lead to his success; he has been a speaker at a number of the organization's conferences since then.

In 2002, Joel joined Twist Image, a digital marketing company that was then two years old. He was president of the company, one of four equal partners. He began blogging in September 2003, posting at Six Pixels of Separation – The Twist Image Blog. In May, 2006, he launched a weekly podcast. Both the blog and podcast focus on the intersection of brands, consumers and technology.

In July 2006, Joel was named one of the twenty most influential authorities in the world on the topic of blog marketing by the UK-based research firm Onalytica. In January 2007, Marketing Magazine called Joel "Canada's Rock Star of Digital Marketing." In May 2009 he was named to the Top 40 under 40 in Canada.

By mid-2009, Twist Image had a second office, in Toronto, and employed 65 people. By October 2009 it had 90 employees. By the end of 2009, its clients included Home Depot, Microsoft, Scotiabank, TD Canada Trust, Fujifilm, and Dairy Farmers of Canada.

In 2007 and 2008, Joel was the host of Foreword Thinking: The Business And Motivational Book Review Podcast. In 2008 and 2009, he wrote a business column for the Montreal Gazette and the Vancouver Sun. In 2009, he authored a book by the same name as the blog and the podcast: Six Pixels of Separation. In 2009 and 2010 he had a column in enRoute, the in-flight magazine of Air Canada.

In May 2011, the Canadian Marketing Association elected Joel as the chair of its board of directors for 2011 and 2012. In 2013, Joel published Ctrl Alt Delete: Reboot Your Business. Reboot Your Life. Your Future Depends on It. The book covers five technology and marketing trends that Joel thinks business leaders must embrace.

In 2014, Twist Image was sold to WPP. The company rebranded as Mirum and still sits within the Wunderman Thompson division of WPP.

Mitch left the company in 2019. He is currently a professional speaker, writer, investor and advisor.

In 2021, Mitch was named to Thinkers50 Radar class for 2021.

In 2022, Mitch launched ThinkersOne - an online platform where companies can buy bite-sized and personalized thought leadership video experiences.

In 2026, Mitch became the Executive Director at the Next Era Institute.

== Distort Entertainment ==
Joel is a partner, with Greg Below, in the record label Distort Entertainment. The label, located in Toronto, Ontario, specializes in heavy music, hardcore, and post-hardcore. Artists and groups currently or previously represented by the label include Alexisonfire, Cancer Bats, Johnny Truant, Step Kings, and The Bronx.

== Personal ==
Joel is married; he and his wife have three children.
