= The Dead Heart =

- Australian 12-inch vinyl single

Single by Midnight Oil

from the album Diesel and Dust
- Released: August 1986 (AUS); 1988 (UK, U.S.)
- Genre: Folk rock; alternative rock
- Length: 5:10 (album version); 6:20 (extended version)
- Label: Columbia
- Songwriters: Rob Hirst; Jim Moginie; Peter Garrett; Martin Rotsey; Peter Gifford
- Producer: Midnight Oil

Midnight Oil singles chronology
"Best of Both Worlds" (1985)	"The Dead Heart" (1986)	"Beds Are Burning" (1987)

"The Dead Heart" is a song by Australian rock band Midnight Oil. It was first released as a single in Australia in 1986 and in the United Kingdom and the United States in 1988 after it had been included on the 1987 album, Diesel and Dust. It peaked at number 4 on the Australian singles chart and at number 11 on the U.S. Mainstream rock chart.

At the 1986 Countdown Australian Music Awards, the song was nominated for Best Single.

In January 2018, as part of Triple M's "Ozzest 100", the 'most Australian' songs of all time, "The Dead Heart" was ranked number 76.

== Original song ==
The song deals with the mistreatment of indigenous Australians and the nonrecognition of indigenous cultures in Australia, and was part of efforts to raise awareness of Australia's Stolen Generations - the forcible removal of Australian Aboriginal children from their families between 1909 and the 1970s.

Midnight Oil recorded "The Dead Heart" for the handing back ceremony of Uluru (Ayers Rock) to its traditional Aboriginal owners. The band was then invited to tour through some of the most remote communities in the Australian outback with the Aboriginal group, the Warumpi Band, a tour that was known as the Blackfella/Whitefella tour.

=== Track listing ===
7" single
No.	Title	Writer(s)	Length
1.	"The Dead Heart"	R. Hirst, J. Moginie, P. Garrett, M. Rotsey, P. Gifford	5:10
2.	"Kosciusko"	R. Hirst, J. Moginie	4:57
Total length:			10:07

12" single
No.	Title	Writer(s)	Length
1.	"The Dead Heart"	R. Hirst, J. Moginie, P. Garrett, M. Rotsey, P. Gifford	6:20
2.	"Blackfella/Whitefella" (performed by Warumpi Band)	N.Murray, G. Djilaynga	3:25
3.	"This Land" (performed by Coloured Stone)	B.Lawrie	5:00
Total length:			14:45

=== Charts ===
==== Weekly charts ====
Chart (1986–1989)	Peak position
Australia (Kent Music Report)	4
Belgium (Ultratop 50 Flanders)	20
Canada RPM Top Singles	38
France (SNEP)	19
Netherlands (Single Top 100)	40
New Zealand (Recorded Music NZ)	14
UK Singles (Official Charts)	62
U.S. Billboard Hot 100	53
U.S. Billboard Top Albums Tracks	11

==== Year-end charts ====
Chart (1986)	Rank
Australia (Kent Music Report)	30

== Alexisonfire version ==
"The Dead Heart"

Single by Alexisonfire

from the album Aussie Tour 7inch
- B-side: "(I'm) Stranded (The Saints cover)"
- Released: January 01, 2010
- Genre: Post-hardcore; alternative rock
- Length: 4:40
- Label: Dine Alone
- Songwriters: Rob Hirst; Jim Moginie; Peter Garrett; Martin Rotsey; Peter Gifford
- Producer: Alexisonfire

Alexisonfire singles chronology
"Midnight Regulations" (2010)	"The Dead Heart" (2010)	"Familiar Drugs" (2019)

For their 2010/11 Australian tour Alexisonfire released the Aussie Tour 7inch, which featured a cover of Midnight Oil's "The Dead Heart" as the lead single with a cover "I'm Stranded" by The Saints as the b-side.
