= Breached =

Canadian rock band

- Origin: Toronto, Ontario, Canada
- Genres: Hard rock
- Years active: 2010-2015
- Label: Independent
- Members: Bobby Noakes; Mike Diesel; Ryan Alexander; Neil Uppal; Phil Landry
- Website: https://breachedmusic.com (defunct)

Breached was a Canadian rock band from Toronto, Ontario, active from 2010 to 2015. Its members were Bobby Noakes (vocals), Mike Diesel (guitar/vocals), Ryan Alexander (bass), and Neil Uppal (drums). Mike Diesel was a member of the band Age of Days, and Neil Uppal was a founding member of the band Dear Jane, I....

== History ==
Breached released three EPs, and their first single (and the title track) from their third EP, "Left Behind", released in 2013, was played in rotation on the Canadian rock radio circuit, including SiriusXM's Iceberg Radio, and was featured in a CFL highlight reel (Ultimate Replay: Week 13).

In 2012, Breached began raising funds to produce a full-length album. Instead, they produced an EP of acoustic music which they called Revolution Sessions in March 2013. In June the band was featured in UK's Powerplay magazine, promoting the release.

Breached released a video on August 20, 2013, featuring drummer Neil Uppal singing popular love songs from the 1990s, and gained 16,000 views within the first week of its release.

In 2014, Breached joined Hollerado and Pup at the Sound Academy in Toronto for Fredfest, presented by 102.1 The Edge.

Breached filmed a music video for their second single, "Piece By Piece". The single and the video were released in January 2015. The video was unusual in that its ending could be chosen by the viewer.

== Discography ==
EPs

Album information
Breached EP
- Released: August 17, 2011
- Label: Independent
- Singles: "Control"
Revolution Sessions (Acoustic EP)
- Released: March 26, 2013
- Label: Independent
Left Behind EP
- Released: October 22, 2013
- Label: Independent
- Singles: "Left Behind"

Singles

Year	Song	Album
2011	"Control"	Breached EP
2013	"Left Behind"	Left Behind EP
