= The Repercussions of a Badly Planned Suicide =

The Repercussions Of A Badly Planned Suicide

Studio album by Johnny Truant
- Released: 2002
- Recorded: At Philia Studios Oxon, UK
- Genre: Metalcore
- Length: 48:50
- Labels: Undergroove Records (UK), Skull and Bones Records & Modern Music (Australia)

Johnny Truant chronology
The Repercussions Of A Badly Planned Suicide (2002)	In the Library of Horrific Events (2005)

The Repercussions of a Badly Planned Suicide is the debut album from UK metalcore band Johnny Truant.

== Track listing ==
All music written and composed by Johnny Truant. All lyrics written by Olly Mitchell.

1. "I Am The Primitologist Mr Robert Sapolsky" – 5:22
2. "Consider Us Dead" – 6:52
3. "Subtracting The Apex" – 7:01
4. "Seven Days At Knife Point" – 4:42
5. "Infamy" – 5:01
6. "Puparia" – 9:53
7. "In The Name Of Bleeding Hearts" – 9:56

== Personnel ==
=== Band members ===
- James Hunter – bass guitar
- Stuart Hunter – guitars
- Paul Jackson – drums
- Olly Mitchell – vocals

=== Other personnel ===
- Joe Gibb – mixing, mastering
- Stuart Lee – additional vocals on "Seven Days At Knife Point"
- Tim Machin – additional vocals on "Consider Us Dead"
- Aaron Turner – album cover art
