= In the Library of Horrific Events =

Studio album by Johnny Truant
- Released: October 17, 2005
- Recorded: Philia Studios, Oxon, UK
- Genre: Metalcore
- Length: 39:39
- Labels: Undergroove Records (UK) (UGCD026); Dine Alone Records (USA and Canada) Skull and Bones Records & Modern Music (Australia)
- Producer: Adam Dutkiewicz

Johnny Truant chronology
The Repercussions of a Badly Planned Suicide (2001)	In the Library of Horrific Events (2005)	No Tears for the Creatures (2008)

Professional ratings
Review scores
Source	Rating
Drowned in Sound	(7/10)

In the Library of Horrific Events is the second album by UK metalcore band, Johnny Truant, released on October 17, 2005 by Undergroove Records. It was produced by Adam Dutkiewicz of Killswitch Engage.

The album's themes are that of "love and loss, pain and hope and the tragic death of a close friend".

== Track listing ==
All tracks written by Johnny Truant.

1. "I Love You Even Though You're a Zombie Now" – 3:02
2. "The Bloodening" – 4:03
3. "Realist Surrealist" – 3:35
4. "Dirty Vampire Feeding Frenzy" – 5:04
5. "Throne Vertigo" – 2:53
6. "Vultures" – 1:24
7. "A Day in the Death" – 5:14
8. "The Necropolis Junction" – 4:39
9. "I, The Exploder" – 4:01
10. "Footprints in the Thunder" – 5:39

== Personnel ==
=== Band members ===
- James Hunter – bass guitar
- Stuart Hunter – guitars
- Paul Jackson – drums
- Olly Mitchell – vocals

=== Other personnel ===
- Adam Dutkiewicz – production, mixing, mastering
- Tank.Axe.Love – artwork, layout, album design
