= Alexis Fire =

American pornographic film actress

- Occupations: Pornographic film actress; sex worker

Alexis Fire is an American pornographic film actress and sex worker at the Moonlite Bunny Ranch. She began performing around 2000, and has since appeared in around 35 films.

== Career ==
She appeared on the HBO documentary Cathouse, about the Moonlite Bunny Ranch, a brothel near Carson City, Nevada. She has also appeared on Playboy Nightcalls, Playboy 411, the BBC documentary Sex, Warts and Everything, The Jenny Jones Show, Showtime's Family Business, The Dr. Keith Ablow Show, The Daily Show, and as a featured Lactating Contortionist on The Learning Channel documentary Body Benders.

In 2004 she broke her heel while practicing a dance routine for the Exotic Erotic Ball, after jumping from a 15-foot ledge and missing the floor padding.

She is also the inspiration for the band Alexisonfire's name.
