= Greg Below =

- Origin: Canada
- Occupation(s): Businessman, show promoter, music producer
- Labels: Distort Entertainment

Greg Below is the president and founding partner of Distort Entertainment, Canadian show promoter and music producer. Greg is known for his height and enthusiastic love of music (especially metal).

== Distort Entertainment ==
Greg and his partner, Mitch Joel decided to form Distort Entertainment after being introduced by a journalist friend of Mitch's. Below called Mitch shortly after meeting him with the proposal to start a record label. Later became Distort Inc.

Distort Inc. specializes in heavy music, hardcore, and post-hardcore. Located in Toronto Ontario, Distort Entertainment is well known for its influence in the underground music market. Some artists and groups currently or once represented by the label are: Alexisonfire, Cancer Bats, Comeback Kid, Johnny Truant, Architects, Step Kings, and The Bronx. Below has in recent years started a sister division, Distort Light, in order to include bands like Bend Sinister.

"his enthusiasm was amazing. We’re probably a bit of an experiment of a band for him, because I know Greg and he just loves good music. He’s trying to branch out and have more bands from different genres, but his main love is metal" - Dan Moxon (Vocalist/Keyboard From Bend Sinister) Quote from Exclaim Magazine

== Distort Productions ==
Similarly named, Distort Productions also owned by Below, is a concert promotion company which is known for bringing acts like Slipknot and System Of A Down to Canada. Acourding to an interview with Mitch Joel, Distort Entertainment's name was derived from Distort Productions, which was already established prior to Joel and Below becoming partners.

"We like the name" - Mitch Joel (Greg's business partner) Quote from a Metal-Rules Interviews

== See also ==
Official Distort Entertainment Web Page
