= Watch Out! (Alexisonfire album) =

Studio album by Alexisonfire
- Released: June 8, 2004
- Studio: Julius Butty's house
- Genre: Post-hardcore
- Length: 42:24
- Labels: Distort; Equal Vision
- Producers: Alexisonfire; Julius Butty

Alexisonfire chronology
Alexisonfire (2002)	Watch Out! (2004)	The Switcheroo Series: Alexisonfire vs. Moneen (2005)

Singles from Watch Out!
- 1. "Accidents" Released: April 4, 2004; 2. "No Transitory" Released: December 7, 2004; 3. ""Hey, It's Your Funeral Mama"" Released: September 12, 2005

Watch Out! is the second studio album from Canadian post-hardcore band Alexisonfire, released on June 8, 2004. The album debuted at number 6 on the Canadian Albums Chart, selling 6,580 copies in its first week of release, and was certified Platinum (indicating sales of over 100,000 copies) by the Canadian Recording Industry Association (CRIA) in 2007.

== Background and production ==
Alexisonfire released their self-titled debut studio album in October 2002. It spawned music videos for "Pulmonary Archery", "Counterparts and Number Them", and "Water Wings (And Other Poolside Fashion Faux Pas)", all of which achieved success on the TV channel MuchMusic and its sister channel MuchLoud. The album would eventually sell 30,000 copies in Canada, and peak at number 127 in that country. Throughout 2003, the band promoted the album with two Canadian tours, and four treks across the United States.

For their next album, the band were told to go with a popular producer, and to record at a big studio. Instead, Watch Out! was produced by the band and Julius Butty; sessions were held at Butty's home studio close to Hamilton, Ontario. Butty also acted as engineer and mixer; Brett Zilahi mastered the album.

== Music and lyrics ==
Watch Out! is a post-hardcore album, which saw more of a focus on Green's melodic singing, and less emphasis on Pettit's screaming. According to guitarist Wade MacNeil, the closing track of their debut, "Pulmonary Archery", incorporated the "atmospheric sound" that the band expanded upon with Watch Out!. Pettit expanded on this by the saying the band were listening to a lot of ambient rock acts, such as the Appleseed Cast and Mogwai. "Accidents" was written in the basement of MacNeil's mother's house. "Side Walk When She Walks" uses metal guitar riffs and different tempo changes. "No Transitory" opens mid-screaming. "Sharks and Danger" is a darker track that was reminiscent of "Spike" (2003) by the Network.

Lyrical themes explored on the album include soul-searching.

== Release ==
In March 2004, the group went on the Equal Vision Records Tour with Bane, Armor for Sleep and Silent Drive. On April 19, 2004, Watch Out! was announced for release in two months' time. Alongside this, the album's track listing was posted online. In April and May 2004, the band went on a tour of Canada with Boys Night Out and Blue Skies at War. On May 27, 2004, "Accidents" was made available for download. In May and June 2004, the band went on tour with Silverstein, Emery, the Higher, and Hawthorne Heights. Watch Out! was released in Canada on June 8, 2004, through Distort Entertainment with distribution from EMI Music Canada. The US release occurred three weeks later, through Equal Vision Records. The following month, the band appeared at Hellfest, and a music video for "Accidents" was released to video outlets. In September and October 2004, they went on a Canadian tour, dubbed the Bored with the U.S.A Tour, with Moneen, Hopesfall and Closet Monster.

Following this, the band supported Hot Water Music on their headlining North American tour for two months, and appeared at The Fest. They played two shows in Australia, before embarking on a tour of the United Kingdom with the Bled and ending the year with a few Canadian gigs. Between January and April 2005, Alexisonfire toured the US West Coast with Rise Against, the US East Coast with Emanuel, the Black Maria and Codeseven, and a tour of Canada with Rise Against. Alexisonfire and Rise Against then toured across Europe in April and May 2005. The band toured Canada in September 2005 with the Used and Underoath, which was followed with a headlining tour of Europe the next month. They closed out the year with a US tour in November 2005 with A Wilhelm Scream, the Receiving End of Sirens, Idiot Pilot, and 3.

== Reception ==
Professional ratings
Review scores
Source	Rating
AllMusic	3.5/5 stars
Chart Attack	Favorable
IGN	7.2/10
NeuFutur	4.9/10
Now	3/5
Ox-Fanzine	7/10
Punknews.org	4.5/5 stars

Watch Out! was met with generally favourable reviews from music critics. AllMusic reviewer Johnny Loftus wrote that the band "discovered a new yen for moody exploration, and fill the middle of Watch Out! with battered water wings that float on waves of emotion and reverb", though the album "really only refines what Alexisonfire already had the chops and lyrical potential for." Keith Carman of Chart Attack opened his review by stating that the "worst part" about the album was that it was "a massive step up" from their debut. He added that it was "[m]ore experimental without alienating their inherent style," with a "stronger fusion of thunderous metal riffs and throat-tearing vocals". IGN's JR called the album "a fine disc, but boy, things have changed." He went on to note the increase on melodic vocals and the decrease in screaming, which was "a major adjustment, but it makes Watch Out! feel considerably more balanced".

Ox-Fanzine writer Christian Meinders said that the band "perfected their style [of screamo], to put it positively, or the edges that could still be heard on the debut were rounded off to put it less positively." Punknews.org staff member Jordan Rogowski wrote that issues with their debut, such as lack of replay ability and poor production, were "remedied this time around." He went on further to add that "[e]very screamed vocal, and every single chord is dripping with passion and urgency, and it's all put together masterfully." Dylan Young of Now noted that the "very qualities that strengthened this screamo band's debut are intact: the music is anthemic, the screaming fury impossibly difficult to understand, and the lyrics (when discernable) slightly above par."

The album debuted at number 6 on the Canadian Albums Chart, selling 6,580 copies in its first week of release. By April 2005, it had sold 50,000 copies in Canada, and 27,500 copies in the US. It was certified Platinum in Canada in April 2007.

== Track listing ==
All songs written by Alexisonfire.

No.	Title	Length
1.	"Accidents"	4:09
2.	"Control"	3:43
3.	"It Was Fear of Myself That Made Me Odd"	3:55
4.	"Side Walk When She Walks"	4:22
5.	""Hey, It's Your Funeral Mama""	4:22
6.	"No Transitory"	3:16
7.	"Sharks and Danger"	4:39
8.	"That Girl Possessed"	3:26
9.	"White Devil"	3:35
10.	"Get Fighted"	3:05
11.	"Happiness by the Kilowatt"	5:12

Japanese bonus track

No.	Title	Length
12.	"Sharks and Danger" (extended version)	5:04

== Personnel ==
Personnel per booklet.

Alexisonfire

- George Pettit – unclean vocals
- Dallas Green – rhythm guitar, clean vocals
- Wade MacNeil – lead guitar, backing vocals
- Chris Steele – bass
- Jesse Ingelevics – drums

Production and design

- Alexisonfire – producer
- Julius Butty – producer, engineer, mixer
- Brett Zilahi – mastering
- Justin Winstanley – art concept, illustrations
- Garnet Armstrong – design

== Charts ==
Chart performance for Watch Out!
Chart (2004)	Peak position
Canadian Albums (Billboard)	6
US Heatseekers Albums (Billboard)	25
US Independent Albums (Billboard)	21

Chart performance for Alexisonfire/Watch Out!
Chart (2007)	Peak position
UK Independent Albums (Official Charts)	28
UK Rock & Metal Albums (Official Charts)	27

== Certifications ==
Certifications and sales for Watch Out!
Region	Certification	Certified units/sales
Canada (Music Canada)	Platinum	100,000^{^}
^{^} Shipments figures based on certification alone.
