= Familiar Drugs =

Single by Alexisonfire
- Released: 15 February 2019
- Genre: Sludge metal
- Length: 4:19
- Label: Dine Alone
- Songwriters: Dallas Green; Jordan Hastings; Wade MacNeil; George Pettit; Chris Steele
- Producer: Karl Bareham

Alexisonfire singles chronology
"The Dead Heart" (2010)	"Familiar Drugs" (2019)	"Complicit" (2019)

"Familiar Drugs" is a single released by Canadian band Alexisonfire on 15 February 2019, their first release of original music in almost 10 years. Lead vocalist George Pettit described the song as being about "being at a point in your life where you know you can make a change yet choosing to not make that change."

The music video was released on 16 April 2019, directed by Michael Maxxis and was shot using VHS tape and cellphones.

== Personnel ==
- George Pettit – lead vocals
- Dallas Green – rhythm guitar, vocals
- Wade MacNeil – lead guitar, backing vocals
- Chris Steele – bass guitar
- Jordan Hastings – drums, percussion
- Jill Zimmermann – recording engineer
- Darren Magierowski – recording engineer
- Jacquire King – mix engineer

== Chart performance ==
Chart (2019)	Peak position
Canada Rock (Billboard)	50
