= Dear Jane, I... =

- Origin: Mississauga, Ontario, Canada
- Genres: Rock
- Years active: 2003–2007
- Labels: Verona Records
- Past members: Jeremy Dove; James Wells; Neil Uppal; Mark Cohene; Kat Lucas; Glenn Kevin Angeles; Phil Paluszkiewicz; Alan Riches; Vartevar Sarkissian; Heather De Jong; Paul Davidson; Tim LeClaire

Dear Jane, I... was a Canadian rock band that was formed in early 2003. The band's final known lineup included Jeremy Dove (vocals), James Wells (guitar/vocals), Kat Lucas (guitar/vocals), Mark Cohene (bass guitar) and Neil Uppal (drums).

Their first EP, released independently in 2004, is Don't Know How to Begin. The video for their single "Stayed Up All Night" was in rotation on MuchLOUD and on MusiquePlus.

The band is currently signed to the Oakville, Ontario, based record label Verona Records (owned and operated by Shane Told of the band Silverstein). They have released one full-length album through the label, entitled Hope This Reaches You In Time (produced by Julius Butty), which reached No. 183 on the Canadian Billboard Top 200 chart for its first week of sales. The video for their single, "Wish Black Wishes", was not accepted for rotation on MuchMusic, but remained viewable online at their website and on YouTube.

Despite numerous line-up changes, the band continued to tour and promote their first full-length album throughout 2006–2007. The band stopped performing in mid-2007 after the continuous line-up changes proved difficult for the original members.

Founding member Neil Uppal currently plays in the Toronto-based band Breached, and fill-in guitarist Kat Lucas is currently playing guitar and keyboards for Pink.

== Discography ==
=== Albums ===
Album information
Don't Know How To Begin
- Released: July 11, 2004
- Label: Independent
- Singles: "Stayed Up All Night"
Hope This Reaches You In Time
- Released: March 17, 2006
- Label: Verona Records \ Sonic Unyon
- Singles: "Wish Black Wishes"
- Peak Chart Position: 183

=== Singles ===
Year	Song	Album
2004	"Stayed Up All Night"	Don't Know How To Begin
2006	"Wish Black Wishes"	Hope This Reaches You In Time
