= Black Lungs =

Canadian punk band

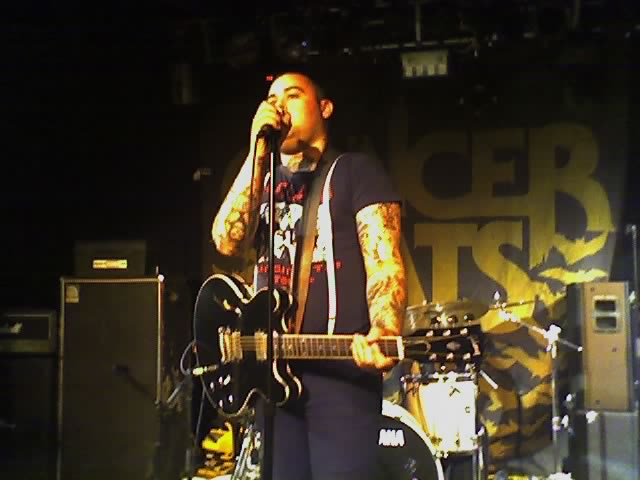
- Black Lungs performing in 2008

Background information
- Origin: St. Catharines, Ontario
- Genres: Punk rock, folk punk, hardcore punk
- Years active: 2005–present
- Label: Dine Alone
- Spinoff of: Alexisonfire
- Members: Wade MacNeil; Phil Waring; George Clark; Scott Savarie
- Past members: George Pettit; Sammi Bogdanski; Ian Romano; Jordan "Ratbeard" Hastings; Sean McNab; Pat Pengelly; Liam Cormier
- Website: www.wademacneil.com

Black Lungs is a Canadian punk rock band, formed by Alexisonfire guitarist and vocalist and Gallows vocalist Wade MacNeil. MacNeil originally envisioned the project's music as similar to his first punk rock band, Plan 9.

== History ==
MacNeil formed Black Lungs with original members percussionist Jordan Hastings, keyboardists Sammi Bogdanski, and Alexisonfire's George Pettit on bass. The side project released their first studio album Send Flowers, in May 2008, on Dine Alone Records with Ian Romano on drums. The band toured afterwards to support the album with Liam Cormier on drums. Bedouin Soundclash's former drummer, Pat Pengelly later drummed with the band.

In 2008, Black Lung released a limited edition 7-inch vinyl with two songs. A second two-song 7-inch vinyl entitled Valley of the Dolls was released, through Deranged Records. in 2010. On March 8, 2011, Wade announced a Split EP with fellow Canadians, Cancer Bats.

In 2011, Black Lungs began recording their second album with producer Nick Blagona. After recording the album, titled Pagan Holiday, it was shelved for over four years before being released online for free on Halloween of 2015.

== Band members ==
Current

- Wade MacNeil - lead vocals, lead guitars & bass (2005–present)
- Phil Waring - bass (2009–present)
- Scott Savarie - rhythm guitar (2011–present)
- George Clark - drums, percussion (2011–present)

Former

- George Pettit - rhythm guitar, backing vocals (2005–2006, 2008–2009)
- Jordan "Ratbeard" Hastings - drums, percussion (2005–2006)
- Sean "Sickboy" McNab - bass (2005–2006)
- Liam Cormier - drums, percussion (2008)
- Haris Cehajic - keyboards, piano (2008–2009)
- Sammi Bogdanski - keyboards, piano (2008)
- Ian Romano - drums, percussion (2008)
- Pat Pengelly - drums, percussion (2008–2011)

== Discography ==
- Send Flowers (2008)
- 7-inch EP (June 2008)
- Valley of the Dolls (2010)
- Black Lungs/Cancer Bats Split EP(March 2011)
- Pagan Holiday (2015)

== Videography ==
- Hold Fast (Sink or Swim) (2008)
- For Her (2008)
