= Blackstorm =

- Origin: Yuendumu, Australia
- Genres: Rock, Blues
- Label: CAAMA Music
- Members: Gordon Robertson (Vocals/Bass); Micah Hudson (Guitar); Donovan Rice (Keyboards); Sebastian Poulson (Drums)

Blackstorm are an Australian rock/blues band from Yuendumu in the Northern Territory. The members are Warlpiri and their songs are sung in Warlpiri and English. The band was nominated for a Deadly Award for Best Band in 2001.

Music from Blackstorm and its members were used in the Bush Mechanics shows.

Both Rice and Robertson also work as artists.

== Discography ==
- Desert Calling (1995) and remastered in 2020 - CAAMA.
- Highway To Nowhere (2001) - CAAMA
