= The Gorgeous =

Former Canadian metalcore band

- Origin: Vancouver/Kelowna, British Columbia, Canada
- Genres: Metalcore; Post-hardcore; Southern rock
- Years active: 2003–2007
- Label: Distort Entertainment
- Past members: Jordan Daniel; Dali Shaw; Julien Brousseau; Miguel Shaw; Hal Ferris; Kevin Keegan

The Gorgeous were a Canadian metalcore band formed in 2003 in Vancouver and Kelowna, British Columbia. The band consisted of vocalist Jordan Daniel, guitarist Dali Shaw, bassist Julien Brousseau, and drummer Miguel Shaw. Later members included guitarist Hal Ferris and guitarist Kevin Keegan.

== History ==
The band recorded a five-song demo at Flying Monkey Studio in Kelowna before taking a hiatus of approximately one year. The following summer, the members relocated to Montreal, Quebec, where they resumed performing and recruited Hal Ferris as a second guitarist. The group later signed with Distort Entertainment and, in 2005, recorded the album Great Lakes at Silo Studios in Stoney Creek, Ontario.

Following the album’s release, The Gorgeous toured across Canada and, in January 2007, toured the United Kingdom as direct support for the band Architects. Prior to the tour, guitarist Hal Ferris left the group and was replaced by Kevin Keegan, who had previously performed with A Javelin Reign and Bend Sinister. The band later recorded additional demo material intended to promote a planned future release.

In 2007, The Gorgeous toured with the band Cancer Bats. On March 7, 2007, the band announced on its MySpace page that it would disband.

Following the breakup, Kevin Keegan later performed with the bands Barn Burner and Dead Quiet. Julien Brousseau worked as a sound technician for Cancer Bats and performed in the band Pup. Miguel Shaw participated in several independent bands, while Hal Ferris performed in various black metal projects. Jordan Daniel later performed blues- and folk-influenced music under the name The Boogieman Jordan Daniel.

== Discography ==
- Skyline Shoreline
- Great Lakes (November 22, 2005) - Distort Entertainment

== Videography ==
- 2006 Shy Guys
- 2006 Lake Ontario
- 2007 Great Minds
