= Johnny Truant =

British metalcore band

- Origin: Brighton, England
- Genres: Metalcore
- Years active: 2000–2008
- Labels: United by Fate Records; Ferret Music; Distort Entertainment; Undergroove Records; Dine Alone Records
- Members: Paul Jackson; Stuart Hunter; Alan 'Nailz' Booth; Reuben Gotto; Olly Mitchell
- Past members: Al Kilcullen; James Hunter

Johnny Truant was a British metalcore band, formed in 2000 under the name Severance. The band recorded three demos under this moniker before renaming themselves after one of the main characters of Mark Z. Danielewski's novel House of Leaves. The band recorded their debut release The Repercussions of a Badly Planned Suicide (which featured three remixed songs from their second demo) in 2002 which was released on Undergroove Records. Their second album, In the Library of Horrific Events was produced by Killswitch Engage guitarist, Adam Dutkiewicz. The band have toured the UK, Europe and Canada with the likes of Killswitch Engage, As I Lay Dying, Cancer Bats and Alexisonfire as well as playing Download Festival in 2005, 2006 and 2008. Although the band started out as a four-piece, at the start of 2006, Al Kilcullen was added as a second guitarist. As of June 2006, however, Kilcullen was replaced by Reuben Gotto. The band signed to United By Fate Records in the UK and Distort Entertainment in Canada. Their third album titled No Tears for the Creatures was recorded in Brighton Electric throughout November 2007. It was produced and mixed by Dan Weller and Justin Hill of WellerHill productions and at the time both members of Sikth. It was released on 2 June, however the album leaked onto the internet weeks beforehand.

The band then signed to Ferret Music in the US and released No Tears for the Creatures on 30 September 2008.

They were set to support Bring Me the Horizon in the US with Misery Signals and The Ghost Inside, however on 31 October 2008, the band unexpectedly announced on their Myspace that they were to split following their December UK tour. The band played their final show on 17 December 2008.

== Members ==
Final line-up

- Paul Jackson – drums (2000–2008)
- Stuart Hunter – guitar, vocals (2000–2008)
- Alan "Nailz" Booth – bass guitar (2007–2008)
- Reuben Gotto – guitar (2006–2008)
- Oliver Mitchell – vocals (2000–2008)

Former

- Al Kilcullen – guitar (2006)
- James Hunter – bass (2000–2007)

== Discography ==
Studio albums

- The Repercussions of a Badly Planned Suicide (2002) Undergroove Records
- In the Library of Horrific Events (2005) Undergroove Records - UK / (2006) Dine Alone Records - Canada
- No Tears for the Creatures (2008) United by Fate Records - UK / Distort Entertainment - Canada / Ferret Music - USA

EPs

- Insecta Evolution (2001), self-released
