= Julius Butty =

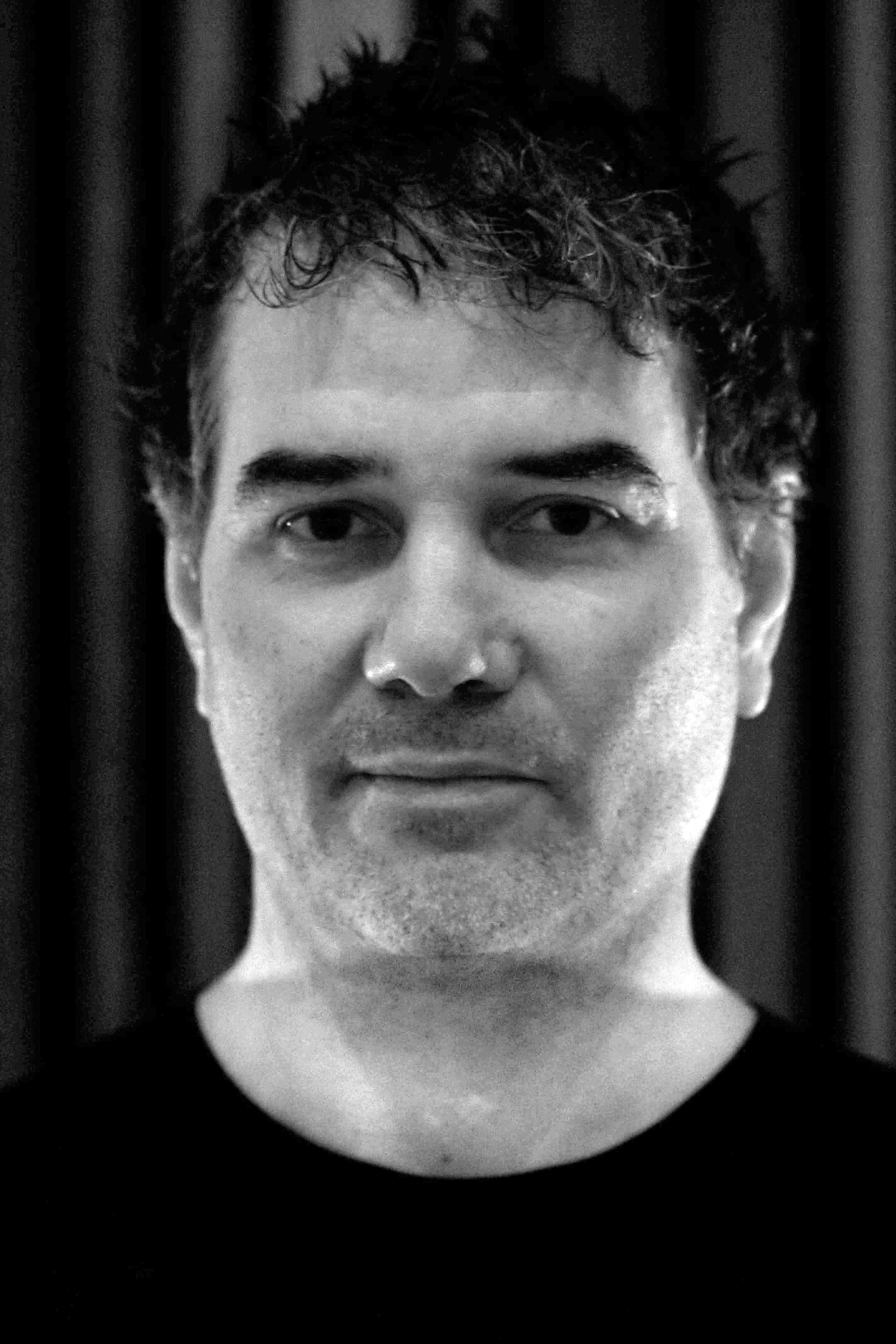

Background information
- Origin: Canada
- Occupation: Record producer

Julius Butty is a Canadian record producer. From 2004 through 2016, he was the owner/producer of Silo Recording Studio. In late 2016, he began work on his new recording studio and in August 2018 ARC Recording Studio opened in Hamilton, Ontario.

== Production credits ==
- Kristin Nicholls Band
- Alexisonfire
- The Gorgeous
- Sleeper Set Sail
- Hypodust
- Dear Jane, I...
- Navy
- Kobra and the Lotus
- Senate
- Haddonfield
- A Day and Deathwish
- Ceremonial Snips
- Rise Over Run
- Jude the Obscure
- Murder Thy Maker
- Don't Tell Sarah
- The Kaputniks
- Sumo Cyco
- City and Colour
- Protest the Hero
- Callahan
- Marcio Novelli
- Varga
- Hunter Valentine
- Pacific Estate
- Sarasin
