= Alexisonfire =

Canadian post-hardcore band

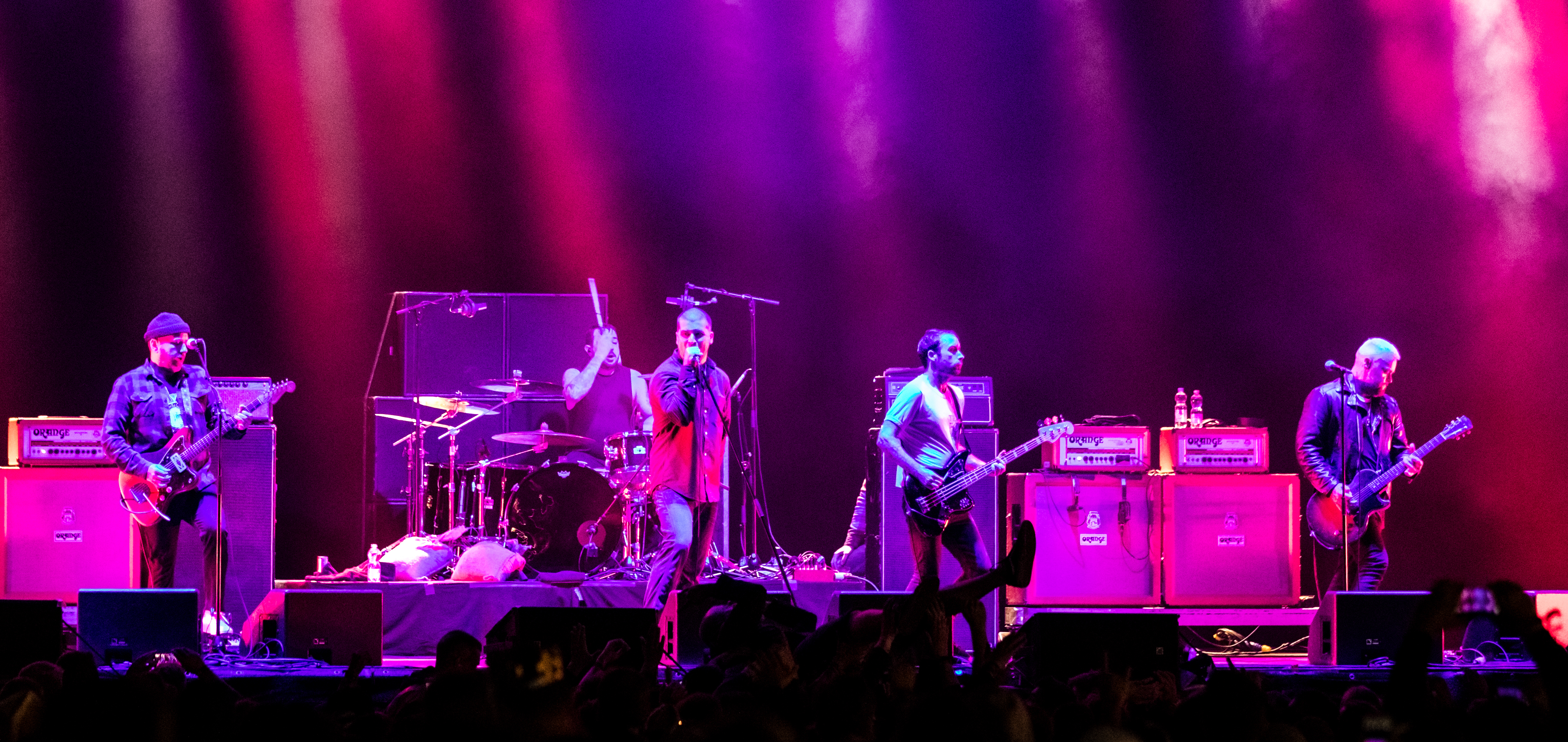
- Alexisonfire performing in 2018

Background information
- Origin: St. Catharines, Ontario, Canada
- Genres: Post-hardcore; screamo; melodic hardcore; emo
- Works: Alexisonfire discography
- Years active: 2001–2011; 2012; 2015–present
- Labels: Dine Alone; Distort; Vagrant; Equal Vision
- Spinoffs: Black Lungs
- Members: Dallas Green; Wade MacNeil; George Pettit; Chris Steele; Jordan Hastings
- Past members: Jesse Ingelevics
- Website: theonlybandever.com

Alexisonfire (pronounced "Alexis on Fire") is a Canadian post-hardcore band formed in St. Catharines, Ontario, in 2001. The band's members are Dallas Green (vocals, rhythm guitar, keyboards), Wade MacNeil (lead guitar, vocals), George Pettit (vocals), Chris Steele (bass) and Jordan Hastings (drums, percussion). The band has won numerous awards, and in Canada their albums have all been certified either gold or platinum.

Blending aggressive and melodic elements, they gained popularity with their self-titled debut album in 2002, featuring their breakthrough single "Pulmonary Archery". Their second album, Watch Out! (2004), brought commercial success in Canada, while their third release, Crisis (2006), debuted at No. 1 on the Canadian Albums Chart and solidified their international reputation. Old Crows / Young Cardinals (2009) continued their evolution with a heavier and more experimental sound. After disbanding in 2011, the band reunited for a series of shows before officially reforming in 2015. They released Otherness in 2022, their first full-length album in over a decade, marking an amalgamation of their signature sound with new creative directions.

== History ==
=== Alexisonfire (2001–2003) ===
Alexisonfire was formed in late 2001 in the aftermath of a three-band break up. Pettit was playing guitar in a metal band called Condemning Salem, Green was lead singer and guitar player in Helicon Blue, and MacNeil and Steele played in a punk band called Plan 9. These bands broke up at the same time, and Pettit, Steele, MacNeil and Green recruited drummer Jesse Ingelevics, and formed Alexisonfire. The band's name was derived from Alexis Fire, a pornographic actress. When Fire discovered that they were using her website name as their band name, she threatened to sue, but it was discovered that the moniker was not a registered trademark, and no further action took place.

In 2002, the band released its first EP, Math Sheets Demo, so named because the CD was wrapped in Jesse Ingelevics' math homework. This caught the attention of recording engineer Greg Below and Montreal journalist Mitch Joel, who were setting up the record label Distort Entertainment and were looking for artists. Below was also working with EMI, which allowed the band to record at the company's in-house studio, and land a co-publishing and distribution deal.

On October 31, 2002, Alexisonfire was released. Although there was a distribution deal with EMI, the album's success was mostly attributed to word-of-mouth. They had already been playing dates in Ontario and New York with bands like Gwar, Juliana Theory and Glassjaw; 2003 saw them touring in support of the album, crossing Canada twice, playing with Spitalfield and Billy Talent, appearing at Hellfest, and touring Europe with Rise Against.

In October 2005, Alexisonfire was certified Gold in Canada, marking over 50,000 sales. (In 2014, Dine Alone Records released a remastered version of the album.)

At the 2004 Canadian Independent Music Awards, the video for the album's song "Pulmonary Archery" won Best Video. They were named Favourite Indie Band at the CASBY Awards, and the video for the song "Counterparts and Number Them" was nominated for Best Independent Video at the MuchMusic Video Awards.

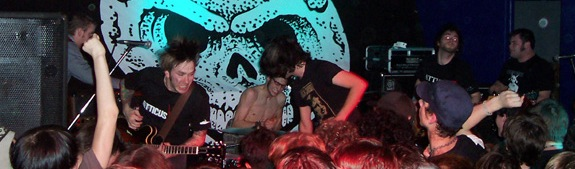
Original lineup playing at L3 Niteclub in St. Catharines, January 2004.

=== Watch Out! (2004–2005) ===
Alexisonfire recorded their second album with Julius Butty at his Silo Studios near Hamilton, Ontario. Watch Out! was released worldwide on June 29, 2004, mainly through Distort but through Equal Vision Records in the US, and Sorepoint Records in the UK. It debuted at No. 6 on the Nielsen Soundscan Top 200, sold 6,000 copies in its first week, received Gold certification in Canada in twelve weeks, and Platinum in 2007. The critical reception came from the fact that the band was more focused from the eighteen months of touring, helping them harness more aggression, release more emotion, and fine-tune all the tracks. The album was seen as a departure from their debut album, and was a critical success.

As soon as the album was released, the band went on tour, playing the Vans Warped Tour on several US dates, and then heading to the UK, playing the Reading and Leeds Festivals and other British gigs. The band spent all of 2005 on the road, touring the UK, US, Canada and Europe. They also played the Summer Sonic Festival in Japan.

On June 14, 2005, Alexisonfire posted a statement on their website stating that founding drummer Jesse Ingelevics had left the band. He was replaced by Jordan Hastings, late of the band Jersey.

At the MuchMusic Video Awards, the video for the song "Accidents" won Best Independent Video, and the band was nominated for the Peoples' Choice Award – Favourite Canadian Group. At the Juno Awards of 2005, Alexisonfire won the award for New Group of the Year.

=== Crisis (2006–2007) ===
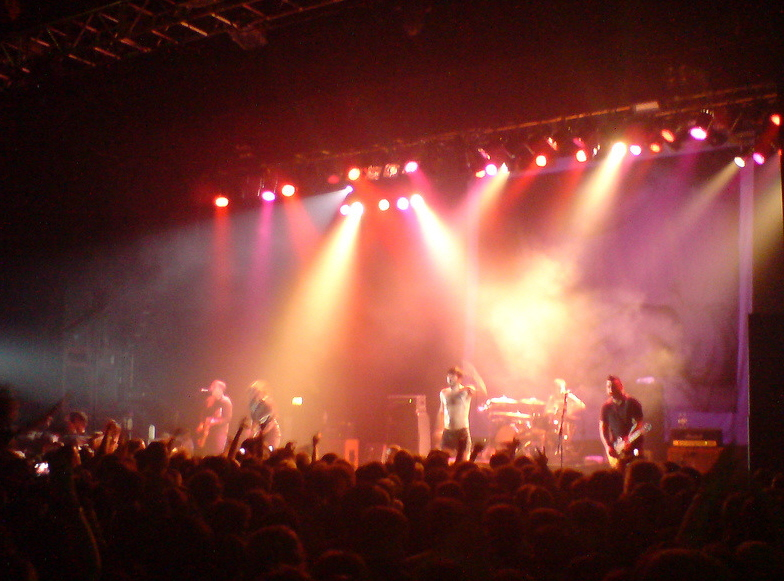
Alexisonfire performing in 2007.

On August 22, 2006, the band released their third album, Crisis, which received rave reviews and continues to be deemed 'important'.

The album's release was marked with a party on a boat on the River Thames in London, England. This also launched a ten-month world tour that took them through the UK, Australia, Canada and the US. They were now playing to crowds of up to 80,000 people, at the Reading and Leeds Festivals, Festival d'été de Québec, and they headlined at the Brixton Academy in London. They played the Warped Tour, the Taste of Chaos tour, the Saints & Sinners Festival and Australia's Soundwave festival. At this point, they were one of the most popular bands in Canada.

The band toured with Anti-Flag, Saosin, the Bled, Norma Jean, Every Time I Die, Cancer Bats, Attack in Black, Moneen, Envy on the Coast, A Change of Pace, the Ghost of a Thousand and the Dear & Departed, among others.

At this time, Pettit told a reporter: "The next record, I think, is us pretty much wanting to put the knife in screamo. I don't want to be the band that saves it, I want to be the band that kills it." Pettit later regretted making the statement.

At the 2006 CASBY Awards, Crisis won Favorite New Indie Release. At the 2007 MuchMusic Video Awards, the video for "This Could Be Anywhere in the World" won the award for Best Cinematography and was nominated for Best Rock Video. The band was also nominated for the Peoples' Choice Award – Favourite Canadian Group. At the Juno Awards of 2007, Crisis garnered a nomination for CD/DVD Artwork Design of the Year, Julius Butty received a Producer of the Year nomination for "This Could Be Anywhere in the World", and Alexisonfire was nominated for Group of the Year.

=== Old Crows/Young Cardinals and Dog's Blood (2008–2010) ===
In 2008, MacNeil told a Bombshell Zine interviewer: "Alexis hasn't broken up, but we'll see what happens. We are at a crossroads now." As a result, by 2009, rumours that Alexisonfire was about to break up abounded, but the band announced the name of their new album on February 1. They began recording Old Crows/Young Cardinals on the same day. By March 1, the recording process was near completion and two songs were announced: "Midnight Regulations" and "Emerald St." On March 31, 2009, it was confirmed that Alexisonfire had signed to Dine Alone Records, whose founder, Joel Carriere, had once been the band's manager.

On April 20, Alexisonfire released the song "Young Cardinals" for radio airplay. The music video premiered on MuchOnDemand on May 15, 2009; the album was released on June 23, 2009, and was very well received.

The band then went on a 300-date tour through Europe, the US and Canada, which lasted through December 2010.

In 2008, Dallas Green told Canoe.ca that he had sketched out new songs that he hoped would take the band into "new, weird territories". These songs would become the four-track EP Dogs Blood, which was released in 2010. The band announced the release of Dogs Blood at the 2009 Verge Awards, hosted by The Verge (XM), where Old Crows/Young Cardinals was nominated for Album of the Year and the band was nominated as Artist of the Year. At the Juno Awards of 2010, Old Crows/Young Cardinals was nominated as Rock Album of the Year.

On February 16, 2010, the band was set to play a free all-ages show at the 2010 Winter Olympics venue Live City Yaletown when, seconds into the show, the rush of the audience broke a barrier and people were trampled; 20 were slightly injured. Alexisonfire returned to Vancouver later that year as headliners at the PNE Forum.

Also in 2010, the band released a collection of six songs available exclusively through iTunes as a digital download. The EP, iTunes Originals, contained previously recorded material from the group's discography, versions of some of their previously released songs performed slightly differently, and interviews with the band. On November 22, 2010, a digital version of their Aussie Tour 7" was released on iTunes. It contains two cover songs, originally by Midnight Oil and the Saints.

=== Disbandment and farewell tour (2011–2012) ===
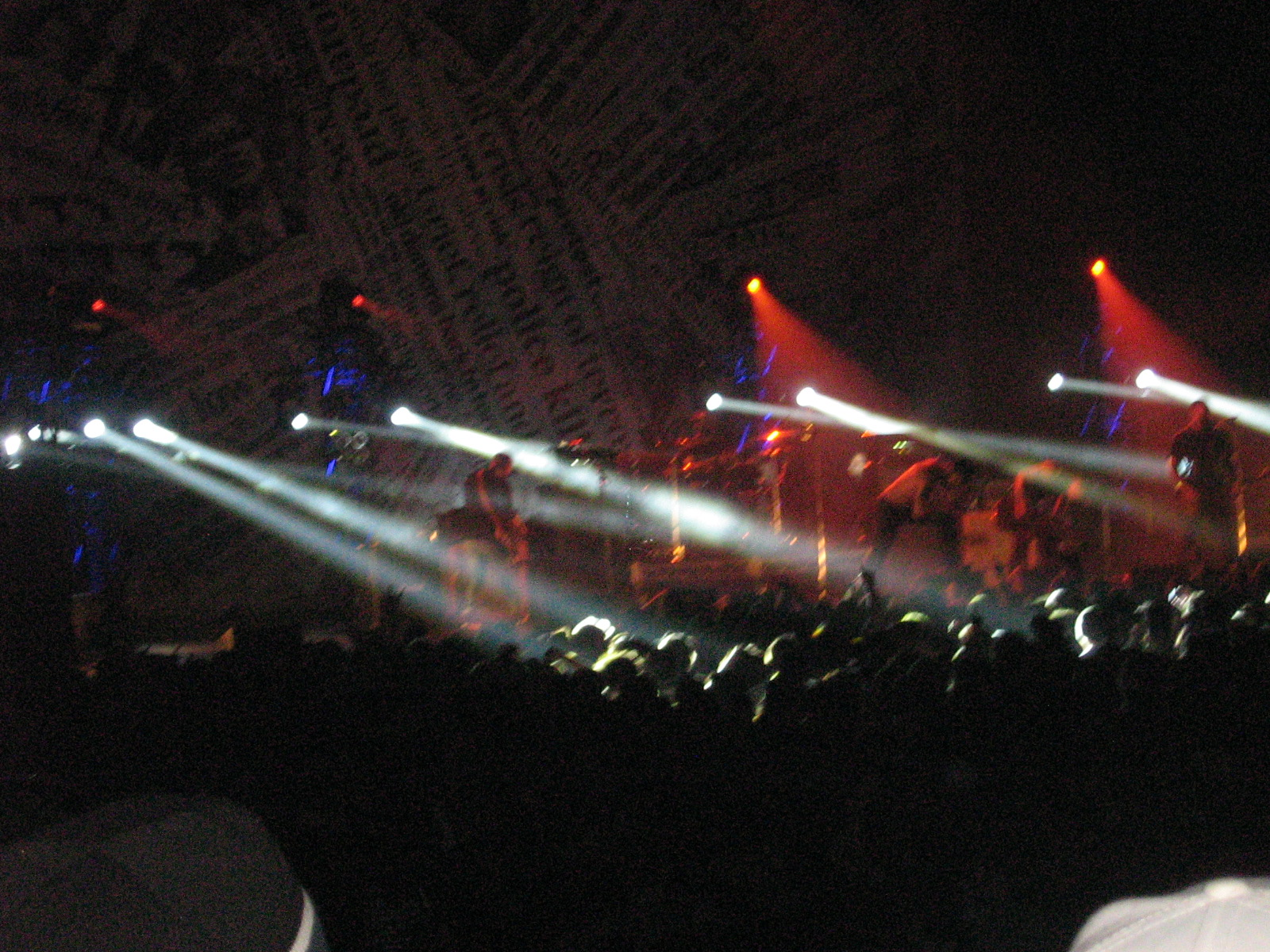
Alexisonfire performing in Vancouver on their 2012 farewell tour.

In 2005, Dallas Green had launched a solo folk/rock side project called City and Colour. The project had become very successful and between that and his commitments to Alexisonfire, he said that he suffered a nervous breakdown and that being in Alexisonfire was killing him. At the end of the Old Crows/Young Cardinals tour, Green told the band that he was leaving Alexisonfire, but that he would not announce his departure until the rest of the band decided on their future plans.

On February 14, 2011, Alexisonfire tweeted that they had been writing new music for their fifth studio album, describing it as "so heavy it's going to make Dog's Blood look like a ska record". Despite these statements, the album did not materialize and on August 5, 2011, Alexisonfire announced their break-up. In the statement, George Pettit cited the departures of both Green and MacNeil (who left to become the vocalist for Gallows), and personal issues among the remaining members as reasons for breaking up. Pettit also described the break-up as not being "amicable". Alexisonfire planned on celebrating their tenth anniversary with one last headlining Canadian tour and "a series of releases", although Green had specifically said that, for him, their December 19, 2010, show in their hometown was their last concert.

In July 2012, Green stated he had been in contact with other members, and that he and MacNeil had been "starting to talk about doing some final [Alexisonfire] shows, because when we did play our last show nobody knew it was our last show." In December 2012, Alexisonfire embarked on their farewell tour. It was initially nine dates, but it expanded to 30, with stops in Canada, the UK, Australia and Brazil. In December, the EP Death Letter was released, featuring new interpretations of songs spanning the band's previous four albums.

On December 25, 2013, the band released a limited-edition vinyl box set containing all the four albums as well as EPs, LPs, B-sides etc. One thousand copies were produced; they were sold out in 30 minutes. In August 2014, they released a slightly smaller second edition of the boxed set.

=== Reunion, Otherness and Bleed It (2015–present) ===
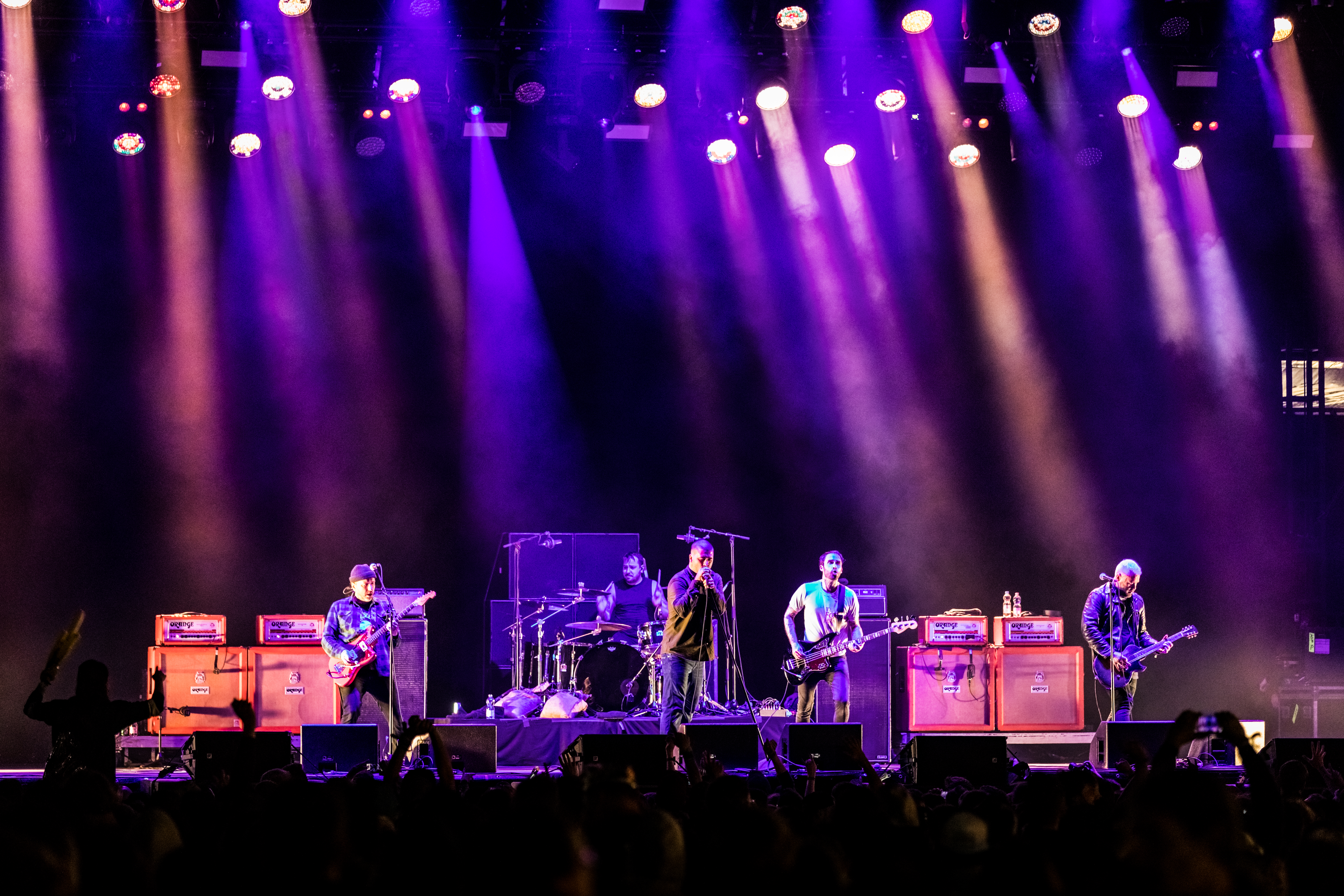
Alexisonfire live at Rock am Ring 2018

On March 9, 2015, the band announced a reunion tour, their first since their farewell tour in 2012, including dates at Reading and Leeds festivals, Sonic Boom, Heavy Montréal, X-Fest and Riot Fest. On September 19, 2015, at Riot Fest in Toronto, Wade MacNeil announced on stage that the band was officially back. The band later clarified this statement, reaffirming they had "no immediate plans" regarding new music or tours together, however they've played 100 concerts since 2015.

On February 12, 2016, the band released Live at Copps, a recording of their performance on December 30, 2012, at the Copps Coliseum in Hamilton, Ontario, which was the last show of their 2012 farewell tour. The album was released for download through iTunes, as well as in a special 4-record set, and as a Blu-ray video.

On June 22, 2016, Alexisonfire was announced as the main headliner for the 2017 Unify Gathering in Victoria, Australia, and announced a tour with The Dirty Nil, Behind Crimson Eyes and The Getaway Plan through Australia and New Zealand. The band was then announced as a headliner at the annual Quebec festival Montebello Rock and, on February 27, 2017, the band made a surprise three-song appearance at the Toronto stop of Billy Talent's Afraid of Heights Tour. They played Toronto's Danforth Music Hall in December 2017, and spent the following June touring Germany and the UK before heading back to Canada to play the Festival d'été de Québec.

On February 1, 2019, the band posted a black image on their Facebook page. Later in the day, the band posted a teaser video featuring a building with a green neon light spelling out the words "Familiar Drugs". Later, on February 12, 2019, the band posted 3 illusive black pictures on their Instagram page. Fans soon figured out that by changing the brightness and contrast on these black pictures, it revealed the numbers 2,15 and 19. On February 15, 2019, the band released a new song called "Familiar Drugs", their first new material in nearly nine years. On April 16, 2019, the band released the music video for "Familiar Drugs," which was shot completely on VHS and cellphones.

On May 24, 2019, the band released another standalone single called "Complicit", followed by "Season of the Flood", on January 13, 2020.

Alexisonfire went out on a short tour in 2019, playing shows in London, New York City, Los Angeles and Toronto as well as a show at Ottawa Bluesfest. This was followed by 2020 performances in Winnipeg, Edmonton, Calgary, Vancouver and Seattle.

During the COVID-19 pandemic, the band hosted a special one-time watch party on YouTube, showing a filmed performance of the final show on their farewell tour in December 2012 in Hamilton, Ontario, Canada. Starting before the livestream was the premiere of their music video for their song, "Season of the Flood", which is made up of footage shot exclusively by AOF concertgoers in Winnipeg, Edmonton, Calgary and Vancouver during the tour in January.

In an interview with the Toronto Star in 2019, George Pettit revealed that, in 2015, he had become a professional firefighter and that, even though the band had reunited, that new career would be his priority. He also remains the lead singer in his side project, Dead Tired. Wade MacNeil continues as the lead singer for Black Lungs and Gallows. On May 21, 2021, MacNeil presented his latest project, Doom's Children with his first single and video, "Flower Moon". Jordan Hastings continues with his long-time side project, Cunter. Dallas Green has continued on with City and Colour, and with You+Me, his collaboration with Pink.

In a June 2021 interview, Green stated that Alexisonfire was "trying to get all these new songs together for the first time in like ten years" implying that more new music was in the works. On March 10, 2022, the band announced their fifth studio album Otherness, their first album of new studio recordings in thirteen years. It was released on June 24, 2022. The album won the Juno Award for Rock Album of the Year at the Juno Awards of 2023. They toured with Avenged Sevenfold in 2023. The band opened for Blink-182 in Toronto on August 15, 2024.

In October 2025, the band announced a covers EP, called Copies of Old Masters, Vol. 1, to be released via Dine Alone Records on November 7. The band also released their cover of The Tragically Hip song "Fully Completely", on the same day, from the EP. In February 2026 the band began recording a new album, and were confirmed to be on the roster for the Louder Than Life festival taking place in Louisville in September. At a show celebrating the 20th anniversary of Crisis at the RBC Amphitheatre, the band announced that they had completed the album, debuting the song “Dogs of Chernobyl” from the new album.

On November 10, 2026, the band posted a video on their social media channels teasing a release called Bleed It. In a post from November 12, it was confirmed to be their new album set for release on March 19, 2027. Another post from November 12 debuted the official music video for the single "Push the River", which was released on their YouTube channel.

== Musical style and legacy ==
The band describes their music as "the sound of two Catholic high-school girls in mid-knife-fight"; in 2004, then-drummer Jesse Ingelevics described their sound as "Mogwai meets Sunny Day Real Estate". Others have described their music as pop screamo, post-hardcore, emo, melodic hardcore, and screamo. The band members originally bonded over the myriad punk rock styles that their hometown scene consisted of, including moshcore, screamo, youth crew, crust punk and emo. In a 2022 interview with Exclaim!, MacNeil explained that originally, the screamo scene was "the community we wanted to be part of". However, as the 2000s progressed the band felt that screamo "became a dirty word". At this time Pettit stated in an interview that "I don't want to be the band that saves [screamo], I want to be the band that kills it."

Their music employs three main vocalists: one clean (Green), one unclean (Pettit) and one serving as a combination of the two (MacNeil). Their 2009 album Old Crows / Young Cardinals saw a more prominent overall use of clean vocals, with Pettit also providing further clean vocals, having occasionally done so on Crisis. The band's first two albums include occasional spoken word vocals, also performed by Pettit.

The band have cited influences including Saetia, Refused, Fucked Up, Moneen, Quicksand, Planes Mistaken for Stars, Misfits, Tears for Fears, Hot Water Music, Elliott, the Appleseed Cast, Iggy Pop, Nick Cave, Rocket From the Crypt, Hot Snakes, Taken, Alice in Chains, Jeff Buckley, Leonard Cohen and Slint.

Alexisonfire has been cited as an influence by bands such as Cancer Bats, Silverstein, Four Year Strong and 36 Crazyfists. The name of Canadian hardcore band Counterparts was chosen in reference to their song "Counterparts and Number Them". Revolver Magazine additionally cited them as influencing the majority of the mid-2000s post-hardcore scene. Liam Cormier, lead vocalist of Cancer Bats, stated "everyone will always remember Alexisonfire and Billy Talent as the two bands that brought heavy music to the forefront and broke that scene wide open in this country." The band has also been well-regarded for their live performances throughout the years. Ex-frontman of Grade, Kyle Bishop, credited them for this in an interview with The Grid TO. "Previous to them, Canadian content was pretty lame, palatable stuff," he said. "Then you had Alexis come in, George shredding his larynx and smashing his face against the wall. They destroyed everything. And a lot of people gravitated to that, and I've never seen that happen in Canada before. They opened up the door for a lot of bands to be appreciated, and brought a whole new group of people into punk rock." In an article for Exclaim!, Ian Gormely praised the band for "opening doors for like-minded artists steeped in Southern Ontario's potent punk and metal scenes," and as having an "enduring influence in Canadian rock, and aggressive music in general".

== Band members ==
Current

- Dallas Green – vocals, guitar (2001–2011, 2012, 2015–present), keyboards (2005–2009)
- Wade MacNeil – guitar, vocals (2001–2011, 2012, 2015–present)
- George Pettit – vocals (2001–2011, 2012, 2015–present), keyboards (2009–2011)
- Chris Steele – bass (2001–2011, 2012, 2015–present)
- Jordan Hastings – drums, percussion (2005–2011, 2012, 2015–present)

Former

- Jesse Ingelevics – drums, percussion (2001–2005)

Touring

- Kenny Bridges – bass (2008)
- Matt Kelly – keyboards, pedal steel (2022–present)

Timeline

== Discography ==
Studio albums

- Alexisonfire (2002)
- Watch Out! (2004)
- Crisis (2006)
- Old Crows / Young Cardinals (2009)
- Otherness (2022)
- Bleed It (2027)

== Awards and nominations ==
Year	Event	Won	Nominated
2004	Canadian Independent Music Awards	Best Video ("Pulmonary Archery")	
2004	CASBY Awards	NXNE Favourite Indie Band	
2004	MuchMusic Video Awards	VideoFACT ("Counterparts and Number Them")	Best Independent Video ("Counterparts and Number Them")
2005	Juno Awards	New Group of the Year	
2005	MuchMusic Video Awards	Best Independent Video ("Accidents")	Peoples' Choice Award – Favourite Canadian Group, MuchLOUD Best Rock Video ("Accidents")
2005	SPIN.com Band of the Year		Band of the Year in the "All-Ages" category
2006	CASBY Awards	Favorite New Indie Release (Crisis)	
2007	Juno Awards		Group of the Year
2007	MuchMusic Video Awards	Best Cinematography ("This Could Be Anywhere in the World")	Peoples' Choice Award – Favourite Canadian Group, MuchLOUD Best Rock Video ("This Could Be Anywhere in the World")
2009	XM Verge Awards		Artist of the Year, Album of the Year ("Old Crows/Young Cardinals")
2023	Juno Awards	Rock Album of the Year (Otherness)	
