= Distort Entertainment =

- Founded: 2002
- Founder: Greg Below
- Distributor(s): Fontana North
- Genre: Hardcore punk, metalcore, alternative rock, progressive rock
- Country of origin: Canada
- Location: Toronto, Ontario
- Official website: www.teamdistort.com

Distort Entertainment is a Canadian independent record label based in Toronto, Ontario. The label specializes in bands performing hardcore punk-derived music, including Alexisonfire, Cancer Bats and Johnny Truant, but its sister division Distort Light has also released less aggressive rock bands such as Bend Sinister.

== History ==
Formed by Greg Below, (concert promoter and owner of Distort Productions) and Mitch Joel, (music journalist and publicist) in early 2002, Distort began by producing New Jersey's Step Kings' third release, 3 The Hard Way. The label's slogan "Listen Harder" was soon formed and showed Distort's specialization in heavy music.

In 2002, Below's full-time employment as a studio manager with EMI publishing Canada later helped to jump start Distort by opening the door to a distribution partnership with EMI Music Canada. Although Distort is admired for its independence in the industry, it wanted to be associated with the well respected quality for which EMI had become known.

Now quite established, Distort Entertainment is a well-known Canadian label, and back some of the most respected bands in the heavy music industry.

== Artists/bands represented ==
- A Textbook Tragedy
- Alexisonfire
- Architects
- A Sight For Sewn Eyes
- Blackstorm
- Bend Sinister
- The Bled
- Bleeding Through
- The Bronx
- Bury Tomorrow - Canadian Distribution
- Cancer Bats
- Cavorts
- Comeback Kid
- Dead and Divine
- Damn 13
- Exalt
- The End
- The Gorgeous
- Johnny Truant
- Lower Than Atlantis
- Mandroid Echostar
- Northlane
- Oceana
- Periphery
- Savannah
- Shaped by Fate
- Sights And Sounds
- Sleep When You're Dead
- Straight Reads The Line

== See also ==
- List of record labels
