= George Pettit =

Canadian musician (born 1982)

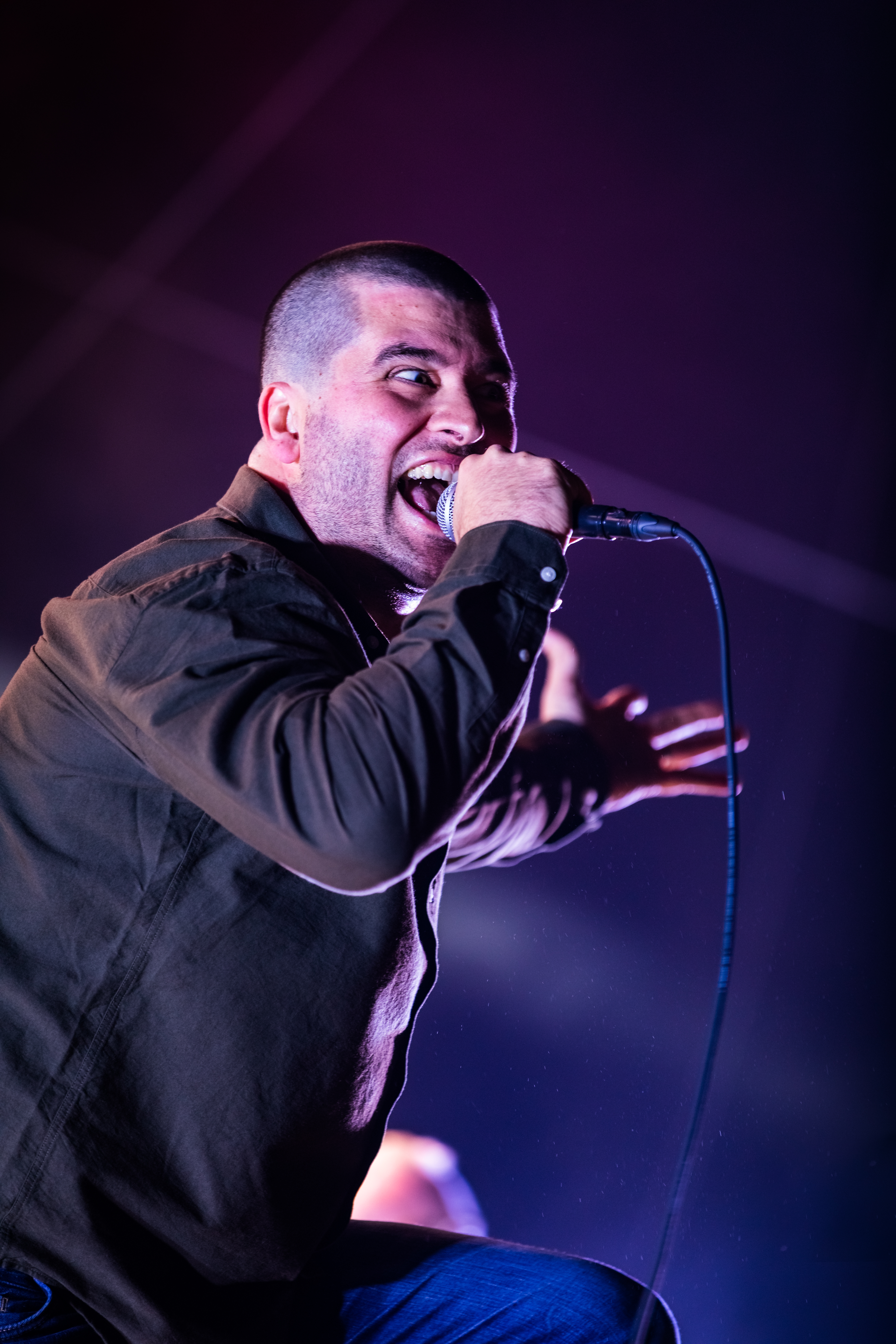
- Pettit performing live in 2018

Background information
- Born: George Frederick Douglas Pettit; October 2, 1982 (age 43); Grimsby, Ontario, Canada
- Genres: Post-hardcore; punk rock; hardcore punk; melodic hardcore; heavy metal
- Occupations: Singer; musician; songwriter; DJ; firefighter
- Instruments: Vocals, bass, guitar, organ
- Years active: 2001–present
- Labels: Distort; Dine Alone

George Frederick Douglas Pettit (born October 2, 1982) is a Canadian musician best known as the lead vocalist of the post-hardcore band Alexisonfire. He is also currently active as the vocalist of Dead Tired.

== Biography ==
Pettit grew up in Grimsby, Ontario. He attended Lakeview Public School for his elementary years, then Grimsby Secondary School where he became involved in the local music scene.

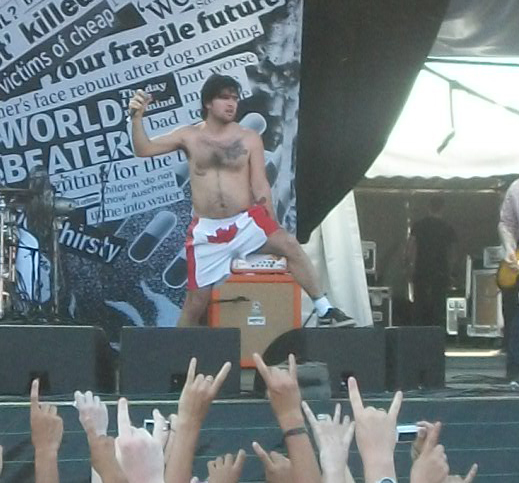
Pettit in 2010

At the age of 17 Pettit, joined by friends Dallas Green, Wade MacNeil, Chris Steele, and Jesse Ingelevics formed Alexisonfire. According to Pettit, he had a choice of going to art school or being in the band before the first tour. Pettit ultimately chose Alexisonfire which would later gain worldwide recognition.

In January 2009, he married his long-time girlfriend, Megan. Their first child, Owen Edward Pettit, was born on the winter solstice, December 21, 2009.

Pettit is an avid record collector as well as a DJ, taking tips from the great DJ King Tubby. He is also known for his diverse music taste ranging from Rick James and Nancy Sinatra to the Screamers. Pettit was a juror on the first two episodes of Video On Trial, a television show on MuchMusic, under the alias George Logan. He also hosts Strange Notes, a television program which airs on BiteTV and aux.tv. The show features in-depth interviews conducted by Pettit of artists that he finds interesting.

After the dissolution of Alexisonfire in 2011, Pettit retrained to become a firefighter at Emergency Services Academy in Sherwood Park, Alberta. He rejoined Alexisonfire in 2015.

In 2015, Pettit released an LP with his side project Dead Tired. The band has since released two further EPs.

== Other work ==
Pettit is involved in bandmate Wade MacNeil's side project Black Lungs, for whom he sometimes plays bass on tour.

Pettit also provides lead vocals for his other side project Dead Tired.

Previously, a band called the Bergenfield Four (including Pettit alongside members of Attack in Black and Fucked Up) did their first show in Toronto, Ontario at the El Mocombo, in the fall of 2006. They released a four-song 7" demo in April 2007.

Pettit appears in the Cancer Bats videos for "100 Grand Canyon" and "Pneumonia Hawk" as well as contributing vocals to Pneumonia Hawk. He also appeared with Dallas Green on Jude the Obscure's album, on the song "Wake Up My Love", and as a guest vocalist on "Vivian Girls" by Fucked Up. He later contributed further guest vocals to Fucked Up's album Glass Boys.

George Pettit also featured as Guest Vocalist in the 2011 track "Sworded Beest" by the Hard Rock Band Monster Truck (on the Brown EP), hailing from Hamilton, Ontario.

Pettit also makes a cameo in the music video for "Surprise Surprise" by Billy Talent.
