= Wade MacNeil =

Canadian musician (born 1984)

Wade Gordon MacNeil
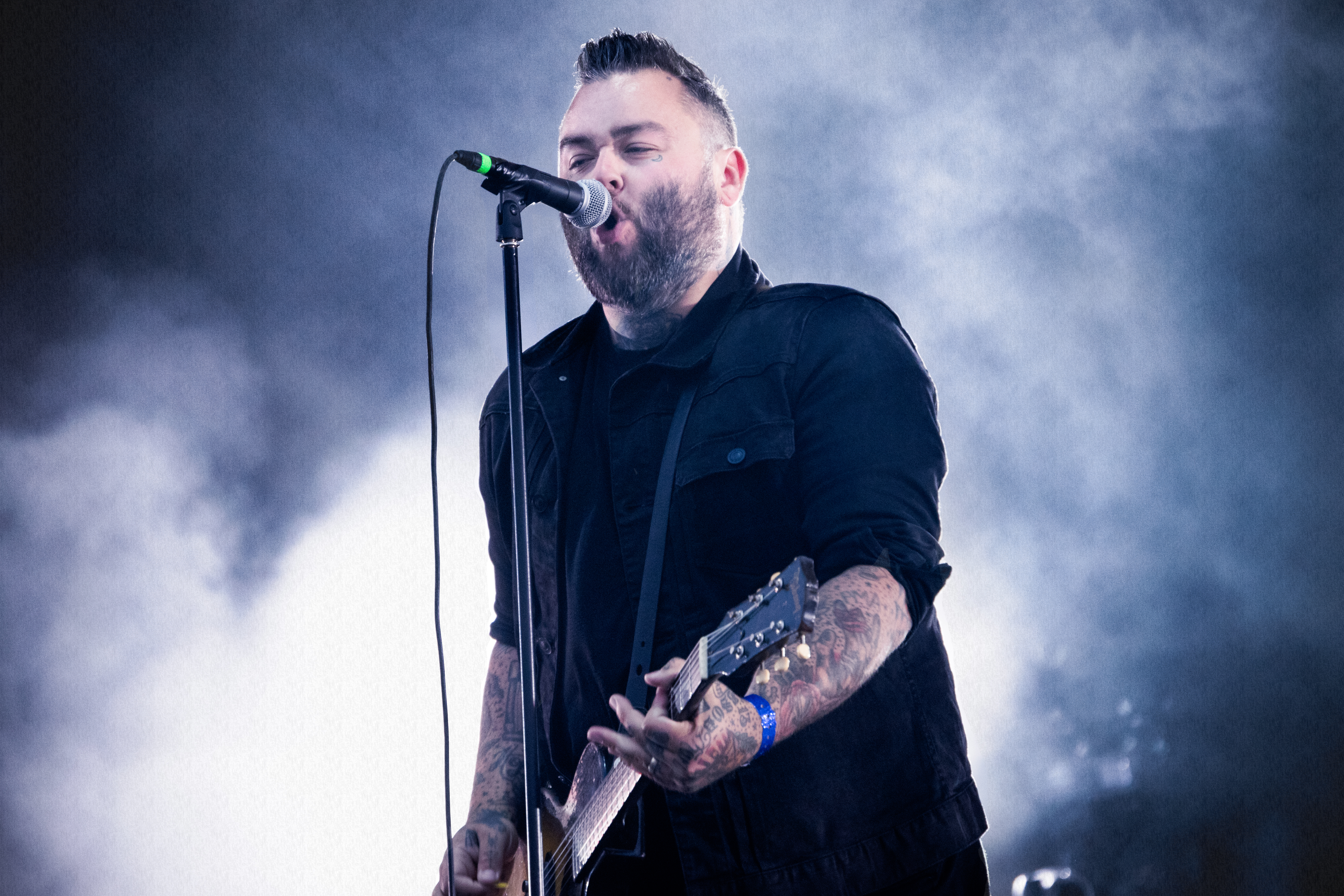
- MacNeil performing with Alexisonfire in 2015

Background information
- Born: Wade Gordon MacNeil; May 5, 1984 (age 42); Hamilton, Ontario, Canada
- Genres: Post-hardcore, punk rock, hardcore punk, alternative rock, folk punk, goth rock
- Occupations: Musician, guitarist, singer, songwriter, radio DJ, composer
- Instruments: Vocals, guitar, bass
- Years active: 2001–present
- Labels: Distort Entertainment, Dine Alone
- Member of: Alexisonfire, Pig Pen, Dooms Children
- Formerly of: After the Hallowed Moment, Plan 9, Gallows, Black Lungs

Wade Gordon MacNeil (born May 5, 1984) is a Canadian musician, songwriter, composer, and former radio personality. He is best known as one of the guitarists and vocalists of the post-hardcore band Alexisonfire. He has also provided guitars and/or vocals to various other bands, including Gallows, Black Lungs, Pig Pen, and his solo project Dooms Children.

MacNeil has featured as a guest vocalist for songs by various other artists, including "St. Andrews" by Bedouin Soundclash, "Deathsmarch" by Cancer Bats (also appearing in the song's video), "Widower" by Johnny Truant, "The Gre(A)t Depression" by Anti-Flag and "She Upon the Black Wolf" by The Banner.

MacNeil was also the weekend afternoon announcer on CFNY-FM (102.1 the Edge) Toronto from November 2014 to August 2018, and made an appearance as a radio host in the 2020 movie Random Acts of Violence.

In 2025, MacNeil performed as the touring guitarist in Thursday.

== Music career ==
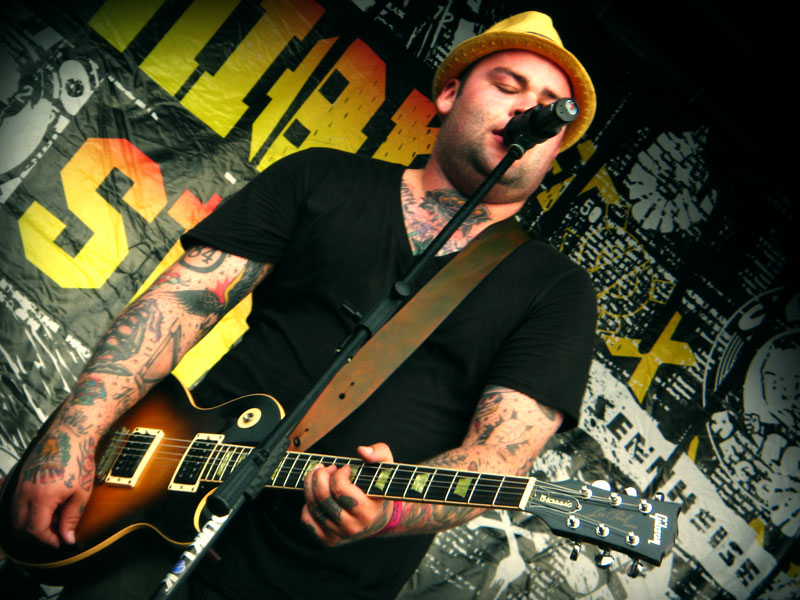
MacNeil in 2008 with Black Lungs

=== With Alexisonfire ===
MacNeil co-founded Alexisonfire in fall 2001 after being phoned by Dallas Green, who asked for MacNeil's assistance in getting Green's band at the time, Helicon Blue, some shows in the area. MacNeil, having just left the band After the Hallowed Moment, had been jamming with drummer Jesse Ingelevics, and asked Green if he wanted to start a band with him. Green accepted, and the three jammed together, with both MacNeil and Green on guitar and vocals, which was later cited as the first Alexisonfire practice together. Chris Steele, who was an active member alongside MacNeil in the bands Plan 9 and After the Hallowed Moment, assumed the role of bass player. MacNeil recruited George Pettit, after having seen him perform as the bassist in the metal band Condemning Salem, a band which Pettit expressed great discontent in playing in.

=== With Gallows ===
Frank Carter, the original vocalist of UK hardcore band Gallows, announced in early July 2011 that he would be leaving Gallows because of differing opinions in writing the band's follow-up album to their second release Grey Britain. His departure was effective from August 1, after the band's final tour dates. Just eight days after Frank's departure, on August 9, 2011, MacNeil was confirmed as the new Gallows vocalist. MacNeil has stated that the members of Gallows asked him initially out of coincidence that Alexisonfire had disbanded and Gallows needed a new singer. The band completed a debut release with Wade, Death Is Birth, a four track extended play which was released on December 13 that year. The EP was sold as a 7" vinyl record. A music video for "True Colours" was released, and "Mondo Chaos" was released in a single format. Gallows have announced the release date of their eponymous third album to be September 10, 2012. The album was produced, mixed and mastered by Spycatcher members Thomas Mitchener and Steve Sears at Watford's Broadfields Studio and will be released via the band's new label Venn Records in partnership with PIAS Recordings. The album will also be released and distributed in the United States through Bridge Nine Records. It is the first Gallows full-length to feature MacNeil on lead vocals and the second official release overall after 2011's Death Is Birth EP.

=== With Dooms Children ===
In May 2021, MacNeil teased his new psychedelic rock project Dooms Children. The first single titled "Flower Moon" was first heard on Daniel P Carter's BBC radio 1 show, aired on May 23.

During an interview with Wall of Sound, MacNeil spoke about his duties in Dooms Children, stating "I've always considered myself a songwriter and a singer but just maybe in the projects that I've been involved in the most, that's not what anybody else thinks."

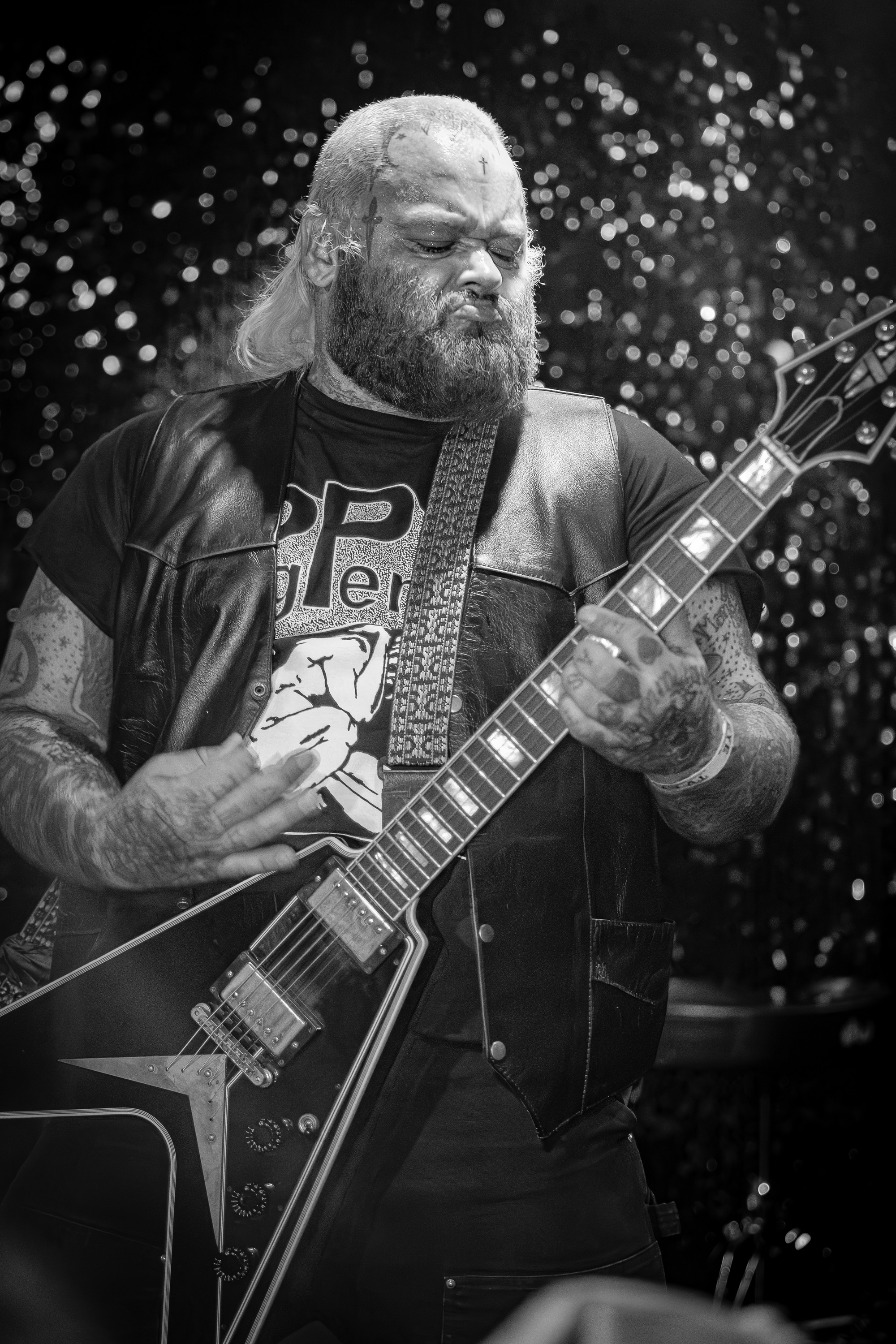
Wade MacNeil performing with Pig Pen at TV Eye in Brooklyn on July 5th 2025

=== With Pig Pen ===
In early 2025, MacNeil announced the formation of his new band Pig Pen, featuring vocalist Matty Matheson, guitarist Daniel Romano, drummer Ian Romano, and bassist Tommy Major. The group made their live debut on April 25 at Sneaky Dee's in Toronto.

In an interview discussing Pig Pen, MacNeil described the band's dynamic as "a natural creative outlet," emphasizing their collective desire to explore musical avenues different from their previous projects.

=== In film ===
MacNeil is credited as a composer for Goon: Last of the Enforcers. After attending a Montreal Canadiens game with Jay Baruchel, MacNeil created songs for the film, that he describes as "to be all things that sound like you could turn up to 10 in an arena."

In 2018, he partnered with Andrew Gordon Macpherson to create the score for the film The Ranger.

=== In video games ===
MacNeil again partnered with Andrew Gordon Macpherson in 2018 to create the soundtrack to Far Cry 5's arcade mode.

== Equipment ==
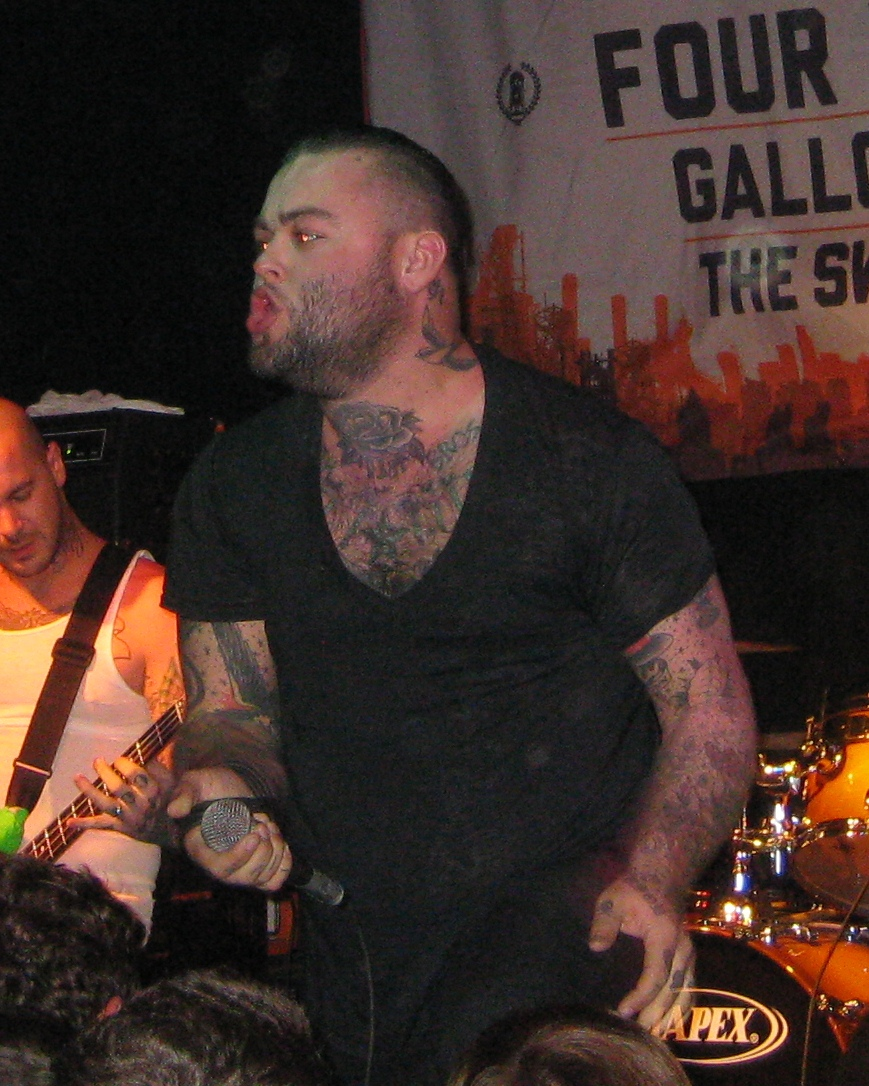
MacNeil in 2011 with Gallows.

- Gibson Les Paul Junior
- Gibson Les Paul Custom (Silverburst)
- Morris Amps (unknown model)
- Orange RockerVerb 100
- Marshall JCM2000 TSL100 head
- HiWatt (Warped Tour)
- Orange 4x12 cabinet
- Gibson Marauder in Vintage Green
- Gibson SG Standard in TobaccoBurst
- Gibson Les Paul Standard in Heritage Cherry (with open coil humbuckers)
- Schecter Corsair 6 TobaccoBurst
- Schecter S-1 Antique Ivory
- Gibson ES-335s (Various colours)
- Epiphone Sheraton (as seen in the video for Young Cardinals)
- Fender Jazzmaster (as seen in Alexisonfire's Reading 2015 set)
- Gibson Custom Flying V
