= Tokyo Police Club discography =

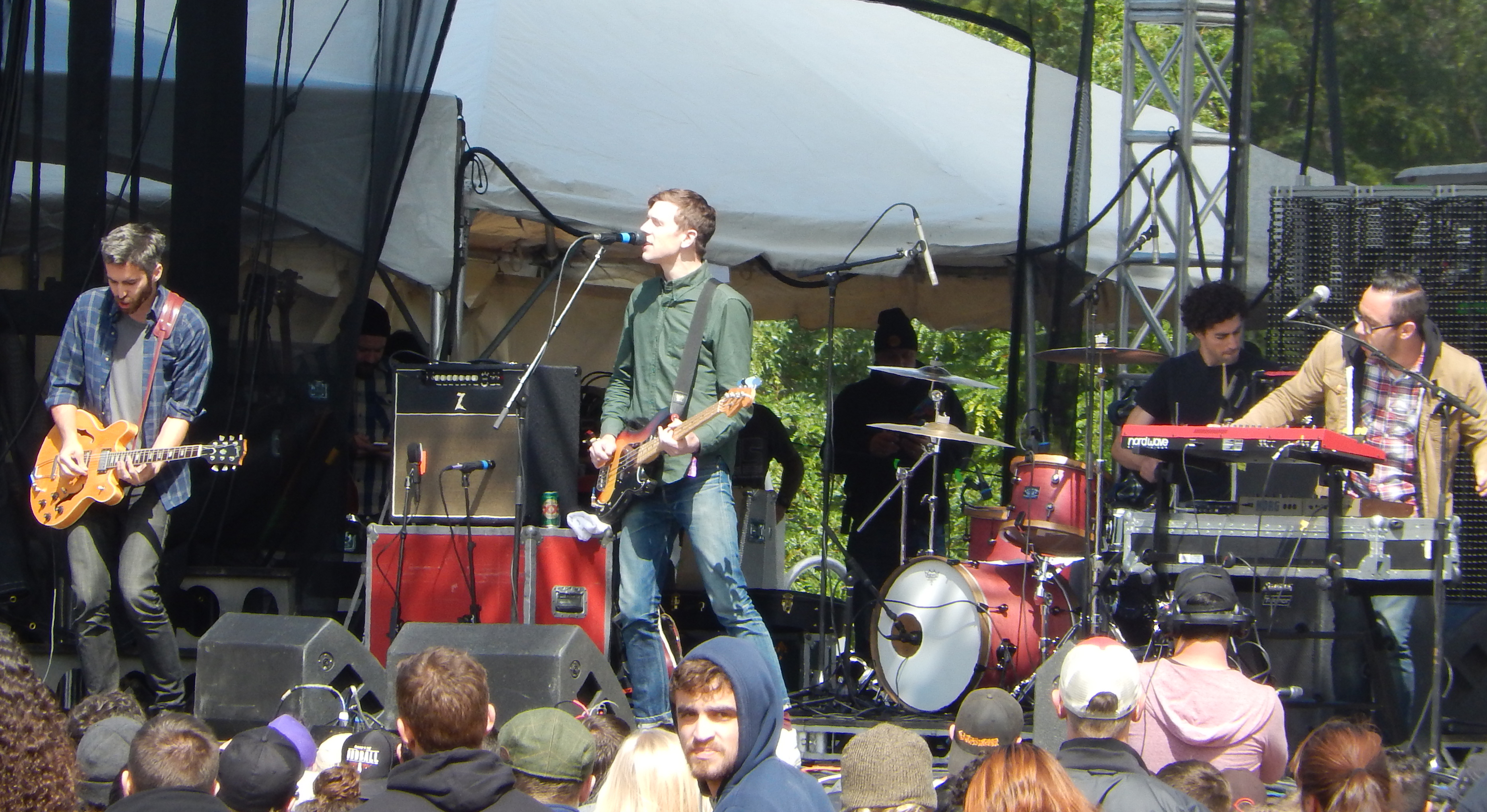
- The band in 2014
- Studio albums: 6
- Extended plays: 4
- Live albums: 2
- Compilation albums: 2
- Singles: 22
- Demo albums: 2
- Remix albums: 2
- Cover albums: 1

The following is the discography of Tokyo Police Club. They regularly released music since their formation in 2005 up until their disbandment in 2024. In addition to their five studio albums, they had put out a number of other original releases as well as reissues, demo albums, and live albums.

== Albums ==
=== Studio albums ===
List of studio albums, with selected chart positions
Title	Album details	Peak chart positions					
Title	Album details	CAN	UK	UK Indie.	US	US Rock	US Indie
Elephant Shell	Released: April 22, 2008; Label: Saddle Creek (North America), Memphis (Europe); Format: LP, CD, digital	10	128	10	106	—	17
Champ	Released: June 8, 2010; Label: Mom + Pop (US), Dine Alone (Canada), Memphis (Europe); Format: LP, CD, cassette, digital; 10th Anniversary Edition released 2021	19	186	19	59	17	6
Forcefield	Released: March 25, 2014; Label: Mom + Pop (US), Dine Alone (Canada), Memphis (Europe); Format: LP, CD, cassette, digital	17	— (Note: "Forcefield" did not enter the UK Albums Chart, but peaked at number 17 on the UK Record Store Chart.)	37	120	29	25
TPC	Released: October 5, 2018; Label: Dine Alone; Format: LP, CD, digital	—	—	—	—	—	—
"—" denotes a recording that did not chart or was not released in that territory.

=== Compilation albums ===
Title	Album details
A Lesson in Crime / Smith EP	Released: September 25, 2016; Label: Paper Bag; Format: LP
Melon Collie and the Infinite Radness: Parts One & Two	Released: September 26, 2016; Label: Dine Alone; Format: LP, digital

=== Cover albums ===
- Ten Songs, Ten Years, Ten Days (Dine Alone, 2011)

=== Live albums ===
- Live from Soho EP (Paper Bag, 2007)
- Eight Songs Live (Dine Alone, 2018)

=== Remix albums ===
- Tokyo Police Club Remixes (Memphis, 2007) (A Lesson in Crime remixes)
- Elephant Shell Remixes (Saddle Creek, 2008)

=== Demo albums ===
- Tokyo Police Club (self-released, 2005) (A Lesson in Crime/Smith EP demos)
- Church Demos (self-released, 2020) (TPC demos)

=== Reissues ===
- A Lesson in Crime 10th Anniversary Edition (Paper Bag, 2016)
- Champ 10th Anniversary Edition (Mom + Pop, 2021)

== EPs ==
List of EPs, with selected chart positions
Title	EP details	Peak chart positions		
Title	EP details	CAN	UK	UK Indie.
A Lesson in Crime	Released: April 25, 2006; Label: Paper Bag, Memphis (Europe); Format: 12", CD, digital; 10th Anniversary Edition released 2016	160	139	4
Smith EP	Released: October 30, 2007; Label: Paper Bag; Format: CD, digital	—	—	—
Melon Collie and the Infinite Radness: Part One	Released: February 19, 2016; Label: Dine Alone; Format: CD, digital	—	—	—
Melon Collie and the Infinite Radness: Part Two	Released: September 23, 2016; Label: Dine Alone; Format: CD, digital	—	—	—
TPC DLX	Released: October 27, 2020; Label: Dine Alone; Format: 12", digital; Companion EP of TPC	—	—	—
"—" denotes a recording that did not chart or was not released in that territory.

== Singles ==
=== As lead artist ===
Title	Year	Peak chart positions								Album
Title	Year	CAN	CAN Rock	AUS Hit.	BEL (FL)	BEL (WA)	SCO	UK Sales	UK Indie.	Album
"Nature of the Experiment"	2006	—	32	—	—	—	—	—	19	A Lesson in Crime
"Cheer It On"	2007	—	—	—	—	—	75	49	4	A Lesson in Crime
"Citizens of Tomorrow"	2007	—	—	—	—	—	—	—	—	A Lesson in Crime
"Your English Is Good"	2007	—	39	—	—	—	—	61	10	Elephant Shell
"Tessellate"	2008	63	29	—	—	—	93	82	17	Elephant Shell
"In a Cave"	2008	—	—	—	—	—	—	—	25	Elephant Shell
"Graves"	2008	—	—	—	—	—	—	—	—	Elephant Shell
"The Baskervilles (Amp Live Remix)" (feat. Aesop Rock & Yak Ballz)	2009	—	—	—	—	—	—	—	—	Non-album single
"Breakneck Speed"	2010	—	—	—	—	—	—	—	—	Champ
"Wait Up (Boots of Danger)"	2010	— (Note: "Wait Up (Boots of Danger)" did not enter the Billboard Canadian Hot 100, but peaked at number 16 on the Canada Emerging Artists chart.)	34	—	—	—	—	—	—	Champ
"Bambi"	2010	— (Note: "Bambi" did not enter the Billboard Canadian Hot 100, but peaked at number 23 on the Canada Emerging Artists chart.)	30	14	—	89	—	—	—	Champ
"Favourite Colour"	2011	—	32	—	—	—	—	—		Champ
"Happy Valentine's Day"	2014	—	—	—	—	—	—	—	—	Non-album single
“Argentina (Parts I, II, III)”	2014	—	—	—	—	—	—	—	—	Forcefield
"Hot Tonight"	2014	— (Note: "Hot Tonight" did not enter the Billboard Canadian Hot 100, but peaked at number 27 on the Canada Emerging Artists chart.)	17	—	137	—	—	—	—	Forcefield
"Tunnel Vision"	2014	—	20	—	—	—	—	—	—	Forcefield
"Gonna Be Ready"	2015	—	36	—	—	—	—	—	—	Forcefield
"Not My Girl"	2016	—	17	—	—	—	—	—	—	Melon Collie and the Infinite Radness Pt 1
"My House"	2016	—	24	—	—	—	—	—	—	Melon Collie and the Infinite Radness Pt 2
"New Blues"	2018	—	—	—	—	—	—	—	—	TPC
"Hercules"	2018	—	24	—	—	—	—	—	—	TPC
"DLTFWYH"	2018	—	—	—	—	—	—	—	—	TPC
"Simple Dude"	2018	—	30	—	—	—	—	—	—	TPC
"Hundred Dollar Day"	2020	—	—	—	—	—	—	—	—	Champ (10th Anniversary Edition)
"Gone (Matt and Kim Remix)"	2021	—	—	—	—	—	—	—	—	Champ (10th Anniversary Edition)
"Just a Scratch" / "Catch Me If You Can"	2024	—	33	—	—	—	—	—	—	Non-album single
"—" denotes a recording that did not chart or was not released in that territory.

=== As featured artist ===
Title	Year	Album
"Our Love" (Avenue feat. Tokyo Police Club)	2015	Non-album single

== Guest appearances ==
Title	Year	Other artist(s)	Album
"Friends of P" (The Rentals cover)	2008	—N/a	Friends of P - Tribute to The Rentals
"Nature of the Experiment (RAC Mix)"	2008	RAC	RAC VOL 1
"(Set List Title: Cableguy) (Remix)"	2011	The Philstines Jr.	If a Lot of Bands Play in the Woods
"Come Come (Tokyo Police Club Remix)"	2012	Hot as Sun	Hot as Sun
"Wait Up (RAC Mix)"	2012	RAC	Chapter One
"My Body (Tokyo Police Club Remix)"	2013	Young the Giant	Remix EP
"Closer (Tokyo Police Club Remix)"	2014	Rush Midnight	Rush Midnight
"Tourist"	2014	RAC	Strangers
"Our Love"	2015	Avenue	—N/a
"Paris (Tokyo Police Club Remix)"	2016	Magic Man	Before the Waves: Remixes
"Since U Been Gone" (cover)	2018	—N/a	10 Years of Mom+Pop

== Solo releases ==
In November 2008, Tokyo Police Club keyboardist Graham Wright released a solo EP called The Lakes of Alberta online only, available as a free download. He has also participated in a project called "Novels" with musicians Luke Lalonde (of Born Ruffians), Will Currie (of Will Currie & The Country French), Dean Marino (of Papermaps), and Jay Sadlowski (of Jay Sad) in which these musicians wrote and recorded an entire EP in 24 hours. The CDs were not released in stores, nor on the internet, but were given out to random people or placed in random places. His debut solo album, Shirts vs Skins, was released on June 27, 2010. Greg Alsop has posted comedy sketch videos online, Drumsters and Novelty T-shirt College as well as a song titled ' Losing Our Heads' in 2013 for the Versus Valerie Season One soundtrack.

In June 2015, lead singer Dave Monks released his first solo EP on iTunes, Spotify and Google Play called "All Signs Point to Yes", with two singles having been released prior to the release of the album. The album "On a Wave" followed in 2019. As of 2018 Dave Monks is also a member of the Canadian supergroup Anyway Gang, releasing its-self titled album in November 2019. On June 24 2020, Monks released a new EP titled On a Wave Goes Wild.
