= TPC (album) =

Studio album by Tokyo Police Club
- Released: October 5, 2018
- Genre: Indie rock
- Length: 51:21
- Label: Dine Alone
- Producer: Rob Schnapf

Tokyo Police Club chronology
Melon Collie and the Infinite Radness: Part Two (2016)	TPC (2018)

TPC is the fourth and final studio album by Canadian indie rock group Tokyo Police Club, released by Dine Alone Records on October 5, 2018. The album reunites the band with their early, spontaneous style as well as with Champ producer Rob Schnapf. The album was well received by fans and critics and was nominated for the 2019 Juno Award for Alternative Album of the Year. Two companion records were released in 2020: a self-released collection of demos as well as the Dine Alone-released EP TPC DLX.

== Production ==
Following the A Lesson in Crime 10th Anniversary Tour and release of Melon Collie and the Infinite Radness in 2016, the band found themselves at a creative crossroad, furthered by the fact that the band members lived in Canada, New York City, and Los Angeles. Facing what could have been a natural conclusion for the band, frontman Dave Monks convinced the other to record a new album. They wrote and demoed the album in rural Ontario in an abandoned church which has also been used as a studio space by Born Ruffians.

Writing for the album began in 2016, with recording taking place in Los Angeles in January 2018. TPC was produced by collaborator Rob Schnapf, who previously produced Champ and mixed other Tokyo Police Club records.

== Reception ==
Under the Radar rated the album a 7/10, saying that it "may not break any new ground as much as it encapsulates a re-energized formulation of the pointed, off-beat guitar rock they've cultivated since 2008's Elephant Shell." The blogosphere gave the album generally positive reviews.

The album was nominated by the 2019 Juno Awards for Alternative Album of the Year.

== TPC DLX EP ==
In 2020, two years following the original release, Tokyo Police Club released a six-track companion EP titled TPC DLX. The first three tracks are songs recorded during the original TPC sessions a few years prior. The final three tracks are acoustic versions of songs from TPC. Earlier that year, the band had self-released sixteen of their demos from these sessions in an album aptly titled Church Demos.

== Track listing ==
All tracks are written by Greg Alsop, Josh Hook, Dave Monks, and Graham Wright.

Standard edition
No.	Title	Length
1.	"New Blues"	4:20
2.	"Pigs"	4:10
3.	"Hercules"	3:32
4.	"Simple Dude"	3:41
5.	"Unseen"	4:04
6.	"DLTFWYH"	4:45
7.	"Can't Stay Here"	4:35
8.	"Outtatime"	6:20
9.	"Ready to Win"	3:15
10.	"Edgy"	3:30
11.	"One of These Days"	4:02
12.	"Daisy Chain"	4:49
Total length:		51:21

TPC DLX EP
No.	Title	Length
1.	"Rubber Bands"	3:30
2.	"Early Light"	2:50
3.	"My Directrion"	3:20
4.	"Ready to Win - Acoustic"	3:30
5.	"Simple Dude - Acoustic"	3:32
6.	"Can't Stay Here - Acoustic"	4:54
Total length:		21:38

== Personnel ==
Adapted from liner notes.

- Greg Alsop – songwriting, drums; mixing and mastering (TPC DLX)
- Josh Hook – songwriting, electric guitar
- Dave Monks – songwriting, lead vocals, bass guitar, photography
- Graham Wright – songwriting, keyboards, backing vocals, guitar
- Rob Schnapf – producer
- Brian Rosemeyer – engineer
- Tyler Carmen – assistant engineer
- Hawksley Workman – engineer (TPC DLX track: 4)
- Trevor Anderson – engineer (TPC DLX tracks: 5–6)
- Mark Chalecki – mastering
- Chris Sikich – gatefold photography
