= Minimum R&B =

Compilation album by the Dirty Nil
- Released: 28 April 2017
- Genre: Garage punk, alternative rock
- Length: 30:41
- Label: Dine Alone, Fat

The Dirty Nil chronology
Higher Power (2016)	Minimum R&B (2017)	Master Volume (2018)

Minimum R&B is a compilation album by Canadian rock band the Dirty Nil, released on 28 April 2017 through Dine Alone Records and Fat Wreck Chords. It collects material from the band's earlier singles and the EP Smite, along with the previously unreleased track "Caroline".

== Background and composition ==
Prior to releasing their debut album Higher Power in 2016, the Dirty Nil had primarily issued standalone singles and EPs. According to Luke Bentham, the band's 2011 release "Fuckin' Up Young" had originally been conceived as a full-length album before being reduced to a two-song single. Material from this period was later compiled on Minimum R&B.

In interviews, members of the band rejected being categorized strictly as a punk band, instead describing themselves as a "rock and roll band" influenced by classic rock and 1970s punk.

== Critical reception ==
Minimum R&B received positive reviews from critics, many of whom noted the compilation's cohesion despite being assembled from earlier releases.

Writing for The Soundboard, Luke Nuttall described the release as "strong enough on its own to stand as simply a new batch of Dirty Nil tracks", praising its garage punk sound, grunge influences, and concise songwriting.

Writing for New Noise Magazine, John Moore said the compilation demonstrated that the band was "capable of sliding in and out of genres", highlighting tracks ranging from loud anthems to slower-tempo songs.

Jane Howkins of York Calling compared elements of the album's sound to Weezer, grunge, and punk rock, while praising the consistency of the band's early material.

Writing for Razorcake, Kayla Greet praised the band's combination of "hardcore aggression" and an alternative rock sound informed by punk influences.

== Track listing ==
Minimum R&B track listing
No.	Title	Length
1.	"Fucking Up Young"	3:48
2.	"Verona Lung"	3:05
3.	"Little Metal Baby Fist"	2:48
4.	"Hate Is a Stone"	3:00
5.	"Cinnamon"	2:03
6.	"Guided by Vices"	2:29
7.	"Nicotine"	1:44
8.	"Beat"	2:08
9.	"New Flesh"	2:44
10.	"Pale Blue"	1:59
11.	"Caroline"	4:53
Total length:		30:41

== Personnel ==
=== The Dirty Nil ===
- Luke Bentham – vocals, guitar
- Dave Nardi – bass
- Kyle Fisher – drums
