= Dinosaur Bones =

Canadian musical group (2008–2015)

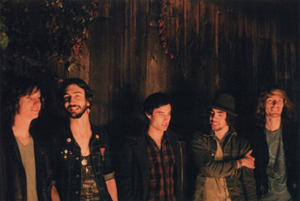
- 2010 press photo

Background information
- Origin: Toronto, Ontario, Canada
- Genre: Indie Rock
- Years active: 2008–2015
- Label: Dine Alone
- Past members: Ben Fox; Branko Scekic; David Wickland; Lucas Fredette; Josh Byrne; Joel Clift
- Website: dinosaurbones.ca

Dinosaur Bones were a Canadian indie rock band formed in 2008 in Toronto consisting of songwriter/vocalist/gutarist Ben Fox, bassist Branko Scekic, keyboardist David Wickland, drummer Lucas Fredette, and guitarist Josh Byrne.

== Biography ==
Dinosaur Bones formed in late 2007 and began performing in early 2008. They recorded and independently released a self-titled EP in May 2008 and began touring locally. The four-song effort was enough to garner two XM Verge Music Award nominations, for Album of the Year and Artist of the Year.

In October 2010, Dinosaur Bones signed an international record deal with Canadian independent record label Dine Alone Records (City & Colour, Tokyo Police Club, Alexisonfire). Their Birthright EP, released a month later, marked the band's first release on Dine Alone Records.

On March 8, 2010, the band released their first full-length album, My Divider. The album was met with consistently-strong reviews, including Montreal's Hour magazine proclaiming: "These 11 tracks are emotional and gripping, and show the band as a tight, whole artistic unit with a signature sound." Both the Birthright EP and My Divider were produced by Jon Drew, whose production credits include Arkells, Tokyo Police Club, and Fucked Up.

== Performance history ==
=== Live performance ===
Dinosaur Bones have shared the stage with such artists as Broken Social Scene, Sloan, White Lies, Warpaint, The Weakerthans, and Handsome Furs, and have toured extensively both in Canada and the United States, including tours supporting Tokyo Police Club, Ra Ra Riot, Arkells, and Hollerado.

Since forming, the band has made multiple appearances at Canadian festivals such as Pop Montreal, North By Northeast, Canadian Music Week, and Halifax Pop Explosion. In 2011, the band was invited to perform on the main stage of both Rifflandia Music Festival in Victoria, British Columbia, and Edgefest in Toronto, Ontario. Dinosaur Bones have also made multiple appearances at American festivals, including CMJ Music Marathon, and South By Southwest in 2010, where the then-unsigned band were invited to play the Billboard Magazine showcase. The band returned to the festival in 2011 in support of My Divider.

=== Television performances ===
Dinosaur Bones have made three television appearances, performing live on Winnipeg's Breakfast Television, Ottawa's A-Channel Morning, as well as appearing for a three-song performance on MTV Live.

== Discography ==
=== Albums ===
Release date	Title	Label
May 2011	My Divider	Dine Alone Records
August 2013	Shaky Dream	Dine Alone Records

=== EPs ===
Release date	Title	Label
May 2008	Dinosaur Bones EP	Self-released
Feb 2009	Royalty/Ice Hotels 7"	Hi-Scores Recording Library
Nov 2010	Birthright EP	Dine Alone Records

=== Singles ===
Year	Song	Chart peak	Album
Year	Song	CAN Alt	Album
2011	"N.Y.E."	43	My Divider
"—" denotes a release that did not chart.
