= Bathed in Light =

Single by The Dirty Nil

from the album Master Volume
- Released: June 20, 2018
- Recorded: 2017
- Genre: Rock
- Length: 2:24
- Label: Dine Alone
- Songwriter(s): Luke Bentham: Ross Miller; Kyle Fisher
- Producer(s): John Goodmanson

The Dirty Nil singles chronology
"No Weaknesses" (2015)	"Bathed in Light" (2018)	"Pain of Infinity" (2018)

Music video
- "Bathed In Light" on YouTube

"Bathed in Light" is a song by Canadian rock band The Dirty Nil. It was their first single off of their second studio album Master Volume.

== Background ==
The song was released as the first single from the band's second studio album, Master Volume. A music video was released on June 20, 2018, featuring the band performing the song with pyrotechnics and fireworks going off near the band members. The band also released an alternate video of them performing the song live in the studio on September 13, 2018.

== Themes and composition ==
Lyrically, the song is a tongue in cheek account of a narrator finding himself dealing with his own death, through falling down stairs or falling asleep while driving, and then embracing that he gets to see his grandmother, Elvis, and Jesus in the afterlife. The lyrics were described as being as if the narrator were giving his own epitaph. The song was inspired by an experience by band frontman Luke Bentham, where he fell asleep in the tour bus and had a dream about crashing and dying a fiery death. The song was developed relatively quickly; the experience left him shook up, so he wrote down scratch lyrics right away upon awakening, and wrote the song's guitar riff at the band's next soundcheck. A guitar solo was also later added to the track. The song's large rock sound was compared to the work of Pup, White Reaper, and Cheap Trick. The song was produced by indie rock music producer John Goodmanson.

== Personnel ==
Band

- Luke Bentham - vocals, guitar
- Ross Miller - bass
- Kyle Fisher - drums
