= Master Volume =

Studio album by The Dirty Nil
- Released: September 14, 2018
- Genres: Punk rock; rock and roll
- Length: 27:08
- Label: Dine Alone
- Producer: John Goodmanson

The Dirty Nil chronology
Minimum R&B (2017)	Master Volume (2018)	Fuck Art (2021)

Singles from Master Volume
- 1. "Bathed In Light" Released: June 7, 2018; 2. "Pain of Infinity" Released: July 11, 2018; 3. "I Don't Want That Phone Call" Released: August 23, 2018; 4. "That's What Heaven Feels Like" Released: October 30, 2018

Master Volume is the second studio album by Canadian punk rock band, The Dirty Nil. The album was released on September 14, 2018 through Dine Alone Records. The album's first single, "Bathed in Light", was released ahead of the album in June 2018.

== Background and recording ==
On June 7, 2018, the band announced their sophomore album. While most of the songs were written on tour during soundchecks or in the tour van, the recording took place in Toronto at Union Sound Company recording studios, with John Goodmanson flown up from Seattle to produce the album.

== Release and promotion ==
=== Singles ===
On June 7, 2018, the band announced their sophomore album and released their first single for the album, "Bathed In Light". Geoff Parent, writing for Dominionated, praised the track calling it "[The Dirty Nil] at their very best." Parent described the composition of the song as "infectious, efficient, and massive", and wrote that the track "burns white-hot before riding headstrong into the black."

On July 11, 2018, the second single ahead of the album, "Pain of Infinity" was released. In a mixed review of the track, Jason Pettigrew, writing for Alternative Press called the band and the track "Too noisy and attitude-laden for music directors at radio and graybeards praying for one more Aerosmith tour, and way too coarse for devotees of sterile Pro Tooled pop punk, the Dirty Nil are the bastard sons emerging from a beer-fueled Petri dish teeming with Seattle grunge and drunken Midwest alt-rock."

"I Don't Want That Phone Call" was the third single to be released by the band, and final single released ahead of the album's release. The single was released on August 23, 2018 exclusively via Kerrang! magazine, and released the following day on Dine Alone Records' SoundCloud account. Lead singer, Luke Bentham, described the song as a love song to anyone struggling with substance abuse.

=== Music videos ===
The first music video, for their single, "Bathed In Light" premiered on YouTube on June 20, 2018. The video was produced by "Parkside" Mike Renaud, directed by Mitch Barnes and Victor Malang. It was filmed at the Shangri-La Niagara Family Campground in St. Catharines, Ontario, Canada. The video features the band performing the song with pyrotechnics and fireworks going off near the band members.

== Track listing ==
No.	Title	Length
1.	"That's What Heaven Feels Like"	2:49
2.	"Bathed In Light"	2:23
3.	"Pain of Infinity"	2:57
4.	"Please, Please Me"	2:03
5.	"Auf Wiedersehen"	3:38
6.	"Always High"	2:44
7.	"Smoking Is Magic"	2:50
8.	"Super 8"	2:32
9.	"I Don't Want That Phone Call"	2:18
10.	"Evil Side"	5:58
11.	"Hit the Lights (Metallica cover)"	3:20
Total length:		27:08

== Critical reception ==
Professional ratings
Aggregate scores
Source	Rating
Metacritic	79/100
Review scores
Source	Rating
Classic Rock	8/10
Exclaim!	9/10
Kerrang!	4/5 stars
NME	3/5 stars
Now	4/5 stars

Master Volume was well-received by contemporary music critics. On review aggregator, Metacritic, Master Volume received an average score of 79 out of 100, indicating "generally favorable reviews". In a rave review, Adam Feibel, writing for Exclaim! described the band in their "purest, loudest and most electrifying form". Feibel described Master Volume as "a defining sermon, distilling decades of guitar-charged power and wisdom into 10 succinct commandments". Feibel would give the album a nine out of 10.

Essi Berelian, writing for Classic Rock called the album, "punk, but not as we know it". Berelian praised the production of the album but also gave high marks to the sense of humor and irony embedded throughout the album. Berelian called Master Volume a "clever [album] with melodies over and above what they achieved on debut Higher Power, and lyrically there's more than welcome cheeky sense of irony". Berelian gave the album a score of eight out of 10. Writing for Now, Luke Ottenhof gave the album four stars out of five. Ottenhof called Master Volume a "delightful", but a "precise record".

In a more mixed review, Jordan Bassett, writing for NME described the album as "experiential music, meant to be enjoyed communally at their ear-splitting live shows". He gave the album three stars out of five.

== Personnel ==
The Dirty Nil

- Luke Bentham – lead vocals, guitar
- Ross Miller – bass, backing vocals
- Kyle Fisher – drums

== Charting ==
Chart (2018)	Peak position
Canadian Albums (Billboard)	23
