= Kid Cadaver =

- Origin: Los Angeles, California, California, United States
- Genres: Neon pop, pop punk, indie rock
- Years active: 2012–present
- Label: Unsigned
- Members: Raymond Venta; Kenzo Cardenas
- Website: kidcadaver.com

Kid Cadaver is an American pop punk band formed in 2011 between Los Angeles, California natives Raymond Venta (lead vocals) / (bass guitar) and Kenzo Cardenas (drums). The Kid Cadaver moniker was adopted by the group to represent the process of growing older and losing sight of one's inner youth.

== History ==
=== Origins and Formation ===
In late 2012, Raymond Venta, Jeremy Harris, and Kenzo Cardenas were a group of mutual friends who had run into each other while frequenting a local LA studio with various projects. The simultaneous dissolution of their former groups led to the formation of Kid Cadaver. They would later enter into The Lab Studios in Los Angeles, California with High School friend Frankie Siragusa to begin writing Indie rock and Neon pop songs.

=== Kid Cadaver EP (2013) ===
Kid Cadaver released their debut self-titled EP in the spring of 2013. The album quickly achieved success with support from Los Angeles-based radio stations KROQ-FM 106.7 and Alt 98.7FM, which both featured "Teach You the Tongue" on their Local Artists shows. Soon after, the trio began playing a rigorous touring cycle throughout the west coast in support of the release.

=== Roam EP (2015) ===
Kid Cadaver released their second EP, Roam, in the winter of 2015. It was preceded by the release of their single "Keep Well" which was premiered via Alternative Press and widely received amongst fans and listeners. The band's current sound has often been closely aligned with the neon pop subgenre. "If neon pop-punk had a new wave revival, this trio would likely lead the pack." Their sophomore release has also been associated with the Pop punk genre. "Kid Cadaver's energetic indie-pop is reminiscent not only of early-2000s punk but also of more recent favorites such as Tokyo Police Club and Passion Pit, complete with infectious gang vocals that uncontrollably inspire singing along. Notable singles include "Keep Well" and "New Friends" which have both been featured for a multitude of weeks on Los Angeles-based radio station KROQ-FM 106.7 FM.

== Discography ==
Extended plays

- New Modern (2011)
- Kid Cadaver (2013)
- Roam (2015)
- Delude (2018)

Singles

- Teach You The Tongue (2013)
- Stable (2013)
- Keep Well (2015)
- New Friends (2015)
- Personal Addict (2016)
- sleep touching (2018)

== Current members ==
- Raymond Venta – lead vocals, bass guitar, baritone guitar (Since 2012)
- Kenzo Cardenas – drums, vocals (Since 2012)
