= Fuck Art =

Studio album by the Dirty Nil
- Released: January 1, 2021
- Studios: Tape Studios, Hamilton, Ontario, Canada; Union Sounds Company, Toronto, Ontario, Canada
- Genres: Alternative rock; punk rock; pop-punk
- Length: 35:06
- Label: Dine Alone
- Producer: John Goodmanson

The Dirty Nil chronology
Master Volume (2018)	Fuck Art (2021)	Free Rein to Passions (2023)

Professional ratings
Aggregate scores
Source	Rating
AnyDecentMusic?	7.1/10
Metacritic	68/100
Review scores
Source	Rating
Exclaim!	7/10
Upset	4/5 stars

Fuck Art is the third studio album by Canadian alternative rock band the Dirty Nil. It was released on January 1, 2021, by Dine Alone Records.

== Release ==
The Dirty Nil announced the release of their third studio album on August 17, 2020.

=== Singles ===
On June 17, 2020, The Dirty Nil released their first single "Done With Drugs". The single is described as a "poppy, riff-heavy single that is less a sobriety anthem and more a meta mockery of social media posts about sobriety." In a press release, lead musician Luke Bentham explained the meaning behind the single:

"At this time in my life, I see a lot of people who are trying to stop doing cocaine or stop drinking rivers of liquor, or stop eating lots of shitty fast food. On Facebook, I see these posts from people declaring, 'I'm done with this!' – they’ll have a six-paragraph post about how they’re changing their lives. I'm definitely not against self-betterment, and I'm not trying to make light of anyone's struggle; I'm just kind of amused and fascinated by that whole aspect of social media. Like someone will post, 'I'm done drinking coffee!' Okay, well then just stop drinking coffee – you don’t have to try to stop the internet for the day to tell everybody that you’re done with Maxwell House! I find that funny, and somewhat narcissistic. But that’s just my opinion, and I’m kind of an asshole!"

=== Music videos ===
The Dirty Nil released the music video to "Done With Drugs" on YouTube on July 7, 2020. It was directed by Mitch Barnes and Victor Barnes. The video was shot in a warehouse with the use of drone cameras.

The second video "Doom Boy" was released on August 18, 2020.

On November 11, 2020, the third official video "Blunt Force Concussion" was released on YouTube.

Their last video on the LP "Elvis 77" was released on Youtube on March 3, 2021. This video featured fan submissions in order to create something amidst the COVID-19 pandemic. This video also features Milwaukee rock band, The Usual Suspects, performing a jackass-esque stunt 49 seconds into the video

== Critical reception ==
Fuck Art was met with "generally favorable" reviews from critics. At Metacritic, which assigns a weighted average rating out of 100 to reviews from mainstream publications, this release received an average score of 68 based on 4 reviews. Aggregator Album of the Year gave the release a 71 out of 100 based on a critical consensus of 9 reviews. AnyDecentMusic? gave a 7.1 out of 10 based on 6 reviews.

Writing for Exclaim!, Adam Feibel wrote "Created in a time of distress and despair, Fuck Art is pure escapism. Their [The Dirty Nil] third album has the kind of punched-up confidence and middle-finger swagger that says they don't intend to be underdogs much longer." Kelsey McClure of Upset Magazine rated the album 4 stars out of 5, explaining "'Fuck Art' is full of clever lyrics that are both parts funny and thought-provoking. The band has created a high-quality record with not a single mediocre song on the tracklist."

== Track listing ==
Fuck Art track listing
No.	Title	Length
1.	"Doom Boy"	3:27
2.	"Blunt Force Concussion"	2:55
3.	"Elvis '77"	2:21
4.	"Done With Drugs"	3:28
5.	"Ride or Die"	2:44
6.	"Hang Yer Moon"	3:09
7.	"Damage Control"	3:17
8.	"Hello Jealousy"	3:15
9.	"Possession"	3:14
10.	"To the Guy Who Stole My Bike"	4:35
11.	"One More and the Bill"	2:41
Total length:		35:06

== Personnel ==
Musicians

- Luke Bentham – vocals, guitar
- Ross Miller – bass
- Kyle Fisher – drums

Production

- John Goodmanson – engineer, mixer, producer
- Adam Bentley – engineer
- Jordan Mitchell - engineer
- Troy Glessner – mastering
- Darren McGill – engineer
