= Shaky Dream =

Studio album by Dinosaur Bones
- Released: August 13, 2013
- Genre: Rock
- Length: 37:29
- Label: Dine Alone
- Producer: John Congleton

Professional ratings
Aggregate scores
Source	Rating
Metacritic	66/100
Review scores
Source	Rating
Allmusic	3.5/5 stars
Consequence of Sound	C+
Exclaim!	8/10

Shaky Dream is the second studio album by Canadian band Dinosaur Bones. It was released in August 2013 under Dine Alone Records.

== Track listing ==
No.	Title	Length
1.	"Dreamers Song"	3:42
2.	"Spins in Circles"	3:06
3.	"Sleepsick"	3:27
4.	"Nothing Left Between the Lines"	4:10
5.	"Go Free"	3:03
6.	"Career Criminal"	3:58
7.	"So Brand New"	3:28
8.	"Don't Decide"	4:10
9.	"Pacifist in Camouflage"	4:11
10.	"End of Life Crisis"	4:14
