= Melon Collie and the Infinite Radness: Part Two =

EP by Tokyo Police Club
- Released: September 23, 2016
- Studio: Taurus Recording (Toronto); Virtue & Vice Studios (New York)
- Genre: Indie rock
- Length: 18:32
- Label: Dine Alone

Tokyo Police Club chronology
Melon Collie and the Infinite Radness: Part One (2016)	Melon Collie and the Infinite Radness: Part Two (2016)	TPC (2018)

Melon Collie and the Infinite Radness: Part Two is a five-track EP released by Canadian indie group Tokyo Police Club on September 23, 2016. The band released the single "My House" on September 2, 2016, to promote the EP.

== Track listing ==
Standard edition
No.	Title	Writer(s)	Length
1.	"My House"	Greg Alsop; Josh Hook; Dave Monks; Graham Wright; Rostam Batmanglij	2:51
2.	"Awesome Day"	Alsop; Hook; Monks; Wright	3:50
3.	"Hang Your Heart"	Alsop; Hook; Monks; Wright	4:43
4.	"Living Like This"	Alsop; Hook; Monks; Wright	3:38
5.	"Vertigo"	Alsop; Hook; Monks; Wright	3:30
Total length:			18:32

== Personnel ==
Adapted from liner notes.

Musicians

- Greg Alsop – songwriting, drums
- Josh Hook – songwriting, electric guitar
- Dave Monks – songwriting, lead vocals, bass guitar; producer (track: 1)
- Graham Wright – songwriting, keyboards, backing vocals, guitar, air horn
- Rostam Batmanglij – keyboards, backing vocals, producer, mixing (track: 1)

Technical

- Jon Drew – engineer (tracks: 1, 3 to 5)
- Nick Rowe – engineer (track: 1)
- Doug Boehm – engineer (track: 2)
- Rocky Gallo – engineer (track: 3)
- Rob Schnapf – mixing
- Brian Rosemeyer – assistant mixing
- John DeBold – assistant mixing
- Mark Chalecki – mastering

Art and management

- Chris Schoonover – photography
- Todd Goldstein – artwork
- Tim Cohan – lettering
- Richard Cohen – management
