= Ten Songs, Ten Years, Ten Days =

Studio album of cover songs by Tokyo Police Club
- Released: October 11, 2011
- Genre: Indie rock, indie pop, post-punk revival
- Length: 39:16
- Label: Mom + Pop, Dine Alone

Tokyo Police Club chronology
Champ (2010)	Ten Songs, Ten Years, Ten Days (2011)	Forcefield (2014)

Ten Songs, Ten Years, Ten Days is a studio album released by the Canadian band Tokyo Police Club on October 11, 2011, through Dine Alone in Canada and Mom + Pop in the USA. The album consists of 10 covers of songs from 10 different years, recorded in 10 days.

== Track listing ==
No.	Title	Original Artist	Length
1.	"Southside feat. Morgan Kibby from M83"	Moby feat. Gwen Stefani	3:24
2.	"Sweetness feat. Michael Angelakos from Passion Pit"	Jimmy Eat World	3:44
3.	"Under Control"	The Strokes	3:57
4.	"Since U Been Gone"	Kelly Clarkson	3:12
5.	"Little Sister feat Orianthi"	Queens of the Stone Age	3:05
6.	"Long Distance Call"	Phoenix	2:52
7.	"All My Friends"	LCD Soundsystem	5:31
8.	"Kim & Jessie feat. Jamie Jackson from Hot As Sun"	M83	4:05
9.	"Strictly Game"	Harlem Shakes	3:44
10.	"Party in the U.S.A"	Miley Cyrus	5:42
