= Smith (EP) =

Smith EP

EP by Tokyo Police Club
- Released: 2007
- Recorded: 2006
- Genre: Indie rock
- Length: 10:17
- Label: Paper Bag Records

Tokyo Police Club chronology
A Lesson in Crime EP (2006)	Smith EP (2007)	Elephant Shell (2008)

Smith EP is a four-track EP that was released by Canadian indie group Tokyo Police Club on October 23, 2007, in Canada and November 6, 2007, in the US.

A download version of the Smith EP was originally available in the Spring of 2007 with only the first three songs and a different cover.

== Reviews ==
Professional ratings
Review scores
Source	Rating
Scene Point Blank	(7.2/10)
Sound Sect	3.5/5 stars
Chart	4/5 stars
Pitchfork Media	(6.8/10)
UKULA Magazine	(favorable)

Reviews of the EP were positive but disappointed by the release of an even shorter EP than A Lesson in Crime instead of a full-length LP album. Pitchfork Media gave a 6.8 rating commenting that "as the indie world collectively holds its breath for the TPC full-length, they first punch us in the gut with the Smith EP, a three-song, eight-minute release that could pass for a free iTunes preview."

Chart gave a review of 5/5 but "deduct[ed] one point for making everyone wait for the LP".

RegnYouth remarked that the EP "makes up for lack of quantity with the quality of the songs" and "one listen and the wait for that LP will only get more frustrating".

UKULA Magazine agrees, saying Smith is "a tease, but as teases do, it leaves you beggin’ for more."

Scene Point Blank and Soundsect.com both reviewed the earlier three-song digital release and agreed that it was "short but sweet". Scene Point Blank gave a 7.2/10 and Soundsect.com gave 3.5 stars out of 5 but exclaimed "At this point in time there just hasn’t been a Tokyo Police Club song released that hasn’t been good."

== Reissue ==
For the record's tenth anniversary, the track "Cut Cut Paste" as well as demo versions of all three original tracks were reissued on the A Lesson in Crime 10th Anniversary Edition.

== Track listing ==
Original download cover.

Standard edition
No.	Title	Length
1.	"Box"	2:33
2.	"Cut Cut Paste"	1:46
3.	"A Lesson in Crime"	3:30
4.	"Be Good (RAC remix)"	2:45
Total length:		10:29

Bonus music videos
No.	Title	Length
1.	"Nature of the Experiment" (directed by George Vale)	2:17
2.	"Cheer It On" (directed by Sean Wainsteim)	2:12
3.	"Citizens of Tomorrow" (directed by Kyle Davison)	2:51
