= The Dirty Nil =

Canadian rock band

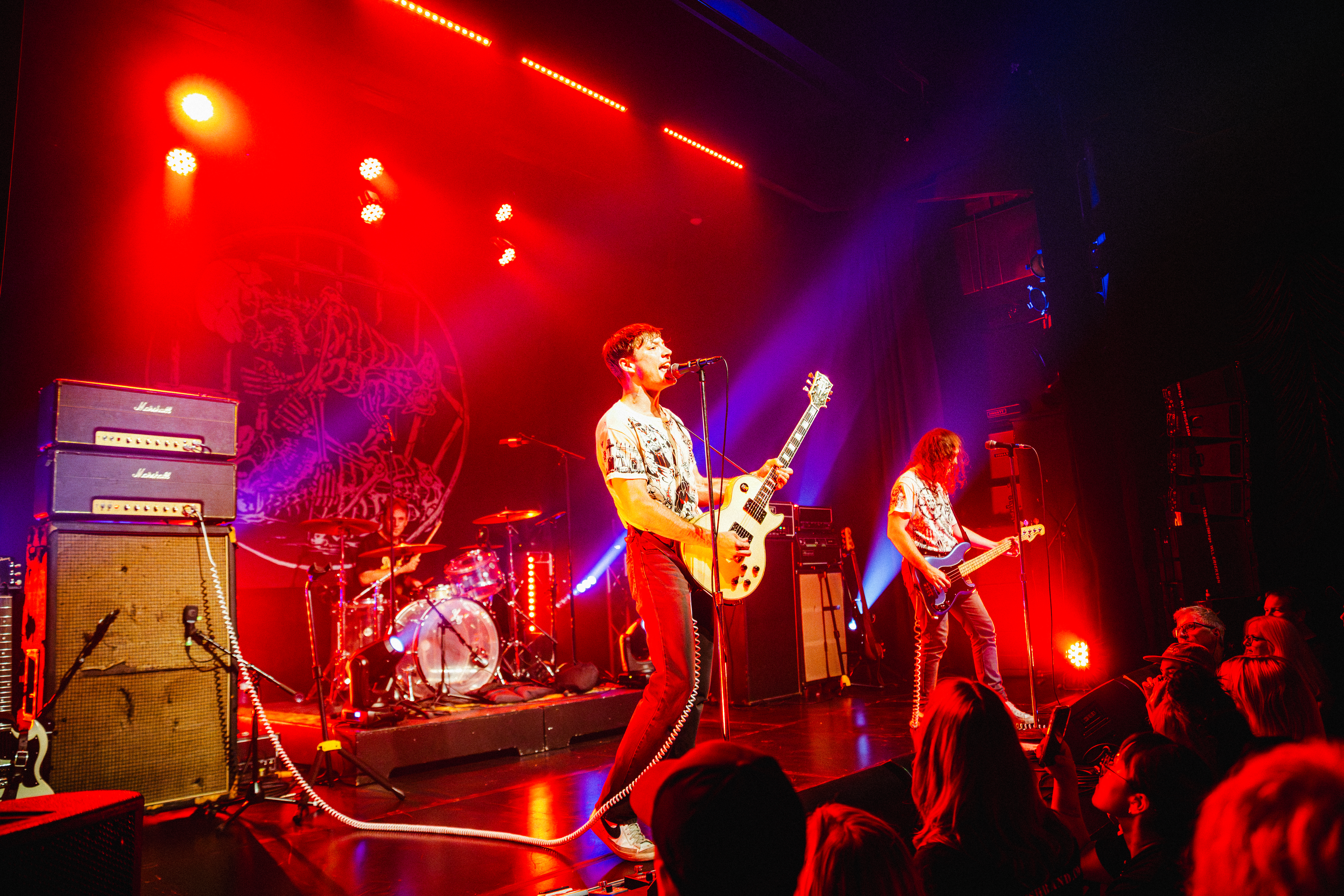
- The Dirty Nil live at Biltmore Theatre in Oshawa 2025

Background information
- Origin: Dundas/Hamilton, Ontario, Canada
- Genres: Punk rock; alternative rock; hard rock
- Years active: 2006–present
- Label: Dine Alone Records
- Members: Luke Bentham; Kyle Fisher; Anthony Vitanza
- Past members: Dave Nardi; Ross Miller; Sam Tomlinson

The Dirty Nil is a Canadian rock band formed in Hamilton, Ontario, in 2006, who won the Juno Award for Breakthrough Group of the Year at the Juno Awards of 2017. The band currently consists of singer and guitarist Luke Bentham, drummer Kyle Fisher, and bassist Anthony Vitanza.

== History ==
=== Formation and beginnings (2006–2010) ===
Luke Bentham and Kyle Fisher began playing together in high school, and formed The Dirty Nil in 2006. Originally made up as a two piece band they put out their first self titled EP on CD in 2008. In 2009, David Nardi joined the band on bass and backing vocals. Nardi's addition to the lineup was the first permanent lineup within the group. The band recorded and released their second EP Saccharine Visceral on CD in 2009 in part with Wolfshirt Records.

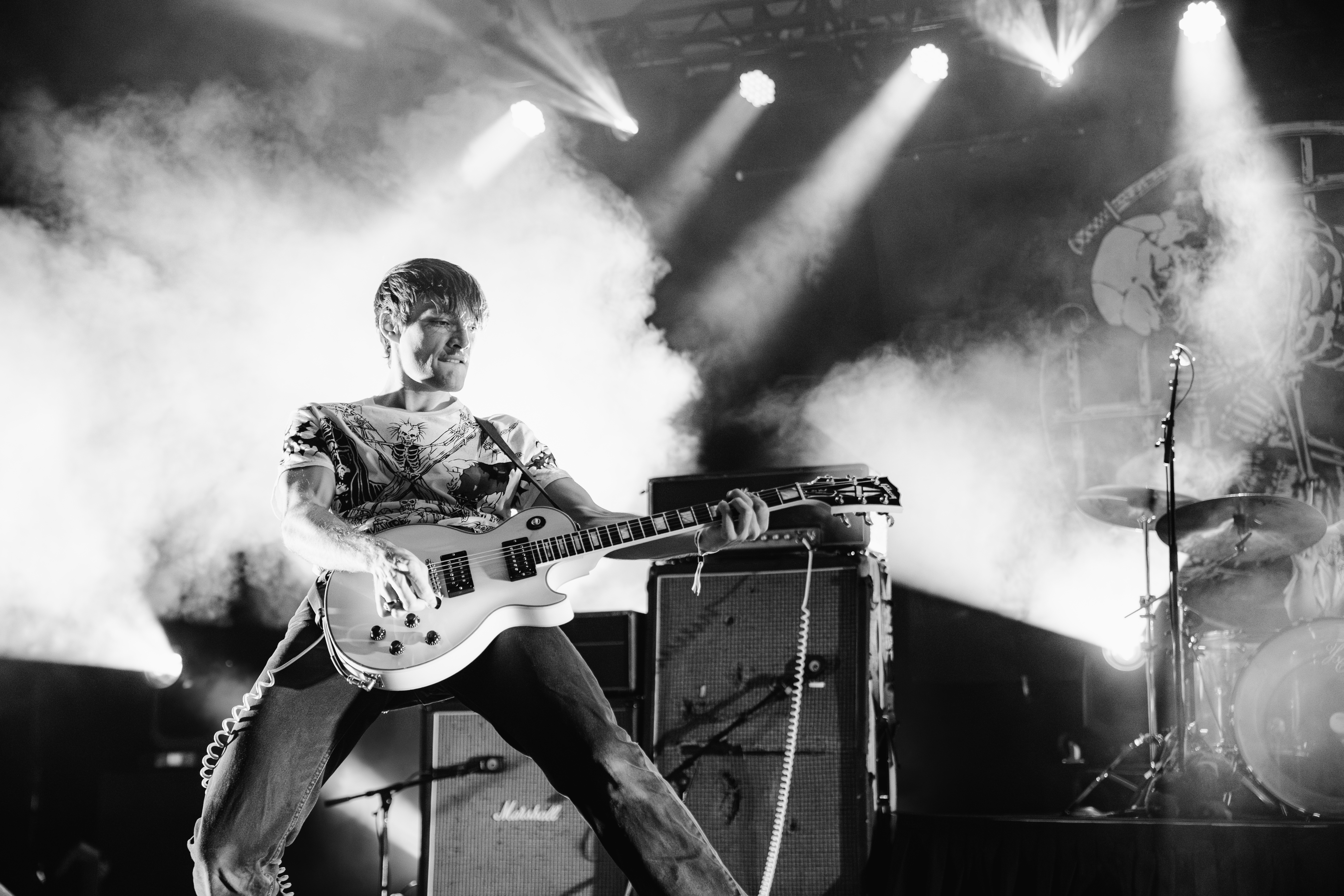
Bentham playing in Toronto (2025)

=== "Fuckin' Up Young" to Higher Power (2011–2016) ===
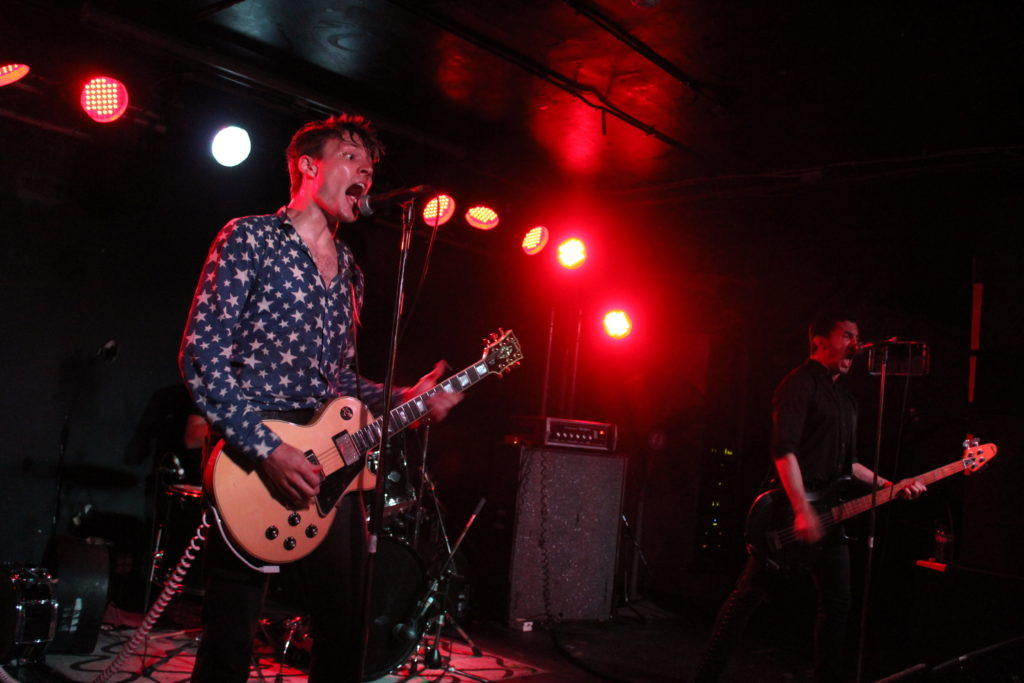
Bentham (left) and Nardi in 2016

They released their digital debut single "Fuckin' Up Young" in 2011, and began touring North America, performing in clubs and at festivals. In 2012, the band released the single "Little Metal Baby Fist". In 2014, the band's first wide-scale EP released with Smite. This EP brought more attention to the band with songs like "Nicotine", "Beat", and "Wrestle Yü To Hüsker Dü". Also releasing in 2014 was the "Cinnamon/Guided By Vices" single in part with Fat Wreck Chords. On February 26, 2016, The Dirty Nil released their debut album Higher Power with Dine Alone Records. With this release, the band started to gain considerable traction and attention. The band embarked on headlining and supporting tours of Canada, Europe, the United Kingdom, and the United States. At the end of 2016, bassist David Nardi left the band.

=== Minimum R&B to Fuck Art (2017–2021) ===
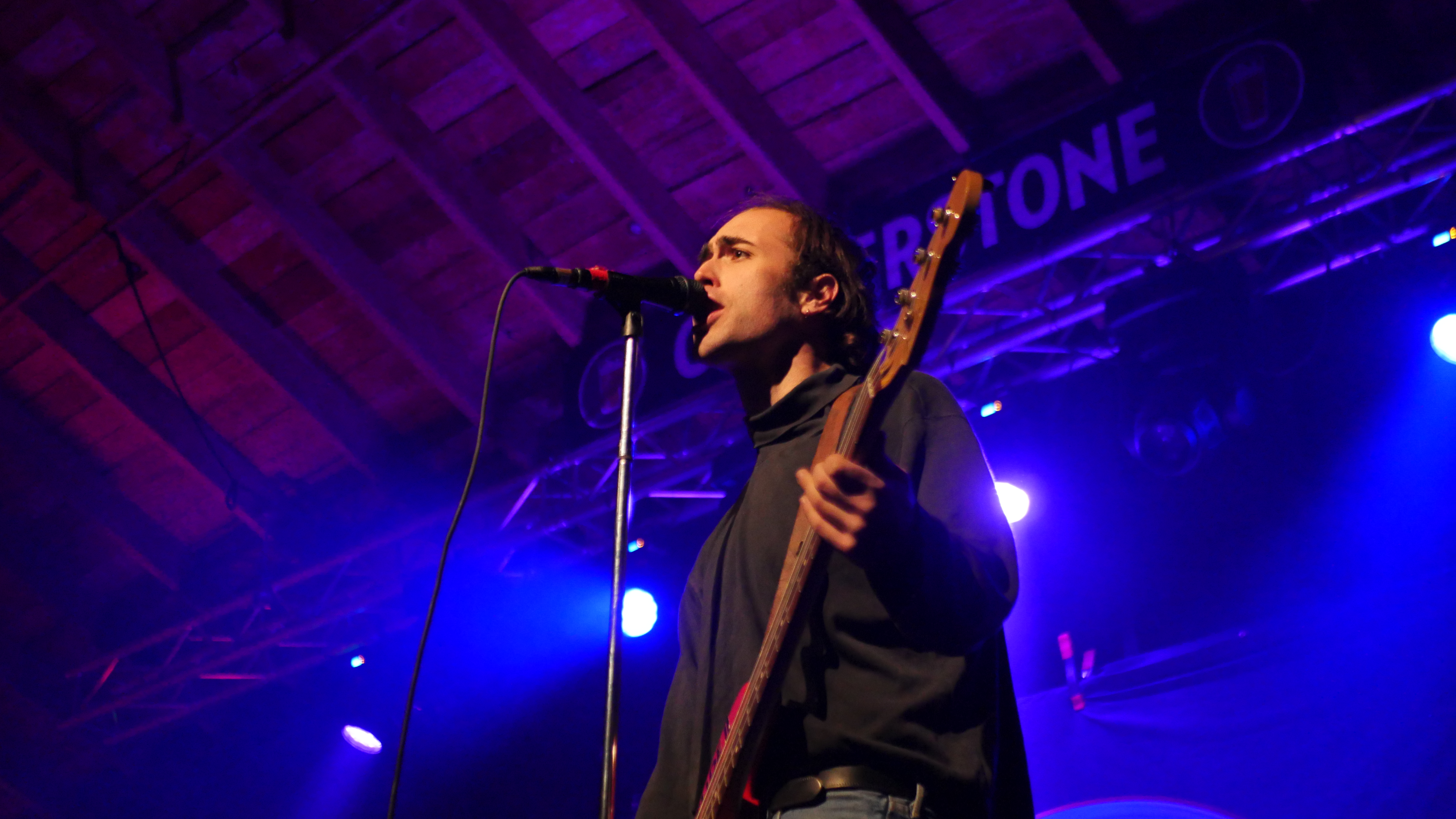
Former bassist Ross Miller performing in Berkeley, California, in 2019

The Dirty Nil joined Billy Talent on their 2017 Afraid of Heights tour. Michael Peterson (formerly of Single Mothers) joined the band as a touring member throughout this tour. On April 28, 2017, the band released Minimum R&B, a compilation of the early singles and EP tracks from Smite and Saccharine Visceral. In March 2017, Ross Miller joined as the new bassist of The Dirty Nil. To support the release of Minimum R&B, the band toured throughout Europe, Canada, and the United Kingdom. The Dirty Nil won a Juno award for Breakthrough Group of the Year at the 2017 Juno Awards. The Dirty Nil released their second studio album Master Volume on September 14, 2018, on Dine Alone Records, and released the first single from the album, "Bathed in Light". The band embarked on tours of Europe, the United Kingdom, the United States, and Canada to support the release of Master Volume, ending the tour at The Opera House in Toronto. In 2019, the band embarked on tours of Canada, The United States, the UK, and Germany. During the February Germany tour, Jonathan Gallant of Billy Talent filled in on bass for Miller due to a broken hand. In November 2019, the band released the "Astro Ever After/Idiot Victory" singles backed by the Idiot Victory tour with Single Mothers. In August of 2020, the band announced a new album titled Fuck Art. During the Covid-19 pandemic, the band put on a digital livestream tour titled the "Dancing 2 Thrash" Tour, backed by singles, "Done with Drugs", "Blunt Force Concussion", and "Doom Boy". On January 1, 2021, Fuck Art was released. The band would do another livestream tour due to the pandemic during April and May of 2021. On October 1st, 2021, the band announced the departure of Ross Miller from The Dirty Nil.

=== The Lash to Live at the Dine Alone Store (2021–present) ===
With a short tour scheduled for November and December of this 2021. The band recruited Sam Tomlinson as the new bassist for the band. The band released their first single with Sam, "Bye Bye Big Bear" on November 18, 2022. In April and May 2023, the band released two singles, "Nicer Guy" and "Celebration", as part of the lead up to their fourth album. On May 26, 2023, the band released its fourth full-length album: Free Rein to Passions, which Kerrang! reviewer Aliya Chaudhry said "strikes a balance between joking around and being vulnerable". The band embarked on a supporting tour throughout Canada, the United States, and the United Kingdom, throughout the rest of 2023. At the beginning of 2025, Tomlinson left the band. From May to August 2025, Kian Sorouri filled in on bass guitar during the bands United States and Canada shows. On April 16, 2025, the band announced their fifth studio album, The Lash, which released on July 25, 2025, through Dine Alone Records. In September 2025, Anthony Vitanza joined the band as their new bassist. To support The Lash, the band toured Canada, Europe, the United Kingdom, and the United States, with Sorouri playing bass during the shows in the United States. On December 5th, 2025, the band released their first live album, Live at the Dine Alone Store.

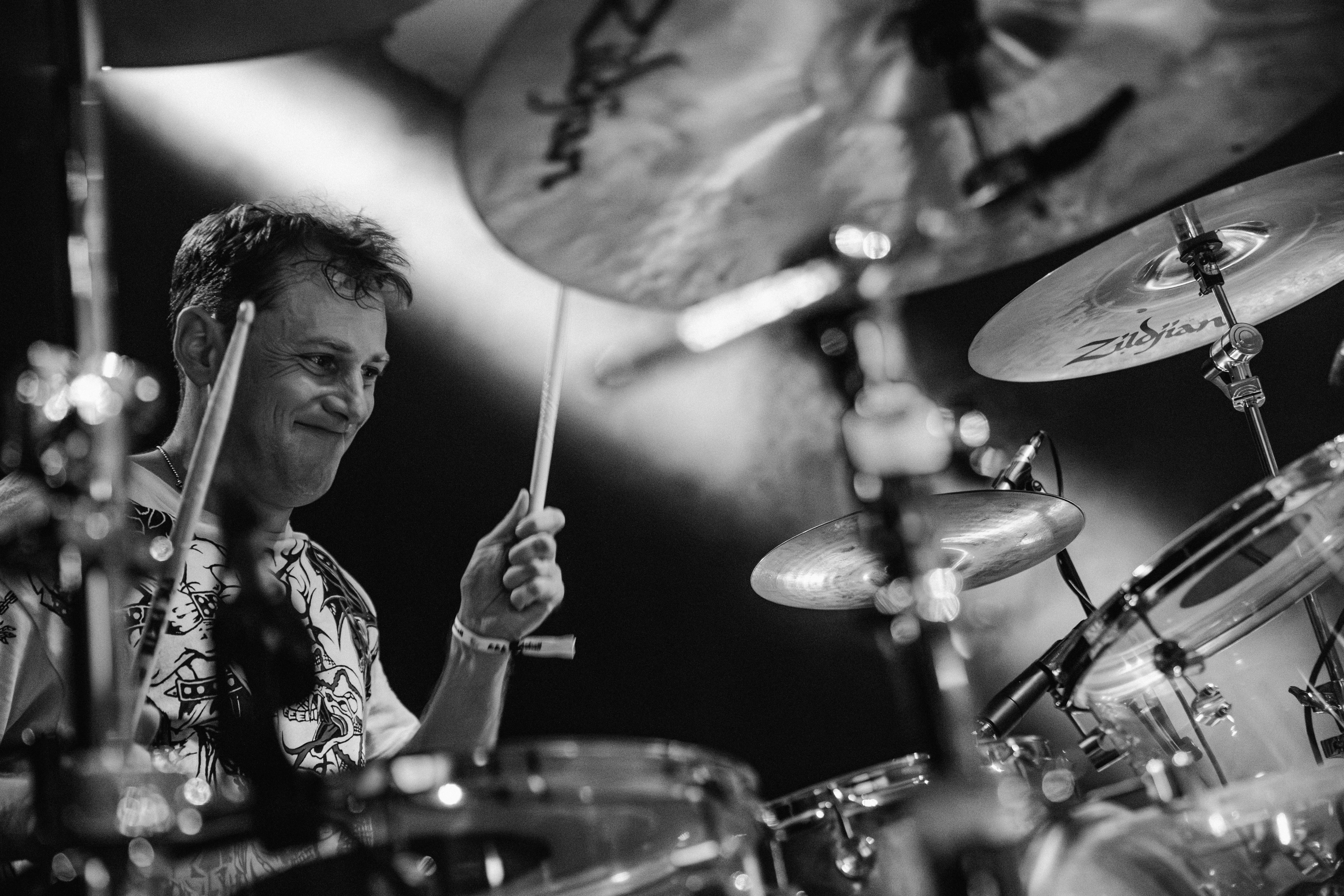
Kyle live in Toronto, Canada 2025

== Musical style ==
Music critics commonly label the band under the punk rock genre. The band mixes the swaggering riffs of hard rock with the attitude and energy of punk. Despite these classifications, the band said in a 2015 interview with Vice that they do not define themselves as a punk band but rather define themselves as just a rock band. In a 2023 interview with New Noise Magazine, however, frontman Luke Bentham walked back those comments, stating: "When I originally held that view, I think that the term punk was a very loaded word in our circle of bands where it was very frowned upon to call yourself a punk band because that had to be an accolade that others bestowed upon us. It was a medal that you earned to be punk, and you couldn't call yourself punk. I don't believe in any of that crap anymore. But when you're 24, and you really care about the opinions of the people in your scene."

== Band members ==
=== Current ===
- Luke Bentham – lead vocals, guitar (2006–present)
- Kyle Fisher – drums (2006–present)
- Anthony Vitanza – bass guitar, backing vocals (2025–present)

=== Former permanent members ===
- Dave Nardi – bass guitar, backing vocals (2009–2016)
- Ross Miller – bass guitar, backing vocals (2017–2021)
- Sam Tomlinson – bass guitar, backing vocals (2021–2025)

=== Former touring members ===
- Kian Sorouri – bass guitar, backing vocals (2025-2025)
- Jonathan Gallant – bass guitar, backing vocals (2019-2019)
- Michael Peterson – bass guitar, backing vocals (2017-2017)

== Discography ==
=== Studio albums ===
- Higher Power (2016)
- Master Volume (2018)
- Fuck Art (2021)
- Free Rein to Passions (2023)
- The Lash (2025)

=== Live albums ===
- Live at the Dine Alone Store (2025)

=== Compilations ===
- Nil Tape (2012)
- Minimum R&B (2017)
- You're Welcome (2018)

=== EPs ===
- The Dirty Nil (2008)
- Saccharine Visceral (2009)
- Summer Mix – Tape Vol. 2: Covers (2013)
- The Dirty Nil Record Club Volume 1 (2013)
- The Dirty Nil Record Club Volume 2 (2013)
- Smite (2014)
- The Dirty Nil Record Club Volume 3 (2014)
- The Dirty Nil Record Club Volume 4 (2015)
- Little Elephant Session (2016)
- The Dirty Nil Record Club Volume 5 (2016)
- The Dirty Nil on Audiotree Live (2016)
- The Dirty Nil Record Club Volume 6 (2017)
- Little Elephant Session 2 (2018)
- Master Volume (2019)
- The Big Rip (2022) – split Cam Kahin, Ashlee Schatze, Spirit Desire

=== Singles ===
- "Fuckin' Up Young" (2011)
- "Little Metal Baby Fist" (2012)
- "Zombie Eyed" (2013) – split single with Northern Primitive
- "Cinnamon" / "Guided by Vices" (2014)
- "No Weaknesses" (2015)
- "Friends In The Sky" (2016) – split single with Food Court
- "Caroline" (2017)
- "Surrender" (2018)
- "Bathed in Light" / "Queen Bitch" (2018)
- "Pain of Infinity" (2018)
- "I Don't Want That Phone Call" (2018)
- "That's What Heaven Feels Like" (2018) – No. 31 Mainstream Rock Songs
- "Unchained" (2018)
- Live from Saturday Night Livestream (2019)
- You're Welcome I (2019)
- "Astro Ever After" (2019)
- You're Welcome II (2019)
- You're Welcome III (2019)
- You're Welcome VI (2019)
- "Idiot Victory" (2019)
- "Christmas at My House" (2019)
- "Done With Drugs" (2020)
- "Doom Boy" (2020)
- "Blunt Force Concussion" (2020) - No. 34 Alternative Airplay
- "One More and the Bill" (2020)
- "School" (Live) (2021)
- "Bye Bye Big Bear" (2022)
- "Nicer Guy" (2023)
- "Celebration" (2023)
- "I Hate The Internet" / "True Devotion" (2025)
- "Gallop of the Hounds (2025)
