= Monk (hardcore punk band) =

Hardcore punk band from Los Angeles, California

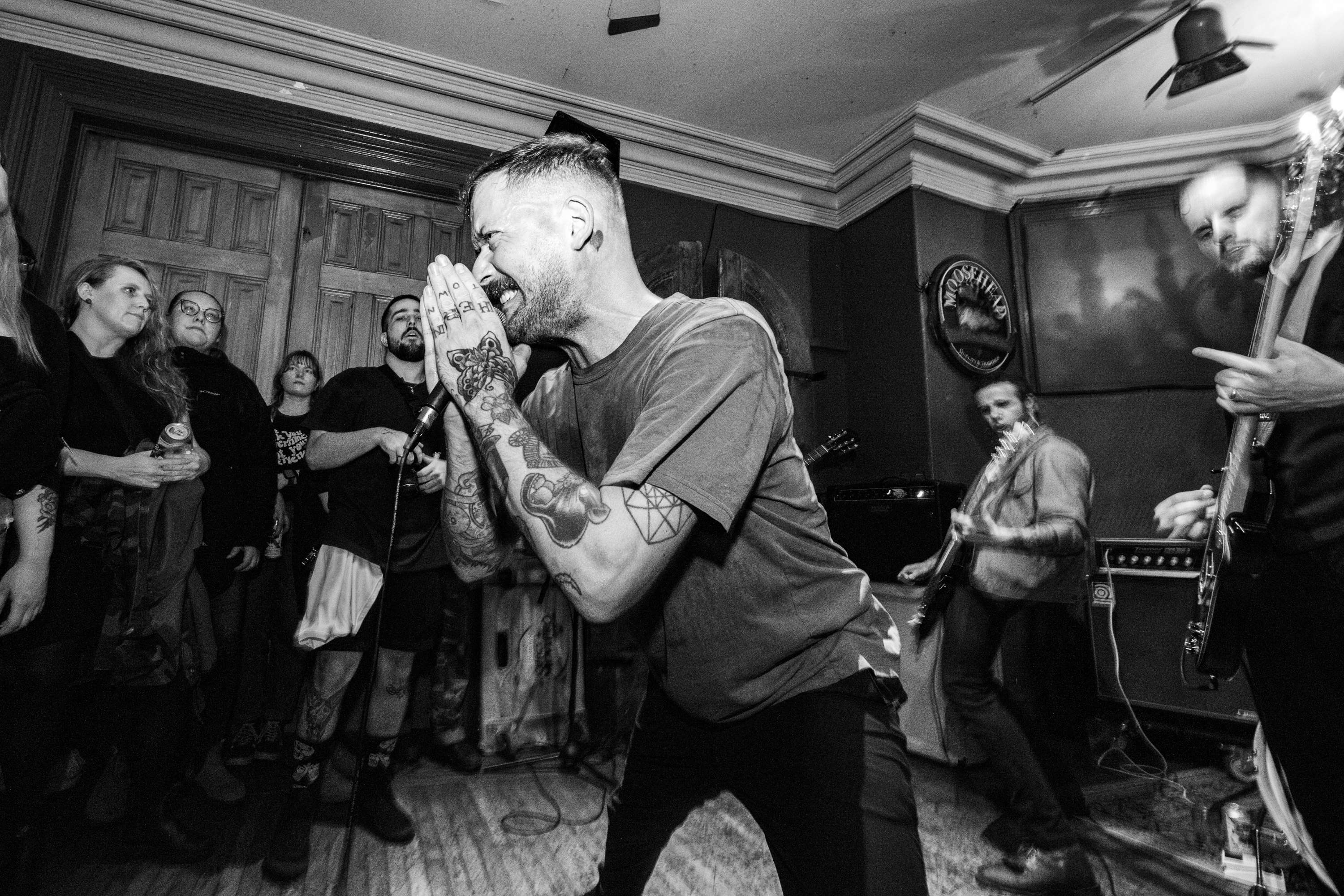
- Monk in Hamilton, Ontario, 2023

Background information
- Origin: Los Angeles, California, United States
- Genres: Hardcore punk
- Years active: 2023–present
- Labels: Dine Alone Records, Tarantula Tapes
- Members: Frank Bach
- Website: www.monk.la

Monk is a hardcore punk band from Los Angeles, California, formed in 2023 by Frank Bach (formerly of Vicious Cycle). Their debut EP Rock was produced by Frank Bach and Ian Romano and released through Dine Alone Records in 2023.

== History ==
Monk's first live performance and record release took place in August 2023 in Sudbury, Ontario. No Echo described the debut EP as blending hardcore punk with mindfulness and incorporating a 12-minute guided meditation on its B-side.

Following the release, Monk toured the United States, Canada, and Mexico, appearing on tour dates with D.O.A. and Single Mothers.

In 2023, Monk released the single "Monk Stomp," which featured Liam Cormier of Cancer Bats. Punknews included the track in its "Editor’s Picks" roundup of new bands to watch.

In February 2025, Monk released the single "Dark Side of the Mind," featuring guest vocals by Brendan Murphy of Counterparts. The release was accompanied by a music video directed by Jovanni Martinez, according to Lambgoat. V13 later announced that the full EP Dark Side of the Mind would be released in April 2025 through Dine Alone Records and Tarantula Tapes.

Punknews published a track-by-track feature for the EP, where Frank Bach described its themes of duality and introspection. That same year, the band also appeared on Punknews Podcast #691, discussing their mindful ethos and use of social media, and premiering a guided meditation segment.

== Style ==
Monk's sound has been described as "zen hardcore," a fusion of hardcore punk aggression with elements of spiritual reflection. According to New Noise, Bach's background in mindfulness practice and his former role as a design lead at the meditation app Headspace shaped the band's lyrical and aesthetic direction.

== Philanthropy ==
According to the band's official website, Monk maintains a “Giving Back” initiative that supports mental health organizations, reproductive justice initiatives, migrant support networks, environmental causes, and community aid groups. In 2023, New Noise reported that the band also participated in the Forever Wildland Fest in California, which raised funds for wildland firefighters.

== Discography ==
Extended plays

- Rock (2023, Dine Alone Records)
- Dark Side of the Mind (2025, Dine Alone Records/Tarantula Tapes)
