= Higher Power (The Dirty Nil album) =

Studio album by the Dirty Nil
- Released: February 26, 2016
- Recorded: Engineered at Candle Recordings Toronto and Tape in Hamilton, Ontario
- Genre: Punk rock, rock and roll
- Length: 26:43
- Label: Dine Alone Records
- Producer: The Dirty Nil, Shehzaad Jiwani, Adam Bentley

The Dirty Nil chronology
Higher Power (2016)	Master Volume (2018)

Professional ratings
Aggregate scores
Source	Rating
Metacritic	73/100
Review scores
Source	Rating
Exclaim!	7/10
Pitchfork	6.8/10
Punknews.org	4.5/5 stars
SLUG Magazine	(positive)
Spill Magazine	4.5/5 stars
Visions	9/12

Higher Power is the debut studio album of Canadian band the Dirty Nil. It was released on February 26, 2016, by Dine Alone Records. The only single from Higher Power, "No Weaknesses", was released on November 6, 2015. Music videos have been produced for "No Weaknesses", "Zombie Eyed", "Wrestle Yü To Hüsker Dü" and "Friends in the Sky".

== Track listing ==
All tracks are written by the Dirty Nil.

No.	Title	Length
1.	"No Weaknesses"	2:28
2.	"Zombie Eyed"	3:18
3.	"Wrestle Yü To Hüsker Dü"	2:28
4.	"Lowlives"	2:37
5.	"Friends in the Sky"	2:30
6.	"Violent Hands"	2:44
7.	"Know Your Rodent"	2:38
8.	"Fugue State"	0:44
9.	"Bruto Bloody Bruto"	1:45
10.	"Helium Dreamer"	2:02
11.	"Bury Me at the Rodeo"	3:29
Total length:		26:43

== Personnel ==
The Dirty Nil

- Luke Bentham – lead vocals, guitar
- David Nardi – bass, vocals, backing vocals
- Kyle Fischer – drums

Others

- John Goodmanson – mixing
- Dave Schiffman – recording, mixing
- Adam Bentley, Jordan Mitchell - engineer, production
- Josh Korody - additional production
- Troy Glessner – mastering
- Alex Roulette – cover painting
- Yoshi Cooper - photos
- David Nardi - design and layout
