= Streets of Laredo (band) =

- Origin: Auckland, New Zealand
- Genres: Folk-pop, Indie rock, Indie folk, Alternative rock
- Years active: 2012–present
- Label: Dine Alone Records
- Members: David Gibson; Daniel Gibson; Sarahjane Gibson; Sean McMahon; Andrew McGovern; Cameron Deyell
- Past members: Thom Darlow, Si Moore

Streets of Laredo is a folk-pop band originally from Auckland, New Zealand but now based in Brooklyn, New York. The band is composed of Dave Gibson (vocals, drums), Daniel Gibson (lead vocals, acoustic guitar) Sarahjane Gibson (vocals, melodica, percussion), Sean McMahon (bass and backing vocals), Cameron Deyell (electric guitar and backing vocals) and Andrew McGovern (trumpet, percussion, and synth). The band has released two albums: Volume I & II (2014) and Wild (2016).

== Founding and early career ==
Dave Gibson and his younger brother Daniel already had experience as musicians. Dave used to be the vocalist in the New Zealand band Elemeno P while Daniel was the vocalist of a pop-punk band called Kingston. Dave ran a T-shirt business and hired Daniel soon after he left the music scene to work in his company. However, both brothers routinely began to write and work on demo songs frequently. Dave, his spouse Sarahjane, and his brother Daniel, formed the band around the time they moved to New York in 2012. However, before the trio relocated to New York they played one show in their hometown. The group named their band based on the classic ballad Streets of Laredo. The band soon after also consisted of Si Moore, Cameron Deyell, and Thom Darlow. Their first single "Girlfriend" was first imagined by Daniel between the time they left New Zealand and relocated to New York. He continued working on the song once he moved to New York. The single was self-released on December 10, 2012 to positive acclaim. A music video for the track was released soon after.

== Vol. I & II: from EP to debut album ==
In early 2013, the band traveled back to New Zealand to work and record nine new tracks which would be split into two EPs. In August 2013, the band won first prize in the adult album alternative category of Nashville's Unsigned Only Awards. In October 2013, the band won the AAA category for unsigned artists at the CMJ Music Marathon. In late 2013, they released the two EPs Volume I and Volume II which received positive reviews. Many changes occurred during this period like the addition of other members like Sean McMahon and Andrew McGovern. After the self-release of the two EPs, Streets of Laredo signed on to Dine Alone Records. The band released their first EP Lonsdale Line for the label on June 10, 2014. A single track "Slow Train" released in August 2014. A single from their forthcoming debut album titled "Laredo" dropped in September 2014. The band released their first official album Volume I & II (by putting together the two EPs) on October 7, 2014, via Dine Alone Records. The reviews for the album were generally favorable.

== Wild and onwards ==
From early to mid-2015, the band toured in America and Europe for their debut album. During these tours and concerts, Streets or Laredo began to work on new tracks for their future album Wild. They began recording demos in early 2015. A single called "Diamonds" was released on 2 June 2015. A single from the forthcoming LP titled "99.9%" was released on 24 June 2016. A unrelated single titled "Devil and the Sea" dropped on 9 July 2016. Wild was released on October 21, 2016, and was notably produced by John Agnello. The album had political, experimental, and cultural undertones which were topics that influenced the band. Wild received some positive reviews. After finishing playing and touring for Wild by early 2017, it was reported that the band would begin working on new material for a third LP.

== Discography ==
=== Albums ===
- Volume I & II (2014)
- Wild (2016)

=== EPs ===
- Volume I (2013)
- Volume II (2013)
- Lonsdale Line (2014)

=== Singles ===
- "Diamonds" (2015)
- "Devil and the Sea" (2016)
