= Hey Marseilles =

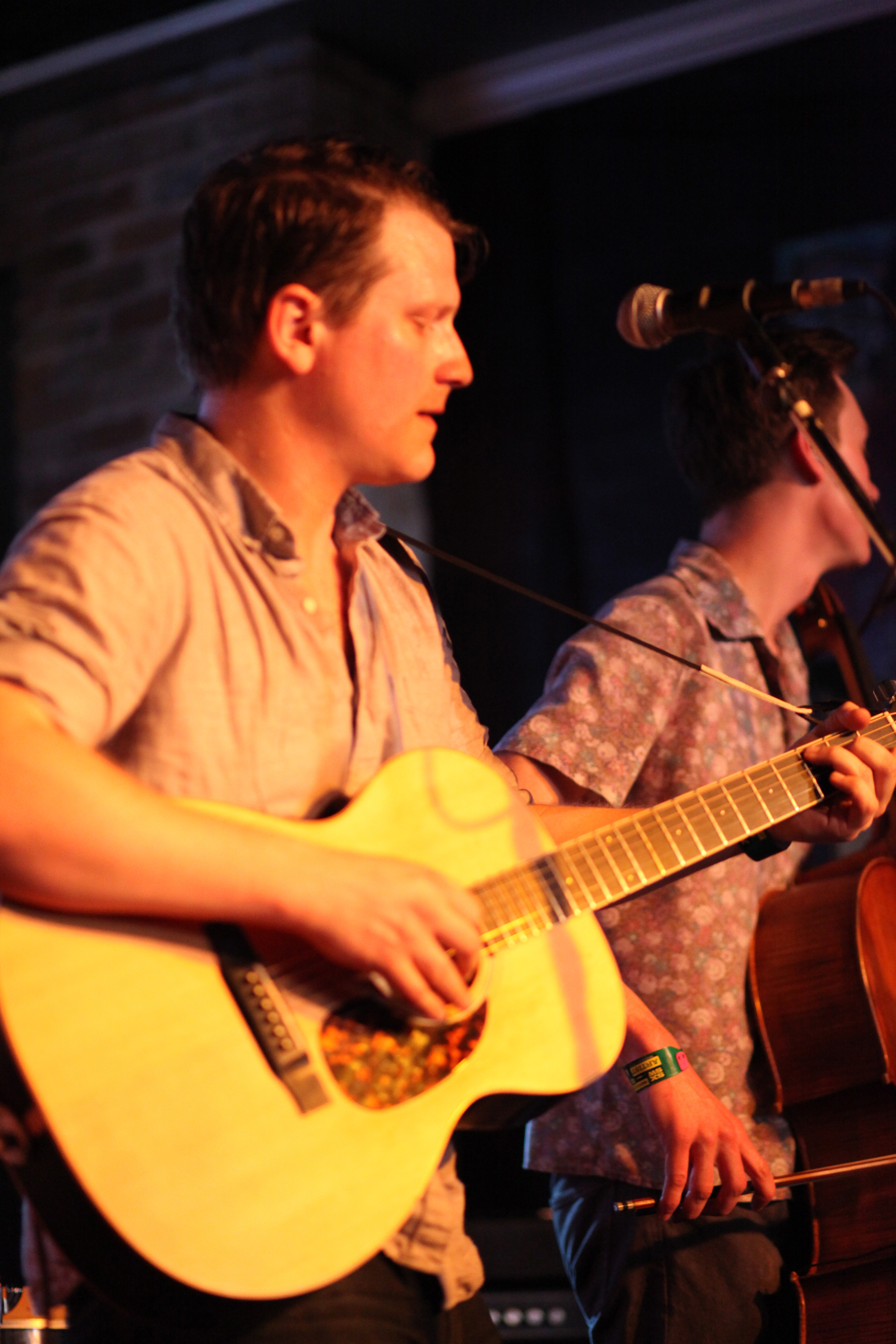

Background information
- Origin: Seattle, Washington
- Genres: Indie folk, indie pop, folk rock, Chamber Pop
- Years active: 2006–2019
- Labels: eOne Music; Dine Alone Records; Onto Entertainment; Independent
- Members: Matt Bishop; Nick Ward; Philip Kobernik; Samuel Anderson; Jacob Anderson
- Past members: Colin Richey; Victor Olavarria; Dan Hubert; Patrick Brannon
- Website: heymarseilles.com

Hey Marseilles is an indie folk and chamber pop band from Seattle, Washington founded in 2006 and active until 2019.

== History ==
The band self-released its first album in 2008 and opened early in its career for groups such as Mt. St. Helens Vietnam Band and Parts & Labor. This album was reissued in 2010. A second album, Lines We Trace, arrived in 2013. They then met Anthony Kilhoffer, an LA-based producer and engineer in 2013. Kilhoffer decided to work with them in producing their third album, Hey Marseilles. Hey Marseilles have been on hiatus since 2019.

== Band members ==
- Matt Bishop – lead vocals, acoustic guitar
- Nick Ward – guitar, mandolin
- Philip Kobernik – accordion, piano
- Samuel Anderson – cello, electric bass
- Jacob Anderson – viola

== Discography ==
Albums

- 2008: To Travels and Trunks (Self-released)
- 2013: Lines We Trace (Thirty Tigers)
- 2016: Hey Marseilles (Shanachie Records/Dine Alone Records)

Singles

- "Rio" (2008)
- "To Travels and Trunks" (2010)
- "West Coast" (2015)
