= Melon Collie and the Infinite Radness: Part One =

EP by Tokyo Police Club
- Released: April 8, 2016
- Recorded: 2015
- Studio: Taurus Recording (Toronto); Virtue & Vice Studios (New York)
- Genre: Indie rock
- Length: 16:42
- Label: Dine Alone
- Producer: Dave Monks

Tokyo Police Club chronology
Forcefield (2014)	Melon Collie and the Infinite Radness: Part One (2016)	Melon Collie and the Infinite Radness: Part Two (2016)

Melon Collie and the Infinite Radness: Part One is a five-track EP released by Canadian indie group Tokyo Police Club on April 8, 2016. The band released the single "Not My Girl" on February 19, 2016, to promote the EP. The title of this EP (and its successive Part Two) is a pun paying homage to the 1995 album Mellon Collie and the Infinite Sadness by The Smashing Pumpkins.

== Track listing ==
Standard edition
No.	Title	Writer(s)	Length
1.	"Not My Girl"	Greg Alsop; Josh Hook; Dave Monks; Graham Wright	2:59
2.	"PCH"	Monks; Dave Bassett	3:14
3.	"The Ocean"	Alsop; Hook; Monks; Wright	3:42
4.	"Losing You"	Alsop; Hook; Monks; Wright	3:36
5.	"Please Don't Let Me Down"	Alsop; Hook; Monks; Wright	3:11
Total length:			16:42

== Personnel ==
Musicians

- Dave Monks – lead vocals, bass guitar, songwriting, producer
- Graham Wright – keyboards, guitar, air horn, songwriting
- Josh Hook – guitar, songwriting
- Greg Alsop – drums, songwriting
- Dave Bassett – songwriting (track: 2)
- Anne Douris – backing vocals (track: 2)
- Jon Drew – tambourine

Technical

- Jon Drew – engineer
- Rob Schnapf – mixing
- Brian Rosemeyer – assistant mixing
- John DeBold – assistant mixing
- Mark Chalecki – mastering

Art

- Chris Shoonover – photography
- Todd Goldstein – artwork
- Hunter Devolin – layout
