= New Swears =

Canadian musical group

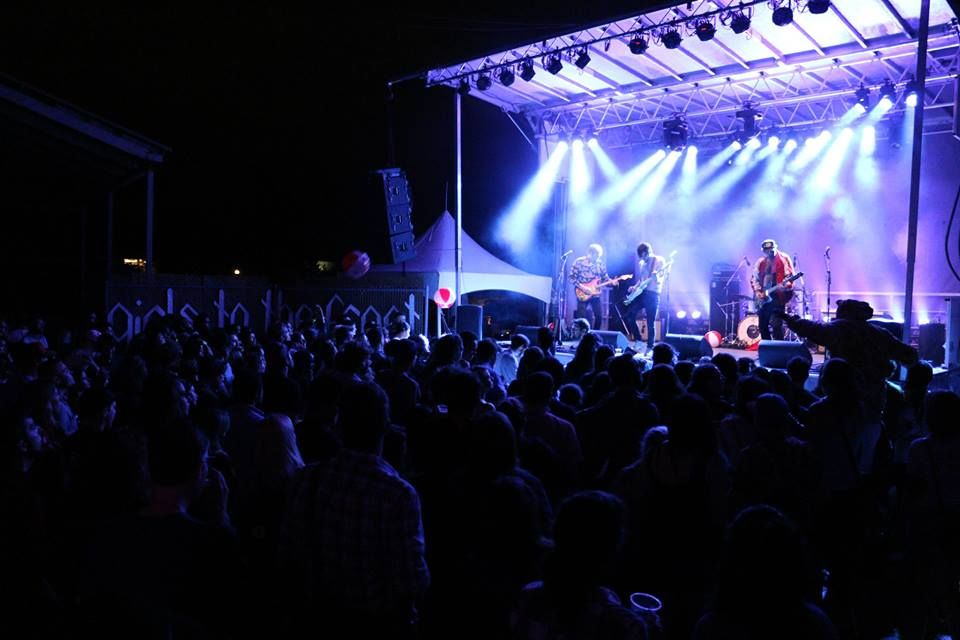
- New Swears performing at Arboretum Fest, Ottawa, 2015

Background information
- Origin: Bells Corners, Ottawa, Ontario, Canada
- Genres: Indie rock, punk rock, garage punk
- Years active: 2012–present
- Labels: Dine Alone Records; Bruised Tongue Records. Bachelor Records; Dirt Cult Records
- Members: Sammy J. Scorpion, Beej Eh, Nick Nofun, Stone

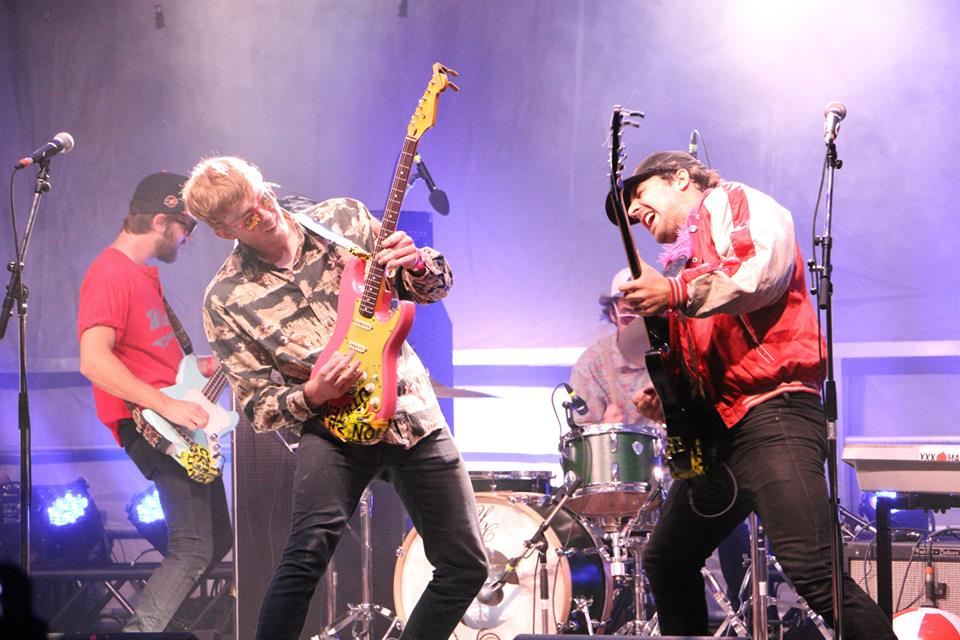
New Swears performing at Arboretum Fest, Ottawa, 2015

New Swears is a four-piece Canadian band consisting of Sammy J. Scorpion, Beej Eh, Nick Nofun, Stoney, and S-Mike. Their music has been classified as garage punk or power pop.

== History ==
New Swears was formed in 2012 in Ottawa, Ontario at the Fun Boy Club House, where the band lived. New Swears are composed of brothers Beej Eh and Sammy J. Scorpion, with Nick Nofun, and Scru Bar. The band released its first LP, Funny Isn't Real, in 2013 on cassette under Bruised Tongue Records and released it on vinyl shortly thereafter through Dirt Cult Records and Bachelor Records. Their second album, Junkfood Forever, Bedtime Whatever (reviews), was released in 2014 under Bachelor Records and later under Dirt Cult Records.

New Swears signed with Dine Alone Records on 7 October 2016 and in that same month released as singles, "Brand New Spot" and "Sugar Heavy Metal" on 7" vinyl and digital formats under Dine Alone Records. Their third full-length LP, And the Magic of Horses (reviews), was released in June 2017 under Dine Alone Records. New Swears released two singles, "Illuminati Knights" and "Happy Birthday" under Dine Alone Records in December 2017. All proceeds from the sale of the tracks went towards For Pivots Sake and Girls + Skate 613 in support of access to skateboarding for the youth of Ottawa.

In 2018, there were a few changes to the bands structure with Scru Bar leaving the band. Sammy J. Scorpion took his place as co-guitar player with his brother Beej Eh. Nick Nofun moved from the drums to replace Sammy on the bass and Stoney stepped up as the new member, and locally experienced drummer. S-Mike provided added sound on occasion as keyboard player. On 28 March 2019, Pure Grain Audio leaked the song and music video for their new single "Angel". On 18 April 2019, Dine Alone Records announced the date of release of their newest album, Night Mirror, on 13 June 2019, and made available two singles from the album, "Bon Voyage" and "Rolling Stone".

== Live performances ==
The band completed their first tour of Europe in the fall of 2014. In 2015, the New Swears performed at the Ottawa Bluesfest (reviews). They also performed at the Arboretum Festival, Maker Space North, and Ottawa Explosion. In June 2017, under Dine Alone Records, they embarked on a tour across Canada and the US as well as a three-week tour over to Europe in the fall of 2017. The band continued touring Canada through 2018 with a string of shows on their way to an appearance at Elora Riverfest.

The band is well known for their energetic live shows that has traditionally involved confetti cannons, silly string, costumes, wigs and other party props. The band members have been known to assemble into human pyramids on stage without missing a beat.

== Current members ==
- Sammy J. Scorpion – Guitar, Bass Guitar, Vocals
- Beej Eh – Guitar, Bass Guitar, Vocals
- Nick Nofun – Drums, Bass Guitar, Vocals
- Stoney – Drums, Vocals
- S-Mike – Keyboard

== Discography ==
=== Albums ===
| Title | Date of Release | Label | Format | Studio |
|---|---|---|---|---|
| Night Mirror | 13 June 2019 | Dine Alone Records | 11 tracks – 12" vinyl/digital | Clubhouse Recording |
| Angel | 28 March 2019 | Dine Alone Records | 1 single – digital | Clubhouse Recording |
| Illuminati Knights/Happy Birthday | 20 December 2017 | Dine Alone Records | 2 singles – digital | Meat Locker Recording Studio |
| And the Magic of Horses | 23 June 2017 | Dine Alone Records | 10 tracks – 12" vinyl/digital | Meat Locker Recording Studio |
| New Swears – Brand New Spot/ Sugar Heavy Metal | October 2016 | Dine Alone Records | 7" vinyl/digital | Bova Sound |
| Junkfood Forever, Bedtime Whatever | August 2014 | Dirt Cult Records/ Bachelor Records/ Bruised Tongue Records | 10 tracks – 12" vinyl/digital | Meat Locker Recording Studio |
| Funny Isn't Real | March 2013 | Bachelor Records/ Bruised Tongue Records | 10 tracks – cassette/ 12" vinyl/digital | Funboy Clubhouse |

=== Other ===
- Now That's What I Call Music 666 Vol. II – 24 tracks – Various Artists (New Swears track 10) – Fuzzkill Records, Scotland, Oct 2015.
- Deathcats and New Swears split – 8 tracks – Split tape – Fuzzkill Records, Scotland, 5 December 2014.
- Now That's What I Call Music 666 – 16 tracks – Various Artists (New Swears track 2) – Fuzzkill Records, Scotland, 27 September 2014.
- Satan Loves You – Single Track – Recorded at the Funboy Clubhouse, Ottawa, Ontario, February 2013.
- New Swears/Swollen Eyes Split Tape – 6 tracks – Recorded at the Funboy Clubhouse, Ottawa, Ontario, 7 August 2012.

== See also ==
- Canadian rock
- List of bands from Canada
