= Forcefield (album) =

Studio album by Tokyo Police Club
- Released: March 24, 2014
- Genre: Indie rock, indie pop, post-punk revival
- Length: 33:24
- Label: Mom + Pop, Memphis Industries, Dine Alone
- Producer: Doug Boehm and David Monks

Tokyo Police Club chronology
Ten Songs, Ten Years, Ten Days (2011)	Forcefield (2014)	Melon Collie and the Infinite Radness: Part One (2016)

Forcefield is the third studio album released by the Canadian band Tokyo Police Club on March 24, 2014 through Mom + Pop in North America and Memphis Industries in the UK/Europe.

== Critical reception ==
Professional ratings
Aggregate scores
Source	Rating
Metacritic	69/100
Review scores
Source	Rating
Alternative Press	4/5 stars
Consequence of Sound	C−
Pitchfork	(6.4/10)

At Alternative Press, Bree Davies rated the album four stars out of five, writing that the release "makes good on being more than just a referential record" on which it "doesn't feel like enough of a good thing."

== Track listing ==
All tracks are written by Monks, Wright, Hook, and Alsop.

Standard edition
No.	Title	Writer(s)	Length
1.	"Argentina (Parts I, II, III)"	Greg Alsop; Josh Hook; Dave Monks; Graham Wright	8:32
2.	"Hot Tonight"	Alsop; Hook; Monks; Wright; Tim Pagnotta	3:05
3.	"Miserable"	Alsop; Hook; Monks; Wright	2:46
4.	"Gonna Be Ready"	Alsop; Hook; Monks; Wright	2:53
5.	"Beaches"	Alsop; Hook; Monks; Wright	3:20
6.	"Toy Guns"	Alsop; Hook; Monks; Wright; Mark Needham	3:11
7.	"Tunnel Vision"	Alsop; Hook; Monks; Wright	3:02
8.	"Through the Wire"	Alsop; Hook; Monks; Wright; Needham	2:53
9.	"Feel the Effect"	Alsop; Hook; Monks; Wright	3:42
Total length:			33:24

UK Limited edition bonus EP (from 2011's 10x10x10)
No.	Title	Original Artist	Length
1.	"Southside feat. Morgan Kibby from M83"	Moby feat. Gwen Stefani	3:24
2.	"Long Distance Call"	Phoenix	2:52
3.	"Little Sister feat Orianthi"	Queens of the Stone Age	3:05
4.	"Under Control"	The Strokes	3:57
5.	"Since U Been Gone"	Kelly Clarkson	3:12

== Personnel ==
- Dave Monks – producer, songwriter, musician
- Graham Wright – songwriter, musician
- Josh Hooks – songwriter, musician
- Greg Alsop – songwriter, musician
- Doug Boehm – producer, engineer
- Mark Needham – mixing, additional production, songwriting (tracks: 6, 8)
- Tim Pagnotta – songwriting (track: 2)
- Chris Stringer – additional production
- Blackbear – additional production (tracks: 6,8)
- Jared Hirshland – engineer
- Jason Dufour – engineer
- Jeff Pelletier – engineer
- Will Brierre – assistant mixing
- Luke McCutcheon – artwork
- Oscar Saragossi – artwork
- Stuart Pearce – artwork
- Trevor Wheatley – artwork
