= Glass Towers =

- Origin: Alstonville, New South Wales, Australia
- Genres: Indie rock, post-punk, alternative rock
- Years active: 2008–2016, 2020
- Labels: Hub The Label; Inertia; Dine Alone Records (North America); Thistime Records (Japan); Sony
- Past members: Benjamin Hannam; Cameron Holdstock; Daniel Muszynski; Sam Speck

Glass Towers were an Australian indie rock band based in Sydney. The original lineup of lead vocalist and guitarist Benjamin Hannam, bassist Cameron Holdstock, drummer Daniel Muszynski and guitarist Sam Speck met and formed in a music class at Alstonville High School in 2008. Glass Towers' debut album "Halcyon Days" was released in Australia and New Zealand on 5 July 2013, and released in the United States on 17 June 2014. Halcyon Days was met with highly positive reviews including a 4 out of 5 and "Album of the Week" rating from Drum Media, a coveted Triple J Feature Album slot and earned the band nominations at the 2014 Rolling Stone Australia Awards for Single of the Year and Best New Talent. "Halcyon Days" debuted at 42 on the ARIA Album Chart.

The band was signed in Australia to Hub The Label/Inertia. In North America to Dine Alone and in Japan they are signed to Thistime Records.

== History ==
The band was formed in the summer of 2008 around the bedroom recording project of Benjamin Hannam alongside Cameron Holdstock, Sam Speck and Daniel Muszynski. Each of the band members attended the same high school and had been in different bands together throughout their schooling. In 2009 after having only played a couple of shows the band were asked to play Splendour in the Grass. They were given the opening slot of the festival playing the mainstage on 22 July.

During 2010 the band had songs featured on the ABC's Triple J Unearthed program, and were announced as finalists in the 2010 JJJ Unearthed High Competition. In July 2010 they recorded their debut EP at Studios 301 in Byron Bay with producer Wayne Connolly and mixer Paul Mckercher. This was released on 26 August 2011 titled "What We Were, When We Were".

In February 2012 the band released "Jumanji", the first single off their then unreleased second EP "Collarbone Jungle". The song was immediately added to high rotation on Triple J staying in the top 20 most played on Triple J chart for several months and peaking as the fourth most played track on Triple J for the week ending 25 February 2012.

The band released their second EP "Collarbone Jungle" on 28 September 2012 to much local critical acclaim with second single "Tonight" receiving a high amount of rotation on Triple J.

The band's third single 'Halcyon' was released in June and has received a heavy amount of rotation on Triple J.

The band supported The Kooks and Maximo Park on their respective 2013 Australian tours before playing The Great Escape Festival in Brighton, UK as well as touring the UK and Japan in May.

The band recorded their debut album "Halcyon Days" with producer Jean-Paul Fung (Last Dinosaurs) which was released in Australia and New Zealand on 5 July 2013. The album was awarded the coveted Triple J Feature Album spot for the week beginning 1 July 2013. Rolling Stone Magazine gave the album a 4 out of 5 review and proclaimed them a "Band To Watch". The album debuted at no.42 on the ARIA album chart.

In August 2013 the band embarked on a sold out national headline tour in support of their debut album Halcyon Days. The band were main support for Metric on their November 2013 tour of Australia.

The band were nominated for two Rolling Stone Australia 2014 Awards for Single of the Year and Best New Talent.

On 17 June 2014 they released their debut album "Halcyon Days" in North America and the rest of the world through Dine Alone Records. This was preceded by a tour of North America which included performances at SXSW.

The band's social pages have not been updated since 2015 hinting at a hiatus or possible break up.

In June 2020 the band's Facebook posted short clips of new music slated for an August 2020 release.

The band has toured both nationally and internationally including shows in the United Kingdom, United States, Canada and Japan. Played festivals such as Splendour in the Grass, The Great Escape, South by Southwest and shared the stage with artists such as The Kooks, Hall & Oates, Metronomy, Metric, Tame Impala, Pajama Club, The Cribs, Atlas Genius, Birds of Tokyo, Maxïmo Park, Bluejuice and Cloud Control.

== Discography ==
=== Studio albums ===
Year	Title	Label
2013	Halcyon Days	Hub The Label/Inertia, Thistime Records

Year	Title	Label
2014	Halcyon Days	Dine Alone Records

=== EPs ===
Year	Title	Label
2011	What We Were, When We Were	Sony Music Entertainment Australia
2012	Collarbone Jungle	Hub The Label/Inertia, Thistime Records
2014	Collarbone Jungle	Dine Alone Records

=== Singles ===
Year	Single	Album
2012	"Jumanji"	Collarbone Jungle, Halcyon Days
2012	"Tonight"	Collarbone Jungle, Halcyon Days
2013	"Halcyon"	Halcyon Days
2014	"Griffin"	Halcyon Days
