= Bruised Tongue =

Bruised Tongue is an independent record label based out of Ottawa, Ontario. The label primarily releases local and underground Canadian music. Bruised Tongue was founded by Craig Proulx and Pierre Richardson in 2009. Most of the labels' output is released on niche formats, such as: cassette and lathe-cut records.

The label releases a free, monthly newsletter called Small Talk, to document the local scene and upcoming shows taking place in Ottawa. Bruised Tongue is also host to many local concerts in the Ottawa region.

Label signees Boyhood and Shearing Pinx, have received national media attention and have undertaken US and Canada-wide tours. Labelmates New Swears toured Europe in 2014.
