= Edwin Raphael =

Emirati musical artist

- Birth name: Edwin Raphael
- Origin: Dubai, United Arab Emirates, Kerala, India, Montreal, Quebec, Canada
- Genres: Indie folk
- Occupation: Singer-songwriter
- Instrument(s): Vocals, guitar, piano, synths
- Years active: 2015-present
- Labels: Dine Alone Records, Favourite Library
- Members: Jacob Liutkus: Collin Steinz; Niki Thay
- Website: https://edwinraphael.com

Edwin Raphael is an Indian indie folk musician based in Montreal, Quebec, Canada. Raphael moved to Montreal to study at Concordia University from Dubai in 2013.

He released his debut EP, Ocean Walk in 2015, which was followed by Cold Nights in 2017. Raphael released his first full-length album, Will You Think of Me Later? in 2019. His third EP, Staring at Ceilings was released in February 2021 with Dine Alone Records, featuring production efforts from Marcus Paquin, Jacob Liutkus, Andreas Koliakoudakis, and Ishan Parashar.

Edwin began touring in 2022 in support of release from his upcoming album Warm Terracotta which included a headlining Eastern Canadian tour as well as opening slots with Palace, The Franklin Electric, and a performance at Osheaga Festival in the summer of 2022. Raphael's music video for his single, "Have You Been Told?" premiered on Complex on March 15, 2022.

In 2022 Edwin Raphael started his own record label, Favourite Library, inspired by secret shows he would curate from his Montreal home to host his independent releases, Ocean Walk, Cold Nights, and Will You Think of Me Later?

In early 2023, Edwin Raphael released his third album, Warm Terracotta on February 17, 2023, via Dine Alone Records, alongside an interactive website, Warm Terracotta World. In support of Warm Terracotta, Edwin Raphael spent the majority of 2023 on tour across the U.S. and Canada in support of Teo, Overcoats, Jaguar Sun, The Franklin Electric, Palace, and Blanco White.

== Discography ==
=== Albums ===
- 2019: Will You Think of Me Later?
- 2023: Warm Terracotta
- 2024: Will You Think of Me Later? (Recurring Dream)

=== Extended Plays ===
- 2015: Ocean Walk
- 2017: Cold Nights
- 2021: Staring at Ceilings
