= Ukula =

- Categories: Arts and culture
- Frequency: Quarterly
- Founder: Kevin Renton; Graeme Maclean
- Founded: 2004
- Final issue: 2008
- Based in: Toronto, Ontario, Canada
- Language: English

UKULA Magazine was an independent arts and culture quarterly founded in 2004, based in Toronto, Ontario, Canada. It was created by co-founders Kevin Renton and Graeme Maclean, who first started out DJing under the now well known UKULA moniker at the city's Andy Poolhall in 2002. Copies of UKULA were to be found throughout the cities of Toronto, Montreal and New York City. Plans were underway to extend full distribution to include London and Edinburgh, though limited distribution was available in these two cities.

In addition to publishing its glossy magazine, UKULA also had event planning and arts/culture consultancy departments catering to local bands and haute couture fashion houses interested in promoting their brand.

Leah Rumack, writing for The Globe and Mail, described the store as the "ground zero for all things impossibly cool in music, books and fashion".

== History ==
After a year in Toronto, Renton and Maclean relocated to Montreal in 2003, where they continued their series of popular DJ nights. A year later, the first issue of UKULA Magazine hit the streets, a slim staple-bound 32 page paperbacked-sized volume that included interviews with then up-and-coming bands Arcade Fire and Kasabian. By the third issue, the magazine had evolved into a vibrant, glossy (with an average length of just over 100 pages), professionally bound magazine, with content about film, literature, travel and fashion.

Renton and Maclean returned to Toronto in August 2006, and opened the UKULA boutique on 492 College St. A multi-purpose venue that could be converted for stage concerts and parties, the storefront featured a street-level lounge-style cafe, and sold books, magazines, CDs, and clothing. The magazine offices were located in the building's basement.

Events at the UKULA store included the Canadian book launch of Stephen Hall's The Raw Shark Texts, as well as concert performances by Born Ruffians and The Coast. On November 5, 2005, the UKULA Bright Lights Festival in Toronto's Distillery District featured bands such as Elbow, The Duke Spirit, Stirling, The Call Up and the Meligrove Band.

The 2007 Virgin Festival Afterparty hosted at UKULA featured a performance by The Cinematics, and attracted members of Metric, Smashing Pumpkins and The Killers. The magazine and its storefront and website all folded in 2008.
