= Clear Plastic Masks =

American rock band

Clear Plastic Masks is a rock and roll band fronted by Andrew Katz, an actor-turned-singer born and raised in Detroit. Katz moved to New York to study theater at SUNY Purchase. In order to pursue his acting career in Manhattan, like most artists, he had to work several jobs to make ends meet.

While working at a moving company, Katz met his bandmates - Dominican Republic-born drummer Charles Garmendia, guitarist/keyboard player Matt Menold, and bassist Eduardo DuQuesne - and Clear Plastic Masks was formed. They developed a devoted fanbase in their neighborhood of Bed-Stuy, Brooklyn, playing at local performance art venue and antique coffee shop/bar Goodbye Blue Monday on Broadway. An opportunity arose to record their debut album with Andrija Tokic (Alabama Shakes, Benjamin Booker, Hurray for the Riff Raff) in Nashville, TN at The Bomb Shelter. The band went down to record and never moved back. "It's holy land to so many musicians throughout the world. And that tradition is uniquely American and ... amazing. And it informs the whole rock and roll scene."

NPR's Ann Powers said of their debut album, "Being There," "Katz's vocals are wry and slightly theatrical, recalling both Lou Reed and the Strokes's Julian Casablancas, and the band's Stones-ish rock is showy while still hitting hard and direct." Since then, the band has supported Alabama Shakes, Cage the Elephant, White Denim, City and Colour and Houndmouth - to name a few.
