= Champ (album) =

Studio album by Tokyo Police Club
- Released: June 8, 2010
- Studios: Sunset Sound Yogurt Factory & Kingsize Soundlabs (Los Angeles)
- Genres: Indie rock, alternative rock, heartland rock
- Length: 35:35
- Label: Mom + Pop Music
- Producer: Rob Schnapf

Tokyo Police Club chronology
Elephant Shell (2008)	Champ (2010)	Ten Songs, Ten Years, Ten Days (2011)

Singles from Champ
- 1. "Breakneck Speed" Released: March 2010; 2. "Wait Up (Boots of Danger)" Released: May 2010; 3. "Bambi" Released: 2010

Champ is the second studio album by Tokyo Police Club that was released on June 8, 2010. Champ is the band's second studio album, after the release of Elephant Shell in 2008. Tokyo Police Club released the album's first single, "Breakneck Speed" for free download on their website on March 26, 2010. The next singles released off the album were "Wait Up (Boots of Danger)" followed by "Gone".

== Reception ==
Professional ratings
Aggregate scores
Source	Rating
Metacritic	(71/100)
Review scores
Source	Rating
AllMusic	2.5/5 stars
Alternative Press	(80/100)
BLARE Magazine	4/5 stars
onethirtybpm	(75%)
Pitchfork Media	(7.6/10)
Slant Magazine	3/5 stars
TORO	2.5/5 stars
TorontoMusicScene	3/5 stars
SPIN Magazine	3/5 stars
Robert Christgau	A−

As with their debut EP, A Lesson In Crime, Champ was met with a mixed to positive press response, being lauded for their upbeat consistency from one album to the next. Slant Magazine gave it 3/5 stars, calling the band "smart guys with ambitions to be more than another forgotten blog band". Similarly Rolling Stone gave them 3.5/5 stars, praising the way they fused "light-speed guitars with ebullient melodies", saying, "Rarely has crafting such high-velocity guitar pop seemed so easy."

== Track listing ==
All songs by Monks, Wright, Hook, and Alsop.

Standard edition
No.	Title	Length
1.	"Favourite Food"	3:55
2.	"Favourite Colour"	2:38
3.	"Breakneck Speed"	3:44
4.	"Wait Up (Boots of Danger)"	3:08
5.	"Bambi"	2:44
6.	"End of a Spark"	3:37
7.	"Hands Reversed"	3:19
8.	"Gone"	3:04
9.	"Big Difference"	2:57
10.	"Not Sick"	2:56
11.	"Frankenstein"	3:29
Total length:		35:38

US iTunes Bonus
No.	Title	Length
12.	"First Date Kit (feat. Born Ruffians)"	2:35
Total length:		38:13

10th Anniversary edition (Digital)
No.	Title	Length
1.	"Favourite Food"	3:55
2.	"Favourite Colour"	2:38
3.	"Breakneck Speed"	3:44
4.	"Wait Up (Boots of Danger)"	3:08
5.	"Bambi"	2:44
6.	"End of a Spark"	3:37
7.	"Hands Reversed"	3:19
8.	"Gone"	3:04
9.	"Big Difference"	2:57
10.	"Not Sick"	2:56
11.	"Frankenstein"	3:29
12.	"Hundred Dollar Day"	3:53
13.	"Bambi (Acoustic)"
14.	"Gone (Matt & Kim Remix)"	2:08
15.	"I'm On Your Side (Demo)"
16.	"Breakneck Speed (Demo)"
17.	"Polka Breakneck (Interlude)"
18.	"Wait Up (Passion Pit Remix)"
19.	"Wait Up (Dom Remix)"
20.	"Breakneck Speed (Andy Rourke Remix)"
21.	"Favourite Color (Bad Biz Remix)"
22.	"Once I Was The Keeper"
23.	"First Date Kit (Born Ruffians + Tokyo Police Club)"	2:35
24.	"Young Vincent Price"
Total length:		N/A

10th Anniversary edition (Vinyl)
No.	Title	Length
1.	"Favourite Food"	3:55
2.	"Favourite Colour"	2:38
3.	"Breakneck Speed"	3:44
4.	"Wait Up (Boots of Danger)"	3:08
5.	"Bambi"	2:44
6.	"End of a Spark"	3:37
7.	"Hands Reversed"	3:19
8.	"Gone"	3:04
9.	"Big Difference"	2:57
10.	"Not Sick"	2:56
11.	"Frankenstein"	3:29
Total length:		35:38

10th Anniversary edition (Vinyl – Bonus 7")
No.	Title	Length
1.	"Hundred Dollar Bill"	3:53
2.	"Bambi (Acoustic)"
Total length:		N/A

== Personnel ==
Tokyo Police Club

- Dave Monks – songwriting, musician
- Graham Wright – songwriting, musician
- Josh Hook – songwriting, musician
- Greg Alsop – songwriting, musician

Technical

- Rob Schnapf – producer, mix engineer
- Doug Boehm – engineer, mix engineer
- Chris Szczech – assistant mix engineer
- Clinton Welander – assistant engineer
- Chris Claypool – assistant engineer
- Zac Carper – assistant engineer
- Alan Yoshida – mastering
- Chris Zane – additional production (track 1)
- Dean Marino – additional engineering (track 11)
- Jay Sadlowski – additional engineering (track 11)

Art and management

- Rich Cohen – management
- Nous Vous – design and art direction
- Tom Jackson – photography
