= Elephant Shell =

2008 studio album by Tokyo Police Club

Studio album by Tokyo Police Club
- Released: April 22, 2008
- Recorded: December 18, 2007
- Studio: Chemical Sound (Toronto)
- Genre: Indie rock; post-punk revival
- Length: 28:04
- Label: Saddle Creek
- Producer: Jon Drew; Peter Katis; Chris Zane; Tokyo Police Club

Tokyo Police Club chronology
| Smith EP (2007) | Elephant Shell (2008) | Champ (2010) |

Singles from Elephant Shell
- 1. "Your English Is Good" Released: July 2007; 2. "Tessellate" Released: April 2008; 3. "In a Cave" Released: June 2008

Elephant Shell is the debut studio album by Canadian indie rock band Tokyo Police Club. It was released in the United States, Canada and Australia on April 22, 2008, by Saddle Creek Records, and in the United Kingdom and Continental Europe on May 5, 2008. "In a Cave", "Juno", and "Tessellate" have been posted on the band's official MySpace.

The album was leaked on the internet on March 7, 2008. In response to the leak, Saddle Creek Records offered the album as a high-quality MP3 download for $9.00 on their website. The iTunes Store pre-released the album on March 25. Starting April 25, MTV Canada streamed the album free online (The Leak).

The album release party was held at the Bowery Ballroom in New York, with guests Smoosh and The Meligrove Band.

Professional ratings
Review scores
| Source | Rating |
|---|---|
| AllMusic | link |
| Billboard | link |
| Robert Christgau | A− |
| NME | (7/10) link |
| Pitchfork Media | (6.3/10) link |
| Rolling Stone | 3/5 stars |

== Chart performance ==
The album debuted at #1 on the Billboard Top Heatseekers charts in the United States, and at #10 in the Canadian album chart.

== Track listing ==
Standard edition
| No. | Title | Length |
|---|---|---|
| 1. | "Centennial" | 1:54 |
| 2. | "In a Cave" | 2:49 |
| 3. | "Graves" | 2:36 |
| 4. | "Juno" | 2:15 |
| 5. | "Tessellate" | 2:39 |
| 6. | "Sixties Remake" | 2:05 |
| 7. | "The Harrowing Adventures Of..." | 2:51 |
| 8. | "Nursery, Academy" | 2:27 |
| 9. | "Your English Is Good" | 3:13 |
| 10. | "Listen to the Math" | 2:58 |
| 11. | "The Baskervilles" | 2:17 |
| Total length: | | 28:04 |

Remix bonus disk
| No. | Title | Length |
|---|---|---|
| 1. | "Centennial (Remix by Dntel)" | 4:37 |
| 2. | "Tessellate (Remix by Tom Campesinos!)" | 4:16 |
| 3. | "Nursery, Academy (Remix by Flowers Forever)" | 2:38 |
| 4. | "Listen to the Math (Remix by The Good Life)" | 3:18 |
| 5. | "Tessellate (Remix by Field Music)" | 3:28 |

Japan bonus disk
| No. | Title | Length |
|---|---|---|
| 1. | "Centennial (Remix by Dntel)" | 4:37 |
| 2. | "Tessellate (Remix by Tom Campesinos!)" | 4:16 |
| 3. | "Nursery, Academy (Remix by Flowers Forever)" | 2:38 |
| 4. | "Listen to the Math (Remix by The Good Life)" | 3:18 |
| 5. | "Tessellate (Remix by Field Music)" | 3:28 |
| 6. | "Friends Of P" | 2:45 |
| 7. | "New New Song" | 2:04 |
| 8. | "Tessellate (Acoustic Version)" | 3:09 |
| 9. | "Graves (Acoustic Version)" | 1:58 |

== Free downloads ==
The songs "In a Cave" and "Juno" were both released as free downloads before the actual release of the album.

== Personnel ==
- Tokyo Police Club – songwriters, musicians, co-producers
  - Greg Alsop
  - Josh Hook
  - Dave Monks
  - Graham Wright
- Alex Aldi – additional engineering
- Greg Giorgio – additional engineering
- Dean Marino – assistant engineer
- Jay Sadlowski – assistant engineer
- Chris Zane – producer (tracks: 9)
- Jon Drew – producer (tracks: 1–6, 8, 10, 11)
- Peter Katis – mix engineer, producer (tracks: 7), additional production (tracks: 3, 4, 6, 9, 10)
- Doug Van Sloun – mastering engineer
- Jadon Ulrich – art direction
- Rich Cohen – management
