= Jon Drew =

Canadian musician and producer

- Born: Jon Drew
- Origin: Toronto, Ontario, Canada
- Genre: Punk rock
- Occupation: Record producer
- Instrument: Drums
- Years active: 2004–present

Jon Drew is a Canadian record producer and recording engineer based in Toronto, Ontario. He has produced the albums of Polaris Music Prize winning band Fucked Up and Juno Award nominated Tokyo Police Club. He has also worked on the albums of Canadian bands the Stars, Attack in Black, July Talk, Single Mothers, Metz, Diemonds and Arkells.

He is also the drummer for the band Uncut as well as All Eyes West featuring Jeff Dean on guitar.

== Discography (selection) ==
p - producer, m - mixed, e - engineered, ma - mastered

=== Albums ===
- Alexisonfire - Dog's Blood (p/m/ma)
- Arkells - Jackson Square (p/m/e)
- Bastard Child Death Cult - Year Zero (p)
- Career Suicide - Attempted Suicide (p/m/e/ma)
- Dinosaur Bones - My Divider (p/m/ma/e)
- Few and Far Between - We're All Safe (p/m/ma)
- The Flowers of Hell - O (e)
- Fucked Up - The Chemistry of Common Life (p/m/e) (This album won the 2009 Polaris Music Prize)
- I, the Magician- The Lonely Illusionist
- Fucked Up - Hidden World (p/m/e)
- Magneta Lane - The Constant Lover (EP) (p/m/ma)
- Magneta Lane - Gambling with God (p/m/ma)
- Noise By Numbers - Over Leavitt (p)
- Single Mothers - Our Pleasure (m/ma)
- Tokyo Police Club - A Lesson In Crime EP (p/m/ma)
- Tokyo Police Club - Elephant Shell (p)
- Uncut - Modern Currencies (p)
- Winter Gloves - About A Girl (p/e)

=== Singles ===
- Bang Bang - "1977" / "Mystery" (p)
- Fire and Neon - "Good Intentions" (p)
- Fucked Up - "Crooked Head" (p/m/ma)
- Fucked Up - "No Epiphany" (p/m/e)
- Fucked Up - "Year Of The Rat" / "First Born" (p/m)
- Metz - "Ripped On The Fence / Dry Up" (m)
- Metz - "Soft Whiteout / Lump Sums" (m)
- Sandman Viper Command - "Rough Love" (p)
- Tokyo Police Club - "In A Cave" (P)
- Turbogeist - "Alien Girl" (e)
