= A Lesson in Crime =

EP by Tokyo Police Club
- Released: April 18, 2006
- Recorded: 2005
- Studio: Signal to Noise (Toronto)
- Genre: Indie rock
- Length: 16:23
- Label: Paper Bag Records
- Producer: Jon Drew

Tokyo Police Club chronology
| A Lesson in Crime EP (2006) | Smith EP (2007) |

Singles from A Lesson in Crime
- 1. "Nature of the Experiment" Released: 2006; 2. "Cheer It On" Released: 2007; 3. "Citizens of Tomorrow" Released: 2007

Professional ratings
Review scores
| Source | Rating |
|---|---|
| Robert Christgau | A− |
| Pitchfork Media | 7.9/10 |
| Rolling Stone | 3.5/5 stars |

A Lesson in Crime is an EP by Tokyo Police Club released April 18, 2006. It reached #194 on the Canadian album charts. The single "Nature of the Experiment" is featured as the opening to the Comedy Central sketch comedy show Nick Swardson's Pretend Time.

== Reception ==
A Lesson in Crime received positive reviews from music critics. The EP was praised for its concise, high-energy songs and the band’s distinctive sound. The track “Nature of the Experiment” became a breakout single and was featured in commercials and on television, helping build the band’s international profile.

== Track listing ==
All songs written by Alsop, Hooks, Monks, and Wright.

Standard edition
| No. | Title | Length |
|---|---|---|
| 1. | "Cheer It On" | 1:59 |
| 2. | "Nature of the Experiment" | 2:02 |
| 3. | "Citizens of Tomorrow" | 2:44 |
| 4. | "Shoulders & Arms" | 2:39 |
| 5. | "If It Works" | 2:04 |
| 6. | "Be Good" | 2:05 |
| 7. | "La Ferrassie" | 2:50 |
| Total length: | | 17:38 |

UK Edition (Vinyl/CD)
| No. | Title | Length |
|---|---|---|
| 1. | "Cut Cut Paste" (Bonus Track) | 1:44 |
| Total length: | | 19:22 |

10th Anniversary Edition (Digital)
| No. | Title | Length |
|---|---|---|
| 1. | "Cheer It On" | 1:59 |
| 2. | "Nature of the Experiment" | 2:02 |
| 3. | "Citizens of Tomorrow" | 2:44 |
| 4. | "Shoulders & Arms" | 2:39 |
| 5. | "If It Works" | 2:04 |
| 6. | "Cut Cut Paste" | 1:44 |
| 7. | "Be Good" | 2:05 |
| 8. | "La Ferrassie" | 2:50 |
| 9. | "Cheer It On" (Demo Version) | 1:55 |
| 10. | "Nature of the Experiment" (Demo Version) | 2:01 |
| 11. | "Be Good" (Demo Version) | 2:04 |
| 12. | "Box" (Demo Version) | 2:13 |
| 13. | "Cut Cut Paste" (Demo Version) | 1:55 |
| 14. | "Your English is Good" (Demo Version) | 3:21 |
| 15. | "Happy Valentines Day" (Demo Version) | 2:11 |
| 16. | "Algebra Love Scene" (Demo Version) | 2:46 |
| 17. | "Nature of the Experiment" (Demo Alternative Version) | 2:03 |
| Total length: | | 38:46 |

10th Anniversary Edition (Vinyl/CD)
| No. | Title | Length |
|---|---|---|
| 1. | "Cheer It On" | 1:59 |
| 2. | "Nature of the Experiment" | 2:02 |
| 3. | "Citizens of Tomorrow" | 2:44 |
| 4. | "Shoulders & Arms" | 2:39 |
| 5. | "If It Works" | 2:04 |
| 6. | "Be Good" | 2:05 |
| 7. | "La Ferrassie" | 2:50 |
| 8. | "Box" | 2:33 |
| 9. | "Cut Cut Paste" | 1:46 |
| 10. | "A Lesson in Crime" | 3:30 |
| 11. | "Be Good (RAC remix)" | 2:45 |
| Total length: | | 28:17 |

== Personnel ==
- Greg Alsop – drums
- Joshua Hook – guitar
- Graham Wright – keyboards, vocals
- David Monks – vocals, bass guitar
- Jon Drew – producer, engineering, tambourine
- Rich Cohen – management
- Geoff Wilson – artwork

== Charts ==
| Chart (2007) | Peak position |
|---|---|
| UK Albums (OCC) | 139 |
