= Tokyo Police Club =

Canadian indie rock band (2005–2024)

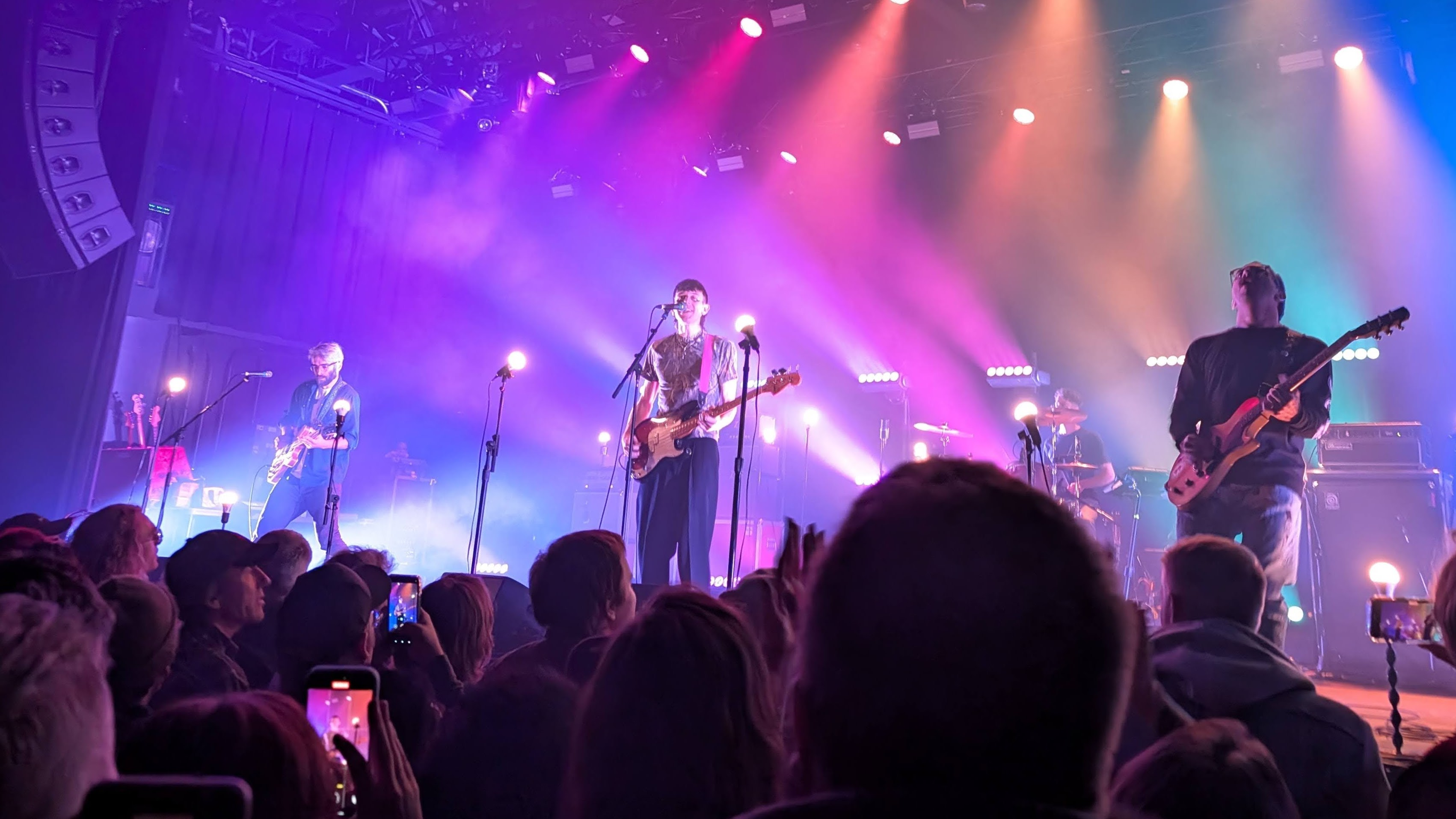
- Tokyo Police Club performing at History in November 2024. From left to right: Josh Hook, David Monks, Greg Alsop, Graham Wright

Background information
- Origin: Newmarket, Ontario, Canada
- Genres: Indie rock, post-punk revival, alternative rock
- Years active: 2005–2024
- Labels: Universal Music Canada; Paper Bag; Memphis Industries; Saddle Creek; Dew Process; Mom + Pop Music; Dine Alone (Canada)
- Spinoffs: Anyway Gang; Netherwilds; Girlfriend Material
- Past members: David Monks; Graham Wright; Josh Hook; Greg Alsop
- Website: tokyopoliceclub.com

Tokyo Police Club was an indie rock band from Newmarket, Ontario, Canada. Founded in 2005, it consisted of vocalist and bassist Dave Monks, keyboardist Graham Wright, guitarist Josh Hook, and drummer Greg Alsop. The band found early success with their 2006 debut EP A Lesson in Crime, which they followed with several popular releases including the albums Elephant Shell and Champ in 2008 and 2010, respectively. During the 2010s, they released three other studio albums. Among other nominations, the band had been twice nominated for the Juno Award for Alternative Album of the Year, in 2011 for Champ and in 2019 for TPC.

They disbanded at the end of November 2024 following a final tour.

== History ==
=== 2005–2007: Formation and early years ===
David Monks (born January 21, 1987), Graham Wright (born February 16, 1987), Josh Hook (born May 11, 1987), and Greg Alsop (born March 20, 1985) grew up and attended school together in Newmarket, Ontario. In high school, the four played in a band called Suburbia which eventually disbanded. In 2004, the group informally came together again to form Tokyo Police Club; the name of the band comes from a 2000s-era online Band Name Generator.

Early on, the band played some small shows in the Toronto area. Tokyo Police Club were asked to play in the Pop Montreal festival, and soon after they signed with Toronto label Paper Bag Records; Monks and Alsop dropped out of college to become professional musicians.

The band released its debut EP, A Lesson in Crime, in 2006 on Paper Bag Records. The recording was less than seventeen minutes long, and some of the songs were quite short. That year they appeared at Edgefest and the inaugural Osheaga Festival.

The Smith EP was released in 2007. During a July show in Omaha, Nebraska, the band signed a deal with Saddle Creek Records which would release their debut LP. The single "Your English Is Good" was released in July and later included on their album Elephant Shell. That year the band performed at Coachella, Lollapalooza, Bumbershoot, the Glastonbury Festival, and the Reading and Leeds Festival.

=== 2008–2012: Debut record and successful follow-up ===
In 2008, Tokyo Police Club released their first album, Elephant Shell, first via the US iTunes Store on March 25, 2008, and then on their new label Saddle Creek in April in North America, and in May in the U.K. and Continental Europe via Memphis Industries. In the same year, the band played the Roskilde Festival, the Rock am Ring-Festival, and Street Scene. In the fall, they played on the last six weeks of Weezer's Troublemaker Tour along with Angels and Airwaves.

In 2010, the band played the Bonnaroo Music Festival. They also played at San Francisco's 2010 Outside Lands Music and Arts Festival. Their second full-length album, Champ, was released in June; it was produced by Rob Schnapf. That fall the album appeared on the !Earshot National Top 50 Chart.

On March 27, 2011, Tokyo Police Club performed their single "Bambi" at the 40th Juno Awards in Toronto. In June, the video for "Wait Up (Boots of Danger)" was nominated as best indie video of the year by MuchMusic. The video was directed by Mike Juneau and Kyle McCreight, and produced by Jesse Ewles and Chris Cunningham. In 2011, the band also released 10 Days. 10 Covers. 10 Years., a project in which they recorded and released a new cover song from each of the previous 10 years, from 2001 to 2010.

In December 2011, the band performed an unreleased song "Beaches" at a live show. In 2012, they joined Foster the People on the North American portion of their Torches tour along with Kimbra. While continuing to work with the band, Wright also hosted programming on CBC Radio 3.

=== 2013–2018: Forcefield and TPC ===
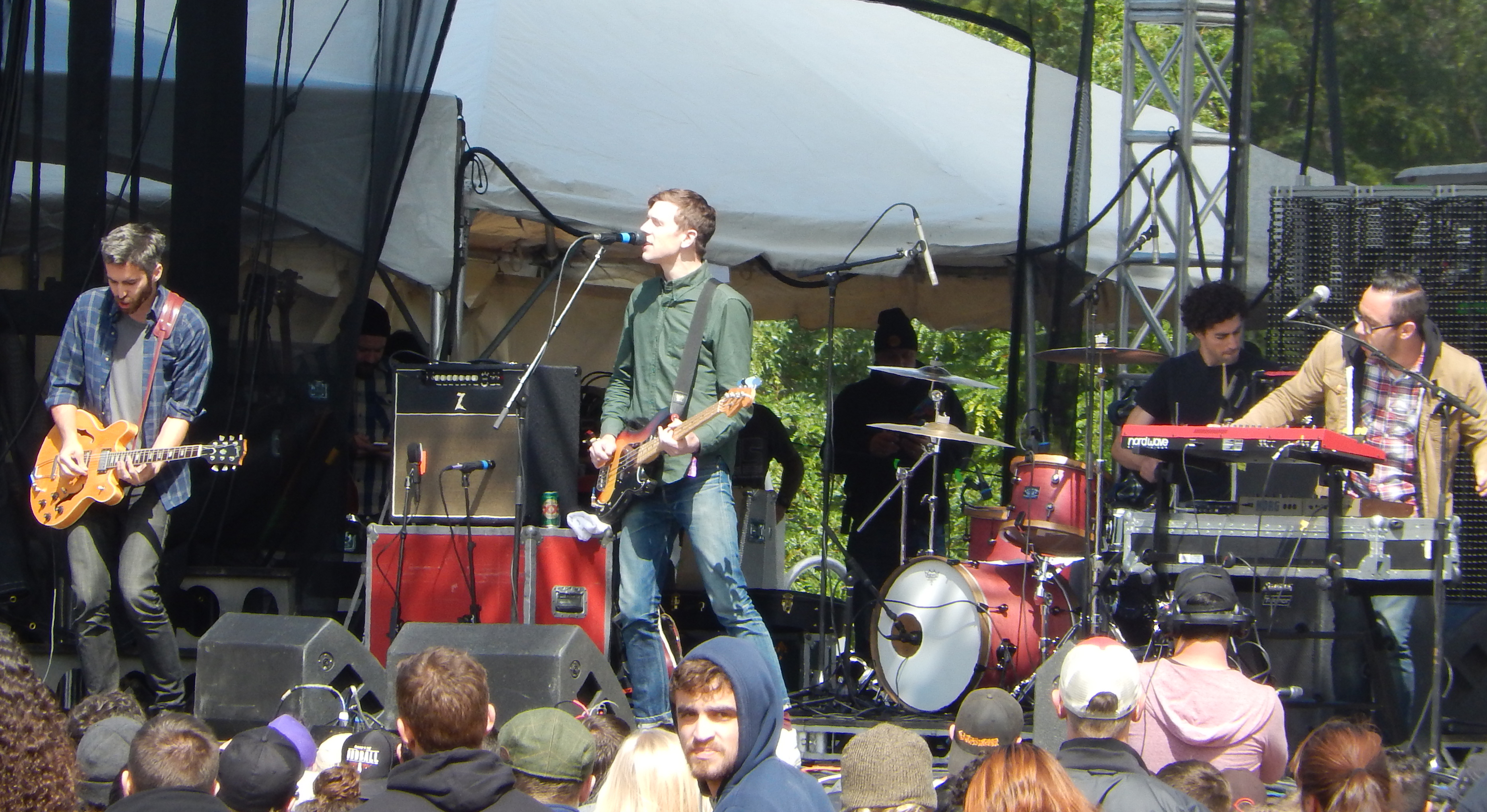
Tokyo Police Club performing at Riot Fest in 2014.

After a prolific period, the band was relatively quiet from late 2012 until December 2013, when the band debuted a nine-minute lyric video for "Argentina (Pts. I, II, and III)" on YouTube. Both "Beaches" and "Argentina" are on their album Forcefield which was released March 24, 2014. In July the band performed at the 2014 Calgary Stampede in Calgary, Alberta. The band also recorded two songs for the Daytrotter Sessions, which were released online.

In 2016, the band released their Melon Collie and the Infinite Radness project, consisting of two companions EPs titled Part One and Part Two. The two were later combined and formally released as a full length LP of the same name. The EPs celebrated a more spontaneous recording ethos, similar to their early albums. With this same celebratory nature, the band also released an expanded tenth anniversary edition of A Lesson in Crime that year.

Tokyo Police Club continued to record in 2018 in preparation for a fourth album. They released TPC on October 5, 2018 and received a Juno nomination for Alternative Album of the Year. A companion EP titled TPC DLX was released in October 2020, made up of tracks from the TPC recording sessions and acoustic versions of songs.

=== 2020–2024: Reissues and disbandment ===
In December 2020, the band announced that they would be releasing a special tenth anniversary edition of their album Champ, slated for release in March 2021. With this announcement, the band released the single "Hundred Dollar Day."

In March 2023, the band announced that they would be releasing a special fifteenth anniversary edition of their debut album Elephant Shell, slated for release on 5 May 2023.

On January 23, 2024, the band announced their disbandment. They performed their final four shows at History in Toronto in November 2024. Prior to their final performances, the band released their final single, "Just A Scratch" / "Catch Me If You Can", on March 12 that year.

== Television ==
On April 19, 2007, Tokyo Police Club made their first US television performance on the Late Show with David Letterman. They played their single "Nature of the Experiment", along with a tambourine accompaniment by the CBS Orchestra. A year later the band made a second appearance on the Late Show, performing the lead single "Tessellate" off their debut LP Elephant Shell.

On November 16, 2008, they appeared on the television show Desperate Housewives in the episode "City on Fire" as "Cold Splash", a band competing in a battle-of-the-bands contest. They performed "In A Cave" from their album Elephant Shell. A month later they played "Your English is Good" on The Late Late Show with Craig Ferguson on CBS. On June 28, 2010, they made their third appearance on the Late Show with David Letterman, performing the single "Wait Up (Boots of Danger)" off of their second album, Champ.

== Band members ==
- Dave Monks – lead vocals, bass guitar, guitar
- Graham Wright – keyboards, guitar, vocals
- Josh Hook – guitar, vocals
- Greg Alsop – drums, percussion

== Discography ==
- Elephant Shell (2008)
- Champ (2010)
- Forcefield (2014)
- TPC (2018)

== Accolades ==
Year	Association	Category	Nominated work	Result	Ref.
2007	MTVu Woodie Awards	Best Emerging Artist	Tokyo Police Club	Nominated	
2007	MuchMusic Video Awards	Best Independent Video	"Cheer It On"	Nominated	
2008	Juno Awards	Video of the Year	"Cheer It On"	Nominated	
2009	Juno Awards	Group of the Year	Tokyo Police Club	Nominated	
2011	Juno Awards	Alternative Album of the Year	Champ	Nominated	
2011	MuchMusic Video Awards	Indie Video of the Year	"Wait Up (Boots of Danger)"	Nominated	
2014	MuchMusic Video Awards	Rock/Alternative Video of the Year	"Hot Tonight"	Nominated	
2014	MuchMusic Video Awards	Post-Production of the Year	"Hot Tonight"	Nominated	
2019	Juno Awards	Alternative Album of the Year	TPC	Nominated	
