= Dine Alone Records =

Canadian and American independent record label

- Founded: 2005; 21 years ago
- Founder: Joel Carriere
- Distributors: RED Distribution (US); Universal Music Group (CAN)
- Genre: Rock, alternative rock, indie rock, folk, post-hardcore
- Country of origin: Canada, United States
- Location: Toronto, Nashville, Los Angeles
- Official website: dinealonerecords.com

Dine Alone Records is a Canadian and American record label, founded in St. Catharines and Toronto by Joel Carriere. The label is now based in Toronto, Nashville and Los Angeles.

== History ==
Dine Alone was born out of founder Joel Carriere's home in St. Catharines, Ontario. After years working various positions in the Canadian music industry and building his own cultural website and promotional company, Carriere launched Dine Alone Records in 2005. With a name drawn from the songs "Dine Alone" by the post-hardcore band Quicksand, and a set of founders who had ties to the North American heavy music scene, Dine Alone worked with artists such as The Fullblast, Johnny Truant, City and Colour and Attack in Black.

Dine Alone quickly expanded its roster from the early days of City and Colour, Arkells, and Bedouin Soundclash to over 50 national and international artists. Dine Alone Records was named the number one independent label and the number four label overall in Canada in Nielsen Soundscan's 2013 year-end report. In 2013, the label expanded into Nashville and furthermore, to Los Angeles in 2014.

In 2015, Dine Alone Records launched a series of events and projects to celebrate their tenth anniversary, including 'Wax on Wheels' – the label's official mobile record shop. Dine Alone Records was named Canadian Independent of the Year at The Canadian Music Industry Awards for the second year in a row in May 2015.

== Current roster ==
- ...And You Will Know Us by the Trail of Dead
- Aero Flynn
- Alexisonfire
- Amityfalls
- The Amazing
- The Apache Relay
- At the Drive-In
- Attack in Black
- Brendan Benson
- BRONCHO
- Bryan Bryne
- Vanessa Carlton
- Cerebral Ballzy
- City and Colour
- Sam Coffey & The Iron Lungs
- The Cult
- The Dandy Warhols
- DBOY
- Dashboard Confessional
- Delta Spirit
- Dinosaur Bones
- Dune Rats
- The Dirty Nil
- The Dodos
- DZ Deathrays
- Edwin Raphael
- FIDLAR
- Field Report
- Fine Points
- Fly Golden Eagle
- FREEMAN
- Gateway Drugs
- Hannah Georgas
- The Get Up Kids
- Glass Towers
- Grade
- Noah Gundersen
- HBS
- Headstones
- Heartless Bastards
- Helicon Blue
- Hey Marseilles
- Hey Rosetta!
- High Ends
- The Howlin' Brothers
- Ivan & Alyosha
- JEFF the Brotherhood
- The Jezabels
- Jimmy Eat World
- Kopecky
- Langhorne Slim & The Law
- Legend of the Seagullmen
- Lieutenant
- Lucius
- The Lumineers
- Marilyn Manson
- James Vincent McMorrow
- Miami Horror
- Moneen
- Monk (hardcore punk band)
- Dave Monks
- Monster Truck
- Music Band
- NOBRO
- Kate Nash
- New Swears
- Brendan Philip
- Phox
- Pickwick
- Quicksand
- Chuck Ragan
- Respire
- Rumba Shaker
- Saints & Sinners
- Say Anything
- Say Yes
- Walter Schreifels
- The Sheepdogs
- Shovels & Rope
- Single Mothers
- Sleepy Sun
- Sol Cat
- Solids
- Spain
- Sparta
- Spanish Gold
- Spencer Burton
- Streets of Laredo (band)
- Swervedriver
- Tokyo Police Club
- Twin Forks
- Violent Soho
- We Are Scientists
- The Weeks
- Wintersleep
- Wool
- The Wytches
- You+Me
- Yukon Blonde
- Zeahorse

== Alumni ==
- Arkells
- Augustines
- Bedouin Soundclash
- Billy Bragg
- Black Lungs
- Brant Bjork
- Casey Baker and the Buffalo Sinners
- Caveman
- Chains of Love
- Children Collide
- Clear Plastic Masks
- Cloud Control
- Cunter
- Daniel Romano
- Data Romance
- Deer Tick
- Dispatch
- Doldrums
- Eagulls
- Elliot Moss
- Empire Air
- Gaz Coombes
- Great Bloomers
- Hacienda
- Hanni El Khatib
- Hot Hot Heat
- Johnny Truant
- k-os
- Library Voices
- Little Comets
- Mockingbird Wish Me Luck
- Marilyn Manson
- Neon Indian
- Parlovr
- Seaway
- Simone Felice
- Sleepercar
- Songs from a Room
- The Civil Wars
- The End
- The Fullblast
- The Golden Dogs
- The Pains of Being Pure at Heart
- We Barbarians
- Words Left Unsaid

== Affiliated companies ==
Dine Alone has founded three sister labels, based out of the label's Toronto headquarters. In 2013, Dine Alone launched New Damage Records – a developing aggressive rock label (Canadian home to Cancer Bats, Counterparts, KEN mode, Silverstein, Misery Signals, Heart Attack Kids, Architects etc.). 2014 saw the unveiling of Haven Sounds – a hip-hop/EDM and remix label, which signed L.A.-based MOORS, featuring hip-hop artist and actor Lakeith Stanfield. In 2018, Dallas Green (Alexisonfire/City and Colour), launched Still Records as an "imprint" of Dine Alone.

Dine Alone Foods was co-founded with Jordan Hastings (Alexisonfire, Say Yes) and features sauces made in Canada. The line features three flavours, including a classic Southern Blues BBQ sauce, a sweet smoky Northern Soul chipotle BBQ sauce and a spicy Rock N' Roll hot sauce. The sauces are currently distributed through Whole Foods and featured on menus of Toronto eateries such as Let's Be Frank, Boots and Bourbon, The Dog and Bear, and the Hogtown Smoke food truck.

== Partnerships and services ==
In 2012, Dine Alone partnered with Warner Music Canada to provide marketing services for The Sheepdogs' self-titled album. Additionally, Dine Alone has partnered with Sony Music Canada to provide marketing services in Canada for You & Me's debut album, rose ave..

Dine Alone has partnered with Volu.me in order to act as the first to employ iBeacon technology in a concert setting.

== See also ==
- List of record labels
