= Cancer Bats discography =

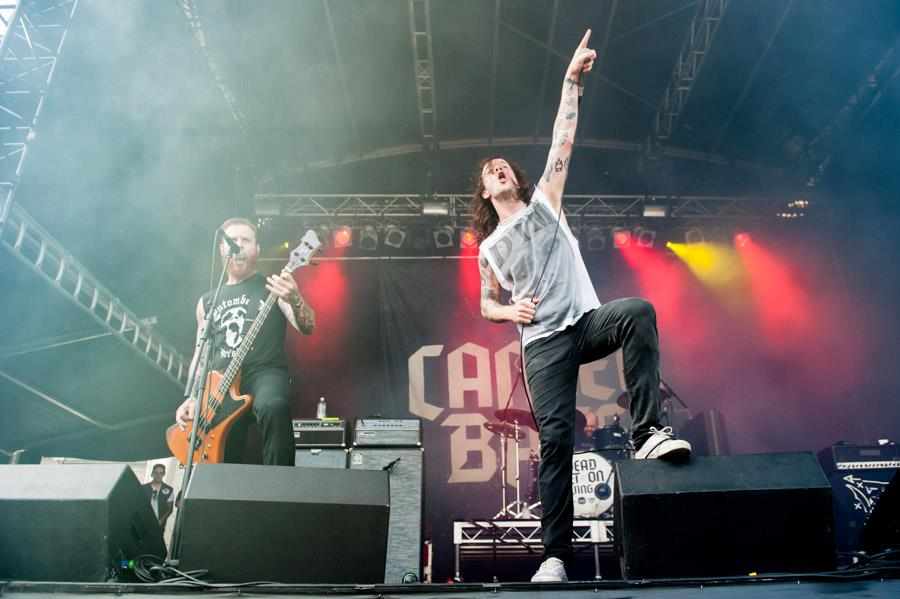
- (left to right) Jaye R. Schwarzer, Liam Cormier and Mike Peters (back) at a Cancer Bats show in Sydney in February 2013
- Studio albums: 8
- Extended plays: 10
- Music videos: 37

Cancer Bats is a Canadian hardcore punk band from Toronto, Ontario. They have released eight studio albums and seven extended plays. The band is composed of vocalist Liam Cormier, guitarist Jackson Landry and bassist Jaye R. Schwarzer.

== Albums ==
=== Studio albums ===
Year	Album details	Peak chart positions	
Year	Album details	CAN	UK
2006	Birthing the Giant: Released: September 5, 2006; Label: Distort; Formats: CD, vinyl record, download	—	—
2008	Hail Destroyer: Released: April 22, 2008; Label: Distort; Formats: CD, vinyl record, download	—	—
2010	Bears, Mayors, Scraps & Bones: Released: April 13, 2010; Label: Distort; Formats: CD, vinyl record, download	—	58
2012	Dead Set on Living: Released: April 24, 2012; Label: Distort; Formats: CD, vinyl record, download	80	49
2015	Searching for Zero: Released: March 10, 2015; Label: Metal Blade Records; Formats: CD, vinyl record, download		60
2018	The Spark That Moves: Released: April 20, 2018; Label: New Damage Records, Bat Skull Records; Formats: CD, vinyl record, download	-	-
2022	Psychic Jailbreak: Released: April 15, 2022; Label: New Damage Records, Bat Skull Records; Formats: CD, vinyl record, download	-	90
2026	Give Me Dirt: Released August 7, 2026; Label: Marshall Records; Formats: CD, vinyl record, download	2	2
"—" denotes a title that did not chart.

=== EPs ===
- 2005: Cancer Bats
- 2007: This Is Hell / Cancer Bats 7"
- 2009: Cancer Bats / Rolo Tomassi
- 2009: Tour EP
- 2010: Sabotage EP
- 2011: Cancer Bats / Black Lungs
- 2013: Bat Sabbath EP
- 2019: New Damage Records Switcheroo Vol 1. : Cancer Bats / Single Mothers
- 2020: You'll Never Break Us // Separation Sessions, Vol. 1
- 2021: You'll Never Break Us // Separation Sessions, Vol. 2

== Music videos ==
Cancer Bats often incorporate their friends such as Alexisonfire in their music videos. In the French Immersion and Pneumonia Hawk videos the band parodied some of Dallas Green's City and Colour songs. Fellow Alexisonfire members George Pettit and Wade MacNeil performed guest vocals on the tracks "Pneumonia Hawk" and "Deathsmarch" respectively, and also appeared in the videos for the songs that included their respective contributions.

Album/Release	Track	Release Year
Birthing the Giant	Hundred Grand Canyon	2006
Birthing the Giant	French Immersion	2006
Birthing the Giant	Pneumonia Hawk	2007
Hail Destroyer	Hail Destroyer	2008
Hail Destroyer	Lucifer's Rocking Chair	2008
Hail Destroyer	Deathsmarch	2009
Bears, Mayors, Scraps & Bones	Sabotage	2010
Bears, Mayors, Scraps & Bones	Scared to Death	2010
Bears, Mayors, Scraps & Bones	Dead Wrong	2010
Dead Set on Living	Old Blood	2012
Dead Set on Living	Road Sick	2012
Dead Set on Living	Bricks and Mortar	2012
Dead Set on Living	R.A.T.S	2012
Searching for Zero	Satellites	2014
Searching for Zero	True Zero	2014
Searching for Zero	Arsenic in the Year of the Snake	2014
Searching for Zero	Beelzebub	2015
The Spark That Moves	Brightest Days	2018
The Spark That Moves	Winterpeg	2018
The Spark That Moves	Bed of Nails	2018
The Spark That Moves	Heads Will Roll	2018
The Spark That Moves	Fear Will Kill Us All	2018
The Spark That Moves	We Run Free	2018
The Spark That Moves	Rattlesnake	2018
The Spark That Moves	Headwound	2018
The Spark That Moves	Space and Time	2018
The Spark That Moves	Can't Sleep	2018
The Spark That Moves	Gatekeeper	2018
Inside Out (single)	Inside Out	2019
Psychic Jailbreak	Psychic Jailbreak	2022
Psychic Jailbreak	Lonely Bong	2022
Psychic Jailbreak	Radiate	2022
Psychic Jailbreak	Friday Night	2023
Psychic Jailbreak	Hammering On	2023
Psychic Jailbreak	Weird Punx	2023
Backstab the Rat Race (single)	Backstab the Rat Race	2025
Give Me Dirt	Stay Stuck	2026
Give Me Dirt	Long Tooth	2026
Give Me Dirt	Give Me Dirt	2026

Members of Cancer Bats have also appeared in music videos by other bands, including '"Hey, It's Your Funeral Mama"' and "Waterwings" by Alexisonfire, "Vices" by Silverstein, "Chelsea Smile" by Bring Me the Horizon and "St. Andrew's" by Bedouin Soundclash.
