= Liam Cormier =

Canadian musician (born 1980)

- Cormier photographed by Derek Bremner for Kerrang! 2026

Background information
- Born: February 9, 1980 (age 46)
- Genres: Hardcore punk, sludge metal, Southern rock, metalcore, groove metal
- Occupations: Musician, singer, songwriter
- Instruments: Vocals, drums, percussion
- Labels: Hassle, Distort, Metal Blade, Good Fight, Bat Skull, Marshall
- Member of: Cancer Bats
- Formerly of: AxeWound, Black Lungs

Liam Cormier (born February 9, 1980) is a Canadian musician from Toronto, Ontario. He is the lead singer for Canadian hardcore punk band Cancer Bats. He is also the lead singer for the supergroup AxeWound. He is a vegetarian and lives a straight edge lifestyle. He also runs his own clothing brand called Treadwell Clothing.

== Cancer Bats ==
Liam Cormier is the lead singer for the Canadian hardcore punk band Cancer Bats. The band is composed of Cormier, guitarist Jackson Landry and bassist Jaye R. Schwarzer. Cormier has been in the band since 2004 and is the only remaining original member. They have released eight studio albums and seven extended plays.

== AxeWound ==
Cormier is the lead singer for the supergroup AxeWound. The band started in 2012. The band consists of Cormier on lead vocals, Matthew Tuck of Bullet for My Valentine on guitar and backing vocals, Mike Kingswood of Glamour of the Kill on guitar, Joe Copcutt of Zoax playing bass and Jason Bowld of Pitchshifter and, later, Bullet for My Valentine on drums.

== Discography ==
Cancer Bats

Cancer Bats discography

- Birthing the Giant (2006)
- Hail Destroyer (2008)
- Bears, Mayors, Scraps & Bones (2010)
- Dead Set on Living (2012)
- Searching for Zero (2015)
- The Spark That Moves (2018)
- Psychic Jailbreak (2022)
- Give Me Dirt (2026)

AxeWound

- Vultures

Liam Cormier

- Modern Decay (2019)
