= SHVPES =

English metalcore band

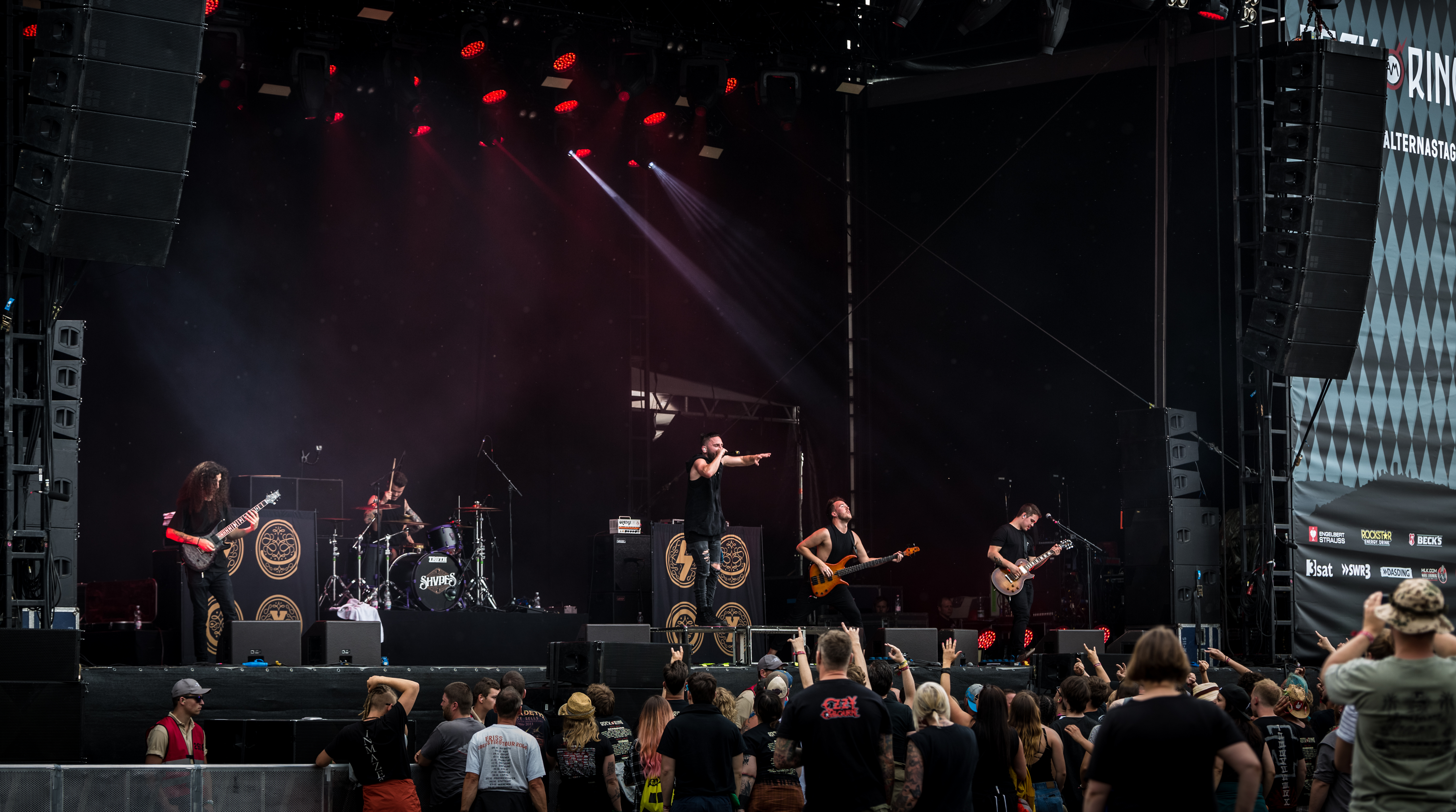
- Shvpes at Rock am Ring (2017)

Background information
- Also known as: Cytota (2009–2015)
- Origin: Birmingham, England
- Genres: Alternative metal; rap metal; nu metal; metalcore; post-hardcore
- Years active: 2009–2020
- Labels: Spinefarm; Search and Destroy
- Past members: Joby Fitzgerald; Griffin Dickinson; Ryan Hamilton; Youssef Ashraf; Grant Leo Knight; Harry Jennings; Oliver Pike
- Website: shvpes.com

SHVPES ("Shapes") were an English metalcore band from Birmingham. Originally formed in 2009 under the name Cytota, they changed their name in 2015.

They were signed to Spinefarm Records/Search and Destroy Records. In 2016 they released their debut record, Pain. Joy. Ecstasy. Despair, followed by Greater Than in 2018.

Their band's sound experiments by mixing metalcore with aggressive alternative hard rock and touches of hip-hop. The band's frontman, Griffin Dickinson is a son of Iron Maiden frontman Bruce Dickinson, and the brother of Rise to Remain and As Lions frontman Austin Dickinson.

== History ==
=== Cytota and The Prosecutor EP (2009–2014) ===
On 31 October 2009 drummer Harry Jennings and vocalist Joby Fitzgerald met at a concert in London. Shortly afterwards they decided to form a band, along with guitarists Ryan Hamilton and Youssef Ashraf and bass player Oliver Pike, and formed Cytota. In March 2012 they toured in the UK supporting Rise to Remain, Adept and Malefice. On 10 September 2012, they released an EP, The Prosecutor, through independent record label Believe Revolt. The EP was produced by Jim Pinder and Carl Brown. The artwork was created by Bring Me the Horizon's singer Oli Sykes.

In 2013 they performed at the Vans Warped Tour in London and they joined Chiodos and The Color Morale on their UK tour.

In 2014 they supported Memphis May Fire and Funeral for a Friend in the UK. On 23 July, the band split with vocalist Joby Fitzgerald, stating that "we wanted to take the band in different directions, and it simply wasn't working anymore." In October 2014 the band announced that they had found a new frontman, Griffin Dickinson who is the son of Iron Maiden's Bruce Dickinson). About the new line up, Jennings declared: "It feels like being reborn again with the addition of Griffin, already he's bringing so much to the band and it's going to be an exciting future." The following month, they embarked on a tour across Europe and the UK in support of Crossfaith.

=== SHVPES and Pain. Joy. Ecstasy. Despair (2015–2017) ===
At the beginning of 2015 the band decided to change their name to SHVPES. Dickinson explained the origin of the name: "It is a metaphor my mum used to use when I was a bit of a problem child going from one school to the next. She taught me about adapting shape to my environment – there are certain shapes people accept of you, whether that be a triangle or a circle or a rhomboid." They had previously released their first song, "SHAPES", on 20 November 2014.

In February 2015 SHVPES joined 36 Crazyfists and Fightstar on their UK tours. On 20 May 2015 they released the track "State of Mine", with an accompanying video directed by Storm + Shelter. In December 2015 they supported Nothing More in a few shows in the UK.

At the end of March 2016, SHVPES announced that bassist Oliver Pike had decided to leave the band. He was replaced by Grant Leo Knight.

In May 2016 they toured with Miss May I and We Came as Romans in the UK, and in August performed at Download Festival.

On 14 October 2016, they released their first full-length album, Pain. Joy. Ecstasy. Despair. They teamed with producers Jim Pinder and Carl Brown. The record was preceded by the singles "God Warrior", "False Teeth", "Two Minutes of Hate" and "Skin and Bones". The title track was released on 30 January 2017.

Dickinson revealed the themes of the record: "As a concept, this album is about finding the beauty in whatever situation you're in. Your ability to feel pain/to feel despair is ultimately what allows you to embrace the feeling of joy or ecstasy. It's like yin & yang. Pain. Joy. Ecstasy. Despair gave me a platform to expel 24 years' worth of frustration and turn it into something positive; something I can be proud of and something, I hope, the listener can find solace in."

Shortly after the release, SHVPES started their first UK headline tour, with EMP!RE and Press To MECO.

In February 2017 the band was announced as main support act for Trivium on their tour in Europe and the UK, along with Sikth. They spent most of 2017 on tour, supporting While She Sleeps and appearing at the main festivals in Europe during the summer, including Slam Dunk and Hellfest.

=== Greater Than and breakup (2018–2020) ===
In May 2018, the band participated to an Avenged Sevenfold tribute album, "Hail to the King", exclusively available through Metal Hammer. They covered the song "Scream".

Mixtape 1 was released on 6 July 2018 and included single "Undertones" and "Calloused Hands", as well as "I'm Stuck" and "War". The three other mixtapes, set for separate releases, have been merged into the final result, the sophomore record, Greater Than, that was released on 9 November 2018. The album was preceded by single "Afterlife", and it features Matt Heafy of Trivium on "Rain". It was produced by Jim Pinder and Carl Brown.

In November 2018, they joined Bullet for My Valentine, Nothing More and Of Mice & Men for two shows in the UK, before embarking on a headlining tour. In January/February 2019, they toured in the UK.

During spring 2019, they played in the US supporting We Came as Romans and Crown the Empire, and performed at different festivals including Welcome to Rockville and Epicenter.

On 10 July 2020, the band stated on their social media that they have disbanded and left on good terms with the rest of the band.

== Band members ==
Final lineup

- Youssef Ashraf – rhythm guitar, backing vocals (2009–2020)
- Harry Jennings – drums (2009–2020)
- Ryan Hamilton – lead guitar, backing vocals (2012–2020)
- Griffin Dickinson – lead vocals (2014–2020)
- Grant Leo Knight – bass (2017–2020)

Former

- Joby Fitzgerald – lead vocals (2009–2014)
- Oliver Pike – bass (2009–2016)

== Discography ==
=== Studio albums ===
- Pain. Joy. Ecstasy. Despair (2016)
- Greater Than (2018)

=== EPs ===
- The Prosecutor as Cytota (2012)
