= Decade (Live at the El Mocambo) =

Live album by Silverstein
- Released: June 8, 2010
- Recorded: March 18–21, 2010 at El Mocambo, Toronto, Ontario, Canada
- Genre: Post-hardcore; emo
- Label: Victory

Silverstein chronology
A Shipwreck in the Sand (2009)	Decade (Live at the El Mocambo) (2010)	Transitions (2010)

Singles from Decade
- 1. "Smile in Your Sleep" / "Born Dead" Released: June 1, 2010

Decade (Live at the El Mocambo) is the first live album by the Canadian post-Hardcore band Silverstein, released on June 8, 2010 on Victory. (Note: U.S. Victory VR589)

== Background and release ==
On April 23, 2010, the band announced through their official Facebook page that Decade (Live at the El Mocambo) was to be released on June 8, 2010. It was filmed and recorded during March 18–21, 2010 during the band's 10th anniversary shows. The show was filmed by Robby Starbuck, who had previously directed the music videos of "Vices" and "American Dream" for the band. Four cameras were used, presumably limited by the size of the venue.

Each day the band played one of their four full-length albums in its entirety to celebrate 10 years as a band. They announced that Decade would be 'the best of' the performances. On May 5, 2010, the album was made available for pre-order with a T-shirt, poster, and signed laminate. They also announced that it would be over 2 hours long, contain 22 tracks, unseen backstage footage, and every music video including the upcoming video for "American Dream".

Decade Singles was released on June 1 and contained "Smile in Your Sleep" and "Born Dead" (featuring Scott Wade).

The album was mixed by Cameron Webb. (Note: Webb previously worked with the band producing Discovering the Waterfront (2005) and A Shipwreck in the Sand (2009). He would later work with the band, mixing Transitions (2010) and Rescue (2011).) This was their last release on Victory Records before signing with Hopeless Records later that year.

== Track listing ==
=== CD ===
Night One (recorded on March 18, 2010)
No.	Title	Length
1.	"Smashed into Pieces"	3:53
2.	"Red Light Pledge"	3:42
3.	"The Weak and the Wounded"	3:03
4.	"When Broken Is Easily Fixed" (featuring Kyle Bishop of Grade and The Black Maria)	4:18

Night Two (recorded on March 19, 2010)
No.	Title	Length
5.	"Your Sword versus My Dagger"	3:04
6.	"Fist Wrapped in Blood"	2:59
7.	"Discovering the Waterfront"	4:09
8.	"Defend You"	3:37
9.	"Call It Karma"	4:01
10.	"Bleeds No More"	5:21

Night Three (recorded on March 20, 2010)
No.	Title	Length
11.	"Sound of the Sun"	3:12
12.	"If You Could See into My Soul"	3:48
13.	"My Disaster"	3:40
14.	"Still Dreaming"	3:40
15.	"Here Today, Gone Tomorrow"	3:21
16.	"Already Dead"	3:14
17.	"Smile in Your Sleep"	3:30

Night Four (recorded on March 21, 2010)
No.	Title	Length
18.	"Vices"	3:19
19.	"American Dream"	3:05
20.	"Born Dead" (featuring Scott Wade of Comeback Kid)	2:53
21.	"I Am the Arsonist"	3:15
22.	"My Heroine" (acoustic version)	4:01

=== DVD ===
Night One (recorded on March 18, 2010)
No.	Title	Length
1.	"Smashed into Piece"
2.	"Red Light Pledge"
3.	"The Weak and the Wounded"

Night Two (recorded on March 19, 2010)
No.	Title	Length
4.	"Your Sword versus My Dagger"
5.	"Discovering the Waterfront"
6.	"Call It Karma"
7.	"Bleeds No More"

Night Three (recorded on March 20, 2010)
No.	Title	Length
8.	"My Disaster"
9.	"Still Dreaming"
10.	"Here Today, Gone Tomorrow"
11.	"Already Dead"
12.	"Smile in Your Sleep"

Night Four (recorded on March 21, 2010)
No.	Title	Length
13.	"Vices"
14.	"American Dream"
15.	"Born Dead" (featuring Scott Wade of Comeback Kid)
16.	"I Am the Arsonist"
17.	"My Heroine" (acoustic version)

Music videos
No.	Title	Length
1.	"American Dream"	3:07
2.	"You're All I Have"	3:33
3.	"Vices" (featuring Liam Cormier of Cancer Bats)	3:19
4.	"Still Dreaming"	4:10
5.	"If You Could See into My Soul"	4:07
6.	"My Heroine"	3:30
7.	"Discovering the Waterfront"	4:11
8.	"Smile in Your Sleep"	3:30
9.	"Smashed into Pieces"	3:42
10.	"Giving Up"	4:14

== Personnel ==
Personnel per booklet.

Silverstein

- Shane Told – lead vocals
- Paul Koehler – drums
- Josh Bradford – rhythm guitar
- Neil Boshart – lead guitar
- Billy Hamilton – bass, vocals

DVD Production

- Robby Starbuck – director, producer, editor, coloured
- Greg Ephraim – director of photography
- Chris Cunningham – line producer
- Nick Rybacki – assistant editor
- Robby Starbuck, Greg Ephraim, Jamie Shaw, Ryan Williams – camera operators
- Jag Tanna – live audio recording
- Scott Komer – additional engineering
- Cameron Webb – mixing
- Alan Douches – mastering
- Eric Richter – DVD production
- Sean Sutton – DVD authoring

Silverstein 10th Anniversary Crew

- Richard Fernandes – tour management
- Kevin Kennaley – stage manager, guitar tech
- Paul-Marc Rousseau – drum tech, guitar tech
- Nicole Nechiporchik, Carly Richardson – merchandise

Artwork

- Kyle Crawford – cover art illustration
- Doublej – layout
- Josh Doll – collage
- Scott Wade – show poster
- Mark Luciani – l;ive and promo photography
- Gordie Ball – past photo
- Adam Elmakias – present photo
