= Burning Bridges =

Burning Bridges or Burnin' Bridges may refer to:

== Music ==
=== Albums ===
- Burning Bridges (Arch Enemy album) or the title song, 1999
- Burning Bridges (Bon Jovi album) or the title song, 2015
- Burning Bridges (Glen Campbell album), 1967
- Burning Bridges (Haste the Day album), 2004
- Burning Bridges (Naked Eyes album) or the title song, 1983
- Burning Bridges, by Jack Scott, or the title song (below), 1964

=== EPs ===
- Burning Bridges (EP) by Ludacris, or the title song, 2014
- Burning Bridges, by Ann Beretta, 1999

=== Songs ===
- "Burning Bridges" (Drake song), 2026
- "Burning Bridges" (Jack Scott song), 1960
- "Burning Bridges" (Pink Floyd song), 1972
- "Burning Bridges" (Status Quo song), 1988
- "Burning Bridges", by Against Me!, 1998
- "Burning Bridges", by Bea Miller from Chapter One: Blue, 2017
- "Burning Bridges", by Collective Soul from Hints Allegations and Things Left Unsaid, 1993
- "Burning Bridges", by Crimson Glory from Transcendence, 1988
- "Burning Bridges", by Delain from Apocalypse & Chill, 2019
- "Burning Bridges", by Emerson, Lake and Palmer from Black Moon, 1992
- "Burning Bridges", by Family from Fearless, 1971
- "Burning Bridges", by Garth Brooks from Ropin' the Wind, 1991
- "Burning Bridges", by Ghost Machine from Hypersensitive, 2006
- "Burning Bridges", by Japan from Gentlemen Take Polaroids, 1980
- "Burning Bridges", by Jason Mraz from Mr. A–Z, 2005
- "Burnin' Bridges", by Jessie James from Jessie James, 2009
- "Burning Bridges", by Kittie from Until the End, 2004
- "Burning Bridges", by k-os from Yes!, 2009
- "Burning Bridges", by Megadeth from The World Needs a Hero, 2001
- "Burning Bridges", by Mest from Mest, 2003
- "Burning Bridges", by Mike Curb and Lalo Schifrin, the theme to the film Kelly's Heroes, 1970
- "Burning Bridges", by OneRepublic from Native, 2013
- "Burning Bridges", by Remy Shand from The Way I Feel, 2002
- "Burning Bridges", by Seventh Day Slumber from Finally Awake, 2007
- "Burning Bridges", by Sigrid from How to Let Go, 2022
- "Burnin' Bridges", by Slaughter from Stick It to Ya, 1990
- "Burning Bridges", by Survivor from Too Hot to Sleep, 1988

== Other media ==
- Burning Bridges (film), a 1928 American silent Western film starring Harry Carey
- Burning Bridges, a 1990 TV movie starring Meredith Baxter
- Burning Bridges, a 1989 novel by Maurice Leitch

== See also ==
- The Burning Bridge, a 2005 Ranger's Apprentice novel by John Flanagan
- The Burning Bridges Tour, a 2003 comedy album by Maria Bamford
- "Bridge Burning", a 2012 song by Foo Fighters
- Bridges Will Burn, a 2010 EP by Rise to Remain
- Bridges Worth Burning, a 2002 album by Kind of Like Spitting
