= Joe Copcutt =

- Born: Joseph Copcutt; 2 August 1988 (age 37); Islington, London, England
- Genres: Hard rock, Metalcore, Groove metal, Heavy Metal
- Occupations: Musician, songwriter
- Instrument: Bass guitar
- Years active: 2006–present
- Labels: Search and Destroy

Joe Copcutt (born 2 August 1988) is an English metal bassist. He is a founding member of Zoax and bassist of AxeWound.

== Early life and career ==
Copcutt was born in Islington, London, England. Copcutt's musical career began when he joined 12 Ton Method in 2006 around the time of leaving the band in 2008 he joined Rise to Remain replacing Theo Tan. Copcutt left Rise to Remain in 2012 along with Pat Lundy. In that same year he joined AxeWound. In 2013 Copcutt formed a new London based band named Zoax with Adam Carroll, Dan Prasad, Doug Wotherspoon & Jon Rogers. In 2018 he joined Carroll in the newly formed The Gore Club.

== Personal life ==
Copcutt is a vegan, he is also a fan of Arsenal F.C.

== Discography ==
=== 12 Ton Method ===
- 2008: The Art of Not Falling EP

=== Rise to Remain ===
- 2008: Becoming One EP
- 2010: Bridges Will Burn EP
- 2011: City of Vultures

=== AxeWound ===
- 2012: Vultures

=== ZOAX ===
- 2014: XIII EP
- 2015: Is Everybody Listening? EP
- 2016: Zoax
