= Jordan Red =

British alternative metal band

- Origin: London, England
- Genres: Alternative metal, hard rock, post-grunge
- Years active: 2020–present
- Members: Daniel Leigh; Dan Baker
- Website: https://www.jordan-red.com

Jordan Red are a British alternative metal band originating from London, England. The band was formed in 2020 by vocalist Daniel Leigh and guitarist Dan Baker, with As Lions members Conor O'Keefe and Dave Fee as touring and session members. In 2022, they self-released their debut album, "Hands That Built The World", which entered the Official Charts, peaking at #14 in Independent Albums Breakers and #16 in the Top 40 Rock and Metal Albums Charts. Subsequently, their single 'Awake' received national airplay on BBC Radio 1 and Planet Rock.

== Members ==
- Daniel Leigh – lead vocals
- Dan Baker – guitar

=== Touring and session members ===
- Conor O'Keefe – bass
- Dave Fee – drums

== Discography ==
=== Albums ===
List of albums, with selected chart positions
Title	Album details	Peak chart positions			
Title	Album details	UK Independent Albums Breakers	UK Rock & Metal Albums	UK Album Downloads	UK Independent Albums
Hands That Built The World	Released: November 11, 2022; Label: Self-released	14	16	25	49

=== Singles ===
- Beautiful Monsters (2020)
- Don't Let The Heavens Fall (2020)
- Hands That Built The World (2020)
- Way Down (2020)
- Freak Show (2021)
- Spilling My Blood (2022)
- Awake (2022)
