= A Shipwreck in the Sand =

Studio album by Silverstein
- Released: March 31, 2009
- Recorded: 2008–2009
- Studios: Metalworks, Mississauga, Ontario
- Genres: Post-hardcore; pop screamo; melodic-hardcore; emo; emo pop; scene music
- Length: 47:15
- Label: Victory
- Producer: Cameron Webb

Silverstein chronology
| Arrivals & Departures (2007) | A Shipwreck in the Sand (2009) | Decade (Live at the El Mocambo) (2010) |

Singles from A Shipwreck in the Sand
- 1. "Vices" Released: March 17, 2009

A Shipwreck in the Sand is the fourth studio album by the Canadian post-hardcore band, Silverstein, released March 31, 2009 through Victory.

Although not as an official member, this marks the first album to feature future guitarist Paul Marc Rousseau (who would later go on to replace guitarist Neil Boshart), providing group vocals, among others. It was their final studio album and second to last release on Victory after completing their four-album contract, with their 10-year anniversary live album, Decade (Live at the El Mocambo) being their last release on the label a year later.

== Background and recording ==
A Shipwreck in the Sand was recorded at Metalworks Studios, in Mississauga, Ontario, Canada, with producer Cameron Webb, who also engineered and mixed it. (Note: Webb previously worked with the band producing Discovering the Waterfront (2005). He would later work with the band, mixing Decade (Live at the El Mocambo) (2010), Transitions (2010) and Rescue (2011).) Silverstein returned to Discovering the Waterfront (2005) producer Cameron Webb, after being disappointed with the recording process of their previous album, Arrivals & Departures (2007), which was produced by Mark Trombino.

Mixing took place at Maple Studios in Santa Ana, California, U.S. Sergio Chavez provided additional engineering, while Kevin Dietz was assistant engineer at Metalworks Studios. The album was mastered by Brian Gardner at Bernie Grundman Mastering.

== Music and lyrics ==
The album features a much heavier sound. With some tracks that are soft, it also has some very heavy tracks and is considered their heaviest album. The album contains influences from post-hardcore, emo, hardcore punk and heavy metal. The album features a conceptual storyline, written by lead vocalist Shane Told. Prior to the release of the album, an official album website was revealed, which told the tale of a vessel which set sail to find resources, and begin a new world, but when no new land is to be found, the crew revolts and turns against their captain.

As time passed by, there was no new land to be found. As the days grew shorter, and the nights grew longer and colder, the crew became more and more skeptical about the captain's vision. Originally passionate and committed, true and faithful, they now began to revolt.

The website also carried the tagline, "Betrayal. Arson. Infidelity. True Love.". The album is divided into four chapters: It Burns Within Us All (tracks 1–3), Liars, Cheaters and Thieves (tracks 4–7), Fight Fire with Fire (tracks 8–10), and Death and Taxes (tracks 11–14). Upon release of the album, it was revealed the story of the ship and its captain was a metaphor of betrayal, similar to that faced by the protagonist in the main storyline. Alongside the main storyline, some songs tackle individual issues, such as "Born Dead", which talks about the problems with the American health system. "The protagonist of the story is sick, terminally ill, and can't get health care," says Told. "That's a big reason for the problems that he's facing in his life." The track, "We Are Not The World" attacks the government and the problems of war. In an interview filmed for the Decade (Live at the El Mocambo) live album, Shane Told states the following;

The concept of the record "The Shipwreck In The Sand" is complicated, and there's a lot of stuff going on. And I like that about it, that it is not obvious and that a lot of people can take something out of it that's their own. The reason I wanted to do a concept record was because of the way the world is right now, with the economy being messed up, people losing jobs and families losing their life savings, and not knowing what they are going to do in the future. Ten years ago, everything was going so well, people were not as concerned and now it's a really scary time. There's a lot of underlying political issues within the record about what governments all over the world are spending money on, what their focus is on. There's also a lot of social issues I wanted to talk about as well; people that watch reality TV and think Cribs is the way their house needs to look or they need to look like people from a Cosmopolitan magazine. There's just so many problems that face society right now and I really wanted to tackle them all. Each song just dives into a different issue; you know the issue of health care right now in America, and how it's so divided when it should be so obvious.

== Release ==
On October 3, 2008, the band posted a demo titled "Broken Stars" online. The song was originally written during the sessions for the band's previous album, Arrivals & Departures. In October and November, the band went on a co-headlining tour of the US with Chiodos. They were supported by Escape the Fate. On January 28, 2009, the album's track listing and artwork was revealed. The following day, the accompanying story to the album's concept was revealed. In February, the band went on a Brazilian tour, followed by a tour of Australia as part of the Soundwave festival in February and March. On March 5, the band posted a clip of new track, titled "Vices". On March 15, they posted a clip of "Born Dead". On March 17, they shot a music video for "Vices" with director Robby Starbuck. On March 19, the band posted a clip of "American Dream".

On March 23, "Vices" was posted on the group's Myspace profile. The following day, the album was made available for streaming on Myspace, before being released on March 31 through Victory Records. (Note: U.S. Victory VR458) A CD/DVD version was also released. (Note: U.S. Victory VR513) In March and April, the band went on a tour of the US alongside Norma Jean, Blessthefall and Before Their Eyes. Norma Jean left the tour in early April and were replaced by A Static Lullaby. Further dates were added, extending the tour into May, prior to an appearance at The Bamboozle and Slam Dunk festivals. In June and July, the band went on performed a handful of shows in Canada and the US. The Canadian dates were played with I Am Committing a Sin and Desperate Union, while the US dates were with Poison the Well, the Sleeping and Oceana. Following this, the band performed two stints on Warped Tour in mid-July and mid-to-late August. In October and November 2009, they embarked on another US tour, with support from Madina Lake, I See Stars and the Word Alive. On May 19, 2010, a music video was released for "American Dream".

== Reception ==
Professional ratings
Review scores
| Source | Rating |
|---|---|
| AbsolutePunk | 77% |
| AllMusic | 3.5/5 stars |
| DecoyMusic.com | 3/5 stars |
| MusicEmissions.com | 4/5 stars |

A Shipwreck in the Sand received mainly positive reviews from music critics and fans alike. It peaked at number thirty three on the Billboard 200 album chart, a position higher than 2005's Discovering the Waterfront, however not reaching the height of its predecessor, Arrivals & Departures.

Daniel Thompson of Music Emissions suggested the album "may very well be the band's best album to date", and praised the diversity of musical styles present on the album, however criticized the repetitiveness of the lyrics stating, "it gets annoying hearing about the same thing in every song". Drew Beringer of AbsolutePunk also gave a mainly positive review, calling it an "enjoyable, catchy album that digs deeper than most bands in its genre", giving the album an overall rating of 77% and saying although "musically, the album doesn’t implement a new sound or direction" it is "a refinement and polishing of the things the band has tried over the years".

== Track listing ==
Chapter One – It Burns Within Us All
| No. | Title | Length |
|---|---|---|
| 1. | "A Great Fire" | 4:00 |
| 2. | "Vices" (featuring Liam Cormier of Cancer Bats) | 3:19 |
| 3. | "Broken Stars" | 3:30 |

Chapter Two – Liars, Cheaters and Thieves
| No. | Title | Length |
|---|---|---|
| 4. | "American Dream" | 3:05 |
| 5. | "Their Lips Sink Ships" | 1:02 |
| 6. | "I Knew I Couldn't Trust You" | 3:29 |
| 7. | "Born Dead" (featuring Scott Wade of Comeback Kid) | 2:51 |

Chapter Three – Fight Fire with Fire
| No. | Title | Length |
|---|---|---|
| 8. | "A Shipwreck in the Sand" | 4:38 |
| 9. | "I Am the Arsonist" | 3:08 |
| 10. | "You're All I Have" | 3:33 |

Chapter Four – Death and Taxes
| No. | Title | Length |
|---|---|---|
| 11. | "We Are Not the World" | 3:21 |
| 12. | "A Hero Loses Everyday" | 3:08 |
| 13. | "The Tide Raises Every Ship" | 0:46 |
| 14. | "The End" (featuring Lights) | 7:25 |
| Total length: | | 47:15 |

Chapter Five – Deluxe edition bonus tracks
| No. | Title | Length |
|---|---|---|
| 15. | "Help!" (The Beatles cover) | 2:17 |
| 16. | "Go Your Own Way" (Fleetwood Mac cover) | 2:30 |
| 17. | "Three Miles Down" (Saves the Day cover) | 1:45 |
| 18. | "Total Bummer" (NOFX cover) | 2:15 |
| 19. | "Broken Stars" (demo) | 3:34 |

== Personnel ==
Personnel per booklet.

Silverstein

- Shane Told – lead vocals
- Paul Koehler – drums
- Neil Boshart – lead guitar
- Josh Bradford – rhythm guitar
- Billy Hamilton – bass guitar

Additional musicians

- Liam Cormier – vocals on "Vices"
- Scott Wade – vocals on "Born Dead"
- Lights – vocals on "The End"
- Anna Jarvis – cello
- I Am Committing a Sin and Silverstein – group vocals

Production

- Cameron Webb – producer, engineer, mixing
- Sergio Chavez – additional engineering
- Kevin Dietz – assistant engineer
- Paul Dickinson – drum technician
- Brian Gardner – mastering
- Martin Wittfooth – artwork
- Jason Link – layout
- Kyle Crawford – logo
- Shane Told, Paul Koehler – art direction
- Vanessa Heins – band photo
- Brooks Reynolds – studio photos

DVD personnel

- Josh Bradford – "making of" camera
- Eric Richter – "making of" editor
- Mark Smith – "soul" montage
- Sean Sutton – DVD authoring
- Kenton Quatman – DVD menu designer

== Charts ==
| Chart (2009) | Peak position |
|---|---|
| Canadian Albums (Nielsen SoundScan) | 40 |
| UK Independent Albums (Official Charts) | 32 |
| UK Rock & Metal Albums (Official Charts) | 37 |
| US Billboard 200 | 33 |
| US Independent Albums (Billboard) | 3 |
| US Top Alternative Albums (Billboard) | 7 |
| US Top Hard Rock Albums (Billboard) | 4 |
| US Top Rock Albums (Billboard) | 10 |
