= Vultures (AxeWound album) =

Studio album by AxeWound
- Released: 1 October 2012
- Recorded: 2011–2012 at Atrium Studios, Cardiff and Nott-In-Pill Studios, Newport
- Genre: Metalcore, groove metal
- Length: 41:35
- Label: Search and Destroy
- Producer: Matt Tuck

Singles from Vultures
- 1. "Post Apocalyptic Party" Released: 1 May 2012; 2. "Cold" Released: 10 August 2012; 3. "Exorchrist" Released: 21 September 2012

Professional ratings
Aggregate scores
Source	Rating
Metacritic	64/100
Review scores
Source	Rating
Artistdirect	5/5 stars
BBC	8/10
Big Cheese	4/5 stars
Hit The Floor	8/10
Kerrang!	4/5 stars
Loudwire	3.5/5 stars
Metal Hammer	8/10
NME	5/10
Ourzone Mag	9/10
Pop Matters	2/10
Q Magazine	8/10
100% ROCK MAGAZINE	9/10

Vultures is the debut album by the British-Canadian supergroup AxeWound, released on 2 October 2012. The first song, "Post Apocalyptic Party", was released on 1 May 2012, when group founder Matt Tuck unveiled the group, which along with the Bullet for My Valentine frontman features Cancer Bats vocalist Liam Cormier, former Glamour of the Kill guitarist Mike Kingswood, ex-Rise to Remain bassist Joe Copcutt and Pitchshifter drummer Jason Bowld. The second song from the album, "Cold", premiered on 29 May. Avenged Sevenfold guitarist Synyster Gates guested on the title track, contributing a guitar solo. The album was produced by Matt Tuck and mixed and mastered by Machine.

== Track listing ==
All lyrics are written by Matt Tuck and Liam Cormier; all music is composed by Matt Tuck and Jason Bowld

Original CD
No.	Title	Length
1.	"Vultures" (featuring Synyster Gates)	3:46
2.	"Post Apocalyptic Party"	4:47
3.	"Victim of the System"	2:41
4.	"Cold"	4:10
5.	"Burn Alive"	4:32
6.	"Exorchrist"	3:48
7.	"Collide"	5:56
8.	"Destroy"	3:34
9.	"Blood Money and Lies"	3:35
10.	"Church of Nothing"	4:46
Total length:		41:35

== Personnel ==
AxeWound

- Matt Tuck – rhythm guitar, vocals, production
- Liam Cormier – lead vocals
- Mike Kingswood – lead guitar
- Joe Copcutt – bass guitar
- Jason Bowld – drums, percussion

Additional personnel

- Synyster Gates – guitar solo on "Vultures"
- Matt Bond – piano, strings on "Collide"
- Martyn "Ginge" Ford – engineering
- Machine – mixing, mastering
