= AxeWound =

British/Canadian metal band

- Origin: United Kingdom; Canada
- Genres: Metalcore; groove metal
- Years active: 2012–2013 (hiatus)
- Labels: Search and Destroy
- Members: Liam Cormier; Matthew Tuck; Mike Kingswood; Joe Copcutt; Jason Bowld

AxeWound is a British-Canadian heavy metal supergroup formed in 2012 comprising lead vocalist Liam Cormier of Cancer Bats, guitarist and co-vocalist Matthew Tuck, and drummer Jason Bowld, both of Bullet for My Valentine, guitarist Mike Kingswood of Glamour of the Kill, bassist Joe Copcutt of Zoax and Rise to Remain.

== History ==
The band was officially unveiled on 1 May, 2012 on the BBC Radio 1 Rock Show along with the premiere of their first single, "Post Apocalyptic Party". That same day, the band was confirmed to sub-headline the Pepsi Max Third Stage at Download Festival 2012, on 8 June. Guitarist and vocalist Matt Tuck announced that Avenged Sevenfold guitarist Synyster Gates would guest on the title track of the band's debut album. On 2 October, 2012, AxeWound's debut album, Vultures, was released and yielded three singles: "Post Apocalyptic Party", "Cold" and "Exorchrist". In August 2013, it was announced that the band was set to start work on their sophomore album. AxeWound went on hiatus later that same year due to the members' commitment to their main projects.

== Band members ==
- Liam Cormier – lead vocals
- Matthew Tuck – rhythm guitar, vocals
- Mike Kingswood – lead guitar
- Joe Copcutt – bass
- Jason Bowld – drums, percussion

== Discography ==
=== Studio albums ===
- Vultures (2012)
