= Greater Than =

Studio album by SHVPES
- Released: 9 November 2018
- Length: 40:41
- Label: Spinefarm, Search and Destroy
- Producer: Jim Pinder/Carl Brown

SHVPES chronology
Pain. Joy. Ecstasy. Despair (2016)	Greater Than (2018)

Singles from Greater Than
- 1. "Undertones" Released: 6 May 2018; 2. "War" Released: 15 June 2018; 3. "Calloused Hands" Released: 27 July 2018; 4. "Afterlife" Released: 8 October 2018; 5. "Rain" Released: 15 November 2018

Greater Than is the second and final studio album by the English metalcore band SHVPES. It was released on 9 November 2018 through Spinefarm Records and Search and Destroy Records and it was produced by Jim Pinder and Carl Brown.

== Background ==
While spending most of 2017 on tour, SHVPES started working on new music. The initial idea was to release four different mixtapes, each one with three or four songs in it.

Harry Jennings explained: "We have three mix-tapes coming out, the fourth one will consist of all three and then four brand new ones on the end of that, with some surprises in there. Mix-tape one is coming out July 6th, which has our new single, ‘Undertones,’ on it. A few months later we'll release mix-tape two, then after that three and then it'll all come out the start of next year. We just want to keep it fresh, constantly dripping out new content, new music. We were so proud of what we'd done, we didn't just want to release it all at once and then let it fade all into the distance."

During an interview with HEAVY Magazine, Griffin Dickinson stated that the record "is all heavy music – whether that’s heavy in terms of a hip-hop/urban street kind of sound to it – it’s still heavy in that respect but then we’ve got the heavier side of things with your guitars and more conventional heavy music."

The album is an exploration of "the human psyche, mental anguish and inner torment", with lyrics that detail personal situations and experiences of the band, mainly focusing on "the darker side of life – from cheating partners on "Something Else", to mental illness on "War", to a real life incident where their friend was left fighting for his life on the haunting "Afterlife".

== Release and promotion ==
On 6 May 2018, the band released the single "Undertones", accompanied by a video inspired by retro video games.

On 15 June 2018, they revealed another single, "War".

Mixtape 1 was released on 6 July 2018 and included single "Undertones" and "Calloused Hands", as well as "I'm Stuck" and "War". The other mixtapes, set for separate releases, have been merged into the final album that was then released in November.

On 27 July 2018, SHVPES premiered the single "Calloused Hands" along with a music video.

On 8 October 2018, the track "Afterlife" was released, and on 15 November 2018 they announced "Rain", new single featuring Matt Heafy of Trivium.

== Critical reception ==
Professional ratings
Review scores
Source	Rating
Already Heard	7/10 stars
Distorted Sound	6/10
Louder Sound	4/5 stars
The Soundboard	8/10

The album has received mixed reviews: many critics appreciated that the band tried to explore different sounds, with rap metal and pop influences. The album has been described as "metalcore with some neat, modern, urban twists", "a sense of harmonious chaos" and "utterly devastating and instrumentally definitive".

Some reviews instead highlighted the lack of originality and depth of the lyrics, resulting in a "poorly orchestrated" album, that could have used more creativity to differentiate themselves from other bands.

== Track listing ==
No.	Title	Length
1.	"Calloused Hands"	3:12
2.	"Undertones"	4:01
3.	"Afterlife"	4:07
4.	"Someone Else"	3:37
5.	"Two Wrongs, No Right"	1:44
6.	"Rain (ft. Matt Heafy)"	3:04
7.	"War"	3:43
8.	"Renegades"	3:49
9.	"Hey Brother"	3:50
10.	"I'm Stuck"	1:41
11.	"Note to Cell"	4:08
12.	"Counterfeit"	3:45
Total length:		40:41

== Personnel ==
- Griffin Dickinson - lead vocals
- Ryan Hamilton - lead guitar, backing vocals
- Youssef Ashraf - rhythm guitar, backing vocals
- Grant Leo Knight - bass
- Harry Jennings - drums
