= Transitions (EP) =

EP by Silverstein
- Released: December 7, 2010
- Recorded: June–July 2010 at Sundown Studio, Guelph, Ontario, Canada
- Genre: Post-hardcore
- Length: 15:56
- Label: Hopeless
- Producer: Jordan Valeriote

Silverstein chronology
Decade (Live at the El Mocambo) (2010)	Transitions (2010)	Rescue (2011)

Transitions is the third EP by the Canadian post-hardcore band Silverstein. It is the band's first release with Hopeless since they left their longtime label, Victory Records. Transitions was released digitally through online media outlets on December 7, 2010. It's also the band's first EP since When the Shadows Beam in 2002, prior to signing with Victory.

== Writing and recording ==
Transitions is the band's first release with their new label, Hopeless. Vocalist Shane Told has always been a long-time fan of the label and the albums they release. Prior to the announcement of the EP, Told had stated in interviews that the band had already written 16 songs for a new album, much more than the average Silverstein album. The Transitions EP has two songs that will appear on the band's 2011 full-length album, as well as three B-sides.

Transitions was mixed by Cameron Webb. (Note: Webb previously worked with the band producing Discovering the Waterfront (2005) and A Shipwreck in the Sand (2009), and mixing Decade (Live at the El Mocambo) (2010). He would later work with the band, mixing Rescue (2011).)

== Release and reception ==
Professional ratings
Review scores
Source	Rating
Absolutepunk.net	(74%)
Alternative Press	2.5/5 stars
The Marshalltown Chronicle	2/5 stars

On November 30, 2010, the EP was made available for pre-order on the iTunes Store. The opening track "Sacrifice" was posted online on December 3. Transitions was released digitally on December 7. According to lead singer Shane Told, the songs "Sacrifice" and "Darling Harbour" will appear on the band's fifth full-length album, and a non-acoustic version of "Replace You" might make the album. After the success of the EP, physical copies were sold.

== Track listing ==
No.	Title	Writer(s)	Length
1.	"Sacrifice"	Shane Told	2:35
2.	"Darling Harbour"	Josh Bradford and Told	2:52
3.	"Dancing on My Grave"	Neil Boshart and Told	3:16
4.	"Replace You" (acoustic version)	Told	3:42
5.	"Wish" (Nine Inch Nails cover)	Trent Reznor	3:31

== Personnel ==
Personnel per digital booklet.

Silverstein

- Shane Told – lead vocals
- Paul Koehler – drums
- Josh Bradford – rhythm guitar
- Neil Boshart – lead guitar
- Billy Hamilton – bass

Additional musician

- Anna Jarvis – cello

Production

- Jordan Valeriote – producer, engineer
- Cameron Webb – mixing (at Maple Sound, Santa Ana, California)
- Chuck Carvalho – mastering
- Inaam Haq – assistant engineer at Cherry Beach
- Shaun Gowman – drum tech
- Sons of Nero – art direction, layout

== Charts ==
Chart (2010)	Peak position
U.S. Billboard Independent Albums	29
