= Pain. Joy. Ecstasy. Despair =

Studio album by SHVPES
- Released: 14 October 2016
- Length: 38:35
- Label: Spinefarm Records/Search And Destroy Records
- Producer: Jim Pinder/Carl Brown

SHVPES chronology
Pain. Joy. Ecstasy. Despair (2016)	Greater Than (2018)

Singles from Pain. Joy. Ecstasy. Despair
- 1. "State Of Mine" Released: 21 May 2015; 2. "God Warrior" Released: 16 May 2016; 3. "False Teeth" Released: 14 June 2016; 4. "Two Minutes Of Hate" Released: 25 July 2016; 5. "Skin And Bones" Released: 6 October 2016; 6. "Pain. Joy. Ecstasy. Despair" Released: 30 January 2017

Pain. Joy. Ecstasy. Despair is the debut studio album by the English metalcore band SHVPES. It was released on 14 October 2016 through Spinefarm Records/Search And Destroy Records and it was produced by Jim Pinder and Carl Brown.

== Background ==
In 2014, Ryan Hamilton, Youssef Ashraf, Oliver Pike and Harry Jennings were in a band called Cytota. Vocalist Joby Fitzgerald had just left the group and, in October, Griffin Dickinson joined them.

At the beginning of 2015, they changed their name to SHVPES and released a track called "SHAPES".

At the same time, they started working on more music with producers Jim Pinder and Carl Brown, who had previously worked with bands like Trivium, Machine Head and While She Sleeps. Dickinson explained: "Working with them was an absolute eye opener. For a load of amateur musicians such as ourselves, to go in and just learn about songwriting was great." The recordings were completed in spring 2016.

Shortly after, bassist Oliver Pike left the band and was then replaced by Grant Leo Knight.

Dickinson also detailed the themes of the album: "As a concept, this album is about finding the beauty in whatever situation you’re in. Your ability to feel pain/to feel despair is ultimately what allows you to embrace the feeling of joy or ecstasy. It’s like yin & yang. ‘Pain. Joy. Ecstasy. Despair’ gave me a platform to expel 24 years’ worth of frustration and turn it into something positive; something I can be proud of and something, I hope, the listener can find solace in."

== Release and promotion ==
On 21 May 2015, they released the single "State Of Mine", along with a video directed by Storm + Shelter that "depicts an individual banned from the online world due to antisocial behaviour".

On 16 May 2016, they revealed a second single "God Warrior". According to Dickinson, "this song’s about the stupidity in following something that’s quite obviously evil.”

On 14 June 2016, "False Teeth" was released.

On 25 July 2016, they premiered "Two Minutes Of Hate". The song was inspired by George Orwell's novel "Nineteen Eighty-Four".

On 6 October 2016, "Skin And Bones" was released, along with a music video, representing "someone who feels like an alien in their surroundings, alone & encircled by people who take them as some sort of gimmick, but they do their own thing regardless".

On 30 January 2017, they released the title track "Pain. Joy. Ecstasy. Despair", accompanied by a video directed by Video Ink.

== Critical reception ==
Professional ratings
Review scores
Source	Rating
Dead Press!	7/10 stars
Drowned In Sound	6/10
New Noise Magazine	4/5 stars
Rocksound	7/10

The album has been defined an impressive success, with critics highlighting the influence of nu metal and alternative metal. Griffin's vocals have been compared to Rage Against the Machine's Zach de la Rocha.

Considered "bold and dynamic, packed with thunderous drum work and gritty riffs that you can really sink your teeth into", Pain. Joy. Ecstasy. Despair has been appreciated as debut effort of a young band with still much to offer.

At the same time, it has been noted that the band need to solidify their sound and to narrow their focus, because "that special something, the magic ingredient that makes a really great record" seems somehow missing.

== Track listing ==
No.	Title	Length
1.	"Bone Theory"	3:12
2.	"State Of Mine"	3:35
3.	"Skin & Bones"	3:18
4.	"False Teeth"	2:38
5.	"Smoke & Mirrors"	3:18
6.	"Breaking The Silence"	3:50
7.	"The Otherside"	3:26
8.	"Two Minutes Of Hate"	3:45
9.	"Pain. Joy. Ecstasy. Despair"	4:06
10.	"God Warrior"	3:43
11.	"Tear Down The Walls"	3:44
Total length:		38:35

== Personnel ==
- Griffin Dickinson - lead vocals
- Ryan Hamilton - lead guitar, backing vocals
- Youssef Ashraf - rhythm guitar, backing vocals
- Oliver Pike - bass
- Harry Jennings - drums
