= City of Vultures =

2010 heavy metal album by Rise to Remain

Studio album by Rise to Remain
- Released: 5 September 2011; June 5, 2012 (NA)
- Recorded: July 2010–November 2010
- Genre: Metalcore, heavy metal
- Length: 45:19
- Label: EMI, Century Media (NA)
- Producer: Colin Richardson, Carl Bown, Dan Weller (NA Bonus tracks)

Rise to Remain chronology
Bridges Will Burn (EP) (2010)	City of Vultures (2011)	Over and Over (single) (2014)

Singles from City of Vultures
- 1. "The Serpent" Released: 22 March 2011; 2. "Nothing Left" Released: 10 June 2011; 3. "Power Through Fear" Released: 23 September 2011; 4. "This Day Is Mine" Released: 19 December 2011; 5. "Talking in Whispers" Released: 21 March 2012

City of Vultures is the first and only studio album by the British metal band Rise to Remain. It was released on 5 September 2011 through EMI Records, and in the United States on 5 June 2012 through Century Media Records. It debuted at #83 on the UK Album Charts and at No. 3 UK Rock Chart as well as No. 10 on the International Top 12 Charts in India.

== Recording ==
City of Vultures was recorded over the course of four months, beginning in July 2010 at Chapel Studios in Lincolnshire, UK, and concluding in November 2010 Treehouse Studios in Chesterfield, UK. Colin Richardson, in his first production effort since Bullet for My Valentine's 2008 album "Scream Aim Fire", produced the album along with co-producer Carl Bown. It is the band's first release with EMI, whom they signed with in March 2011 after the subsequent completion of the album in November of the previous year. It features two songs from their EP, Bridges Will Burn: "Nothing Left" and "Bridges Will Burn". In July 2011, Kerrang! magazine hosted a complete album playback for 5 competition winners, prior to the album's release in September. From 15:00 (UTC +1) on 29 August, Rise to Remain made the entire album available for streaming for 24 hours, one week before the album's release.

== Critical reception ==
Professional ratings
Review scores
Source	Rating
AllMusic	3/5 stars
BBC	(favourable)
Big Cheese	4/5 stars
Front	5/5 stars
Kerrang!	4/5 stars
Metal Hammer	8/10 stars
Powerplay	8/10 stars
Q	8/10 stars
Rock Sound	8/10 stars
Thrash Hits	4.5/6 stars

The album has received very strong acclaim within music publications. Kerrang! Magazine awarded the album 4/5, Metal Hammer 8/10, Q Magazine 8/10, Big Cheese 4/5, Rocksound 8/10, Powerplay 8/10 and Front Magazine gave the album a full 5/5. Tracks such as "Power Through Fear" and "Nothing Left" have received rotation on BBC Radio 1 and XFM, courtesy of Fearne Cotton, Daniel P Carter and Zane Lowe, who have all highly praised the songs and the album itself. The more ambiguous reviews came in from publications such as The Guardian, which gave the album 3/5, as well as Allmusic, which claimed that "The band appears unwilling to deviate from its intense guitar-shredding formula, meaning the album begins to run out of steam well before the rather brutal finale, "Bridges Will Burn," draws to a close.".

== Chart positions ==
Album

Year	Chart	Position
2011	India	10
2011	UK	83
2011	Norway	27

== Track listing ==
All music by Rise to Remain, all lyrics by Austin Dickinson.

No.	Title	Length
1.	"Intro"	0:51
2.	"The Serpent"	3:36
3.	"This Day Is Mine"	3:19
4.	"City of Vultures"	5:00
5.	"Talking in Whispers"	4:07
6.	"God Can Bleed"	3:46
7.	"Power Through Fear"	3:51
8.	"Nothing Left"	3:05
9.	"We Will Last Forever"	4:14
10.	"Illusions"	4:07
11.	"Roads"	4:19
12.	"Bridges Will Burn"	5:08
Total length:		45:19

North American Bonus Tracks
No.	Title	Length
13.	"The Unwanted"	3:51
14.	"Breaking the Hollow"	4:09
15.	"Darkest Days"	3:46
16.	"Heartless"	3:39

== Personnel ==
Rise to Remain

- Austin Dickinson – lead vocals
- Pat Lundy – drums
- Ben Tovey – lead guitar
- Will Homer – rhythm guitar
- Joe Copcutt – bass guitar
- Michael Pitman – drums (On tracks 13–16)

Production

- Colin Richardson – production, mix
- Carl Bown – co-production, engineering, mix
- Ted Jensen – mastering
- Dan Weller – production, bass (on North American release bonus tracks)
- Tim Morris – engineering (on North American release bonus tracks)
