= Give Me Dirt =

Studio album by Cancer Bats
- Released: 7 August 2026
- Genres: Hardcore punk, sludge metal, metalcore
- Length: 38:46
- Labels: Marshall Records, Bat Skull Records

Cancer Bats chronology
Psychic Jailbreak (2022)	Give Me Dirt (2026)

Singles from Give Me Dirt
- 1. "Stay Stuck" Released: 5 May 2026; 2. "Long Tooth" Released: 10 June 2026; 3. "Give Me Dirt" Released: 7 August 2026

Give Me Dirt is the eighth studio album by Cancer Bats, released on Friday 7 August 2026. It is the first album with guitarist Jackson Landry.

The album features several guest vocalist appearances, which includes Nate Newton of Converge, Chris Cresswell of The Flatliners, indie-folk singer Brooklyn Doran, and Death by Stereo's Efrem Schulz.

Frontman Liam Cormier returned to rural Nova Scotia to write the lyrics and vocal melodies, with the album being inspired by a year of travel and connections to nature. The songs explore the processing of personal losses and environmental devastation.

To create the art work, Cormier utilised mixed media of collage, painting and stencilling to create the art in a physical format which was later scanned and photographed for use.

A deluxe version of the album was available to download for one week following the release date.

== Track listing ==
No.	Title	Length
1.	"World Wild Fire Death Race" (featuring Nate Newton)	3:31
2.	"Stay Stuck"	3:44
3.	"Don't Trip"	3:03
4.	"Bright Eyes of Gold" (featuring Chris Creswell)	3:25
5.	"Give Me Dirt"	3:42
6.	"Long Tooth" (featuring Brooklyn Doran)	3:25
7.	"Speed Wizard"	2:58
8.	"Ocean Crash"	4:33
9.	"Positive Grid"	3:10
10.	"Prognosis"	3:53
11.	"Fools Like You" (featuring Efrem Schulz)	3:22
Total length:		38:46

Deluxe Edition
No.	Title	Length
12.	"Cinnamon Girl" (Neil Young Cover)	2:57
13.	"Salut Anselm"	2:21
14.	"Spinning Head"	3:34
Total length:		47:33

Professional Ratings
Review scores
Source	Rating
Kerrang!	4/5

== Personnel ==
=== Band lineup ===
- Liam Cormier – lead vocals
- Jaye Schwarzer – bass, backing vocals
- Jackson Landry – guitars
- Mike Peters – drums, percussion

=== Production and engineering ===
- Kurt Ballou – producer
- Zach Weekes – assistant engineer
- Ian Romano – additional production
- Liam Cormier – art work
