= Searching for Zero =

Studio album by Cancer Bats
- Released: March 10, 2015
- Genres: Hardcore punk, sludge metal, metalcore
- Length: 32:59
- Label: New Damage
- Producer: Ross Robinson

Cancer Bats chronology
Dead Set on Living (2012)	Searching for Zero (2015)	The Spark That Moves (2018)

Singles from Searching for Zero
- 1. "Satellites" Released: 9 November 2014; 2. "True Zero" Released: 26 January 2015; 3. "Beelzebub" Released: 17 August 2015

Searching for Zero is the fifth studio album by the Canadian hardcore punk band Cancer Bats. It was released on 10 March 2015 and was recorded in Ross Robinson's studio in Venice Beach, California.

== Track listing ==
All tracks are written by Liam Cormier, Scott Middleton, Mike Peters and Jaye R. Schwarzer.

No.	Title	Length
1.	"Satellites"	4:05
2.	"True Zero"	3:20
3.	"Arsenic in the Year of the Snake"	2:25
4.	"Beelzebub"	3:50
5.	"Devil's Blood"	2:32
6.	"Cursed with a Conscience"	4:10
7.	"All Hail"	1:28
8.	"Buds"	3:26
9.	"Dusted"	4:11
10.	"No More Bullshit"	3:39
Total length:		32:59

Bonus Tracks
No.	Title	Length
12.	"Kill Me Please..."	2:54
13.	"Rust And Bone"	4:04
Total length:		47:33

Professional ratings
Review scores
Source	Rating
AllMusic	(7/10)

== Personnel ==
Cancer Bats

- Liam Cormier – lead vocals
- Scott Middleton – guitar
- Mike Peters – drums, percussion
- Jaye R. Schwarzer – bass guitar

Additional personnel

- Ross Robinson – production
