= Rise to Remain =

English rock band

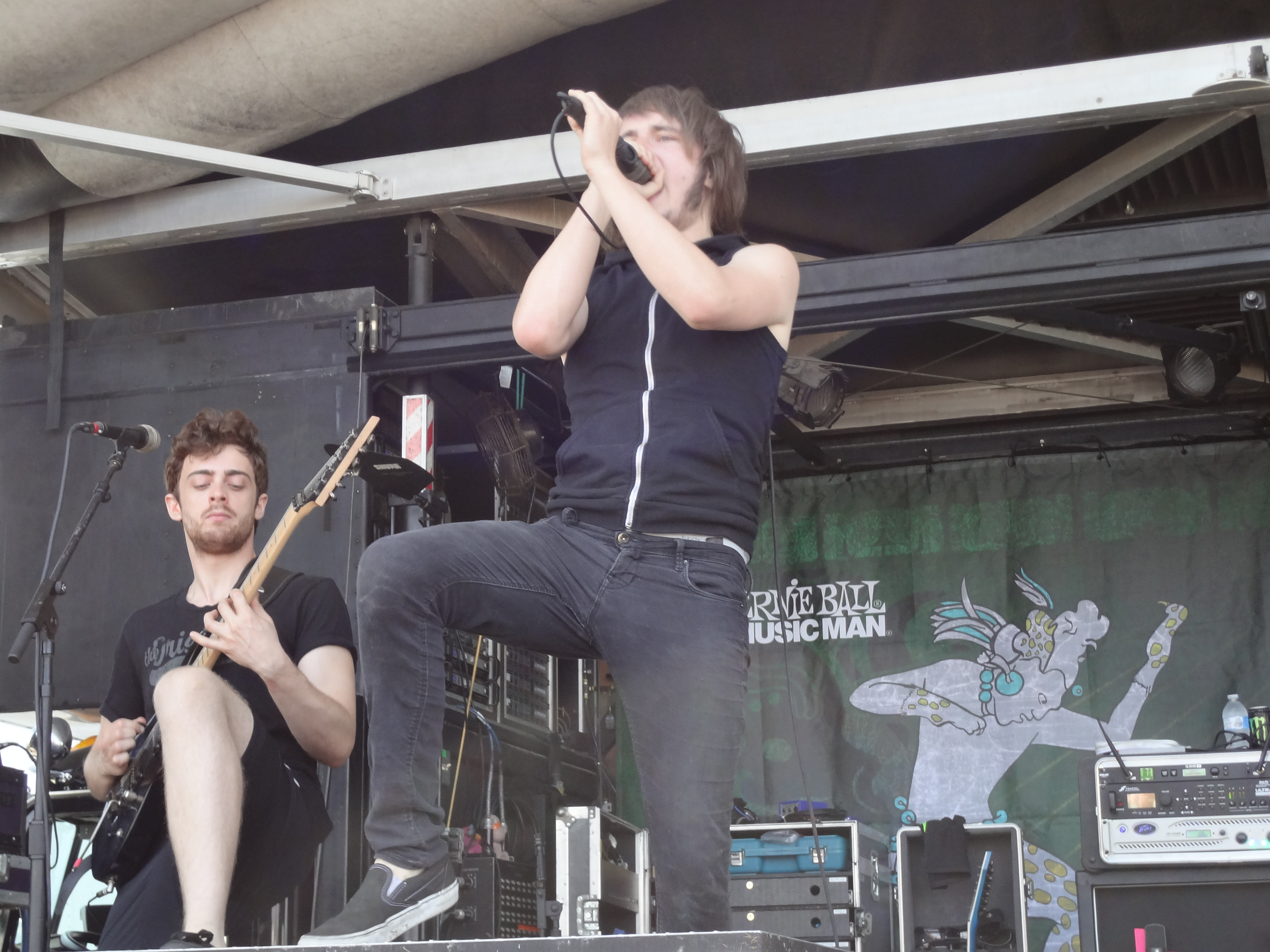
- Rise to Remain in 2012 – Ben Tovey and Austin Dickinson

Background information
- Origin: London, England
- Genres: Metalcore, heavy metal
- Years active: 2006–2015
- Labels: EMI, Century Media
- Spinoffs: As Lions
- Past members: Theo Tan; Ali White; Aubrey Jackson-Blake; Timothy Shelly; Joe Copcutt; Pat Lundy; Josh Hammond; Ben Tovey; Will Homer; Austin Dickinson; Conor O'Keefe; Adam Lewin
- Website: risetoremain.com

Rise to Remain was an English, London-based heavy metal band formed in 2006 and disbanded in 2015. The band made appearances at Download Festival, Sonisphere Festival and extensively toured the UK and Europe. The band released three EPs, the majority of which were "viral" releases, via their MySpace. On 16 March 2011 they signed their first major recording contract with EMI records, which was accompanied by the launch of their website and a free single download entitled "The Serpent". Their debut album, City of Vultures, was released on 5 September 2011, nearly a year after they had started work on recording the album. It was produced by revered metal producer Colin Richardson and Carl Bown. In 2014, the band released a new single entitled "Over and Over", which would be their last musical release.

The band were praised by magazines, such as Metal Hammer and Kerrang!, with the former releasing a scaled-down version of their first nationwide-release EP, Bridges Will Burn. They received radioplay through the likes of BBC Radio One and Total Rock, as well as having their music videos regularly rotated on Scuzz and Kerrang! TV. They were voted "Best New Band" at the 2010 Metal Hammer "Golden God Awards", an award decided by 400,000 votes around the globe, and the 2010 Kerrang! Award for "Best British Newcomer".

In January 2015 the band announced that they would be splitting up. Vocalist Austin Dickinson (son of Iron Maiden's Bruce Dickinson), bassist Connor O'Keefe, and guitarist Will Homer subsequently formed a new band, As Lions.

== History ==
=== Halide (2006–2008) ===
They were formed in London, late 2006, by Ben Tovey (son of conductor Bramwell Tovey) and Will Homer (formerly of Hours Past) along with other schoolmates under the name "Halide" as a side project to several of the band's members other endeavors in music. Within a few months the band solidified their line-up, adding Austin Dickinson (formerly of The Oath and son of Iron Maiden's Bruce Dickinson) on vocals after their respective bands played a show together at the "Tufnell Park Dome" and began playing local gigs as well as travelling across the UK, seeking out more shows. Halide recorded one three-track EP, which saw a viral release through their Myspace. This eventually garnered attention from more legitimate local promoters, who granted the band further exposure by putting them on at slightly higher profile shows, namely with Biomechanical and other local heavyweights such as Eternal Lord and Exit Ten. The band then organised a UK tour, with them and local act Terrorlapse, as well as playing one-off supports to their peers in bands such as Viatrophy, Sylosis, Anterior and Malefice. In early 2008, whilst playing the Islington Academy supporting Sylosis, the band were offered the opening slot on the smaller, third stage of the Download Festival at Donington Park at 10:45 am. This opportunity lead to the band changing members, adding Joe Copcutt on bass and Pat Lundy on drums (both formerly of 12 Ton Method), and their name, switching from Halide, to Rise to Remain. However, they still retained early songs that would later be recorded for Rise to Remain, namely Purify, Illusive Existence, Salvation and Fracture.

=== Rise to Remain & Bridges Will Burn EP (2008–2010) ===
The band swiftly changed their name to Rise to Remain, and played one last show as Halide at the Camden Rock Bar. The ensuing Download Festival performance drew minor attention to the band, and lead to them securing a booking agent, Paul Ryan. During the summer of 2008, the band undertook their first recording as Rise to Remain, creating the EP Becoming One. This was then self-released by the band.

The band then became more active, beginning with opening slots for more local bands, including homegrown heroes Exit Ten and Viatrophy and Australian death metallers The Red Shore, and eventually completing a co-headline club tour with Holy Grail, and supporting the likes of Shadows Fall, Five Finger Death Punch, The Haunted and Trivium, as well as appearing at Sonisphere Festival and Download Festival. The band also recorded a cover of the Judas Priest song "The Rage", for a Metal Hammer tribute CD. During the recording of Bridges Will Burn the band were briefly signed to indie label Transcend Records, however, the deal was not honoured and therefore, Rise to Remain left the label and remained an unsigned act, releasing their EP free with Metal Hammer magazine in 2010. There were no releases on Transcend Records from the band. On 14 June 2010, Rise to Remain were given the Metal Hammer Golden God Award, for "Best New Band", an award that was voted for by "over 400,000 people across the globe." Also in 2010, the band won "Best British Newcomer" at the Kerrang! Awards. The band supported Korn on their UK tour in October 2010, and then completed a string of shows supporting Funeral for a Friend, as well as being added to the line-up of Bullet for My Valentine's European tour in November 2010, after Escape the Fate were unable to fulfill their slot. As a result of the Bullet for My Valentine tour, the band had to drop out of a UK tour supporting As I Lay Dying and Suicide Silence, but returned to support Hatebreed on their UK dates in December 2010. Between July and November 2010, the band recorded their debut album with producer, Colin Richardson, who has worked with Carcass, Machine Head and Bullet for My Valentine, amongst others.

=== Major label signing & City of Vultures (2011–2012) ===
The band performed as an opening act for Iron Maiden on the Singapore & Indonesian leg of their world tour in February 2011 and followed on from there to appear as part of the Australian leg of the Soundwave Festival, playing with such bands as Sevendust, Stone Sour, Queens of the Stone Age and many more. Upon their return to the UK, the band signed with major label EMI Records, and released a track from their debut album, entitled "The Serpent", which received several thousand downloads in its first 24 hours. The band then went and supported Funeral for a Friend on their headline tour throughout March and April. They played major festivals over the summer of 2011 such as Download Festival, Sonisphere (UK, Switzerland, Italy and France), Hevy Festival and Graspop Festival.

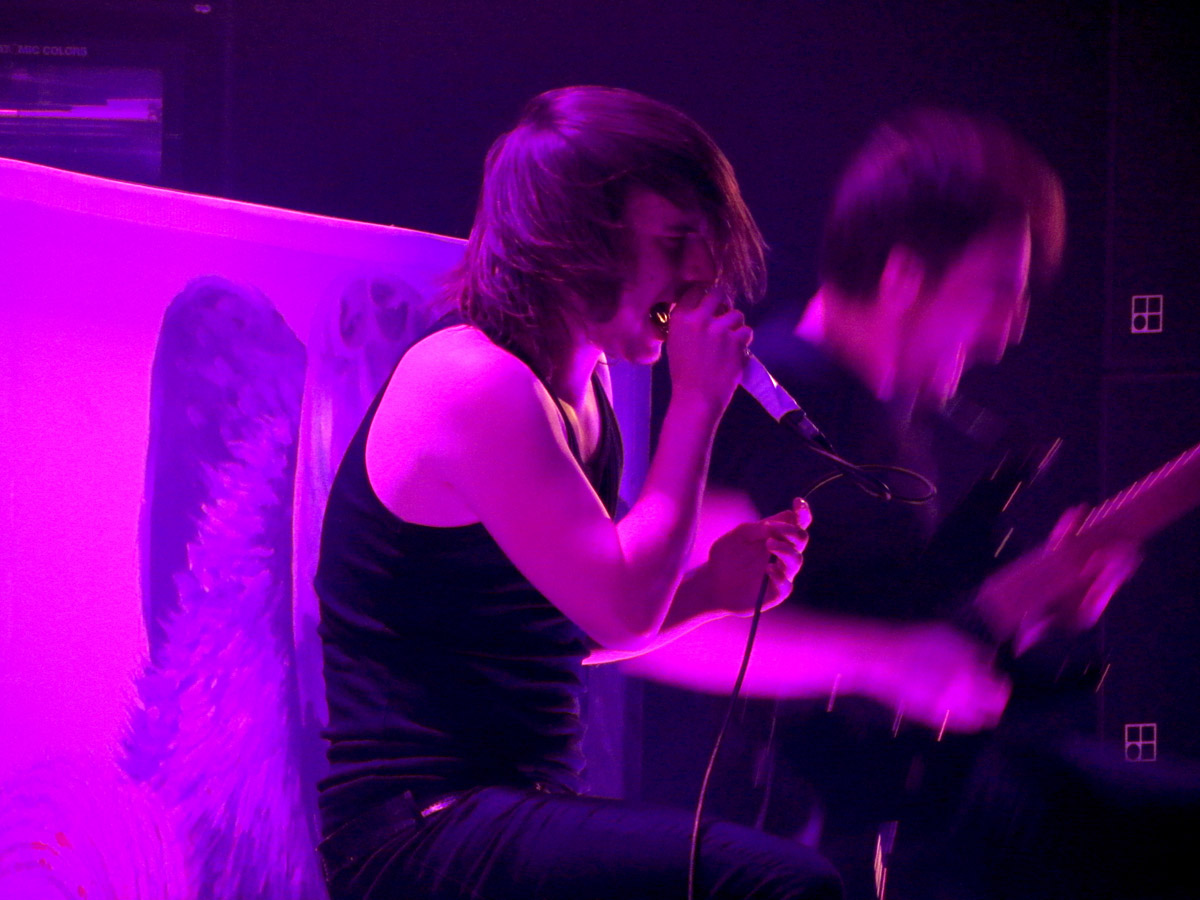
Austin Dickinson, lead vocalist of Rise to Remain, live in Stadthalle Offenbach.

The band's debut album, City of Vultures, was released on 5 September and debuted in the UK at No. 83 and in India at No. 10. With this, the band started their UK headline tour on 7 September 2011 with support from The Safety Fire and Bleed from Within. This was a 19 date tour which was supposed to finish on 29 September, but due to one of the dates being rearranged it finished on 1 October. The band was soon after meant to go on a US tour supporting Chimera, however they pulled out after the band was given the opportunity to support Machine Head in the US the following year. In November, Rise to Remain headed out with Trivium and In Flames as support for their European tour. The tour then headed to the UK in December 2011 as the Defenders of the Faith III Tour which was announced back in July 2011. Ghost and Insense joined Rise to Remain in support of Trivium and In Flames.

For Kerrang! Magazine's celebration of the 20th anniversary of influential grunge band Nirvana's breakthrough album, Nevermind, Rise to Remain contributed a cover of the song "Breed", on a cover album featuring artists such as The Dillinger Escape Plan (who covered "Territorial Pissings"), Evile (who covered "Lounge Act"), and The Blackout (covering "Stay Away").

After concluding the tour supporting Trivium and In Flames, Rise to Remain closed their touring commitments for 2011. Starting on 15 January 2012, Rise to Remain were meant to support Machine Head on their North American tour along with Suicide Silence and Darkest Hour in support. However, on 6 January 2012, bassist Joe Copcutt and drummer Pat Lundy announced their departure from the band, made public by the Rocksound and Blabbermouth websites. Lundy is now the drummer for the Welsh post-hardcore band Funeral for a Friend and Copcutt now plays bass in the British-Canadian supergroup AxeWound. Consequently, the band had to pull out from the Machine Head US Tour. City of Vultures was due to have been released in North America on 24 January, coinciding with the Machine Head US Tour.

The band enlisted Adam Lewin on drums and Josh Hammond on bass guitar for their second UK headline tour, in March 2012. However a few weeks after the end of the tour while the band was at rest, Josh Hammond left the band. This was announced in early June when the band released details of the new bass player to replace him, Conor O'Keefe, via a picture on their Facebook page.

City of Vultures was released in the US on 5 June 2012. The North American special edition CD included download links to four bonus audio tracks ("Breaking the Hollow," "Darkest Days," "Heartless" and "The Unwanted") that were recorded specifically for this release as well as all four of City of Vultures' music videos ("Nothing Left," "Power Through Fear," "The Serpent" and "This Day Is Mine"). On 8 June 2012 Rise to Remain and Cancer Bats were due to play the main stage of Download Festival 2012, however, both bands were pulled due to weather conditions, with Cancer Bats later downsizing and playing the smaller Red Bull Bedroom Jam stage.

Rise to Remain then continued onwards to become part of the annual Vans Warped Tour, beginning on 13 June 2012, and culminating 5 August, and performing with acts such as Miss May I, Born of Osiris, For Today, Chelsea Grin, The Ghost Inside, Breathe Carolina, Sleeping with Sirens, Pierce the Veil and Taking Back Sunday. The tour was the first North American endeavour for the group.

=== Second album, split and As Lions (2013–2015) ===
In 2013 Rise to Remain began writing their second album. The band announced a one-off intimate headline show in London, prior to their main stage performance at Download Festival on 14 June where they opened the festival. At Download Festival the band played one of their new songs called, "Over and Over". On 10 February 2014, the band premiered their first single off their new album titled "Over and Over" on Radio 1 Rock Show.

In January 2015 the band announced that they were splitting up, with three members, Will, Connor, and Austin, continuing to work together in a new band, As Lions, while Ben and Adam did not pursue further bands.

== Musical style and influences ==
Rise to Remain was essentially a metalcore band, with roots from heavy metal music, and hard rock. Austin Dickinson has stated that the band are influenced by a wide variety of artists such as Killswitch Engage, Lamb of God, Slipknot, Pantera, Metallica, Deftones, Rage Against the Machine, Unearth, All That Remains, Trivium, In Flames, Shadows Fall, Bullet for My Valentine, Rush, Nirvana, and Machine Head. Austin has stated in an interview, "My personal influences are Chino Moreno of Deftones, Mike Patton of Faith No More and Jesse Leach of Killswitch Engage. I think those three vocalists sum up the technique, lyrics and stage presence that I massively respect." The band has also covered Judas Priest and Metallica with the songs "The Rage", and "Enter Sandman". Also, on the album Kerrang Presents Nirvana: Nevermind Forever, Rise to Remain recorded a cover of Nirvana's song "Breed" originally off the album Nevermind as a tribute to their influence.

In an interview with guitarist Ben Tovey, he has stated his influences are: "Metallica, Pantera, Sepultura, Fear Factory, Shadows Fall, Killswitch Engage, Bullet for My Valentine, Iron Maiden, Linkin Park, Ill Niño, Limp Bizkit, Hatebreed, Lamb of God, and All That Remains... to name a few!"

== Band members ==
Final lineup

- Ben Tovey – lead guitar (2006–2015)
- Will Homer – rhythm guitar (2006–2015)
- Austin Dickinson – vocals (2007–2015)
- Conor O'Keefe – bass (2012–2015)
- Adam Lewin – drums (2012–2015)

Former members

- Theo Tan – bass (2006–2008)
- Ali White – drums, percussion (2007–2008)
- Aubrey Jackson-Blake – synthesizer (2007–2008)
- Timothy Shelley – drums (2007)
- Joe Copcutt – bass (2008–2012)
- Pat Lundy – drums (2008–2012)
- Josh Hammond – bass (2012)

Timeline

== Discography ==
Studio album	Date	Other info
City of Vultures	2011	Studio Album

Extended plays	Date	Other info
Illusive Existence	2007	As Halide
Becoming One	2008	EP
Bridges Will Burn	2010	EP

Music video	Date	Director(s)
Bridges Will Burn	2010	Ramon Boutviseth
The Serpent	2011	Ben Smith
Nothing Left	2011	Shane Davey
Power Through Fear	2012	Shane Davey
Talking in Whispers	2012	Jamie Carter
