= Cancer Bats (EP) =

EP by Cancer Bats
- Released: 2005
- Recorded: October 2004
- Genre: Hardcore punk
- Length: 10:37
- Label: Self-released
- Producer: Scott Middleton

Cancer Bats chronology
Cancer Bats (2005)	Birthing the Giant (2006)

Cancer Bats was the first EP by the band Cancer Bats. It was produced and engineered by Cancer Bats' guitarist Scott Middleton. This EP was sold at all the live shows leading up until the release of Cancer Bats' first album Birthing the Giant and later repressed as a 7" record by Tragicomedy Records.

== Track listing ==
1. Bloodpact – 3:02
2. Shillelagh – 3:20
3. Ragin' Hard – 2:35
4. Technolokron – 1:38
