= Bridges Will Burn =

EP by Rise To Remain
- Released: 7 March 2010
- Recorded: England
- Genre: Metalcore
- Length: 22:59
- Label: Search and Destroy; Metal Hammer
- Producer: Dan Weller and Justin Paul Hill

Rise To Remain chronology
Becoming One (EP) (2008)	Bridges Will Burn (2010)	City of Vultures (2012)

Singles from Bridges Will Burn EP
- 1. "Bridges Will Burn" Released: 4 April 2010

Bridges Will Burn is the second released EP by British metalcore band Rise To Remain, but the first record recorded on a label. It was released on 7 March 2010 through Search And Destroy Records, and was produced by Dan Weller. The EP was released free with Issue 202 (March 2010) of British magazine Metal Hammer.

The MP3 has two additional songs taken from the band's first self-released EP Becoming One. The band's first music video was made for the song "Bridges Will Burn", and was released on 4 April 2010.

== Background and composition ==
Before its re-release on Bridges Will Burn, "Illusive Existence" debuted by Halide (now Rise To Remain) on their Myspace page. The song didn't get much attention at the release.

== Critical reception ==
Professional ratings
Review scores
Source	Rating
Ultimate Guitar Archive	8.8/10 stars
SputnikMusic	3.5/5 stars

Robert Garland, writing for SputnikMusic, praised the album for the creative adaptation of metalcore cliché, including "the heavy usually screamed verses broken by a cleanly sung chorus structure lining, integrating in a way to "not tire listeners or make them skip tracks". Graland also liked the "machine gun like double bass drum work", "superb heavy guitar riffs", and "throat ripping screamed vocal lines", highlighting the songs "Bridges Will Burn" and "Illusive Existence". Moreover, the clean production on in the chorus lines "add to Rise To Remains' creative diversity levels and highlights the talent yet to be unleashed into the metal community. On a negative side, Garland found the vocals sometimes switching to a "whiny note or two in various parts of the tracks that take some of the musical quality as a whole down a notch", and criticized the slow song progression that diminishes the "desired effect on the listener".

The editor for Ultimate Guitar Archive praises this release, comparing to the work of Trivium and Chimaira, with Bullet For My Valentine-like riffs.

== Track listing ==
No.	Title	Lyrics	Music	Length
1.	"Bridges Will Burn"	Austin Dickinson	Ben Tovey	4:54
2.	"Nothing Left"	Austin Dickinson	Ben Tovey, Pat Lundy, Will Homer	3:02
3.	"Purify"	Austin Dickinson	Ben Tovey, Will Homer	4:17
4.	"Illusive Existence"	Austin Dickinson	Ben Tovey, Pat Lundy	4:02
Total length:				22:59

iTunes bonus tracks
No.	Title	Lyrics	Music	Length
5.	"Salvation"	Austin Dickinson	Rise To Remain	3:35
6.	"Fracture"	Austin Dickinson	Rise To Remain	3:49

== Personnel ==
Rise To Remain

- Austin Dickinson – lead vocals
- Pat Lundy – drums
- Ben Tovey – lead guitar
- Will Homer – rhythm guitar
- Joe Copcutt – bass guitar

Production

- Produced by Dan Weller
