= Birthing the Giant =

Studio album by Cancer Bats
- Released: June 6, 2006
- Recorded: 2005–2006
- Genres: Hardcore punk, metalcore, sludge metal
- Length: 40:10
- Label: Distort
- Producer: Gavin Brown

Cancer Bats chronology
Cancer Bats EP (2005)	Birthing the Giant (2006)	Hail Destroyer (2007)

Singles from Birthing the Giant
- 1. "French Immersion" Released: February 18, 2007

Professional ratings
Review scores
Source	Rating
AllMusic	3.5/5 stars
Now	3/5 stars
Punknews.org	4.5/5 stars
The Skinny	3/5 stars

Birthing the Giant is Cancer Bats' first full-length album. It was released on June 6, 2006, by Distort Entertainment in Canada and on September 5, 2006, by Abacus Recordings in the US.

Videos were shot for "100 Grand Canyon," "French Immersion," and "Pneumonia Hawk."

== Critical reception ==
Exclaim! wrote that "with all the swagger of Southern rock but all the slummy goodness of New York City punk, the Cancer Bats slam through 12 impressively heavy tracks." The Skinny called the album "a pick-squealing romp of metal riffery interspersed with some slamming punk chord progressions."

== Track listing ==
1. "Golden Tanks" – 3:46
2. "French Immersion" – 3:10
3. "Grenades" – 3:51
4. "Shillelagh" – 3:19
5. "Butterscotch" – 3:08
6. "Death Bros" – 4:48
7. "Firecrack This" – 3:30
8. "Diamond Mine" – 4:16
9. "100 Grand Canyon" – 2:44
10. "Ghost Bust That" – 3:47
11. "Pneumonia Hawk" (featuring George Pettit of Alexisonfire) – 3:55

Bonus track

- "Roy Rogers Party" – 3:28
