= The Spark That Moves =

Studio album by Cancer Bats
- Released: April 24, 2018
- Genres: Hardcore punk, sludge metal, metalcore
- Length: 35:00
- Label: New Damage

Cancer Bats chronology
Searching for Zero (2015)	The Spark That Moves (2018)	Psychic Jailbreak (2022)

The Spark That Moves is Cancer Bats' sixth full-length album. The Spark That Moves was released as a surprise on Friday 20 April 2018.

== Track listing ==
No.	Title	Length
1.	"Gatekeeper"	2:47
2.	"Brightest Day"	2:49
3.	"We Run Free"	3:22
4.	"Space and Time"	3:09
5.	"Bed Of Nails"	3:28
6.	"Headwound"	2:57
7.	"Fear Will Kill Us All"	3:38
8.	"Rattlesnake"	2:35
9.	"Can't Sleep"	2:40
10.	"Heads Will Roll"	3:34
11.	"Winterpeg (feat. Chris Hannah)"	3:03
Total length:		35:00

== Personnel ==
Cancer Bats

- Liam Cormier – lead vocals
- Jaye R. Schwarzer – bass, backing vocals
- Scott Middleton – lead and rhythm guitars
- Mike Peters – drums, percussion

== Awards and nominations ==
Year	Award	Category	Nominee/Work	Result	Ref
2019	Juno Award	Metal/Hard Music Album of the Year	Nominated	The Spark that Moves	
