= Psychic Jailbreak =

Studio album by Cancer Bats
- Released: April 22, 2022
- Genres: Hardcore punk, heavy metal, southern rock
- Length: 36:00
- Label: Bat Skull Records

Cancer Bats chronology
The Spark That Moves (2018)	Psychic Jailbreak (2022)	Give Me Dirt (2026)

Psychic Jailbreak is the seventh full-length album by Cancer Bats, released on Friday 15 April 2022. It is the first album since the departure of guitarist Scott Middleton. The record marks the first collaboration with Canadian singer Brooklyn Doran on track 5.

== Track listing ==
No.	Title	Length
1.	"Radiate"	3:04
2.	"The Hoof"	3:00
3.	"Lonely Bong"	3:07
4.	"Friday Night"	2:54
5.	"... Hammering On" (featuring Brooklyn Doran)	4:11
6.	"Crocodiles"	3:00
7.	"Shadow of Mercury"	2:57
8.	"Keep on Breathing"	4:25
9.	"Pressure Mind"	3:25
10.	"Rollin Threes"	3:58
11.	"Psychic Jailbreak"	3:03
Total length:		36:00

== Personnel ==
=== Band lineup ===
- Liam Cormier – lead vocals
- Jaye Schwarzer – guitars, bass, backing vocals
- Mike Peters – drums, percussion

=== Production and engineering ===
- JP Peters – producer, recording
- Derek Benjamin – recording
- Eric Ratz – mixing
- Harry Hess – mastering

=== Additional credits and design ===
- Liam Cormier – artwork
- Bree Rawn – layout
- Sid Tang – photography
- Cancer Bats & JP Peters – extra noises (including signature skateboard sounds)
- Sammy & Vander – backing vocals (kid howls)
- Misha The Dog – backing vocals (wolf howls)
- Brooklyn Doran – additional vocals, track 5

== Awards and nominations ==
Year	Award	Category	Nominee/Work	Result	Ref
2023	Juno Awards	Metal/Hard Music Album of the Year	Nominated	Psychic Jailbreak	
