= As Lions =

British rock band

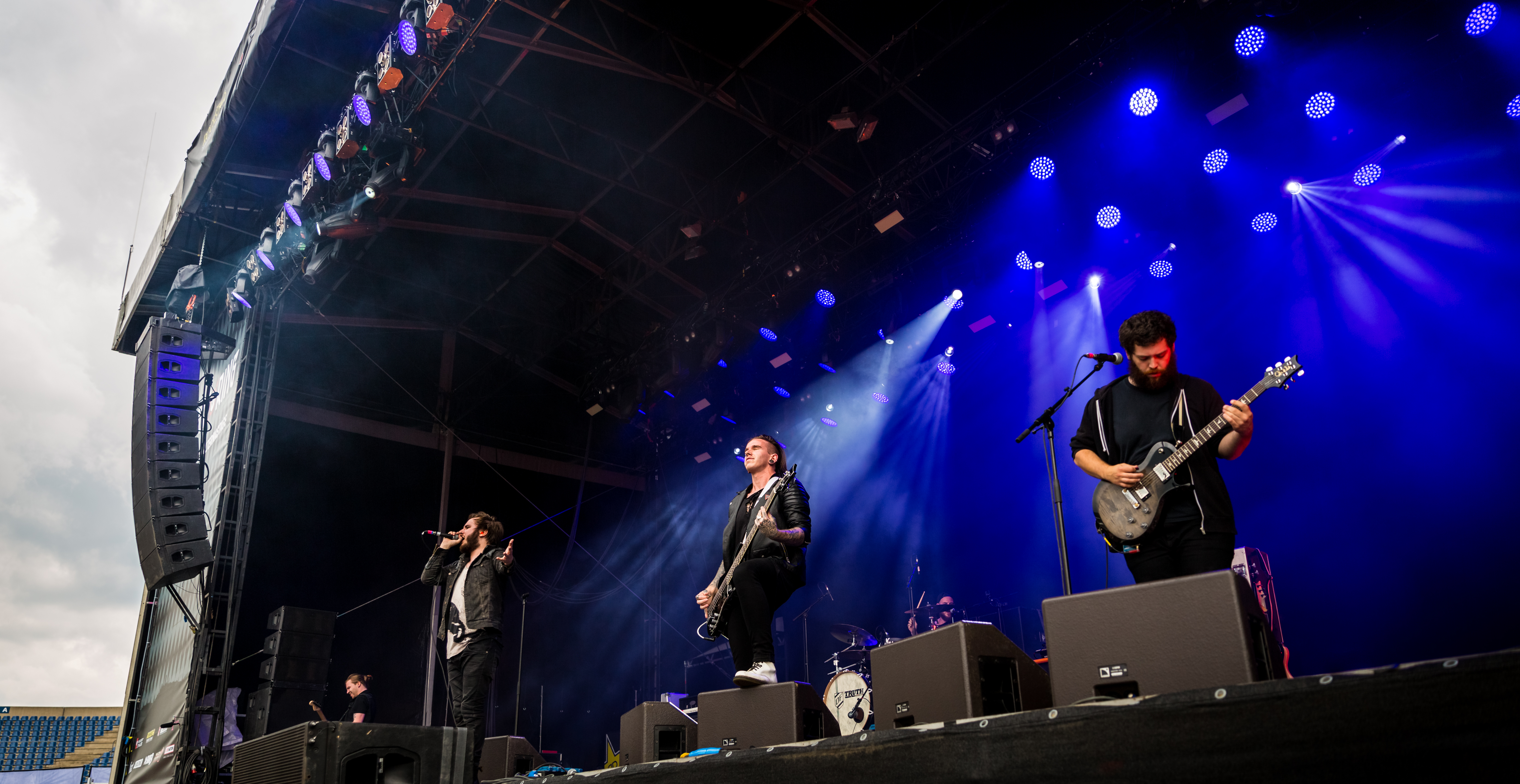
- As Lions in 2017

Background information
- Origin: London, England
- Genres: Alternative metal; alternative rock; metalcore
- Years active: 2015–2018 (hiatus)
- Label: Better Noise
- Members: Austin Dickinson; Connor O'Keefe; Will Homer; Stefan Whiting; Dave Fee

As Lions are a British alternative metal band originating from London, England. The band was formed in 2015 by Austin Dickinson (son of Iron Maiden frontman Bruce Dickinson), Will Homer and Conor O'Keefe – all formerly of Rise to Remain. They have released one album, Selfish Age, and are signed to Better Noise. Their lead single, "Aftermath", has had success at US radio, reaching number 12 on both the Mediabase Active rock and Billboard Mainstream Rock charts. They have toured extensively with acts such as Shinedown, Five Finger Death Punch, Nothing More, Trivium and Alter Bridge.

== Members ==
- Austin Dickinson – lead vocals
- Connor O'Keefe – lead guitar, keyboards
- Will Homer – rhythm guitar
- Stefan Whiting – bass
- Dave Fee – drums

== Discography ==
=== Albums ===
- Selfish Age (2017)

=== Singles ===
List of singles, with selected chart positions, showing year released and album name
Title	Year	Peak chart positions	Album
Title	Year	US Main.	Album
"Aftermath"	2016	12	Selfish Age
"Selfish Age"	2017	—	Selfish Age

=== Promotional singles ===
- "The Suffering"
- "White Flag"
- "Pieces"
- "One by One"
- "The Fall"

=== Music videos ===
Song	Year	Director
"Aftermath"	2016	Shane Davey
"One by One"	2017	Video Ink
"Selfish Age"	2017	Ryan Chang
