= Dead Set on Living =

Studio album by Cancer Bats
- Released: April 16, 2012
- Genres: Hardcore punk, metalcore, sludge metal
- Length: 38:50
- Label: Distort
- Producers: Eric Ratz, Kenny Luong

Cancer Bats chronology
Bears, Mayors, Scraps & Bones (2010)	Dead Set on Living (2012)	Searching for Zero (2015)

Singles from Dead Set on Living
- 1. "Old Blood" Released: February 6, 2012; 2. "Road Sick" Released: February 19, 2012; 3. "R.A.T.S" Released: August 17, 2012

Dead Set on Living is the fourth studio album by the Canadian hardcore punk band Cancer Bats. It was released on April 16, 2012 through Hassle Records in Europe, April 17 through Distort Entertainment in Canada, April 20 through Shock Records in Australia and New Zealand, and April 23 through Metal Blade Records in the United States. The album was recorded in December 2011.

== Style ==
The band has stated that the album is to be a more "upbeat" follow up to their previous album Bears, Mayors, Scraps & Bones, with vocalist Liam Cormier saying the album was lyrically far too dark for what the band wanted to do. In December 2011, Liam Cormier was asked about whether the groups sound has change much. "I think sound-wise there's definitely more of the natural evolution of how gnarly we keep getting and how more refined everyone sounds. I'd say the majority of our fans now have seen our band live and know how gnarly and ferocious it is, so trying to compress that into a recording still is kind of difficult. Like we'd say 'I thought we did it pretty well on Bears', and then we'd re-examine it and see there's still some elements that are missing."

The band's influences steered away from the "traditional hardcore record" and took a wide variety of influences from indie rock bands like Fleet Foxes. Cormier, when asked about his influences, stated: "In a lot of ways we get really inspired by non-metal bands. For me, I find I really like looking at other things because I just don't want to make a traditional hardcore record lyrically. So for me, I listen to a lot of indie rock and I've been getting super psyched on a lot of that, like the new Helplessness Blues by Fleet Foxes".

== Release and promotion ==
The album was initially promoted by an album teaser made by the band in December 2011, revealing that it was planned for an April 2012 release.

The first single planning to support its release "Old Blood" being released. A music video was released for "Old Blood" and was played on Scuzz weeks before release online. On 24 January, Distort Entertainment released the video for the single online. On March 7, 2012 Cancer Bats released a second music video in promotion of the album for the song Road Sick. On April 10, 2012 Cancer Bats uploaded the second track Bricks and Mortar onto YouTube to stream.

Cancer Bats will start the touring cycle for Dead Set on Living with six performances in one day in London, England on April 21, 2012. The venue locations for the mini-tour, dubbed the Pentagram Tour, form a pentagram shape when seen on a map. About the unique structure of the tour, Cormier said, "We've already done three shows in 24 hours—that's now old hat," and that "it's funny that no-one has done this before." All six shows sold out within a week of going on sale. Hassle Records used social media outlets like Twitter to consolidate band and fan interviews and bootleg footage from the tour.

== Critical reception ==
Professional ratings
Aggregate scores
Source	Rating
Metacritic	(75/100)
Review scores
Source	Rating
AbsolutePunk	(76%)
BBC Music	(unfavourable)
Big Cheese	(4/5)
The Fly	4/5 stars
Metal Storm	8.7/10 stars
New Musical Express	(7/10)

Dead Set on Living received generally positive reviews from music critics. At Metacritic, which assigns a normalized rating out of 100 to reviews from mainstream critics, the album received an average score of 75, based on 9 reviews, which indicates "generally favorable reviews"

== Track listing ==
All tracks are written by Liam Cormier, Scott Middleton, Mike Peters and Jaye R. Schwarzer.

No.	Title	Length
1.	"RATS" (featuring Rob Urbinati of Sacrifice)	4:08
2.	"Bricks and Mortar"	3:45
3.	"Road Sick"	2:51
4.	"Breathe Armageddon"	3:47
5.	"Dead Set on Living" (featuring Matty Matheson)	3:06
6.	"The Void"	4:24
7.	"Old Blood"	2:48
8.	"Drunken Physics"	4:08
9.	"Bastards" (featuring Dez Fafara of Coal Chamber and DevilDriver, and Kate Cooper of An Horse)	3:25
10.	"Rally the Wicked"	2:22
11.	"New World Alliance"	4:06
Total length:		38:50

Canadian Re-Issue bonus track (Dead Set On Living II)
No.	Title	Length
12.	"Wolf Clan"	3:56
Total length:		42:46

Dead Set On Living re-issue with Bonus Tracks and Bat Sabbath studio version
No.	Title	Length
12.	"Wolf Clan"	4:04
13.	"The Great Divide"	2:42
14.	"Sonic Mind Assault"	1:41
15.	"Over It"	2:39
16.	"Children of the Grave"	4:44
17.	"Into the Void"	5:28
18.	"Iron Man"	5:33
19.	"Nib"	5:12
20.	"War Pigs"	7:09

== Personnel ==
Cancer Bats

- Liam Cormier – lead vocals
- Scott Middleton – guitar, backing vocals
- Mike Peters – drums, percussion
- Jaye R. Schwarzer – bass guitar, vocals

Additional personnel

- Eric Ratz – production
- Kenny Luong – production

== Release history ==
Country	Date	Label	Format	Catalog number	Source
Europe	April 16, 2012	Hassle Records	CD; Vinyl record	HOFF144	
Canada	April 17, 2012	Distort Entertainment	CD; Vinyl record	DE33	
United States	April 24, 2012	Metal Blade Records	CD; Vinyl record	150952	
