= Hail Destroyer =

Studio album by Cancer Bats
- Released: April 22, 2008
- Genres: Hardcore punk, metalcore, sludge metal
- Length: 37:35
- Labels: Distort, Metal Blade
- Producers: Eric Ratz, Kenny Luong, Greg Below

Cancer Bats chronology
Birthing the Giant (2006)	Hail Destroyer (2008)	Bears, Mayors, Scraps & Bones (2010)

Singles from Hail Destroyer
- 1. "Lucifer's Rocking Chair" Released: November 2, 2008

Hail Destroyer is the second studio album by Canadian hardcore punk band Cancer Bats. It was released on April 22, 2008 by Distort Entertainment in Canada and on June 24, 2008 by Metal Blade Records in the US.

In 2009, Hail Destroyer was reissued in some regions with four bonus tracks (one new song and three cover songs) in addition to a DVD featuring live footage of the Cancer Bats. The bonus tracks were also released separately as an extended play dubbed the Tour EP on June 30, 2009. Videos were filmed for "Hail Destroyer", "Deathsmarch" and "Lucifer's Rocking Chair".

The title track was featured briefly in the 2009 sci-fi horror film Splice.

== Accolades ==
Professional ratings
Review scores
Source	Rating
AllMusic	3.5/5 stars
Alternative Vision	5/5 stars
Punknews.org	4/5 stars
Punktastic.com	4.5/5 stars
Rockmidgets.com	5/5 stars
Toronto Music Scene	4/5 stars
Unglued Reviews	(Positive)

== Track listing ==
No.	Title	Length
1.	"Hail Destroyer"	3:17
2.	"Harem of Scorpions" (featuring Tim McIlrath)	2:47
3.	"Deathsmarch" (featuring Wade MacNeil)	3:36
4.	"Regret"	2:44
5.	"Bastard's Waltz"	3:28
6.	"Sorceress"	2:16
7.	"Lucifer's Rocking Chair"	4:21
8.	"Let It Pour"	2:42
9.	"Smiling Politely" (featuring Ben Kowalewicz)	4:02
10.	"Pray for Darkness"	1:30
11.	"PMA 'Til I'm DOA"	3:03
12.	"Zed's Dead, Baby"	3:50
Total length:		37:35

Reissue bonus tracks and Tour EP
No.	Title	Length
13.	"Engine Skull"	2:38
14.	"Agenda Suicide" (The Faint cover)	2:57
15.	"So Jealous" (Tegan and Sara cover)	2:54
16.	"I Want a Lot Now" (Murder City Devils cover)	3:44
Total length:		49:56

== Personnel ==
Cancer Bats

- Liam Cormier – lead vocals
- Scott Middleton – lead & rhythm guitars, bass, backing vocals
- Mike Peters – drums, percussion, backing vocals

Additional musicians

- Wade MacNeil – guest vocals on "Deathsmarch"
- Ben Kowalewicz – guest vocals on "Smiling Politely"
- Tim McIlrath – guest vocals on "Harem of Scorpions"
- Gang vocals by Jaye Schwarzer, Mike Peters, Scott Middleton, Billy Hamilton, Juice, Travis Porter, xHambonex, Adam Sylvester

Production

- Produced and engineered by Eric Ratz and Kenny Luong
- Mixed by Eric Ratz, Greg Below and Kenny Luong
- Mastered by Scott Lake
- Design and art direction by Doublenaut
- Illustrations by Alex Snelgrove
- "Hail Destroyer" was placed at #3 in Kerrang! magazine's 2008 "End of the Year" list.

== Trivia ==
- The song "Zed's Dead, Baby" is in reference to a line spoken by Bruce Willis' character Butch, in the film Pulp Fiction.

== Reviews ==
- Cancer Bats - Hail Destroyer - CD Review
