= Bears, Mayors, Scraps & Bones =

Studio album by Cancer Bats
- Released: April 13, 2010
- Recorded: 2009
- Studio: Metalworks Studios in Mississauga, Ontario
- Genres: Hardcore punk, sludge metal
- Length: 44:55
- Label: Distort
- Producers: Eric Ratz, Kenny Luong, Cancer Bats

Cancer Bats chronology
Hail Destroyer (2008)	Bears, Mayors, Scraps & Bones (2010)	Dead Set on Living (2012)

Singles from Bears, Mayors, Scraps & Bones
- 1. "Sabotage"/"Scared to Death" Released: March 2, 2010; 2. "Dead Wrong" Released: June 14, 2010

Professional ratings
Aggregate scores
Source	Rating
Metacritic	(82/100)
Review scores
Source	Rating
AllMusic	4/5 stars
BBC	favourable
PopMatters	3/5 stars
Punknews.org	3/5 stars
Thrash Hits	4.5/6 stars
Total Guitar	4/5 stars
Ultimate Guitar Archive	(7.7/10)

Bears, Mayors, Scraps & Bones is the third studio album by Canadian hardcore punk band Cancer Bats. In Canada, it was released on April 13, 2010 through Distort Entertainment. The name of the album derives from each of the members' personal nickname (Mike Peters – Bear; Scott Middleton – Mayor; Liam Cormier – Scraps; Jaye R. Schwarzer – Bones). The first single from the album was "Dead Wrong". A music video was previously made and released for "Sabotage" when it was released on the band's EP Sabotage. Pre-orders of the album included a limited bonus DVD consisting of 2 hours of live footage and the making of the album.

== Track listing ==
All tracks are written by Liam Cormier, Scott Middleton, Mike Peters and Jaye R. Schwarzer.

No.	Title	Length
1.	"Sleep This Away"	3:21
2.	"Trust No One"	2:43
3.	"Dead Wrong"	2:40
4.	"Doomed to Fail"	3:15
5.	"Black Metal Bicycle"	3:32
6.	"We Are the Undead"	2:54
7.	"Scared to Death"	3:22
8.	"Darkness Lives"	3:42
9.	"Snake Mountain"	2:48
10.	"Make Amends"	3:04
11.	"Fake Gold"	2:52
12.	"Drive This Stake"	2:41
13.	"Raised Right"	4:46
14.	"Sabotage" (Beastie Boys cover)	3:01
Total length:		44:55

Japanese edition bonus tracks
No.	Title	Length
15.	"Science Is the Answer"	2:11
16.	"This Town"	3:54
Total length:		50:38

Reissue bonus tracks
No.	Title	Length
15.	"Sleep This Away" (live)
16.	"Trust No One" (live)
17.	"Pray for Darkness" (live)
18.	"Shillelagh" (live)
19.	"Hail Destroyer" (live)
20.	"Darkness Lives" (live)
21.	"Deathsmarch" (live)
22.	"French Immersion" (live)
23.	"Sabotage" (live)
24.	"Lucifer's Rocking Chair" (live)
25.	"Science Is the Answer" (bonus track)	2:11
26.	"This Town" (bonus track)	3:54

== Personnel ==
Cancer Bats

- Liam Cormier – lead vocals
- Scott Middleton – guitars, backing vocals
- Mike Peters – drums
- Jaye R. Schwarzer – bass, backing vocals (Track 4)

Additional personnel

- Eric Ratz – production, engineer, mixing
- Kenny Luong – production, engineer, mixing
- Andrew McCracken – album artwork and layout
- Scott Lake – mastering (at Metalworks Studios in Mississauga, Ontario)
- Dajaun Martineau – additional editing
- Chris Snow – assistant engineer
