= Cancer Bats =

Canadian hardcore punk band

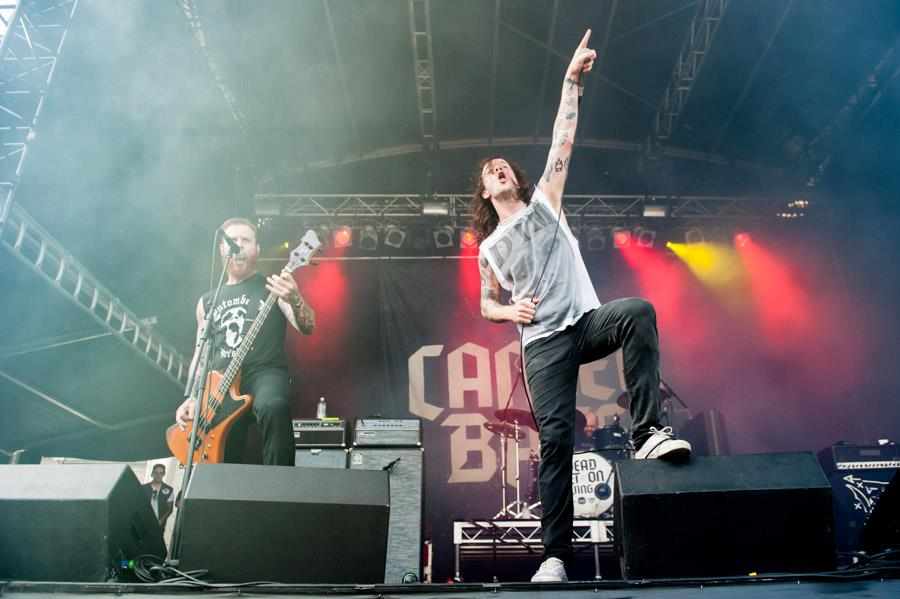
- Cancer Bats live in Sydney in 2013. From left to right: Jaye R. Schwarzer, Liam Cormier and Mike Peters (back).

Background information
- Also known as: Bat Sabbath
- Origin: Toronto, Ontario, Canada
- Genres: Hardcore punk, metalcore, sludge metal
- Years active: 2004-present
- Labels: Hassle, Distort, Metal Blade, Good Fight, New Damage, Bat Skull Records, Marshall Records
- Members: Liam Cormier; Jaye R. Schwarzer; Jackson Landry
- Past members: Mike Peters; Scott Middleton; Joel Bath; Andrew McCracken; Jason Bailey
- Website: www.cancerbats.com

Cancer Bats is a Canadian hardcore punk band from Toronto, Ontario. To date, they have released eight studio albums and six extended plays; with their most recent LP, Give Me Dirt, having been released on August 7, 2026. The band is currently composed of lead vocalist Liam Cormier, bassist and backing vocalist Jaye R. Schwarzer and guitarist Jackson Landry. The members of Cancer Bats have also toured and recorded as a Black Sabbath tribute band under the name Bat Sabbath. Cormier is the only original member as of 2021.

== History ==
=== Early years and Birthing the Giant (2004–2006) ===
Cancer Bats was founded in May 2004 by singer Liam Cormier and guitarist Scott Middleton, a former member of Toronto heavy metal band At the Mercy of Inspiration. The two wanted to make music influenced by artists such as Entombed, Refused, Black Flag, Led Zeppelin and Down, among others. The lineup was completed with the addition of Andrew McCracken on bass and Joel Bath on drums, with Cormier moving to vocals. The four-piece wrote and recorded songs for a self-released demo that saw light in January 2005, and led to Canadian independent record label Distort Entertainment signing the band.

After deciding that a combination of illness and animal name would give the best band name, the band considered the names Cancer Bats and Pneumonia Hawk. Soon after, Mike Peters (cousin of Dann Peters) replaced Bath on the drums and the band began playing throughout Southern Ontario, playing live shows with bands like Billy Talent, Every Time I Die, Nora, Alexisonfire, Haste the Day, It Dies Today, Bane, Comeback Kid, Buried Inside, Attack in Black, Misery Signals, This Is Hell, Rise Against, The Bronx and Gallows.

On June 2, 2006, the band took part in a short interview and then played a free CD release show at The Edge 102.1 (CFNY-FM) and then on June 6 Birthing the Giant was released into major record stores. The album includes guest vocals by George Pettit of Alexisonfire. On June 7, 2006, they hosted All Things Rock, a show on MTV Canada, and had their own video played at the end of the show.

=== Lineup changes and Hail Destroyer (2007–2008) ===
Bass player Andrew McCracken left to concentrate on his design company Doublenaut. His spot was filled in by Jason Bailey (former member of Figure Four and Shattered Realm) for most of 2007. However, Bailey was then replaced by Jaye R. Schwarzer (formerly of Left Behind, Hope to Die, Minesweeper, and Kover) as he wanted to focus on being a graphic designer; he still designs artworks for Cancer Bats and remains friends with Liam Cormier.

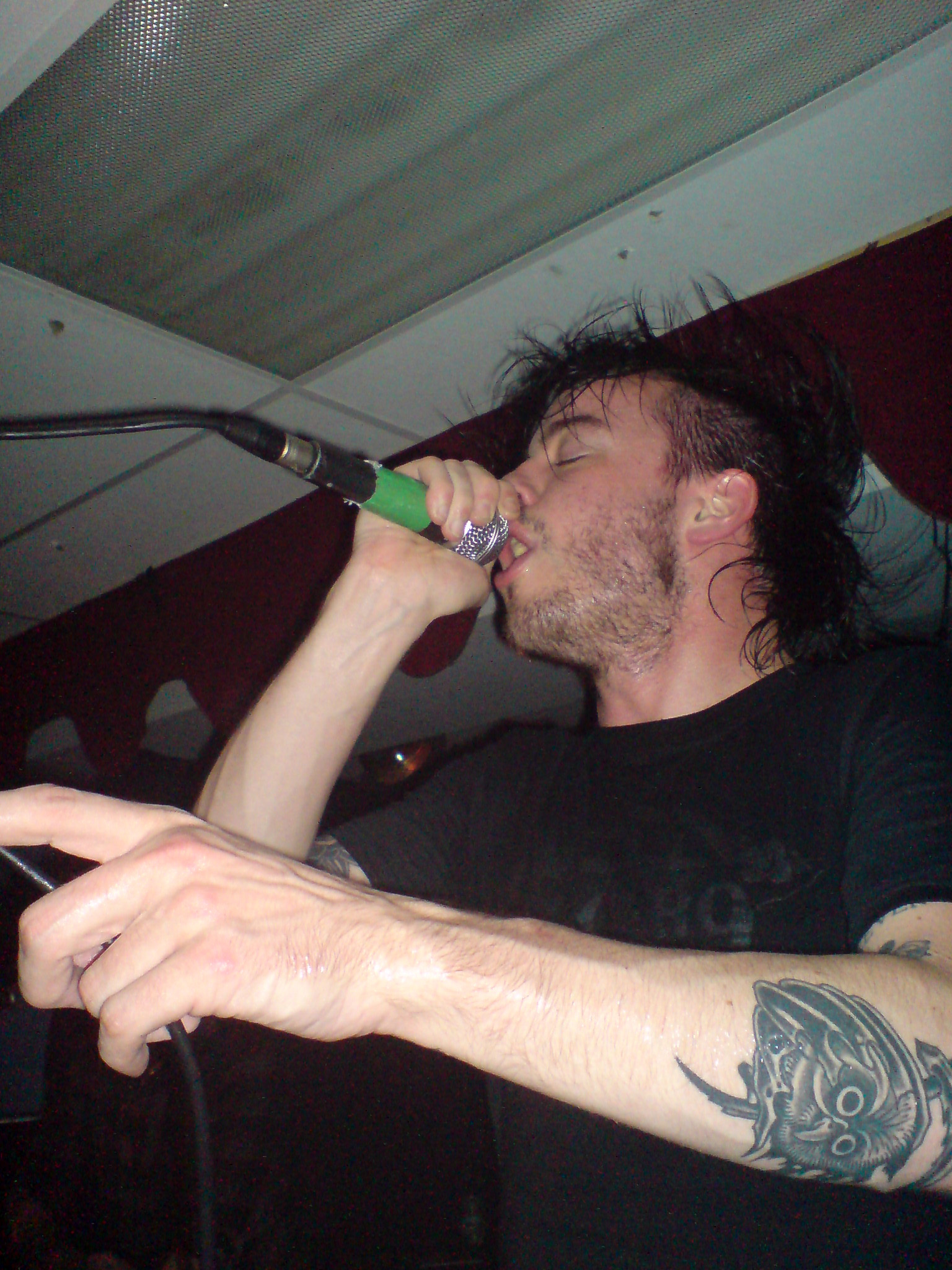
Cormier performing at a Cancer Bats show in Barcelona in June 2008.

The band released their second studio album called Hail Destroyer on April 22, 2008. The album features guest vocals by Wade MacNeil of Alexisonfire and Black Lungs, Tim McIlrath of Rise Against and Ben Kowalewicz of Billy Talent. The release was held at the Mod Club in downtown Toronto with Liam Cormier not only singing for Cancer Bats, but also performing drums for Black Lungs. On May 17, 2008, Cancer Bats were put on the cover of Kerrang!, a publication which gave their album Hail Destroyer a KKKKK review (highest possible) as well as a 5k Live review on their headlining UK tour. Cancer Bats were also nominated for 2008 Album of the Year for the 2008 Kerrang! awards.

Cancer Bats have performed at the Download Festival in 2007, Groezrock 2007 and at both Reading and Leeds Festivals in 2007 and 2008. In the summer of 2008, the band did an extensive summer and autumn tour with Bullet for My Valentine, Black Tide and Bleeding Through, as part of the No Fear music tour across North America. Also in 2008, they were a support act for Welsh band Funeral for a Friend during their tour of Britain and northern Europe.

=== Touring and Bears, Mayors, Scraps, & Bones (2009–2011) ===
In March 2009, they went on tour at the annual Taste of Chaos festival along with Thursday, Four Year Strong, Pierce the Veil and Bring Me the Horizon, keeping a daily blog on their website. At about this time Cancer Bats were also featured in Bring Me the Horizon's video for "Chelsea Smile", in which they appear playing cards in a kitchen. Also in March, Liam Cormier lent his vocals to fellow Canadian band Silverstein's fourth studio album A Shipwreck in the Sand, on the track "Vices".

Cancer Bats returned to the UK in 2009, after Swedish melodic metal band In Flames cancelled their April 2009 concerts, on which Cancer Bats were slated to be main support. The band is also featured on Gallows' latest album Grey Britain on May 2. On August 1, Cancer Bats played a slot at the premier showing of the Sonisphere festival and at the inaugural Hevy Music Festival. Also in 2009, Cancer Bats appeared in an episode of the documentary series City Sonic, reflecting on their time at the Adrift Clubhouse. In October and November, the band supported Billy Talent on their UK and European tour. During the tour they performed several new songs from their third album, including "Darkness" and "Scared to Death".

In January and February 2010, the band toured the US supporting Anti-Flag. Following that tour they joined fellow Canadians Billy Talent, Alexisonfire and the American band Against Me! on a tour across Canada throughout March. Cancer Bats released their third album Bears, Mayors, Scraps & Bones on April 12 in the UK. On March, the band did a track by track talk with Rock Sound. A music video was shot for their cover of the Beastie Boys song "Sabotage", a track recorded for the album. In September of the same year they opened for Bring Me the Horizon on their UK tour along with Tek One.

In late 2011, Cancer Bats toured Canada as a Black Sabbath tribute band under the moniker "Bat Sabbath". The concept started at Sonisphere Festival on July 10, 2011, when the band was asked to do an after-party show, on top of their initial set in the afternoon, in the tent stage after Slipknot played the main stage. The dates they performed at for the Sonisphere were the last dates they did before they stopped to work on a follow-up to their third studio album. After the performances at the various Sonisphere dates they did a 12 date Canadian tour in December 2011 centred around the Black Sabbath tribute.

=== Dead-set on Living (2012–2014) ===
The band announced that the fourth album is titled Dead Set on Living, which was released on April 16, 2012. Cancer Bats had stated that they desired to create a more "upbeat" follow-up to their previous album Bears, Mayors, Scraps & Bones.

The band's influence steered away from the "traditional hardcore record" and took a wide variety of influences from rock bands including Fleet Foxes. Liam Cormier when asked about his influences stated: "In a lot of ways we get really inspired by non-metal bands. For me, I find I really like looking at other things because I just don't want to make a traditional hardcore record lyrically. So for me, I listen to a lot of indie rock and I've been getting super psyched on a lot of that, like the new 'Helplessness Blues' by Fleet Foxes".

On January 24, Distort Entertainment released the video for the single "Old Blood" online. On March 7, 2012, Cancer Bats released a second music video in promotion of the album for the song "Road Sick". Cancer Bats announced that they would play several release shows on April 21, 2012. They have aimed to play six shows at five different venues across London, United Kingdom, in the shape of a pentagram in promotion of their fourth album.

=== Searching for Zero (2015–2019) ===
Cancer Bats's fifth studio album, Searching for Zero, was released on March 10, 2015. The band posted the song "Arsenic" off the album on YouTube. A post on their official site stated the reason for the band being silent for quite some time: "For those of you who didn't know, the reason we've been gone for so long was to craft our 5th full length! We worked our asses off making a serious banger that we could all party the fuck out of! We even went down to Venice Beach to record with Ross Robinson so it would sound extra dope…..which it does!"

The band released their sixth studio album titled The Spark That Moves on April 20, 2018. In September 2019, they would perform alongside American hardcore punk band Sharptooth and Canadian punk rock band Single Mothers.

=== Scott Middleton's departure (2020) ===
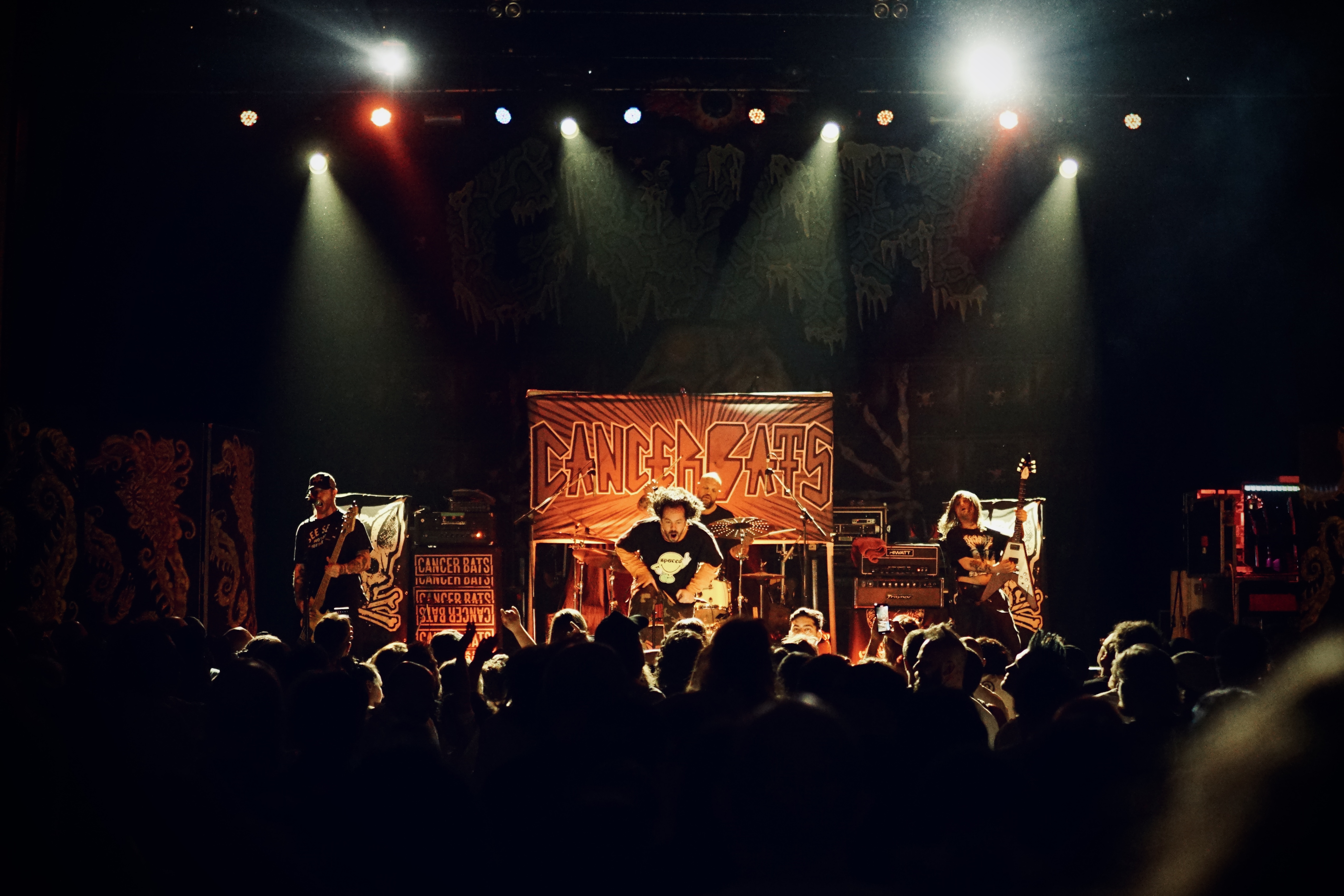
Cancer Bats performing in 2024

On October 4, 2021, the band announced via their Facebook and Instagram pages that founding member and guitarist Scott Middleton would be departing the band to focus on his family, health, and to pursue personal interests in recording, mixing, and mastering music out of his own studio. Bassist Jaye Schwarzer took over guitar duties on studio. As of Middleton's departure, Liam Cormier remains as the only original member of the band.

=== Psychic Jailbreak (2022) ===
The band released their seventh studio album, Psychic Jailbreak, on April 15, 2022, via Bat Skull Records. This was the first album that the band recorded as a three-piece, with Jaye Schwarzer recording most guitar parts. In a Kerrang! article, Cormier shared a track-by-track guide to each track on the album which explained the meaning behind the lyrics and how the track was written.

=== Give Me Dirt and Mike Peters' departure (2026–present) ===
The band's eighth studio album, Give Me Dirt, was released on August 7, 2026, through Marshall Records. The artwork was created by Liam Cormier in mixed media collage style.

On September 23, 2026, Mike Peters announced through his personal Facebook page that he would be stepping down from being the band's drummer, most notably for touring, to focus on his family and raising his children. He stated that he would remain involved with the band "behind the scenes" with writing and recording, but his role will be filled by Ian Romano .

== Recordings ==
The band have released eight albums. Birthing the Giant was their first full-length album. It was released on June 6, 2006, by Distort Entertainment in Canada and September 5, 2006, by Abacus Recordings in the US. Videos were shot for "100 Grand Canyon", "French Immersion" and "Pneumonia Hawk". Hail Destroyer was the band's second full-length album. It was released on April 22, 2008, by Distort Entertainment in Canada and on June 24, 2008, by Metal Blade Records in the US. Bears, Mayors, Scraps & Bones was released on April 13, 2010, through Distort Entertainment in Canada. The name of the album derives from each of the band members personal nickname (Mike - Bear; Scott - Mayor; Liam - Scraps; Jaye - Bones).

They have also released seven singles and EPs. Cancer Bats was the first EP by the band. It was produced and engineered by guitarist Scott Middleton. This EP was sold at all the live shows leading up until the release of Cancer Bats's first album Birthing the Giant and later repressed as a 7" record by Tragicomedy Records. This is Hell/Cancer Bats was a limited release 7" vinyl EP shared with the This Is Hell band. Each band contributes one new song, and one cover song of the other band. Rolo Tomassi/Cancer Bats was a split release with the band Rolo Tomassi in 2009. The songs were recorded and released at the beginning of 2009 on to a limited amount of black 7" vinyl through Hassle Records. The vinyl is strictly limited to 300 copies and was only available through each artist's shows, and Rolo Tomassi's 'Subs Club' 7" (2009). Cancer Bats also released the Tour EP (2009). On March 2, 2010, Cancer Bats released the Sabotage EP. Its name is derived from their cover of the Beastie Boys' song "Sabotage". The band has also shot a music video for the song that premiered on February 16 through the band's MySpace page. In 2019 New Damage records released a split 7 inch vinyl record called : New Damage Records Switcheroo series vol 1, where Cancer Bats and Single Mothers cover each other's songs. Single Mothers cover the song Road Sick from Dead Set On Living, while Cancer Bats cover Dog Parks / Switch Off. The Cancer Bats side was recorded while on tour in Belgium in 2019 at House Rott Child by Scott Middleton who also mixed the songs.

== Musical style ==
Cancer Bats take a wide variety of influences from heavy metal sub-genres and fuse them into hardcore and punk rock, and also include elements of southern metal. Their sound has been likened to sludge metal, as well as to that of metalcore bands such as Converge and Hatebreed.

== Band members ==
Band members at Metal Frenzy open air 2026

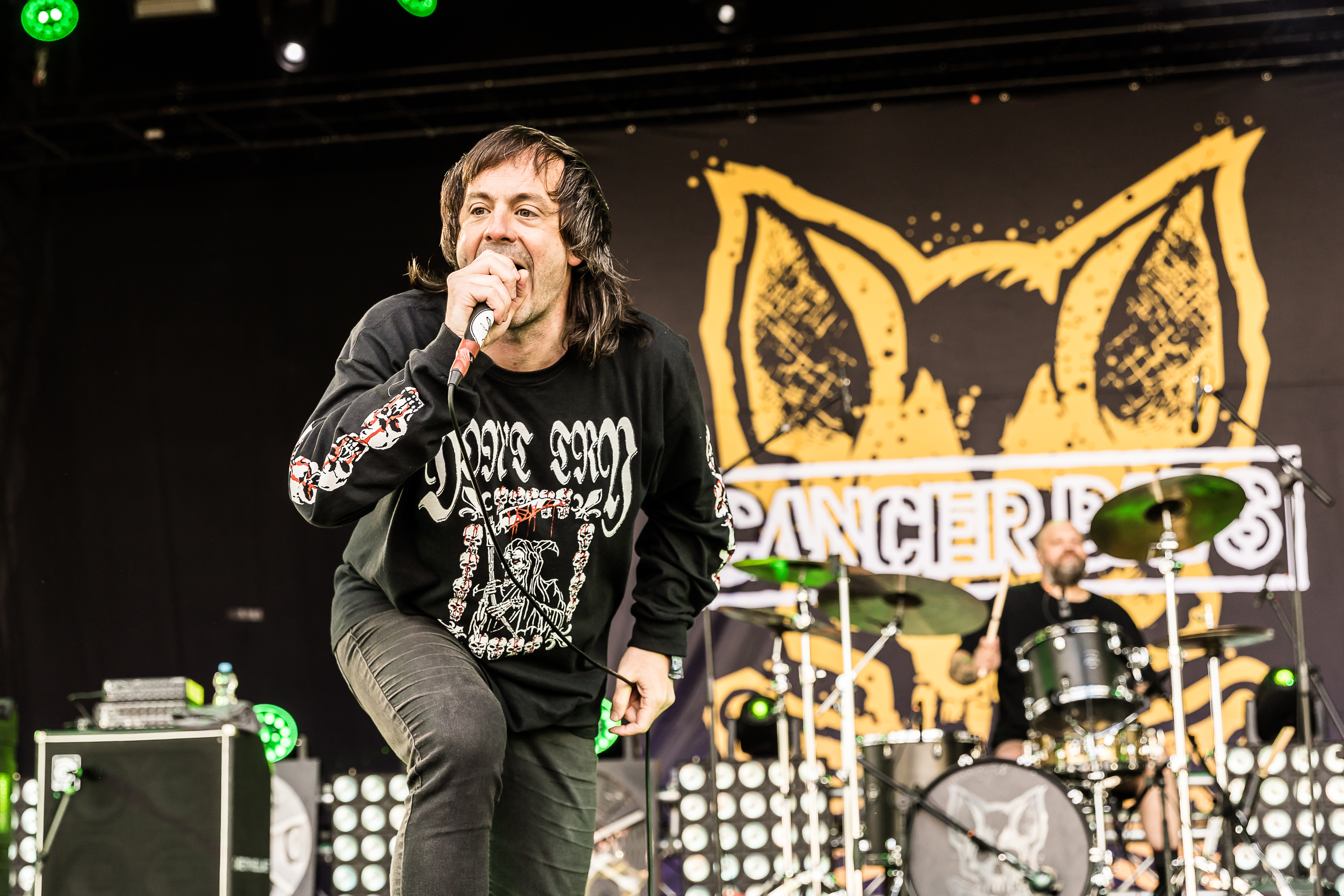
Liam Cormier, vocals

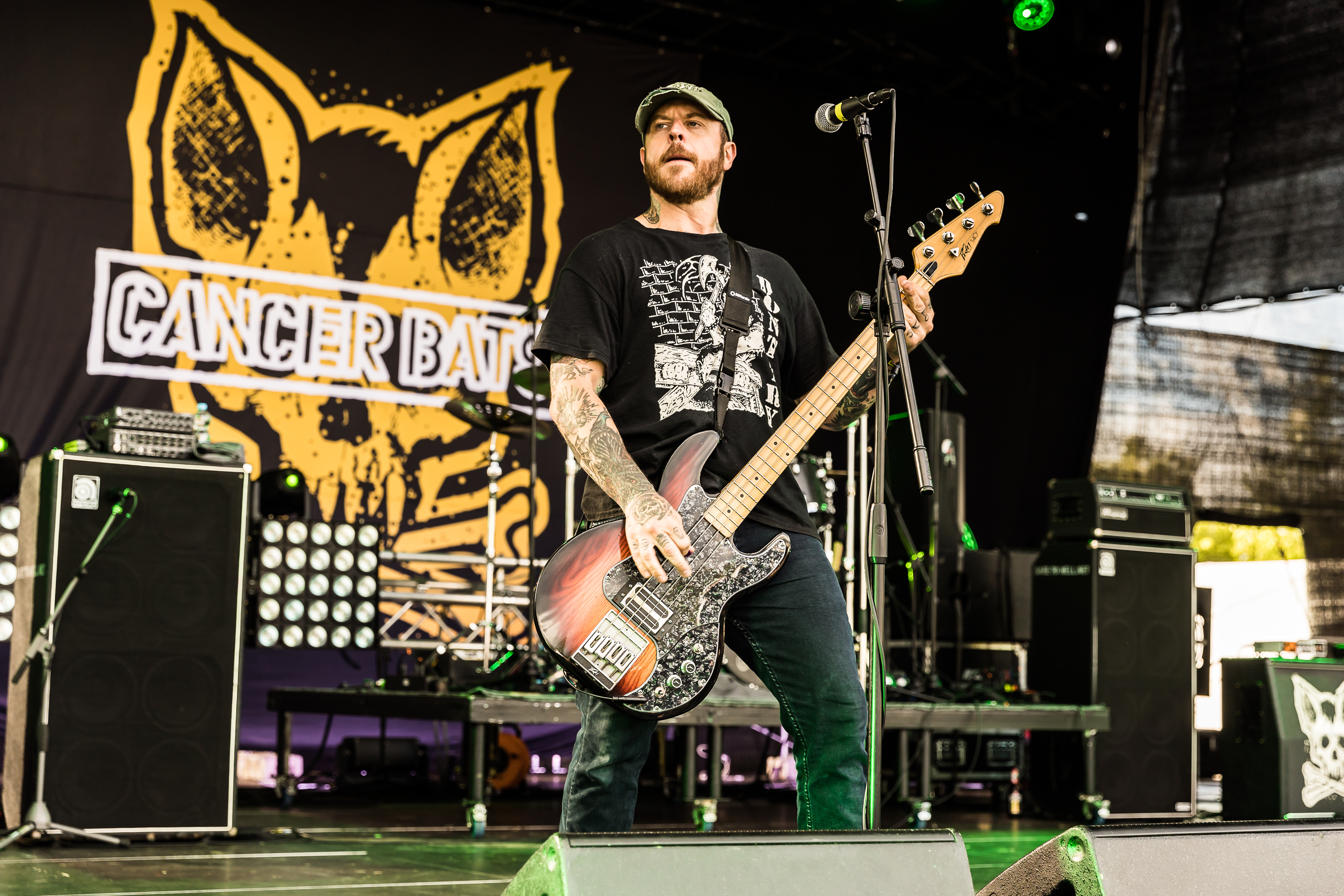
Jaye R. Schwarzer, bass

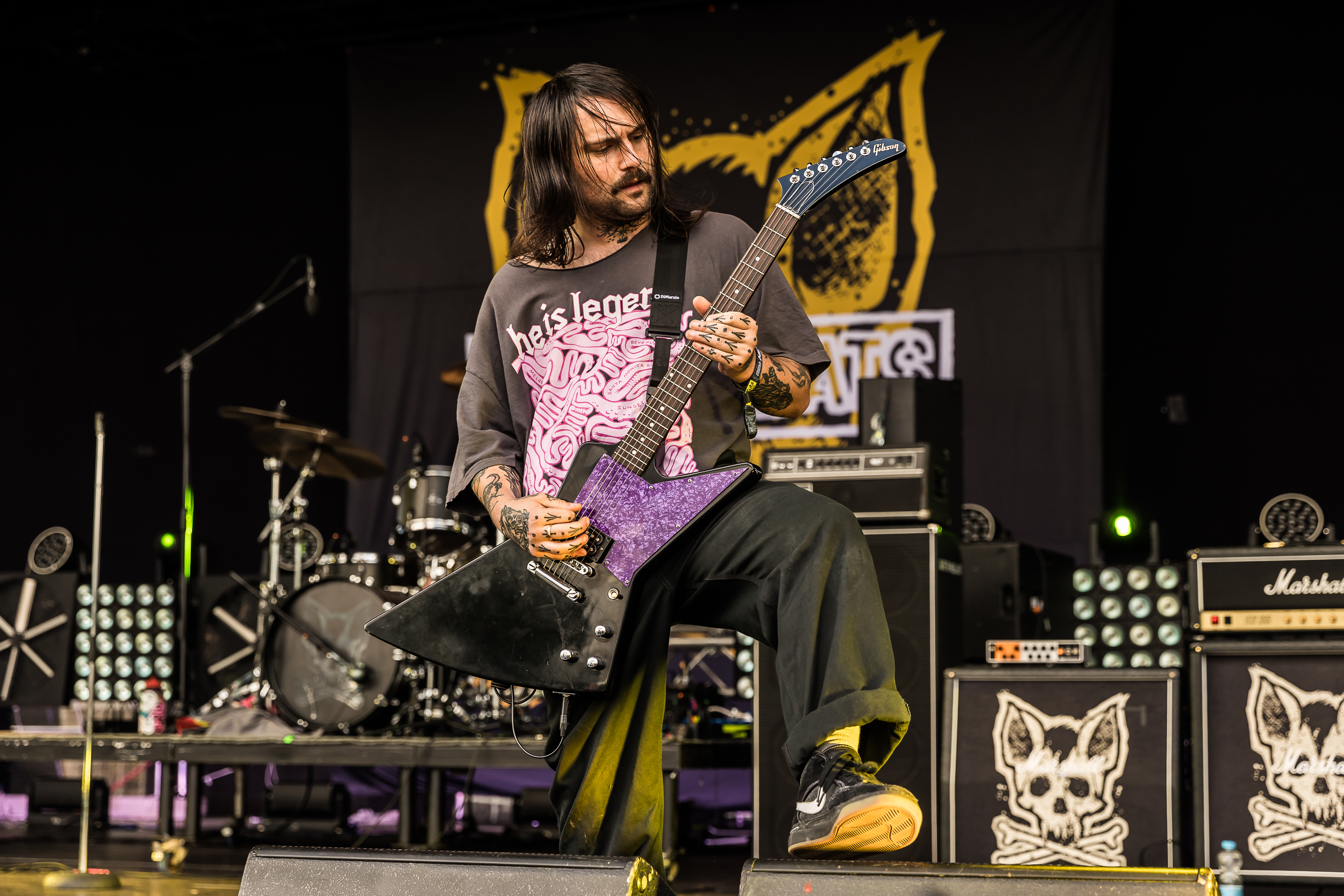
Jackson Landry, guitar

Current members

- Liam Cormier – lead vocals (2004–present), drums, percussion (2004)
- Jaye R. Schwarzer – bass, backing vocals (2007–present), guitar (2021–2023)
- Jackson Landry – guitar (2023–present)

Current touring musicians

- Ian Romano – drums (2026–present)

Former members

- Joel Bath – drums, percussion (2004–2005)
- Andrew McCracken – bass (2004–2006)
- Scott Middleton – guitar, backing vocals (2004–2021)
- Mike Peters – drums, percussion (2005–2026)
- Jason Bailey – bass (2006–2007)

Former touring musicians

- Wade MacNeil – guitar, backing vocals (2019)
- Nick Sherman – guitar (2022)
- Stephen Harrison – guitar (2022–2023)
- KT Lamond – guitar (2022–2023)
- Allan Harding – drums (2024–2026)

== Discography ==
Studio albums

- Birthing the Giant (2006)
- Hail Destroyer (2008)
- Bears, Mayors, Scraps, & Bones (2010)
- Dead Set on Living (2012)
- Searching for Zero (2015)
- The Spark That Moves (2018)
- Psychic Jailbreak (2022)
- Give Me Dirt (2026)

=== EPs ===
- 2005: Cancer Bats EP
- 2007: This is Hell/Cancer Bats 7"
- 2009: Rolo Tomassi/Cancer Bats
- 2009: Tour EP
- 2010: Sabotage EP
- 2011: Cancer Bats/Black Lungs
- 2013: Bat Sabbath EP
- 2019: New Damage Records Switcheroo Vol 1. : Cancer Bats/Single Mothers
- 2020: You'll never break us // Separation Sessions Vol. 1
- 2021: You'll never break us // Separation Sessions Vol. 2

== Nominations ==
Year	Award	Category	Nominee/Work	Result	Ref
2019	Juno Award	Metal/Hard Music Album of the Year	The Spark That Moves	Nominated	
2016	Juno Award	Metal/Hard Music Album of the Year	Searching for Zero	Nominated	
2013	Juno Award	Metal/Hard Music Album of the Year	Dead Set on Living	Nominated	
2011	Juno Award	Rock Album of the Year	Bears, Mayors, Scraps & Bones	Nominated	
2009	Juno Award	New Group of the Year	Cancer Bats	Nominated	
