= List of bands from Canada =

This is a list of bands from Canada. Only bands appear here; individual musicians are listed at list of Canadian musicians.

== 0-9 ==
- 11:30 (1999–2001)
- 13 Engines (1985–1997)
- 1755 (1975–present)
- 1977 (2004–2015)
- 2Frères (2008–present)
- The 20/20 Project (2010–2015)
- 22nd Century (2007–2018)
- The 222s (1978–1982)
- 2preciious (1994–1996)
- 3 Inches of Blood (1999–2015)
- 3's a Crowd (1964–1969)
- The 3tards (2001–2009)
- 54-40 (1981–)
- 78th Fraser Highlanders Pipe Band (1982–)
- 78th Highlanders (Halifax Citadel) Pipe Band (1983–)
- 88Glam (2017–)

== A ==
- A-Game (2007–)
- Abandon All Ships (2006–2014)
- The Abrams (2004–)
- Absolutely Free (2011–)
- Acid Test (1990–1994, 2018–)
- The Acorn (2003–2017)
- Acres of Lions (2006–)
- Actors (2012–)
- Ad Vielle Que Pourra (1986–1999)
- Adam and the Amethysts (2004–2012)
- Adventure Club (2011–)
- Aerial (1973–1981)
- Aerialists (2014–present)
- African Guitar Summit (2004–2017)
- Afrikana Soul Sister
- Afrodizz (2002–)
- AfroNubians (1992–1998)
- After the Anthems (2006–2011)
- The Afterimage (2011–2018)
- Age of Days (2005–)
- The Age of Electric (1989–1998, 2015–)
- The Agonist (2004–)
- AIDS Wolf (2003–2012)
- Air Traffic Control (1993–)
- Akuma (1998–2008)
- Alabama (1973)
- Alaclair Ensemble (2008–)
- Alberta Caledonia Pipe Band (1982–2013)
- Alert the Medic (2006–)
- Alexisonfire (2001–2012, 2015–)
- Alias (1988–1991, 2009)
- All Hands Make Light (2020–present)
- All Systems Go! (1998–2006)
- Alpha Galates (2001–2011)
- Alta Moda (1979–1988)
- Altameda (2016–present)
- Alvvays (2011)
- Amati Quartet (2003–2018)
- Ambush (1993–)
- Amos the Transparent (2007–)
- Anagram (2002–2012)
- Anciients (2011–)
- André (2001–2009)
- Anemone (2015)
- Angine de Poitrine (2019–)
- The Angstones (1990–1998)
- Annex String Quartet (2008–)
- Annihilator (1984–)
- Anonymus (1989–)
- Another Joe (1995–2001)
- Antiquus (2000–2011)
- Anvil (1973–)
- Anyday (2009–2011)
- Apollo Ghosts (2009–2013)
- Apostle of Hustle (2001–2009)
- Appleton (2002–2005)
- An April March (1989–1999)
- April Wine (1969–1986, 1992–)
- Arcade Fire (2000–)
- Archspire (2007–)
- Argonotes (1995–2017)
- The Argues (2010–)
- Arise and Ruin (2005–2010)
- Arkaea (2008−2012)
- Arkells (2006–)
- Arm's Length (2019–)
- Armed and Hammered (1989–)
- Armistice (2010–2011)
- The Arrogant Worms (1991–)
- The Arrows (1981–1986)
- Art of Dying (2004–)
- Art of Time Ensemble (1998–)
- Article One (2003–2011)
- Artificial Joy Club (1993–1999)
- The Artist Life (2005–2012)
- As the Poets Affirm (2001–2007)
- Asexuals (1983–)
- Ash & Bloom (2013–2015)
- Ashes of Soma (2003–)
- At the Mercy of Inspiration (2000–2004)
- Atach Tatuq (1998–2007)
- Atlantic Symphony Orchestra (1968–1983)
- Atlas Strategic (2000–2002)
- Atomic 7 (1998–2007)
- Attack in Black (2003–2010)
- Audio Playground (2009–)
- Augury (2002–)
- Austra (2009–)
- Aut'Chose (1974–)
- Autorickshaw (2003–)
- Autumn Hill (2012–2017)
- Avataar (2015–)
- Avec pas d'casque (2004–)
- The Awkward Stage (2006–2009)
- Axis of Advance (1998–2008)
- Ayrad (2008–)
- Azari & III (2008–2013)
- Azeda Booth (2004–2011)

== B ==
- B-Girls (1977–1982)
- B2Krazy (1999–2001)
- B4-4 (1999–2004)
- Baby Blue Soundcrew (1995–2002)
- Baby Jey (2015–)
- Bach-Elgar Choir (1905–)
- Bachman & Turner (2009–2018)
- Bachman–Turner Overdrive (1973–1979, 1983–2005)
- Backburner (2001–)
- Bad Flirt (2002–2009)
- BadBadNotGood (2010–)
- Badge Époque Ensemble (2019–)
- The Balconies (2007–)
- The Band (1968–1977, 1983–1999)
- Banlieue Rouge (1989–1998)
- Banned from Atlantis (1990–1995)
- Banx & Ranx (2014–)
- Baptists (2010–)
- Baptized in Blood (2004–2012)
- Barachois (1995–2003)
- Barcelona Pavilion (2001–2005)
- Barenaked Ladies (1988–)
- Barley Bree (1973–1995)
- The Barmitzvah Brothers (2000–)
- Barney Bentall and the Legendary Hearts (1980–)
- The Barr Brothers (2006–)
- The Barra MacNeils (1980–)
- Barrage (1996–2012)
- Barstool Prophets (1989–1999)
- Basement Revolver (2016–)
- Bass is Base (1993–1997)
- Battered Wives (1976–1980)
- Battle of Santiago (2011–)
- The Be Good Tanyas (1999–)
- The Beaches (2013–)
- Beams (2012–)
- Bear Mountain (2012–2018)
- Bearfoot (1972–1975)
- Beast (2006–2010)
- Beau Dommage (1972–1978 etc)
- The Beau Marks (1958–1963)
- The Beauties (2006–)
- The Beckoning (2010–2018)
- Bedouin Soundclash (2001–)
- Beija Flor (2003–2010)
- Belgrave (2009–2016)
- Bell Orchestre (1999–)
- Bell Tower (2009–2017)
- Bella (2003–2011)
- The Belle Game (2009–2020)
- The Bells (1965–1973)
- Belvedere (1995–)
- Bend Sinister (2001–)
- Beneath the Massacre (2004–)
- Benz & MD (2003–2010)
- Beòlach (1998–)
- Bernice (2011–)
- The Besnard Lakes (2003–)
- Bet.e & Stef (1995–2017)
- Beyond Creation (2005–)
- Beyond the Pale (1998–)
- Bibi Club (2019–present)
- The Bicycles (2001–)
- Big Black Lincoln (2003–2006)
- Big Brave
- Big Dirty Band (2006)
- Big House (1987–1992)
- Big Sugar (1988–)
- Big Wreck (1994–)
- Bike for Three! (2007–)
- The Bills (1996–)
- Billy Talent (1993–)
- Billy Thunderkloud & the Chieftones (1964–1991)
- Bionic (1998–2007)
- Birds of Wales (2005–2011)
- Birth Through Knowledge (1993–1999)
- The Birthday Massacre (1999–)
- Bison B.C. (2006–)
- BKS (1990–1997)
- Black Bear (2000–)
- The Black Halos (1993–)
- Black Light Orchestra (1977–1979)
- Black Lungs (2005–)
- The Black Maria (2003–2007)
- Black Moor (2005–)
- Black Mountain (2004–)
- Black Ox Orkestar (2000–2006)
- Black Tiger Sex Machine (2011–)
- Blackberry Wood (2006–)
- Blackburn Brothers (1996–)
- Blackguard (2001–)
- Blackie and the Rodeo Kings (1996–)
- Blanket Barricade (2011–)
- Blasphemy (1984–)
- Bleeker (2003–)
- Blessed by a Broken Heart (2003–2014)
- Bleu Jeans Bleu (2012–)
- Blimp Rock (2012–)
- Blind Witness (2005–)
- Blinker the Star (1992–)
- Blitz//Berlin (2014–)
- Blood Ceremony (2006–)
- Blood Meridian (2004)
- Bloody Chicletts (1995–1997)
- Blou (1994–)
- Blue Daven's Code (2010–2016)
- Blue Hawaii (2010–)
- Blue Monday (2001–2006)
- Blue Moon Marquee (2010s–present)
- Blue Northern (1977–1983)
- Blue Peter (1978–2011)
- Blue Rodeo (1984–)
- The Blue Shadows (1992–1996)
- Blurtonia (1999–2002)
- Bob Moses (2012–)
- Bob's Your Uncle (1985–1993)
- Bobby Kris & The Imperials (1963–1967)
- Bobby Taylor & the Vancouvers (1968–1973)
- Bobs and Lolo (2003–)
- Bocce (2005–2016)
- Bodega (1996–2001)
- Bodh'aktan (2011–)
- Bombs Over Providence (2001–2006)
- Bond (1970–1979)
- Bonjay (2010–)
- Bonjour Brumaire (2007–2010)
- Booji Boys (2016–)
- The Boom Chucka Boys (2010–)
- Boombox Saints (2008–2014)
- The Boomers (1991–2002)
- The Boomtang Boys (1991–)
- Bootsauce (1989–1996)
- Borealis (2005–)
- Born Dead Icons (1998–2007)
- Born Ruffians (2004–)
- Boss Brass (1967–1999)
- Bossanova (1995–2011)
- La Bottine Souriante (1976–)
- Boulevard (1983–)
- Bourbon Tabernacle Choir (1985–1995)
- Bowfire (2000–2015)
- Bowser and Blue (1978–)
- The Box (1981–)
- Boxer the Horse (2010–2013)
- Boy (2002–2008)
- Boys Brigade (1980–1984)
- Boys Night Out (2001–2016)
- Braided (2005–2008)
- Braids (2006–)
- Bran Van 3000 (1996–)
- Brand New Unit (1991–2000)
- Brandon Paris Band (2002–2010)
- The Brass Action (2007–2020)
- Brasse-Camarade (1991–1999)
- BrassMunk (1997–2008)
- Brasstronaut (2008–2017)
- The Brat Attack (2002–2009)
- Brave Belt (1971–1972)
- Breach of Trust (1994–2013)
- Breached (2010–2015)
- Les Breastfeeders (1999–)
- Breeding Ground (1981–1990)
- Brighton Rock (1982–)
- The British North American Act (1968–1972)
- Broken Social Scene (1999–)
- The Bros. Landreth (2013–)
- Brother (1969–1971)
- The Brothers Creeggan (1992–2003)
- The Brothers-in-Law (1963–1970)
- Brown Brigade (2003–2009)
- Bruce Peninsula (2006–)
- Brundlefly (1996–2002)
- Brutal Knights (2003–2010)
- Bruthers of Different Muthers (2008–2015)
- Brutus (1969–1978)
- Buck N' Nice (2012–)
- Buddy Wasisname and the Other Fellers (1983–)
- Bullmoose (1996–2008)
- Bunchofuckingoofs (1983–2001)
- Bündock (1979–2009)
- Buried Inside (1997–2010)
- The Burning Hell (2006–)
- Burning Love (2007–2015)
- Burnstick (2015–)
- Burnt Project 1 (2001–)
- Burnthe8track (2001–2008)
- Bush (1970–1971)
- Busty and the Bass (2011–)
- Butterfinger (2001–2004)
- The Buttless Chaps (1998–2009)
- By Divine Right (1989–)

== C ==
- Cadence (1998–)
- Caïman Fu (2003–)
- Calgary Boys' Choir (1973–)
- Calgary Opera (1973–)
- Calgary Philharmonic Orchestra (1955–)
- Calpurnia (2017–2019)
- Calvin, Don't Jump! (1999–)
- Cameo Blues Band (1978–1990)
- Camouflage Nights (2005–)
- Canadian Bandurist Capella (2001–)
- Canadian Brass (1970–)
- Canadian Chamber Choir (1999–)
- Canadian Children's Opera Company (1968–)
- Canadian Electronic Ensemble (1971–)
- Canadian Grenadier Guards Band (1913–)
- Canadian Opera Company (1950–)
- The Canadian Sweethearts (1958–1977)
- Canadian Zephyr (1969–1983)
- Cancer Bats (2004–)
- Candi & The Backbeat (1988–1991)
- Candy Coated Killahz (2007–2011)
- Cannon Bros. (2010–)
- CANO (1975–1985)
- The Cansecos (2003–)
- The Cape May (2003–)
- Capitol 6 (2011–2013)
- Captain Tractor (1993–)
- The Cardboard Brains (1977–2010)
- Carlton Showband (1963–1996)
- Carmen and Camille (2006–)
- The Carnations (1995–2004)
- Career Suicide (2001–)
- The Carnival Band (1997–)
- The Carpet Frogs (1993–)
- The Carps (2005–2010)
- Carried Away (2000–2009)
- Cartel Madras (2017–)
- Cartoon Lizard (2015–)
- The Cash Brothers (1996–)
- Casper Skulls (2015–)
- Cassie and Maggie
- Cats Can Fly (1982–1987)
- Catuvolcus (2007–2014)
- Cauldron (2006–)
- Caveboy (2015–)
- CBC Radio Orchestra (1938–2008)
- CBC Symphony Orchestra (1952–1964)
- CBC Winnipeg Orchestra (1947–1984)
- CCMC (1974–)
- The Celestics (2011–)
- Celtae (2001–2008)
- Central Band of the Canadian Armed Forces (1940–)
- Ceramic Hello (1980–)
- CerAmony (2002–)
- Chai Folk Ensemble (1964–)
- Chalk Circle (1982–)
- Change of Heart (1982–)
- Chango Family (2000–)
- Chapeaumelon (2001–)
- Chelsea Bridge (1992–)
- Chéri (1982–1983)
- Chester (1972–1977)
- Chic Gamine (2007–)
- La Chicane (1993–)
- Chicklet (1995–)
- Les Chiens (1997–)
- Chilliwack (1970–)
- Chimo! (1969–1971)
- Chixdiggit (1991–)
- Choir! Choir! Choir! (2011–)
- The Choir Practice (2005–)
- Choke (1994–2007)
- Chokehold (1990–)
- Chor Leoni Men's Choir (1992–)
- Chore (1995–2004, 2010)
- The Choristers (1936–1974)
- Choses Sauvages
- Chris Brown and Kate Fenner (1996–2005)
- Chris Buck Band (2013–)
- Christian Hansen & The Autistics (2007–)
- Chromeo (2002–)
- Chucky Danger Band (2004–2008)
- Cities in Dust (2003–)
- Citizen Kane (1995–2005)
- The City Harmonic (2009–2017)
- City Opera of Vancouver (2006–)
- The City Streets (2005–2013)
- CLARK the band (1999–2007)
- Clarknova (1998–2003)
- Cleopatrick (2015–)
- Clever Hopes (2022–)
- The Cliks (2004–)
- Closer to Found (2014–)
- Closet Monster (1997–2005)
- Closure (2002–2006)
- Clues (2007–2011)
- Clumsy Lovers (1993–)
- C'mon (2003–2011)
- The Co-Dependents (1998–2004)
- The Coast (2004–2010)
- Coastal Sound Music Academy (1989–)
- Cobblestone Jazz (2002–)
- The Cocksure Lads (2010–)
- Code Pie (2005–)
- Còig (2010–)
- Cold Creek County (2014–)
- Collapsing Opposites (2002–)
- The Collectors (1961–1969)
- Les Colocs (1990–2000)
- The Color
- Comeback Kid (2000–)
- Common Grackle (2010–)
- Coney Hatch (1982–)
- Conservatory String Quartet (1929–1946)
- The Consonant C (2005–)
- Constantines (1999–)
- Contrived (2000–2010)
- controller.controller (2002–2006)
- cootie catcher (2021-present)
- Cookie Duster (1999–)
- The Cooper Brothers (1974–)
- Copperpenny (1965–1978)
- Copyright (1987–2002)
- Corb Lund and the Hurtin' Albertans (1995–)
- Corbeau (1977–1984)
- Corey and Trina (1973–1998)
- Corky and the Juice Pigs (1987–1998)
- The Corn Sisters (1998–2002)
- Corridor (2013–)
- Corrupt Leaders (2013–2016)
- The Cottars (2000–)
- The Countdown Singers (1994–)
- Counterparts (2007–)
- County Town Singers (1967–)
- Courage My Love (2009–2020)
- The Courtneys (2010–)
- Cousins (2006–)
- Les Cousins Branchaud (1993–)
- Cowboy Junkies (1986–)
- Les Cowboys Fringants (1995–)
- CPC Gangbangs (2001–2008)
- Crack Cloud (2015–)
- Crack of Dawn (1975–)
- Crash Adams
- Crash Karma (2008–)
- Crash Kills Five (1984–)
- Crash Parallel (2005–2014)
- Crash Test Dummies (1988–)
- Crash Vegas (1988–1996)
- Creaking Tree String Quartet (2004–2011)
- Creature (2004–)
- The Creeping Nobodies (2001–2009)
- The Creepshow (2005–)
- The Crew-Cuts (1952–1964)
- Criollo (2003–)
- Critical Mass (1996–)
- Crowbar (1970–1975)
- Crown Lands (2016–present)
- Crush (2000–2006)
- Crush Luther (2004–2011)
- The Cruzeros (1996–)
- Cry of the Afflicted (2003–2008)
- Cryptopsy (1988–)
- Crystal Castles (2006–2017)
- Cub (1992–1997)
- Cuff the Duke (2001–)
- Cunter (2009–)
- Current Swell (2005–)
- Cursed (2001–2008)

== D ==
- D.b.s. (1992–2001)
- D-Cru (1998–2002)
- D.O.A. (1978–)
- Daddy's Hands (1996–2006)
- Daggermouth (2004–)
- The Daggers (1997–2006)
- Dakona (1997–2004)
- Dala (2002–)
- The Damn Truth (2012–)
- Dance Appeal (1990)
- Daniel Band (1979–)
- Danko Jones (1996–)
- The Danks (2005–)
- The Darcys (2007–)
- The Dardanelles (2005–)
- Dark Covenant (2009–)
- The Darkest of the Hillside Thickets (1992–)
- The Darling DeMaes (2007–)
- Darlings of Chelsea (2008–)
- Data Romance (2009–2014)
- The Dave Howard Singers (1981–)
- Dayglo Abortions (1979–)
- DD/MM/YYYY (2003–2011)
- Dead and Divine (2003–2012)
- Dead Brain Cells (1986–)
- Dead Celebrity Status (2003–)
- Dead Hollywood Stars (2000–2005)
- Dead Jesus (1998–2011)
- Dead Letter Dept. (2001–2008)
- Dead Messenger (2005–)
- Dead Obies (2011–)
- The Dead South (2012–)
- Deadly Apples (2004–)
- The Deadly Snakes (1996–2006)
- Dean Lickyer (2004–2011)
- Dear Criminals (2010s–present)
- Dear Jane, I... (2003–2007)
- Dear Rouge (2012–)
- The Dears (1995–)
- Death from Above 1979 (2001–)
- Debs and Errol (2011–2015)
- Decoded Feedback (1993–)
- Decree (1991–)
- The Deep Dark Woods (2005–)
- Default (1999–2013, 2018–2020)
- The DeFranco Family (1972–2000)
- Deja Voodoo (1981–1990)
- Delerium (1987–)
- Delhi 2 Dublin (2006–)
- Deliverance (1974–1981)
- The Demics (1977–1980)
- Demon's Claws (2003–)
- Desert Dolphins (1993–1997)
- Desire (2009–)
- Despised Icon (2002–2010, 2014–)
- Despistado (2001–2013)
- Destroid (2012–2017)
- Destroyalldreamers (2002–2007)
- Destroyer (1995–)
- The Details (2006–)
- Le Diable à Cinq
- The Diableros (2004–2010)
- The Diamonds (1953–)
- DIANA (2013–)
- Die Mannequin (2005–)
- Diemonds (2006–)
- Dig Circus (1998)
- Digawolf (2009–)
- Digging Roots (2004–)
- Digital Poodle (1986–1995)
- The Dik Van Dykes (1985–1989)
- Dilly Dally (2015–)
- The Dinner Is Ruined (1991–)
- Dinosaur Bones (2008–)
- The Diodes (1976–1982)
- Dionysos (1969–1974)
- Dirty Circus (2010–)
- The Dirty Nil (2006–)
- Dirty Radio (2010–)
- The Dirty Tricks (2003–2010)
- The Dishes (1975–1978)
- The Dishrags (1976–1980)
- Distoriam (2010–)
- Divinity (1997–)
- Dixie Flyers (1974–)
- Dizzy (2015–)
- Do Make Say Think (1995–)
- Doc Walker (1996–)
- Dr. Draw (2005–)
- Dr. Music (1969–1977)
- Dog Day (2004–)
- Doll (2007–)
- Don Vail (2006–)
- The Dope Poet Society (1995–)
- Double Experience (2014–)
- Doubting Thomas (1987–1994)
- Doug and the Slugs (1977–)
- Doughboys (1987–1997)
- Down with Webster (1998–2015)
- Downchild Blues Band (1969–)
- Downhere (1999–2012)
- Download (1994–)
- Dragon Fli Empire (2002–)
- Dragonette (2005–)
- The Dreadnoughts (2007–)
- Dream Warriors (1988–2002)
- DreamSTATE (1995–)
- Drentch (2000–)
- Droom (2002–2007)
- Dublin Corporation (1971–1973)
- Dubmatique (1992–)
- Duchess Says (2003–)
- Duck Sauce (2009–)
- Ducks Ltd.
- The Dudes (1996–)
- The Duhks (2002–)
- Dunk (1995–2000)
- Duo Caron (1990–)
- Duotang (1995–)
- Duplex! (2005–)
- Durham County Poets
- Dusted (2012–)
- DVAS (2003–)
- DVBBS (2012–)
- Dvsn (2015–)
- Dynamic Rockers (2004–)
- Dzeko & Torres (2007–2016)

== E ==
- Eagle & Hawk (1994–2010)
- Earle and Coffin (2016–)
- The East Pointers (2014–)
- Eaton Operatic Society (1919–1965)
- Eccodek (1999–)
- Econoline Crush (1992–)
- Edmonton Opera (1963–)
- Edmonton Symphony Orchestra (1952–)
- Edward Bear (1966–1973)
- Eidolon (1993–2007)
- Eight Seconds (1982–1990)
- Eklektikos (2002–)
- El Motor (2007–)
- Elbow Beach Surf Club (2006–2008)
- Eldebrock (2009–)
- Electric Magma (2001–)
- Electric Youth (2011–)
- Electro Quarterstaff (2001–)
- Elephant Stone (2008–)
- Elevator (1997–2005)
- Eleven Past One (2007–2017)
- Elliott Brood (2002–)
- Elmer Iseler Singers (1979–)
- The Elwins (2006–)
- Emerson Drive (1995–)
- Emily Haines & the Soft Skeleton (2006–)
- Empyria (1991–2021)
- En Bref (1992–2014)
- The End (1999–2007)
- The Enigmas (1982–1986)
- The Ennis Sisters (1997–)
- Ensemble Claude-Gervaise (1967–)
- Ensemble Made in Canada (2006–)
- Enter the Haggis (1995–)
- Epsilon Minus (2000–2005)
- Eric's Trip (1990–)
- Erimha (2010–)
- Ermine (2001–2008)
- E.S.L. (2006–)
- Esmerine (2003–)
- Esprit Orchestra (1983–)
- The Esquires (1962–1967)
- The Essentials (1993–2011)
- Et Cetera (1976–1977)
- Et Sans (2000–2006)
- L'Étranger (1980–1986)
- Eudoxis (1984–1993)
- Euphoria (1993–)
- Evans Blue (2005–)
- The Evaporators (1986–)
- Evening Hymns (2007–)
- Everyone's Talking (2008–)
- The Evidence (2002–2016)
- Ex Deo (2008–)
- Exciter (1978–)
- Exhaust (1996–)
- The Expos (2003–)
- Eye Eye (1983–1989)

== F ==
- Faber Drive (2004–)
- Fair Ground (2005–2008)
- Faith Healer (2015–)
- Fake Shark (2005–)
- Family Brown (1967–1990)
- The Famines (2008–2020)
- Fan Death (2007–2011)
- Fanna-Fi-Allah (1996–)
- Farewell to Freeway (2000–2016)
- Farm Fresh (1994–1996)
- Farmer's Daughter (1993–2002)
- The Farrell Bros. (2005–)
- Fast Forward (1984)
- Fast Romantics (2009–)
- Fat Man Waving (1987–1996)
- Fathead (1992–2016)
- Faunts (2000–)
- Fear Zero (2004–)
- Feeding Like Butterflies (1993–2001)
- Fembots (1998–2010)
- Fera (2000–2015)
- Festival Singers of Canada (1954–1979)
- Festival Winds (1988–2014)
- FET.NAT (2010–)
- Feuermusik (2004–2010)
- Field Day (1994–2004)
- Fifth Column (1981–2002)
- Fifths of Seven (1995–2005)
- Figgy Duff (1976–1995)
- Figure Four (1996–2006)
- Finest Kind (1996–)
- Finger Eleven (1990–)
- Finnr's Cane (2008–)
- First Words (2004–2008)
- First You Get the Sugar (2007–2015)
- Five Man Electrical Band (1963–1975)
- Five O'Clock Charlie (2001–2007)
- Five Star Affair (2004–)
- FKB (2009–)
- Flannel Jimmy (1998–2004)
- The Flashing Lights (1997–2001)
- Flashlight Brown (1996–)
- Flat Black (2023–)
- The Flatliners (2002–)
- Flight Distance (2004–)
- Florian Hoefner Trio (2019–)
- Floor Thirteen (1998–2012)
- The Flowers of Hell (2002–)
- Fludd (1971–1977)
- The Flummies (1978–)
- Fly Pan Am (1996–2005)
- Flybanger (1995–)
- Flying Bulgar Klezmer Band (1988–2010)
- The Flying Circus (1968–1975)
- Flying Down Thunder and Rise Ashen (2011)
- FM (1976–)
- FM Radio Gods (2006–)
- FM Static (2003–)
- Foggy Hogtown Boys (2001–)
- Folly and the Hunter (2008–2018)
- Fond of Tigers (2000–)
- A Foot in Coldwater (1970–1981)
- Forest City Lovers (2006–2012)
- Forgotten Rebels (1977–)
- Forgotten Tales (1999–)
- Fortunate Ones (2010–)
- Forty Foot Echo (2001–)
- Fosterchild (1976–1981)
- The Four Lads (1950–)
- Four the Moment (1981–2000)
- Four80East (1997–)
- The Framework (2006–2011)
- The Franklin Electric (2013–)
- Fraser & DeBolt (1969–1974)
- Fraser Union (1983–)
- Freaks of Reality (1994–1995)
- Free Beer (1979–1982)
- Freedom Writers
- Freeman Dre and the Kitchen Party (2010–)
- Fresh Snow (2010–)
- The Fretless (2011–)
- Friends of Fiddler's Green (1971–)
- FRIGS (2013–)
- Frog Eyes (2001–2018)
- Front Line Assembly (1986–)
- Frontperson (2018–)
- Frozen Ghost (1985–1993)
- Fuck the Facts (1997–)
- Fucked Up (2001–)
- Fujahtive (1986–)
- Full Tilt Boogie Band (1969–1970)
- The Fully Down (1999–2008)
- The Funk Hunters (2009–)
- Fur Trade (2013)
- Furnaceface (1989–1999)

== G ==
- Galaxie (2002–)
- The Gandharvas (1989–2000)
- Ganglion (2005–2011)
- Garfield (1974–)
- Garolou (1975–)
- Garry Lee and the Showdown (1980–1994)
- The Garrys (2015–)
- Gary and Dave (1969–1979)
- Gatineau (2004–)
- Gaze (1997–1999)
- Gazeebow Unit (2005–)
- Gazoline (2012–)
- Genetic Control (1982–)
- Genticorum (2000–)
- Les Georges Leningrad (1999–2007)
- Georgian Bay Symphony (1972–)
- Gerald Danovitch Saxophone Quartet (1968–1997)
- Germans (1999–2010, 2013)
- GFK (1996–2009)
- Ghetto Concept (1989–)
- The Ghost Is Dancing (2004–2010)
- Ghostkeeper (2008–)
- Ghosts of Modern Man (1994–)
- Gigi (2005–)
- Ginger (1992–1997)
- Girlsareshort (1998–)
- Glass Tiger (1983–)
- Glengarry Bhoys (1998–)
- Glissandro 70 (2004–)
- Glo (2001–)
- Gloin
- The Glorious Sons (2011–)
- Gloryhound (2006–)
- Glueleg (1990–1998)
- Goat Horn (1999–2006)
- Gob (1993–)
- God Made Me Funky (1996–)
- Goddo (1975–2018)
- Godspeed You! Black Emperor (1994–)
- Gogh Van Go (1993–2014)
- Gold & Youth (2011–)
- The Golden Dogs (2001–)
- The Golden Seals (1999–)
- The Good Brothers (1972–)
- Good for Grapes (2011–)
- Good Kid (2014–)
- The Good Lovelies (2006–)
- Goodnight, Sunrise (2011–)
- The Gorgeous (2003–2007)
- Gorguts (1989–)
- Governor General's Foot Guards Band (1872–)
- Grade (1994–)
- Graham Shaw and the Sincere Serenaders (1981–1985)
- Gramercy Riffs (2008–)
- Grand Analog (2006–)
- Grand Dérangement (1997–)
- Grand Philharmonic Choir (1883–)
- Grand Theft Bus (2000–)
- Grant Smith & The Power (1966–1970)
- The Grapes of Wrath (1983–)
- Da Grassroots (1989–)
- Greaseball Boogie Band (1972–1980)
- Great Big Sea (1993–2013)
- Great Bloomers (2000s–2013)
- Great Lake Swimmers (2003–)
- Great Speckled Bird (1969–1976)
- Great Uncles of the Revolution (2001–)
- Greater Victoria Police Pipe Band (1972–1998)
- Greek Buck (1998–)
- Green Go (2006–)
- Gregory Hoskins and the Stickpeople (1985–1996)
- Grievous Angels (1986–)
- Grim Tower (2010–)
- GrimSkunk (1988–)
- The Groove Kings (1993–)
- Groovy Aardvark (1986–)
- The Gruesomes (1985–)
- Gryphon Trio (1993–)
- Da Gryptions (2009–)
- Guerilla Welfare (1986–1995)
- The Guess Who (1965–)
- Gulfer (2011–)
- The Guthries (1998–2002)
- Gypsophilia (2004–)
- Gypsy Kumbia Orchestra (2015–)

== H ==
- Hail the Villain (2003–2012)
- Half Moon Run (2009–)
- Halifax Camerata Singers (1986–)
- The Halifax Three (1963–1964)
- The Halluci Nation (2007–)
- Hamilton Philharmonic Orchestra (1949–)
- Hamilton Police Pipe Band (1961–)
- Hammersmith (1975–1977)
- Handsome Furs (2006–2012)
- Hangedup (1999–2012)
- The Hanson Brothers (1984–2016)
- The Happy Pals (1968–)
- Hard Rock Miners (1987–)
- Hard Rubber Orchestra (1990–)
- Hardliner (1999–2004)
- The Hardship Post (1992–1997)
- Harem Scarem (1987–)
- Harlequin (1975–)
- Harm & Ease (2010–present)
- Harmonium (1972–1978)
- Harpoonist & The Axe Murderer (2006–)
- Hart House Symphonic Band (1995–)
- Hart-Rouge (1988–)
- The Haunted (1965–1971)
- Hawk Nelson (2000–)
- Hawking (2013–)
- Haywire (1982–)
- Head Hits Concrete (1999–)
- Head of the Herd (2010–)
- Headpins (1979–)
- Headscan (1986–)
- Headstones (1987–)
- Headstrong (1998–2003)
- Headwater (2001–2015)
- The Heartbroken (2009–)
- Heavy Blinkers (1998–2013)
- Heavy Hearts (2013–)
- Hedley (2003–2018)
- The Heebee-jeebees (1993–)
- Helix (1974–)
- Hello Beautiful (2007–)
- Hello, Blue Roses (2008–)
- Hemingway Corner (1992–2010)
- Henri Fabergé and the Adorables (2005–)
- The Henrys (1994–)
- The Hermit (2000–)
- Hexes & Ohs (2005–)
- Hey Major (2010–)
- Hey Ocean! (2004–)
- Hey Romeo (2002–)
- Hey Rosetta! (2005–2017)
- hHead (1991–1997)
- The Hidden Cameras (2001–)
- The Higgins (1998–)
- The High Bar Gang (2010–)
- The High Dials (2003–)
- High Five Drive (2001–)
- High Holy Days (1998–)
- High Valley (1997–)
- Hillsburn (2014–2024)
- Hilotrons (2003–2012)
- Hilt (1987–1996)
- Hinterland (2002–2008)
- Hip Club Groove (1991–1996)
- Hiss Tracts (2004–2014)
- Hissanol (1994–1998)
- Hokus Pick (1989–1999)
- Hollerado (2007–2019)
- Hollowick (2004–2013)
- Hollowphonic (1996–2019)
- Holly Cole Trio (1983–)
- The Holly Springs Disaster (2006–2010)
- Holy Fuck (2004–)
- Home Front (2021–present)
- Homeshake (2012–)
- The Hometown Band (1975–1979)
- Honeymoon Suite (1981–)
- Hooded Fang (2007–)
- The Hope Slide (2008–)
- Hopeful Monster (2000–)
- Hostage Life (2002–2009)
- Hot Hot Heat (1999–2016)
- Hot Little Rocket (1998–2009)
- Hot One (2005–)
- Hot Panda (2006–2017)
- Hot Springs (2004–2008)
- Hotel Mira (2010–)
- Hrsta (2001–)
- Huevos Rancheros (1990–2000)
- Hugh Dillon Redemption Choir (2004–)
- Human Highway (2008–)
- Humanifesto (2004–)
- Humans (2009–)
- The Hunt (1977–1984)
- Hunter Brothers (2016–)
- Hunter Valentine (2004–)
- The Hunters (2006 –2016)
- Huron (2008–)
- The Hylozoists (2001–2009)

== I ==
- I Hate Sally (2000–2008)
- I Mother Earth (1990–)
- I Musici de Montréal Chamber Orchestra (1984–)
- I Spy (1991–1996)
- Ian and Sylvia (1959–1975)
- Ice Cream (2014–)
- Idle Eyes (1983–)
- Idle Sons (1994–2007)
- Idlers (2006–2014)
- IllScarlett (2001–)
- Images in Vogue (1980–)
- Imaginary Cities (2010–2016)
- Immaculate Machine (2003–2011)
- In Essence (1993–2006)
- In-Flight Safety (2003–)
- In Medias Res (1999–)
- The Inbreds (1992–2012)
- INCURA (2003–)
- Indian City (2012–)
- Indian Handcrafts (2010–)
- Infernäl Mäjesty (1986–)
- Infidels (1990–1995)
- The Inflation Kills (2004–2015)
- Influence (1967–1969)
- Instruments (2001–)
- Inter-Mennonite Children's Choir (1967–)
- Intermix (1992–1995)
- International Symphony Orchestra (1957–)
- Interstellar (1998–2004)
- Intervals (2011–)
- Into Eternity (1997−)
- Ion Dissonance (2001–)
- The Irish Descendants (1990–)
- The Irish Rovers (1963–)
- Ironhorse (1979–1980)
- IRS (1999–2003)
- Islands (2005–)
- Isotopes Punk Rock Baseball Club (2007–)
- Iva and Angu (2022–)
- IVardensphere (2008–)
- Ivory Hours (2012–)

== J ==
- Jack London & The Sparrows (1964–1967)
- Jackson Delta (1989–)
- Jackson Hawke (1974–1978)
- Jackson Hollow
- Jacksoul (1995–2009)
- Jaffa Road (2005–)
- Jakalope (2003–2011)
- Jale (1992–1997)
- James Barker Band (2015–)
- Jane Vain and the Dark Matter (2005–)
- Japandroids (2006–)
- Jaymz Bee and the Royal Jelly Orchestra (1994–)
- Jazzberry Ram (1993–2003)
- Jeff Johnston Trio (1982–2005)
- Jellyfishbabies (1986–1993)
- The Jerry Cans (2012–)
- Jerry Jerry and the Sons of Rhythm Orchestra (1982–2005)
- Jersey (1996–2005)
- Jerusalem in My Heart (2005–)
- Jet Set Satellite (1998–)
- Jets Overhead (2003–)
- Jim and Don Haggart (1974–2006)
- Jimmy George (1991–)
- The Jimmy Swift Band (1999–2014)
- The Jitters (1981–1991)
- Jo Hikk (2004–)
- Jocelyn & Lisa (2011–)
- The Joel Plaskett Emergency (2001–)
- The Johner Brothers (1988–2001)
- Johnny and the Moon (2006–)
- Johnny Favourite Swing Orchestra (1996–2000)
- Johnny Hollow (2001–)
- The Johnstones (2002–)
- Jokers of the Scene (2003–)
- Jolly Tambourine Man (1983–1984)
- The Jolts (2004–)
- Jon and Lee & the Checkmates (1962–)
- Jon and Roy (2003–)
- Josh (2000–)
- Joydrop (1997–2004)
- Joyful Joyful (2016–)
- The Judes (2007–)
- Judy & David (1991–)
- July Talk (2012–)
- Jump Ship Quick (2005–)
- The Junction (2000–)
- Junior Blue (2001–2003)
- Junior Boys (1999–)
- Jr. Gone Wild (1982–)
- Junior Pantherz (1999–2007)
- Junkhouse (1989–)
- Just John x Dom Dias (2018–)

== K ==
- Kacy & Clayton (2011–)
- Kaïn (1999–)
- Kaliroots (1996–)
- Kanata Symphony (1981–)
- Kansas Stone (2013–)
- Karkwa (1998–2012)
- Kasador (2015–)
- Kashtin (1984–1996)
- Kataklysm (1991–)
- Kate & Anna McGarrigle (1975–2010)
- KC Accidental (1998–2000)
- Keister Family Fiddlers (2008–)
- KEN mode (1999–)
- Kendall Wall Band (1983–1993)
- Kensington Market (1967–1969)
- Kepler (1997–2006)
- Kermess (1995–2004)
- The Kerplunks (2007–)
- Kevin Hearn and Thin Buckle (2000–)
- Keys N Krates (2008–)
- Kick Axe (1976–)
- K.I.D (2014–)
- Kids on TV (2003–)
- Kidstreet (2007–)
- Kïll Cheerleadër (1999–2006)
- Kill Matilda (2007–)
- Kill No Albatross (2007–2019)
- Killer Bee (1990–)
- Killer Bunnies (1995–1998)
- Killer Dwarfs (1981–)
- Killitorous (2006–)
- The Killjoys (1992–)
- The Kindred (2006–)
- Kinetic Ideals (1980–2014)
- King Apparatus (1987–)
- King Cobb Steelie (1991–)
- The King Khan & BBQ Show (2002–)
- King Khan and the Shrines (1999–)
- The King's Own Calgary Regiment Band (1910–)
- The Kingpins (1994–2004)
- The Kings (1977–)
- Kingston Symphony (1953–)
- Kingston Symphony Orchestra (1914–)
- Kitchener–Waterloo Symphony (1945–)
- Kitchens & Bathrooms (1998–2003)
- Kittens (1992–1999)
- Kittie (1996–)
- Kiwi Jr.
- Klaatu (1973–)
- Kleztory (2000–)
- Knacker (1998–2005)
- Knucklehead (1994–2013)
- Kobo Town (2004–)
- Kobra and the Lotus (2008–)
- Kon Kan (1988–)
- Konflit (1998–)
- The Kry (1992–)
- Kubasonics (1996–)

== L ==
- Lace (1998–)
- Ladyhawk (2004–)
- LAL (2009–)
- Land of Talk (2006–)
- The Laundronauts (2007–)
- Lava Hay (1989–1994)
- Leahy (1980s–)
- Lee Harvey Osmond (2009–)
- Left Spine Down (2003–)
- Leigh Ashford (1966–1974)
- The Lemon Bucket Orkestra (2010–)
- Len (1991–)
- Les BB (1980–1995)
- Lesbians on Ecstasy (2003–)
- Leslie Spit Treeo (1988–2000)
- L'Étranger (1980–1986)
- Library Voices (2008 –)
- Life (1969–1970)
- Liferuiner (2004–)
- Lighthouse (1968–)
- Lightning Dust (2007–)
- Lili Fatale (1994–2001)
- Lillix (1997–2010)
- Limblifter (1996–)
- Lime (1980–)
- The Lincolns (1979–2016)
- the lion the bear the fox (2012–)
- Lioness (2007–)
- Little Caesar and the Consuls (1956–1971)
- Little Girls (2008 –)
- Live on Arrival (2007–)
- LiveonRelease (2000–2003)
- LMDS (1993–2001)
- Local Rabbits (1990–2001)
- Loco Locass (1995–)
- Lola Dutronic (2004–)
- Longing for Dawn (2002–2011)
- Longue Distance (groupe) (1998 -)
- The Look People (1985–1993)
- The Lorne Scots (Peel, Dufferin and Halton Regiment) Regimental Pipes & Drums (1881–)
- Lost & Profound (1985–2015)
- Lost Dakotas (1989–1996)
- The Lost Fingers (2008 –)
- Lotus Child (2003–2009)
- Loud Luxury (2012–)
- Love and Sas (1991–1993)
- Love Inc. (1997–2003)
- Love Kills (2005–2009)
- The Lovely Feathers (2005–)
- Loverboy (1979–)
- Low Level Flight (2006–)
- The Lowest of the Low (1991–)
- Luke & The Apostles (1964–1967)
- Luther Wright and the Wrongs (1998–)
- The Luyas (2006–)
- The Lynnes (2011–)

== M ==
- Machete Avenue (2005–)
- MacLean & MacLean (1972–1998)
- The Maddigans (2008–)
- Madison Violet (1999–)
- Madrid (2003–)
- Magic! (2012–)
- Magneta Lane (2003–)
- Maharahj (1997–2002)
- Mahjor Bidet (2006–2007)
- Mahogany Rush (1969–2021)
- The Mahones (1990–)
- Main Source (1989–1994)
- Majical Cloudz (2010–2016)
- Majid Jordan (2011–)
- Major Hoople's Boarding House (1967–)
- Major Maker (2006–)
- Malajube (2004–2012)
- Malhavoc (1983–)
- Mama's Broke (2017–present)
- Mandala (1965–1970)
- Mandroid Echostar (2010–)
- Manic Drive (2005–)
- Manila Grey (2016–)
- Mannequin Depressives (1998–)
- Manteca (1979–)
- The Manvils (2005–)
- Maow (1994–1997)
- The Marble Index (2001–)
- Mare (2004–)
- Mares of Thrace (2010–)
- Marianas Trench (2001–)
- Marilyn's Vitamins (1995–2000)
- The Mark Inside (2000–)
- Martha and the Muffins (1977–)
- Martyr (1994–2012)
- Mashmakhan (1969–1971)
- Masochistic Religion (1988–1998)
- Matt Mays & El Torpedo (2002–2013)
- Matters (2005–2011)
- Matthew Good Band (1995–2002)
- Max Webster (1972–1996)
- The Maximum Definitive (1990–1993)
- The McAuley Boys (1995 –)
- The McDades (2000–)
- MCJ & Cool G (1986–1997)
- McKenna Mendelson Mainline (1968–1975)
- McMaster & James (1999–2003)
- Me Mom and Morgentaler (1990–1996)
- Mean Red Spiders (1993–)
- Means (2000–2008)
- Mecca Normal (1984–)
- The Meligrove Band (1997–)
- Mélisande (électrotrad) (2007–)
- The Memories Attack (2006–)
- Memoryhouse (2010–)
- Memphis (2002–)
- Men I Trust (2014–)
- The Men of the Deeps (1966–)
- Men Without Hats (1977–)
- Mercey Brothers (1957–1989)
- The Mercy Now (2006–)
- Mercy, the Sexton (2007–)
- Merryweather (1968–1973)
- Mes Aïeux (1996–)
- Messenjah (1990–)
- Metalwood (1997–)
- Metric (1998–)
- METZ (2008–)
- The Mid-Knights (1959–1970)
- Midnight Shine (2011–)
- The Midway State (2007–)
- Milk & Bone (2013–)
- The Minglewood Band (1969–1986)
- Mir (1996–)
- Miracle Fortress (2005–)
- Miriodor (1980–)
- Mobile (2005–2011)
- The Mods (1978–1980)
- Moev (1981–)
- The Moffatts (1987–)
- The Mohawk Lodge (2003–)
- Moist (1992–)
- Moneen (2000–)
- MonkeyJunk (2008–)
- Monowhales
- Monster Truck (2009–)
- Monster Voodoo Machine (1991–)
- Mood Ruff (1994–2005)
- Moscow Apartment (2017–)
- The Most Serene Republic (2003–)
- The Motes (1994–)
- Mother Mother (2005–)
- Motherlode (1969–1990)
- Mountain City Four (1963–1967)
- The Mountains and the Trees (2006–)
- Mounties (2013–)
- Moxy (1974–)
- Moxy Früvous (1989–2001)
- Mr. Something Something (2003–2009)
- The MRQ (1968–1970)
- MSTRKRFT (2005–)
- Mudmen (1998–)
- The Musical Box (1993–)
- La Musique du Royal 22e Régiment (1922–)
- My Darkest Days (2005–2013)
- Myles and Lenny (1969–1976)
- The Mynah Birds (1964–1967)
- Mystery (1986–)
- Mystery Machine (1990–2012)
- Mythos (1995–2018)

== N ==
- Naden Band of Maritime Forces Pacific (1940–)
- Nadja (2003–)
- Nap Eyes (2007–) (2007–)
- Nathan (2001–)
- Nathaniel Dett Chorale (1998–)
- National Academy Orchestra of Canada (1989–)
- National Arts Centre Orchestra (1969–)
- National Broadcast Orchestra of Canada (2009–)
- The National Parcs (2007–)
- National Velvet (1985–)
- National Youth Orchestra of Canada (1960–)
- Natural Gas (1960s–1970s)
- Naturally Born Strangers (2013–)
- Nefastus Dies (2005−)
- nêhiyawak (2019–)
- The Neilsons (1996–)
- Neon Dreams (2015–)
- A Neon Rome (1984–1987)
- Neufeld-Occhipinti Jazz Orchestra (1994–)
- Neuraxis (1994–)
- Neurosonic (2006–2009)
- Neverest (2007–2014)
- New Brunswick Youth Orchestra (1965–)
- The New Cities (2005–2013)
- New City (2017–)
- New Country Rehab (2010–)
- The New Deal (1998–)
- The New Grand (1995–2000)
- New Look (2007–2011)
- New Meanies (1990–)
- The New Mendicants (2012–)
- New Orford String Quartet (2009–)
- The New Pornographers (1997–)
- New Regime (1982–1987)
- New Swears (2012–)
- New Town Animals (1998–2002)
- New West
- Newfoundland Symphony Orchestra (1962–)
- Newmarket Citizens' Band (1872–)
- Newworldson (2006–)
- Nick Buzz (1995–)
- Nick Danger and the Danger City Rebels (2000–2007)
- Nickelback (1995–)
- Nightbox (2009–2014)
- Nihilist Spasm Band (1965–)
- Nikki Awesome & The Royal Society (2008–2010)
- The Nils (1978–)
- Nine Mile (2001–)
- The Nines (1992–)
- Ninja High School (2004–2007)
- No Joy (2009–)
- No Kids (2008–)
- No Sinner (2012–)
- No Warning (1998–)
- Noise Unit (1989–)
- Nomadic Massive (2004–)
- Nomeansno (1979–2016)
- Norteño (1993–)
- North of America (1997–2003)
- A Northern Chorus (1999–2008) (1999–2008)
- Northern Cree (1980–)
- Northern Haze (1984–)
- The Northern Pikes (1984–)
- The Northwest Company (1966–1973)
- Not by Choice (1997–)
- Nouvel Ensemble Moderne (1989–)
- Nova Scotia Mass Choir (1992–)
- Novillero (1999–2010)
- NQ Arbuckle (2002–)
- Nü Sensae (2008–2014)
- Nuance (1975–1988)
- Nudimension (1982–1989)
- Numb (1986–)
- Numéro# (2005–2011)
- The Nylons (1978–)

== O ==
- Oakville Children's Choir (1994–)
- Oakville Ensemble (2005–)
- Oakville Symphony Orchestra (1967–)
- The OBGMs (2007–)
- Obliveon (1987–)
- Obscene Eulogy (1999–)
- Ocie Elliott (2017–present)
- Ocean (1970–1975)
- October Sky (2000–)
- The October Trio (2004–)
- Octoberman (2005–)
- Octobre (1971–1982)
- The Oddities (1998–)
- Odds (1987–)
- Odonis Odonis (2009–)
- Of Atlantis (2012–)
- Offenbach (1969–)
- Oh No Forest Fires (2007–2010)
- Ohbijou (2004–2013)
- OK Cobra (2005–)
- Okavango African Orchestra (2010–)
- Okoumé (1995–2002)
- Oktoécho (2009–)
- Ol' Savannah (2009–)
- The Old Soul (2003–2008)
- Old World Vulture (2008–)
- Olenka and the Autumn Lovers (2008–)
- Oliver Black (2002–)
- The Olympic Symphonium (2005–)
- OMBIIGIZI (2021–)
- Omnikrom (2007–2009)
- The Once (2004–)
- One Bad Son (2004–)
- One Free Fall (1994–)
- One Horse Blue (1975–1995)
- One Hundred Dollars (2006–)
- One More Girl (2008–)
- One Shot Left (1997–)
- One to One (1984–1992)
- One Ton (1997–2002)
- Oni (2014–)
- The Oot n' Oots
- Opera Atelier (1985–)
- Opéra de Montréal (1980–)
- Opera Lyra Ottawa (1984–2015)
- The Operation M.D. (2006–)
- Oplenac (1987–)
- The Orchard (2012–)
- Orchestra London Canada (1937–2015)
- Orchestre de la Francophonie (2001–)
- Orchestre Métropolitain (1980–)
- Orchestre Symphonique de Québec (1902–)
- Orchid Ensemble (1997–)
- The Orchid Highway (1994–)
- Orford String Quartet (1965–1991)
- The Organ (2001–2006)
- Organ Thieves (2008–2013)
- Organized Rhyme (1990–1993)
- The Original Caste (1966–)
- Ottawa Police Service Pipe Band (1969–)
- Ottawa Symphony Orchestra (1944–)
- Ottawa Youth Orchestra Academy (1960–)
- Ouanani (2004–)
- Ought (2011–2021)
- Our Lady Peace (1992–)
- Ours to Destroy (2004–)
- Out of Your Mouth (1997–2004)
- Outlaws of Ravenhurst (2005–)
- Ox (2003–)

== P ==
- P:ano (1999–2008)
- The Pack A.D. (2006–)
- Pain For Pleasure (1996–)
- Painted Thin (1994–1999)
- Palaye Royale (2008–)
- Pantychrist (2003–)
- The Paper Cranes (2005–)
- Paper Lions (2004–)
- Paper Moon (2000–)
- The Paperbacks (2000–)
- The Paperboys (1991–)
- The Pappy Johns Band (1978–)
- Parabelle (2008–)
- The Parachute Club (1982–2014)
- Paradox (1984–1991)
- Parallels (2008–)
- The Parkdale Revolutionary Orchestra (2005–)
- Parker Trio (1995–2006)
- Parlovr (2007–2013)
- The Partland Brothers (1979–)
- Partner (2014–)
- A Passing Fancy (1966–1969)
- La Patère Rose (2003–2011)
- The Paupers (1965–1968)
- Payolas (1978–2008)
- Peach Pit (2016–)
- A Perfect Murder (2000–)
- The Perpetrators (1999–)
- Perth County Conspiracy (1969–1977)
- The Pets (1999–2000)
- The Pettit Project (1999–2015)
- Pharis and Jason Romero (2007–)
- The Philosopher Kings (1993–)
- The Phonemes (2003–2009)
- Phono-Comb (1993–1999)
- Picastro (1998–)
- The Pied Pumkin (1973–1976)
- Pigeon Hole (2000–)
- Piledriver (1984–)
- Pilot Speed (1999–2010)
- Pink Mountaintops (2003–)
- Plaid Tongued Devils (1990–)
- Planet Giza
- The Planet Smashers (1993–)
- Plants and Animals (2003–)
- The Plastic Cloud (1967–1968)
- Platinum Blonde (1980–)
- Plumtree (1993–2000)
- Pluto (1993–1999)
- Po' Girl (2000–)
- Pocket Dwellers (1996–)
- Point of Grace (1991–)
- Pointed Sticks (1978–)
- Poledo (1994–1998)
- The Poles (1976–1980)
- Pony
- Pony Da Look (2001–2011)
- Pony Girl (2012–)
- Pony Up (2002–)
- The Poppy Family (1968–1972)
- Population II
- Porkbelly Futures (2005–)
- Port Cities (2015–)
- Postdata (2009–)
- The Poverty Plainsmen (1987–)
- The Powder Blues Band (1978–)
- Prairie Oyster (1974–2014)
- Precious Fathers (2004–)
- Pretty Boy Floyd (1987–1990)
- The Priddle Concern (2008–)
- Pride Tiger (2005–2009)
- Priestess (2002–2012)
- A Primitive Evolution (2007–)
- Prism (1976–)
- Project Wyze (1988–2003)
- Projet Orange (2000–2007)
- Propagandhi (1986–)
- Protest the Hero (2001–)
- The Provincial Archive (2009–)
- Prozzäk (1998–2019)
- Psyche (1982–)
- Pugs and Crows (2008–)
- Pukka Orchestra (1979–1988)
- Pulse Ultra (1997–2004)
- Punjabi by Nature (1993–2000)
- PUP (2010–)
- Pure (1991–2000)
- Purity Ring (2010–)
- The Pursuit of Happiness (1985–)
- Put the Rifle Down (2004–)

== Q ==
- Qristina & Quinn Bachand (2007–)
- Quantum Tangle (2014–)
- Quartette (1993–)
- Quartetto Gelato (1994–)
- Quatuor Bozzini (1999–)
- Queen City Kids (1968–1983)
- Queer Songbook Orchestra (2014–)
- Quest for Fire (2007–2013)
- Quickflight (1980–1984)
- The Quid (1964–1970)
- The Quiet Jungle (1965–1968)
- Quintessential Vocal Ensemble (1993–)
- Quinzy (2003–2012)
- Quo Vadis (1992–2011)

== R ==
- The Rabid Whole (2007–)
- The Racoons (2008–)
- Radio Radio (2007–)
- The Raes (1976–1980)
- The Raftsmen (1960–1970)
- Raggadeath (1995–1997)
- Raggedy Angry (2006–)
- Rah Rah (2006–2019)
- Rainbow Butt Monkeys (1990–1996)
- Raised by Swans (1998–)
- Raising the Fawn (1997–)
- Raleigh (2010–)
- Random Killing (1984–)
- Random Recipe (2007–)
- The Rankin Family (1989–)
- Rare Air (1978–1991)
- Rare Americans (2018–present)
- Rarity (2014–)
- Rascalz (1989–)
- Ratchet Orchestra (1992–)
- Rational Youth (1981–)
- Rattled Roosters (1993–2001)
- Rattlesnake Choir
- Ravin' (1970–1980)
- Rawlins Cross (1988–)
- Ray Condo and His Hardrock Goners (1985–1995)
- Razor (1983–)
- The Razorbacks (1986–1996)
- Re: (1998–)
- The Real McKenzies (1992–)
- The Reason (2003–)
- Recovery Child (2006–)
- Red Deer Royals (1969–)
- Red Deer Symphony (1987–)
- Red Rider (1975–)
- Redeye Empire (2006–2020)
- Regimental Pipes and Drums of The Calgary Highlanders (1923–)
- Regina Symphony Orchestra (1908–)
- The Reklaws (2012–)
- Rembetika Hipsters (1996–)
- Removal (1997–)
- Republic of Safety (2005–2008)
- Reset (1993–)
- The Respectables (1991–)
- Reuben and the Dark (2012–)
- Le Rêve du Diable (1974–)
- Revenge (2000–)
- The Reverb Syndicate (2006–)
- Reverend Ken and the Lost Followers (1978–1988)
- Reverie Sound Revue (2002–)
- The Revols (1957–1962)
- Rheostatics (1978–)
- Rhinoceros (1967–1970)
- Rhythm Activism (1986–1998)
- Rhythm & News (1988–1998)
- Richard Eaton Singers (1951–)
- Richmond Delta Youth Orchestra (1971–)
- Rime Organisé (2000–)
- Ripcordz (1980–)
- River Town Saints (2013–)
- Riverbeds (2010–)
- The Road Hammers (2005 –)
- Robbie Lane and the Disciples (1963–)
- Robin Black and the Intergalactic Rock Stars (1998–2003)
- Robyn and Ryleigh (2012–)
- The Rock n Roll Rats (2009–2014)
- Rock Plaza Central (1996–)
- Rockets Red Glare (1999–2003)
- Rockhead (1991–1993)
- Roman Grey (1982–1990)
- The Romaniacs (1984–1995)
- Romes (2015–)
- Ron Hawkins and the Rusty Nails (1995–1999)
- Rose Chronicles (1993–1996)
- Rough Trade (1968–1988)
- Royal Canadian Air Force Band (1947–)
- Royal Canadian Artillery Band (1899–)
- Royal Canoe (2010–)
- Royal City (1999–2004)
- Royal Military College of Canada Bands (1953–)
- The Royal Royal (2011–)
- Rubber (1987–)
- Rum Ragged (2014–)
- The Rural Alberta Advantage (2005–)
- Rush (1968–2018)
- The Russian Futurists (2000–)
- Rusty (1994–)
- Rx (1998)
- Ryan's Fancy (1971–1983)
- RyanDan (2006–)
- Rymes with Orange (1992–2017)

== S ==
- Sackville (1994–2001)
- Sacrifice (1983–)
- The Saddletramps (1988–1995)
- The Sadies (1994–)
- Saga (1977–)
- Sagapool (1999–)
- Said the Whale (2007–)
- Saint Alvia (2005–2013)
- Saint Asonia (2015–)
- The Sainte Catherines (1999–2012)
- Saints & Sinners (1991–1993)
- The Salads (1993–2016)
- Salmonblaster (1994–1998)
- The Salteens (1997–2012)
- Sam Roberts Band (2000–)
- Samantha Martin & Delta Sugar (2015–)
- Samba Squad (1999–)
- Same Same (2006)
- Sandalspring (1968–1970)
- Sandbox (1993–1998)
- Sargeant X Comrade (2012–)
- Sattalites (1981–)
- The Scene (1967–1968)
- The Scenics (1976–)
- Scratching Post (1992–2000)
- Scrubbaloe Caine (1970–1976)
- Seaway (2011–)
- Sea Snakes (2002–2005)
- Secret and Whisper (2007–2011)
- The Secret Beach (2022–present)
- The Secrets (1978–1981)
- Sector Seven (1992–2011)
- See Spot Run (1997–)
- Serial Joe (1997–2002)
- The Sessions (2004–2008)
- Set Fire to Flames (2000–2003)
- Sexual Assault (2008–2011)
- Shades of Culture (1992–2003)
- Shadowy Men on a Shadowy Planet (1984–)
- Shalabi Effect (1996–)
- Shallow North Dakota (1993–2019)
- Shapes and Sizes (2006–2011)
- Sharon, Lois & Bram (1978–2015)
- Shaye (2003–2009)
- Sheavy (1993–)
- The Sheepdogs (2004–)
- Sheriff (1979–1985)
- Shooter (1972–1980)
- Shotgun & Jaybird (2003–2007)
- Shotmaker (1993–1996)
- Shout Out Out Out Out (2004–)
- Shreddy Krueger (2011–)
- Showbusiness Giants (1987–2001)
- The Shuffle Demons (1984–)
- Shy Kids (2012–)
- Shyne Factory (1992–2004)
- Sianspheric (1994–)
- Silla + Rise (2016–)
- A Silver Mt. Zion (1999–2014)
- Silver Starling (2008–2015)
- Silverstein (2000–)
- Simani (1977–1997)
- Simon Caine (1967–1971)
- Simon Fraser University Pipe Band (1966–)
- Simple Plan (1999–)
- Simply Majestic (1990–1992)
- Simply Saucer (1973–)
- Siskiyou (2010–)
- Skinny Puppy (1982–)
- The Skitzos (2004–2008)
- Skull Fist (2006–)
- The Skulls (1977–1982)
- Sky (1997–2005)
- Skydiggers (1987–)
- Skylark (1971–1973)
- The Slakadeliqs (2011–)
- Slash Need (2018–)
- Slash Puppet (1989–1995)
- Slaughter (1984–2008)
- Slaveco. (2002–2004)
- The Slew (2004–2009)
- Slik Toxik (1988–1994)
- Sloan (1991–) (2011–)
- The Slocan Ramblers
- Sloche (1971–1976)
- Slow (1984–)
- Slowburn (1992–1999)
- Slowcoaster (1999–)
- Small Sins (2000–)
- The Smalls (1989–2001)
- Smalltown DJs (1999–present)
- Smoother (1992–2002)
- The Smugglers (1988–2019)
- SNFU (1981–2018)
- Snotty Nose Rez Kids (2016–)
- Snowblink (1988–)
- So Loki (2015–)
- Social Code (1999–2012)
- Social Deviantz (1992–)
- The Social Icons (2009–)
- Les Soeurs Boulay (2013–)
- Softcult (2020–present)
- Sol (1996–1999)
- Solids
- Son (1995–1998)
- Sons of Butcher (2004–)
- Sons of Freedom (1986–1994)
- Sons of Maxwell (1989–2010)
- Sons of Otis (1992–)
- Sonshine and Broccoli (2004–)
- The Sorority (2016–2019)
- Soul Attorneys (1994–present)
- SoulDecision (1993–2005)
- The Souljazz Orchestra (2002–)
- The Sound Bluntz (2002–2007)
- The Sparrows (1964–1967)
- A Spectre Is Haunting Europe (2002–2009)
- Spice (1967–1973)
- Spiral Beach (2003–2009)
- Spiritbox (2016–)
- Spirit of the West (1983–2016)
- Splitting Adam (1996–2010)
- Spring Breakup (2009–)
- Spoons (1979–)
- Sproll (2003–)
- The Spurs (1999–2000)
- The Squires (1963–1965)
- SS Cardiacs (2004–2005)
- Stabilo (1999–2011)
- Stadacona Band of Maritime Forces Atlantic (1942–)
- Staggered Crossing (1997–2020)
- The Stampeders (1964–)
- The Standstills (2010–)
- The Stanfields (2008–)
- Starfield (2000–)
- Starkicker (1995–2005)
- Stars (2000–)
- State of Shock (1999–)
- Static in Stereo (1999–2003)
- Status/Non-Status (2009–)
- Steel River (1969–1974)
- The Stellas (2009–)
- Steppenwolf (1967–2018)
- Stereos (2008–)
- Stiff Valentine (2006–)
- The Stills (2000–2011)
- St. Michael's Choir School (1937–)
- The Stolen Minks (2003–)
- Stonebolt (1969–)
- Straight Lines (1975–1982)
- Strange Advance (1982–)
- Strapping Young Lad (1994–2007)
- Streetheart (1977–)
- Streetnix (1991–2002)
- Striker (2007–)
- Stringband (1971–1986)
- Stripper's Union (2004–)
- The Strumbellas (2008–)
- Stuck On Planet Earth (2007–)
- Stutterfly (1998–2007)
- Subb (1992–2010)
- Subhumans (1978–2010)
- Sugar Jones (2000–2002)
- The Sugar Shoppe (1967–1970)
- Sugluk (1966–1985)
- The Suits XL (1995–)
- Sully (1994–2002)
- Sum 41 (1996–)
- The Summerlad (1999–)
- Sumo Cyco (2011–)
- Sunparlour Players (2006–)
- Sunset Rubdown (2004–2009)
- Super Duty Tough Work (2018–)
- The Super Friendz (1994–2004)
- Superconductor (1990–1996)
- Supergarage (1995–2007)
- Suuns (2007–)
- Sven Gali (1987–)
- Swallowing Shit (1994–1997)
- Swamp Baby (1989–1995)
- Swan Lake (2006–2009)
- Sweatshop Union (2000–)
- Sweeney Todd (1975–)
- Sweet Thing (2005–2011)
- Swing (1999–)
- The Swinging Belles (2014–)
- Switchblade Valentines (2004–)
- Swollen Members (1990–)
- Sword (1981–)
- Sylvie (1999–)
- Sympathy (1991–)
- Synæsthesia (1995–2001)

== T ==
- Tadros (2000–)
- Tafelmusik Baroque Orchestra (1979–)
- Tamarack (1978–)
- Tangiers (2003–2006)
- Tanglefoot (1979–2009)
- Tapestry (1971–1973)
- Tapestry Opera (1979–)
- Tasseomancy (2008–)
- TBTBT (1990–1995)
- Tchukon (1978–1990)
- The Birthday Massacre (1999–)
- The Tea Party (1990–)
- Team Rezofficial (2003–2010)
- The Tear Garden (1986–)
- Tearjerker (2006–)
- Teaze (1975–)
- Teenage Head (1975–)
- Teenage Kicks (2010–)
- Tegan and Sara (1995–)
- TEKE::TEKE (2016–)
- Temperance (1990–2000)
- Templar (1998–2001)
- Ten Second Epic (2002–2014)
- Ten Strings and a Goat Skin (2010–2018)
- Ten Ways (2001–2010)
- Tenet (1996–)
- The Tenors (2004–)
- Terror Syndrome (2006–2018)
- Tetrix (2001–)
- Thantifaxath (2010–)
- Theatre of Early Music (2001–)
- Thee Silver Mt. Zion Memorial Orchestra (1999–2014)
- Then One Day (1983–1987)
- Theory of a Deadman (1999–)
- These Kids Wear Crowns (2009–)
- They Shoot Horses, Don't They? (2003–2008)
- Thine Eyes Bleed (2002–)
- Think About Life (2005–2012)
- Thirteen Strings (1976–)
- Thomas Trio and the Red Albino (1988–1993)
- The Thomists (1965–)
- Thor (1971–)
- Thornley (2002–2011)
- Thousand Foot Krutch (1995–)
- THP Orchestra (1976–1980)
- Threat Signal (2003–)
- Three Days Grace (1997–)
- Three Dead Trolls in a Baggie (1987–2005)
- Three O'Clock Train (1984–)
- Thrush Hermit (1992–2019)
- Thunder Bay Symphony Orchestra (1960–)
- Thunderheist (2005–2010)
- Thundermug (1970–2001)
- Thus Owls (2007–)
- Timber Timbre (2005–)
- Tin Foil Phoenix (1997–)
- Tin Star Orphans (2004–)
- Tinker (1993–1994)
- Tipatchimun (2003–)
- TMDP (2009–)
- TODAY (2013–)
- Today I Caught the Plague (2006–)
- Tokyo Police Club (2005–)
- Tom Fun Orchestra (2005–)
- Tommy Lefroy (2018–)
- Tone Mason (2002–)
- Tons of Fun University (2003–)
- TOPS (2011–)
- Torngat (2001–)
- Toronto (1979–)
- Toronto Chamber Orchestra (1976–)
- Toronto Children's Chorus (1978–)
- Toronto Choral Society (1845–)
- Toronto Jewish Folk Choir (1925–)
- Toronto Light Opera Association (1940–1955)
- Toronto Mass Choir (1988–)
- Toronto Mendelssohn Choir (1894–)
- Toronto Northern Lights (1998–)
- Toronto Philharmonic Orchestra (1989–)
- Toronto Police Pipe Band (1912–)
- Toronto String Quartette (1884–1926)
- Toronto Symphony Orchestra (1922–)
- Toronto Symphony Orchestra (Welsman) (1906–1918)
- Toronto Symphony Youth Orchestra (1974–)
- Toronto Tabla Ensemble (1991–)
- Touch and Nato (2005–)
- The Tower of Dudes (2007–)
- Townline (2002–)
- TR/ST (2010–)
- Tracteur Jack (2003–)
- The Tragically Hip (1984–2017)
- Trans-Canada Highwaymen (2016–present)
- Trans-X (1981–)
- Transistor Sound & Lighting Co. (1996–2000)
- The Travellers (1953–1985)
- Treble Charger (1992–)
- Trent Severn (2011–2019)
- The Trews (1997–)
- Tricky Woo (1996–2005)
- Tribal Machine (1999–)
- Tri-Continental (1988–)
- Tricot Machine (2005–2012)
- Trio lyrique (1932–1965)
- The Tripp (1966–1977)
- Tristan Psionic (1991–2010)
- Triumph (1975–1993)
- Triumph Street Pipe Band (1971–)
- Les Trois Accords (1997–)
- Trooper (1975–)
- TRP.P (2017–)
- Tru-Paz (2001–2013)
- Truck (1966–1974)
- True Myth (1977–1981)
- Tú (1984–1990)
- Tudjaat (1994–1997)
- Tuns (2015–)
- Tupelo Honey (2003–2015)
- Tupper Ware Remix Party (2007–)
- Turn Off the Stars (2004–2009)
- Tvangeste (1996–)
- Twin Flames (2015–)
- The Twisters (1994–2014)
- Two Crown King (2009–2014)
- Two Hours Traffic (2000–2013)
- The Two-Minute Miracles (1995–)
- Tyrants Blood (2005–)

== U ==
- UHF (1989–1998)
- UJ3RK5 (1978–1981)
- Ubiquitous Synergy Seeker (2004–2021)
- The Ugly Ducklings (1965–)
- Uisce Beatha (1988–1999)
- Ukrainian Dnipro Ensemble of Edmonton (1953–)
- Ukrainian Male Chorus of Edmonton (1984–)
- Uncle Moishy and the Mitzvah Men (1979–)
- Uncut (2001–)
- The Undecided (1994–2001)
- Unexpect (1996–2015)
- The Unicorns (2000–2004)
- The Unintended (2004–)
- Unit 187 (1994–2015)
- United Steel Workers of Montreal (2004–2011)
- Universal Honey (1992–)
- Unleash the Archers (2007–)
- Unravelled Broken Orchestra (2004–2009)
- Urban Tapestry (1993–)
- Urgent (1982–1984)
- Uzeb (1976–)

== V ==
- Vacuity (2004–2013)
- Vaghy String Quartet (1965–)
- Vagina Witchcraft (2018–)
- Valaire (2005–)
- The Valentino Orchestra (1996–2002)
- Valley (2014–)
- Valley of the Giants (2002–2004)
- Vampire Beach Babes (1997–)
- Vampire Rodents (1989–1996)
- Van Allen Belt (1994–1998)
- Vancouver Cantata Singers (1959–)
- Vancouver Chamber Choir (1971–)
- Vancouver Chinese Music Ensemble (1989–)
- Vancouver Men's Chorus (1981–)
- Vancouver Metropolitan Orchestra (2003–)
- Vancouver Opera (1958–)
- Vancouver Police Pipe Band (1914–)
- Vancouver Recital Society (1980–)
- Vancouver Symphony Orchestra (1919–)
- Vancouver Woodwind Quintet (1968–1978)
- Vancouver Youth Symphony Orchestra (1930–)
- Varga (1989–)
- Veal (1994–2004)
- The Veer Union (2004–)
- The Vees (1992–1997)
- Velvet Empire (2002–2003)
- The Velveteins (2014–)
- Le Vent du Nord (2002–)
- The Vermicious Knid (2000–2006)
- Vertical After (1989–2003)
- Vesuvius (2012–)
- Viathyn (2006–)
- Vice Verset (1997–2006)
- Victoria Philharmonic Choir (2005–)
- Victoria Police Pipe Band (1936–)
- Victoria Symphony (1941–)
- Videotape (2007–)
- Vilain Pingouin (1986–)
- Vile Creature (2014–)
- The Viletones (1977–)
- Villain Accelerate (2003–)
- Ville Émard Blues Band (1973–1975)
- Vincat (2004–2009)
- The Vincent Black Shadow (2003–)
- The Violet Archers (2005–)
- Vishtèn (2003–)
- Visible Wind (1983–)
- Vision Eternel (2007–)
- Vital Sines (1981–1988)
- vitaminsforyou (1998–)
- Voggue (1979–1984)
- Voices in Public (1996–2004)
- Voivod (1982–)
- La Volée d'Castors (1993–)
- Völur (2014–)
- Vromb (1992–)
- Vulgaires Machins (1995–)

== W ==
- The Wailin' Jennys (2002–)
- The Wainwright Sisters (2015–)
- Waiting for God (1994–1997)
- Wake Owl (2012–)
- The Waking Eyes (2002–2010)
- The Walk (1987–1996)
- Walk off the Earth (2006–)
- Walter TV (2012–)
- Waltons (1987–2005)
- War Party (1995–2004)
- Warpig (1968–)
- Warriors (1982–1986)
- Warsawpack (1999–2004)
- The Washboard Union (2010–)
- The Watchmen (1988–)
- Water on Mars (2004–2009)
- Waterbodies (2008–2015)
- Wave (1999–2003)
- Way to Go, Einstein (2006–2010)
- Wayne McGhie and the Sounds of Joy (1970)
- We Are the City (2008–2020)
- We Are Wolves (2000–)
- We Love Danger! (2009–)
- The Weakerthans (1997–2014)
- Weapon (2003–2013)
- The Weather Station (2006–)
- Weaves (2012–)
- Wednesday (1971–1981)
- Wednesday Night Heroes (1997–2009)
- The Weekend (1998–)
- Weeping Tile (1992–1998)
- West End Girls (1990–1994)
- Western Mustang Band (1937–)
- The Wet Secrets (2005–)
- The Wet Spots (2003–)
- What's He Building in There? (2006–2010)
- Wheat Chiefs (1990–1998)
- The Wheat Pool (2004–2012)
- Whiskey Howl (1969–1972)
- White Lung (2006–)
- White Wires (2007–)
- White Wolf (1975–2007)
- Whitehorse (2011–)
- Why (1993–)
- Wide Mouth Mason (1995–)
- Widelife (2002–2005)
- Wild Rivers
- Wild Strawberries (1988–)
- Wild T and the Spirit (1990–)
- The Wilderness of Manitoba (2009–)
- Wildlife (2005–)
- The Wilkinsons (1998–2009)
- Will (1991–1992)
- Will Currie and the Country French (2006–)
- The Wilsons (2006–2012)
- The Wind Whistles (2006–)
- Windsor Police Pipe Band (1967–)
- Windsor Symphony Orchestra (1941–)
- Windwalker (1990–1993)
- Winnipeg's Most (2010–2012)
- The Winnipeg Singers (2001–)
- Winnipeg Symphony Orchestra (1947–)
- Winter Equinox (2004–2006)
- Winter Gloves (2008–)
- Wintersleep (2001–)
- Wireless (1976–1980)
- Wolf Parade (2003–)
- Women (2007–2012)
- Wonderful Grand Band (1978–)
- The Wooden Sky (2007–)
- Wooden Stars (1994–)
- Woodhands (2005–)
- Woodpigeon (2006–)
- Woods of Ypres (2002–2011)
- Wool on Wolves (2008–)
- World on Edge (1990–1994)
- Wrabit (1977 - 198?)
- Wyatt (2004–)
- Wyrd Sisters (1990–)

== X ==
- X-Quisite (2002–2005)

== Y ==
- Yamantaka // Sonic Titan (2007–)
- Yoo Doo Right
- You+Me (2014–)
- You Know I Know (1997–)
- You Say Party (2004–)
- Young (1971–1973)
- Young and Sexy (1998–)
- Young Canadians (1979–1980)
- Young Empires (2009–)
- Young Galaxy (2005–)
- Young Liars (2008–2016)
- The Young Novelists (2009–)
- Young Rival (2007–)
- Young Saints (1986–1993)
- Young Scouts
- Your Favorite Enemies (2006–)
- Yukon Blonde (2005–)

== Z ==
- Zaraza (1993–)
- Zébulon (1994–2008)
- Zeds Dead (2009–)
- Zekuhl (1991–)
- Zen Bamboo (2017–)
- Zerbin (2009–)
- Zeroscape (2001–)
- Zex (2013–)
- Zeus (2009–)
- The Zilis (2012–2017)
- Zimmers Hole (1991–)
- The Zolas (2009–)
- Zolty Cracker (1989–1997)
- Zombie Girl (2006–)
- Zon (1977–1981)
- Zoo Legacy (2010–)
- Zoon (2018–)
- Zubot and Dawson (1998–2003)
- Zuckerbaby (1996–2001)
- Zumpano (1992–1996)

== See also ==
- List of bands from British Columbia
- Category:Canadian musical groups
- Category:Canadian record labels
- Category:Music festivals in Canada
- List of Canadian musicians
