= Vacuity =

Vacuity can refer to:

- Emptiness, the human condition
- Vacuum, the absence of matter
- Śūnyatā, the Buddhist term about the impermanent nature of form
- Vacuity (band), an alternative rock band from Kitchener, Ontario
- A song by French metal band Gojira, from the album The Way Of All Flesh (2008)
