= Vincat =

Canadian psychedelic pop band

- Origin: Victoria, British Columbia, Canada
- Genres: Indie rock; psychedelic; alt pop
- Years active: 2004–2009
- Members: Kristian North - Vocals, guitar, keyboards Crystal Dorval - vocals, guitar, bass Danny Costello - drums, percussion, keyboards

Vincat was a Canadian three-piece psychedelic pop band from Victoria, British Columbia.

== Discography ==
=== Albums ===
- Hoi Polloi - independent release 2009
- I like their older stuff better - independent release 2005

=== EPs ===
- Earthly Rotations - independent release 2009
- Inner Space - independent release 2007

=== Singles ===
- "The Brightest" (Single) - Do The Mint Twist Mint Records - 2007
- "Werewolves" (Single) - The Aaargh Annual Aaargh Records - 2007

== See also ==
- List of bands from Canada
