= Pony Girl (band) =

Award-winning Canadian band

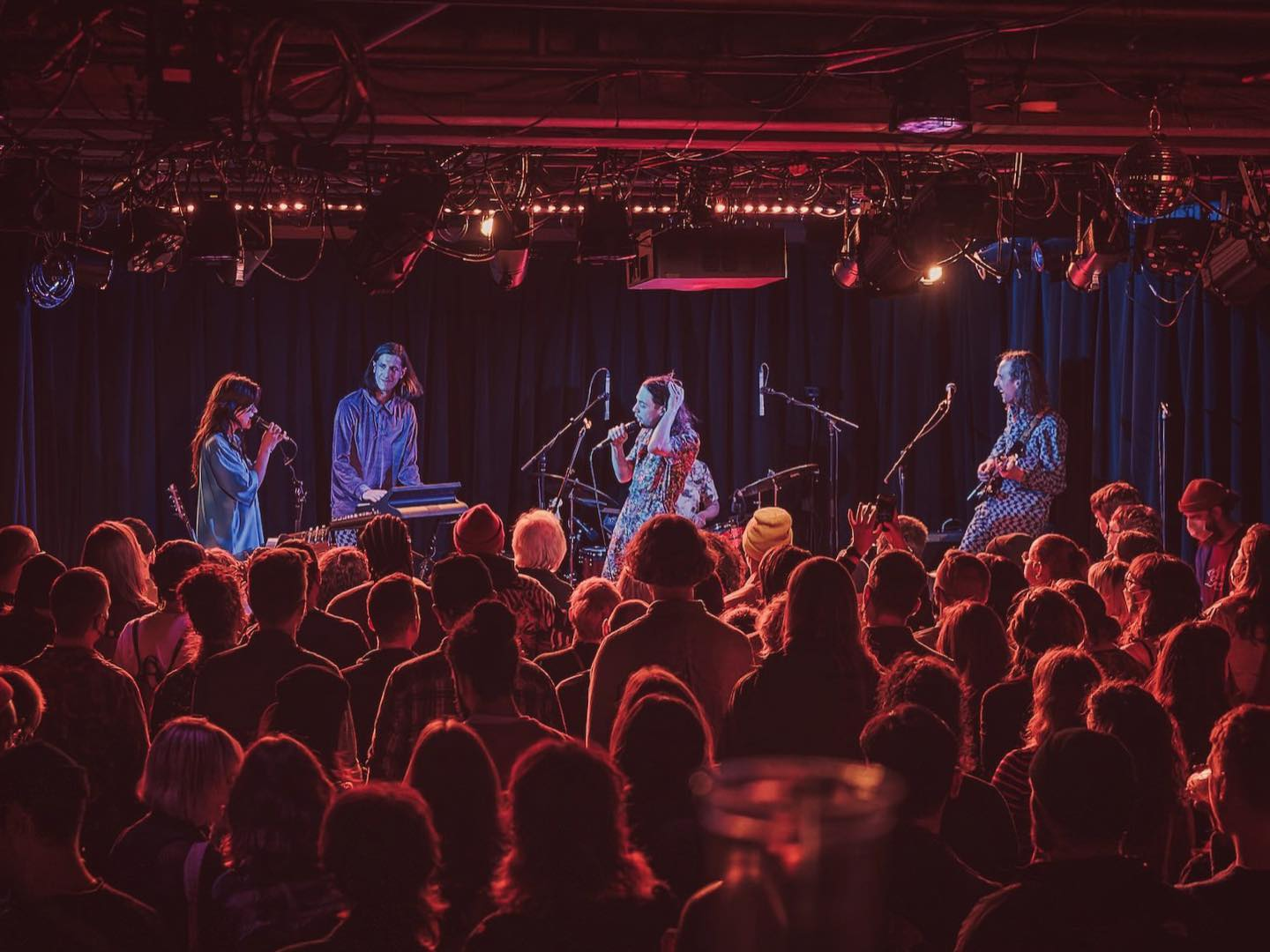
- Pony Girl performing in Canada in 2022

Background information
- Origin: Ottawa, Ontario, Canada
- Genres: Indie rock, art rock, art pop
- Years active: 2012–present
- Labels: Paper Bag Records, So Sorry Records, Pop Drone
- Members: Pascal Huot; Julien Dussault; Greggory Clark; Yolande Laroche; Mili Hong
- Past members: Jeff Kingsbury; Michel Cousineau; Isaac Vallentin; Cameron Hill
- Website: ponygirl.ca

Pony Girl is a Canadian indie art rock band from Ottawa, Ontario, formed in 2012. Their records have appeared on North American college radio charts and in rotation on CBC Radio, CBC Music, CBC Radio 3 as well as Radio-Canada and SiriusXM.

The group recorded several albums and EPs on Canadian indie labels Pop Drone and So Sorry Records between 2012 and 2015. After signing to Paper Bag Records they released Enny One Wil Love You (2022) and Laff It Off (2023) which was an Exclaim! Magazine Staff Pick of the year.

== History ==
Pascal Huot is the principal songwriter, as well as vocalist and guitarist. The other songwriters and members are guitarist Julien Dussault, bassist Greggory Clark, percussionist Jeff Kingsbury and multi-instrumentalist Yolande Laroche. Kingsbury joined the band in 2013.

Huot is also a filmmaker whose Pony Girl music videos have been selected by juried film festivals in Canada and the United States.

In 2022, they signed to Paper Bag Records following earlier releases to Pop Drone and So Sorry Records.

Pony Girl has toured extensively across Canada. In 2024, they were invited to showcase at SXSW in Austin, Texas, marking the band's debut performance in the United States.

Pony Girl has been nominated a record-high 11 times for Capital Music Awards with multiple wins in 2023 and 2024.

== Discography ==
- 2012: "Take Me" (Single)
- 2013: Show Me Your Fears
- 2015: Foreign Life
- 2022: Enny One Wil Love You
- 2023: Laff It Off

== Awards and nominations ==
Year	Award	Category	Result	Ref
2024	Capital Music Awards	Album of the Year	Nominated	
2024	Capital Music Awards	Best Production & Arrangements	Nominated	
2024	Capital Music Awards	Single of the Year	Won	
2024	Capital Music Awards	Songwriter of the Year	Nominated	
2024	Capital Music Awards	Video of the Year	Nominated	
2023	Capital Music Awards	Album of the Year	Nominated	
2023	Capital Music Awards	Group of the Year	Nominated	
2023	Capital Music Awards	Single of the Year	Won	
2023	Capital Music Awards	Video of the Year	Won	
2023	Capital Music Awards	Songwriter of the Year	Nominated	
2023	Capital Music Awards	Best Production & Arrangements	Nominated	
2016	Le Prix FEQ	Emerging Artist Award	Won	

== See also ==
- Canadian rock
- List of bands from Canada
