= Sexual Assault (band) =

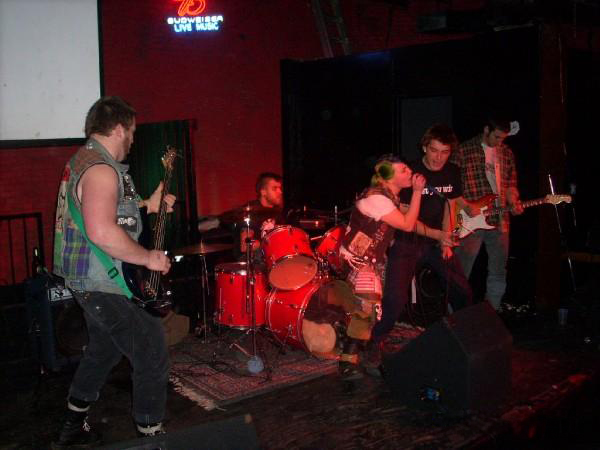
- Sexual Assault, performing at L3, St Catharines, 2008

Background information
- Origin: St. Catharines, Ontario, Canada
- Genres: Punk, street punk
- Years active: 2008–2011
- Label: independent

Sexual Assault was a Canadian punk band from St. Catharines, Ontario.

== History ==
=== Controversy ===
The band was developing notoriety due to a campaign, led by the Niagara Sexual Assault Center, and Feminine Action Collective trying to get the band to change its name. Opposing groups say the band is violating human rights and turning Sexual Assault into a casual issue. The band denies such claims, saying that their name and music are open to interpretation.

== See also ==
- List of bands from Canada
