= Blue Daven's Code =

Canadian modern rock band

- Origin: Quebec City, Canada
- Genres: Hard rock, Modern Rock
- Years active: 2010–2016
- Labels: Native Alien Records
- Members: Jesse Mercier; Mathieu Giroux; Jean-Pierre Parent; Mathieu Gagné

Blue Daven's Code was a Canadian modern rock band, formed in 2010 in Quebec City. Its members were Jesse "Jessy" Mercier (guitar), Mathieu "Gee" Giroux (bass, vocals), Jean-Pierre "JP" Parent (drums) and Mathieu "Code" Gagné (guitar, vocals). Their style blended hard rock, and modern rock with elements from stoner rock and country music styles. They called it an evolution of the rock music from the 1990s.

== History ==
In 2011, Blue Daven's Code finished second in Budweiser's "Omnium du Rock", a battle of the bands in the province of Quebec, beating out 42 bands in the process. The band then released the Wild Side EP on iTunes, and two music videos for the first single "Ph.D." as well as "A Killer Next Door". They toured the United States and Canada, and had radio airplay at a number of stations, including in California, Nevada and Oregon.

In 2013, BDC recorded the single "Dangerous" with Toronto producer Ross Hayes Citrullo (Time Giant, Monster Truck, The Sheepdogs). Their album "Blue Daven's Code" was released in September 2014, on CD and as a digital download.

The band broke up in 2016. In 2017, Giroux, Parent and Mercier formed the band Velvet Black.

== Discography ==
- 2013: Wild Side (EP)
- 2014: "Dangerous" (single)
- 2014: Blue Daven's Code (EP)
