= Robyn and Ryleigh =

Canadian country music duo

- Origin: Langley, British Columbia, Canada
- Genre: Country
- Label: Royalty Records
- Members: Robyn Gillespie; Ryleigh Gillespie
- Website: www.robynandryleigh.com

Robyn and Ryleigh Gillespie are a sister duo of country/pop singer-songwriters from Langley, British Columbia.

In 2013, their self-titled debut album Robyn and Ryleigh was released on Raincoast Music/MDM Recordings.

Robyn & Ryleigh were signed to Royalty Records in 2015, and have distribution through Sony Music Entertainment. The sisters released a single with Royalty called "I Found You" on 18 May 2015.

Robyn and Ryleigh were nominated in 2015 for British Columbia Country Music Association awards (BCCMA Awards) in the categories of Group/Duo of the Year, Songwriter of the Year, and Website of the Year.

== Discography ==
=== Studio albums ===
Title	Details
Robyn and Ryleigh	Release date: 16 July 2013; Label: MDM Recordings
By Heart	Release date: 15 January 2016; Label: Royalty Records

=== Singles ===
Year	Single	Album
2013	"Just Another Sundown"	Robyn and Ryleigh
2015	"I Found You"	By Heart

=== Music videos ===
Year	Video
2012	"Our Own Way Of Loving"
2013	"Just Another Sundown"
2015	"I Found You"
2015	"By Heart"
