= Oakville Ensemble =

Musikay is a professional choir and orchestra based in Oakville, Ontario, Canada. Musikay was founded in 2005 under the name Oakville Chamber Choir (renamed 'Oakville Chamber Ensemble' in 2007 and then 'Oakville Ensemble' in 2010) by Artistic Director Stephane Potvin, a Quebec born conductor who also served as Resident Conductor and Artistic Administrator to the Thunder Bay Symphony Orchestra.

In 2006, Musikay grew to eight voices and presented its first concert as part of the Boris Brott Summer Music Festival. In the spring of 2007, the group offered its first self-presented performance. In the fall of that same year, the group was renamed the Oakville Chamber Ensemble and began to offer a full series of 5 concerts per season. A few seasons later, to avoid confusion with other local groups similarly named, the Oakville Chamber Ensemble was renamed Musikay.

Currently, Musikay has a sixteen-voice chamber choir and an orchestra and delivers six to eight concerts per season at various churches in Oakville, Hamilton, and surrounding cities performing works from the past (Bach, Byrd, Haydn) and present, including works by Canadian composers, such as Srul Irving Glick, Donald Patriquin, and upcoming composer Jared Hynnes.

As part of its regular concerts, Musikay offers theme based concerts for Lent, Easter, and Mother's Day. Since 2009 Musikay performs an annual Messiah (Handel) concert and sing-along at Christmas.
