= The Skitzos =

Canadian punk rock band active from 2005 to 2008

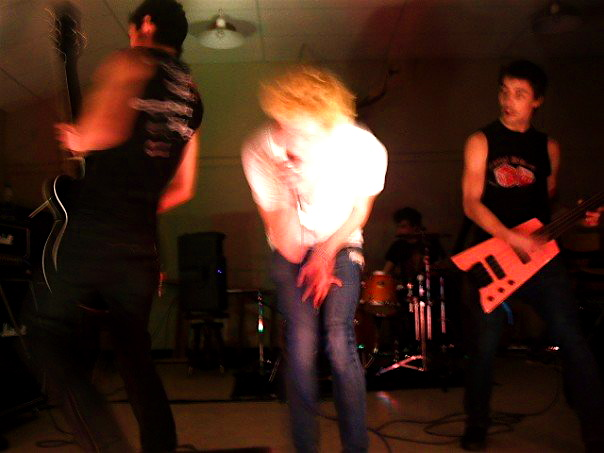
- The Skitzos live in Okotoks, February 24, 2007.

Background information
- Origin: Calgary, Alberta, Canada
- Genres: Punk rock
- Years active: 2004–2008
- Label: Longshot Music
- Past members: Ryder Thalheimer (vocals); Mark McLennan (guitar); Aaron Arseneau (bass); Josh Boley (drums)

The Skitzos were a Canadian punk rock band from Calgary, Alberta, Canada. They performed around Western Canada from 2005 until 2008. Members included: Aaron Arseneau (bass), Josh Boley (drums), Mark McLennan (guitar), and Ryder Thalheimer (vocals).

== History ==
The Skitzos formed in north east Calgary in 2004. Original guitarist Geoff Reynard quit just after releasing their independent demo Modern Youth; Mark McLennan then took over guitar, and months later The Skitzos began preparing to release what would become the Faster Louder Better! EP. Despite working hard, The Skitzos never achieved mainstream success.

== Discography ==
- Modern Youth EP (2005)
- Faster Louder Better! EP (2007, Longshot Music).
