= Zex (band) =

- Origin: Ottawa, Ontario, Canada
- Genres: Punk rock
- Years active: 2013–2019
- Members: Gretchen Steel; Jo Capitalicide; Gab Hole; Mark Useless
- Past members: Tasha; Vassil Mester
- Website: zexzexzex.com

Zex is a punk and metal band from Canada, founded in 2013. Its members are Gab Hole (Bass), Mark Useless (Drums) Gretchen Steel (Vocals) and Jo Capitalicide (Guitar). They gained international notoriety in September 2017 when a German record pressing plant accidentally pressed ZEX's music on to Beyoncé's Limited edition yellow Lemonade Euro Pressing.

Zex has toured Canada and the United States to support their albums Fight For Yourself and Uphill Battle, as well as several well reviewed singles.

== Discography ==
=== Fight For Yourself (2014) ===
- 1. Fight for Yourself 2:54
- 2. Wild Blood 3:14
- 3. We're Rebels 2:18
- 4. Screaming At the Wall 2:31
- 5. XXX 2:39
- 6. Wanderlust 2:49
- 7. World of Trash 3:15
- 8. Break Free 2:47
- 9. On Our Own 3:13
- 10. Savage City 3:31

=== Uphill Battle (2017) ===
- 1. No Sanctuary 03:19
- 2. Cold War 03:13
- 3. Child Soldier 03:16
- 4. Let Them In 02:39
- 5. Burn The Flag 03:51
- 6. Iron Will 02:43
- 7. Murdered 03:11
- 8. Steel Gates 04:18
- 9. Give It All 03:30
- 10. Bad Decisions 03:08
