= Visible Wind =

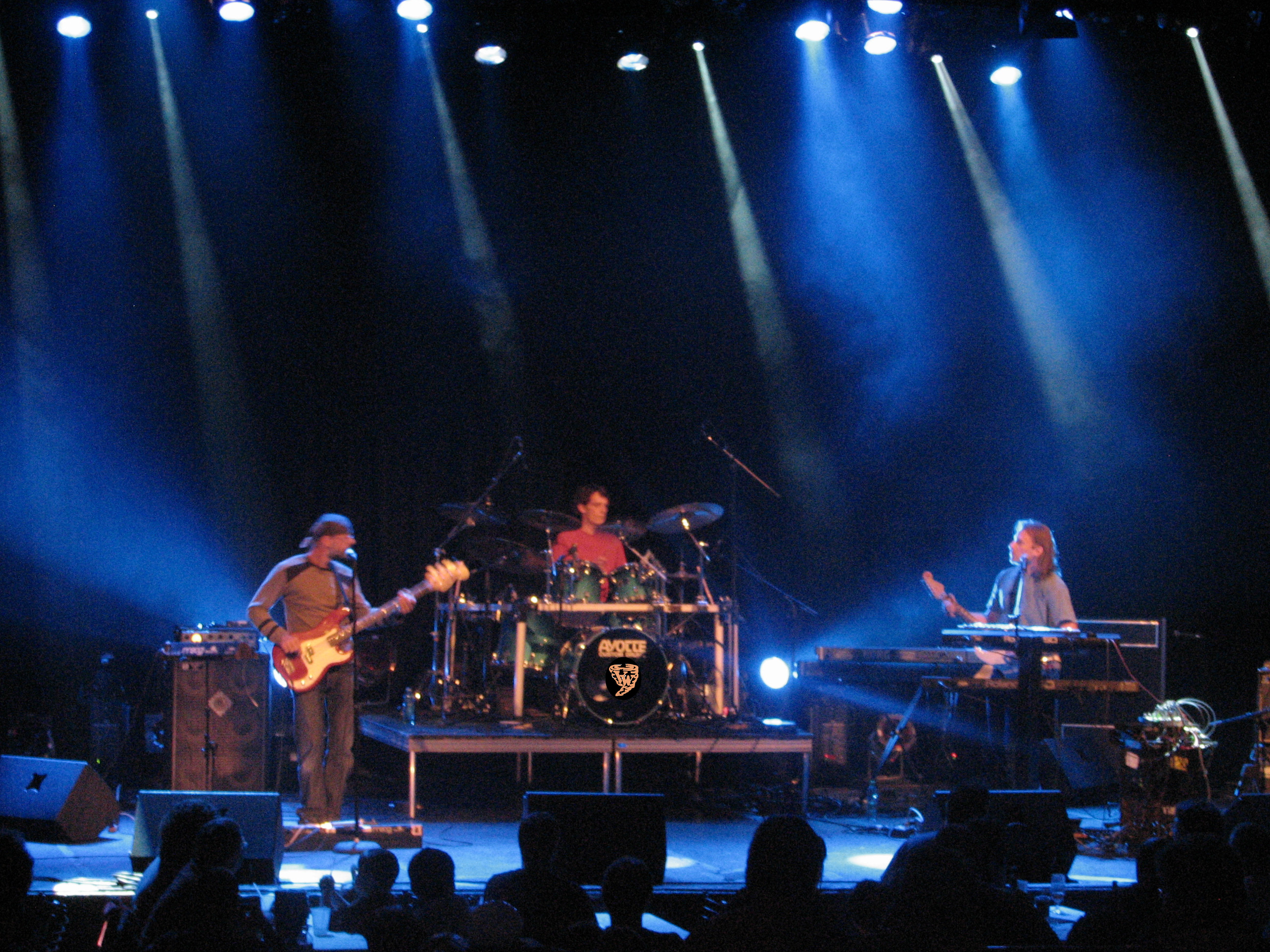
- Visible Wind
- Website: users.aei.ca/vwind/

Visible Wind was a Canadian progressive rock band from the province of Québec formed in 1983.

== Band members ==
- Stephen Geysens - keyboards, vocals
- Luc Hébert - drums
- Louis Roy - bass guitar
- Philippe Woolgar - guitar, vocals (albums 1,2,5 and 6)
- Claude Rainville - guitar (albums 3 and 4)

== Discography ==
Studio albums

- Catharsis (1988)
- A Moment Beyond Time (1991)
- Emergence (1994)
- Narcissus Goes to the Moon (1996)
- Barb-à-Baal-a-Loo (2001)

Live albums

- La Dæmentia Romantica (Live in Mexicali) (2006)
