= Five O'Clock Charlie =

- Origin: Edmonton, Alberta, Canada
- Genres: rock/pop
- Years active: 2001–2007
- Past members: Craig Schram; Steve Tchir; Dave Meagher; Trevor Belley

Five O'Clock Charlie was a Canadian pop/rock band from Edmonton, Alberta.

== History ==
Five O'Clock Charlie was formed in 2001. It was originally a side project of singer/songwriter Craig Schram's ska/punk band, Tunuki; Schram was joined by Tunuki guitarist Steve Tchir. In 2002, Dave Meagher joined the band on drums and glockenspiel, and in the same year Trevor Belley joined the band on bass guitar.

In 2002, the band released an EP titled Redtown. Its debut full-length album, Five O'Clock, was released in 2004, and their song "Five O'Clock" appeared on local radio charts.

Five O'Clock Charlie disbanded in 2007, shortly after the release of their EP Watercolours. In December 2007, Five O'Clock Charlie played a farewell show at the Pawnshop in Edmonton, Alberta with Edmonton rockers, Mark Birtles Project.
