= Raleigh (band) =

RALEIGH
- Origin: Calgary, Alberta, Canada
- Years active: 2010–present
- Label: independent
- Members: Brock Geiger, Clea Anaïs, Matt Doherty, Will Maclellan
- Website: https://www.raleigh-sound.com/

RALEIGH is a Canadian experimental indie-rock band from Calgary, Alberta. Born out of a collaboration between songwriters Brock Geiger and Clea Anais in 2010, the band has evolved to currently include Matt Doherty (drums) and Will Maclellan (bass).

The band has released two full-length records independently, New Times in Black and White (2011), and Sun Grenades & Grenadine Skies (2013) and has toured extensively in Canada. Both albums charted on the Canadian Earshots National Top 50.

In support of Sun Grenades & Grenadine Skies, the band also toured for three weeks in the UK and Germany.

== Discography ==
- Powerhouse Bloom (September 29, 2017)
- Remixed Sun Grenades EP (May 1, 2014)
- Sun Grenades & Grenadine Skies (November 5, 2013)
- New Times in Black and White (May 24, 2011)
