= The Parkdale Revolutionary Orchestra =

The Parkdale Revolutionary Orchestra is a chamber-pop band located in Toronto that formed in 2005.

== Truth in the Dark ==
Truth in the Dark

Studio album by The Parkdale Revolutionary Orchestra
- Released: January 4, 2008
- Genre: Alternative/Pop

The Parkdale Revolutionary Orchestra chronology
Truth in the Dark (2008)	The Torture Memos (2010)

Truth in the Dark is the first studio album by Canadian pop-alternative group The Parkdale Revolutionary Orchestra. The album was released in December 2007 physically, and was released to iTunes on January 4, 2008.

=== Reception ===
The album received positive reviews, praising lead singer Kristin Mueller-Heaslip's "fraught, full-throttle operatic vocals", and pianist Benjamin Mueller-Heaslip's "unique and uncompromised" compositions and arrangements.

=== Track listing ===
Truth in the Dark
No.	Title	Writer(s)	Length
1.	"Impostor"	Karl Mohr	1:51
2.	"Driving Me Backwards"	Brian Eno	5:07
3.	"Truth in the Dark"	Benjamin Mueller-Heaslip	3:14
4.	"I Didn’t Sleep"	Benjamin Mueller-Heaslip	2:34
5.	"Recurrents"	Ian Revell	3:51
6.	"Elevator"	Karl Mohr	4:13
7.	"Comet"	Wire	2:59
8.	"Blue Bolero"	Benjamin Mueller-Heaslip	3:41
9.	"Let’s Fall in Love"	M."B".Kaler	4:07
10.	"I’ll Try"	Geoff Marshall	4:05
11.	"The Death of Arafat"	Benjamin Mueller-Heaslip	4:29
12.	"Lost In The Stars"	Kurt Weill	2:49

The Torture Memos

Studio album by The Parkdale Revolutionary Orchestra
- Released: December 1, 2009
- Genre: Alternative/Pop

The Parkdale Revolutionary Orchestra chronology
Truth In The Dark (2007)	The Torture Memos (2009)

== The Torture Memos ==
The Torture Memos is the second studio album by Canadian pop-alternative group The Parkdale Revolutionary Orchestra. Unlike the band's first album, their sophomore record is written as a concept album, revolving around a series of documents produced by the United States' Office of Legal Council between 2002 and 2005. The text in the lyrics is taken directly from these documents. The album was released to iTunes and CD Baby on December 1, 2009. The album in its entirety was first performed live at the Tranzac Club in Toronto, Ontario on June 6, 2009, and the video footage of the performance was released to the band's official YouTube channel. Additionally, a music video for the song "Good Faith" was released. The video is a stop-motion animation film, and was shot by Benjamin Mueller-Heaslip.

=== Track listing ===
The Torture Memos
No.	Title	Length
1.	"You Have Asked Us To Address"	2:40
2.	"The Interrogators Remove The Hood"	2:40
3.	"This Sensation Is Based Upon A Deeply Rooted Physiological Response"	3:50
4.	"The Ultimate Question Is"	1:55
5.	"Technique"	3:11
6.	"Medical Personnel Are On The Scene"	2:34
7.	"Drawing Distinctions Between Gradations Of Pain Is Not An Easy Task"	2:29
8.	"Good Faith"	3:50
9.	"Self Defense"	2:38
10.	"Authority"	2:12
11.	"Please Let Us Know If We May Be Of Further Assistance"	3:46
