= We Love Danger! =

We Love Danger
- Origin: Quebec City, Quebec, Canada
- Genres: Melodic hardcore, punk rock, skate punk
- Years active: 2009–present
- Labels: Indie
- Members: Bruno Charest; Remy Verreault; Alex Bergeron; Sonny Letourneau
- Website: welovedanger.com

We Love Danger! (abbreviated as WLD!) is a punk rock band from Quebec City, Canada formed in January 2009. Many people have referenced them playing a 90's style of melodic punk rock.

== History ==
In 2009, Remy Verreault (ex-GFK, ATM, CP101) and Sonny Letourneau (ex-GFK, Senseless, SonOfaBeat) were looking to start a state of the art punk rock band with the will to bring back this melodic kind of punk seen in the 90's. To do so, they asked long-time friend Bruno Charest (ex-Dual Peak, Crane, Pressure) who joined in to form what will be shortly after known as We Love Danger!

The band rehearsed for a while and finally played shows with numerous bands (Propagandhi, Bad Religion and more) in their career debut. After almost a year of work, WLD! realised that they needed another guitar player to enlarge the sound and add melody to their original recipe. A couple of good contacts in Quebec's music scene referenced Alex Bergeron (ex-Twenty Big Mistakes) as a talented guitarist that could greatly fill this position. Alex accepted the challenge and joined in October 2009. His addition helped widen the horizons of We Love Danger! in terms of sound and ideas.

The band is into their own studio since April 2010 to record what will be their debut Full-Length album. The name for this album and the official release date will be known at the beginning of 2011.

We Love Danger! will go into a European tour kicking off on April 8, 2011. Their first show will take place in London at the Relentless Garage with UK punk legends The Boys.

Their first full-length "Stuck in standards" is out since September 1, 2011 on all the digital distribution sites (iTunes, Spotify, Cdbaby, etc.) and also on www.reverbnation.com for physical copies. The album contains 11 state of the art 90's melodic punk-rock songs.

== Band members ==
=== Current members ===
- Bruno Charest – Guitar, vocals
- Sonny Letourneau – Bass, vocals
- Alex Bergeron – Guitar, backing vocals
- Remy Verreault – Drums, backing vocals

== Discography ==
- The Failure (EP) (2009)
