= The Wind Whistles =

Canadian duo

- Origin: Vancouver, British Columbia, Canada
- Genre: Indie folk
- Years active: 2006–present
- Label: aaahh records
- Members: Tom Prilesky; Liza Moser

The Wind Whistles are a Canadian indie folk duo founded in spring 2006. The group consists of Tom Prilesky (vocals, guitar) and Liza Moser (vocals, bass), with a rotating cast of musical support both live and recorded. They were one of the first groups to gain prominence in the Creative Commons music movement.

They have recorded four albums, with musical styles that span anti-folk, roots revival, twee, pop and alternative rock, and americana, with lyrical themes about death/revival, empathy for living things, and DIY culture. Many of these musing are delivered in fun and endearing ways using animal characters and paying tribute to friends and family. The Wind Whistles toured extensively in Europe and Canada from 2006–2010.

In the decade following a hiatus from performing live, they have produced a farewell album called Sail Away, again enlisting musical help from their community. Tom is now working on the musical projects innerouter and TPRIL.

== Discography ==
- windowsills (LP, 2007)
- Animals are People Too (LP, 2009)
- The Secret Album (LP, 2009)
- Sail Away (LP, 2020)
