= The Happy Pals =

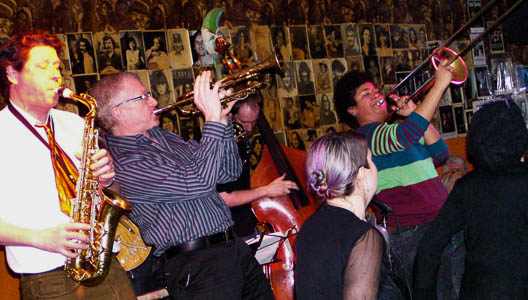
- The Happy Pals in performance

Background information
- Origin: Toronto, Ontario, Canada
- Genres: Swing, blues, ragtime, jazz
- Years active: 1968 – present
- Members: Patrick Tevlin; Laurent Humeau; Mike Evin; Roberta Tevlin; Ben Lee; Lucas Gadke; Chuck Clarke
- Website: www.happypals.ca

The Happy Pals New Orleans Party Orchestra are a New Orleans traditional dance hall jazz band which was formed in 1968 by Clifford "Kid" Bastien, originally named Kid Bastien's Camelia Jazz band.

The Happy Pals are a classic New Orleans style ensemble which includes trumpet, trombone, clarinet, banjo, piano, double bass, and drums. They are inspired by the early jazz and blues music of the 1920s and 1930s. The Happy Pals have been playing New Orleans dance hall jazz in Toronto for over four decades. They have also played throughout the United States and tour Europe annually.

== History ==
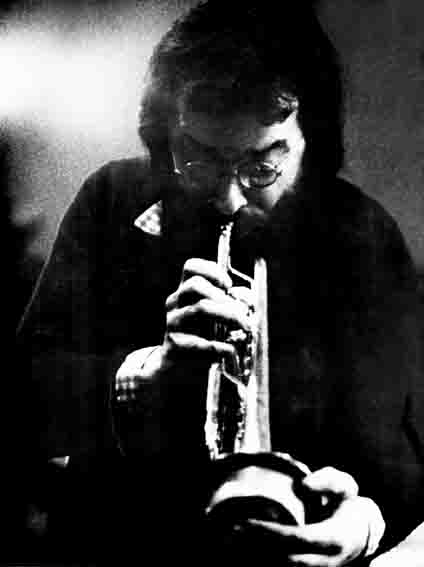
Kid Bastien in the 1970s

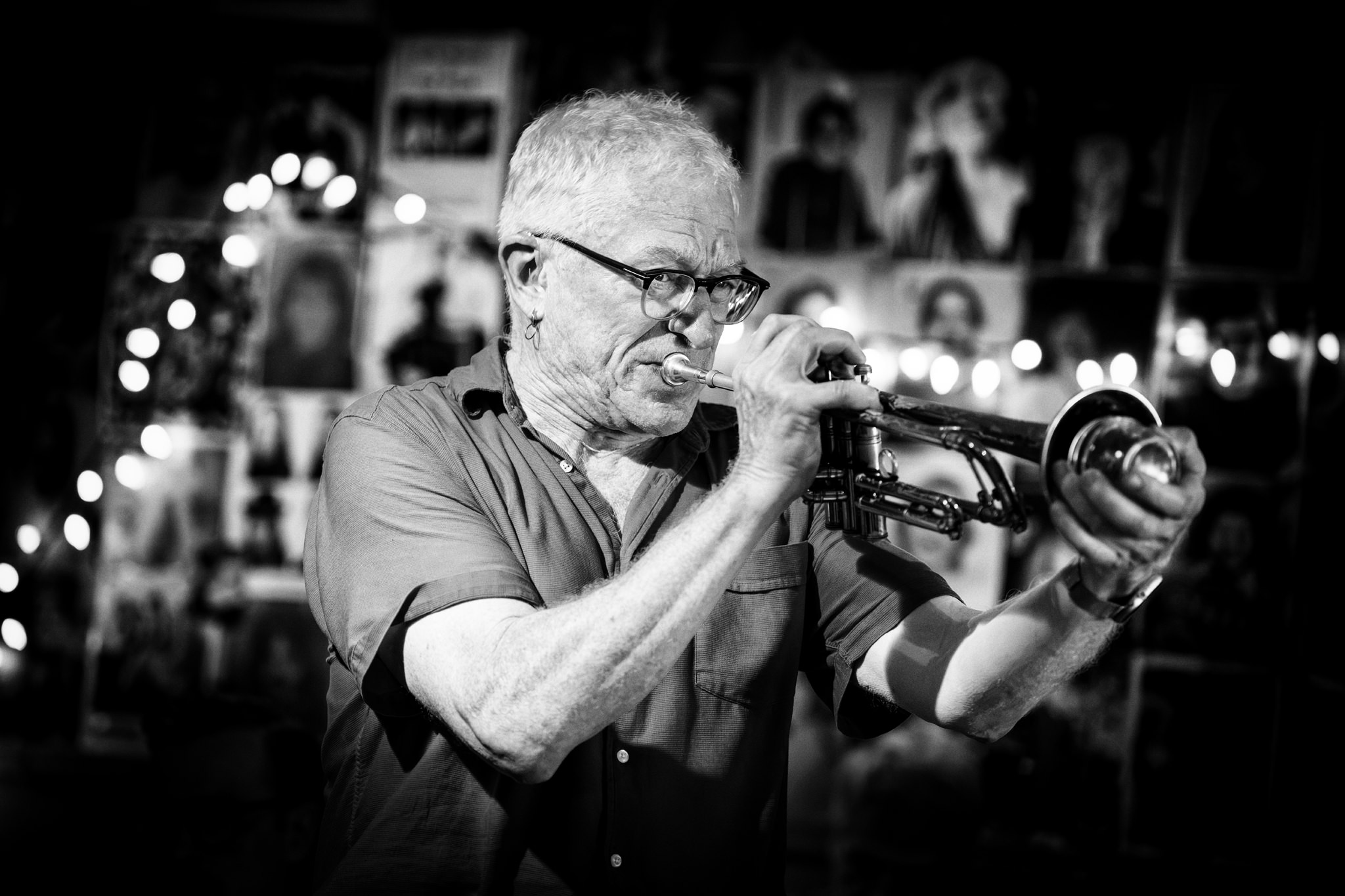
Patrick Tevlin in Grossman’s Tavern (Toronto, July 2026)

Clifford "Kid" Bastien was born in London, England's East End in 1937. Bastien immigrated to Canada in 1962 after a brief stint in New Orleans. Bastien earned a reputation as a "guru of New Orleans jazz in Toronto". In 1968, Bastien founded the Kid Bastien's Camelia Jazz band, later to be renamed The Happy Pals. Bastien was now considered to be the foremost disciple of New Orleans trumpet legend Kid Thomas Valentine, whom Bastien had first witnessed playing at a neighborhood dance, at the Westwego Louisiana firehall. Bastien also gained a reputation for outlasting the revolving door of bar owners at Grossmans Tavern, and having personalities such as Woody Allen appear with him onstage.

On February 8, 2003, Bastien died of a heart attack in his Toronto apartment. After Bastien's passing, tenor saxophone player Patrick Tevlin switched to the trumpet in order to take on the leadership of the group.

== Repertoire ==
The singers and composers whose material they favor include Kid Thomas Valentine, King Oliver, Fats Domino, George Lewis, Johnny Cash, Glenn Miller, Hank Williams, Frank Sinatra, and Bob Dylan.

== Musical style ==
Their music has been praised by music critics for its authenticity.

New Orleans jazz is alive and well and has taken root in, of all places, Toronto, Canada. The setting is live, the music is all New Orleans jazz swing, and the band seems to be having a heck of a party. Bourbon Street beckons for this kind of sound.

== Discography ==
- The Happy Pals with Dr. Michael White Moonlight Bay (2009)
- The Happy Pals Lost Tracks (2009)
- The Happy Pals with Brian Carrick Kid Bastien Forever Kick-Ass New Orleans Jazz Party 2007 (2007)
- The Happy Pals New Orleans Party Orchestra (2005)
- Kid Bastien's Happy Pals Live at Grossman's (1993)
- Kid Bastien's Happy Pals The Canoe Club Sessions Volume One (1989)
- Kid Bastien's Happy Pals With Norrie Cox (1988)
- Kid Bastien's Happy Pals (1984)
