= Banned from Atlantis =

Banned From Atlantis
- Origin: Winnipeg, Manitoba, Canada
- Genres: Rock, punk rock, indie
- Years active: 1990–1995
- Labels: Fresh Bread Records, Sister Records
- Past members: James Meagher; Doug McLean; Mike Germain; Lisa Smirl

Banned From Atlantis was a Winnipeg-based punk, rock, Punk rock and indie band active from 1990 to 1995.

== History ==
The band consisted of Mike Germain (vocals, lead guitar), James Meagher (drums), Lisa Smirl (bass) and Doug McLean (acoustic guitar). They signed with Fresh Bread Records and, in 1994, released a 15-track 'demo', titled Banned From Atlantis - Demo. They then released the cassettes Permanent Waves and Outie, as well as a split EP with the band Elliot (not the Kentucky band of the same name).

They then signed onto Sister Records for their 1995 release of People Write to Geena Davis in Japanese. McLean dedicated People Write to Geena Davis in Japanese to the memory of Christian J. Watson (1970–1994).

The band broke up in late 1995.

Mike Germain joined The Hummers (another Winnipeg based band) as their keyboardist in 2001 and started his own band, Mincer Ray. Meagher joined the Air Cadets, then moved to Los Angeles to start an acting career. He returned to Winnipeg with Christina Ricci (rumoured to be his girlfriend).

Mclean went on to form the Bonaduces and The Paperbacks. Lisa Smirl won a Rhodes Scholarship and became an academic in international relations living in England. She died of cancer in 2013.

== Discography ==
- Banned From Atlantis, Demo (1994), Fresh Bread
- Banned From Atlantis / Elliot (1995, EP, split with Elliot), Fresh Bread
- Outie (1995, EP), Fresh Bread
- People Write To Geena Davis In Japanese (1995), Sister Records
