= The Plastic Cloud =

Canadian psychedelic rock band

- Origin: Bay Ridges, Ontario, Canada
- Genres: Psychedelic rock; folk rock
- Years active: 1967–1968
- Label: Allied
- Past members: Brian Madill; Don Brewer; Mike Cadieux; Randy Umphrey

The Plastic Cloud was a Canadian psychedelic rock band formed in Bay Ridges, Ontario, Canada, in 1967 and which existed for approximately a year thereafter.

The Plastic Cloud, taking inspiration from The Byrds, developed one experimental album in the group's lifetime before disbanding. The Plastic Cloud's music, though not marketed successfully during the band's incarnation, has garnered interest for its innovation in the psychedelic genre.

== History ==
=== Formation ===
Formed in 1967, the band was originally a folk rock quartet composed of bassist Brian Madill, lead vocalist Don Brewer, lead guitarist Mike Cadieux, and drummer Randy Umphrey. In their beginnings, the band typically played commercially appealing folk rock songs in their live performances. Upon further development, the band began to experiment with psychedelic influences from the San Francisco Sound and Los Angeles which dominated their harder, fuzztoned musical repertoire. The band played only their own original material for the specified reason of improving the compositions by the time they could earn a recording contract.

=== Album ===
By 1968, the band received their opportunity to record their material when they signed to the Allied label. Brewer wrote all of the band's compositions and the production of the album was upheld by Jack Boswell and Bill Bessey. Recordings were enriched with psychedelic harmonizing and instrumentals. The album was highlighted by the unusual sound effects that was reminiscent of bands like The United States of America. In an attempt to include all of their influences, the first side was mainly reserved for folk rock and soft rock compositions, while the latter side derived in psychedelic and electric rock. The album, The Plastic Cloud, was released in late 1968. Despite the band's complex, new sound, the album did not become a hit as the psychedelic scene never reached the popularity it had in other areas like San Francisco. The Plastic Cloud disbanded in late 1968, but the album became a prize among record collectors. For that reason, the album managed to avoid falling into total obscurity, and the original pressings have become so sought after that prices reach $1000 to purchase one. In 2005, the album was re-released on the Pacemaker label and, even though it featured the band's full album, it failed to produce an effective history of the band so some of the band's musical inspiration remains unknown.
