= Junior Pantherz =

Canadian rock band formed 1999

- Genres: Post-rock
- Years active: 1999–2005

Junior Pantherz (or JPZ) are a Canadian post-rock music group formed in 1999 in Saskatoon, Saskatchewan, Canada. The band is named after a Sloan song "Junior Panthers". The original band featured neighborhood pals Terry Mattson on guitar/vocals, and Arnold Van Lambalgen on drums. In an eight-year span, the band released five albums and a retrospective vinyl LP collection entitled ...Discover Vinyl. JPZ are now mainly an inactive band, reappearing occasionally for one-off shows or friends' weddings.

== Gravitational Pull and Polar Opposites ==
Schoolyard chum Corey Dahlen joined in early 1999 on bass guitar, effectively forming the Power Trio. They released their first EP Gravitational Pull the same year. After a few local shows under their belt, the band released their first album Polar Opposites in 2000. It contained re-recorded songs from the first EP, as well some new numbers. Both Polar Opposites and Gravitational Pull were limited to 50 copies, which were handmade by the band and sold out quickly.

== The Last Two Million Years ==
The Last Two Million Years was released independently in 2001.

== Ballistics ==
The band's fourth release Ballistics was released independently in 2003.

== Death by Life ==
The songs on Death by Life cover much heavier topics compared to the earlier material. They released the album in June 2005 - but not without a few difficulties. While on the summer tour, the Junior Pantherz broke up. They played their last show on June 24, 2005, at Louis' Pub (a student bar in Saskatoon) with Whitey Houston and Voyd.

== Rejoice, Remain and ...Discover Vinyl ==
In 2006, Junior Pantherz reformed. Their first live return came in October 2006 when they opened for Danko Jones in Regina. The addition of Maygen Kardash (sister of bassist S.J.) on keyboards. Work begun on their sixth album shortly thereafter. The band emphasized on arrangement and instrumentation. Rejoice, Remain was released in October 2007. In addition to the album, a collection of previously released old songs was released by the Saved by Vinyl label based out of Calgary, Alberta. ...Discover Vinyl is limited to 500 numbered copies on white vinyl.

== Discography ==
- 1999 Gravitational Pull (EP)
- 2000 Polar Opposites
- 2001 The Last Two Million Years
- 2003 Ballistics
- 2005 Death By Life
- 2007 Rejoice, Remain
- 2007 Discover Vinyl (vinyl compilation)
