= Roman Grey =

Canadian band from the 1980s

- Origin: Canada
- Genre: Synthpop/Rock
- Years active: 1982–1990
- Label: Attic Records
- Members: Ross Roman, David Grey

Roman Grey was a Canadian band from the 1980s. Their music has been described as "dream pop".

== History ==
Roman Grey was formed in 1982 by Ross Roman (Rheaume) and David Grey (Smith). Their first self-titled EP release on Relativity Records became popular in Italy, and the single "Look Me in the Eyes" was played extensively on the radio and in dance clubs there.

The band found success in Canada with their 1988 album Edge of the Shadow, produced by Terry Brown. The single "IBU" appeared on the RPM Canadian Content charts that year.

== Discography ==
=== Studio albums ===
- Edge of the Shadow (1988)

=== Extended plays ===
- Roman Grey (1982)
- Body Shock (1984)

=== Singles ===
- "Look Me in the Eyes" (1982)
- "Shake Down" (1984)
- "Shangri-La" (1988)
- "I.B.U." (1988) #37 CA
