= Five Star Affair =

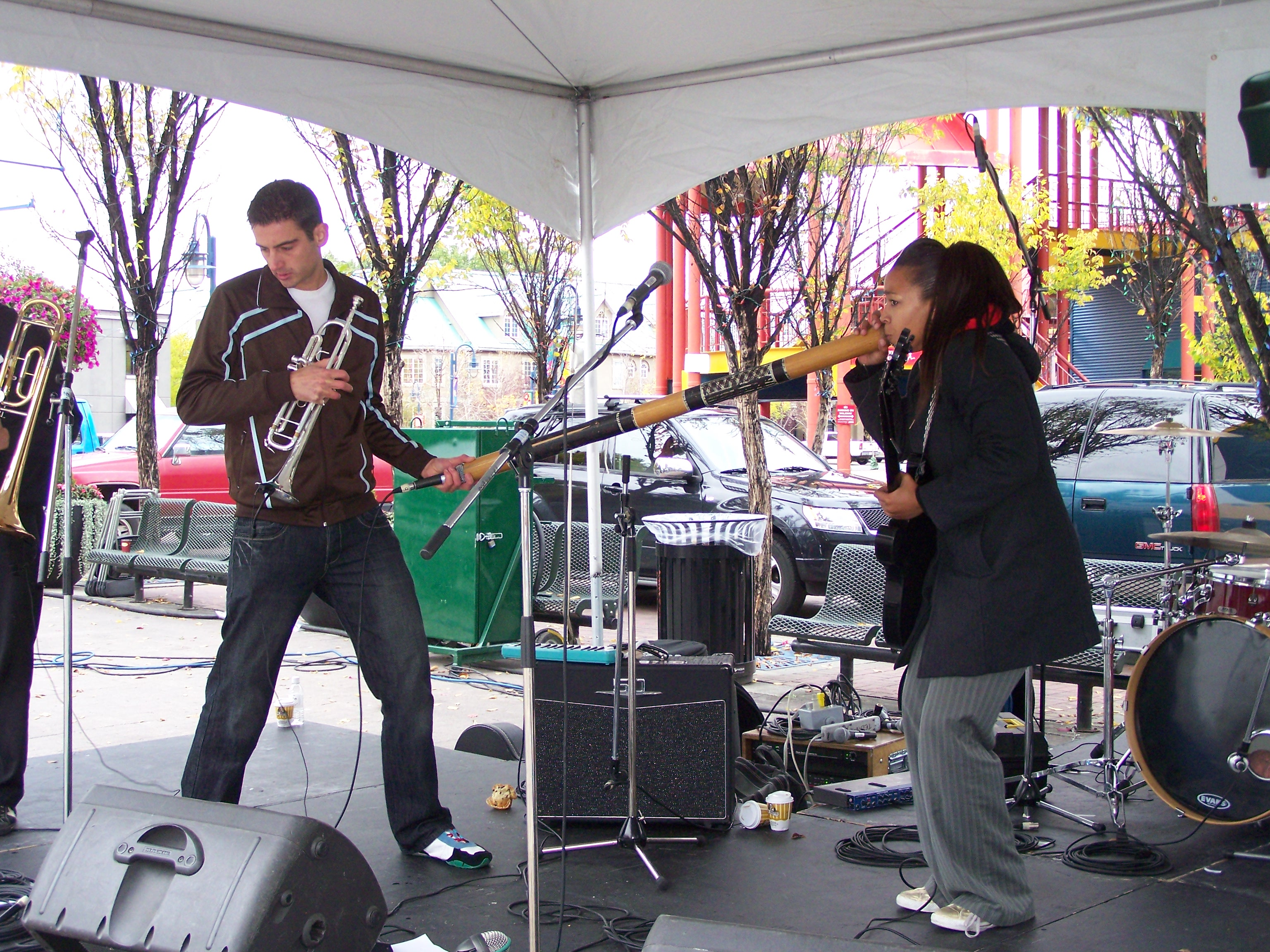
- Tristin Chanel plays the didgeridoo with Five Star Affair

Background information
- Origin: Calgary, Alberta, Canada
- Genres: ska
- Years active: 2004–present
- Members: Tristin Chanel, Jessie Robertson, Jesse Colin, Eric Elhanati, Chris Gillrie and Mark Leigh

Five Star Affair (FSA) is a Canadian ska music group formed in 2004 in Calgary, known for playing a mixture of ska, reggae, rock, and punk music. The band is made up of Tristin Chanel (vocals, rhythm guitar, and didgeridoo), Jessie Robertson (bass and vocals), Jesse Heffernan (trumpet and vocals), Chris Gillrie (lead guitar), Eric Elhanati (drums) and Mark Leigh (Trombone).

FSA released an EP Better Than What You Get At Home and, in 2006, the LP Do Not Disturb. They gained exposure outside of their hometown when they performed on the "Shiragirl" side stage of the 2005, 2006, and 2007 Warped Tours.

== Discography ==
- Better Than What You Get At Home EP
- Do Not Disturb LP, 2006
