= Blanket Barricade =

Canadian indie rock band

- Origin: Vancouver, British Columbia, Canada
- Genres: Indie-rock; Rock
- Years active: 2011-present
- Label: Modular Heart Records
- Members: Wesley Krauss; Mary-Lee Neron; Samuel Li; Steve M. Justin S. Myles Travitz
- Website: http://www.blanketbarricade.com (defunct)

Blanket Barricade is a Canadian indie rock band (music) founded by Wesley Krauss (vocals, songwriting), with Mary-Lee Neron (vocals, percussion), pianist Samuel Li, Drummer Steve M., bassist Justin S., and Myles Travitz (a.k.a. Empriser). The name of the band comes from Wesley's childhood habit of making forts out of blankets. The band's music was described as "multi-layered", "intricate", and "theatrical".

== History ==
Blanket Barricade gained popularity primarily through their music videos on YouTube, which have received over 14 million views. The band's music charted on numerous Canadian college radio stations.

The band's debut album Parade Bells was released on March 20, 2012.

The music video for the song "Stray Shadows" won best music video of the year at the Fetisch Film Festival in Germany.

In 2017, Blanket Barricade released the single "We Fit Together" and performed at a release party at Vancouver's Railway Club.
