= The Darling DeMaes =

Canadian rock band

The Darling DeMaes are a Canadian indie rock band formed in 2007 in Montreal, Quebec. The band originally consisted of guitarist and singer/songwriter Erik Virtanen, guitarist Buz (Marc-André Mongrain), bassist Nohad Adra, and vocalist/guitarist Tasha Cyr.

== Winter Keep Us Warm Acoustic EP ==
In May 2007, the DeMaes independently released their 8-song debut Winter Keep Us Warm, produced by Mark Andrew Lawson at Red Rhino Recording Studios in Montreal. The percussionless EP was recorded live-off-the-floor and was intended as a demo tape to help the band book shows. Instead, the demo was released as an acoustic EP and received critical acclamations by reviewers and charted on university radio stations. The EP features Elysia Torneria on vocal harmonies and glockenspiel.

== A User's Guide to Raising the Dead (Songs of Spring) ==
In 2008, the DeMaes received the "Independent Artists Recording" loan from F.A.C.T.O.R. and recorded their first full-length album in June 2008 in Montreal at Mountain City studio in Montreal, and had it mastered by Noah Mintz. The album now featured Tasha Cyr on vocals (alongside Virtanen), Alec Ellsworth on bass and Sami Kizilbash on drums.

Shortly after the release of User's Guide, Ellsworth, Adra and Kizilbash left, then Trevor Lashmore (bass) joined the lineup.

As of January 2011, the Darling DeMaes were in the process of recording their second full-length record.

== Discography ==
- 2007: Winter Keep Us Warm Acoustic EP
- 2008: A User's Guide to Raising the Dead (Songs of Spring)
