= Cartoon Lizard =

Canadian indie pop band

- Origin: Victoria, British Columbia, Canada
- Genres: Baroque, psychedelic pop
- Years active: 2015–present
- Label: Independent
- Members: Trevor Lang; Ritchie Hemphill; Alex Maunders; Shilo Preshyon; Brennan Doyle
- Website: cartoonlizard.com

Cartoon Lizard is a Canadian indie pop band from Victoria, British Columbia. They have released 3 mid-length EPs. The band consists of Trevor Lang, Ritchie Hemphill, Alex Maunders, Shilo Preshyon and Brennan Doyle.

== History ==
Founding members Trevor Lang and Ritchie Hemphill formed a band in high school under the name Animal Astronauts, which later disbanded, leading Lang to pursue a solo project. Meanwhile, Hemphill and Shilo Preshyon began collaborating musically while living together in Vancouver, and Preshyon and Alex Maunders discovered shared musical interests while attending Vancouver Community College. Brennan Doyle later joined Lang's solo project, which evolved into the duo Tango Lima.

After all five musicians eventually settled in Victoria, British Columbia, they decided to discontinue their previous projects and move forward together as Cartoon Lizard, a band they had long envisioned forming. Following the release of singles such as "Top of the Mornin'" and "Not Punk Not Raw," Cartoon Lizard gained attention from various Canadian media outlets for their distinctive harmonies and idiosyncratic instrumentation.

=== Not Punk Not Raw ===
In April 2017, Cartoon Lizard released their debut self-produced EP Not Punk Not Raw. The EP was sold as a limited-run cassette tape as well as in digital download form. The EP received favorable praises from various Canadian media outlets such as Exclaim, Pop Matters, Ride the Tempo, and Indie88.

=== Sentinels ===
In January 2020, Cartoon Lizard released a series of singles dropped throughout the previous two years collectively, with the addition of the title track, as their second EP, Sentinels. The EP was previously available for online streaming, though additionally was given a limited cassette tape run.

=== Bless You, Thank You ===
Cartoon Lizard released their latest and most ambitious project to date, Bless You, Thank You, on April 15, 2020 to all streaming platforms. The ten track EP is the culmination of several singles and music videos put out throughout the year. During the making of Bless You, Thank You, Brennan and Trevor were doubling in the studio working on the Haley Blais record produced by Tennis, while Shilo was tenuring with John Goodmanson on Wolf Parade's 2020 record, Thin Mind. The project is available for online streaming, digital download, and is set to have a cassette tape run.

== Musical style ==
Their music has been described as "A cool mixture of '60s influenced psychedelic sunshine pop" and "Honest, quixotic, and feel-good", with their songs demonstrating "sun-drenched harmonies and groovy, retro-sounding instrumentation", and "simultaneously nuanced and extravagant tunes". The quintet cites acts such as Animal Collective, Beach Boys, Beatles, Sufjan Stevens, Wilco, The Flaming Lips, Joanna Newsom, Frank Ocean, GBV, MBV, Talking Heads, D’Angelo, and Mouse On Mars as influences.

== Discography ==
=== Extended plays ===
List of extended plays, with year released
Title	Album details
Not Punk Not Raw	Released: April 14, 2017; Label: Self Released; Formats: digital download, streaming, Cassette
Sentinels	Released: January 4, 2020; Label: Self Released; Formats: digital download, streaming
Bless You, Thank You	Released: April 15, 2020; Label: Self Released; Formats: digital download, streaming, Cassette

=== Singles ===
- "Yes Ma'am, It's Me" (December 2017)
- "My House" (October 2018)
- "For 1 2" (December 2018)
- "Lay of the Land" (February 2019)
- "Neighboring Hotels" (March 2019)

== Members ==
=== Current members ===
- Trevor Lang (2015−present)
- Ritchie Hemphill (2015−present)
- Alex Maunders (2015−present)
- Shilo Preshyon (2015−present)
- Brennan Doyle (2015−present)
