= Distoriam =

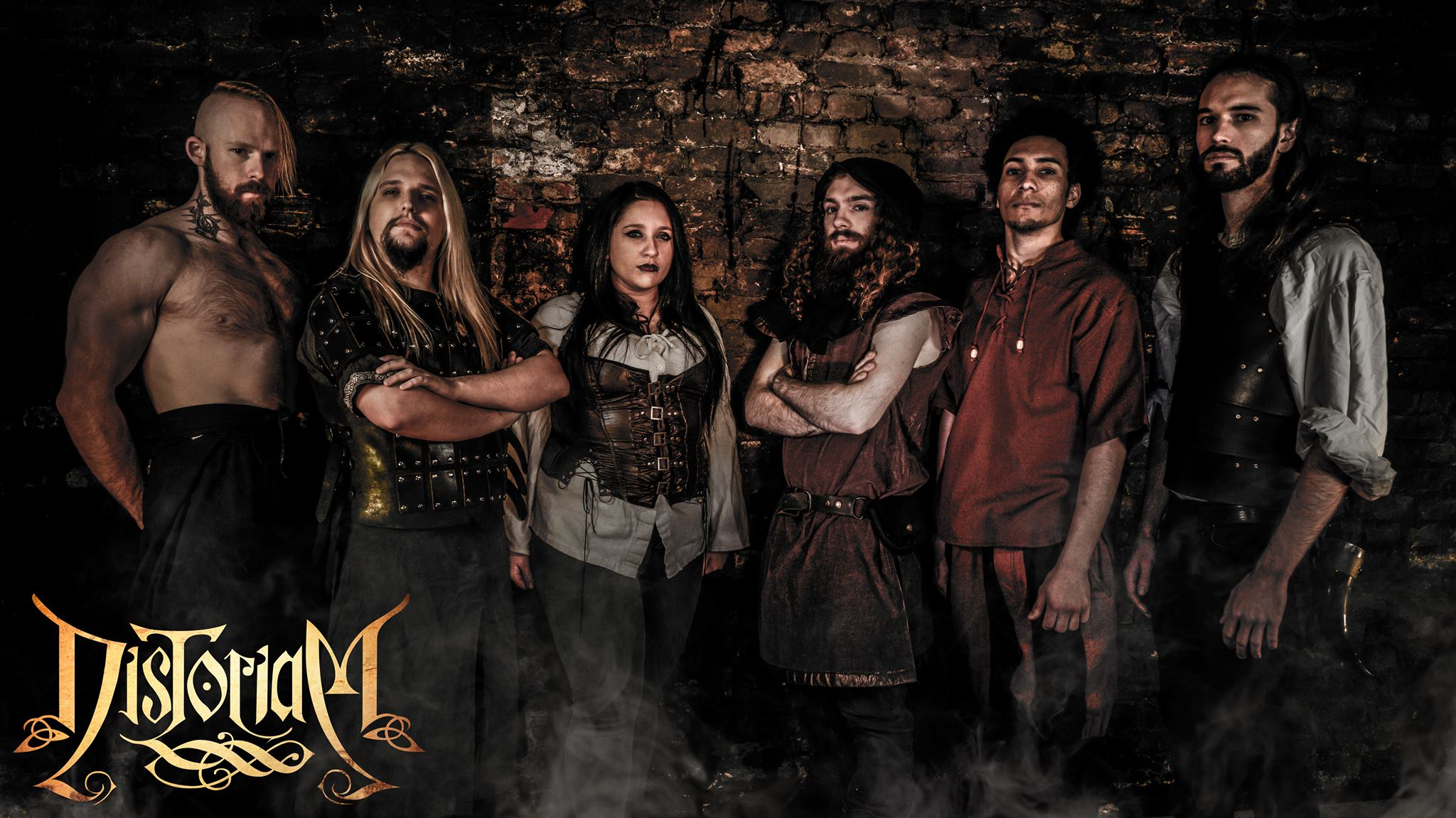
- Distoriam Promo Picture, February 20th, 2017. From left to right: François Bertrand (Ex-Member), Tommy Dufault, Sabrina Mazerolle (Ex-Member), Morgan Cassidy Beaudet, Marc-André Lépine (Ex-Member) and Yann Pouliot (Ex-Member). Not in the picture: Sophie Robillard, Pierre-Antoine Chaussé-Castonguay, David Massicotte, Erik Grenier.

Background information
- Also known as: Vinlanders (2010–2011)
- Origin: Montreal, Quebec, Canada
- Genres: Folk metal, epic metal
- Years active: 2010–present
- Members: Morgan Cassidy Beaudet; Tommy Dufault; Sophie Robillard; Pierre-Antoine Chaussé-Castonguay; David Massicotte; Erik Grenier
- Past members: Dominic Bourke; Marc-André Dugas; Sabrina Mazerolle; François Bertrand; Yann Pouliot; Marc-André Lépine; Jean-Christophe Arsenault; Arnaud Tremblay-Roy; Alexandre Pitre; Philippe Pageau; Vincent Lalumière; Philip Le rouge; Raphael Leclair; Dave Hazel
- Website: distoriam.com

Distoriam (formerly Vinlanders) is a Canadian "Epic historical" folk metal band founded by Morgan Cassidy Beaudet and Tommy Dufault in 2010. Its name was inspired by a mix of the words, History and Distortion. They are sometimes called "Canada's answer to Sabaton."

== Band members ==
Current

- Morgan (Morgan Cassidy Beaudet) – Growling vocals, Irish Bouzouki (2010–present)
- Sir Thomas Samael Friedrik Rex I (Tommy Dufault) – Clean Vocals, Rhythm Guitar (2010–present)
- Sophie the Tavern Wench (Sophie Robillard) – Keyboards, Hurdy-Gurdy, backing vocals (2012–2015, 2025–Present)
- Le-Tappeux du Pied-Chaussé (Pierre-Antoine Chaussé-Castonguay) – Drums, Mandolin, whistle, Backing vocals (2014–2015, 2025–Present)
- David Massicotte – Drums, backing vocals (2010–2013) – Bass, Backing Vocals (2025–Present)
- Éric Grenier – Lead Guitar (2025–Present, Touring member 2018–2020)

Former

- Drüminïk (Dominic Bourke) – Drums (2017–2020)
- CrowMan (Marc-André Dugas) – Bass guitar, Backing vocals (2018–2020)
- Saäb Mazerdothir (Sabrina Mazerolle) – Keytar, Backing vocals (2016–2018)
- Stormblood (Yann Pouliot) – Bass guitar, Backing vocals (2014–2018)
- Volcanthor (François Bertrand) – Lead Guitar (2017–2018)
- Marküs Blackthørn (Marc-André Lépine) – Drums (2015–2017)
- Sire Le Brave (Jean-Christophe Arsenault) – lead guitar, backing vocals (2014–2016)
- Sophie the Tavern Wench (Sophie Robillard) – Keyboards, Hurdy-Gurdy, backing vocals (2012–2015)
- Le-Tappeux du Pied-Chaussé (Pierre-Antoine Chaussé-Castonguay) – Mandolin, whistle, backing vocals (2014–2015)
- Arnaud Tremblay-Roy – Bass guitar (2010–2014)
- Alexandre Pitre – Lead Guitar (2010-2013)
- Vincent Lalumière – Keyboards (2011-2012)
- Philippe Pageau – Keyboards (2010-2011)
- Philip Le rouge (Philipp Portelance) – Lead Vocals (2010)
- Raphael Leclair – lead guitar (2010)
- Dave Hazel – Drums (2010)

Touring

- Dom Archambeault – Rhythm, Lead Guitar (2012, 2014)

== Discography ==
Demo

- Demo (2011)

EP

- Les Voyageurs (2015)
- Distrollbar (2017)

Studio albums

- Chapter I : Vinlanders (2015)
- Chapter II : ??? (To be Released)

== Music videos ==
| Year | Details | Director(s) | Album | Type | Link |
|---|---|---|---|---|---|
| 2015 | "The Call to Freedom" | François Bertrand, Tommy Dufault | Les voyageurs (EP) | Animated promo | |
| 2015 | "Us, Travelers" | François Bertrand | Les voyageurs (EP) | Lyrics video | |
| 2015 | "Venturing Forth" | Xavier Yuvens | Chapter I: Vinlanders | Narrative | |
| 2015 | "Duel of a Hundred Lights" | François Bertrand, Tommy Dufault | Chapter I: Vinlanders | Animated promo | |
| 2016 | "Steel and Steeds" | François Bertrand, Tommy Dufault | Chapter I: Vinlanders | Animated promo | |
| 2016 | "Hymn to Mead" | Xavier Yuvens | Chapter I: Vinlanders | Narrative | |
| 2017 | ''Magnetic North (Alestorm Cover) | Tommy Dufault | Distrollbar | Lyrics Video | |
