= The National Parcs =

- Origin: Montreal, Quebec, Canada
- Genre: Electronic
- Years active: 2007–present
- Members: Vincent Letellier; Chimwemwe Miller; Ian Cameron

The National Parcs are a Canadian electronic band from Montreal.

== History ==
This band’s members are Vincent Letellier, Chimwemwe Miller, and Ian Cameron. Letellier was originally known as Freeworm, with whom Miller has been collaborating as a vocalist and multi-instrumentalist since 2001. Ian Cameron joins the latter two as visual director to jointly form The National Parcs. Their first CD, Timbervision, was premiered at the Musée d'art contemporain de Montréal in November 2007.

== Style ==
They boast influences of hip-hop, baile funk, and gospel. And although their primary objective is to get people to dance to their music, lines can also be drawn towards serious music such as musique concrete (which uses taped samples of ambient noise to create a work) and also the work of Murray R. Schafer. Like Schafer, they may be considered both indigenists and internationalists, in that they have drawn from what they found locally to produce a work that is uniquely Canadian, yet would have mass appeal to people all over the world. Unlike Schafer however, The National Parcs had no clear goal in mind when they interned themselves in the northern Quebec wilderness with their audio-video recording equipment, nor did they anticipate the extent of noise pollution from civilization.

Their method then, consisted of audio-video sampling the three men’s interactions with nature; throwing sticks or stones together, the splash of a canoe paddle, the motor of an ATV. Cameron then separated the sounds from the video, so that Lettelier and Miller could manipulate them. They intentionally left the recordings minimally processed to preserve their percussive texture; then, a beat was added, and then the lyrics.

The visual element was always present to remind them of where the sounds came from, and the videos of the songs, inspired by early National Film Board nature documentaries, more than music videos are "art videos." While the visual element is at the genesis of their sound, and the band features special visual spectacles in their live performances, their songs make sense and are perfectly listenable when played on their own without the visuals.

== Critical acclaim ==
Since their debut at the Musée d’art contemporain de Montréal in November 2007, they were received with much acclaim from the artistic community. Their debut was so successful that the Musée d’art contemporain chose to feature their material during a Triennale video-music series over the summer. On March 1, 2008, The National Parcs were awarded a MIMI-GAMIQ prize for the artist that would benefit most of support in Quebec and Canada. Since then they have been touring across Canada at various folk and blues festivals. In September 2008, they plan to have a residency in Normandy, France, at a film festival.

Due to the nature-friendly content of their work, various unnamed environmental groups have heralded the Parcs. Although the appreciation for the environment is certainly there, the band members have insisted that they do not want to have the role of activists. They warn that in the future their material may feature less wilderness content, while still drawing upon the Canadian experience to create dance music with an international appeal.
