= Jump Ship Quick =

- Origin: Denver, Colorado, British Columbia, Canada
- Genres: Christian hardcore, hardcore punk, pop punk, punk rock
- Years active: 2005–present
- Labels: Thumper Punk, Punk Roxx
- Members: Nic; Jeff; Dave; J
- Website: facebook.com/JumpShipQuick

Jump Ship Quick is an American and a Canadian Christian hardcore band that primarily plays hardcore punk and punk rock. They come from Denver, Colorado and British Columbia, Canada. The band started making music in 2005, and their members are lead vocalist and bassist, Nic, guitarists, Jeff and Dave, and drummer, J. Their first studio album, Where Thieves Cannot Tread, was released in 2012 by Thumper Punk Records in association with Punk Roxx Records.

== Background ==
Jump Ship Quick is a Christian hardcore band from the areas of Denver, Colorado and British Columbia, Canada. Their members are lead vocalist and bassist, Nic, guitarists, Jeff and Dave, and drummer, J.

== Music history ==
The band commenced as a musical entity in June 2005 with their release, Where Thieves Cannot Tread, a studio album, that was released by Thumper Punk Records on June 5, 2012.

== Members ==
Current members

- Nic - lead vocals, bass
- Jeff - guitar
- Dave - guitar
- J - drums

== Discography ==
Studio albums

- Where Thieves Cannot Tread (June 5, 2012, Thumper Punk/Punk Roxx)
