= The Wet Spots =

Canadian musical comedy duo

- Origin: Vancouver, British Columbia, Canada
- Genres: Jazz, folk, cabaret, R&B, rock, comedy
- Years active: 2003–present
- Members: Cass King; John Woods
- Website: www.wetspotsmusic.com

The Wet Spots are a Canadian husband and wife musical sex comedy duo fronted by singer Cass King and backup singer and guitarist John Woods.

== History ==
The duo began playing together in 2003 at Vancouver cabarets and comedy clubs. Years later, having gained a following with the success of internet music videos, The Wet Spots began traveling extensively, playing shows across the United States, Canada, the United Kingdom and Australia.

The duo collaborated on the musical Shine: A Burlesque Musical.

As of 2016, the pair continue to perform in the Vancouver area.
