= County Town Singers =

Canadian choral group

The County Town Singers are a Canadian choral group based in Whitby, Ontario. The choir has performed hundreds of concerts in southern Ontario, and has also performed across Canada and internationally,

== History ==
The County Town Singers were founded in 1967 as a project to mark Canada's 100th birthday. The next year, Marg Weber became the group's pianist. An early director was Jim Ashley.

In 1972, the choir recorded an album, County Town Singers, Sing for People.

In 1980 Russell Baird became the director of the choir.

The choir performed at Expo 86 in Vancouver, British Columbia. In 1991 they traveled to Austria to perform in Whitby's twinned town, Feldkirch.

In 2012 the County Town Singers participated in the Rhythms of One World Festival sponsored by the United Nations and performed there with other choirs from around the world.

The choir celebrated its 50th anniversary in 2017 by performing in Ottawa at the National Arts Centre with other Canadian choirs and the orchestra.
