= Sully (band) =

Sully was a Canadian indie pop group, formed in 1994 in Ottawa, Ontario. The original lineup featured of vocalist Becke Gainforth, guitarists Scott Strachan and Glenn Toddun, bassist Kelly Wren and drummer Ian Duke, the band initially pursued a style reminiscent of My Bloody Valentine, blending densely layered, hard-edged shoegazer rock with ethereal vocals in the style of the Cocteau Twins.

The band released a self-titled album independently in 1995, and followed up with I Have Much to Report on Toronto-based independent label Random Sound in 1997. They then signed to Nettwerk Records, which reissued I Have Much to Report in 1998 and included a remixed version of the single "Otherd" on its Plastic Compilation, Vol. 1.

They were dropped from Nettwerk in 2000, following which Toddun and Wren left the band. The remaining members added keyboardist Dan McCormick and bassist Paul Prince, and released their third album Bright Lights in 2001. The new album incorporated more traditional song structures, and mixed Gainforth's vocals higher so that the lyrics could be more easily understood.

A fourth album was planned and announced, but has never been released.
