= Dead Jesus =

Canadian death metal band

- Origin: Edmonton, Alberta, Canada
- Genres: Melodic death metal
- Years active: 1998–2011
- Members: Ignacious Pavol; Calvin Fehr
- Past members: Alex McIntosh; Trevor Loney; Mike Sparks; Saulomen Ward
- Website: deadjesus.net

Dead Jesus was a Canadian melodic death metal band formed in 1998 in Edmonton. The band became known for its controversial live performances, which often involved the throwing of blood and viscera into the audience. The name Dead Jesus was derived from the band's stated belief that organized religion is detrimental to human progress and should be rejected. Dead Jesus played its final show on Easter Sunday in 2011 in Coaldale, Alberta.

== Biography ==
=== When Your Soul Is the Sickness ===
Dead Jesus was formed in 1998 by core members Evil Glen (guitar and vocals), Org666 (vocals), and Lord Bedingfield (bass). Unable to secure a full-time fourth member, the band initially performed without a drummer, often placing an unattended drum kit on stage and encouraging audience members to play along. After several months, Dead Jesus met Alex McIntosh and recorded a four-song demo entitled Mourning. Owing to the band's limited financial resources, the release was restricted to a few hundred cassette copies; however, the recordings circulated through word of mouth, with at least one copy reaching New York City.

In 1999, following the breakup of local band Perceptual Distortion, Dead Jesus replaced McIntosh with drummer Trevor Loney. With the new lineup in place, the band entered Powersound Studios to record its full-length debut album, When Your Soul Is the Sickness. The album featured raw but energetic versions of songs such as "Roadkill", "A.F.", and "Mortuary". Its release led to opening slots for bands including Cannibal Corpse, Incantation, Cryptopsy, and Napalm Death.

=== Let Them Suffer ===
Following the release of When Your Soul Is the Sickness, Loney and Bedingfield departed the band for personal reasons and were replaced by Travisty and Mike Sparks, respectively. A second guitarist, Sol, subsequently joined the lineup. In 2004, Dead Jesus returned to Powersound Studios to record its second album, Let Them Suffer, which featured a more polished sound. The album strengthened the band's local profile and resulted in tour dates across Canada with acts such as Deicide and Infernäl Mäjesty. During this period, Dead Jesus was approached by Nuclear Blast America, which offered a recording contract contingent on a change of the band's name; the band declined.

=== More Funerals ===
In 2007, Lord Bedingfield rejoined Dead Jesus amid ongoing internal tensions within the band. Despite these challenges, new material was written, and the band returned to Powersound Studios with Bedingfield on bass. The resulting release, More Funerals, was a four-song EP packaged with a short documentary edited by Drew Copeland (Death Toll Rising). The documentary includes appearances by former members and provides a record of the band during this transitional period.

=== God and the Devil ===
Following More Funerals, Dead Jesus embarked on its most ambitious project to date. During a hiatus, Lord Bedingfield wrote a novel that he intended to publish independently, but financial constraints prevented its release. After discussions with Evil Glen, the band decided to integrate the novel with its next musical release, with the album's themes reflecting the narrative of the book. The scope of the project required additional material and personnel, leading to the recruitment of Blagerbaas (lead guitar) and Father Twelve (drums).

In September 2008, Dead Jesus released God and the Devil, a double-disc album presented in a hardcover format that included the complete text of Bedingfield's novel. The release show took place at Edmonton's Starlite Room and featured theatrical elements as part of the performance.

At the time of writing, plans were being developed to tour in Europe and South America.

== Discography ==
- 1999: Into Mourning (four-song demo)
- 2000: When Your Soul Is the Sickness (full-length debut)
- 2004: Let Them Suffer (full-length CD)
- 2007: More Funerals (four-song EP with DVD)
- 2008: God and the Devil (double-disc release with accompanying novel)
- 2009: Let Them Suffer (remixed and remastered version)

== Band members ==
=== Last-known lineup ===
- Calvin Fehr – lead vocals
- Daemonikus – vocals
- Evilglen Botchenstein – rhythm guitar, vocals
- Blagerbaas – lead guitar
- Lord Bedingfield IV – bass
- Father Twelve – drums

=== Former members ===
- Org666 – vocals
- Alex McIntosh – drums (Into Mourning)
- Trevor Loney – drums (When Your Soul Is the Sickness)
- Mike Sparks – bass (Let Them Suffer)
- Saulomen Ward – lead guitar (Let Them Suffer, More Funerals)
- Travisty – drums (Let Them Suffer, More Funerals)
