= Vacuity (band) =

Canadian rock band

- Origin: Kitchener, Ontario, Canada
- Genres: Indie rock
- Years active: 2004–2013
- Past members: Rob McFee; Paul McGough; Greg Osborn; Emeri Schweigert
- Website: vacuity.net

Vacuity were a Canadian indie rock band from Kitchener. Vacuity's albums include The Middle Ground, released in 2004, and 2006's Come On Get Real. The band released its 2008 album, At the Command of a Blanket Sky on CD, USB Drive, and as a free download via their website, and released the song "The 5th of November" as a single. According to some critics, the band's sound is similar to that of Radiohead.

Band members included Rob McFee on guitar and vocals, Paul McGough on bass, Greg Osborn on guitar, and Emeri Schweigert on drums.

In 2006, Vacuity played the North by Northeast festival, and in 2008–09 the band toured Canada in support of At the Command of a Blanket Sky. Vacuity disbanded in January 2013.
