= Mark Spicoluk =

Canadian musician

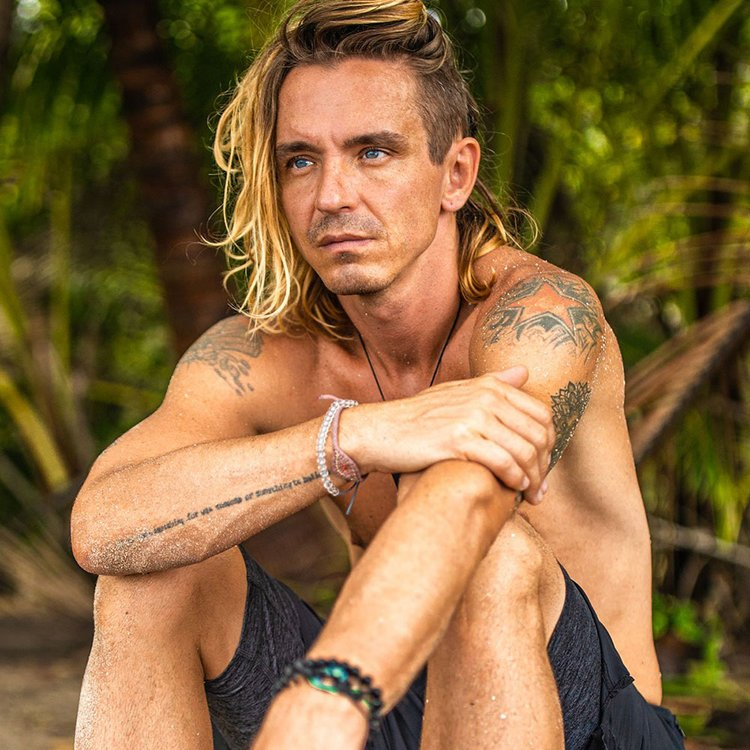
- Spicoluk in 2023

Background information
- Also known as: London
- Origin: Edmonton, Alberta, Canada
- Genres: Punk rock; pop-punk; anarcho-punk; alternative rock; pop rock
- Occupations: Musician; producer; A&R; artist manager
- Instruments: Bass guitar; vocals
- Years active: 1994–present
- Label: Underground Operations
- Formerly of: Closet Monster; Avril Lavigne; Sum 41
- Partner: Juliana Spicoluk (née Semenova)
- Website: markspicoluk.com

Mark Spicoluk is a Canadian content creator, yoga instructor, musician, podcaster, and entrepreneur. He is best known as co-creator and yoga teacher for the lifestyle brand Boho Beautiful, his time as bass player with Avril Lavigne, and as the vocalist and bassist for the punk rock band Closet Monster. From 2012 to 2015 he appeared as a judge on YTV's The Next Star. He is also known as the founder of the indie record label Underground Operations, and his production credits on albums by artists such as Protest the Hero, Abandon All Ships, Stereos and DVBBS. Along with his musical and business accomplishments, he is also a strong animal rights and social justice advocate.

== Boho Beautiful ==
Boho Beautiful

YouTube information
- Years active: 2014–present
- Genres: Travel; Yoga; Fitness; Wellness
- Subscribers: 2.69 million (Boho Beautiful Yoga); 91.1 thousand (Boho Beautiful Life)
- Views: 401 million (Boho Beautiful Yoga); 1.3 million (Boho Beautiful Life)
- Website: www.bohobeautiful.life

In 2014, Mark and Juliana Spicoluk (née Semenova, born May 16, 1990 in Siberia Russia, raised in Ukraine) started a YouTube channel known as Boho Beautiful, when Mark became injured while snowboarding and decided to take up yoga for his recovery. The channel has content that focuses on the tranquility of the mind and body. Topics include yoga, fitness, pilates, guided meditation, a vegan diet, and self-awareness.

Boho Beautiful held a tour in 2017, during which the Spicoluks taught yoga classes and met with the channel's community across North America. In 2017, Mark and Juliana Spicoluk also published their first book, The Happy Healthy Plant-Based Eating Guide. In 2020, Boho Beautiful published its second book.

Boho Beautiful also has content about veganism and meditation topics.

Boho Beautiful had over 2 million subscribers on YouTube and was the third-most followed channel in the yoga category. Their videos have been mentioned in Prevention magazine, Vogue Australia, Cosmopolitan, The South African, Men's Journal, Shape Magazine, and AsiaOne.

== Stars+Destruct. podcast ==
Spicoluk is currently the co-host of the podcast stars+destruct. with his wife Juliana Spicoluk. The podcast has a 4.9 out of 5 rating from over 4000 listeners on Spotify, and has had guests such as Teal Swan, Chris Williamson, actor Adrien Grenier, Ricki Lake, Vandana Shiva, Aubrey Marcus, Mei-Lan, film-maker Kip Anderson, & Shunyamurti.

== Music career ==
Spicoluk briefly filled in as a bassist for Sum 41 in 1998, until he was replaced by Jason "Cone" McCaslin in 1999. Spicoluk founded and played bass for the band Closet Monster from 1997 until their last show in December 2005, and established the indie punk rock label Underground Operations in 1995. In the winter of 2002 Spicoluk began playing bass for Avril Lavigne and helped prepare the launch of her first album "Let Go." From 2007 until 2012 he was an A&R Representative, eventually becoming Head of A&R for Universal Music Canada as well as a personal A&R for Gene Simmons at Simmons Records. He has production credits on albums by Protest the Hero, Abandon All Ships and many others. Most recently Spicoluk has co-founded a new entertainment business service company called Cloud Empire.

=== Early bands ===
Spicoluk sang and played lead guitar in his first band, Public Display, formed with high school friends in 1995 under the name Special Ed. The band played shows all over Ontario, releasing a self-titled CD in 1996.

=== Closet Monster ===
Spicoluk was the bassist and vocalist for the political punk band Closet Monster during its entire existence from 1997 to 2005. Over the course of 7 albums and countless tours of North America and Europe, Spicoluk also co-wrote every song and co-produced every release. Closet Monster's lyrics focused on political and social issues such as human rights violations, gender equality, anti-capitalism, and strongly supported animal rights. The band reunited for one show in 2009 at Wakestock festival in Wasaga Beach, Ontario.

=== Avril Lavigne ===
Early in 2002, Spicoluk was hired to play bass in Avril Lavigne's band as well as help prepare the launch of her first album, Let Go. Appearing on TV shows such as Good Morning America, The Tonight Show with Jay Leno, Live with Regis and Kelly, The Late Late Show with Craig Kilborn, and in stadiums all around the world. He was also featured in the videos for the songs "Complicated" and "Sk8er Boi". Spicoluk later left the band to focus on Closet Monster and Underground Operations.

=== Underground Operations ===
Spicoluk founded Underground Operations to put out releases by his own bands, in hopes that one day they could also release other bands they knew. Originally called Underground Monkey Operations, the label released albums by Public Display and Closet Monster before becoming Underground Operations in 2002. Originally releasing albums by Toronto bands Hostage Life, Bombs Over Providence, and Marilyn's Vitamins, as well as the first of many records by Protest the Hero. By 2007 the label had released albums by The Brat Attack, Dead Letter Dept., I Hate Sally, and These Silhouettes. The next few years saw a change in sound for the label, releasing music by Aspirations, acoustic act Machete Avenue and the Juno-winning first album by Lights. In the next few years the label released albums including Means, Kingdoms and Kathleen Turner Overdrive as well as the much loved The Holly Springs Disaster. Today the label is home to Abandon All Ships, Rob Moir, Diemonds, Skynet and Hands and Teeth. Spicoluk serves as the President/Founder.

=== Universal Music Canada ===
In 2007, Spicoluk became an A&R representative at Universal Music Canada. Eventually he became Head of A&R, overseeing the entire domestic roster, including Drake, The Tragically Hip, Down With Webster, and Hey Ocean!. During his time at Universal, Spicoluk also worked as a personal A&R for Gene Simmons, signing bands Kobra and the Lotus and The Envy to his label Simmons Records.

== Cloud Empire ==
In 2013, Spicoluk partnered with artist manager Dan Hand to create Cloud Empire, a business collective. specializing in music, entertainment, and business services.

== Television work ==
Spicoluk appeared for two seasons on MuchMusic's reality show Disband from 2009 to 2011, and then judged on YTV's The Next Star for its last three seasons.

Spicoluk appeared for two seasons as a panelist on the Muchmusic reality show Disband. Discovering the band Stereos on the show, Spicoluk went on to manage and develop the band into one of 2011's most successful new Canadian artists. In 2012 Spicoluk became a judge on YTV's The Next Star, a youth-oriented singing competition along with singers Tara Oram and Keshia Chanté. In 2014, Chanté was replaced by Dan Kanter. Spicoluk also appears on the web show From Far And Wide, which crosses Canada documenting homegrown music.

== Activism and charity work ==
Spicoluk is a vegan, and has publicly supported and worked with several animals rights groups in Toronto, including Toronto Pig Save, Peta2 and Mercy for Animals. He has also appeared in a public service announcement for Finding Fido, and has hosted parties for Fuck Cancer, a Montreal-based organization devoted to cancer research.

== Closet Monster discography ==
- So Be It - 1997
- Pure Unfiltered Anarchy - 1998
- A Fight For What Is Right - 1999
- Where The Fuck Is Revolution? - 2000
- Killed The Radio Star - 2002
- We Rebuilt This City - 2004

== Studio production credits ==
- Closet Monster – Killed the Radio Star – 2003 – producer/performance
- Protest the Hero – Search for the Truth – 2003 – producer
- Closet Monster – Re-built This City – 2005 – producer/performer
- Protest the Hero – Kezia – 2006 – executive producer
- The Brat Attack – 2006 – producer
- Chad Michael Stewart – Machete Avenue – 2008 – executive producer
- Protest the Hero – Fortress − 2008 – executive producer
- These Silhouettes – Thomas EP – 2008 – producer
- Stereos – Stereos – 2009 – executive producer/guest performer/composer
- Abandon All Ships – Geeving – 2010 – composer, producer
- Stereos – Stereos – Uncontrollable – 2010 – composer, executive producer
- The Artist Life – Impossible – 2011 – composer
- Abandon All Ships – Infamous – 2012 – producer
- DVBBS – Initio EP – 2012 – composer, producer
- Protest the Hero – A Calculated Use of Sound – producer

== Music video appearances ==
- Closet Monster – Mr. Holland vs. Acceptable Behaviour – Performer
- Closet Monster – Corporate Media Death Squad – Performer
- Avril Lavigne – Complicated – Performer
- Avril Lavigne – Sk8er Boi – Performer
- Protest the Hero – These Colours Don't Run – Cameo
- Alexisonfire – Waterwings (And Other Poolside Fashion Faux Pas)
- Closet Monster – Mamma Anti-Fascisto – Performer
- The Brat Attack – Mr. Capitalist – Cameo
- Closet Monster – Punk Rock Ruined My Life – Performer
- Hostage Life – This Song Was Written by a Committee – Cameo
- Protest the Hero – Palms Read – Feature
- Lights – Drive My Soul – Role- The Spaceman
- Stereos – Summer Girl – Cameo
- Jhevon Paris – She Got Me – Cameo
- Stereos – She Only Likes Me When She's Drunk – Cameo
- Abandon All Ships – Geeving – Cameo

== Underground Operations roster history ==
- Marilyn's Vitamins
- Protest the Hero
- Closet Monster
- Bombs Over Providence
- Dead Letter Dept.
- Hostage Life
- I Hate Sally
- The Brat Attack
- These Silhouettes
- Aspirations
- Kathleen Turner Overdrive
- Means
- The Holly Springs Disaster
- Lights
- Machete Avenue
- Chad Michael Stewart
- The Artist Life
- Dean Lickyer
- Sam Bradley
- Kingdoms
- Abandon All Ships
- Diemonds
- Rob Moir
- Skynet
- Hands and Teeth
- Victory, Sweet Victory!
