= Closet Monster (band) =

Canadian punk rock band

- Origin: Ajax, Ontario, Canada
- Genres: Pop-punk; punk rock; anarcho-punk
- Years active: 1997–2005; 2009
- Label: Underground Operations
- Past members: Mark "London" Spicoluk; Jesse Colburn; Adam Cyncora; Aaron Verdonk
- Website: Official Myspace

Closet Monster was a Canadian punk rock band from Ajax, Ontario.

== Biography ==
Closet Monster was formed at Pickering High School in 1997 primarily by Mark Spicoluk, the sole founder of Underground Operations record label along with Jesse Colburn, noted for having performed in Avril Lavigne's band from 2002-2004 of the Let Go album era with Spicoluk first performing in Public Display, from 1995–1997 (originally; Special Ed) then with Sum 41 briefly in 1997. The band's lyrics are noted for having an anarchist theme, primarily meant to be tongue in cheek, albeit it can be perceived to be glamorizing and promoting it.

Closet Monster has achieved publicity from touring Canada, the United States and Europe, playing dates on the Warped Tour, and starting a successful Canadian record label, Underground Operations. Closet Monster have performed alongside Billy Talent, Rise Against, Alexisonfire, Propagandhi, Hot Water Music, SNFU, Madball, Atom And His Package, Suicidal Tendencies, KNUT, Dead Kennedys, Silverstein, 25tolife, The Suicide Machines, Buck-O-Nine, The Casualties, Choke, Mad Caddies, D.b.s., Mastodon, Atreyu, Ten Foot Pole, Moneen, Protest the Hero, The Movielife, Social Distortion, Bad Religion Warped Tour 2004 & 2005 and many other bands.

The most recent lineup played their final show on December 8, 2005, at the Phoenix in Toronto with Underground Operations label mates Dead Letter Dept, Bombs Over Providence, Hostage Life, and Protest The Hero. The band reunited in 2009 for one show at Wakestock Festival.

Before shutting down in 2016, Underground Operations released Suicide Note, an anthological compilation album of Closet Monster's work, as their last release.

== Band members ==
=== Final lineup ===
- Mark "London" Spicoluk – bass guitar
- Jesse Colburn – guitar
- Adam Cyncora – guitar
- Aaron Verdonk – drums

=== Former ===
- Brandon Hilbiorn "b-unit" – guitar, vocals
- Christopher McCartney – drums
- Kyle Gordon Stanley – drums
- Mark McAdam "MC" – guitar
- Jon Marshall "Rudy" – guitar, vocals
- Matt 'The Ween' Murphy – guitar

== Discography ==
=== Studio albums ===
- So Be It (1997)
- Pure Unfiltered Anarchy (1998)
- A Fight For What Is Right (1999)
- Where The Fuck Is Revolution? (2000)
- Killed The Radio Star (2002)
- We Re-Built This City (2004)

=== Singles ===
Year	Song	Album
2004	Mamma Anti-Fascisto: (Never Surrender)	We Rebuilt This City
2005	Punk Rock Ruined Our Lives	We Rebuilt This City

=== Compilation albums ===
- Suicide Note - 2016

== Music videos ==
- "Mr. Holland Vs. Acceptable Behaviour" (2002)
- "Corporate Media Death Squad" (2003)
- "Mamma Anti-Fascisto: Never Surrender" (2004)
- "Punk Rock Ruined Our Lives" (2005)
