= Marilyn's Vitamins =

- Origin: Orangeville, Ontario, Canada
- Genres: Punk, anarcho-punk, pop punk
- Years active: 1995–2000
- Labels: Underground Operations, Raw Energy, Ductape Records, Ugly Pop Records
- Past members: Rob Moir; Danny Complex; Colin Lichti; Adam Cook; Shawn Dickey; Jeff Breen; Chris "Wooder" Wood
- Website: http://www.myspace.com/marilynsvitamins

Marilyn's Vitamins was a Canadian punk rock band formed in 1995 from Orangeville, Ontario, Canada, playing their last show December 28, 1999, in Toronto, Ontario. In those near-five years they released two albums on Raw Energy and 7"s on Ductape, and Ugly Pop Vinyl. A posthumous collection was released on Underground Operations in 2003. The band consisted of Rob Moir (guitar), Danny Complex (guitar/vocals), Colin Lichti (vocals), Adam Cook (bass/vocals), Jeff Breen (guitar), Kristoffer Wood (bass), and Shawn Dickey (drums). Members of the band went on to form Bombs Over Providence, Hostage Life, and Dead Letter Dept. Their lyrics mainly dealt with various political issues of the time.

== Band members ==
- Jeff Breen (AKA "Jeff Obnoxious")
- Dan Christopher (AKA "Danny Complex")
- Adam Cook (AKA "Adam Purile")
- Shawn Dickey (AKA "Dick Teenager")
- Colin Lichti (AKA "Colin Vitamin", Colin Ridiculouspunkpseudonym)
- Rob Moir (AKA Rob Stiff, Rob Potential)
- Kris Wood (AKA "Wooder")

== Discography ==
- 1995: Self Titled (demo)
- 1995: Down and Out In Levittown (demo)
- 1996: In These Shoes (Raw Energy)
- 1997: Squeegee Girl 7" (Ductape Records)
- 1998: Politics On The Dance Floor (Raw Energy)
- 1999: Meanwhile, During the Class War 7" (Ugly Pop Records)

=== Compilations ===
- 2002: (coles) Notes From The Underground (Underground Operations)
- 2003: Vans Don't Run On Love And Records Aren't Pressed With Smiles (Underground Operations)

== See also ==
- Music of Canada
- Canadian rock
- List of Canadian musicians
- List of bands from Canada
- Category:Canadian musical groups
