= Jesse Colburn =

Canadian guitarist

- Born: Jesse Timothy Colburn; May 5, 1981 (age 45); Ajax, Ontario, Canada
- Origin: Toronto, Ontario
- Genres: Punk; pop punk
- Instrument: Guitar
- Label: Underground Operations
- Formerly of: Closet Monster

Jesse Colburn (born May 5, 1981) is a Canadian guitarist. He played guitar for Closet Monster, until their final show on December 8, 2005, and previously played in Avril Lavigne's band from 2002 to 2004.

== Personal life ==
Jesse Adam Timothy Colburn attended Pickering High School in Ajax, Ontario, where he formed Closet Monster in 1997.

He worked with Avril Lavigne's band from 2002 to 2004, leaving the band before they started their 2004 tour.

He has also worked on a side project called "Evil Robot Usses", with former Closet Monster bandmate and Stereos drummer Aaron Verdonk.

== Television appearances ==
Colburn has appeared in several television shows, and a movie, with Lavigne, including Sabrina, the Teenage Witch, The View, Going the Distance and the 2002 MTV Video Awards. He has also appeared in the documentary "My World".

Jesse also appeared as a songwriter and producer in a number of episodes of Much Music's Disband Season 2.

== Current ==
Colburn is a songwriter and producer based in Toronto, Ontario. He has worked with the band Stereos co-writing such songs as Throw Ya Hands Up and Turn It Up off of their self-titled debut album, and has recently completed writing and production work on The Artist Life's upcoming album. He has also composed the theme song to The ZhuZhus with Aaron Verdonk.
