= Sarnia Bayfest =

Annual music festival

Coordinates: 42°58′49″N 82°24′20″W

Rogers Sarnia Bayfest was an annual music festival held in Centennial Park in Sarnia, Ontario, Canada, each July, from 1999 to 2012. At its end, the event was attracting approximately 100,000 visitors.

As of 2007, Bayfest was run by Bayfest Festival of Performing Arts; a non-profit charitable organization, which involved and benefited a number of charities. Bayfest Festival of Performing Arts donated hundreds of thousands of dollars to local non-profit organizations. Bayfest also had two scholarship programs for Sarnia-Lambton County students. The first was The Jim Stokley Scholarship which was founded after the passing of Jim Stokley (co-founder of Bayfest); the second was a Bayfest/Metalworks Institute scholarship. Two Jim Stokley Scholarships and one Bayfest/Metalworks Institute scholarship were given out annually.

For 2009, 2010 and 2011, Bayfest split into two weekends in July: Rock acts played on the 2nd weekend, and Country on the 3rd weekend. The festival won numerous awards, including the Ontario Tourism's Best Business/Event of the year award in 2009, and Festival and Events Ontario's Festival of Distinction award, which is a Lifetime Achievement award.

On February 25, 2013, the Sarnia Bayfest announced it was taking an indefinite hiatus as a result of high debt, increasing costs and stagnant sponsorships.

== Performers ==
1999 – Amanda Marshall, April Wine, Prairie Oyster, Sloan, Whiskey River Band, Alannah Myles, Bachman-Turner Overdrive, Sass Jordan

2000 – 9 House, Big Wreck, David Wilcox, Kim Mitchell, Loverboy, Matthew Good Band, Moist

2001 – 9 House, Flicker, Collective Soul, Everclear, George Thorogood, Staggered Crossing, Tom Cochrane, Treble Charger, Wide Mouth Mason

2002 – 9 House, Flicker, The Guess Who, The Headstones, Nickelback, Our Lady Peace, Sloan, The Tragically Hip, The Watchmen

2003 – Barenaked Ladies, Barlow, Blink-182, Cheap Trick, Foo Fighters, Getaway, MYMACHINE, Matthew Good, Sum 41, Pete Yorn

2004 – Bryan Adams, Colin James, Death of 8, Finger Eleven, The Spades, The Tragically Hip, ZZ Top

2005 – 3 Doors Down, Alter Bridge, Amanda Stott, Billy Talent, David Lee Roth, Flyleaf, High Holy Days, Jody Raffoul, Kalan Porter, Kid Rock, No Address, Staind

2006 – Flatlined, Astronaut, Brooks and Dunn, Buckcherry, Collective Soul, Everclear, Gretchen Wilson, Keith Urban, Scott Manery & The Barnburners

2007 – Aerosmith, Def Leppard, Faber Drive, Hedley, Nickelback, Scott Manery & The Barnburners, Toby Keith

2008 – The Black Crowes, Big & Rich ft. Cowboy Troy, Bon Jovi, Crash Kelly, Crystal Gage, Daphne Darling, Death Of 8, Down With Webster, Emerson Drive, Face to Face, Fergie, Low Level Flight, Mötley Crüe, Rascal Flatts, Revolver, Scarlet Sins, See Spot Run, Saidat, Stone River, Scott Manery & The Barnburners

2009 – Rock Weekend: Bobnoxious, Counting Crows, Dean Lickyer, Frankie Whyte & the Dead Idols, Kiss, Metro4, Our Lady Peace, Running Red Lights, See Spot Run, Stone Temple Pilots, The Trews. Country Weekend: Brad Paisley, Deric Ruttan, Doc Walker, Jason Blaine, Shelly Rastin, Tim McGraw.

2010 – Rock Weekend: The Action Figures, Art of Fresh, Bobnoxious, Cinderella, Crash Karma, Hello Bella, Rush, Sam Roberts, Scorpions, Vân Scott, Weezer. Country Weekend: Aaron Lines, Alan Jackson, CrowJane, Dean Brody, Keith Urban, Marshall Dane, The Road Hammers, Scott Manery & The Barnburners, Shane Yellowbird, Whiskey River Band. Additional Show: The Black Eyed Peas, Down with Webster, Wild Domestic

2011 – Rock Weekend: The 88, Affinity, The Arkells, Crunge, The Envy, George Thorogood and the Destroyers, Inambush, INXS, Joel Plaskett, Kiss, Low Level Flight, Marianas Trench, Steve Miller Band, The Tea Party, Theory of a Deadman, To Tell, Tokyo Police Club, The Tragically Hip, The Trews, Sound of Fans. Country Weekend: Aaron Pritchett, Dry County, George Canyon, Lady Antebellum, Montgomery Gentry, Rodney Atkins, Scott Manery & The Barnburners, Trace Adkins

2012 – Alice Cooper, Big Wreck, Bleeker, Brantley Gilbert, Coheed and Cambria, Cowboy Junkies, Emerson Drive, Frank Deresti and the Lake Effect, Hedley, Iron Maiden, John Mellencamp, The Offspring, Papa Roach, The Sheepdogs, Simple Plan, Toby Keith, Ubiquitous Synergy Seeker
