= Disband (TV series) =

- Starring: Greig Nori
- Country of origin: Canada
- No. of seasons: 2
- No. of episodes: 29

Production
- Running time: 30-60 mins

Original release
- Network: MuchMusic (2008)
- Release: 2008 – 2010

Disband (stylized as disBand) is a Canadian reality show that was produced and broadcast by MuchMusic that arranged and permitted aspiring music acts an opportunity to garner professional A&R industry attention and achieve a recording contract. It was hosted by Sarah Taylor and Devon Soltendieck and was usually narrated by the lead singer of the featured band.

== Overview ==
Each episode featured a band that was coached by a music industry veteran and at the end performed for a panel of judges. Greig Nori "The Guru" had made appearances as an adviser, and Ralph James, Jennifer Hirst, Colin Lewis, JDiggz, Hannah Simone, Mark Spicoluk, Katie Clark, and Matt Wells had appeared as judges.

Each episode was in 7 different segments, for each day of the week leading up until Sunday, their performance day at MuchMusic Headquarters. The segments followed what the band experiences on each day, starting on Sunday. At the beginning of the episode, the band was introduced along with all of its members. The episode was usually narrated by the lead singer, although other members had done so as well.

In most cases, Greig would surprise them and arrange for them to meet up, where he would then begin coaching them. The bands would then take part in various activities such as photo shoots, meeting record labels, interviews, or writing new songs, throughout the week. Most episodes also featured the band visiting a local Toronto recording studio, such as Number 9 Audio Group or The Decibel House, for a recording session with a professional engineer. By the end of the week, they would have to perform amongst a panel of judges and an audience.

After their performance, they would head into a green room where Greig would be waiting for them. Back in the main room, the judges would deliberate and decide whether or not the band had a possibility of getting signed. However, the decision was not affected by the audience's wishes. The band would then go back into the main room, where the host would then summarize the judges' thoughts, mentioning both pros and cons of the band. After the verdict, the episode ended with the band either going back home, or got ready to take on a next step.

== Episodes ==
Season One

Episode	Band	Band Members	Hometown	Fate
1	The Homecoming	Quinn Danielis - Vocals / Guitar; Chris Thaung - Bass / Vocals; Damien Stillwell - Guitar / Vocals; Dale Doiron - Guitar / Vocals; Nathan Wallace - Drums	Scarborough, Toronto, Ontario	Thumbs Down
2	Trick Of Disaster	Rafe Malach - Vocals / Guitar; Dave Henriques - Bass / Synths / Guitar; Rich So - Drums	Toronto, Ontario	Thumbs Down
3	Soul Plane	Yui – Emcee, Mel G – Vocals; Gideon Litvin – Lead Guitar; Kevin Nanni – Rhythm Guitar; Aaron Mellet – Drums	Toronto, Ontario	Thumbs Down
4	Calicose	Alana - Vocals; Stu - Bass; Jeff - Drums; Keir - Guitar		Thumbs Up
5	Times	Alexander J. Yolevski - Vocals / Keyboard; Paul Doherty - Guitar; Adam Dwyer - Bass; Matthew Winkler - Drums	Toronto, Ontario	Thumbs Down
6	Cookie Couture	Fran-Kay - Rapper; Elisa - Vocals; Kitana - Rapper; Stacey - Vocals; J.Beautiful - Vocals	Thornhill, Ontario	Thumbs Up
7	KaraMel	Kara - Lead Vocals; Mel - Piano/Keyboard/Harmonies	Toronto, Ontario	Thumbs Down
8	Fancy Girls Market	Keith - Vocals; Justin - Lead Guitar; Mike - Rhythm Guitar; Izzy - Drums; Steph - Bass	Toronto, Ontario	Thumbs Down
9	The Isosceles Project	Eric - Guitar; Scott - Bass; Justin - Drums	Toronto, Ontario	Thumbs Down
10	Dean Lickyer	Joshua Alvernia - Vocals; Eric Martin - Drums; Justin Bosso - Bass; Sean Royle - Guitar	Hamilton, Ontario	Thumbs Up & signed to Underground Operations
11	Futures Past	Basel Ricky - Vocals; Jason Hoeg - Guitar; Alex Bruce - Guitar; Garth Julien - Bass; Martin Wigle - Drums	Toronto, Ontario	Thumbs Up
12	Katie & Lisa	Katie - Vocals; Lisa - Guitar		Thumbs Down
13	sateLites	Theo Vigo - Vocals/Guitar; Arthur Sollano - Guitar/Vocals; Allen Pinlac - Drums	Toronto, Ontario	Thumbs Down
14	Songbird	Sacha; Tasha	London, Ontario	Thumbs Down
15	Chasing Amee	Steve Hall - Vocals/Guitar; Ryan Faist - Guitar/Keys; Tuck - Bass; Nathan Bulla - Drums	Cambridge, Ontario	Thumbs Up
16	Credible Witness	Walter - Vocals/Piano; Michael - Guitar/Vocals; Ryan - Drums; Matt - Bass	Windsor, Ontario	Thumbs Down
17	Hasket	Joe - Vocals; Mikey - Guitar; Ryley - Guitar; Matt - Bass; Dillon - Drums		Thumbs Down
18	Dog Bus	"Jules MKools" "Jakey MkSpankey"	Toronto, Ontario	Thumbs Up
19	Space Is For Stars	Ryan - Vocals/Guitar; Brian - Guitar; Gary - Drums; Brayden - Bass		Thumbs Up
20	Stereos	Pat K - Vocals; Robby "The Queer" C - Guitar; Daniel - Bass; Miles Holmwood - Guitar; Brad Bosch - Drums	Edmonton, Alberta	Appeared as Turn It Up on the show. Thumbs Up & signed to Universal Music Canada

Season Two

Episode	Band	Band Members	Hometown	Fate	Song
1	Mean Tangerine	Max Off - Vocals / Guitar; Brent Weber - Guitar; Jesse Wilks - Bass; Mike Carrey - Drums	London, Ontario	Thumbs Down, Now Signed To Drive Records/Fontana North	Change
2	Syla Vale	Sylvia Nguyen - Vocals / Guitar; Brayden Clark -Drums	Brampton, Ontario	Thumbs Down	Let It Go
3	Street Pharmacy	Ryan Guay - Vocals / Guitar; Adam Webster - Lead Guitar; Nate Triano - Rhythm Guitar; Brandon Ventresca - Bass; Dan Fretz - Drums	Welland, Ontario	Thumbs Up and Signed to Fontana North	Stone, Bricks And Mortar
4	Alex Galli	Alex Galli - Vocals / Guitar; Kyle Merkley - Bass	Toronto, Ontario	Thumbs Down	Truce
5	Maddy Rodriguez	Maddy Rodriguez - Vocals/Guitar; Johnny Simmen - Cajon/Harmonies; Kyle Sipress - Guitar; Matt Wilson - Guitar; Dan Sadowski - Bass	Toronto, Ontario	Split Decision (Thumbs Up)	Break Down
6	The Stiff Wires (Now All The Trendy Kids)	Danny - Lead Vocals, Bass; Brandyn - Guitar, Vocals; Jamie - Guitar, Vocals; Jesse - Drums	London, Ontario	Thumbs Down, Now Signed with Brightside Records	Song Of The Same Name
7	Abandon All Ships	Ange - Vocals; Kyler - Guitar; Martin - Drums & Vocals; Andrew - Guitar; Seb - Synth; Francesco - Bass	Toronto, Ontario	Thumbs Up & Signed to Underground Operations, Rise Records and Velocity Records	Megawacko
8	Em	Em - Vocals		Thumbs Down	Kickin' It Down
9	Good & Broken	Marissa - Vocals; Jared - Guitar, Bass, Drums		Thumbs Up	My Mistakes
10	San Sebastian	Brodie Dawson - Guitar; Greg Veerman - Bass; Mike Veerman - Vocals; Sean Dawson - Guitar; Ted Paterson - Drums	Hamilton, Ontario	Appeared as Pumps on the show. Thumbs Up & Signed to Universal Music Canada	Wake Up
11	The Word Tonight	Scott - Vocals; Erik - Guitar; Kai - Guitar; Nickk - Drums; Dylan - Bass Mylo - Keyboard (kicked out of the band during episode)	Ottawa, Ontario	Thumbs Down	Smile For The Camera
12	Reverse	Dizz - Vocals; Khadjia - Vocals; Taylor Evans - Vocals	Toronto, Ontario	Thumbs Down	Over U
13	These Kids Wear Crowns	Alex Johnson - Vocals; Alan Poettcker - Bass/Vocals; Joe Porter - Guitar; Josh Mitchinson - Drums; Matt Vink - Keyboard; Josh "Gypsy" McDaniel - Guitar	Chilliwack, British Columbia	Thumbs Up & Signed to Capitol Records/EMI	Break It Up

== DisBand Successes ==
- Stereos - Signed to Universal Music Canada & # 1 Song on iTunes (Summer Girl)
- Dean Lickyer - Signed to Underground Operations
- Abandon All Ships - Signed to Underground Operations, Rise Records and Velocity Records
- San Sebastian - Signed to Universal Music Canada
- These Kids Wear Crowns - Signed to EMI Music Canada / Capitol Records
- Maddy Rodriguez - Nettwerk One Publishing
- Mean Tangerine - Signed To Drive Records/Fontana North

== Spin off ==
A spin-off series, entitled disBand Discovered began in 2011. The series premiered on August 16, 2011. The series follows six bands trying to make it in the industry, over the course of 6 months. MuchMusic has described the series as a "rock documentary". The show features six bands; Nightbox, Colorsound, For The Weekend, Brighter Brightest, Brett Boivin, Maddy Rodriguez and Slow Motion Victory. At the end of the season, the six bands go to Showcase Day at the MuchMusic Headquarters, where they are judged by several record producers serving as judges. The series is still hosted by Greig Nori.

The first season of the series began on August 16, 2011, and finished on October 28, 2011, and aired for a total of 10 episodes.

After the series, For The Weekend released a single called Rockstar and fired one of their members. Slow Motion Victory released an EP "The War Inside", collaborated with Coca-Cola to write a song for their Open Happiness campaign, and are still making music. Nightbox was signed, and is currently on tour, and are going to be an opening act for Lights on tour. Brett Boivin graduated from high school and released an EP. Colorsound was also signed, and is currently working on their second album, while Brighter Brightest released their debut album, Right For Me.
