= Zegarac =

Zegarac or Žegarac (Serbian Cyrillic: Жегарац) is a Slavic surname. Notable people with the surname include:

- Dave Zegarac (born 1979), Canadian punk rock musician
- Dušica Žegarac (1944–2019), Serbian film and television actress
