= At the Mercy of Inspiration =

Canadian heavy metal band

- Origin: Toronto, Ontario, Canada
- Genres: Black metal, heavy metal, metalcore, melodic death metal
- Years active: 2000–2004
- Spinoffs: Cancer Bats
- Past members: Tom Piraino; Jett Janczak; Andre Zadorozny; Greg Gallagher; Scott Middleton; Terry Clemente; Chuck Leach; Jesse O'Hara; Mario Bozza
- Website: www.myspace.com/atthemercyofinspiration

At the Mercy of Inspiration was a heavy metal band from Toronto.

== History ==
At the Mercy of Inspiration was formed in 2000 by Tom Piraino (bass), Jett Janczak (drums), vocalist Andre Zadorozny and guitarists Greg Gallagher and Scott Middleton. Piraino had previously played in Left Behind, SeventyEightDays, Dropping Bombs and Funerary. On December 27, 2000, they recorded a two-song demo cassette, Twolovesongsfortheroad. On May 11, 2001, they recorded a second two-song demo, The Fatality of Beauty.

Gallagher and Piraino then left the band; Piraino went on to join the band Cursed. Bassist Terry Clemente then joined. Gallagher was replaced by guitarist Jesse O'Hara. Clemente then left and was replaced by bassist Mario Bozza. In 2002, they released the seven-song EP A Perfect Way to Kill an Evening.

The band played live in Ontario and Quebec with The End and A Day and a Deathwish, and toured eastern Canada with Alexisonfire, Hollow and Jersey. In 2004, Bozza was replaced by former Jude the Obscure bassist Chuck Leach. They released the four-song EP Gone Are the Days.

In late 2004, the band broke up. Scott Middleton then founded the band Cancer Bats. Leach would later join The Artist Life, while O'Hara played in the band Sun Satellite.

== Releases ==
- 2000: Twolovesongsfortheroad (2-song demo cassette)
- 2001: The Fatality of Beauty (2-song demo cassette)
- 2002: A Perfect Way to Kill an Evening (EP)
- 2004: Gone Are the Days (EP)
