= The Flatliners =

Canadian punk rock band

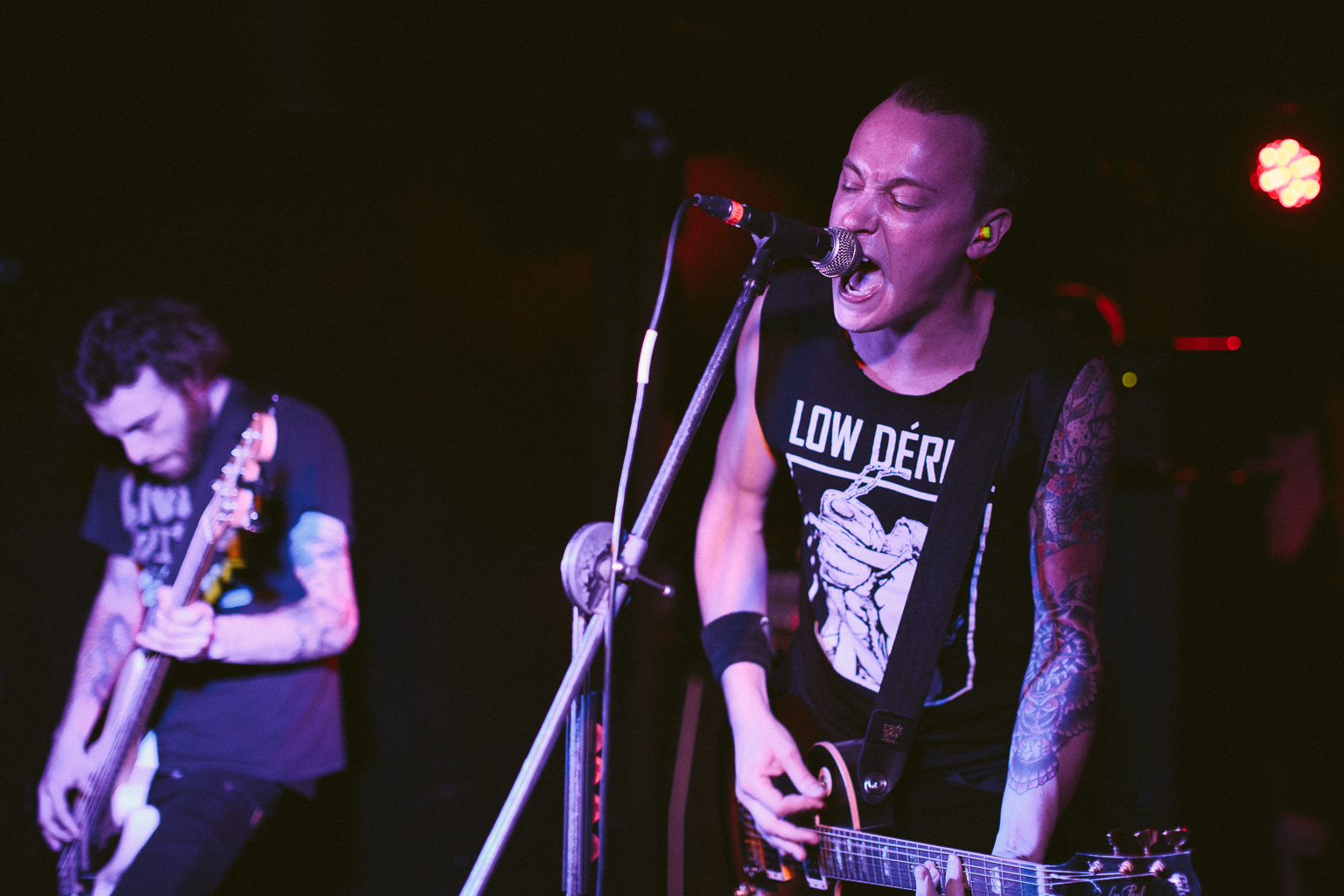
- The Flatliners live in Brisbane, Australia, in 2013

Background information
- Origin: Richmond Hill, Ontario, Canada
- Genres: Punk rock; melodic hardcore; ska punk (early)
- Years active: 2002–present
- Labels: Union Label Group; Fat Wreck Chords; Rise; Dine Alone; Equal Vision
- Members: Chris Cresswell; Scott Brigham; Jon Darbey; Paul Ramirez
- Website: theflatliners.com

The Flatliners are a Canadian punk rock band from Richmond Hill, Ontario. Since their formation in 2002, the band has been a growing influence in the Toronto punk/ska movement, with consistently well-received albums and live shows.

== History ==
The band self-released its debut album, Destroy to Create in 2005; after signing to Stomp Records, it was reissued on July 19, 2005. It saw the band mix punk rock with ska, and was promoted with a Canadian tour. In March and April 2006, the band went on the Frostbite Tour alongside Death by Stereo, Bigwig, and Big D and the Kids Table. They appeared at the Ska Weekend festival at the end of April 2006. In October 2006, they went on a Canadian tour with Much the Same, and then embarked on a short US tour alongside Time Again, Against All Authority, and the Know How.

The Flatliners signed to Fat Wreck Chords in April 2007; they would distribute the band's next release in every country but Canada, where it was handled by Stomp Records. Following this, they appeared at the Wakestock festival, toured the US West Coast with No Use for a Name, and performed on the two Canadian dates of the Warped Tour. Their second album, The Great Awake, was released on September 4, 2007. In September and October 2007, they went on a Canadian tour, prior to joining up with the Toasters, Saint Alvia Cartel, and the Peacocks. A music video for "Eulogy" was posted online in November 2007. They ending the year with a US tour with A Wilhelm Scream.

In February and March 2008, the band appeared on the Fat Wreck Chords Tour, alongside NOFX and No Use for a Name. Following this, they went on a US West Coast tour supporting the Loved Ones and a Canadian tour with the Rebel Spell. In May 2008, the band performed at the Groezrock festival in Belgium, which was followed by a Canadian tour with Strike Anywhere, Hostage Life, This Is a Standoff, and Carpenter. Following this, they appeared at the two Canadian dates of Warped Tour and the Cutting Edge Music Festival. They toured with Less Than Jake, Reel Big Fish, and the Real Deal in September 2008, and supported NOFX on their Canadian tour in October 2008. They ended the year with an appearance at The Fest in Florida. In March 2009, the band appeared at the Harvest of Hope Fest, and then played Groezrock in Belgium soon after. Following this, they went on a tour of Europe with NOFX; Snuff appeared on three of the shows. In May 2009, they went on a Canadian tour with Hostage Life, leading up to an appearance at the S.C.E.N.E. Music Festival. They then appeared on Warped Tour again; coinciding with this, they released a split with the Snips.

Between July and September 2009, the band toured across Europe, which included an appearance at the Reading and Leeds Festivals. Shortly after this, they played a few shows with Strung Out and Pour Habit, leading up to a performance at The Fest in October 2009. Around this time, they released the Cynics 7-inch vinyl record. They ended the year supporting the Dropkick Murphys on their headlining tour of the US. On February 9, 2010, Cavalcade was announced for release in two months' time; its artwork and track listing were posted online. In March 2010, they went on an Australian tour with No Fun at All and then went on a North American tour with Broadway Calls and Cobra Skulls through to the following month. Preceded by "Carry the Banner", Cavalcade was released in April 2010. It received rave reviews from numerous critics. Shortly afterwards, the band performed at Rockfest in Belgium. In August 2010, the band went on an East Coast and Midwest tour with the Mighty Mighty Bosstones and Teenage Bottlerocket.

The band toured almost non-stop from 2006 to 2019, starting out as the opening band for artists such as Joan Jett, Dropkick Murphys, NOFX and Less Than Jake. They have also appeared in numerous festival lineups, including the Warped Tour, the Reading and Leeds Festivals, and Riot Fest. Their fourth album Dead Language was nominated for a 2014 Juno Award in the category of Metal/Hard Music Album of the Year." Their 2017 release Inviting Light did equally well.

In October 2024, after a long association with NOFX and Fat Wreck Chords, the band played on the final day (Sunday) of the 3 day Punk In Drublic Festival in San Pedro. The festival was a celebration and final farewell for NOFX after they toured North America, Europe, Australia and other countries over the prior year before their retirement. The festival line up included over 20 bands including Pennywise, Less Than Jake, Lagwagon, the Descendents, and the Dropkick Murphys.

In December 2025, the band signed with Equal Vision Records and released the single "Misanthropy & Me". 2026 saw the release of the album Cold World, in support of which the band released a videogame in which players can embody the different members of the band.

== Band members ==
- Chris Cresswell – vocals, guitar
- Scott Brigham – guitar
- Jon Darbey – bass
- Paul Ramirez – drums

== Discography ==
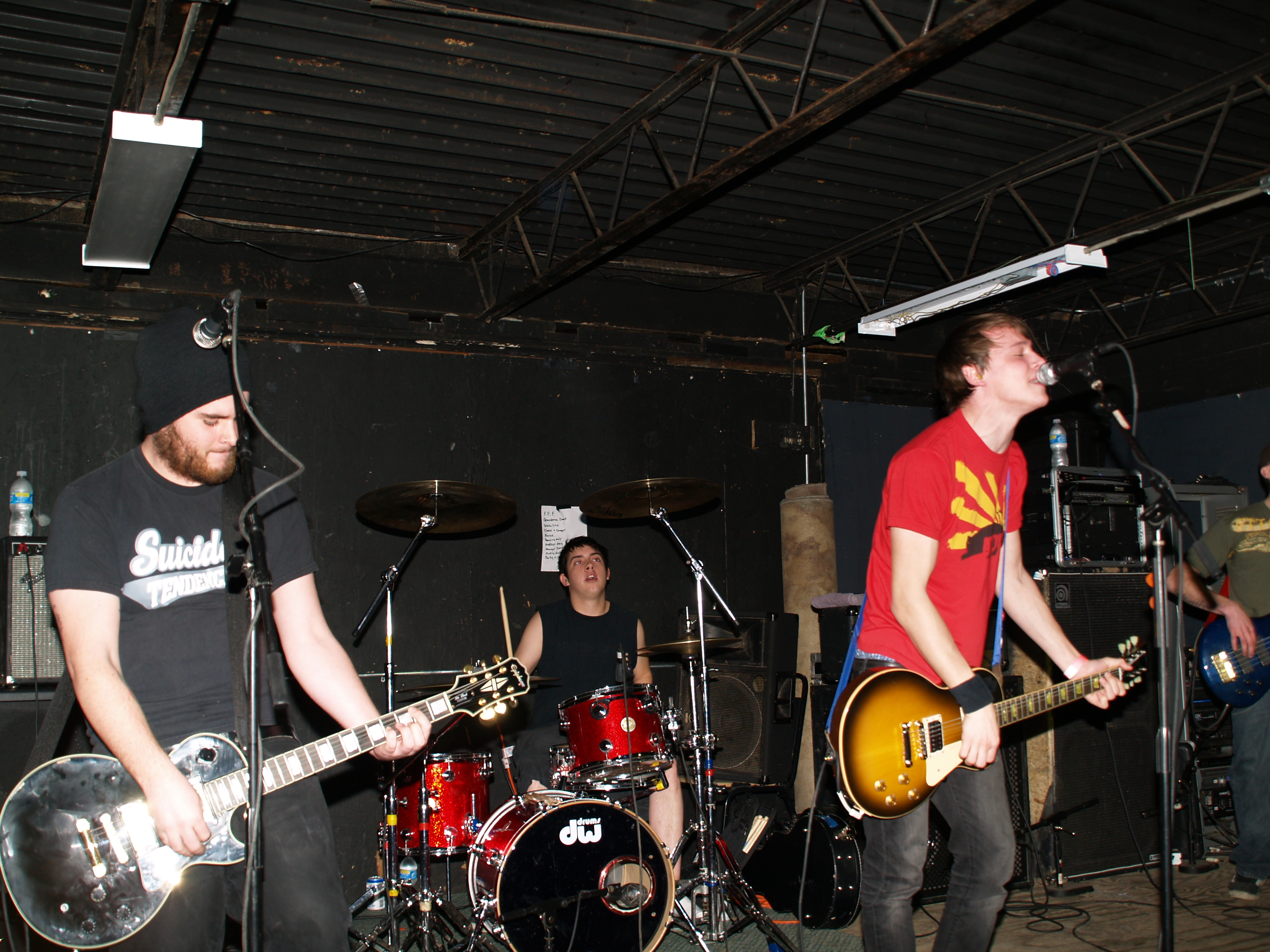
The Flatliners in concert in 2007

Studio albums

- Destroy to Create (2005) (Union Label Group)
- The Great Awake (2007) (Fat Wreck Chords)
- Cavalcade (2010) (Fat Wreck Chords) No. 54 CAN
- Dead Language (2013) (Fat Wreck Chords)
- Inviting Light (2017) (Rise Records, Dine Alone Records)
- New Ruin (2022) (Fat Wreck Records, Dine Alone Records)
- Cold World (2026) (Equal Vision Records, Dine Alone Records)

EPs and singles

- Demo (2002) (Drive Studios)
- Sleep Is For Bitches EP (2007) (Union Label Group)
- Cynics 7" (2009) (Fat Wreck Chords)
- Monumental 7" (2010) (Fat Wreck Chords)
- Count Your Bruises 7" (2011) (Fat Wreck Chords)
- Caskets Full 7" (2013) (Fat Wreck Chords)
- Resuscitation of the Year 7" (2015) (Fat Wreck Chords)
- Nerves EP (2016) (Dine Alone Records)
- Mass Candescence EP (2018) (Dine Alone Records)

Splits

- Run Like Hell 7" Split w/ The Snips , Paper & Plastick (2009)
- Under the Influence Volume 16 7" Split w/ Dead To Me (2011)
- Southwards/Meanwhile In Hell 7" Split w/ ASTPAI (2012)
- Calutron Girls/Dagger 7" split w/ Make Do and Mend, Rise Records (2013)

Compilation appearances

- Who Said Ska's Dead?, Cresswell Records (2003)
- Like Nobodies Business (Spill Your Guts), Pezmosis Music Productions (2005)
- We Don't Die We Multiply (There's A Problem), 3rd Generation Recordz (2006)
- Like Nobodies Business II (...And the World Files For Chapter 11), Pezmosis Music Productions (2006)
- Ska Is Dead 3 (Open Hearts and Bloody Grins), Stomp Records (2007)
- All Aboard: A Tribute to Johnny Cash (Cry! Cry! Cry!), Anchorless Records (2008)
- The Songs of Tony Sly: A Tribute, Fat Wreck Chords (2013)
- Fat in New York, Fat Wreck Chords (2013)
- Division of Spoils, Fat Wreck Chords (2015)
- Sea Shepherd Benefit vol. 2, Uncle M Music (2017)

== Videography ==
- "Fred's Got Slacks" (2005)
- "Broken Bones" (2006)
- "Eulogy" (2007)
- "This Respirator" (2008)
- "Carry the Banner" (2010)
- "Monumental" (2010)
- "Count Your Bruises" (2011)
- "Arrhythmic Palpitations" (Dead to Me cover – 2012)
- "Birds of England" (2013)
- "Tail Feathers" (2014)
- "Resuscitation of the Year" (2015)
- "Indoors" (2017)
- "Performative Hours" (2022)
- "Souvenir" (2022)
- "Rat King" (2022)
- "It'll Hurt" (2023)
- "Good, You?" (2026)
- "Pulpit" (2026)
- "And They're Off" (2026)
