= Hunt club =

Hunt Club, hunt club, or hunting club may refer to:

- Hunt Club, area of Ottawa, Canada
  - Hunt Club Road
- Hunt Club Park, a different neighbourhood in Ottawa
- The Hunt Club, 2010 album by Sector Seven
- Hunt Club (film), a 2023 film starring Mickey Rourke
- hunting club, either:
  - Club (weapon) used for hunting
  - Club (organization) for hunters
