= GFK =

GFK may refer to:

== Transportation ==
- Grand Forks International Airport, North Dakota, United States
- Grand Forks (Amtrak station), North Dakota, United States

== Other uses ==
- GfK, a German market research organisation
- GFK (band), a Canadian hardcore metal band
- Fiberglass
- Ghostface Killah (born 1970), American rapper
- Patpatar language
- Gazişehir Gaziantep F.K., a football club in Turkey
