= Johnny Perrin =

- Born: John Draper Perrin IV; 10 June 1983 (age 43); Winnipeg, Manitoba, Canada
- Origin: Winnipeg
- Genres: Punk rock, hardcore punk, heavy metal, ska
- Years active: 1998–present

Johnny Perrin (born 10 June 1983) is a Canadian punk rock musician from Winnipeg, Manitoba, Canada. He is the former frontman of the Winnipeg ska band Grandpa's Army (1998–2000), which released an album in 2000 called G Sides and A Sides. In 2002, two members of Grandpa's Army, Sam Thompson and Alex Southern, made a documentary about Grandpa's Army, The Truth is Disgusting, which was released on YouTube.

In 2000, Perrin recorded an EP, Pay To The Order Of, with the band TBA.

Perrin appeared in the 2004 Dogme 95 film The Smokestack Wager. In 2004, he recorded the EP Den of Iniquity with a Winnipeg band of the same name. In 2005, he played drums for The Brat Attack and that band's album From This Beauty Comes Chaos And Mayhem. In 2012, he played drums for the Ottawa band Up 'N' Atom. He sang crew vocals on the 2013 Misery Signals album Absent Light.

Perrin is the son of John Draper Perrin III, great-grandson of John Draper Perrin, and grandson of John Draper Perrin Jr. He works in management for the musical instrument retailer Long & McQuade.

== Discography ==
- 2000: G Sides and A Sides, Grandpa's Army, Borracho Records
- 2000: Pay To The Order Of EP, TBA, Spock Attack Records
- 2004: Den of Iniquity EP, Den of Iniquity, Independent
- 2005: From This Beauty Comes Chaos And Mayhem, Brat Attack, Underground Operations
