= I'm Easy =

I'm Easy may refer to:

== Albums ==
- I'm Easy (album), 1976 album by Keith Carradine
- I'm Easy, a 2007 compilation album by Clarence Carter

== Songs ==
- "I'm Easy" (Keith Carradine song), 1975, from the film Nashville
- "I'm Easy" (Faith No More song), a version of the Commodores song "Easy"
- "I'm Easy", a song by Boz Scaggs from Boz Scaggs
- "I'm Easy", spelling of David Lee Roth’s version of "Baby I'm Easy" from Billy Field’s album Bad Habits
- "I'm Easy", a song by Brendan Benson from Lapalco
- "I'm Easy", a song by Pink Cream 69 from Food for Thought
- "I'm Easy", a song by The Meligrove Band from Planets Conspire
