= I Hate Sally vs. GFK: Sp(l)it EP =

I Hate Sally Vs GFK: Sp(l)it EP

EP by I Hate Sally
- Released: December 11, 2007
- Recorded: 2006
- Genre: Hardcore punk Thrash metal Mathcore
- Length: 15:57
- Label: Underground Operations

I Hate Sally chronology
Don't Worry Lady (2006)	I Hate Sally Vs GFK: Sp(l)it EP (2007)

Sp(l)it EP (also known as just Split) is a split EP between the hardcore/thrash band I Hate Sally and the thrash metal band GFK released in 2007 on CD and 7" vinyl.

== Track listing ==
Side A - I Hate Sally

1. "Half Truth (A Thief)" - 2:42
2. "Show Me a Liar (A Liar)" - 2:35
3. "A Whole Lie (A Fool)" - 4:23

Side B - GFK

1. "As Said By..." - 2:19
2. "This Ain't a Love Song" - 1:53
3. "Relationships Of Power" - 2:03
