= Diemonds =

Canadian musical group

- Origin: Toronto, Ontario, Canada
- Genres: Hard rock, heavy metal, NWOTHM
- Years active: 2006–present
- Labels: Underground Operations, eOne Music, Napalm, Spiritual Beast
- Members: Priya Panda; C.C. Diemond; Tyrone Buccione; Daniel Dekay; Kyle Lecourt
- Past members: Al Biddle; Alan Riches; Paul Mancuso; Vassil Mester; Aiden Tranquada; Tommy Cee

Diemonds is a Canadian hard rock band formed in 2006 in Toronto and fronted by Priya Panda.

== History ==
=== In the Rough ===
Diemonds independently released their debut EP In the Rough in October 2008. Diemonds subsequently toured Canada and the United States heavily and played with bands like L.A. Guns, Faster Pussycat, John Corabi, Teenage Head, Rough Trade, and New York's Semi Precious Weapons. In the Rough was later re-released on limited edition cassette.

=== The Bad Pack ===
On August 10, 2012, it was announced that Diemonds had signed with Toronto based independent punk rock record label, Underground Operations. The announcement also came with the news that the long-awaited full-length debut from Diemonds, The Bad Pack, would be released via Underground Operations with distribution through Universal Music Canada on October 2, 2012. The Bad Pack was recorded with Jon Drew (Fucked Up, Tokyo Police Club). Underground Operations president and founder Mark Spicoluk commented on the signing of Diemonds saying "Authenticity. Most bands try to fake it and look stupid in the process but Diemonds are as authentic as it gets. I'm honored for UO to have the opportunity to play a pivotal role at this stage in Diemonds journey."

Diemonds toured consistently through North America in support of The Bad Pack including a direct support to Santa Cruz, California glam metal band Dirty Penny. The relentless touring included multiple appearances at the Rocklahoma festival as well as appearances at Seattle Hempfest, Heavy MTL, and SXSW. The band has also had the opportunity to play support slots to Guns N' Roses guitarist Slash, The Darkness, Megadeth, Steel Panther, Sebastian Bach, and most recently Kiss on the annual Kiss Kruise.

=== eOne/Napalm Records signing and Never Wanna Die ===
On May 1, 2015, it was announced that Diemonds would release their second full-length album, Never Wanna Die, via eOne Music/Underground Operations. Never Wanna Die was produced by multiple Juno Award winning producer Eric Ratz (Billy Talent, Monster Truck, Cancer Bats) and was released August 14, 2015. This record would be the first time the band sat down and worked with a producer. This is what the band had to say about working with Eric, "We were in the studio every fucking day for like three months. That was a learning experience. You get to immerse yourself in the project and we'd never had the opportunity to spend that much time working on our music. We'd never worked with a producer before. The whole thing was a big learning experience and we think that as a band, we've grown exponentially with our style, our chops, and our songwriting."

Vocalist Priya Panda also discussed some of the lyrical content and the messages throughout this album "The whole album kind of has a similar theme: Kind of stepping away from things that can bring you down and grow stronger from them, and learning lessons from them, and sticking true to who you are." Following the release of Never Wanna Die, the band embarked on a Fall headlining tour across Canada in support of the new record as well as an appearance at Japanese Assault Festival 2015 in November marking the band's first performance in Japan.

In July 2016, Diemonds supported Steel Panther on their Canadian tour.

== Accolades ==
- Classic Rock Magazine – ranked No. 4 for Best Music Videos of 2013 with "Get the Fuck Outta Here"
- High Times Magazine – 'Doobie Award' for Best Underground Artist 2013
- Juno Awards – Never Wanna Die nominated for 2016 Heavy Metal album of the year.

== Band members ==
=== Current ===
- Priya Panda – vocals
- C.C. Diemond – guitar
- Daniel Dekay – lead guitar
- Tyrone Buccione – bass
- Kyle Lecourt – drums

=== Former ===
- Al Biddle – drums (2009–2010)
- Alan 'Yeti' Riches – drums (2007–2009), guitar (2010–2011)
- Paul 'Cuzo' Mancuso – bass (2008–2011)
- Vassil 'Vaggy' Mester – drums (2006–2008)
- Tommy 'Welp' Cee – bass (2012–2016)
- Aiden Tranquada – drums (2012–2017)

== Discography ==
=== Extended plays ===
- In the Rough (2008)

=== Studio albums ===
- The Bad Pack (2012)
- Never Wanna Die (2015)
- Diemonds (2018)

== Videography ==
Title	Year	Director	Album
"Highway"	2009	Matthew Chrones Scott	In the Rough
"Take on the Night"	2012	Matthew Chrones Scott	The Bad Pack
"Livin' Tonight"	2012	Matthew Chrones Scott	The Bad Pack
"Get the F&$k Outta Here"	2012	Matthew Chrones Scott	The Bad Pack
"Over It (Lyric Video)"	2016	Matthew Chrones Scott	Never Wanna Die
"Ain't That Kinda Girl"	2015	Matthew Chrones Scott & C.C. Diemond	Never Wanna Die
"Secret"	2016	Matthew Chrones Scott	Never Wanna Die
"Our Song"	2018	Skye Sweetnam of Sumo Cyco	DIEMONDS
