= Don't Worry Lady =

Studio album by I Hate Sally
- Released: October 2006
- Genres: Post-hardcore; Thrash metal Hardcore punk
- Length: 43:46
- Label: Underground Operations
- Producer: Kurt Ballou

I Hate Sally chronology
| The Plague EP (2005) | Don't Worry Lady (2006) | I Hate Sally Vs GFK: Sp(l)it EP (2007) |

Don't Worry Lady is the second and final full-length album by the hardcore/thrash band I Hate Sally. The album was released in 2006. Shortly after this, I Hate Sally was signed to Vagrant Records and the album was re-released for the US and UK in 2007 on the band's second label.

== Lyrical themes ==
Song titles on the album contain many references to female Biblical characters, though frontwoman Dee Prescott has stated that the album does not have an overtly feminine tone. The album's title is derived from a sound clip between track three and four of a man stating "Don't worry lady, everything is going to be alright now." It is taken from an after school special with a police officer saying the line, a sound clip that I Hate Sally used in live shows before the release of Don't Worry Lady.

== Critical reception ==
The album had average reviews, with the drumming and guitar riffs being praised in particular. A recurring issue with reviewers was the mix of genres employed by the band.

== Track listing ==
1. "Eve, Rule Over Him" - 0:26
2. "Song of Deborah" - 3:22
3. "Hannah Hannah" - 3:27
4. "Martha Served" - 2:18
5. "Iscah's Life" - 8:56
6. "Iscah's Cancer" - 2:55
7. "Bathsheba of Seven" - 2:39
8. "Mary! Mary!" - 4:11
9. "Anna's Empty Conscious for the Blessed" - 9:51
10. "Eve, Be Dear to Him" - 5:41
