= Generation Genocide =

Studio album by Jersey
- Released: April 27, 2004
- Recorded: EMAC Recording Studios
- Genre: Ska punk, pop punk
- Label: Virgin Records

Jersey chronology
Definition (2001)	Generation Genocide (2004)

Generation Genocide is the third and final album released by Jersey on April 27, 2004.

== Track listing ==
1. "This Town"
2. "Generation Genocide"
3. "Story of '53"
4. "Shop Floor"
5. "Crossfire"
6. "One Way St."
7. "Violation Detonation"
8. "Lessons"
9. "Interlude"
10. "Saturday Night"
11. "Richmond Resurrection"
12. "Old Bones and Dirty Coffins"
13. "Hourglass"
14. "City Streets"

== Personnel ==
- Siegfried Meier - Editing, second engineer
