= Jersey (band) =

Canadian ska punk band

- Origin: Burlington, Ontario; Canada
- Genres: Ska, punk rock, pop-punk
- Years active: 1996–2005; 2011; 2014
- Labels: Raw Energy, Fueled by Ramen, Virgin
- Past members: Greg Taylor; Johnny Lubera; Sean McNab; Jordan Hastings; Kevin Harris; Sarah Brooksbank; Ian Blackwood; Bob Shaw; Tracy Brown

Jersey was a Canadian ska punk band from Burlington, Ontario. The band was active from 1996 to 2005, reuniting in 2011 and 2014 but has not released new material since 2004.

== History ==
In 1997, the band released a demo tape which they sold at local concerts. The band received media attention partially because frontman Greg Taylor was known from his previous band, Grade.

The band was signed to Southern Ontario punk label Raw Energy and released No Turning Back in 1998. American record label Fueled by Ramen put out the band's second release, The Battle's Just Begun, a year later. The band began touring Canada and the United States heavily in support of the album as well as 2001's release Definition Recorded and produced by Brian McTernan at Salad Days in Baltimore. In November 2001, they performed in Toronto with Ensign and Suicide Machines.

The band signed to Virgin Records in 2003 and producer Dan Brodbeck (Headstrong, Garnet Rogers) signed on to produce Jersey's third album, Generation Genocide. Generation Genocide was released in Fall 2003. The album was released in the United States in the spring 2004.

Jersey toured with and/or shared the stage with Grade, Reach the Sky, NOFX, Hi Standard, Less Than Jake, MXPX, PTC, One Man Army, Anti Flag, The Unseen, Cooter, Slick Shoes, Propagandhi, The Offspring, The Voodoo Glow Skulls, The Criminals, Ann Beretta, Trunk, Hot Water Music, Citizen Fish, Alexisonfire, Simple Plan, Sum 41, Yellowcard, and Eve 6.

In 2005, they announced they were splitting up citing creative differences.

The band performed several reunion shows through 2011 and 2014, without creating any new music together.

== Band members ==
Final lineup

- Greg Taylor – guitar, lead vocals
- Johnny Lubera – bass
- Sean McNab – guitar, vocals
- Jordan Hastings – drums

Former

- Kevin Harris – drums
- Ian Blackwood – drums
- Sarah Brooksbank – vocals
- Bob Shaw – sax
- Tracy Brown – sax
- Gene Figgley – bass

== Discography ==
=== Albums ===
- No Turning Back (1998)
- In Friends We Trust - Jersey/Outspan split - Raw Energy (1998)
- The Battle's Just Begun (1999)
- Definition (2001)
- Generation Genocide (2004)

== Subsequent projects ==
As of August 2006, the members of Jersey have gone on to other endeavours.

- Greg Taylor is currently playing with The Saint Alvia Cartel.
- Sean McNab plays standup bass with psychobilly band The Creepshow.
- Jordan Hastings is the drummer for Alexisonfire and is also part of the trio Say Yes. As of January 2016 He is a touring/session drummer for Billy Talent.
- Johnny Lubera was married in the fall of 2006.
- Ian Blackwood sings and plays guitar in The Artist Life.
- Sarah Brooksbank is now married to Beau Beau from Avail.

== See also ==
- List of bands from Canada
