= Sectorseven =

Canadian punk band

SectorSeven
- Origin: Grimsby, Ontario, Canada
- Genre: Punk
- Years active: 1992–2011, 2021–present
- Labels: Raw Energy Records, Sonic Unyon, Bright Side Records, United Records
- Members: Jon Gauthier; Lee Williamson; Mike Burke; Brad Parent; Ryan Allan; Steve Kramer; Ryan Scott Gibbs
- Website: http://www.sectorvii.com (defunct)

SectorSeven is a Canadian punk band from in Grimsby, Ontario, founded in 1992. Their name, which was originally two words, is taken from the 1969 science-fiction novel The Andromeda Strain.

== History ==
The band began with Lee Williamson (guitar), Mike Burke (drums), Jon Gauthier (vocals, guitar), Brad Parent (bass), and Ryan Allan (guitar).

In 1998, they released their first album, Comfort Zone, on United Records. In 1999, they released Along the Way, on Raw Energy Records. The album received airplay on college radio and was profiled on Edge 102's Indie Hour with Dave Bookman. Much Music VJ, Rachel Perry called it "some of the best Canadian punk I've heard since Propagandhi."

In 2000, Allan left the band and they were signed to Sonic Unyon, which released both of their previous albums as the set Dual. The label then sent SectorSeven and two other clients, Rocket Science and Chore, on a cross-Canada tour. SectorSeven was nominated for a Much Music Video Award in 2000.

The band released their self-titled album in 2002.

SectorSeven went through a period of inactivity starting around 2003 due to other commitments. Although it was rumored that they had broken up, that was never in fact the case. They continue to write songs and play occasional live shows. By 2009, Parent had left the band and was replaced by bassist Ryan Scott Gibbs. In November 2009, they entered Beach Road Studios with Producer/Engineer Siegfried Meier to record a full-length album, on Bright Side Records. The Hunt Club was released in April 2010.

Ryan Allan was the founder of SBC Skateboard Magazine; as a result, the band frequently played shows with action sports themes, including Wakestock, Canada's largest wakeboard contest, Skatespace, the Canadian Cup of skateboarding, and Fox Racing's annual motocross party. Their music can also be found on motocross, skateboard and wakeboard videos.

== Discography ==
- Comfort Zone, 1998, United Records
- Along the Way, 1999, Raw Energy Records
- Dual, 2001, Sonic Unyon
- Sectorseven, 2002, Sonic Unyon
- The Hunt Club, 2010, Bright Side Records
- Dead End, 2021
