= The Zilis =

- Origin: Hamilton, Ontario, Canada
- Genres: Rock and Roll
- Years active: 2012–2017
- Labels: Independent
- Spinoffs: The Bleeding Idahos
- Members: Sean Royle; Zander Lamothe; Justin Bozzo

The Zilis were a Canadian rock and roll group from Hamilton, Ontario, active from 2012 to 2017. Two of the members continue to write original music as The Bleeding Idahos.

== Biography ==
The group began playing covers as The Led Hot Zili Peppers in 2009 to pay for the expenses of their former band, Dean Lickyer. When Dean Lickyer disbanded, Royle and Bozzo began singing and writing original music as The Zilis. Touring frequently, they released two critically acclaimed albums between 2012 and 2014.

The Zilis played festivals and concerts alongside notable acts, including July Talk, The Sheepdogs, Said The Whale, Monster Truck, Arkells, Hey Rosetta!, Protest the Hero, Ubiquitous Synergy Seeker, David Wilcox, Marianas Trench, Flogging Molly, Matt Mays & El Torpedo, Kiss, Bon Jovi and Wheatus.

The group went on hiatus in 2017. Royle and Lamothe have since become music teachers and session musicians, and Bozzo is now an attorney. Royle and Bozzo formed a new band, The Bleeding Idahos.

== Awards ==
- Hamilton Music Awards – "Rock Recording of the Year" (for Sketches) nomination (2012)
- The Deli Magazine – "Artist of the Month" (March 2015)
- Hamilton Music Awards – "Bassist of the Year" (2015)
- Hamilton Music Awards – "Alternative/Indie Rock Recording of the Year" (for Sketches II) nomination (2015)

== Band members ==
- Sean Royle – vocals, electric guitar, acoustic guitar, banjitar, organ, harmonica, melodica, percussion (2012–2021)
- Zander Lamothe – drums, percussion, vocals (2012–2020)
- Justin Bozzo – vocals, bass guitar, electric guitar, acoustic guitar, piano, organ, harmonica, kazoo, percussion (2012–2021)

== Discography ==
=== Sketches (2012) ===
1. Mattina Sunshine
2. Coyote Nowhere
3. The Plight of Mrs. Brezhnev (Pt. I)
4. The Meter
5. Only Love
6. Fool's Paradise
7. Ginny's Been Gone
8. Trumpets of the Tide

=== Sketches II (2014) ===
1. Trust in Me, Lorraine
2. Diamondback
3. Don't Ever Change
4. Not Around
5. Ballad of a Broken Heart
6. (All I Do Is) Treat You Right
7. On the West Side of Town
8. The Way Love Goes

== See also ==
- Folk Radio UK
