= San Sebastian (band) =

San Sebastian formerly: Pumps
- Origin: Hamilton, Ontario, Canada
- Genres: Indie; Pop; Rock
- Years active: 2008–2015
- Label: Universal Music Canada
- Members: Brodie Dawson; Greg Veerman; Mike Veerman; Sean Dawson; Ted Paterson
- Website: myspace.com/wearesansebastian

San Sebastian is an indie pop rock band from Hamilton, Ontario, Canada. Formerly known as Pumps, they appeared on the MuchMusic original series, disBAND.

== Biography ==
Formerly known as the Pumps, San Sebastian was formed by two sets of brothers and Ted Paterson. In 2009, following the release of their debut EP, the band won the "New Artist/Group of the Year" award at the Hamilton Music Awards. They started developing a following after appearing on the MuchMusic original series, disBAND, in 2010. After appearing on the show, they were signed to Universal Canada.

In May 2010 the band released their first single "Wake Up" via ITunes while simultaneously releasing a video as well. On May 11, 2010, bassist Greg Veerman wrote on MuchMusic's blog, informing fans that their debut album would be released Summer 2010. The band's second single "Young Youth" was chosen as the iTunes single of the week on August 26, 2010, and the video for Young Youth was released November 26, 2010. Bassist Greg Veerman updated fans on their debut album, the band is currently aiming for an early 2011 release.

On October 4, 2011, the band released their debut LP Relations. In a review of the album, Exclaim called Relations a "largely redundant and derivative album".

On July 16, 2015, the band announced on their Facebook page that they had been disbanded for some time and all had moved onto their own individual projects.

=== Personnel ===
- Brodie Dawson – Guitar
- Greg Veerman – Bass
- Mike Veerman – Vocals
- Sean Dawson – Guitar
- Ted Paterson – Drums

== Discography ==
=== Studio albums ===
Relations

- Released: October 4, 2011
- Writer: San Sebastian
- Singles: "Wake Up", "Young Youth", "Say I'm Alright" & Baby"

=== Singles ===
Year	Single	Album
2010	"Wake Up"	This Madness
2010	"Young Youth"	This Madness

=== Music videos ===
Year	Song	Director
2010	"Wake Up"	Hill Kourkoutis
2010	"Young Youth"	
2011	"Baby"	
2012	"Say I'm Alright"	
