= Ductape Records =

- Founded: 1997
- Founder: Zach Feldberg
- Genre: Pop
- Country of origin: Canada
- Location: Toronto, Ontario, Canada
- Official website: http://www.ductape.org

Ductape Records is a Toronto-based independent record label that was spawned from a magazine of the same name in 1997. The label's website was updated in 2007, stating that it was "on hiatus indefinitely, but some catalogue items are still available". Previously, it had not been updated since 2003. It is unclear whether or not it still exists as a functioning company, as the label was always known for its sporadic release schedule. Founder Zach Feldberg also hosted an online radio show under the name Ductape.

Some of the bands on the label have gone on to greater prominence, including The Meligrove Band and The Carnations, from which Thomas D'Arcy would later form Small Sins.

== Full Discography ==
- DV-SG7-1 - Marilyn's Vitamins - Squeegee Girl (7", February 1997)
- DCD-000-2 - Eww... You're a Girl & Girls Suck! - Somethin' for the Ladies (CD, July 1998)
- DCD-001-2 - Various Artists - Music to Fall Asleep By (2xCD, February 1999)
- DCD-002-2 - The Stiffs - Forever in a Day (CD, June 1999)
- DCD-003-2 - Various Artists - Spilled Milk (CD, November 1999)
- DCD-004-2 - Noah's Arkweld - Fun! (CD, originally on Squirtgun Records)
- DCD-005-2 - The Meligrove Band - Stars & Guitars (CD, April 2000)
- DCD-006-2 - Dead Letter Dept. - Dead Letter Dept. (CD, August 2001)
- DCD-007-2 - The Carnations - The Carnations (CD, December 2001)
- DCD-008-2 - Four Square - When Weeks were Weekends (CD, January 2002)
- DCD-009-2 - The Meligrove Band - Let it Grow (CD, October 2002, co-released with Endearing Records)
- DCD-010-2 - The Carnations - In Good Time (CD, September 2003)

== Distribution ==
Ductape is distributed by Sonic Unyon Distribution and Universal Music Canada.

== See also ==
- List of record labels
