= Never Wanna Die =

Studio album by Diemonds
- Released: August 14, 2015
- Recorded: Phase One Studios, Vespa Studio
- Genre: Hard rock, glam rock, heavy metal
- Length: 34:14
- Label: Underground Operations, eOne Music, Napalm Records, Spiritual Beast
- Producer: Eric Ratz

Diemonds chronology
The Bad Pack (2012)	Never Wanna Die (2015)	Diemonds (2018)

Never Wanna Die is the second full-length album by Canadian hard rock band Diemonds, released on August 14, 2015. The album was recorded at Phase One Studios and Vespa Studio in Toronto, Ontario with JUNO Award-winning producer Eric Ratz. The album was nominated for Heavy Metal Album of the Year at the 2016 JUNO Awards.

Vocalist Priya Panda discusses her views on the creative process, "The album was inspired by life and the seeing of both the darkest of the dark and then seeing a small light at the end of the tunnel that you chase until it becomes bigger and huger and before you know it you’re the light and you’re standing in the middle of a glowing orb radiating everything positive and good back into the world. That's how I experienced the world when I was creating and recording this album anyway."

This album was dedicated to the former members of Diemonds who have died.

== Track listing ==
No.	Title	Length
1.	"Never Wanna Die"	3:53
2.	"Hell is Full"	3:10
3.	"Over It"	3:09
4.	"Ain't That Kinda Girl"	2:57
5.	"Secret"	4:31
6.	"Better Off Dead"	3:39
7.	"Forever Untamed"	3:17
8.	"Wild At Heart"	3:05
9.	"Meet Your Maker"	3:03
10.	"Save Your Life"	3:30
Total length:		34:14

== Personnel ==
- Priya Panda – lead vocals
- Daniel Dekay– lead guitar
- CC Diemond – rhythm guitar
- Tommy Cee- bass
- Aiden Tranquada – drums
