= Cavalcade (The Flatliners album) =

Studio album by The Flatliners
- Released: April 13, 2010
- Recorded: July 2009 at Drive Studios
- Genres: Punk rock, alternative rock
- Length: 39:22
- Label: Fat Wreck Chords
- Producer: Steve Rizun

The Flatliners chronology
The Great Awake (2007)	Cavalcade (2010)	Dead Language (2013)

Cavalcade is the third full-length studio album by the Flatliners. It was released on April 13, 2010. It features 12 songs, one of which (Filthy Habits) was previously released on their 7-inch EP Cynics. Following the same style as its predecessor, The Great Awake, the band continues to expand and mature with a punk rock sound as opposed to a ska punk sound shown in their debut album, Destroy to Create.

== Reception ==
Exclaim! named Cavalcade the No. 4 Punk album of 2010. Exclaim! writer Aaron Zorgel said "The Flatliners have landed on a unique amalgamation of '90s skate punk and anthemic alt-rock. The end result is a record that carries all the intensity of Bad Religion, while maintaining the lyrical sensitivity of the Replacements"

Writing for Punknews.org, reviewer Joe Pelone described Cavalcade as energetic punk rock with a notably hopeful tone, emphasizing that while the album touches on topics such as economic disparity and familial strife, it "never wallow[s] in pity."

Writing for PopMatters, Matthew Fiander praised the album’s energy and melodic approach to punk rock but expressed reservations about its overall tone, arguing that while Cavalcade frequently aims for hopefulness, it dwells too heavily on negativity to fully sustain that balance, and rated the album 6 out of 10

== Track listing ==
1. "The Calming Collection"
2. "Carry the Banner"
3. "Bleed"
4. "Here Comes Treble"
5. "He Was a Jazzman"
6. "Shithawks"
7. "Monumental"
8. "Filthy Habits"
9. "Liver Alone"
10. "Sleep Your Life Away"
11. "Count Your Bruises"
12. "New Years Resolutions"

== Video ==
Official Video-clip released for:

1. "Monumental (2010)"
2. "Carry The Banner (2010)"
3. "Count Your Bruises (2011)"
