= The Battle's Just Begun =

Studio album by Jersey
- Released: August 24, 1999
- Genre: Ska punk, hardcore punk
- Length: 32:55
- Label: Fueled by Ramen
- Producer: Justin Koop

Jersey chronology
No Turning Back (1998)	The Battle's Just Begun (1999)	Definition (2001)

The Battle's Just Begun is the second album released by Jersey for Fueled by Ramen in 1999.

== Track listing ==
No.	Title	Length
1.	"Eye to Eye"	2:07
2.	"Sweet Redemption"	3:18
3.	"The Battle's Just Begun"	3:17
4.	"Glass Dick"	3:20
5.	"Untouchable"	3:35
6.	"809"	4:08
7.	"Fadeaway"	3:34
8.	"1959"	2:55
9.	"The Only Girl"	3:01
10.	"Poison Ivy"	3:33
Total length:		32:48
