= Shimmering Lights =

Studio album by The Meligrove Band
- Released: September 21, 2010
- Recorded: 2009
- Genre: Indie Rock
- Labels: Last Gang Records; Nevado Records

The Meligrove Band chronology
Planets Conspire (2006)	Shimmering Lights (2010)	Bones of Things (2014)

Singles from Shimmering Lights
- 1. "Halflight"; 2. "Racingtoshimmeringlights"

Shimmering Lights is the fourth studio album by Canadian indie-rock band The Meligrove Band, released September 21, 2010 on vinyl and CD. Nevado Records released the album in Canada, while Last Gang Records released it simultaneously in the United States.

It was rated three out of five stars by Andrew Leahey of AllMusic.

== Track listing ==
=== Side A ===
1. Ghosts At My Back - 3:30
2. Really Want It - 3:14
3. Make Believe It - 3:31
4. White Like Lies - 3:35
5. Halflight - 3:38

=== Side B ===
1. Kingfisher - 2:30
2. Racingtoshimmeringlights - 2:52
3. Bones Attack!! - 2:58
4. This Work - 3:37
5. Eagles - 2:29

== Personnel ==
=== Band ===
- Jason Nunes - singing, guitar, piano, organ
- Darcy Rego - singing, drums, guitar, shakers
- Michael Small - bass guitar, singing

=== Guests ===
- Rich Aucoin - vibraphone on "Bones Attack!!"
- Lily Frost - singing on "This Work"
- Brendan Howlett - trumpet on "Ghosts At My Back"
- Randy Lee - violin on "Make Believe It" and "White Like Lies" and "Racingtoshimmeringlights" and "Bones Attack!!"
- Yoroku Saki - drum samples on "Kingfisher" and "Racingtoshimmeringlights"
- Andrew Scott - trumpet on "Ghosts At My Back" and guitar on "Eagles"
- Drew Smith - singing on the last four songs
- Davina Thomson - singing on the last four songs

== Release Date ==
- September 21, 2010 - Canada and the United States
