= Random Killing =

Canadian punk rock band

- Origin: Toronto, Ontario, Canada
- Genres: Punk rock
- Years active: 1984–present
- Labels: Raw Energy

Random Killing is a Toronto-, Montreal-, and Oshawa-based Canadian punk rock band formed in 1984. The band originated as a group of childhood friends who began playing cover versions of their favourite punk rock songs for recreation. This developed into regular rehearsals, original songwriting, and live performances. The band recorded its debut release, Take Our Flag (1985), a 7-inch EP, and produced a music video for the title track. The video aired on Rogers Cable, Citytv News, and MuchMusic, and won a cash prize at Trinity Square Video.

Following their debut, Random Killing released a series of records and CDs, including This Whole World (1989), Kicked in the Nuts (1990), Welcome (1992), Reissued (1993), Thoughts of Aggression (1994), Urine the 90s Now (1996), and Stranded (1997). The band also released numerous limited-run cassettes, demos, and enhanced CD-ROMs, some of which were available exclusively at live performances. Through Raw Energy Records, Random Killing achieved international distribution via A&M Records, Page Distribution, Black Mark Production, and EMI Records. Their 12-inch record Bring Out Your Dead was released in February 2023 by CursedBlessings Records and its distributors.

In 1995, Random Killing re-recorded their song "12," a punk rock parody of the counting song from Sesame Street, at CBC Studios in Toronto. The recording was released as a series of four animated videos (numbers 2, 3, 4, and 12), which aired internationally on Sesame Street for more than a decade. During the same sessions, the band also recorded an instrumental version of "Johnny Was a Punk," which was later adapted into a video for the letter "J."

In 1998, Random Killing performed and were interviewed live on CTV's Open Mike with Mike Bullard. The interview was unscripted and took place following their performance. Mike Bullard later recounted the appearance in an article published in a major Toronto newspaper, characterizing the band in a humorous manner that contributed to their media exposure.

Random Killing's song "Undertaker" was featured in the documentary Zombiemania, produced for the Space television channel in 2008.

The band have performed across Canada and have shared stages with Canadian and international punk bands including Dayglo Abortions, D.O.A., Propagandhi, SNFU, Forgotten Rebels, Ripcordz, Armed and Hammered, Bunchofuckingoofs, Agnostic Front, Bad Brains, Dead Kennedys, Coffin Break, Submachine, The Restarts, UK Subs, The Vibrators, and GBH.

Random Killing are among the longest continuously active punk bands in Canada and marked their 40th anniversary in 2024.

== Band ==
=== Current members ===
Mudd a.k.a. Jim Moore: Co-Founder, Bass

Rusty Talent a.k.a. John Hajdu: Co-Founder, Guitar

Drool a.k.a. Andrew Kiteley: Lyrics, Vocals

Boneless a.k.a. Chris Hill: Drums

=== Former members ===
John Robert Neilson: Drums

Kevin Low: Vocals

Victor Farkas: Vocals

Tony Mastromatteo: Drums / Vocals

Mike Rosenthal: Drums

Tim Monahan: Drums

Sean Dignan: Drums

Mark Watts: Guitar

Chris Boneless: Touring Guitarist - filled in for Rusty Talent on guitar for a year and a half in the early 2000s while on paternity leave. Current drummer

== Releases ==
- Bring Out Your Dead (Cursed Blessings Records, 2023) 12"
- Stranded (Raw Energy Records, 1997) cd
- Urine the 90s Now (Raw Energy Records, 1996) cd
- Thoughts of Aggression (Raw Energy Records, 1994) cd/tape
- Re-issued (Raw Energy Records, 1993) cd/tape
- Welcome... (Raw Energy Records, 1992) cd/tape
- Kicked in the Nuts (Resistance Records, Switzerland - not the white power US label, 1990) 7"
- This Whole World (Aardvark Records, 1989) 12"
- Take Our Flag (Aardvark Records, 1985) 7"
