= Those Who Sow Sorrow Shall Reap Rage =

Studio album by Brat Attack
- Released: 2008
- Recorded: October 2006–February 2007
- Genre: Punk rock
- Label: Rebel Time Records, 3rd Generation Recordz
- Producer: Brat Attack, Jared Weiss

Brat Attack chronology
From This Beauty Comes Chaos and Mayhem (2005)	Those Who Sow Sorrow Shall Reap Rage (2008)

Professional ratings
Review scores
Source	Rating
CHARTattack	2.5/5 stars
Exclaim	(Favourable)
Uptown magazine	(B+)

Those Who Sow Sorrow Shall Reap Rage is the most recent album by Canadian punk rock band Brat Attack, released in 2008. It is the band's first release on Rebel Time Records. The Brat Attack lineup for this recording is Dave Zegarac, Dustin Jackson, Dave Halcrow and Jeff Tetrault, who was a founding member of the group and appeared on their first two records, One Revolution Per Minute and Destruction Sound System. Former vocalist Chanelle Birks makes a guest appearance on the track "Merchants of Beauty," for which a video was shot. A video was also shot for the song "Spark."

== Track listing ==
1. "Spark"
2. "Selling Revolution"
3. "Hey Harper, You Homophobe Anti-Choice Fuck, Die, Die, Die"
4. "Prison Slave Labour"
5. "Burnt Bridges"
6. "This Police State Causes Urban Genocide"
7. "Let's Entertain the Idea That Your God is Dead"
8. "Merchants of Beauty"
9. "No One Left to Speak Out"
10. "Home-Grown Terrorism"
11. "Lack of Compassion or Just Ignorance?"
12. "The Rise and Fall"
13. "End the Occupation"
14. "This is a Culture of Resistance"
