= The Brat Attack =

Canadian political punk rock band

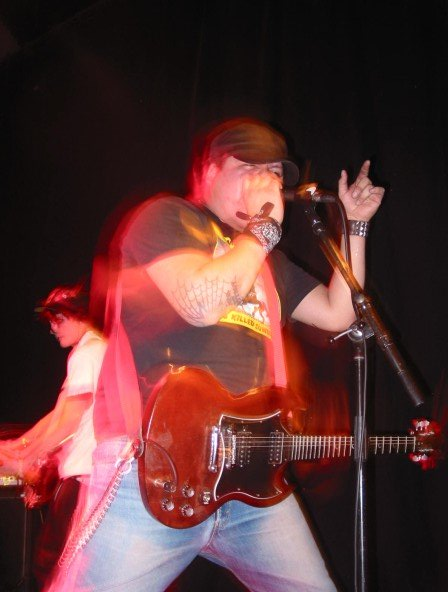
- Dave Zegarac

Background information
- Origin: Winnipeg, Manitoba, Canada
- Genre: Punk rock
- Years active: 2001–2009
- Labels: 3rd Generation Recordz; Steel Capped Records/Longshot Records; Underground Operations; Rebel Time Records
- Past members: Dave Zegarac; Jessica Brown; Ricky Green; Anastasia Chipelski; Jeff Tetrault; Chuck McGee; Seana Wolfe; Darwin Baker; Kent McLeod; Eric Weiss; Santiago Silva; Ben Rodecker; Darryl Reilly; Matt Mayor; Steve Boyd; Johnny Perrin; Adam Mott; Billy Bigford; Chanelle Birks; Megan Doyle; Colin Irvine; Chris Ferguson; Dustin Jackson; Dave Halcrow; Ryan Sanders; Sean Lewis; Danielle Trouble
- Website: http://www.myspace.com/thebratattack

The Brat Attack was a Canadian political punk rock band from Winnipeg, Manitoba. In 2007, their biography (edited) was: "We are a political punk band that believes that we can contribute to creating social change and fighting injustice in singing about various issues that concern us, making the message the focal point, and expose people to our concerns and shit that makes us pissed off and frustrated...We are young and stupid, but believe that we should take this opportunity of singing in front of people to focus on important shit rather than the ho-hum drivel about relationships." The band has fallen into controversies in recent years due to charges on front man, Davey Brat, for distribution of child pornography, as well as a hit and run of protestors.

== History ==
The Brat Attack was founded in 2001 with the line-up of Dave Zegarac (vocals, guitar), Jessica Brown (vocals), Ricky Green (bass), Jeff Tetrault (drums) and Chuck McGee (guitar). Brown and Green left the band and were replaced, on vocals and bass, by Anastasia Chipelski. In 2002, this line-up released their debut album, One Revolution Per Minute. By this time, Zegarac was well known among Winnipeg musicians. This was his fourth band, and his songs were now being covered by other bands. Those older songs constituted half of the content on this album; the new music was recorded in 24 hours. The album was released on Zegarac's label, 3rd Generation Records. Reviews were positive.

The success of One Revolution Per Minute led to a recording contract with Steel Capped Records which, in late 2003, released the band's second album, Destruction Sound System. By now, there had been many personnel changes. Zegarac and Tetrault remained; the rest of the original members had left. For Destruction Sound System, the line-up was vocalist Seana Wolfe, bassist Darwin Baker, drummer Kent McLeod, guitarists Eric Weiss, Santiago Silva and Ben Rodecker and, on saxophone, Darryl Reilly. Destruction Sound System was also successful. Reviews were mixed, but one critic called it "one of the best punk albums to come out of Winnipeg, or anywhere for that matter, in years."

Steel Capped and Brat Attack parted company and Zegarac re-released Destruction Sound System under 3rd Generation Recordz. Underground Operations signed the band in 2005 and released their album, From This Beauty Comes Chaos and Mayhem. The album was produced by Mark Spicoluk and Steve Rizun. For this album, all of the former band members had left and Zegarac put together a new band: Matt Mayor (bass), Steve Boyd (percussion), Johnny Perrin (drums), Adam Mott and Billy Bigford on guitar, and a 17 year-old singer named Chanelle Birks, whose voice caught the attention of critics. Between the album's recording and its release, Mayor had left the band and been replaced by Colin Irvine.

In 2005, the band played the Warped Tour, Edgefest, Canadian Music Week and several shows in Toronto, opening for The Flatliners and Protest the Hero. The band fell apart, and regrouped with the line-up of bassist Dave Halcrow, guitarist Dustin Jackson, drummer Chris Ferguson and Zegarac.

In April 2008, Rebel Time Records signed The Brat Attack and released their album Those Who Sow Sorrow Shall Reap Rage that November. For this album, Tetrault had returned on drums. Birks returned to handle vocals, with Ryan Sanders and Sean Lewis contributing plain speech. The band broke up soon after the release of this album.

In 2010, Brat Attack released, as a digital download, B All You Can B, a collection of the band's B-sides, demos and live recordings.

Of all of the artists who passed through The Brat Attack, few continued with music. Darryl Reilly and Darwin Baker became established with the 'Sub City Dwellers', Santiago Silva co-founded 'Project: Constellation', and Adam Mott went into music management.

In February 2022, Zegarac was charged after he drove his car through a group of protesters at a freedom convoy in downtown Winnipeg. In late 2022, Zegarac was arrested for distributing intimate images without consent, and with child luring and child pornography-related offences.

In September 2024, Zegarac was confirmed dead as a result a fatal vehicular accident. The news was first shared by Zegarac's wife. Zegarac's death was later confirmed by a Winnipeg Punks facebook group post which references confirmation from "...multiple sources including numerous calls to Office of the Chief Medical Examiner..."

== Discography ==
- 2002: One Revolution Per Minute - (3rd Generation Recordz)
- 2003: Destruction Sound System - (Steel Capped Records)
- 2004: Destruction Sound System (2) - (3rd Generation Recordz)
- 2005: From This Beauty Comes Chaos And Mayhem - (Underground Operations)
- 2008: Those Who Sow Sorrow Shall Reap Rage - (Rebel Time Records)
- 2010: B All You Can B - (3rd Generation Recordz)
