= Ian Blackwood =

Canadian actor and musician (born 1982)

- Born: August 12, 1982 (age 44)
- Origin: Burlington, Ontario, Canada
- Genres: punk rock, rock and roll
- Occupations: actor, musician

Ian Blackwood (born August 12, 1982) is a Canadian photographer, musician/producer, and actor known for being the vocalist/guitarist of the now defunct Toronto-based punk rock band The Artist Life, and for playing Kyle Bateman on the CTV teen hit Instant Star. Past musical projects also include the bands The Posts, The Artist Life, and This is the Noise. Blackwood was also a technician for the band, Walk Off The Earth.

Blackwood has been a member of the Alliance of Canadian Cinema, Television and Radio Arts ACTRA for over a decade and has been seen on many television and film productions such as Odd Squad (TVO), Heroes Reborn (NBC), Warehouse 13 (Syfy), Degrassi (CTV/EPITOME) and V Morgan Is Dead (Shaftesbury Films). He has also been featured in many Canadian and American commercial advertisements. He was the face of RBC Royal Bank of Canada for their "Someday" and "Not Business As Usual" campaigns, RBC Brewery Ad, and had a podcast called Ian Blackwood Talks Smack.

He owns a private recording studio called LimeGreen Studio in Mississauga, Ontario, and has written music for CBC and its affiliate kids channel, CBC Kids. He also recorded and mixed Sarah Blackwood's first solo album Way Back Home among other projects.

Blackwood started playing guitar at the age of 11, originally taught by his father Michael Blackwood. He started his first band at age 14. Blackwood grew up in the Greater Toronto Area (905) underground music scene playing in many bands, most notably as a drummer for Jersey, a guitarist for The Fullblast, vocalist and guitarist for The Artist Life, and guitar and backup vocals for Always Outnumbered. Blackwood graduated from Lord Elgin High School (which has since changed its name to Robert Bateman) in June 2000, and attended Capilano University in North Vancouver, British Columbia, but left after one semester of studying film productions/screen writing and acting.

Blackwood is the brother of former The Creepshow lead singer and current Walk Off The Earth member Sarah Blackwood, as well as Jen Blackwood who is also a former vocalist for The Creepshow.
