= Dead Language (album) =

Studio album by the Flatliners
- Released: July 17, 2013
- Genre: Punk rock, melodic hardcore
- Length: 39:32
- Label: Fat
- Producer: Steve Rizun

The Flatliners chronology
Cavalcade (2010)	Dead Language (2013)	Inviting Light (2017)

Professional ratings
Review scores
Source	Rating
AllMusic	3.5/5 stars
PopMatters	6/10 stars
Punknews	3.5/5 stars

Dead Language is the fourth studio album by Canadian punk band the Flatliners. It was released in 2013 on Fat Wreck Chords. The band released the album for streaming shortly before its release. The album was subsequently nominated for "Metal/Hard Music Album of the Year" at the Juno Awards of 2014.

== Track listing ==
No.	Title	Length
1.	"Resuscitation of the Year"	3:22
2.	"Bury Me"	2:43
3.	"Birds of England"	3:14
4.	"Drown in Blood"	3:21
5.	"Sew My Mouth Shut"	3:15
6.	"Caskets Full"	2:48
7.	"Ashes Away"	4:07
8.	"Hounds"	3:13
9.	"Dead Hands"	1:57
10.	"Quitters"	2:03
11.	"Tail Feathers"	4:03
12.	"Young Professionals"	1:59
13.	"Brilliant Resilience"	3:27

== Personnel ==
Musicians

- Chris Cresswell – composer, guitar, vocals
- Scott Brigham – guitar, vocals
- Jon Darbey – bass, vocals
- Paul Ramirez – drums
- Michael Liorti – keyboards

Production

- The Flatliners – producer
- Steve Rizun – producer, engineer, mixer
- Reiss Zurbyk – assistant engineer
- Michael Liorti – assistant engineer
- Harry Hess – mastering

Artwork

- Richard Minino – art director
- Gilda Louise Aloisi – photography
- John Meloche – layout
