= The Meligrove Band =

Canadian indie rock band

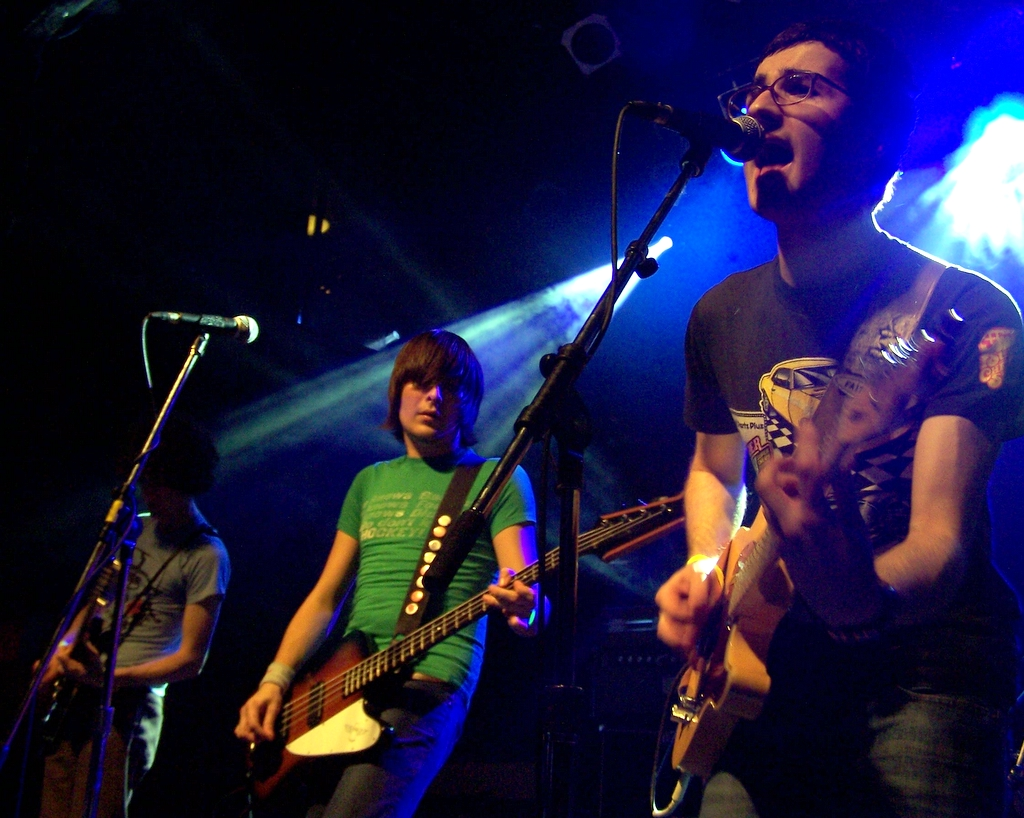
- The Meligrove Band, January 2006

Background information
- Origin: Mississauga, Ontario, Canada
- Genre: Indie rock
- Years active: 1997–2017
- Labels: Last Gang, Nevado Records, V2, We Are Busy Bodies, Endearing, Ductape
- Members: Jason Nunes; Darcy Rego; Michael Small; Brian O'Reilly
- Past members: Rick Gomes; Andrew Scott
- Website: meligroveband.com

The Meligrove Band is a Canadian indie rock band, based in Toronto, and consisting of Jason Nunes on vocals, guitar and piano, Darcy Rego on vocals and drums, Brian O'Reilly on guitar and synthesizer, and Michael Small on bass guitar.

== History ==
The band was formed in 1997 in Mississauga by Nunes, Small and Rego, when the three attended Father Michael Goetz Secondary School in Mississauga. Their first public performance was in March 1998 at Club Shanghai in Toronto. The band pressed a demo cassette in May 1998, and its first album, Stars & Guitars, was released by Ductape Records in April 2000.

Original drummer Rick Gomes departed in June 2001, and the band stayed a trio (with singer-guitarist Rego permanently moving to drums) until the release of their second album, Let It Grow on Endearing Records in October 2002. The album showed a move to a more orchestrated sound.

Andrew Scott joined in October 2002, months before his former band, Femme Fatale, ceased touring. Scott's bandmates in Femme Fatale included Sebastien Grainger and Jesse F. Keeler, who later played together as Death from Above 1979. Although the Meligrove Band's sound has been compared to Sloan by some Canadian critics, Scott is not the same person as Sloan's Andrew Scott. His last show as a member of the band was in September 2007 in London, but he has occasionally appeared with them as a guest since.

In 2003, Nunes, Small and Rego appeared in Joel Plaskett Emergency's "Come On Teacher" music video, playing Plaskett's high school posse. In 2004, the band appeared as themselves on an episode of the teen comedy Radio Free Roscoe.

In early 2005, Small played briefly with Jessie Stein and Owen Pallett in SS Cardiacs, a predecessor band of The Luyas.

In summer 2005, The Meligrove Band became the first Canadian group signed to V2 Records. In 2006, the label released their album Planets Conspire in the United Kingdom, Canada, Taiwan, Scandinavia, and Finland. Planets Conspire was featured as Rough Trade Shops' Album of the Month for April 2006, and in Canada it reached No. 2 on the national campus radio chart. That year the band toured in western Canada.

The band's 2010 album, Shimmering Lights, was released in September 2010 by Nevado Records in Canada and Last Gang Records in the United States, and reached No. 1 on CBC Radio 3 in late October. The album also appeared on the !Earshot National Top 50 Chart.

A documentary entitled Ages & Stages: The Story of the Meligrove Band was released in the summer of 2012. The film includes interviews with about 40 other Canadian bands and music industry personalities including Joel Plaskett, Tokyo Police Club, Born Ruffians, Fucked Up, The Arkells, The Most Serene Republic, and Sebastien Grainger.

The Meligrove Band song "Bones Attack!!" was used as the theme song for television show The Basketball Jones.

Their fifth album, Bones of Things, was released in November, 2014.

The band took a break from touring in 2015, and played their last performance at Lee's Palace in Toronto in November, 2017.

== Discography ==
=== Albums ===
- 2000 - Stars & Guitars (Ductape Records)
- 2002 - Let It Grow (Endearing Records)
- 2006 - Planets Conspire (V2 Records /[We Are Busy Bodies)
- 2010 - Shimmering Lights (Last Gang Records / Nevado Records)
- 2014 - Bones of Things (We Are Busy Bodies)

=== 7" Singles ===
- 2006: "Everyone's a Winner" b/w "Kingfisher Demo" (V2 Records; United Kingdom only)
- 2010: "Halflight" b/w "Super VGF" (Nevado Records; Canada only)

=== EPs ===
- 2013: Remixes I: Stay Hard (independent)

=== Cassettes ===
- 1998: The Meligrove Band EP (independent)

=== Compilation appearances ===
- 1999: Music to Fall Asleep By (Ductape Records)
- 2001: Songs in Motion (Hasil Records)
- 2003: Underpin Collective No. 1 (Underpin Collective)
- 2003: Recordings from CKLN's Wired for Sound, 2001-2002 (My Mean Magpie)
- 2003: Food for Thought vol. 1 (The Food and Shelter Project)
- 2004: Function Magazine (Ryerson University School of Image Arts)
- 2005: Queen Aritzia (M1 Group)
- 2006: Doormat Records Remembers the Low-Five (Doormat Records)
- 2006: Brit Rock Best (a collection of V2 Records artists, released in South Korea only)
- 2007: Friends in Bellwoods (Out of This Spark)
- 2007: Everything's Gone Green original soundtrack (Lakeshore Records)
- 2008: Songs for the Gang: Thrush Hermit Tribute (Gooseberry Records)
- 2011: Last Gang Records: The Collector's Edition, Volume 7 (Last Gang Records)
