= Number 9 Audio Group =

Number 9 Audio Group is a recording studio located in the Cabbagetown area of Toronto, Ontario, Canada, at 222 Gerrard Street East. Number 9 produced the World Jazz For Haiti charity album in 2010, appeared on Much Music's Disband TV show in 2008, and recorded Canadian acts Barenaked Ladies and Amanda Marshall in the 1990s, while they were still emerging artists.

== History ==
Number 9 Audio Group was founded in 1981 by George Rondina, who continues to operate the studio to this day. The title of the studio is a nod towards the Beatles' Revolution 9. The recording studio is currently housed with a renovated Victorian building, featuring two live rooms, a single control room and small production lab. In 2010, Number 9 Audio Group was profiled by Canadian Musician magazine due to its long history in the Canadian music industry.

=== Beginnings (Number 9 Sound Studios) ===
After touring extensively as a keyboardist during the 1970s, George Rondina decided to make a career change to producer/engineer. He took $500 of his savings and opened up the first incarnation of Number 9 Sound Studios in the back of a local record shop. The studio grew quickly and took on a variety of clients from the Toronto area.

As business picked up, George formed a partnership with Jim Zolis to further grow the studio. They switched locations to a basement studio on Jarvis street in Toronto, in order to better serve their increasingly metropolitan clients. Throughout the 1980s and 1990s Number 9 welcomed artists such as Jane Siberry, Amanda Marshall, the Nylons, the Waltons, Barenaked Ladies and Jeff Healey through their doors.

=== Number 9 Audio Group ===
Although the studio had gained great popularity by the mid 1990s - earning multiple Juno Awards and Gold Records - the two partners decided to go their separate ways in 1996. George went on to build the business that is now known as Number 9 Audio Group, while Jim founded his own company entitled Zolis Audio Productions.

The business continued to flourish throughout the 1990s and 2000s, working with an eclectic mix of clients including Van Morrison, Duran Duran and the Rolling Stones. In 2006 the studio moved into a new location; a renovated Victorian home in the core of downtown Toronto, which it occupies to this day.

=== disBAND ===
On Monday August 25, 2009, Much Music came to Number 9 to film an episode of their popular show disBAND. The featured band for the episode was pop duo Karamel, who recorded with head engineer Bernie Cisternas with the assistance of Treble Charger frontman Greg Nori. Although the recording session was a success, Karamel received a "thumbs down" from the disBand jury at the episode's climax.

=== World Jazz For Haiti ===
Following the 2010 Haiti earthquake, George Rondina worked in tandem with producer/musician George Koller to produce the World Jazz For Haiti charity album. Over the course of six months the duo recorded a variety of Canadian talent at Number 9 Audio Group, including John McDermott, Holly Cole, David Clayton-Thomas and many more. After months of work the album was released at a fundraiser event at Hugh's Room in Toronto. All profits from the album sales and release party went towards the Red Cross' disaster relief fund.

=== Present Day ===
Number 9 Audio Group continues to operate as a full-service recording studio to this day. Asides from the usual audio activities, the studio works towards promoting its charity projects and diversifying its client base.
