= We Re-Built This City =

EP by Closet Monster
- Released: 2004
- Studio: Elk Studios, Stuttgart, on February 7 and March 7, 2003; Parkhill Studios, Oakville, for six days in January–February 2004
- Label: Underground Operations
- Producer: Closet Monster

Closet Monster chronology
Killed The Radio Star (2002)	We Re-Built This City (2004)

We Re-Built This City is the second and final EP by the Canadian punk rock band Closet Monster. Released in 2004, "Mamma Anti-Fascisto (Never Surrender)" and "Punk Rock Ruined Our Lives" were the two singles taken from the project.

The first version of this EP was titled We Built This City, released in 2004 on CD by Underground Operations, but it suffered from audio problems. It was remixed, remastered and retitled to become We Re-Built This City with different artwork, released later in 2004 on the same label. Exclaim! magazine praised the improvements in sound quality and the "overwhelming gang vocals permeating every single track" which dramatically strengthened the song "The Empire Strikes Iraq".

Canadian Musician noted that the video for the single "Mamma Anti-Fascisto (Never Surrender)" received "medium rotation on MuchMusic." The song was written in 2003 in Italy during a difficult time for the band who were inspired to keep going after talking to an older woman left-wing activist who said, "never surrender."

== Track listing ==
1. "Mamma Anti-Fascisto (Never Surrender)"
2. "Convictions Of A Schoolyard Anarchist"
3. "Punk Rock Ruined Our Lives"
4. "Shitting In The Face Of This Western Disgrace"
5. "The Empire Strikes Iraq"
6. "Open Scene, Open Arms: Your Application Is Denied"
7. "Summer Of '97"
