= Rob Moir =

Canadian songwriter

Robert Daniel Moir, known as Rob Moir, is a Canadian songwriter, guitarist, poet, and singer.

== Early life and education ==
Moir was born and raised in Toronto, Ontario.

== Career ==
Moir began writing and performing music in his early teens. His first band The Stiffs began playing shows in 1995. After renaming themselves Dead Letter Dept., the band released their debut full length Rock'n'Roll Hates You in 2005 and participated in Underground Operations' Unity Tour.

Following the break up of Dead Letter Dept., Moir began touring and writing personal, acoustic based songs. In December 2010, he independently released his first solo EP entitled This Is The Lie with backing band The Great Lates. In support of this album he toured North America and Europe with his guitar and a backpack.

Moir performed at the Toronto NXNE Festival. He began preparing his first solo album, Places To Die, which was released on April 30, 2013, on Northern Americas and Underground Operations. The album contains tracks from several genres, and has received positive reviews. In 2013, Rob toured Europe, Australia, and North America to support the album.

In 2014 and 2015, Moir continued to write songs and to perform as a solo singer-songwriter, making the rounds of clubs and bars.

In 2015, Moir released the album Adventure Handbook with songs inspired by his world travels.

== Discography ==
- Rock'n'Roll Hates You 2005
- This Is The Lie 2010
- Places to Die, 2013
- Adventure Handbook 2015
