= I Hate Sally =

Canadian musical group

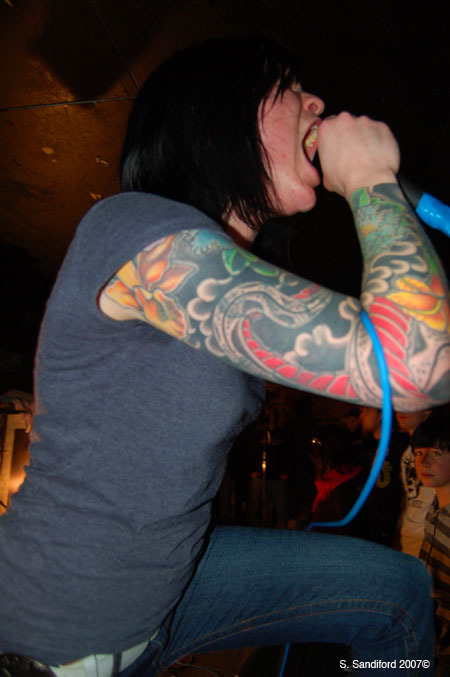
- Dee Prescott

Background information
- Origin: Kingston, Ontario, Canada
- Years active: 2000–2008
- Labels: Underground Operations; Vagrant Records
- Past members: Dee Prescott; Marc Garniss; Dan Vokey; Mark McGee; Kelly Payne; Geoff Bergsma; Kevin Brezina; Ben Thomas; Nick Stecz

I Hate Sally was a heavy metal/post-hardcore band from Ontario, Canada. It was formed in 2000, in Kingston, Ontario, by Marc Garniss, Ben Thomas, and Kelly Payne.

== Biography ==
After numerous line-up changes the band finally had a consistent and solid line-up, this being Marc Garniss, Ben Thomas, Nick Stecz, and Dan Vokey. With this line-up they started touring and writing songs that would later be released on I Hate Sally's 2004 debut Sickness of the Ages. 2005 brought the return of former bassist Dee Prescott back on for vocal duties. With Dee in the line-up, I Hate Sally began recording an EP entitled The Plague which was also released in 2005. In late 2005, Ben Thomas left the band after having issues with the band members. After Ben's departure, I Hate Sally considered starting a new band with the 4 remaining members, but instead decided to continue on as a four-piece I Hate Sally.

In the spring of 2006, Don't Worry Lady was recorded, and after its completion drummer Nick Stecz left the band to pursue other options; he was replaced by Mark McGee. Toronto-based label Underground Operations signed I Hate Sally in the fall of 2006 and this was followed by the long-awaited release of Don't Worry Lady. Vagrant/Density Records signed the band and released Don't Worry Lady in the US on June 12, 2007, and on October 1, 2007, in the UK. On December 11, 2007, I Hate Sally and Quebec metal band GFK joined forces to release a 6-song split EP. On July 10, 2008, the band officially announced that they had disbanded permanently.

== Influences ==
Though the band's genre leans towards metalcore music, Dee Prescott has stated her favorite genre of music as being punk rock and expressed an interest in collaboration with Beth Ditto from The Gossip. Each member of the band had different musical tastes and the overall inspiration for writing within I Hate Sally came from life in general more than from other bands.

== Band members ==
Final lineup

- Marc Garniss – guitars, backing vocals (2000–2008)
- Dee Prescott – vocals (2005–2008) bass (2002)
- Dan Vokey – bass, backing vocals (2003–2008)
- Mark McGee – drums (2006–2008)

Former

- Kelly Payne – drums (2000–2001)
- Geoff Bergsma – drums (2002)
- Kevin Brezina – bass (2003)
- Ben Thomas – guitar, vocals (2000–2005)
- Nick Stecz – drums (2002–2006)

== Discography ==
Studio albums:

- Sickness of the Ages (2004)
- Don't Worry Lady (2006)

EPs:

- The Plague (2005)
- I Hate Sally Vs GFK: Sp(l)it EP (2007)

=== Videography ===
- Live from the Woods Behind Your House DVD (2005)
- Clean Up the Blood music video from The Plague EP (2005)
- Bathsheba of Seven music video from Don't Worry Lady (2006)
- Hannah Hannah music video from Don't Worry Lady (2006)
- Martha Served music video from Don't Worry Lady (2007)
