= A Fight for What Is Right =

Studio album by Closet Monster
- Released: 1999
- Genre: Punk rock
- Label: Underground Operations
- Producer: Closet Monster

Closet Monster chronology
Pure Unfiltered Anarchy (1998)	A Fight for What Is Right (1999)	Where The Fuck Is Revolution? (2000)

A Fight for What Is Right was the third album by Canadian punk rock band Closet Monster, released in 1999.

== Track listing ==
1. "Uniqualist Me"
2. "I Have No Mouth but I Must Scream"
3. "Counter Clockwise"
4. "Friday Night"
5. "Higher Education"
6. "One Capitalist Always Kills Many (Fat Cats)"
7. "Prison of Your Mind"
8. "Nausea"
9. "One Word"
10. "Heart Strings"
11. "Starving"
12. "A Revolutionary Dream"
13. "Suburbia"
14. "Common Devotion"
