= Machete Avenue =

- Also known as: Chad Michael Stewart
- Origin: London, Ontario, Canada
- Genres: Indie rock Acoustic
- Years active: 2005–present
- Labels: Underground Operations/Universal Music Canada
- Members: Chad Michael Stewart; Scotty Parker
- Website: macheteavenue.com

Machete Avenue is a Canadian indie rock duo from London, Ontario, composed of lead vocalist Chad Michael Stewart and keyboardist Scott Parker.

== History ==
Stewart, from St. Thomas, Ontario, and Parker, from London, Ontario (also known as Scotty Scheid), formed Machete Avenue in 2005. They began performing in London and in the Toronto area, and later that year the pair released an EP, The First Cuts. The tracks consisted of vocals, keyboard and acoustic guitar.

Machete Avenue took part in Guelph's Wakestock festival in 2007, and won London Music Awards in 2007 and 2008. A second album, Machete Avenue, was released in 2008. Percussionist, Vince Jerzy, joined the group in 2008. The band performed and recorded together until early 2009, after which Stewart continued to perform alone under the name Machete Avenue.

== Discography ==
- The First Cuts EP (Conquer the World Records 2005, Underground Operations re-issue 2006)
- Machete Avenue Album. (2008)

=== Singles ===
- "The Capsule"
- "Cut To Pieces"
- "Hollow"

=== Videos ===
- "Cut To Pieces" from the album The First Cuts (2005)
- "Hollow" from the album Machete Avenue (2008)

== See also ==
- List of bands from Canada
