= Killed the Radio Star =

Killed The Radio Star

Studio album by Closet Monster
- Released: July 18, 2002
- Genre: Punk rock
- Label: Underground Operations
- Producer: Closet Monster

Closet Monster chronology
Where the Fuck is Revolution? (2000)	Killed The Radio Star (2002)	We Rebuilt This City (2004)

Killed the Radio Star is the fifth album by the Canadian punk rock band Closet Monster, released in 2002.

== Track listing ==
1. "Battle Cry for a Better World"
2. "Mr. Holland vs. Acceptable Behavior"
3. "The Great Mall Explosion"
4. "Sexism Is Real: Wrestling Is Not"
5. "Corporate Media Death Squad"
6. "Romanticism and the Fat Man"
7. "Yes, This Is a Guilt Trip"
8. "The Anti-Racist Sing-a-Long"
9. "Smells Like Revolutionary Spirit"
10. "Playground"
11. "Melody's Song"
12. "Plummet of the Americas"
