= The Holly Springs Disaster =

Canadian metalcore band

- Also known as: THSD
- Origin: Moose Jaw, Saskatchewan, Canada
- Genres: Metalcore, southern metal
- Years active: 2006–2010; 2014
- Label: Underground Operations
- Past members: Michael Froh; Josh Guillaume; Tony Davalos; Andy Foord; Dan Marranca
- Website: thehollyspringsdisaster

The Holly Springs Disaster was a Canadian metalcore band formed in 2005 in Moose Jaw, Saskatchewan.

== History ==
They toured Canada numerous times to support their self-released eponymous EP (colloquially known as The Home Alone EP) before collaborating with producer Zach Ohren to record their second EP, Motion Sickness Love. The release was issued on September 18, 2007, by Canadian record label Underground Operations. After the release, THSD did a cross-country tour (Tour and Loathing) with Protest the Hero and All That Remains. Tour and Loathing marked the band's first time stopping to play east coast dates.

The Holly Springs Disaster later debuted new material when they played The Reverb during Canadian Music Week 2008. At the end of 2008, the band supported Cancer Bats on their Canadian dates and in early 2009 the Holly Springs Disaster headlined dates across Canada with A Textbook Tragedy, Baptized in Blood, Sights & Sounds and more.

=== Departure of Michael Froh ===
On April 6, 2009, the band posted a blog on their MySpace page saying that the lead singer, Mike, had decided to leave the band he did not have the same goals for the band as the rest of them.

It has also been stated in a blog on his personal MySpace that other factors, such as health issues, and a loss of confidence in the record industry caused him to leave the group.

The band spent some time looking for a replacement and recorded some instrumental songs that they've put up on their MySpace.

=== Break-up ===
The band announced their break-up and played a final farewell tour across Canada in the summer of 2010 with Structures and Architects.

The band posted to their Facebook on July 23, 2014, that they would return in 2014. Three days later, they announced a reunion show in Toronto, Ontario, for December 19 and 20 at the Danforth Music Hall with supporting bands Structures (19th/20th), Ritual ex. Dead and Divine (19th), and Exalt (20th).

== Band members ==
=== Final lineup ===
- Michael Froh - lead vocals, keyboards (2005–2009; 2010; 2014)
- Josh Guillaume - guitar, backing vocals (2005–2010; 2014)
- Tony Davalos - guitar, backing vocals (2005–2010; 2014)
- Andy Foord - bass (2005–2010; 2014)
- Dan Marranca - drums (2007–2010; 2014)

=== Former ===
- Joel Hansen - drums (2005–2007)

== Discography ==
=== EPs ===
- The Holly Springs Disaster (2005, a.k.a. The Home Alone EP)
- Motion Sickness Love (2007)

=== Other ===
- King Kong (instrumental)
- Road Rash (instrumental)

=== Videography ===
- "Up in Smoke", music video from Motion Sickness Love (2007)
