= Raw Energy Records =

Canadian independent record label

- Founded: 1989
- Founder: Graeme Boyce
- Status: reinvigorated for the modern era.
- Distributors: A&M Records (Canada) & Black Mark (Global)
- Genre: punk, ska
- Country of origin: Canada
- Location: Toronto, Ontario

Raw Energy Records was a Canadian independent record label, based in Toronto, Ontario, Canada. The music label was established in the late 1980s by founder entrepreneur and music journalist Graeme Boyce, initially to distribute the debut EP by King Apparatus, Loud Party. Prior to launching Raw Energy, Boyce was a staff writer for RPM.

The label subsequently released King Apparatus' full-length debut album in 1990; after selling over 5,000 copies of the album in just a handful of record stores in downtown Toronto, the label secured a national distribution deal with A&M Records. The company expanded over the years, and launched new divisions to manage growth, such as Raw Energy Promotions and Raw Energy Radio.

Canadian artists who released Raw Energy albums included King Apparatus, King Cobb Steelie, Dinner Is Ruined, Random Killing, Trunk, Marilyn's Vitamins, Five Knuckle Chuckle, Three Impotent Males, Throbbin‘ Hoods, Out of Hand, Cut Off, Double Standard, DNS, and Sectorseven. Raw Energy also released product from two U.S. acts, The Toasters and Rosie O'Shea. Grouped into the alternative genre, augmenting its roster of punk and ska, the label released a rap album from Top Secret and a noise album from Space City USA.

== Discography ==
| Band | Release Title | Format(s) | Date |
|---|---|---|---|
| All Good Children | All Good Children | Cass/CD | 1992 |
| The Toasters | New York Fever | Cass/CD | 1992 |
| Various/Compilation | On The Road | Cass/CD | 1993 |
| King Apparatus | Marbles | Cass/CD | 1993 |
| King Apparatus | Hospital Waiting Room | CD/EP | 1993 |
| Haze | Book of Shadows | Cass/CD | 1993 |
| King Cobb Steelie | King Cobb Steelie | Cass/CD | 1993 |
| King Cobb Steelie | You Said A Mouthful | CD/EP | 1993 |
| Top Secret | It Ain’t Over | Cass/CD | 1993 |
| Dinner Is Ruined | Love Songs… | Cass/CD | 1993 |
| Various/Compilation | Dead On The Road | Cass/CD | 1993 |
| Mundane | Seed | Cass/CD | 1993 |
| Random Killing | Thoughts of Aggression | Cass/CD | 1994 |
| Throbbin’ Hoods | Ambush | Cass/CD | 1994 |
| Satanatras | Eight Ate Hate | Cass/CD | 1994 |
| Rosie O’Shea | Practicing Silence | Cass/CD | 1994 |
| Trigger Happy | Killatron 2000 | Cass/CD | 1994 |
| Various/Compilation | On The Road in NYC | CD | 1994 |
| Center Za Dehumanizacijo | On The Red Screen | 7” Vinyl | 1994 |
| Five Knuckle Chuckle | Charliee Horse | CD | 1995 |
| Trunk | Beaned Up Polkas | CD | 1996 |
| Throbbin’ Hoods | Hot Live Action | CD | 1996 |
| Three Impotent Males | Three Impotent Males | CD | 1996 |
| Random Killing | Urine The 90s Now | CD | 1996 |
| Marilyn’s Vitamins | In These Shoes | CD | 1996 |
| The Tirekickers | Smedication | CD | 1996 |
| Space City USA | Chromed | CD | 1997 |
| Jersey | No Turning Back | CD | 1997 |
| Out Of Hand | Canadian Gothic | CD | 1997 |
| Random Killing | Stranded | CD | 1997 |
| Five Knuckle Chuckle | All Hammed Up | CD | 1997 |
| Toe To Toe | Tao | CD | 1997 |
| Various/Compilation | On The Road Again | CD | 1997 |
| Trunk | Throwin’ The Horns | CD | 1998 |
| Marilyn’s Vitamins | Politics On The Dance Floor | CD | 1998 |
| Cutoff | Makin’ Breakfast | CD | 1998 |
| Various/Compilation | Twentybandcomp | CD | 1998 |
| Jersey/Outspan | In Friends We Trust | CD/EP | 1998 |
| Marilyn’s Vitamins | Squeegee Girl | 7” Vinyl | 1998 |
| Double Standard | Dig That Trash | CD | 1999 |
| Various/Compilation | On The Road With a Snowboard | CD | 1999 |
| Sector Seven | Along The Way | CD | 1999 |
| DNS | Idle Time | CD | 1999 |
| No Connection | Toe Tappin’ Fun | CD | 1999 |
| Racer | Analytical Observations Of Unnecessity | CD | 1999 |
| Out Of Hand | Reserection | CD | 1999 |
| Various/Compilation | On The Road To Amsterdam | Promotional CD | 1999 |

== Compilation albums ==
Raw Energy

Compilation album by Various Artists
- Released: 1993
- Genre: Alternative rock
- Label: Raw Energy Records

In 1993, Raw Energy released its first compilation, simply titled Raw Energy. Because of the cartoon drawing used on the cover, it quickly took on the name On the Road within the hardcore community. Raw Energy played on this to release a series of "On the Road" compilations, featuring unsigned and emerging Canadian punk, hardcore and alternative rock bands du jour. Some would end up signing with Raw Energy.

The series of "On the Road" compilations includes:

- Raw Energy (aka On the Road, 1993)
- On the Road Again (1994)
- Dead on the Road: Songs Without Keyboards (1994)
- On the Road to New York City (1994)
- On the Road to Amsterdam (1999)
- On the Road... with a Snowboard (1999)

Other compilations include Twentybandcomp, co-released with Shock Records in Australia.

=== Track listing ===
1. The Dinner Is Ruined, "Stuck Pig"
2. Groovy Religion, "Wanda"
3. hHead, "Collide"
4. King Cobb Steelie, "One's a Heifer"
5. The Imagineers, "This is Nevada Calling"
6. Jale, "I Lied"
7. Cottage Industry, "Theme from Superstar"
8. Yeti, "The Crossing"
9. Wooden Stars, "Hate Everyone"
10. Wining Dining and Drilling, "Captain's a Wreck"
11. Deadbeat Backbone, "Til I'm Gone"
12. Eric's Trip, "Understanding"
13. Change of Heart, "Stress Monkey"

== See also ==
- List of record labels
