= Planets Conspire =

Studio album by The Meligrove Band
- Released: January 17, 2006
- Recorded: 2004–2005
- Genre: Rock
- Length: 42:26
- Labels: V2 Records; We Are Busy Bodies
- Producer: José Miguel Contreras

The Meligrove Band chronology
Let It Grow (2002)	Planets Conspire (2006)	Shimmering Lights (2010)

Singles from Planets Conspire
- 1. "Everyone's A Winner"; 2. "Our Love Will Make The World Go Round"

Planets Conspire is a 2006 album by The Meligrove Band. Released January 17, 2006 in Canada, Planets Conspire is their third studio album, and their first with V2 Records (the Canadian vinyl edition was released by indie label We Are Busy Bodies). The album features Jason Nunes on vocals, piano, guitar and organ, Andrew Scott on guitar, organ and brass, Michael Small on bass and Darcy Rego on drums and acoustic guitar.

Planets Conspire was featured as Rough Trade Shops' Album of the Month in April 2006, and in Canada it reached #2 on the national campus radio chart.

The album was remastered and reissued as a double vinyl LP in November 2017.

== Track listing ==
All songs written by Jason Nunes, except where noted.

=== Side A ===
1. "Isle of Yew" – 3:38
2. "Planets Conspire" – 3:52
3. "Grasshoppers in Honey" – 3:48
4. "Everyone's a Winner" – 3:37
5. "Feversleep" – 1:07

=== Side B ===
6. "Ages & Stages" – 2:14
7. "Our Love Will Make the World Go Round" – 3:21
8. "I'm Easy" (Nunes, Darcy Rego) – 4:09
9. "Free on the Air" (Rego) – 2:41
10. "You're Alive" – 4:12
11. "Delivered from All Blindness of Heart" – 4:34

== Personnel ==
=== Band ===
- Jason Nunes - vocals, guitar, piano, organ
- Darcy Rego - vocals, drums, acoustic guitar
- Andrew Scott - guitar, organ, horns
- Michael Small - bass guitar, vocals

=== Guests ===
- Matt Beckett - whistling
- José Contreras - additional sounds
- Lily Frost - vocals
- Randy Lee - strings
- Yoroku Saki - synthesizer
- Drew Smith - guitar
- Jessie Stein - vocals
- Davina Thomson - clarinet

== Release history ==
- January 17, 2006 - Canada
- August 14, 2006 - United Kingdom
- October 11, 2006 - Scandinavia and Finland
