= Underground Operations =

Canadian independent record label

- Founded: 1995
- Founder: Mark Spicoluk
- Defunct: 2016
- Status: Defunct
- Distributor: Universal Music Group
- Genre: Punk, metalcore, post-hardcore
- Country of origin: Canada
- Location: Toronto, Ontario
- Official website: undergroundoperations.com

Underground Operations was an independent punk rock record label based in Toronto, Ontario, Canada. Established in 1995, the label was originally based in Ajax, Ontario. Operated by Mark Spicoluk, former Closet Monster member and former bass player for Avril Lavigne, this label was one of the most successful independent labels in Canada. Spicoluk started the label when he was 16 years of age. Underground Operations shut down on December 2, 2016.

== Bands ==
- Abandon All Ships
- The Artist Life
- Aspirations
- Bombs Over Providence
- Closet Monster
- Chad Michael Stewart/Machete Avenue
- Dead Letter Dept
- Dean Lickyer
- Diemonds
- Hands & Teeth
- Heart Attack Kids
- The Holly Springs Disaster
- Hostage Life
- I Hate Sally
- Kathleen Turner Overdrive
- Kingdoms
- Lights
- Marilyn's Vitamins
- Means
- Protest the Hero
- Rob Moir
- Skynet
- These Silhouettes

== Discography ==
- 1999: Closet Monster – A Fight for What Is Right
- 2000: Closet Monster – Where the Fuck Is Revolution?
- 2002: Protest the Hero – Search for the Truth EP
- 2002: (coles) Notes From The Underground compilation
- 2002: Closet Monster – Killed the Radio Star
- 2003: Marilyn's Vitamins – Vans Don't Run On Love And Records Aren't Pressed With Smiles
- 2003: Bombs Over Providence – Liberty's Ugly Best Friend
- 2003: Protest the Hero – A Calculated Use of Sound EP
- 2004: Hostage Life – Sing for the Enemy EP
- 2004: Closet Monster – We Re-Built This City
- 2004: Greetings from the Underground compilation
- 2005: The Power of Music compilation
- 2005: Dead Letter Dept. – Rock N' Roll Hates You
- 2005: The Brat Attack – From This Beauty Comes Chaos And Mayhem
- 2005: Bombs Over Providence – Shake Your Body Politic
- 2005: Summer 2005 Sampler compilation
- 2005: Protest the Hero – Kezia
- 2006: Machete Avenue – The First Cuts
- 2006: I Hate Sally – Don't Worry Lady
- 2006: Hostage Life – Walking Papers LP
- 2007: Summer 2007 Sampler compilation
- 2007: The Holly Springs Disaster – Motion Sickness Love
- 2007: I Hate Sally vs. GFK – Sp(l)it EP
- 2007: These Silhouettes – The Thomas EP EP
- 2008: Summer 2008 Sampler compilation
- 2008: Chad Michael Stewart – Machete Avenue
- 2008: Dean Lickyer – Dean Lickyer
- 2008: Means – To Keep Me from Sinking
- 2008: Protest the Hero – Fortress
- 2008: Lights – Lights EP
- 2008: Aspirations – EP! EP
- 2008: The Artist Life – Let's Start a Riot EP
- 2008: Kathleen Turner Overdrive – Marauders!Wolves!Scavengers!Party!
- 2009: Kingdoms – Daughters of Atlas EP
- 2009: Protest the Hero – Gallop Meets the Earth
- 2009: The Artist Life – Let's Start a Campfire EP
- 2010: Abandon All Ships – Geeving
- 2011: Protest the Hero – Scurrilous
- 2011: The Artist Life – Impossible
- 2012: DVBBS – Initio
- 2012: Abandon All Ships – Infamous
- 2012: Diemonds – The Bad Pack
- 2013: Rob Moir – Places to Die
- 2013: Skynet – The Wild EP
- 2014: Abandon All Ships – Malocchio
- 2014: Hands & Teeth – Before the Light EP
- 2014: Underground Operations / Cloud Empire 2014 Sampler compilation
- 2014: Hands & Teeth – Digital 7" EP
- 2015: Diemonds – Never Wanna Die
- 2015: Rob Moir – Adventure Handbook
- 2016: Heart Attack Kids – No Future
- 2016: Closet Monster – Suicide Note compilation

== See also ==
- List of record labels
