= See Spot Run (band) =

Canadian rock band

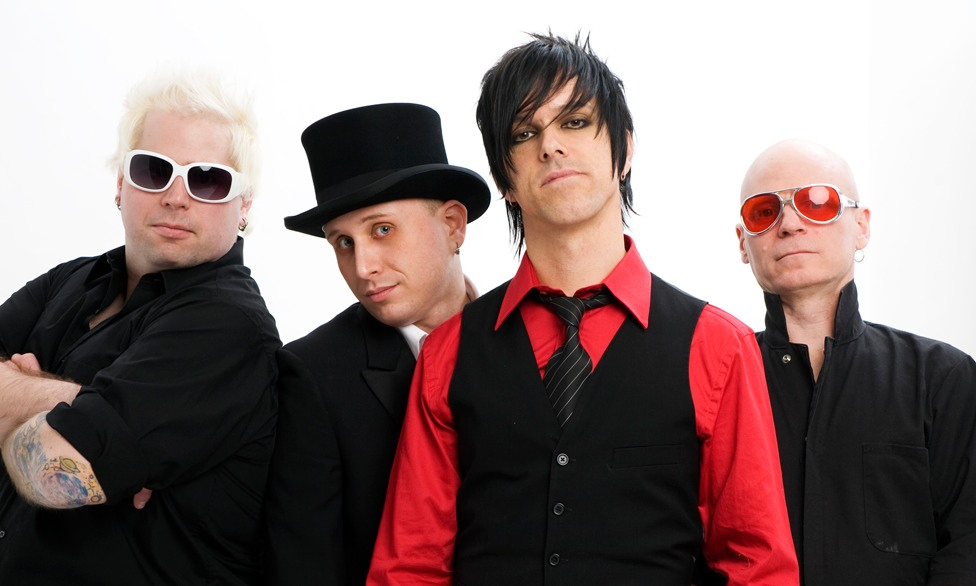

Background information
- Origin: Montreal, Quebec, Canada
- Genres: Rock, alternative rock
- Years active: 1997–present
- Label: Rocket9 Music
- Members: Chris Brodbeck; Aaron Little; Dave Fudge; Randy Bowen
- Past members: Bruce McQueen; Shawn Davis; Reggie Bennett; Bryan Duffy; Mark Homer; Josh Trager; Justin Bunn; Paul Moore
- Website: seespotrun.ca

See Spot Run is a Canadian rock band from Montreal, Quebec.

== History ==
=== Early years: Ten Stories High and Weightless ===
See Spot Run released an EP titled Traces in 1993. Their first full-length album, Ten Stories High, was released in 1997 on DEP/Universal.

The band gained success with "Weightless", the title track and lead single from their second full-length album which reached No. 9 on the BDSrock chart, No. 6 on the top 40 chart, and No. 5 on the all Canadian chart. The song was certified by Neilson BDSradio as the highest charted independent song on the rock chart since the inception of BDS". It also received the "Breakout Single of The Year Award" by the Canadian Association of Broadcasters. The band also won the "Concert of the Year Award" from Wire Magazine shortly after.

=== Recent activity: Pretty Holiday ===
See Spot Run released their fifth album Pretty Holiday on July 29, 2016. The first single is a cover of the Talking Heads hit "Burning Down The House".

See Spot Run released Gonna Getcha in late 2007. The title track was immediately picked up by the hit television series Degrassi: The Next Generation. The episode featuring the song was aired on the N Network in the USA in February 2008, and on the CTV Network in Canada in March 2008.

Though the band had French-language versions of some of their singles, they released their first full-length French-language album Super-héros sous peu in late 2008 through DEP/Rocket9 Music. See Spot Run was the opening act at Rogers Sarnia Bayfest for Bon Jovi on July 6, 2008, and Stone Temple Pilots with Our Lady Peace on July 13, 2009.

== Discography ==
=== Releases ===
Date	Title	Label
1993	Traces (EP)	Primer Records
July 2, 1997	Ten Stories High	Loggerhead Records
May 4, 1999	Weightless	Loggerhead Records
August 28, 2007	Gonna Getcha	Rocket9 Music/DEP/Universal
October 28, 2008	Super-heros Sous Peu	Rocket9 Music/DEP
July 29, 2016	Pretty Holiday	Rocket9 Music

=== Singles ===
Title	Album
"Au Naturel"	Ten Stories High
"Lucy"	Ten Stories High
"My Name is Santa"	Ten Stories High
"Weightless"	Weightless
"Terrified"	Weightless
"Weightless" (remix)	
"Decoller" ("Weightless" French remix)	
"Gonna Getcha"	Gonna Getcha
"Let It Go"	Pretty Holiday
"Burning Down The House"	Pretty Holiday

== In popular culture ==
- See Spot Run was the first band to launch an album from Toronto's Air Canada Centre with Weightless on May 3, 1999.
- The band sang the national anthems at the opening ceremonies for the Air Canada Centre as the Toronto Raptors hosted the Miami Heat on January 28, 2000.
- "Weightless" appeared on one of the first episodes of the North American show Queer as Folk.
- They appeared on the Canadian science program Popular Mechanics for Kids.
- The song "Gonna Getcha" was used in an episode of the hit Canadian teen drama Degrassi: The Next Generation.
