= Bombs Over Providence =

Canadian punk pop/rock band

- Origin: Brampton, Ontario, Canada
- Genres: Punk rock Pop punk
- Years active: 2001–2006
- Label: Underground Operations
- Past members: Adam Cook; Mike Smythe; Chris Corless; Shawn Dickey

Bombs Over Providence was a Canadian pop-punk/punk rock band from Brampton, Ontario, whose songs were mainly about politics. They were one of the first bands signed to the independent punk label Underground Operations.

== History ==
Bombs over Providence was formed in Brampton, by former Marilyn's Vitamins bassist Adam Cook (aka Adam Peurile) on bass, Mike Smythe and Shawn Dickey (also ex-Marilyn's Vitamins) on guitar and vocals, and drummer Chris Corless. The band released their first album, Liberty's Ugly Best Friend in 2003. The songs' lyrics concern mainly issues in Ontario politics. That year, they also contributed some songs to the compilation album (coles) Notes from the Underground, showcasing bands signed to Underground Operations.

In 2004, the band toured with Sum 41 and Protest the Hero.

In 2005, the band released their second album Shake Your Body Politic through Underground Operations. Most of the lyrics were written by Cook. Bombs Over Providence broke up in 2006.

== Discography ==
Studio albums

- Liberty's Ugly Best Friend (EP) - 2003
- Shake Your Body Politic - 2005

Compilation Inclusion

- (coles) Notes from the Underground
