= GFK (band) =

- Origin: Quebec City, Quebec, Canada
- Genres: Metalcore, Hardcore punk
- Years active: 1996–2009
- Labels: New Horizon Records; G7 Welcoming Committee
- Past members: Jessy Baron; Mick Beaudoin; Claude Gallant; Remy Verreault; Rick Pelletier; Sonny Letourneau; Vince Brass; Andre Verreault
- Website: gfkhardcore.com

GFK (Government Fury Kills) were a Canadian hardcore heavy metal band, based in Quebec City. Their songs have lyrics with political messages.

== History ==
GFK formed in 1996. In 2000, their first album, The Social Responsibility Theory was released on their own New Horizon Records label. This was followed in 2002 by In Defence of Politics, also on New Horizon, with lyrics in English, French, and German.

In 2006, GFK toured across Canada, performing about 70 concerts. That year bassist Claude Gallant joined the band, replacing Sonny Létourneau. In 2006, GFK released a five-song EP entitled Thanatopolicy.

The band recorded a split album with I Hate Sally on Underground Operations in 2007. Also in 2007, the band performed in Toronto with Propagandhi. Their album If Liberty Isn't Given, It Should Be Taken, released that year, is an extremely heavy and politically-based representation of the band's roots. Reviewers criticized the instrumentation and poor production values while praising the lyrics.

GFK disbanded in 2009.

== Discography ==
- 1999: Split with Chicken Nuggets (Punk Rock with Simon, Sebastien Clou, Evans (Jess' Cousin) and Christian)
- 2000: The Social Responsibility Theory - (New Horizon Records)
- 2002: In Defence of Politics
- 2004: If Liberty Isn't Given, It Should Be Taken - (G7 Welcoming Committee)
- 2006: Thanatopolicy (EP)
- 2007: I Hate Sally Vs GFK: Sp(l)it EP - (Underground Operations)
