= The Artist Life =

Canadian pop punk band

- Origin: Burlington, Ontario, Canada
- Genres: Pop punk
- Years active: 2005–2012
- Labels: Underground Operations
- Past members: Ian Blackwood; Dean Richards; Justin Zoltek; Jake Parsonson; Chuck Leach; Chris Danner; Andy Crawford; David Palmer

The Artist Life was a Canadian pop punk band from Burlington, Ontario, signed to Underground Operations.

== History ==
The Artist Life was started in 2005 by Ian Blackwood (formerly of Jersey, on vocals and guitar, and Dean Richards (formerly of Fallen Year and Dreams Among Stars) on guitar and vocals. They added Andy Crawford (formerly of Beaumont) on bass and Chris Danner (formerly of Grade and To The Lions) on drums and played their first show April 17, 2006, at Toronto's Bovine Sex Club with The Video Dead. Within a year, the band had recorded a 5-song demo of which they gave away over 1,000 copies. They also played several one-off concerts, though they never played outside of Ontario.

By the fall of 2006, Danner and Crawford had left the band. Blackwood and Richards decided to enter the studio and record an EP with their friend David Palmer (formerly of The Stickup). They released the Living EP in early 2007 as a free download on the band's website. Following its release, Jake Parsonson (formerly of Madrid is Burning) joined as the full-time drummer and Chuck Leach (formerly of Jude the Obscure and At the Mercy of Inspiration) joined as the permanent bassist.

The band began touring around the country and venturing into the United States in support of Living. They also began to receive some radio and video play of “Waiting Room” on MuchMusic. The band's song "Piss Test" was used in a West49 television commercial. The success of Living led the radio station 102.1 The Edge (CFNY-FM) to present the band with the Young Jedi Up and Coming Band award at its inaugural Punk-o-Rama FU Awards.

The band hit the studio again to record 2 demo songs to pitch to labels. Following an article in Alternative Press, the band was approached by Canadian record label Underground Operations, which signed them in September 2008. Their second EP, Let's Start A Riot, was released October 28, 2008. A video was released for the title song; the video for "Sleep So Sound" gained the band even more street credit, and the song was nominated for an FU Award for Song of the Year.

In 2009, Leach left the band and was replaced by bassist Justin Zoltek. The Artist Life toured Canada with Stereos and The Midway State, played the Cutting Edge Music Festival and a stretch of dates with The Snips and Brights to coincide with the digital release of Let’s Start A Campfire, the acoustic counterpart to Let's Start A Riot.

In 2011, the band released the LP "Impossible". They performed "Steel City" on ExploreMusic and released a video for the song "Find You". They played shows in southern Ontario.

The band announced its breakup on February 1, 2012.

== Discography ==
Year	Title	Type	Record label
2007	Living	EP	Self-Released
2008	Let's Start a Riot	EP	Underground Operations
2009	Let's Start a Campfire	EP	Underground Operations
2011	Impossible	LP	Underground Operations
