= Dean Lickyer =

- Origin: Hamilton, Ontario, Canada
- Genre: Rock music
- Years active: 2004–11
- Label: Independent
- Spinoffs: The Zilis, The Bleeding Idahos
- Website: bleedingidahos.com

Dean Lickyer was a Canadian rock music group formed in 2004 in Hamilton. Originally playing together as High Voltage, the band selected their Dean Lickyer name in 2008 to recognize the man whose love of rock and roll had helped inspire them. Two of the members continue to write original music as The Bleeding Idahos.

== Biography ==
The band's name pays homage to Dean Lequyer, a high school friend of band member Sean Royle's father. Lequyer had introduced Royle's father to classic rock artists before they were widely popular, including Pink Floyd, Led Zeppelin, and Humble Pie, to name a few. Although Lequyer died in the late 1990s, Royle's father passed this interest down to his son. Originally playing together as High Voltage, the band selected their new name in 2008 to recognize the man whose love of rock and roll had helped inspire them.

In December 2008, the band was featured on the Much Music television show DisBAND (Ep. 110). The following year they took part in the 2009 Canadian Music Week and were awarded $10,000 by Gene Simmons for being the best band at the festival. They would later go on to open for KISS at the 2009 Sarnia Bayfest. In 2010, the band completed a Canada wide tour opening for the band Flogging Molly, followed by a short break during which Alvernia underwent surgery to fix a throat problem.

In February 2011, they won a contest held by Toronto, Ontario-based radio station Q107 to open for Bon Jovi at the Air Canada Centre in Toronto. During that time, the group had begun the process of recording their second album at Metalworks Studios in Mississauga. Different ideas in regard to the direction of the group, however, would lead to a mutual decision among members to dissolve the band, postponing the completion of the album indefinitely.

Between 2012 and 2014, Royle, Bozzo, and Lamothe toured and released two albums as The Zilis. Bozzo and Royle remain close and are releasing an LP record as a series of singles under the name, The Bleeding Idahos.

== Awards ==
- Y108 - Winner, Breakout Band of the Year (2007)
- Hamilton Music Awards - "Best Loud/Metal Recording" (2007)
- Roger's Spring Music Festival - "Best of Fest" (2008)
- Hamilton Music Awards - "Best Local Group" (2008)
- Canadian Music Week - "Best Band" (2009)
- View Magazine - "Best Local Band" and "The Band Most Likely to Make it Big" (2009)
- Y108 - Winner, Y108 Rock and Roll Picnic (2009)

== Band members ==
Past Members

- Joshua Alvernia – vocals (2006–11)
- Sean Royle – guitar, backing vocals (2006–11)
- Justin Bozzo – bass guitar, backing vocals (2006–11)
- Zander Lamothe – drums (2010–11)

Other Members

- Eric Martin – guitar (2006–08), drums (2008–10)
- Lucas Arnold - drums
- Savino Capobianco - bass(2004–2007)

== Discography ==
=== Dean Lickyer Demo (2008) ===
1. Hog - 4:12
2. Never Let You Go - 4:07
3. Good To Be Home - 4:19
4. Summer Man - 2:55
5. Get Your Own - 3:04
6. Cold Times - 5:40
7. Witchin' Hour Moon - 4:35

== Festival appearances ==
- Y108 Rock and Roll Picnic (2007)
- Rogers' Spring Music Festival (2008)
- SXSW (2009)
- Rock Stock - Chatham Music Archive (2009)
- Edgefest (2009)
- Y108 Rock and Roll Picnic (2009)
- Sarnia Bayfest (2009)
- Canadian Music Week (2010)
- Burlington Sound of Music Festival (2010)
- Canadian Music Week (2011)
- SXSW (2011)
