= Dead Letter Dept. (band) =

Canadian punk band

- Also known as: The Stiffs (1996–2000)
- Origin: Toronto, Ontario, Canada
- Genres: Punk rock; emo; pop punk
- Years active: 2001–2008
- Labels: Underground Operations; Ductape; Noo Noo Records
- Past members: Rob Moir; Mike Leblanc; Andrew Sparks; Danny Complex
- Website: myspace.com/deadletterdept

Dead Letter Dept. was a Canadian punk rock band from Toronto, Ontario, Canada. The band consisted of Rob Moir (guitar/vocals), Mike Leblanc (drums), Andrew Sparks (bass), and Danny Complex (guitars). The band announced their break up on their Myspace blog in 2008. Their songs are mainly about girls and relationship with the occasional political song. Their last release was Rock n' Roll Hates You, which was released in 2005 by Underground Operations.

== Discography ==
- 1996: The Stiffs - s/t cassette (independent release)
- 1997: The Stiffs - Dumb Songs About Dumb Girls cassette (independent release)
- 1998: The Stiffs - No One Knows. 8 song cassette (independent release)
- 1999: The Stiffs - Forever In A Day. 11 song CD (Ductape Records)
- 2001: Dead Letter Dept. EP (Ductape Records)
- 2002: split release with "Left Behind" 7" (Say-Ten Records)
- 2003: Anthology UK (Noo Noo Records)
- 2005: All My Friends Love Freedom + Yes You Can't EP (Mongoose Records)
- 2005: Rock n' Roll Hates You (Underground Operations)
