= Wakestock (Canada) =

Sports and music festival

- Locations: Toronto Islands, Ontario, Canada
- Years active: 2005 -2014

The Wakestock Action Sports and Music Festival was a wakeboarding contest and Canada's largest action sports and music festival.

== History ==
Wakestock was born out of Bala, Ontario.

In 2005, the festival was moved to Toronto Islands from August 11–14. Each year the wakeboard competition is accompanied by a music festival. There are several stages with different bands playing throughout day.

There are also other attractions—in 2005 there was a skatepark set up for anyone with a skateboard. There was a Pro Freestyle motocross demonstration as well as a rail competition set up for wakeboarders. There are also separate designated alcohol serving areas because the entire festival is for all ages.

The Toronto wakeboarding festival celebrated ten years in 2007 with a 400-square-foot (37 m^{2}) Oakley Pool (designed py Pat Panakos), as well as a music festival featuring the Deftones, Goldfinger, De La Soul, Story of the Year, and Lupe Fiasco on the Telus main stage.

On August 9, 2009, Wakestock moved to Collingwood. In 2014, the festival moved back to Bala.

Wakestock 2015 was canceled and 2016 never got beyond planning stages.

== See also ==
- Wakestock (Wales)
