= Juno Award for Electronic Album of the Year =

Canadian music award

The Juno Award for Electronic Album of the Year is an annual award presented by the Canadian Academy of Recording Arts and Sciences for the best electronic album released in Canada. It has been awarded since 2011. The five nominees and eventual winner in the category are chosen by a panel of judges from the music industry across Canada.

== Recipients ==
Year	Winner	Album	Nominees	Ref.
2011	Caribou	Swim	Ivory Tower – Chilly Gonzales; Crystal Castles (II) – Crystal Castles; Latin – Holy Fuck; Running High – Poirier	
2012	Tim Hecker	Ravedeath, 1972	A Little More Than Everything – Arthur Oskan; Feel It Break – Austra; Azari & III – Azari & III; It's All True – Junior Boys	
2013	Grimes	Visions	Crystal Castles (III) – Crystal Castles; Jiaolong – Daphni; Shrines – Purity Ring; TRST – Trust	
2014	Ryan Hemsworth	Guilt Trips	A Tribe Called Red, Nation II Nation; Blue Hawaii, Untogether; Graze, Graze; Noah Pred, Third Culture	
2015	Caribou	Our Love	deadmau5, while(1<2); Lydia Ainsworth, Right from Real; Plastikman, EX; Ryan Hemsworth, Alone for the First Time	
2016	Pomo	The Other Day	AM Static, A Life Well Lived; Concubine, Concubine; Discrete, The Midas Touch; Humans, Noontide	
2017	Kaytranada	99.9%	Holy Fuck, Congrats; A Tribe Called Red, We Are the Halluci Nation; Bob Moses, Days Gone By; Harrison, Checkpoint Titanium	
2018	Rezz	Mass Manipulation	Blue Hawaii, Tenderness; CRi, Someone Else; Dabin, Two Hearts; Kid Koala feat. Emiliana Torrini, Music to Draw to: Satellite	
2019	Milk & Bone	Deception Bay	Next Season – Felix Cartal; Crystal Eyes – Ekali; Give it a Rest – Iamhill; Certain Kind of Magic – Rezz	
2020	Rezz	Beyond the Senses	Battle Lines – Bob Moses; Memory Emotion – Electric Youth; Dawn Chorus – Jacques Greene; A Beat Tape for Your Friends – Keys N Krates	
2021	Caribou	Suddenly	Lavender God — Attlas; Desire — Bob Moses; Juvenile — CRi; All the Time — Jessy Lanza	
2022	Tor	Oasis Sky	Catching Z’s — Zeds Dead; Conviction — Sydney Blu; One More Saturday Night — The Halluci Nation; Out Here With You — Attlas	
2023	Teen Daze	Interior	Rich Aucoin, Synthetic Season One; Mecha Maiko, Not OK; Odonis Odonis, Spectrums; Rezz, Nightmare on Rezz Street 2 Mix	
2024	BAMBII	Infinity Club	Rich Aucoin, Synthetic Season 2; Harrison, Birds, Bees, the Clouds and the Trees; Tim Hecker, No Highs; Kid Koala, Creatures of the Late Afternoon	
2025	Priori	This But More	Caribou, Honey; Ebony, Union; Fred Everything, Love Care Kindness & Hope; Kaytranada, Timeless	
2026	Èbony	Shades of Meridian	Cloverdale, Channel 303; Didon, Bab El Mdina; Debby Friday, The Starrr of the Queen Life; Korea Town Acid, Glow Up	
