= FabricLive.93 =

Compilation album by Dan Snaith
- Released: July 21, 2017
- Length: 1:13:43
- Label: Fabric

FabricLive chronology
FabricLive.92 (2017)	FabricLive.93 (2017)	FabricLive.94 (2017)

Dan Snaith chronology
Jiaolong (2012)	FabricLive.93 (2017)	Joli Mai (2017)

Professional ratings
Aggregate scores
Source	Rating
Metacritic	80/100
Review scores
Source	Rating
AllMusic	4/5 stars
DIY Mag	4/5 stars
Exclaim!	8/10

FabricLive.93 is a DJ mix album by Canadian musician Dan Snaith, under the stage name Daphni. It was released in July 2017 as part of the FabricLive Mix Series.

== Track listing ==
No.	Title	Length
1.	"Face to Face"	3:46
2.	"Xing Tian"	3:29
3.	"Carry On"	2:05
4.	"Futurism" (featuring Jamire Williams)	0:47
5.	"Poly"	2:28
6.	"Ten Thousand"	4:29
7.	"Medellin"	3:05
8.	"Hey Drum"	5:01
9.	"You Can Be a Star" (featuring Luther Davis Group)	4:14
10.	"Try"	1:43
11.	"Vikram"	1:02
12.	"3 in 1" (featuring Pheeroan akLaff)	2:11
13.	"Listen Up"	2:42
14.	"Tin"	2:46
15.	"Moshi"	1:32
16.	"Strange Bird"	0:36
17.	"Dissolve" (featuring Container)	1:43
18.	"Joli Mai"	1:58
19.	"Nocturne"	4:07
20.	"So It Seems"	4:21
21.	"Screaming Man Baby"	1:40
22.	"Vs"	2:19
23.	"The Truth"	3:27
24.	"406.42 ppm"	3:28
25.	"Always There"	2:56
26.	"Fly Away"	2:01
27.	"Life's What You Make It"	3:47
