= 2017 Polaris Music Prize =

Canadian music award

- Date: September 18, 2017
- Country: Canada
- Winner(s): Lido Pimienta, La Papessa
- Website: polarismusicprize.ca

The 2017 edition of the Canadian Polaris Music Prize was presented on September 18, 2017.

== Shortlist ==
The ten-album shortlist was announced on July 13.

- Lido Pimienta, La Papessa
- A Tribe Called Red, We Are the Halluci Nation
- BADBADNOTGOOD, IV
- Leonard Cohen, You Want It Darker
- Gord Downie, Secret Path
- Feist, Pleasure
- Lisa LeBlanc, Why You Wanna Leave, Runaway Queen?
- Tanya Tagaq, Retribution
- Leif Vollebekk, Twin Solitude
- Weaves, Weaves

== Longlist ==
The prize's preliminary 40-album longlist was announced on June 13.

- A Tribe Called Red, We Are the Halluci Nation
- Alaclair Ensemble, Les Frères Cueilleurs
- Anciients, Voice of the Void
- Arkells, Morning Report
- Philippe B, La grande nuit vidéo
- BADBADNOTGOOD, IV
- Louise Burns, Young Mopes
- Chocolat, Rencontrer Looloo
- Clairmont the Second, Quest For Milk and Honey
- Leonard Cohen, You Want It Darker
- Antoine Corriveau, Cette chose qui cognait au creux de sa poitrine sans vouloir s'arrêter
- Le Couleur, P.O.P.
- Marie Davidson, Adieux au dancefloor
- Mac DeMarco, This Old Dog
- Gord Downie, Secret Path
- Drake, More Life
- Feist, Pleasure
- Figure Walking, The Big Other
- Fiver, Audible Songs from Rockwood
- Geoffroy, Coastline
- Hannah Georgas, For Evelyn
- Japandroids, Near to the Wild Heart of Life
- Carly Rae Jepsen, Emotion: Side B
- B. A. Johnston, Gremlins III
- Lisa LeBlanc, Why You Wanna Leave, Runaway Queen?
- The New Pornographers, Whiteout Conditions
- Klô Pelgag, L'Étoile thoracique
- Peter Peter, Noir Éden
- Lido Pimienta, La Papessa
- Jessie Reyez, Kiddo
- Daniel Romano, Modern Pressure
- The Sadies, Northern Passages
- John K. Samson, Winter Wheat
- Tanya Tagaq, Retribution
- The Tragically Hip, Man Machine Poem
- TUNS, TUNS
- Leif Vollebekk, Twin Solitude
- Weaves, Weaves
- The Weeknd, Starboy
- Charlotte Day Wilson, CDW

== Heritage Prize ==
Nominees for the Polaris Heritage Prize, a separate award to honour classic Canadian albums released before the creation of the Polaris Prize, were announced at the main Polaris gala, and the winners were announced on October 25.

=== 1960–1975 ===
- Public: Gordon Lightfoot, Lightfoot!
- Jury: The Band, The Band
- The Band, Music from Big Pink
- Beau Dommage, Beau Dommage
- Robert Charlebois and Louise Forestier, Lindberg
- Joni Mitchell, Court and Spark
- Jackie Mittoo, Wishbone
- The Oscar Peterson Trio, Night Train
- Jackie Shane, Jackie Shane Live
- Neil Young, Everybody Knows This Is Nowhere

=== 1976–1985 ===
- Public: Harmonium, L'Heptade
- Jury: Glenn Gould, Bach: The Goldberg Variations
- Bruce Cockburn, Stealing Fire
- D.O.A., Hardcore '81
- Fifth Column, To Sir With Hate
- Gowan, Strange Animal
- Martha and the Muffins, This Is the Ice Age
- Jackie Mittoo, Showcase Volume 3
- Rough Trade, Avoid Freud
- Leroy Sibbles, On Top

=== 1986–1995 ===
- Public: The Tragically Hip, Fully Completely
- Jury: Eric's Trip, Love Tara
- Dream Warriors, And Now the Legacy Begins
- k. d. lang, Ingénue
- Daniel Lanois, Acadie
- Maestro Fresh Wes, Symphony in Effect
- Main Source, Breaking Atoms
- Sarah McLachlan, Fumbling Towards Ecstasy
- Alanis Morissette, Jagged Little Pill
- John Oswald, Plunderphonics

=== 1996–2005 ===
- Public: Feist, Let It Die
- Jury: k-os, Joyful Rebellion
- Bran Van 3000, Glee
- Broken Social Scene, You Forgot It in People
- Constantines, Shine a Light
- The Dears, No Cities Left
- Destroyer, Streethawk: A Seduction
- Esthero, Breath from Another
- The New Pornographers, Mass Romantic
- The Weakerthans, Left and Leaving
