= Nation II Nation =

Studio album by A Tribe Called Red
- Released: May 7, 2013
- Genre: Electronic, hip hop, Aboriginal music of Canada
- Length: 40:00
- Label: Radicalized Records

A Tribe Called Red chronology
A Tribe Called Red (2012)	Nation II Nation (2013)	We Are the Halluci Nation (2016)

Nation II Nation is the second studio album by Canadian electronic music group The Halluci Nation, released on May 7, 2013, by Radicalized Records, an imprint of Pirates Blend Records.

== Background ==
At the time, the group was still performing under the name A Tribe Called Red. The album builds on the musical foundation of their self-titled debut album, combining powwow vocals and drumming with electronic music genres like electronica, techno, and dubstep.

The album features many collaborations with powwow drum groups and dancers from across North America. Groups featured include Black Bear, Sitting Bear, Chippawa Travellers, Smoke Trail, Northern Voice, Eastern Eagle, and Sheldon Sundown. Canadian hip hop artist Northern Voice is also featured on the track "Sisters".

== Critical reception ==
Nation II Nation received positive reviews from music critics. At Metacritic, which assigns a normalized rating out of 100 to reviews from mainstream critics, the album has received an average score of 80, based on 5 reviews, indicating "generally favorable reviews".

Reviewers praised the album's ability to blend modern musical styles with traditional Native vocals and drumming. Exclaim! called it "an inspired mix of cultures", while AllMusic wrote that "these cuts blaze the trail between modernity and ancient traditions." Critics also highlighted the album's political messaging, with Now stating that "...the trio tackle First Nations issues head-on over hard-hitting bass and crackling electronics."

== Track listing ==
All tracks are written by The Halluci Nation.

No.	Title	Length
1.	"Bread & Cheese" (featuring Black Bear)	4:23
2.	"Ndn Stakes" (featuring Sitting Bear)	4:17
3.	"The Road" (featuring Black Bear)	3:05
4.	"Different Heroes" (featuring Northern Voice)	3:45
5.	"Sisters" (featuring Northern Voice)	4:32
6.	"Electronic Intertribal" (featuring Smoke Trail)	3:42
7.	"Pbc" (featuring Sheldon Sundown)	4:15
8.	"Red Ribbon" (featuring Eastern Eagle)	4:03
9.	"Tanto's Revenge" (featuring Chippewa Travellers)	4:00
10.	"Sweet Milk Pop"	3:32
Total length:		40 min

== Impact ==
The group made history as the first Indigenous group to win a Juno Award in the Best Breakthrough Group category in the 2014 Juno Awards. Additionally, Nation II Nation was nominated for Electronic Album of the Year the same year, losing to Guilt Trips by Ryan Hemsworth.

Nation II Nation was a shortlisted nominee for the 2013 Polaris Music Prize.

The album was nominated for 5 Aboriginal Peoples Choice Music Awards and received of Best Group, Best Produce, Best Album and Best Cover.
