= One More Saturday Night (The Halluci Nation album) =

Studio album by The Halluci Nation
- Released: July 30, 2021
- Genre: Electronic, hip hop, Aboriginal music of Canada
- Length: 48:00
- Label: Radicalized Records

The Halluci Nation chronology
| We Are the Halluci Nation (2016) | One More Saturday Night (2021) |

One More Saturday Night is the fourth studio album by Canadian electronic music group The Halluci Nation, released on July 30, 2021, by Radicalized Records, an imprint of Pirates Blend Records.

== Background ==
One More Saturday Night is a concept album inspired by the Electronic Pow Wow nights hosted by The Halluci Nation at the Babylon nightclub in Ottawa, Ontario. These events featured the use of traditional powwow chants blended with electronic music genres including dubstep, moombahton, and reggae. On July 5, 2021, the group changed their name from ‘A Tribe Called Red’ to The Halluci Nation. The album, along with the name change, serves as a tribute to their history and represents the beginning of a new future.

The album consists of a wide variety of collaborators. Some of these artists include Keith Secola, Rob Ruha, Odario Williams, and Polaris Music Prize winner Haviah Mighty. Tracks also feature Canadian powwow vocals from Black Bear and percussion from the Anushinaabeg family drum group known as the Chippewa Travelers.

One More Saturday Night was constructed with the aid of key mentors Malcolm Cecil and John Trudell. Cecil offered professional and technical support during the album’s recording, and Trudell provided ideas for new material.

== Themes ==
One Saturday Night consists of songs that express the celebratory aspects of indigenous culture. The songs "Ba Na Na" and "Takarita" include upbeat guitar rhythms and reggaeton beats that encourage the listener to dance.

Other tracks on the album address topics of indigenous rights and land ownership. Songs including as "Land Back", "The OG", and "Collaboration ≠ Appropriation" touch on these themes.

== Songs ==
The opening track "Remember 01" is dedicated to the mentorship of John Trudell. Trudell provided the group with ideas and a vision for the future. He was the main inspiration behind the group's name change in 2021.

In collaboration with Rob Ruha, the track "Takarita" blends guitar, traditional percussion, and vocals to create a joyful experience for the listener. The Halluci Nation members Thomas and Hill traveled to New Zealand with Rob Ruha to record the song.

== Track listing ==
All music is composed by Tim "2oolman" Hill and Ehren "Bear Witness" Thomas.

| No. | Title | Length |
|---|---|---|
| 1. | "Remember 01" (featuring John Trudell and Black Bear) | 2:47 |
| 2. | "It's Over" (featuring Chippewa Travelers) | 3:44 |
| 3. | "Tanokumbia" (featuring El Dusty and Black Bear) | 3:21 |
| 4. | "NDN Kars" (remix) | 2:30 |
| 5. | "Remember 02" (featuring Chippewa Travelers) | 1:51 |
| 6. | "Stay" (featuring Antoine, Tom Power & Chippewa Travelers) | 3:09 |
| 7. | "Land Back" (featuring Boogey The Beat & Northern Voice) | 3:24 |
| 8. | "Takarita" (featuring Rob Huna) | 4:54 |
| 9. | "Remember 03" (featuring STLNDRMS) | 1:13 |
| 10. | "When We Fly" (featuring Jen Kreisberg) | 3:57 |
| 11. | "Ba Na Na" (featuring Odario, Haviah Mighty & Chippewa Travelers) | 3:42 |
| 12. | "The OG" (featuring Black Bear) | 3:31 |
| 13. | "Collaboration = Appropriation" | 3:00 |
| 14. | "Mother Mother" (featuring Lillian Allen, SATE, The Northwest Kid & Chippewa Travelers) | 4:19 |
| 15. | "Remember 04" (featuring Re. verse & Chippewa Travellers) | 2:37 |
| Total length: | | 48 Min |
