= Tor (musician) =

Canadian electronic musician

Tor Sjogren, who records mononymously as Tor, is a Canadian electronic musician from Vancouver, British Columbia, who won the Juno Award for Electronic Album of the Year at the Juno Awards of 2022 for his album Oasis Sky.

He began his career in 2009 with Illinoize, a remix album which blended hip hop songs by artists such as Aesop Rock, Outkast and Big Daddy Kane with samples from Sufjan Stevens' 2005 album Illinois.

== Discography ==
- Illinoize (2009)
- Drum Therapy (2012)
- Blue Book (2016)
- Blue Book Remixed (2017)
- Oasis Sky (2021)
- Oasis Sky Remixed (2022)
