= Miss Colombia (album) =

Studio album by Lido Pimienta
- Released: April 17, 2020
- Genres: Latin pop, electronic
- Length: 43:36
- Language: Spanish
- Label: Anti-
- Producers: Prince Nifty, Lido Pimienta

Lido Pimienta chronology
| La Papessa (2016) | Miss Colombia (2020) | La Belleza (2025) |

Miss Colombia is the third studio album by Colombian–Canadian musician Lido Pimienta. It was released on April 17, 2020, through Anti Records. The album features collaborations with Li Saumet, vocalist of Bomba Estereo, as well as Rafael Cassiani Cassiani and Sexteto Tabala. The album was nominated for several awards, such as the Latin Grammy Award for Best Alternative Music Album, the Grammy Award for Best Latin Rock or Alternative Album, the Polaris Music Prize and the Juno Award for Recording Package of the Year.

== Background ==
The album title comes from the Miss Universe 2015 controversy, when the presenter of the show, Steve Harvey, mistakenly announced Ariadna Gutiérrez of Colombia as the new Miss Universe. Only after being crowned did Harvey return to the stage to apologize, stating that Gutiérrez was in fact the first runner-up, with Pia Wurtzbach of the Philippines the actual winner. Following the incident, racism from Colombians towards Harvey and Wurtzbach led Pimienta to reflect on her identity and on differences between her home country of Colombia and her country of residence, Canada. She said "the floodgates opened, my head exploded, depression started, anxiety began...and now we have the album!"

== Critical reception ==
Professional ratings
Aggregate scores
| Source | Rating |
|---|---|
| Metacritic | 86/100 |
Review scores
| Source | Rating |
| AllMusic | 5/5 stars |
| DIY | 3.5/5 stars |
| Exclaim! | 9/10 |
| NME | 4/5 stars |
| Pitchfork | 8.0/10 |
| Rolling Stone | 4/5 stars |
| Songlines | 5/5 stars |

Miss Colombia was met with critical acclaim. At Metacritic, the album received an average score of 86/100 based on six reviews, indicating "universal acclaim". Hannah Mylrea from New Musical Express wrote that the album "is an impressive, experimental collection, filled with complex, crunching production and romantic lyrics that recount love and loss. Mixing the old and traditional with modern elements, it’s a powerful statement of Lido Pimienta’s innovative creative vision and Colombia as a whole." Peyton Thomas from Pitchfork commented on the album and Pimienta's place within the music industry, writing, "The great promise of Miss Colombia, and of her new leadership in a predominantly white scene, is that brown girls will hear it and be inspired to surge to the front." Richard Villegas from Rolling Stone wrote, "The organic, delightfully earnest tracks blend Miss Colombia‘s avant-Latin sonic palette with revered cross-generational traditions, forging a new world of musical borderlessness that Pimienta is glad to call home."

=== Year-end lists ===
Select year-end rankings of Miss Colombia
| Publication | List | Rank | Ref. |
|---|---|---|---|
| Exclaim! | Top 50 Best Albums of 2020 | 7 | |
| NPR | The 50 Best Albums of 2020 | 3 | |
| Paste | The 50 Best Albums of 2020 | 30 | |

== Tracklist ==
All tracks were produced by Pimienta and Prince Lifty.

| No. | Title | Writer(s) | Length |
|---|---|---|---|
| 1. | "Para Transcribir (SOL)" | Lido Pimienta, Matthew Adam Smith | 2:51 |
| 2. | "Eso Que Tu Haces" | Pimienta, Smith | 4:33 |
| 3. | "Nada" (featuring Li Saumet) | Pimienta, Smith | 4:58 |
| 4. | "Te Queria" | Pimienta, Smith | 4:02 |
| 5. | "No Pude" | Pimienta, Smith | 3:48 |
| 6. | "Coming Thru" | Pimienta, Smith | 2:40 |
| 7. | "Quiero Que Me Salves (Preludio)" (featuring Rafael Cassiani Cassiani) | Pimienta | 2:33 |
| 8. | "Quiero Que Me Salves" (featuring Sexteto Tabala) | Pimienta | 6:11 |
| 9. | "Pelo Cucu" | Pimienta | 4:12 |
| 10. | "Resisto y Ya" | Pimienta, Smith | 2:46 |
| 11. | "Para Transcribir (LUNA)" | Pimienta, Smith | 4:57 |
| Total length: | | | 43:36 |
