= Black Bear (band) =

Canadian musical group

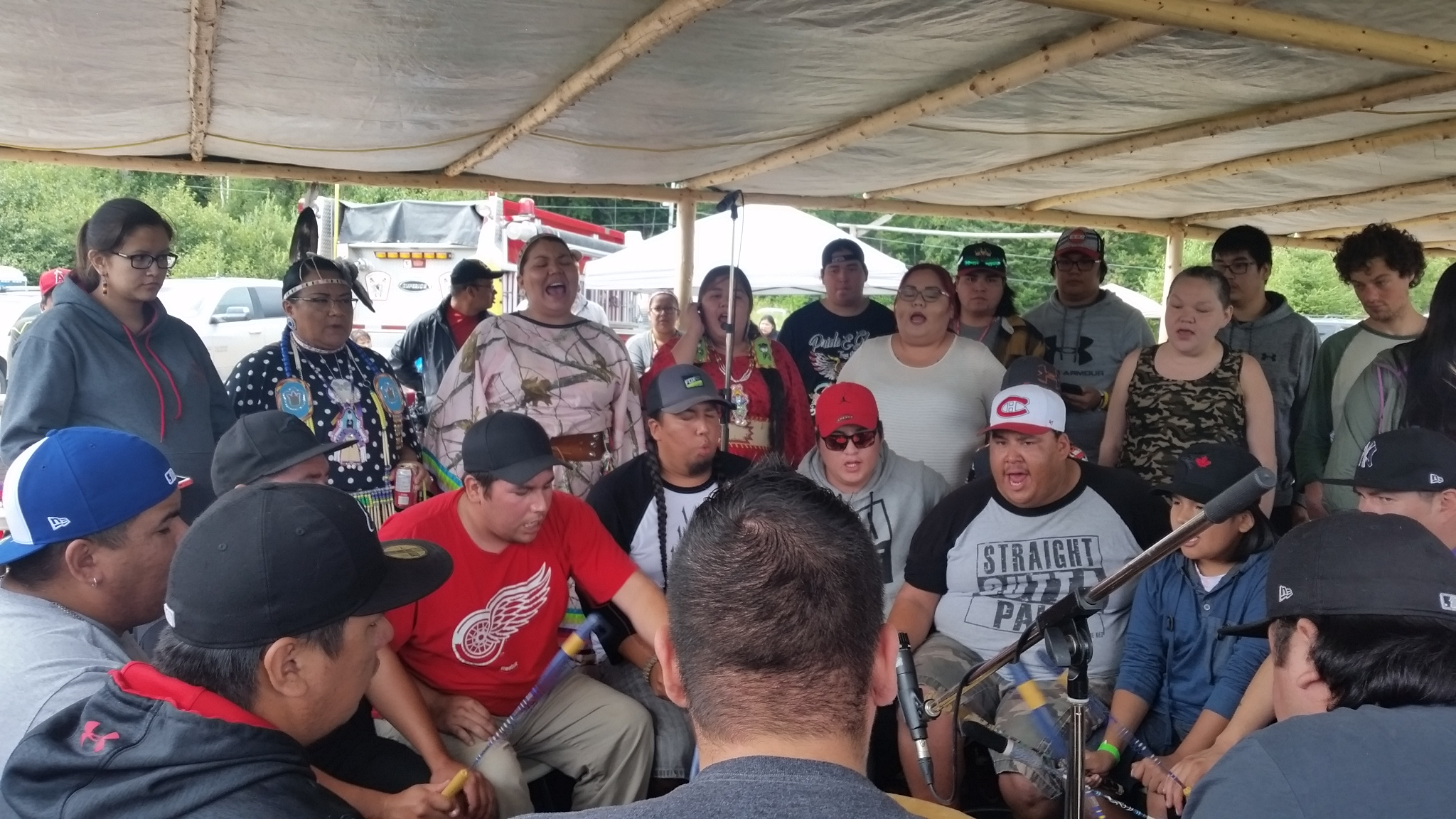
- Black Bear at the Manawan Pow-wow in 2017

Background information
- Origin: Canada
- Genre: Northern contemporary
- Years active: 2000–present
- Label: Tribal Spirit Music
- Website: blackbearsingers.com

Black Bear, sometimes credited as Black Bear Singers, are a Canadian musical group from Manawan, Quebec, who perform traditional First Nations music. They are frequent collaborators with the group The Halluci Nation.

== History ==
Black Bear started in 2000. They showed their pride in their Atikamekw culture and heritage by singing in their language, which is still commonly spoken today. They began forming in the style characterized as northern contemporary, which features high-pitched singing, songs that speed up after 2nd, 3rd and 4th song repetition (three levels of speed) and honour beats that occur at the end of the first phrase of the tail.

In 2015 Black Bear recorded an album, Come and Get Your Love: The Tribe Session, which was a shortlisted Juno Award nominee for Aboriginal Album of the Year at the Juno Awards of 2016.

The group collaborated with The Halluci Nation on their albums Nation II Nation and We Are the Halluci Nation.

The group's album Out of Hibernation was the winner of the 6th Annual Aboriginal Peoples Choice Music Awards (APCMA) in the category of Best Contemporary Powwow in 2011.

In 2016, a collaboration with The Halluci Nation was the subject of a short documentary called The Manawan Session. They group was featured on A Tribe Called Red's (now The Halluci Nation) album, Welcome to HalluciNation.

Black Bear, along with The Halluci Nation and Tanya Tagaq, performed a medley of "We Are the Halluci Nation", "Indian City" and "SILA" at the 2017 Juno Awards show in Ottawa, Ontario.

The group often performs in powwows in Ontario and Quebec.

== Discography ==
- Out of Hibernation (2011)
- Spring Medicine (2012)
- Rez Road (2013)
- Come and Get Your Love (2014)
- Notcimik (2017)
