= La Belleza (album) =

Studio album by Lido Pimienta
- Released: May 16, 2025
- Genre: R&B
- Length: 28:28
- Label: Anti-
- Producer: Owen Pallett

Lido Pimienta chronology
Miss Colombia (2020)	La Belleza (2025)

La Belleza is the fourth studio album by Colombian–Canadian musician Lido Pimienta. It was released on May 16, 2025, through Anti-.

== Background ==
Writing for La Belleza started after Pimienta's tour for Miss Colombia was cancelled due to the COVID-19 pandemic.

On April 9, 2025, Pimienta announced the release of her studio album La Belleza, along with the first single "Mango". Of the single, Lido Pimienta said it "took me back to my territory, to nature, to my people, to my village, where I watched love unfold all around me. I've always had an aversion to writing love songs - especially if they're about a man".

== Critical reception ==
Professional ratings
Review scores
Source	Rating
The Guardian	5/5 stars
Pitchfork	8/10

At Pitchfork, writer Stephanie Fernandez gave the album 8.0 out of ten, describing it as an "acoustic, liberatory record of personal homecoming and ancestral communion where rumbling timpani, portentous strings, and rising and falling woodwinds meet in conversation with claves, drums, and celestial dembow."

== Track listing ==
La Belleza track listing
No.	Title	Length
1.	"Overturn (Obertura de La Luz Eterna)"	2:57
2.	"Ahora"	5:13
3.	"Quiero Que Me Beses"	5:20
4.	"Mango"	2:55
5.	"Aún Te Quiero"	2:34
6.	"El Dembow Del Tiempo"	2:19
7.	"¿Quién Tiene La Luz (El Perdón)"	3:04
8.	"Tengo Que Ir"	2:19
9.	"Busca La Luz"	1:48
