= Azari & III (album) =

Studio album by Azari & III
- Released: July 27, 2011
- Genres: Chicago house; nu-disco; deep house; garage house; dance
- Length: 62:57
- Labels: Loose Lips; Island; Dim Mak

Azari & III chronology
Azari & III (2011)	Remix Album 2013 (2013)

Singles from Azari & III
- 1. "Hungry for the Power" Released: 2009; 2. "Reckless (With Your Love)" Released: 2009; 3. "Indigo" Released: 2010; 4. "Into the Night" Released: 2010; 5. "Manic" Released: 2011; 6. "Lost in Time" Released: 2012

Azari & III is the only studio album by Canadian music group Azari & III. First released in 2011 by Loose Lips Records, it spawned the popular singles "Hungry for the Power" and "Reckless (With Your Love)". The album met with warm critical reception and minor commercial success.

== Background ==
Burj Khalifa was recreated in the album's cover

Azari & III was recorded and mixed at Parkdalian Sound studios in Toronto, and mastered by Noah Mintz at The Lacquer Channel. The material was written and produced exclusively by the members of Azari & III.

The album was released in Japan in July 2011, followed by the international release in August. In February 2012, Azari & III was picked by Island Records for the UK re-release. In October 2012, the album was released in the USA by Dim Mak Records.

The album cover presents a giant hand squeezing the world's tallest building, Burj Khalifa in Dubai. Zachary Houle of PopMatters interpreted the image as "a female hand clutching a phallic skyscraper" and perceived it as a reference to the cover of The Velvet Underground's album Squeeze. The album cover was designed by Drew Heffron, collaging two black and white photographs by his friend, Guillaume Gilbert.

The first two singles, "Hungry for the Power" and "Reckless (With Your Love)", were released already in autumn 2009. November 2010 saw the release of "Indigo" and "Into the Night". "Hungry for the Power" and "Reckless (With Your Love)" were re-released in 2011, followed by the release of another single, "Manic", in August. In 2012, "Into the Night" was re-released and accompanied by a music video, followed by "Lost in Time" and the re-release of "Indigo" in 2013.

== Critical reception ==
Professional ratings
Aggregate scores
Source	Rating
Metacritic	76/100
Review scores
Source	Rating
Digital Spy	3/5 stars
The Guardian	3/5 stars
NME	8/10
Pitchfork	7.3/10
PopMatters	7/10 stars

The album received positive reviews from music critics. At Metacritic, which assigns a weighted mean rating out of 100 to reviews from mainstream critics, the album received an average score of 76, based on 16 reviews, which indicates "generally favorable reviews". In his favourable review for BBC Music, Luke Turner refers to the album as "an intelligent, decadent debut", concluding that it "will be one of the finest electronic pop records" of 2011. Both The Guardian's Maddy Costa and John Doran of NME have praised the vocal of Cédric Gasaida, known as Starving Yet Full, naming it the band's "greatest asset" and calling the singer "thoroughly angelic" and "uniquely talented".

Azari & III was also nominated to Juno Award for Electronic Album of the Year in 2012.

== Commercial performance ==
Upon its initial release in 2011, Azari & III entered UK Albums Chart at number 195 and UK Dance Albums Chart at number 13. When re-released in 2012, the album peaked at number 189 in the UK and re-entered Dance Albums Chart at number 14. The album failed to chart elsewhere.

In 2024, London DJ/producer Max Dean released a modern reinterpretation of "Reckless (With Your Love)" called “Reckless (2024)” through Positiva Records. The track has garnered over 17 million streams on Spotify.

== Track listing ==
No.	Title	Length
1.	"Into the Night"	5:15
2.	"Reckless (With Your Love)"	5:45
3.	"Tunnel Vision"	4:37
4.	"Indigo"	6:20
5.	"Lost in Time"	6:17
6.	"Infiniti"	6:07
7.	"Change of Heart"	6:45
8.	"Manhooker"	4:47
9.	"Undecided"	6:06
10.	"Hungry for the Power"	5:05
11.	"Manic"	5:43

Japanese edition bonus tracks
No.	Title	Length
12.	"Manic" (DJ Sneak Maniatico Remix)	8:18
13.	"Into the Night" (Nicolas Jaar Remix)	7:18

UK edition bonus tracks
No.	Title	Length
12.	"Into the Night" (Nicolas Jaar Remix)	7:18
13.	"Hungry for the Power" (Jamie Jones Ridge Street Mix)	6:47

== Charts ==
Chart (2011–12)	Peak position
UK Albums Chart	189
UK Dance Albums Chart	13
UK Independent Albums Chart	33
