= Suddenly (Caribou album) =

Studio album by Caribou
- Released: February 28, 2020
- Genres: Pop; electronica; electronic pop
- Length: 43:28
- Labels: City Slang; Merge
- Producer: Dan Snaith

Caribou chronology
Our Love (2014)	Suddenly (2020)	Honey (2024)

Singles from Suddenly
- 1. "Home" Released: October 10, 2019; 2. "You and I" Released: December 5, 2019; 3. "Never Come Back" Released: January 29, 2020

Suddenly is the ninth studio album by Canadian musician Dan Snaith, released under the moniker Caribou by Merge Records and City Slang on February 28, 2020. It is Snaith's fifth album as Caribou, and his first since Our Love (2014).

== Background and recording ==
Snaith had approximately 900 "draft ideas" for the album that he cut down to 12 complete tracks. The album's themes include the nature and constant evolution of relationships with family and friends. Snaith named the album Suddenly because of his daughter's "obsession with the word".

== Critical reception ==
Professional ratings
Aggregate scores
Source	Rating
AnyDecentMusic?	8.2/10
Metacritic	84/100
Review scores
Source	Rating
AllMusic	4/5 stars
The Daily Telegraph	4/5 stars
DIY	4/5 stars
Exclaim!	9/10
The Guardian	5/5 stars
The Independent	4/5 stars
NME	4/5 stars
Pitchfork	8.2/10
Slant Magazine	4.5/5 stars
The Times	4/5 stars

Tom Sloman of DIY stated that the album "continues Caribou's knack of releasing albums that are both accessible and explorative". Seth Wilson of Slant Magazine wrote that "What makes the album so spectacular, though, is Snaith's voice. This is the first Caribou effort on which he sings on every track, and his vocals are mixed higher than they have been in the past. Throughout, his mesmerizing vocals elevate songs that might otherwise scan as banal." Wilson also felt that "The album rewards [...] reference-spotting, and it's a treat to listen to the way such a masterful musician mines his own record collection for inspiration." Reviewing the album for NME, Thomas Smith felt that "Your history with Snaith's catalogue will dictate which elements of 'Suddenly' are most intriguing. The more experimental and unsettling elements will reward longtime stans, while recent converts will be just as thrilled with its party-starting exuberance."

Writing for Resident Advisor, Carlos Hawthorn called the album a "slight pivot away from the dance floor" that "has its ravey moments, but overall there's less chugging and thudding and more of a focus on songwriting. The energy swings wildly from zany pop and Technicolor house to tender ballads with no beat." He ultimately judged the album to be a "frustrating listen. Snaith's talent for writing earworms, hooks and choruses has never been so apparent. But overall he sounds like he's trying too hard, taking influence from too many places."

The album won the Juno Award for Electronic Album of the Year at the Juno Awards of 2021.

=== Accolades ===
Accolades for Suddenly
Publication	Accolade	Rank	Ref.
Billboard	Billboard's 50 Best Albums of 2020 – Mid-Year	—N/a	
Paste	Paste's 25 Best Albums of 2020 – Mid-Year	10	
Stereogum	Stereogum's 50 Best Albums of 2020 – Mid-Year	17	
Stereogum	The 50 Best Albums of 2020	36	
Rolling Stone	Rolling Stone's 50 Best Albums of 2020 – Mid-Year	—N/a	
Under the Radar	Under the Radar's Top 100 Albums of 2020	22	

== Track listing ==
All tracks are written by Dan Snaith, except where noted.

Suddenly track listing
No.	Title	Writer(s)	Length
1.	"Sister"		2:11
2.	"You and I"		4:03
3.	"Sunny's Time"		2:49
4.	"New Jade"		3:37
5.	"Home"	Snaith; Bobby Dixon	2:36
6.	"Lime"	Snaith; Gerard Tempesti; Constant Achoun; Dominique Pelon	2:55
7.	"Never Come Back"		5:05
8.	"Filtered Grand Piano"		0:53
9.	"Like I Loved You"		4:05
10.	"Magpie"		3:55
11.	"Ravi"		4:29
12.	"Cloud Song"		6:50
Total length:			43:28

== Charts ==
Chart performance for Suddenly
Chart (2020)	Peak position
Australian Albums (ARIA)	35
Austrian Albums (Ö3 Austria)	20
Belgian Albums (Ultratop Flanders)	18
Belgian Albums (Ultratop Wallonia)	173
Canadian Albums (Billboard)	87
Dutch Albums (Album Top 100)	66
French Albums (SNEP)	98
German Albums (Offizielle Top 100)	25
Irish Albums (Official Charts)	27
Italian Albums (FIMI)	97
Scottish Albums (Official Charts)	9
Spanish Albums (PROMUSICAE)	53
Swiss Albums (Schweizer Hitparade)	25
UK Albums (Official Charts)	13
UK Dance Albums (Official Charts)	2
UK Independent Albums (Official Charts)	3
US Billboard 200	154
US Independent Albums (Billboard)	18
US Top Album Sales (Billboard)	19
US Top Alternative Albums (Billboard)	9
US Top Dance Albums (Billboard)	2
US Vinyl Albums (Billboard)	8
