= Cherry (Daphni album) =

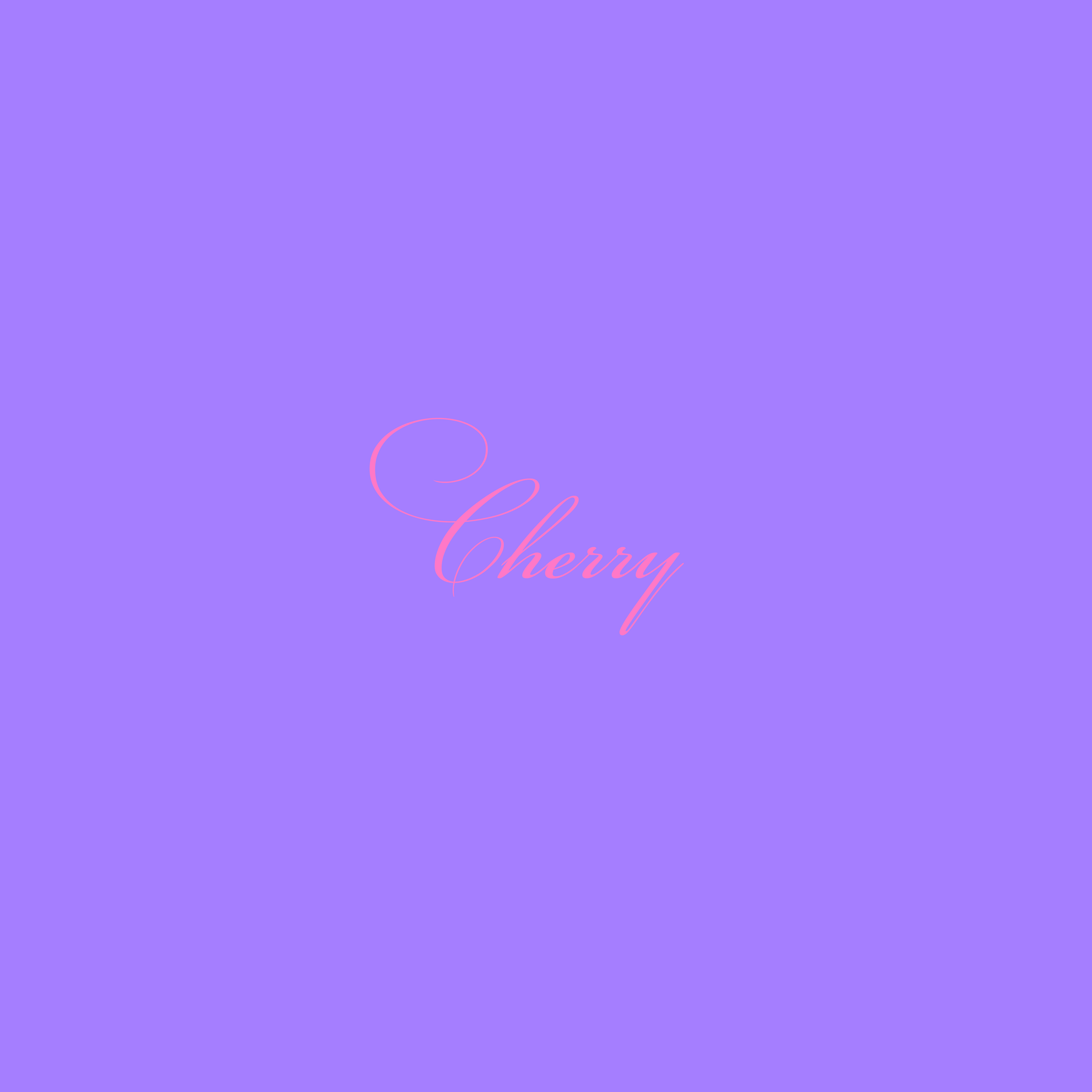

Studio album by Daphni
- Released: October 7, 2022
- Studio: Metropolis, London, England, United Kingdom
- Genre: Electronic music
- Length: 47:40
- Language: English
- Label: Jiaolong
- Producer: Dan Snaith

Daphni chronology
Joli Mai (2017)	Cherry (2022)	'Butterfly' (2026)

Cherry is the tenth studio album by Canadian electronic musician Dan Snaith, and the third under his stage name Daphni. It has received positive reviews from critics.

== Reception ==
Professional ratings
Aggregate scores
Source	Rating
AnyDecentMusic?	7.2/10 (8 reviews)
Metacritic	82/100 (8 reviews)
Review scores
Source	Rating
AllMusic	4/5 stars
Exclaim!	7/10
Loud and Quiet	7/10
musicOMH	3.5/5 stars
NME	4/5 stars
Pitchfork	8.2/10
Uncut	8/10

Editors at AnyDecentMusic? characterize eight reviews as a 7.2 out of 10. According to the review aggregator Metacritic, Cherry received "universal acclaim" based on a weighted average score of 82 out of 100 from eight critic scores.

Editors at AllMusic chose this as one of the favorite electronic albums of 2022 and rated this album 4 out of 5 stars, with critic Heather Phares writing that "one of the greatest strengths of Dan Snaith's music as Daphni is its refreshing directness" and that this album "creates a new kind of tension in Daphni's music, as well as a spontaneity that seduces his audience into movement ever more cleverly". Calum Slingerland of Exclaim! gave Cherry a 7 out of 10, stating that it "bursts with sugary melody made more pronounced by considered yet largely unobtrusive drum patterns" and "blossoms as a listen worth savouring as Daphni's melodious detail leads the dance". Loud and Quiet's Reef Younis also gave a 7 out of 10, calling this effort "more exploratory and experimental" than Snaith's work under the name Caribou. Ben Devlin of musicOMH rated this release 3.5 out of 5 stars, complaining that some "tracks are cruel in their brevity" and writes that "the listening experience is undoubtedly good fun" in spite of "reduced quality control".

Writing for NME, Sam Moore gave this album 4 out of 5 stars, praising Snaith's ability to choose different tones and moods in his music and pointing out some tracks as "fine examples of when his toned-down production approach works wonders, though he can be guilty of overindulging". Editors of Pitchfork chose this album as Best New Music of the week and critic Philip Sherburne gave it an 8.2 out of 10, characterizing the album as a "tour de force of dancefloor intuition and emotional release, [with] no point to prove; pleasure is the chief, perhaps the only, concern". In Resident Advisor, Andrew Ryce characterizes the short tracks as having "an infectious and cheery energy that's hard not to get swept up in", making music that is "vibrant and beautifully textured". Jason Anderson of Uncut scored Cherry an 8 out of 10 for having "a diverse array of dance and electronic music modes".

== Track listing ==
All songs written by Dan Snaith.

1. "Arrow" – 3:07
2. "Cherry" – 5:55
3. "Always There" – 3:41
4. "Crimson" – 2:54
5. "Arp Blocks" – 2:09
6. "Falling" – 1:12
7. "Mania" – 3:36
8. "Take Two" – 3:19
9. "Mona" – 2:51
10. "Clavicle" – 3:33
11. "Cloudy" – 6:51
12. "Karplus" – 1:48
13. "Amber" – 3:50
14. "Fly Away" – 2:54

== Personnel ==
- Dan Snaith – instrumentation, production
- 555‒5555 – art direction and design
- Matt Colton – mastering

== See also ==
- Lists of 2022 albums
