= Lido Pimienta =

Colombian Canadian singer (born 1986)

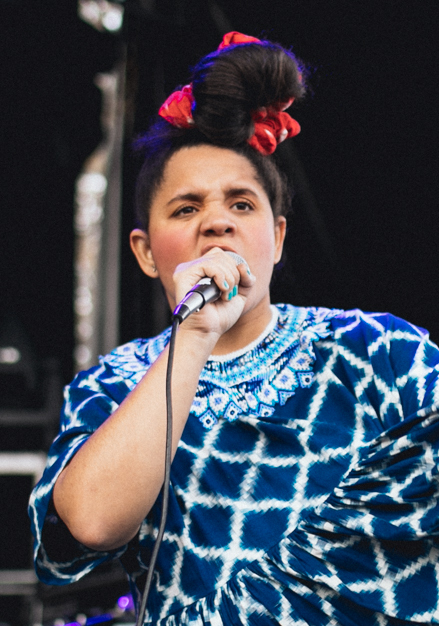
- Pimienta in 2018

Background information
- Born: Lido Maria Pimienta Paz; 20 December 1986 (age 39); Barranquilla, Colombia
- Origin: Toronto, Ontario, Canada
- Genres: Synthpop; Latin pop; art pop; cumbia; bullerengue
- Occupations: Musician; singer; songwriter
- Years active: 2010–present
- Website: lidopimienta.com

Lido Pimienta (born 20 December 1986) is a Colombian Canadian musician, singer, and songwriter. She rose to prominence after her 2016 album, La Papessa, won the 2017 Polaris Music Prize. Her music incorporates a variety of styles and influences, including traditional indigenous and Afro-Colombian musical styles such as cumbia and bullerengue, as well as contemporary synthpop and electronic music.

== Early life ==
Originally from Barranquilla, Colombia, she later immigrated to Canada, settling in London, Ontario, before moving to Toronto, where she is currently based. Her father died when she was six years old.

== Career ==
Pimienta released her debut album, Color, in 2010. The album was produced by Michael Ramey, Pimienta's husband at the time, and was released by Los Angeles–based music label Kudeta. After Pimienta and Ramey separated, Pimienta took time to pursue a degree in art criticism, in addition to learning more about music production, before releasing her second album, La Papessa, in 2016. That year, she also collaborated with The Halluci Nation (formerly A Tribe Called Red) on several tracks for their 2016 album We Are the Halluci Nation.

Following the release of her experimental album La Papessa, which was self-produced by Pimienta, she was awarded the 2017 Polaris Music Prize, which is considered Canada's top juried music award. The Globe and Mail called her "the future of Canadian rock and roll", and dubbed her the "artist of the year".

There was controversy surrounding her performance at the Halifax Pop Explosion music festival on October 19, 2017. Pimienta, as she often does during her concerts, invited the "girls to the front," asking that the men move back, and that white women let through the women of color. Some audience members saw the request as racist, and a white volunteer photographer refused to move from her spot near the stage where she just propelled herself. When the photographer refused to move after repeated requests, Pimienta said, "you're cutting into my set time and you're disrespecting these women, and I don't have time for this". The photographer was removed from the show and the festival organizers later apologized to Pimienta, saying they would increase "anti-oppression and anti-racism training".

In addition to working as a musician, Pimienta is also a visual artist and curator, and her work has been described as exploring "the politics of gender, race, motherhood, identity and the construct of the Canadian landscape in the Latin American"; her work was exhibited in the group exhibition Feministry Is Here at Mercer Union gallery in Toronto.

She later in 2020 released Miss Colombia, her follow up studio album to her award-winning album La Papessa. The title was derived from the Miss Universe 2015 beauty pageant incident, which sparked an outrage from the Colombian people. This prompted her to reflect on many things like her Colombian heritage and pride, and caused her to fall into a depression. Many themes and ideas surrounding the album, Miss Colombia, are a reflection on this outrage and depression, as Get In Her Ears states a "vivid celebration (and criticism) of her Colombian heritage".

Pimienta created a television program titled Lido TV. The show premiered at the Toronto International Film Festival on September 11, 2022. Following its premiere, the show was available to stream on CBC Gem beginning September 23, 2022. Press coverage describes Lido TV as a variety show that will explore themes that include feminism, colonialism, privilege, beauty, success, and hate. The show's format will include documentary footage, interviews, sketch comedy, and puppetry performances that are hosted, written, and produced by Pimienta.

Pimienta's fourth studio album La Belleza was released in May 2025. Ammar Kalia of The Guardian described it as a "nine-track orchestral suite touching on everything from Gregorian chant to strings-laden love songs and dembow rhythms."

== Personal life ==
Pimienta is queer. She is of mixed Afro-Colombian and Wayuu descent. She is a single parent.

Pimienta is close friends with Canadian singer-songwriter Nelly Furtado and with Li Saumet, lead singer of Colombian band Bomba Estéreo.

== Discography ==
- Color (2010)
- La Papessa (2016)
- Miss Colombia (2020)
- La Belleza (2025)
- Caribenya (2026)

== Awards and nominations ==
List of awards and nominations received by Lido Pimienta
Association	Year	Category	Nominated work	Result	Ref.
Latin Grammy Awards	2020	Best Alternative Music Album	Miss Colombia	Nominated	
Grammy Awards	2021	Best Latin Rock, Urban, or Alternative Album	Miss Colombia	Nominated	
Juno Awards	2021	Recording Package of the Year	Miss Colombia with Orly Anan, Mat Dunlap, Daniela Murillo	Nominated	
Juno Awards	2026	Latin Music Recording of the Year	La Belleza	Nominated	
Polaris Music Prize	2017		La Papessa	Won	
Polaris Music Prize	2020		Miss Colombia	Nominated	
