= Joli Mai =

Studio album by Daphni
- Released: October 6, 2017
- Length: 59:44
- Label: Jiaolong (Self-released)

Daphni chronology
FabricLive.93 (2017)	Joli Mai (2017)	Cherry (2022)

Professional ratings
Aggregate scores
Source	Rating
Metacritic	78/100
Review scores
Source	Rating
AllMusic	4/5 stars
Clash	8/10
Exclaim!	8/10

Joli Mai is the eighth studio album by Canadian musician Dan Snaith, and third album under the moniker Daphni. It was self-released through Snaith's label Jiaolong on October 6, 2017, and includes tracks from his FabricLive.93 contribution.

== Accolades ==
Publication	Accolade	Rank	Ref.
Exclaim!	Top 10 Dance/Electronic Albums of 2017	10	
Rolling Stone	Top 20 EDM/Electronic Albums of 2017	5	

== Track listing ==
No.	Title	Length
1.	"Poly"	2:18
2.	"Face to Face"	5:42
3.	"Carry On"	3:46
4.	"Vulture"	4:34
5.	"Xing Tian"	4:56
6.	"Vikram"	5:40
7.	"Tin"	4:34
8.	"The Truth"	6:30
9.	"Hey Drum"	6:50
10.	"Medellin"	6:14
11.	"Joli Mai"	4:50
12.	"Life's What You Make It"	3:50
