= Up in Flames (album) =

Studio album by Manitoba
- Released: March 31, 2003
- Genres: Shoegaze; Neo-psychedelia; Folktronica; indie pop
- Length: 39:02
- Labels: The Leaf Label; Domino
- Producer: Dan Snaith

Manitoba / Dan Snaith chronology
Start Breaking My Heart (2001)	Up in Flames (2003)	The Milk of Human Kindness (2005)

Singles from Up in Flames
- 1. "Jacknuggeted" Released: February 23, 2003; 2. "Hendrix with Ko" Released: August 12, 2003

Up in Flames is the second studio album by Canadian musician Dan Snaith, released under the moniker Manitoba on March 31, 2003, by The Leaf Label and Domino Recording Company. It is Snaith's second and final album credited under Manitoba, and received critical acclaim when it was released.

In 2006, a special edition of Up in Flames was released. In 2013, the album was reissued under Snaith's current moniker, Caribou, and in 2015, it was selected by fans as one of ten albums re-issued by The Leaf Label as part of the label's 20th anniversary celebrations. This saw the album released on limited edition double vinyl and made available to fans via the PledgeMusic service.

News program Democracy Now! uses "Kid You'll Move Mountains" as part of their regular theme music.

== Reception ==
Professional ratings
Aggregate scores
Source	Rating
Metacritic	88/100
Review scores
Source	Rating
AllMusic	4.5/5 stars
Alternative Press	5/5
Entertainment Weekly	A−
Mojo	4/5 stars
Muzik	4/5 stars
Pitchfork	8.6/10 (2003); 9.0/10 (2006)
PopMatters	8/10
Q	2/5 stars
Stylus Magazine	A
Uncut	4/5 stars

Up in Flames received acclaim from critics and has been assigned a score of 88 based on 20 critic reviews, translating to "universal acclaim", from Metacritic. Online magazine Pitchfork placed Up in Flames at number 106 on its list of top 200 albums of the 2000s.

== Track listing ==
All tracks are written by Dan Snaith, except where noted.

No.	Title	Writer(s)	Length
1.	"I've Lived on a Dirt Road All My Life"		5:35
2.	"Skunks"		3:45
3.	"Hendrix with Ko"	Snaith; Koushik Ghosh	3:57
4.	"Jacknuggeted"		3:29
5.	"Why the Long Face"		0:44
6.	"Bijoux"		4:18
7.	"Twins"		1:46
8.	"Kid You'll Move Mountains"		5:01
9.	"Crayon"	Snaith; Ghosh	2:40
10.	"Every Time She Turns Round It's Her Birthday"		7:47
Total length:			39:02

2006 reissue bonus disc
No.	Title	Length
1.	"Cherrybomb"	5:00
2.	"Silver Splinters"	4:33
3.	"Olé"	4:33
4.	"Thistles and Felt"	2:32
5.	"Seaweed"	6:19
6.	"Cherrybomb Part II"	4:36
Total length:		27:33

== Charts ==
Chart (2003)	Peak position
UK Albums (Official Charts)	155
UK Independent Albums (Official Charts)	15
