= The Milk of Human Kindness =

Studio album by Caribou
- Released: April 18, 2005
- Genre: Folktronica
- Length: 40:07
- Label: The Leaf Label; Domino
- Producer: Dan Snaith

Caribou / Dan Snaith chronology
Up in Flames (2003)	The Milk of Human Kindness (2005)	Andorra (2007)

Singles from The Milk of Human Kindness
- 1. "Yeti" Released: March 22, 2005; 2. "Barnowl" Released: July 1, 2005

Professional ratings
Aggregate scores
Source	Rating
Metacritic	81/100
Review scores
Source	Rating
AllMusic	3/5 stars
The Boston Phoenix	3/4 stars
Drowned in Sound	8/10
Mojo	4/5 stars
NME	8/10
Pitchfork	8.5/10
PopMatters	8/10
Q	3/5 stars
Uncut	3/5 stars
URB	4.5/5 stars

The Milk of Human Kindness is the third studio album by Canadian musician Dan Snaith, released under the moniker Caribou on April 18, 2005, by The Leaf Label and Domino Recording Company. It is Snaith's first album credited under Caribou, with Snaith having dropped his previous moniker Manitoba following the release of Up in Flames in 2003 due to a threatened lawsuit by Handsome Dick Manitoba of The Dictators.

While the title is a quote from William Shakespeare's play Macbeth, Snaith has been quoted as saying that he read it off the back of a milk truck. The album received critical acclaim.

In 2009, Seattle emcee producer Ryan Lewis sampled the song "Subotnik" for "Vipassana", the first track on their critically acclaimed project, The VS. EP.

== Track listing ==
All tracks are written by Dan Snaith, except where noted.

No.	Title	Writer(s)	Length
1.	"Yeti"		5:01
2.	"Subotnick"	Snaith; Bert Keyes; Sylvia Robinson	1:05
3.	"A Final Warning"		7:15
4.	"Lord Leopard"		1:37
5.	"Bees"		5:23
6.	"Hands First"		0:29
7.	"Hello Hammerheads"		2:42
8.	"Brahminy Kite"		5:22
9.	"Drumheller"		1:33
10.	"Pelican Narrows"		3:50
11.	"Barnowl"		5:50
Total length:			40:07

Sample credits

- "Subotnick" contains samples of "Love on a Two-Way Street", written by Bert Keyes and Sylvia Robinson and performed by The Moments.

== Charts ==
Chart (2005)	Peak position
UK Independent Albums (OCC)	29
