= Our Love (Caribou album) =

Studio album by Caribou
- Released: October 6, 2014
- Genres: Electronic; house
- Length: 41:53
- Labels: City Slang; Merge
- Producer: Dan Snaith

Caribou chronology
| Jiaolong (2012) | Our Love (2014) | Suddenly (2020) |

Singles from Our Love
- 1. "Can't Do Without You" Released: June 3, 2014; 2. "Our Love" Released: September 2014; 3. "Your Love Will Set You Free" Released: 2014

Our Love is the seventh studio album by Canadian musician Dan Snaith, released under the moniker Caribou on October 6, 2014 by City Slang and October 7, 2014 by Merge. It is Snaith's fourth album as Caribou, having released his previous album, Jiaolong, as Daphni in 2012. It features collaborations with Jessy Lanza and Owen Pallett.

The album reflects on the success of Snaith's breakthrough album, Swim, four years prior. The lyrics are more personal and reflective than his previous albums, influenced by the birth of his daughter. It is an electronic album with R&B and hip hop influences.

Following the less positive reception of Jiaolong, Our Love debuted to critical acclaim, with praise for its subtle composition and themes. The album appeared on numerous end-of-year lists, was nominated for the Grammy Award for Best Dance/Electronic Album at the 58th Annual Grammy Awards and was shortlisted for the 2015 Polaris Music Prize. It peaked at No. 46 on the Billboard 200 and No. 8 on the UK Albums Chart.

== Production ==
The album title reflects the success of Swim. Snaith said "the primary impulse on this record was to make something that was generous in the sense that it was for everybody, not just for me locked in a studio by myself." The album features contributions from Jessy Lanza and Owen Pallett.

Our Love contains R&B and hip hop influences. Snaith described the lyrics as being more personal compared to previous Caribou releases, saying "Part of it's just getting older and being more reflective, thinking, 'What is it that I want to have in my music when I look back on it? What are the things that matter to me?' And they are clichéd things: the love in my life, whether that be my family or my friends." Snaith cited the birth of his daughter as a major reason for the more personal lyrics.

== Release ==
The album's first single, "Can't Do Without You", was made available for free online on June 3, followed by "Our Love" on August 18, 2014. A music video for "Our Love", directed by Ryan Staake, was released on October 7, 2014.

== Reception ==
Professional ratings
Aggregate scores
| Source | Rating |
|---|---|
| AnyDecentMusic? | 8.0/10 |
| Metacritic | 84/100 |
Review scores
| Source | Rating |
| AllMusic | 4/5 stars |
| The Daily Telegraph | 4/5 stars |
| The Guardian | 5/5 stars |
| Mixmag | 4/5 |
| Mojo | 4/5 stars |
| NME | 9/10 |
| Pitchfork | 8.6/10 |
| Q | 4/5 stars |
| Rolling Stone | 3.5/5 stars |
| Uncut | 9/10 |

On Metacritic, Our Love has a Metascore of 84 based on 33 reviews, indicating "universal acclaim". Alexis Petridis of The Guardian praised the album as "rich, strange, endlessly fascinating music" and "a subtle, beautiful triumph." Pitchfork's Jamieson Cox chose the album as that week's "Best New Music" and called it "a very assured record, from its unconventional, austere arrangements to its unrelenting focus and thematic consistency." Fred Thomas of AllMusic wrote that Our Love "stands as the most straightforwardly danceable Caribou album to date, but holds on to both the experimental bent and composition-minded musicality that helped build the project's one-of-a-kind sound world." Drowned in Sound's Alex Baker said that while the album "lacks the element of surprise that Swim had," Our Love "holds in abundance all the hallmarks of a master: so rich, so textured and despite being predominantly electronic, so human."

In a mixed review, Andrew Ryce of Resident Advisor called Our Love "a grower" and wrote that he had "come to appreciate its nuanced production, even on songs that initially fell flat," but nonetheless felt underwhelmed. Slant Magazine's Jesse Cataldo criticized the album's "dreary" sound, writing that the album lacked "the nervous energy and addictive grooves of 2010's Swim or the sample-based bounciness of Snaith's recent side project, Daphni."

=== Accolades ===
Our Love appeared on numerous end-of-year charts. Consequence of Sound ranked the album at number five on their list of the top 50 albums of 2014, writing "As the world goes electronic, artists must work even harder to maintain the humanity that brings so many people together through music. Our Love is proof that artists can adopt timeless dance floor tactics without losing themselves in the hysteria." The Guardian also ranked the album at number five on their end-of-year list, writing "Our Love ran far deeper than most dance records, exploring the complexities of adult relationships: new fatherhood, friends' divorces and even death." The album was nominated for the 2015 Polaris Music Prize shortlist.

== Track listing ==
All tracks are written by Dan Snaith, except where noted.

| No. | Title | Writer(s) | Length |
|---|---|---|---|
| 1. | "Can't Do Without You" | | 3:56 |
| 2. | "Silver" | | 5:16 |
| 3. | "All I Ever Need" | | 3:52 |
| 4. | "Our Love" | | 5:34 |
| 5. | "Dive" | | 2:06 |
| 6. | "Second Chance" | Snaith; Jessy Lanza | 4:00 |
| 7. | "Julia Brightly" | | 2:03 |
| 8. | "Mars" | | 5:45 |
| 9. | "Back Home" | | 3:33 |
| 10. | "Your Love Will Set You Free" | Snaith; Owen Pallett | 5:47 |
| Total length: | | | 41:53 |

Expanded edition bonus tracks
| No. | Title | Writer(s) | Length |
|---|---|---|---|
| 11. | "Can't Do Without You" (Extended Mix) | | 6:34 |
| 12. | "Your Love Will Set You Free" (C2's Set U Free Remix) | Snaith; Pallett | 6:42 |
| 13. | "Second Chance" (Cyril Hahn Edit) | Snaith; Lanza | 4:46 |
| 14. | "Mars" (Head High's Core Remix) | | 4:54 |
| 15. | "Mars" (Head High's Venus Remix) | | 5:39 |
| 16. | "Our Love" (Daphni Remix) | | 7:08 |
| 17. | "Can't Do Without You" (Tale of Us & Mano Le Tough Remix) | | 7:37 |

== Personnel ==
Credits adapted from AllMusic.

- Matthew Cooper – design
- Jason Evans – art direction, design, photography
- Bo Kondren – mastering
- Jessy Lanza – composition, vocals
- Owen Pallett – composition, viola, violin
- Dan Snaith – composition, production
- David Wrench – mixing

== Charts ==
=== Weekly charts ===
| Chart (2014) | Peak position |
|---|---|
| Australian Albums (ARIA) | 26 |
| Austrian Albums (Ö3 Austria) | 27 |
| Belgian Albums (Ultratop Flanders) | 15 |
| Belgian Albums (Ultratop Wallonia) | 26 |
| Canadian Albums (Billboard) | 19 |
| Dutch Albums (Album Top 100) | 64 |
| French Albums (SNEP) | 37 |
| German Albums (Offizielle Top 100) | 34 |
| Swiss Albums (Schweizer Hitparade) | 17 |
| UK Albums (Official Charts) | 8 |
| UK Dance Albums (Official Charts) | 2 |
| US Billboard 200 | 46 |
| US Independent Albums (Billboard) | 9 |
| US Top Alternative Albums (Billboard) | 8 |
| US Top Dance Albums (Billboard) | 2 |

=== Year-end charts ===
| Chart (2015) | Position |
|---|---|
| US Top Dance/Electronic Albums (Billboard) | 23 |
