= Start Breaking My Heart =

Studio album by Manitoba
- Released: March 27, 2001
- Genre: IDM; electronica
- Length: 45:37
- Label: The Leaf Label
- Producer: Dan Snaith

Manitoba / Dan Snaith chronology
Start Breaking My Heart (2001)	Up in Flames (2003)

Singles from Start Breaking My Heart
- 1. "People Eating Fruit" Released: October 30, 2000; 2. "Paul's Birthday" Released: February 26, 2001

Professional ratings
Aggregate scores
Source	Rating
Metacritic	76/100
Review scores
Source	Rating
AllMusic	3.5/5 stars
Alternative Press	4/5
Muzik	4/5
NME	8/10
Pitchfork	8.0/10 (2002); 7.9/10 (2006)

Start Breaking My Heart is the debut studio album by Canadian musician Dan Snaith, released under the moniker Manitoba on March 27, 2001, by The Leaf Label.

The album received positive reviews and was re-released in 2006 by Domino Recording Company after Snaith started performing under the new moniker Caribou. The styles and themes of the album have been compared to those of Boards of Canada, Four Tet, and Aphex Twin.

In 2017, Pitchfork placed the album at number 40 on its list of "The 50 Best IDM Albums of All Time".

== Track listing ==
All tracks are written by Dan Snaith

No.	Title	Length
1.	"Dundas, Ontario"	4:23
2.	"People Eating Fruit"	6:11
3.	"Mammals vs. Reptiles"	4:47
4.	"Brandon"	5:23
5.	"Children Play Well Together"	3:06
6.	"Lemon Yoghourt"	2:24
7.	"James' Second Haircut"	4:15
8.	"Schedules and Fares"	5:13
9.	"Pauls Birthday"	6:56
10.	"Happy Ending"	2:59
Total length:		45:37

2002 reissue bonus tracks
No.	Title	Length
11.	"Dundas, Ontario" (Remix)	5:09
12.	"Tits & Ass: The Great Canadian Weekend"	4:46
13.	"Webers"	5:26
Total length:		60:58

2006 reissue bonus disc
No.	Title	Length
1.	"Victor and Carolyn"	5:59
2.	"218 Beverly"	5:32
3.	"Evan Likes Driving"	10:09
4.	"Anna and Nina"	5:42
5.	"Dundas, Ontario" (Remix)	5:09
6.	"Tits & Ass: The Great Canadian Weekend"	4:46
7.	"Webers"	5:26
8.	"If Assholes Could Fly, This Place Would Be an Airport"	4:50
9.	"Air Doom"	2:30
10.	"Ach Who"	7:34
Total length:		57:37

== Personnel ==
Credits adapted from liner notes.

- Dan Snaith – writing, production
- Jay Burnett – mastering
- Ben Dunbar – photography
- EkhornFross – design
