= Priori (musician) =

Canadian dub techno producer

- Also known as: RED
- Born: Francis Latreille
- Origin: Montreal, Quebec, Canada
- Genres: Dub techno; tech house; ambient; drum and bass
- Occupations: Record producer; DJ
- Label: NAFF
- Member of: Jump Source

Priori is the stage name of Francis Latreille, a Canadian electronic musician and dub techno producer from Montreal, Quebec. He is most noted for his 2024 album This But More, which won the Juno Award for Electronic Album of the Year at the Juno Awards of 2025.

== Career ==
Latreille released his debut album, On a Nimbus, in 2019. He followed it with Your Own Power in 2021 and with This But More in 2024, which won the Juno Award for Electronic Album of the Year in 2025. The same year he received the Electronic Music Award at the SOCAN Gala.

Alongside his solo work, he runs the label NAFF with Ex-Terrestrial, and forms the duo Jump Source with Patrick Holland; their debut album, Fold, was released in April 2026.

== Discography ==
=== Albums ===
- On a Nimbus (2019)
- Your Own Power (2021)
- Nigh (2022), as RED
- This But More (2024)

=== With Jump Source ===
- Fold (2026)
