= La Papessa (album) =

Studio album by Lido Pimienta
- Released: 2016
- Genre: Latin; electronic
- Length: 37:32
- Label: Anti-
- Producer: Lido Pimienta

Lido Pimienta chronology
Color (2010)	La Papessa (2016)	Miss Colombia (2020)

La Papessa is the second album by Colombian-Canadian electronic musician Lido Pimienta, released in 2016. It was named the winner of the 2017 Polaris Music Prize.

Guest musicians on the album include Andrea Echeverri and Melody McKiver.

== Track listing ==
1. "Agua" – 4:20
2. "La Capacidad" – 4:18
3. "Quiero Que Te Vaya Bien (QQTVB)" – 3:27
4. "Ruleta" – 4:13
5. "Al Unisono Viajan" – 4:23
6. "Para Quererte" – 4:10
7. "Fornicarte Es Un Arte" (featuring Melody McKiver) – 4:44
8. "En Un Minuto" (featuring Andrea Echeverri) – 3:44
9. "Quiero Jardines" – 4:13
