= Andorra (album) =

Studio album by Caribou
- Released: August 17, 2007
- Genres: Psychedelic pop; electronica; neo-psychedelia; dream pop
- Length: 43:00
- Labels: City Slang; Merge
- Producer: Dan Snaith

Caribou chronology
The Milk of Human Kindness (2005)	Andorra (2007)	Swim (2010)

Singles from Andorra
- 1. "Melody Day" Released: July 10, 2007; 2. "She's the One" Released: November 26, 2007; 3. "Eli" Released: 2008

Professional ratings
Aggregate scores
Source	Rating
Metacritic	83/100
Review scores
Source	Rating
AllMusic	4.5/5 stars
The A.V. Club	A−
Entertainment Weekly	A−
Mojo	4/5 stars
NME	8/10
The Observer	4/5 stars
Pitchfork	8.3/10
Rolling Stone	3.5/5 stars
Spin	3/5 stars
Uncut	4/5 stars

Andorra is the fourth studio album by Canadian musician Dan Snaith, released under the stage name Caribou. It is Snaith's fourth album and his second as Caribou, following The Milk of Human Kindness. It was released in Germany on August 17, 2007 and in the United Kingdom on August 20 by City Slang, and in the United States on August 21 by Merge.

Andorra received critical acclaim and won the 2008 Polaris Music Prize.

== Track listing ==
All tracks are written by Dan Snaith.

No.	Title	Length
1.	"Melody Day"	4:11
2.	"Sandy"	4:10
3.	"After Hours"	6:15
4.	"She's the One"	4:00
5.	"Desiree"	4:12
6.	"Eli"	3:03
7.	"Sundialing"	4:40
8.	"Irene"	3:38
9.	"Niobe"	8:51
Total length:		43:00

== Charts ==
Chart (2007)	Peak position
US Billboard 200	197
US Heatseekers Albums (Billboard)	5
US Independent Albums (Billboard)	26
