= Attlas =

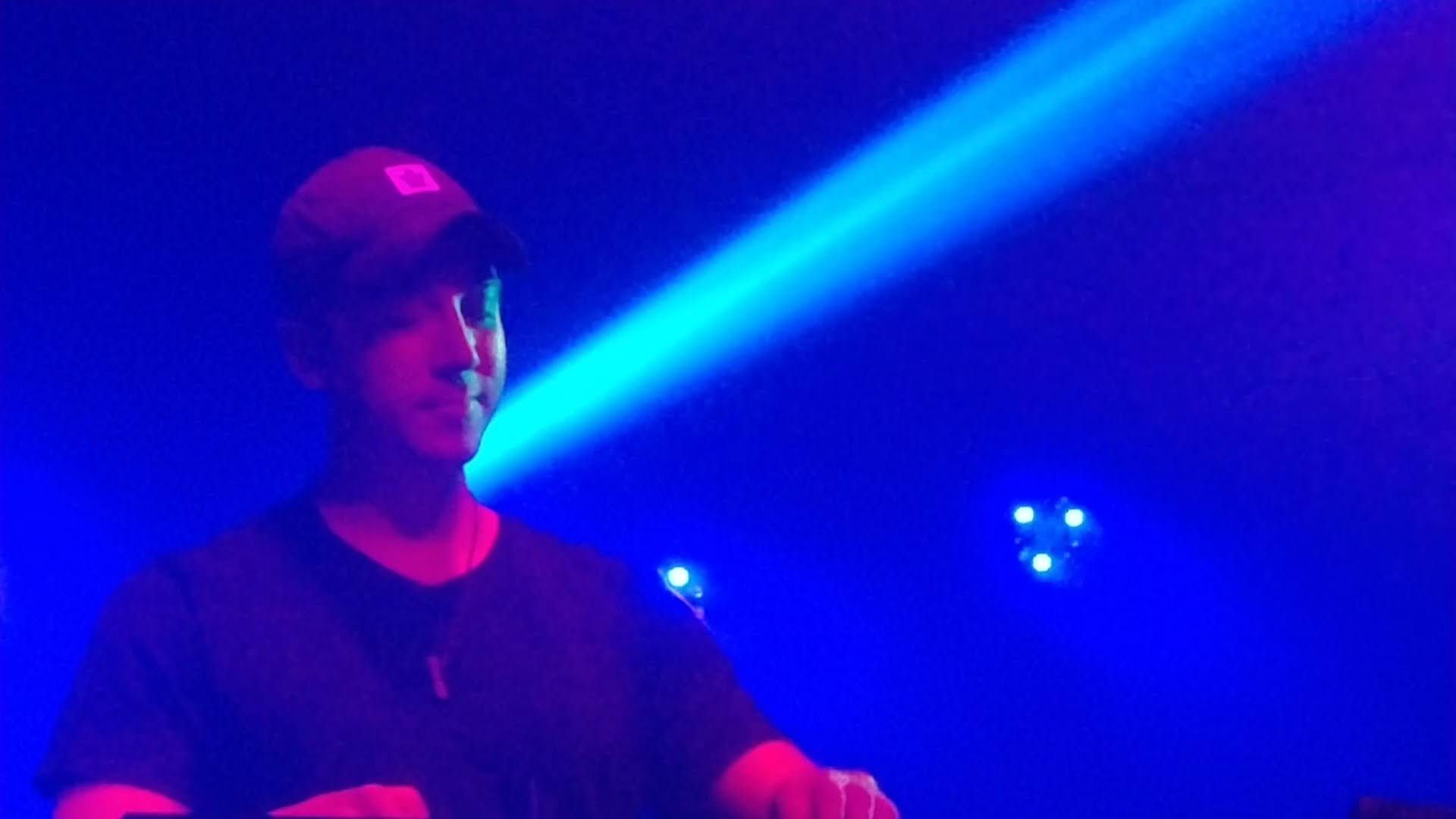
- Hartford performing live in July 2021

Background information
- Born: Jeffrey Hartford; Toronto, Ontario, Canada
- Genre: Electronic ⋅ ambient ⋅ progressive house ⋅ synthwave ⋅ trip hop
- Occupations: DJ; producer; musician
- Instruments: Piano, guitar, keyboard, digital audio workstation
- Years active: 2014-present
- Labels: Mau5trap, Monstercat, Nettwerk, This Never Happened
- Member of: Sun Lo

Jeff Hartford, better known by his stage name Attlas (stylized as ATTLAS), is a Canadian DJ, electronic music producer and musician. Hartford is known for his progressive house and electronica releases on the electronic label mau5trap and has often appeared in the label's We are Friends album series. He has released four albums, five extended plays, and several other singles and has received two Juno Award nominations over the course of his career. He is also half of the group Sun Lo with Richard Walters. Hartford's fourth solo album, SWAN, was released on September 25, 2026.

== Early life ==
Born in Toronto, Hartford grew up surrounded by a variety of musical influences, including New Orleans jazz, Beethoven, hip-hop, and hard rock. After moving to Detroit, he learned to play a piano that was left in the basement of his home and began composing his own music. Later, an interest in electronic music was fostered by listening to productions from Matt Lange, Deadmau5, and various artists from Warp Records. Before releasing his own music under the name Attlas, Hartford worked on film scores with composer Trevor Morris.

== Career ==
=== 2014-2015: Debut extended plays and deadmau5 alias rumors ===
Hartford self-released a remix he had made of the Deadmau5 song "Aural Psynapse" in November 2014, which almost immediately gained attention and led to rumors being spread about the identity of the producer. Thanks to this positive attention Hartford decided to send his music to mau5trap, who signed him. He said the moniker "ATTLAS" was a mask that he could put on to assume a new identity and separate his music from his personal self. The name was chosen both because the ambiguity would allow him to cover a variety of sounds, and because of the influence that physical and emotional geographies, histories, and stories have on his writing.

During the period when Hartford's songs were first released on mau5trap, a rumor circulated online that Attlas was a side project of Joel Zimmerman aka Deadmau5 akin to the Testpilot moniker Zimmerman debuted also in 2014. Some even theorized that the name was a reference to the video game Bioshock and was a clue to the secret nature of the project. Although he mentioned his first name in some interviews, the true identity of Attlas was not fully known until Pete Tong revealed it on his Evolution broadcast on iHeartRadio. Tong said "There's been a sneaky suspicion that he's deadmau5 in disguise. However I can now reveal that he's a fellow Canadian producer called Jeff Hartford."

Speaking about the beginning of his career and how fans assumed he was an alias of deadmau5, Hartford said:

"When I sent my music to deadmau5's label and he chose to release it, people started assuming that my music was actually his side project... That response was such a big compliment to me... because Joel has always been a huge inspiration. But while it was fun for a bit, I suddenly thought about how I had to start being Jeff, so that I wasn't being disrespectful to the brand that deadmau5 has built over the years."

In 2015, Hartford released the singles "Scarlett", "Wastaga" and "Beside". These tracks were later included in a femme fatale-inspired EP trilogy consisting of Siren EP, Scene EP and Sin EP released through mau5trap throughout the year alongside an official release of his "Aural Psynapse" remix. Collaborators on these EPs included Kristian Attard on the song "Batch", Charlie Thorpe on "Jagged", and Chelsea Jade on "Parallel Lines". Hartford also performed his first live shows under the name Attlas in June.

=== 2016-2017: Bloom EP and other singles ===
In February 2016, Hartford joined other mau5trap label artists on the MAU5HAX BU5 TOUR across the United States. He then released the single "Aspen" in April. After a brief hiatus, he released another single, "Ryat", in June ahead of the full Bloom EP, a self-described collection of calm, fresh air and vocal collaborations. The EP saw general praise, and the track "I Need You More" was recognized on Billboard's Top 25 Relaxing & Calming Songs to Chill To playlist in 2017. Later in 2016, Hartford was named in Billboard's "One to Watch" and released the song "Blood Work" in November. At the end of 2016, Hartford embarked on a seven show tour across Canada and the United States to promote the second installment of his Storyline mix series and closed the year out by giving away the song "Thanks" for free to his SoundCloud followers as a way of expressing gratitude for his fans.

In 2017, Hartford released the singles "Frost", "Further", and "What You Do To Me". A collaboration with deadmau5 titled "bad at titles" was included on mau5trap's We are Friends, Vol. 6 compilation and received positive attention.

=== 2018-2019: Charcoal Halo ===
Hartford continued releasing various singles on mau5trap throughout 2018. "You (Close)", "Treehouse", "Want", and "Courante" were all released as separate singles before the announcement of the extended play Charcoal Halo. None of the previous singles from 2017 or 2018 were included on this EP. Hartford described the December release as an exploration of the balance between relying on experience and learning from self-reflection. Charcoal Halo was one of the first instances of Hartford re-sampling his own demos into new tracks, a technique that would feature heavily on later releases. The tone of the whole EP departed from the darker and more serious energy of the previous EPs but maintained the lush layering that Hartford had become known for. It also included a vocal feature from singer 7Chariot on the song "Coldest Night".

Near the end of 2019, Hartford suffered an accident related to his foot that made activities like hiking, songwriting, and occasionally even sleep impossible for a time. Some of the ideas that came from this hardship eventually found their way onto later tracks, such as "Polar Concept" from his second album, Out Here with You.

=== 2020-2021: Lavender God, Out Here with You, and other singles ===
On November 17, 2019, Hartford announced via Twitter that he would be releasing his first full-length album early the following year. "Sinner Complicated", the first single from the album was unveiled on December 6, 2019, and was accompanied by a visualizer made by digital artist Cyclo. The following January saw the release of the second single, "Hotel" featuring Maylyn. The full album released in February, to positive reviews, being called "stunning", "soothing", "cinematic", and "an unprecedented adventure" by some. Lavender God featured collaborations with Lambert, Maylyn, and Alisa Xayalith (of The Naked and Famous fame) and would go on to be nominated for the Juno Award for Electronic Album of the Year. A tour to support the album was planned, but most events were canceled due to the spread of COVID-19 across North America. Hartford also released several other singles in the months following: the self-release "The Night Air was Cool" in July and the double single "Faya/The Crack" via Lane 8's record label This Never Happened in September.

Much to the surprise of fans, Hartford announced later that year that another album would be released in November 2020, less than a year after his debut album. This new album, titled Out Here with You, would see largely positive reviews and would also receive a Juno nomination for Electronic Album of the Year. Many of the songs on this album were the result of reflecting on the isolation during the pandemic as well as other positive and negative experiences in Hartford's life.

The following year, Hartford self-released a number of singles. To celebrate Piano Day in March, he released the instrumental track "86cc". June brought "Long Way Home", a collaboration with Anjunadeep's Oliver Wickham. A visualizer for the song was once again created by Cyclo. In August, Hartford released "Into Arms of Lovers" featuring Maylyn. The song had been in the works for a while, with Hartford often playing earlier versions in live sets. He called the song "an effort of passion and patience" and "an honest final product".

=== 2022-2023: Carry it with You, Sun Lo, and Monstercat releases ===
Mid-February 2022, the Attlas and mau5trap Twitter pages both announced that Hartford's third album, titled Carry it with You, would be released on March 11 and would be preceded by the single "Waterbug" on February 25. Hartford remarked that the album would be very personal, emotional, and vulnerable. Songs from the album were meant to convey a broad range of emotions, from dread and hope, to failure and frustration, to brutal honesty with oneself. Hartford listed a number of influences that contributed to the songs on Carry it with You, including the bands Boards of Canada, Prince of Denmark, Modern Baseball, O'Flynn, Vessels, and the painter William Kurelek, The album received praise for the emotional depth conveyed and the diversity of sounds.

After featuring in a remix of Rolo Tomassi's song "Closer" in July, Hartford announced that he would be releasing a collaboration with producer Mango (Alexey Golovanov) titled "Over the Water" on the label Monstercat. Appearing on the Silk sublabel, the producers described the song as an exploration of and reflection on nature, namely Lake Huron. Both were satisfied with the blend of styles on the track and attributed some of the success to the vocals contributed by singer Maylyn, who had worked with Hartford previously.

In September the same year, Hartford tweeted that a new vocal-focused album was coming soon, which confirmed hints that he had dropped previously. This new material was later announced to be a collaboration with British singer-songwriter Richard Walters and would be released under the name Sun Lo. The duo released their debut single "Factory Gates" in November 2022 under Netwerk Music Group and followed it with "Nothing Permanent" in December the same year. Several more singles were released before the group announced their debut album Shapes in My Head would be released in April 2023. The duo explained that this album was heavily inspired by Kazuo Ishiguro's novel Klara and the Sun as well as the relationships between people and AI that evolved during the pandemic. One review for the album said it was "cinematic, highly emotional, and show[ed] off the innate artistry that ATTLAS and Richard Walters possess."

In June 2023, Harford released his second single on the label Monstercat, titled "Used to the Silence". He credited much of the success of the song to collaborator Jodie Knight, who provided vocals. This was followed by the tracks "A Game of Faries" in September and "The One" the following February, also through Monstercat.

=== 2024-present: Life After Death and SWAN ===
Hartford took to social media in November 2024, explaining that the previous several months had been marked by life-altering trials including back and leg injuries that left him unable to run, heartbreak, and even near-death experiences. After new procedures in October, Harford began to heal in a way that allowed him to walk and sit at a desk again. To both celebrate and help kick-start new creative ideas, he announced that he would be posting a new demo to SoundCloud every day for the following 30 days. The compilation would later be titled Life After Death: 30 Songs 30 Days.

In 2026, Hartford announced via Instagram that a new album, titled SWAN, would release later that year. The album would feature updated versions of several Life After Death tracks as well as new tracks not previously released. The album was preceded by the singles "Elora", "SWAN", "Twin Snakes", and "Morning Prayer". The single "Angel Montreal", another collaboration with Mango, was also released in 2026.

== Discography ==
=== Albums ===
Title	Details
Lavender God	Released: January 31, 2020; Label: mau5trap; Format: Digital download
Out Here with You	Released: November 6, 2020; Label: mau5trap; Format: Digital download
Carry it with You	Released: March 11, 2022; Label: mau5trap; Format: Digital download
SWAN	Released: September 25, 2026; Label: Tether Records; Format: Digital download, vinyl

==== As Sun Lo ====
Title	Details
Shapes in My Head	April 28, 2023; Label: Nettwerk; Format: Digital download

=== Extended plays ===
Title	Details	Charts
Title	Details	US Dance
Siren EP	Released: March 30, 2015; Label: mau5trap; Format: Digital download	—
Scene EP	Released: August 7, 2015; Label: mau5trap; Format: Digital download	—
Sin EP	Released: November 20, 2015; Label: mau5trap; Format: Digital download	—
Bloom EP	Released: July 22, 2016; Label: mau5trap; Format: Digital download	20
Charcoal Halo	Released: December 11, 2018; Label: mau5trap; Format: Digital download	—
Half Light (Remixes)	Released: August 18, 2020; Label: mau5trap; Format: Digital download	—

=== Compilations ===
Title	Details
Life After Death: 30 Songs 30 Days	December 22, 2024; Format: Digital

=== Singles and other songs ===
Year	Title	Other notes
2015	"Sabs"	Released on mau5trap's We are Friends, Vol. 3 compilation
2015	"Scarlett"	First single from Siren EP
2015	"Boxed"	Released on mau5trap's We are Friends, Vol. 4 compilation
2016	"Sunset over Manaan"	Released on Star Wars Headspace compilation
2016	"Aspen"	Included "Aspen (Club Mix)"
2016	"Ryat"	First single from Bloom EP
2016	"Crawl"	Released on mau5trap's We are Friends, Vol. 5 compilation
2016	"Blood Work"	
2016	"Thanks"	
2017	"Frost"	
2017	"Further"	
2017	"What You Do to Me"	
2017	"Bad at Titles" (with deadmau5)	Released on mau5trap's We are Friends, Vol. 6 compilation
2017	"Cold Mountain Air"	Released on mau5trap's We are Friends, Vol. 7 compilation
2018	"You (Close)"	
2018	"Concussion"	
2018	"Treehouse"	
2018	"Want"	
2018	"Courante"	
2018	"Crater" (with Rhett)	Released on Rhett single Hollow Earth
2018	"A Higher Frequency" (with Tom Morello and Serj Tankian)	Released on 10 Years of Mom+Pop anniversary album
2019	"Minor Rain" (with HolyU)	Released on mau5trap's We are Friends, Vol. 8 compilation
2019	"Sinner Complicated"	First single from Lavender God
2020	"Hotel (featuring MAYLYN)"	Second single from Lavender God
2020	"The Night Air Was Cool"	
2020	"Faya"/"The Crack"	Double single
2021	"Feels Like (featuring Colleen D'agostino)"	Released on mau5trap's We are Friends, Vol. 10 compilation
2021	"86cc"	Piano Day 2021 celebratory single
2021	"Long Ride Home (featuring Oliver Wickham)"	
2021	"In the Arms of Lovers (featuring MAYLYN)"	
2022	"Waterbug"	First single from Carry it with You
2022	"Over the Water" (with Mango)	
2022	"Factory Gates"	Singles from Shapes in My Head; Released under the alias Sun Lo
2022	"Nothing Permanent"	Singles from Shapes in My Head; Released under the alias Sun Lo
2023	"Heights"	Singles from Shapes in My Head; Released under the alias Sun Lo
2023	"Never Learned"	Singles from Shapes in My Head; Released under the alias Sun Lo
2023	"Used to the Silence (featuring Jodie Knight)"	
2023	"A Game Of Fairies"	
2024	"The One" (with Mango and MAYLIN)	
2024	"Against The Current" (with OCULA)	
2026	"Angel Montreal" (with Mango)	Included "Angel Montreal - Extended Mix"
2026	"Elora"	Singles from SWAN
2026	"SWAN"	Singles from SWAN
2026	"Twin Snakes"	Singles from SWAN
2026	"Morning Prayer"	Singles from SWAN

=== Remixes ===
Year	Song title	Original Artist	Other notes	Ref.
2014	"Aural Psynapse"	deadmau5	Originally self-released, later re-released in 2015 as an official single via mau5trap	
2015	"Into The Night"	NERO		
2015	"Scream My Name"	Tove Lo		
2015	"America"	XYLØ		
2015	"Bitch Better Have My Money"	Rihanna		
2015	"Make a Baby"	Aphex Twin		
2015	"Weight in Gold"	Gallant		
2015	"Ramble On"	Led Zeppelin		
2016	"Needed Me"	Rihanna		
2016	"Strobe"	deadmau5	Released on the remix album Strobe (Remixes)	
2016	"You'll Remember Me"	Matt Lange	Released on the remix album Ephemera (Remixes)	
2016	"Trouble"	OFFAIAH		
2016	"You Don't Get Me High Anymore"	Phantogram		
2016	"Whatever (feat. KOLAJ)"	Kaskade		
2017	"Heartbreaker"	I Hate Models		
2017	"Elsium"	Eekkoo		
2017	"SIMMER DOWN"	ionnalee		
2018	"Streamline"	Pendulum	Released on the remix album The Reworks	
2018	"Better Not (feat. Wafia)"	Louis the Child		
2018	"Monophobia (feat. Rob Swire)"	deadmau5	Released on the deadmau5 compilation EP Mau5ville: Level 1	
2019	"Lost (feat. Chelsea Jade)"	Jai Wolf		
2019	"Ursa Minor"	Kidnap		
2019	"No Captain"	Lane 8		
2019	"Baby Baby"	Noizu		
2020	"Kingdom"	ARTY, Conrad Sewell		
2020	"Rush"	Hotel Garuda		
2020	"From Here"	CloudNone		
2021	"Be Someone (feat. EKE)"	Joachim Pastor		
2021	"Wasted on You"	DVRKO		
2022	"Closer"	Rolo Tomassi		
2022	"Keep Moving"	Riley Pierce		
2023	"Nothing Permanent"	Sun Lo		

== Awards and nominations ==
Year	Award	Category	Nominee(s)	Result	Ref.
2021	Juno Awards	Electronic Album of the Year	Lavender God	Nominated	
2022	Juno Awards	Electronic Album of the Year	Out Here with You	Nominated	
