= Le Couleur =

French-Canadian electro-pop band

- Origin: Montreal, Quebec, Canada
- Genres: Indie electronic Indie pop Electro-disco
- Years active: 2010–present
- Label: Lisbon Lux Records
- Members: Laurence Giroux-Do; Patrick Gosselin; Steeven Chouinard
- Website: https://soundcloud.com/lecouleur

Le Couleur is a French-Canadian electro-pop band from Montreal, Quebec, which currently consists of Laurence Giroux-Do, Patrick Gosselin, and Steeven Chouinard.

In 2010, the band released their debut album, Origami, which had widespread success in Europe, as well as back home in Quebec, propelling them to the top of Quebec’s independent radio charts. Following a meeting with French producer French Fox, Le Couleur approached him to produce their next EP. They also called upon members of French Horn Rebellion to participate in its creation, resulting in a sound that follows in Origami’s footsteps while still breaking new ground. Featuring their original French disco-pop sound, Voyage Love EP, released in 2013, brought Le Couleur to new levels of international recognition. The group was invited to play a number of renowned festivals, including but not limited to Pop Montreal, Liverpool Sound City, and M for Montreal. Voyage Love was also nominated for the GAMIQ (CA) prize in the category "Best EP of the year".

After their first tour of Europe in 2014, Le Couleur released a new track in November—"Concerto Rock"—the first single from their forthcoming Dolce Désir EP. Le Couleur released their Dolce Désir EP on February 17, 2015. In 2015, the group was nominated and won the GAMIQ (CA) prize in the category for "Electronic Music EP of the year" for their Dolce Désir EP.

== Discography ==
=== Studio albums ===
- 2010: Origami (Lisbon Lux Records)
- 2016: P.O.P. (Lisbon Lux Records)
- 2020: Concorde (Lisbon Lux Records)

=== Singles and EPs ===
- 2008: Petit Piano Électrique (Lisbon Lux Records)
- 2013: Voyage Love EP (Lisbon Lux Records)
- 2015: Dolce Désir EP (Lisbon Lux Records)
- 2019: Silhouette (single) (Lisbon Lux Records)
- 2020: Concorde (single); Silenzio (single); Désert (single) (Lisbon Lux Records)

=== Videos ===
Year	Video	Director
2013	"Femme"	

== Band members ==
- Laurence Giroux-Do (vocals, keyboard) (2010–present)
- Patrick Gosselin (bass, guitar, keyboard) (2010–present)
- Steeven Chouinard (drums) (2010–present)
