= The Halluci Nation =

Canadian electronic music group

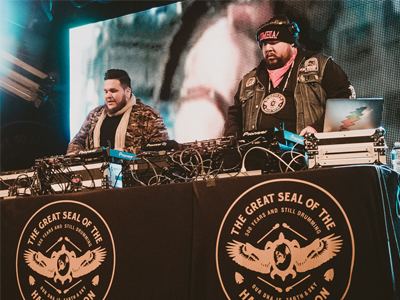
- The group in 2018, performing at the Commodore in Vancouver, British Columbia

Background information
- Also known as: A Tribe Called Red
- Origin: Ottawa, Ontario, Canada
- Genres: Dance, First Nations music, ethnotronica
- Years active: 2007–present
- Members: Tim "2oolman" Hill; Ehren "Bear Witness" Thomas
- Past members: Jon "Dee Jay Frame" Limoges; Ian "DJ NDN" Campeau; Dan "DJ Shub" General
- Website: thehallucination.com

The Halluci Nation is an Aboriginal Canadian disk jockey collective that blends instrumental hip hop, reggae, moombahton and dubstep-influenced dance music with elements of First Nations music, particularly vocal chanting and drumming. The group's music has been labelled as powwow-step, a style of contemporary powwow music for urban First Nations in the dance club scene; popularized by the media as a description of the band's unique style, the term originated as the title of one of the band's earliest songs.

The group consists of Tim "2oolman" Hill and Ehren "Bear Witness" Thomas. The group was founded in Ottawa, Ontario, in 2007 or 2008 as A Tribe Called Red (ATCR) by Bear Witness, Ian "DJ NDN" Campeau and Jon "Dee Jay Frame" Limoges. Dan "DJ Shub" General joined the group shortly after its formation and Frame departed as the group shifted from live performances to recording. Shub left the group in 2014 and was replaced by Hill, and Campeau left the group in 2017. The group changed its name to The Halluci Nation in April 2021.

The group has released four albums and has been recognized with national awards including Juno Awards for Breakthrough Group of the Year (2014) and Producer of the Year (2017).

== History ==
The group was founded by disc jockeys Bear Witness, Dee Jay Frame and DJ NDN (Thomas Ehren Ramon, Jon Limoges, and Ian Campeau, respectively). They had been inspired by dance club events for Korean and South Asian youth in Ottawa, and wanted to organize a similar event for Aboriginal youth. They held their first event, called Electric Pow Wow, at Ottawa's Babylon nightclub in 2007 or 2008, with following events held monthly until 2017. (Note: The Canadian Encyclopedia states that Electric Pow Wow events were held on the second weekend of each month while a 2021 announcement on the group's official Twitter stated that the parties were held on the first Saturday of the month.) The parties featured traditional powwow recordings, mixed with electronic music rhythms and genres such as dubstep, moombahton, and dancehall. Shortly after the first party, they invited Canadian DMC champion DJ Shub (Dan General) to participate. The four worked well together and DJ Shub moved from Niagara Falls to Ottawa to join the group.

The group released a number of tracks of their DJing via YouTube. Frame left the group as it shifted from live performances to recording, and as a trio A Tribe Called Red (ATCR) released their self-titled debut album as a free internet download in 2012. It was among 40 albums longlisted for the 2012 Polaris Music Prize.

In December 2012, ATCR released "The Road" on SoundCloud (p.27), where it garnered "upward of 50,000 plays within five months" and nearly 300,000 plays as of August 2018.

Their second album, Nation II Nation, was released in 2013 and was among 10 albums shortlisted for the 2013 Polaris Music Prize. The group also won several awards at the 2013 Aboriginal Peoples Choice Music Awards, including Best Group and Best Album for Nation II Nation.

Aided by the national media attention, (Note: They have been featured on CBC Radio's Q, Canada Live, and PBS' Sound Field, and have been playlisted on both CBC Radio 2 and CBC Radio 3 as well as BBC Radio 6 Music.) the group toured across much of Canada and parts of the United States, as well as performing festival dates in the US, United Kingdom, Germany, Greece, and Norway.

The group garnered two nominations at the Juno Awards of 2014, for Breakthrough Group of the Year and Electronic Album of the Year, winning the award for Breakthrough Group. They are the first indigenous group to have won a Juno outside of the Aboriginal music category, which they chose not to enter as they wished to compete against mainstream artists.

A Tribe Called Red have also collaborated on and produced one of the last known Das Racist songs, called "Indians From All Directions", as well as the song "A Tribe Called Red" on Angel Haze's album Dirty Gold.

General (DJ Shub) left the group in 2014 and was replaced by Tim "2oolman" Hill (Mohawk of the Six Nations of the Grand River).

In 2015, they released pro-wrestling-themed EP Suplex, with appearances from Smalltown DJs, as well as a remix of Buffy Sainte-Marie's song "Working for the Government". They won Best Music Video at the 2015 Native American Music Awards.

In September 2016, they released LP We Are the Halluci Nation, a concept album about banding together to fight oppression. Guest collaborators on the album include John Trudell, Narcy, Yasiin Bey, Lido Pimienta, Tanya Tagaq, Joseph Boyden, Black Bear, and Shad. The first voice heard on this album is Trudell's. The group wanted to celebrate contemporary Indigenous culture through this album.

The group won the Jack Richardson Producer of the Year Award at the Juno Awards of 2017. In October that year, "DJ NDN" left the group for health reasons.

The group won the Group of the Year award at the Juno Awards of 2018.

In April 2018, the band performed at a TED talk during TED2018 in Vancouver, British Columbia.

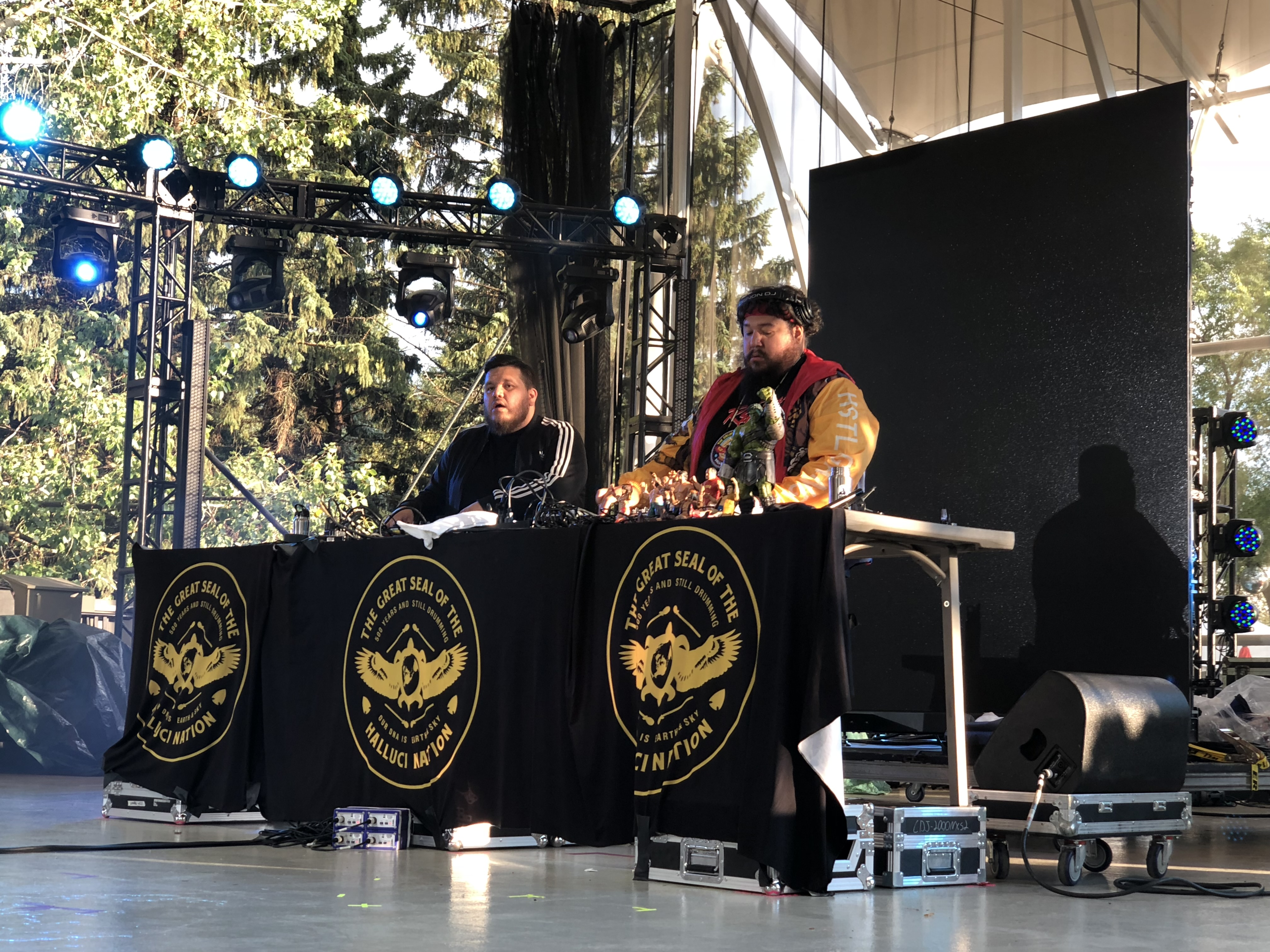
Edmonton, Interstellar Rodeo 2018

The group released a number of singles while touring in 2019, at which tours Notorious Cree danced. In April, the group released a remix of Keith Secola's song "NDN Kars". Exclaim!'s Sarah Murphy described it as a "modern twist" on the 1990s hit. The group later released "The OG", which was their first original song since the release of We Are the Halluci Nation. A few months later the group released Caribana festival-inspired "Ba Na Na", which features Canadian rapper Haviah Mighty, singer Odario, and Chippewa Travellers. In September 2019, the band released "Tanokumbia", a single featuring Texan DJ El Dusty and Canadian Pow Wow drummers and singers, Black Bear. In 2020, the group released "Land Back" featuring Boogey the Beat and Chippewa Travellers.

In April 2021, the group changed their name to The Halluci Nation, shortly ahead of the release of their fourth album. The band stated that the album, titled One More Saturday Night, references their regular Electric Pow Wow parties in Ottawa on the first Saturday of the month for nearly a decade.

In 2025, The Halluci Nation became the first independent Indigenous artists from North America to surpass 100 million streams on Spotify.

== Artistry ==
The group's music has been described as an innovative blend of genres which is difficult to characterize. It is often described as a new genre with self-referential names like electric powwow (after their Ottawa dance parties), or pow wow step (the title of their first song). The sound described under these terms is characterized by the mixture of First Nations pow wow and electronic music styles.

A broad sweep of contemporary dance music styles was brought to the group by its members. DJ Shub is a skilled turntablist with consecutive DJ champion titles (2007–2008) and an affection for hip-hop. Bear Witness favoured Jamaican dancehall and DJ NDN had worked in electronic dance music. Reggae, dubstep, house music, and moombahton have also been cited as influences. DJ NDN stated in a 2013 interview, "[a]ll we really did was match up dance music with dance music".

Their 2012 release "The Road" is structured around a series of "drops", an important component in electronic dance music derived from Jamaican sound systems as well as syncopated "trap beats" originating from dirty south hip-hop characterized with a booming bass drum and skittering hi-hats.

According to culture researcher Gabriel Levine, their second full-length record, Nation II Nation, has been perceived as one of the leaders of an artistic Indigenous resurgence, exemplifying the remixing of tradition, bridging Indigenous history and futurity.

Multimedia presentations which accompanied live shows from 2010 (and are the basis of some of the group's music videos), have been described as "a mashup of aboriginal stereotypes" including bizarre portrayals of indigenous people by white actors and in mainstream cartoons. These are assembled by Bear Witness, who has a collection of obscure DVD and VHS tapes.

== In other media ==
The band was featured prominently in the 2017 music documentary When They Awake, by filmmakers P. J. Marcellino and Hermon Farahi. The film was the opening night gala selection at the 2017 Calgary International Film Festival.

The Halluci Nation co-composed music for the sitcom Rutherford Falls, which premiered on Peacock in April 2021. The show centers on relationships between members of a fictional northeastern US town and a fictional Native American tribe. The songs "R.E.D." and "Stadium Pow Wow (feat. Black Bear)" were featured on the second season of Reservation Dogs.

The song "Electric Pow Wow Drum" was featured in three episodes of the 2016 television series Chance and in the trailer and soundtrack of the 2020 miniseries The Good Lord Bird. The song "Sisters" was featured in the third season of Kipo and the Age of Wonderbeasts.

The song "Sila" was featured in the trailer for the 2017 film Thoroughbreds and "Stadium Pow Wow (feat. Black Bear)" was featured in the second trailer for the 2023 film Killers of the Flower Moon.

== Activism ==
Bear Witness explained in a 2013 interview that the group had formed to throw parties for their community, and that in itself had political aspects: "To take over and Indigenize the club space is a really political act [...] As First Nations people everything we do is political". Bear Witness's mother had been an activist, and he drew upon that background when he created the multimedia shows for their parties, which "recontextualized stereotypical depictions of Indigenous peoples".

In a 2013 interview, DJ NDN explained: "I'm Ojibway, Anishinaabe. The other two guys, Dan [DJ Shub] and Bear, are both Cayuga [...] Historically, we're enemies. So together, in forming this group, that's a nation-to-nation relationship". He put forward that nation-to-nation conversations and relationships have to be held federally between "the settler nations and the First Nations".

The group have been vocal supporters of the Idle No More movement, a peaceful revolution launched in November 2012 to protest the Harper government's introduction of Bill C-45, the Jobs and Growth Act, which critics, including many First Nations people, claimed threatened both the environment and Aboriginal sovereignty. According to Levine, their song "The Road" provided a "catalyzing soundtrack to the Idle No More movement", advocating in favor of "Indigenous peoples reclaiming the land, moving to reverse the ongoing dispossessions of the settler state". The track recalls journeys such as the 1978 Longest Walk protest march from Alcatraz to Washington.

A Tribe Called Red gained media attention in 2013 when they issued a public statement asking non-aboriginal fans to refrain from cultural appropriation by not wearing headdresses and war paint to their shows. Afterwards, a number of music festivals enacted "no headdress" policies. Also that year, Campeau (DJ NDN) filed a human rights complaint against an Ottawa amateur football club that was using "Redskins" as its club name; the name was eventually changed to "Eagles".

In 2014, the band withdrew from a scheduled performance at the official opening ceremonies of the Canadian Museum for Human Rights, citing concerns about the museum's depiction of indigenous human rights issues. Also that year, they released "Burn Your Village to the Ground", a non-album protest song about the complicated aboriginal relationship with the colonialist connotations of Thanksgiving.

When the band toured on the international festival circuit after the release of Nation II Nation, they met with indigenous peoples from around the world and learned of their strikingly similar issues in the colonial experience.

The group is also activist through the expression of their music. "I think in our own community," Bear Witness told The National in 2013, "it's not something that people would have been ready for us to have been doing 10 or 15 years ago, to be sampling powwow music and bring it into clubs. I mean, that's really pushing boundaries." Using music as a platform to educate, they have broken away from homogenous genres and at once promoted appreciation and respect for First Nations cultures while combating stereotypes and appropriation.

"It's mind-blowing that this whole conversation that we've been having the past few decades about the portrayal of our people hasn't gone anywhere," said Bear Witness. "It hasn't changed." However, the band is positive about making a change moving forward. "All those things that we're trying to talk about with Idle No More, with aboriginal rights, you're feeling it and you're getting it without a word having to be said. Because when you feel that, you're feeling what we all feel."

In 2020, the band released "Land Back" as a free download. The song was intended to show support to the Wetʼsuwetʼen First Nations who were opposing the construction of the Coastal GasLink Pipeline and was hoped to be used in the associated protests.

In 2024, the group released "Voices Through Rubble", featuring Saul Williams and Narcy, in solidarity with the people of Palestine. Music writer Steven Ward described it as "spotlight[ing] the shared oppression and violence endured by Indigenous populations, inflicted by colonizers, that's ingrained in both our history and cultural mythology".

== Discography ==
=== Albums ===
Released as A Tribe Called Red:

- A Tribe Called Red (independent, 2012)
- Nation II Nation (Radicalized Records, 2013)
- We Are the Halluci Nation (Radicalized Records, 2016)

Released as The Halluci Nation:

- One More Saturday Night (Radicalized Records, 2021)

=== EPs ===
- Moombah Hip Moombah Hop (2011)
- Trapline (2013)
- Suplex (2015)
- Stadium Pow Wow (2016)
- Path of The Heel (2023)

=== Singles ===
- "Voices Through Rubble" (2024)
- "Babylon" (2025)

== Awards and nominations ==
Year	Award	Category	Nominee/Work	Result	Ref
2012	Polaris Music Prize		A Tribe Called Red	Longlisted	
2013	Polaris Music Prize		Nation II Nation	Shortlisted	
2013	Aboriginal Peoples' Choice Awards	Best Group/Duo	Nation II Nation	Won	
2013	Aboriginal Peoples' Choice Awards	Best Pop CD	Nation II Nation	Won	
2013	Aboriginal Peoples' Choice Awards	Best Producer/Engineer	Nation II Nation	Won	
2013	Aboriginal Peoples' Choice Awards	Best Album Cover Design	Nation II Nation	Won	
2014	Juno Awards	Breakthrough Group of the Year	A Tribe Called Red	Won	
2014	Juno Awards	Electronic Album of the Year	Nation II Nation	Nominated	
2015	Native American Music Awards	Best Music Video	"Sisters" (ft. Northern Voice)	Won	
2017	Canadian Independent Music Awards	Album of the Year	We Are The Halluci Nation	Won	
2017	Canadian Independent Music Awards	Group of the Year	A Tribe Called Red	Nominated	
2017	iHeartRadio Much Music Video Awards	Video of the Year	"R.E.D." (ft. Yasiin Bey, Narcy & Black Bear)	Won	
2017	iHeartRadio Much Music Video Awards	Fan Fave Video	"R.E.D." (ft. Yasiin Bey, Narcy & Black Bear)	Nominated	
2017	iHeartRadio Much Music Video Awards	Best EDM/Dance Video	"Stadium Pow Wow" (ft. Black Bear)	Nominated	
2017	Juno Awards	Video of the Year	"R.E.D." (ft. Yasiin Bey, Narcy & Black Bear)	Nominated	
2017	Juno Awards	Electronic Album of the Year	We Are the Halluci Nation	Nominated	
2017	Juno Awards	Jack Richardson Producer of the Year Award	"R.E.D." and "Sila" from We Are the Halluci Nation	Won	
2018	Juno Awards	Group of the Year	A Tribe Called Red	Won	
