= Honey (Caribou album) =

Studio album by Caribou
- Released: October 4, 2024
- Length: 40:30
- Labels: City Slang; Merge
- Producer: Dan Snaith

Caribou chronology
Suddenly (2020)	Honey (2024)

Singles from Honey
- 1. "Honey" Released: April 8, 2024; 2. "Broke My Heart" Released: June 3, 2024; 3. "Volume" Released: July 31, 2024; 4. "Come Find Me" Released: August 28, 2024

Honey is the eleventh studio album by the Canadian musician Dan Snaith, released under the moniker Caribou on October 4, 2024, through Merge Records and City Slang. It is Snaith's sixth album as Caribou.

== Background and singles ==
Following the release of Suddenly in 2020, Snaith released the single "You Can Do It" in 2021 and returned to releasing dance under the name Daphni the year after. After two years of absence, Snaith released the lead single, "Honey", on April 8, 2024, which he had teased in 2023. It was followed by the songs "Broke My Heart" on June 2 and "Volume", which samples the 1987 song "Pump Up the Volume" by MARRS, on July 31.

Snaith announced Honey on August 28, alongside the release of the fourth single, "Come Find Me". Snaith said he aimed to create "huge dancefloor tracks" that were accessible to everyone. Snaith used AI to modify his voice on several tracks.

== Critical reception ==
Professional ratings
Aggregate scores
Source	Rating
AnyDecentMusic?	7.2/10
Metacritic	73/100
Review scores
Source	Rating
Pitchfork	7.8/10

Honey was longlisted for the 2025 Polaris Music Prize.

=== Year-end lists ===
Select year-end rankings for Honey
Publication/critic	Accolade	Rank	Ref.
Exclaim!	50 Best Albums of 2024	5	
Rough Trade UK	Albums of the Year 2024	40	

== Track listing ==
All tracks are written by Dan Snaith, except where noted.

Honey track listing
No.	Title	Length
1.	"Broke My Heart"	2:46
2.	"Honey"	4:22
3.	"Volume" (Snaith, Steven Young, Andrew Biggs)	3:58
4.	"Do Without You"	2:16
5.	"Come Find Me"	3:56
6.	"August 20/24"	1:32
7.	"Dear Life"	3:44
8.	"Over Now"	4:27
9.	"Campfire"	2:32
10.	"Climbing" (Snaith, Angela Lisa Winbush, Ivan René Moore)	4:10
11.	"Only You"	3:36
12.	"Got to Change"	3:11
Total length:		40:30

Sample credits

- "Volume" contains a sample of "Pump Up the Volume" written by Martyn Young and Steven Young and performed by MARRS.
- "Climbing" contains a sample of "Just Friends" written by Angela Lisa Winbush and Ivan René Moore and performed by René & Angela.

== Personnel ==
- Dan Snaith – production, recording, arrangement on "Broke My Heart" and "Honey"
- Matt Colton – mastering
- David Wrench – mixing
- Amy Ratcliffe – mixing assistance
- Grace Banks – mixing assistance
- Jason Evans – art direction, photography
- Matthew Cooper – design
- Kieran Hebden – arrangement on "Broke My Heart" and "Honey"

== Charts ==
Chart performance for Honey
Chart (2024)	Peak position
Belgian Albums (Ultratop Flanders)	146
Scottish Albums (Official Charts)	13
UK Albums (Official Charts)	67
UK Dance Albums (Official Charts)	2
UK Independent Albums (Official Charts)	8
