= Dan Snaith =

Canadian musician (born 1978)

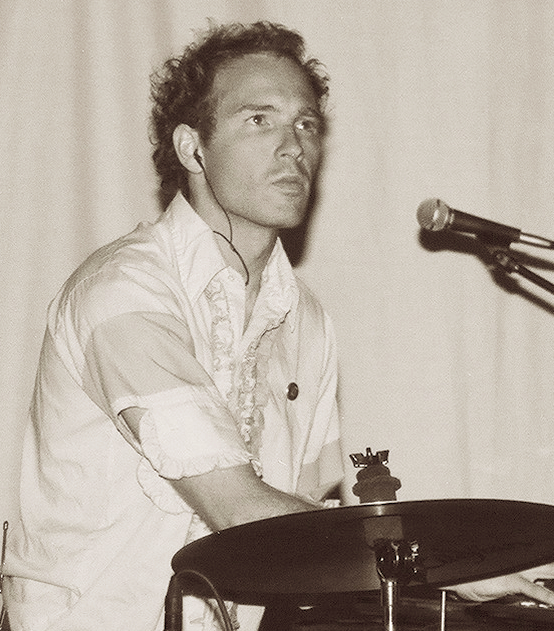
- Snaith in 2005

Background information
- Also known as: Manitoba; Caribou; Daphni
- Born: Daniel Victor Snaith; 29 March 1978 (age 48)
- Origin: Dundas, Ontario, Canada
- Genres: Indietronica; house; folktronica; neo-psychedelia; dream pop
- Occupations: Musician; music producer
- Instruments: Synthesizer; drums; guitar; bass
- Labels: City Slang; Merge; Leaf; Domino
- Website: caribou.fm

Daniel Victor Snaith (born 29 March 1978) is a Canadian musician. He has released 11 studio albums since 2000 and has recorded and performed under the stage names Caribou, Manitoba and Daphni.

The Caribou album Andorra (2007) was awarded the 2008 Polaris Music Prize, and the Caribou album Swim (2010) was a shortlisted nominee for the 2010 Polaris Music Prize and was named the Best Album of 2010 by Resident Advisor. Our Love (2014) was also shortlisted for the 2015 Polaris Music Prize and was nominated for the Grammy Award for Best Dance/Electronic Album.

During live Caribou performances, Snaith is joined by his longtime bandmates, Ryan Smith (guitar, keyboards), John Schmersal (bass, keyboards) and Brad Weber (drums). Regarding their performances as a four-piece, Snaith stated: "The whole idea is it's not just me, and it's not just hired guns. The live show is its own thing and they're a proper band – in the sense that we're all equally part of it."

== Career ==
Snaith originally recorded under the stage name Manitoba; however, after being threatened with a lawsuit by Richard "Handsome Dick" Manitoba in 2004, Snaith changed his performance name to Caribou. Snaith's previous full-length albums were then re-released under the new moniker.

When playing gigs as Caribou, Snaith performs with a live band. Currently, the live band consists of Snaith, Ryan Smith, Brad Weber, and John Schmersal. Caribou have toured worldwide since the early 2000s. The band has performed at festivals including Coachella, Glastonbury, Primavera Sound, Field Day, Bonnaroo, All Points East, Reading and Leeds, Parklife, Osheaga, amongst others. In 2012, Caribou supported Radiohead on their King of Limbs tour. When performing as Daphni, Snaith performs as a DJ. "I'm not the type of person who takes physical things apart and plays around with them, but I like taking mental ideas apart and playing around with them. That's what appeals to me about what I've spent my life doing", said Snaith in an interview.

Caribou's 2007 album Andorra won the 2008 Polaris Music Prize, and his subsequent Caribou albums Swim (2010), Our Love (2014) and Suddenly (2020) have appeared on the Polaris Music Prize shortlist. In 2011, looking for an outlet for more dancefloor influenced output, he began releasing music under the name Daphni, which included three studio albums: Jiaolong (2012), Joli Mai (2017) and Cherry (2022). In December 2011, Caribou curated the All Tomorrow's Parties "Nightmare Before Christmas" festival in Minehead, England, alongside co-curators Battles and Les Savy Fav.

Caribou was awarded Essential Mix of the Year in 2014 by Mixmag for his "Essential Mix" on 18 October 2014. Caribou's 2014 album Our Love received the IMPALA Album of the Year Award. In 2015, Caribou's album Our Love was nominated for a Grammy for 'Best Electronic/Dance Album' and in 2021 Caribou's single 'You Can Do it' was nominated for the Grammy for 'Best Dance Recording'. In 2011, 2015 and 2021, Caribou's albums Swim, Our Love and Suddenly won the Juno Award for Electronic Album of the Year. In 2021, he also received the Libera Awards as Best Dance/Electric Record 2021 for his album Suddenly (Merge Records) by the American Association of Independent Music (A2IM). In 2024, he released his 8th studio album as Caribou, Honey, which was also longlisted for the 2025 Polaris Music Prize. Butterfly, his latest Daphni release, was longlisted for the 2026 Polaris Music Prize. A expanded edition of Butterfly is set to release in September 2026 and includes seven new tracks and remixes.

== Caribou live band ==
Current members

- Ryan Smith – guitar, keyboards, percussion (2003–present)
- Brad Weber – drums (2007–present)
- John Schmersal – bass guitar, keyboards, backing vocals (2009–present)

Former members

- Peter Mitton – drums, guitar, keyboards, glockenspiel (2003–2007)
- Andy Lloyd – bass guitar (2007–2009)

== Personal life ==
In 2005, Snaith received a PhD degree in mathematics from Imperial College London, for work on Overconvergent Siegel Modular Symbols under Kevin Buzzard. Snaith described his work as "original, but I would still call it trivial". He is the son of mathematician Victor Snaith and brother of mathematician Nina Snaith. Snaith has two daughters, with the youngest born in 2016.

== Discography ==
=== Studio albums ===
==== as Manitoba ====
- Start Breaking My Heart (2001)
- Up in Flames (2003)

==== as Caribou ====
- The Milk of Human Kindness (2005)
- Andorra (2007)
- Swim (2010)
- Our Love (2014)
- Suddenly (2020)
- Honey (2024)

==== as Daphni ====
- Jiaolong (2012)
- Joli Mai (2017)
- Cherry (2022)
- Butterfly (2026)

=== EPs ===
==== as Manitoba ====
- People Eating Fruit EP (30 October 2000)
- give'r EP (26 November 2001)
- If Assholes Could Fly This Place Would Be an Airport 12" (13 January 2003)

Most of Snaith's older Manitoba material has been rereleased under the Caribou name.

==== as Caribou ====
- Tour CD 2005 (2005) Super Furry Animals Tour
- Marino EP (2005)
- Tour CD 2007 (2007)
- Tour CD 2010 (2010)
- Caribou Vibration Ensemble (2010, ATP) Live album featuring Marshall Allen. Caribou 'side project'.
- CVE Live 2011 EP (2014) Caribou Vibration Ensemble. Caribou 'side project'.

==== as Daphni ====
- Resident Advisor, February 2011 (5 tracks of episode 246)
- Daphni Edits Vol. 1, 12" [Resista], March 2011
- Pinnacles / Ye Ye, 12" split with Four Tet [Text], March 2011
- Daphni Edits Vol. 2, 12" [Resista], August 2011
- JIAOLONG001, 12" [Jiaolong], October 2011
- Ahora, 12" [Amazing Sounds], November 2011
- Julia / Tiberius, 12" featuring Owen Pallett [Jiaolong], April 2014
- Sizzling EP, June, 2019

=== Singles ===
==== as Manitoba ====
- "Paul's Birthday" CDS (26 February 2001)
- "Jacknuggeted" CDS (24 February 2003)
- "Hendrix with Ko" CDS (14 July 2003)

==== as Caribou ====
- "Yeti" CDS/12" (22 March 2005)
- "Barnowl" (2005)
- "Melody Day" CDS (August 2007)
- "She's the One" (March 2008)
- "Eli" (2008)
- "Odessa" (24 April 2010)
- "Leave House" (2010)
- "Bowls" (19 July 2010)
- "Can't Do Without You" (15 July 2014)
- "Our Love" (September 2014)
- "Your Love Will Set You Free" (2014)
- "All I Ever Need" (2014)
- "Mars" (2015)
- "Home" (2019)
- "You and I" (2020)
- "Never Come Back" (2020)
- "You Can Do It" (2021)
- "Honey" (2024)

==== as Daphni ====
- "Sizzling" (2019)
- "Cherry" (2022)
- "Cloudy" (2022)
- "Clavicle" (2022)
- "Mania" (2022)

=== Music videos ===
as Caribou

- Marino: The Videos DVD (2005) 16 videos for 'Up In Flames' (8), and 'Milk Of Human Kindness' (8), and 'The Milk Of Human Kindness (Story Edit)' featurette.
- Can't Do Without You - 2014
- Sun - 2010
- Odessa - 2010
- You Can Do It - 2021

== Awards and recognition ==
- 2010 Polaris Music Prize – short list (Swim)
- 2011 Juno Awards – winner, Electronic Album of the Year (Swim)
- 2015 IMPALA Album of the Year Award (Our Love)
- 2015 Polaris Music Prize – short list (Our Love)

== See also ==
- Canadian rock
- List of Canadian musicians
