= Azari & III =

Canadian music group

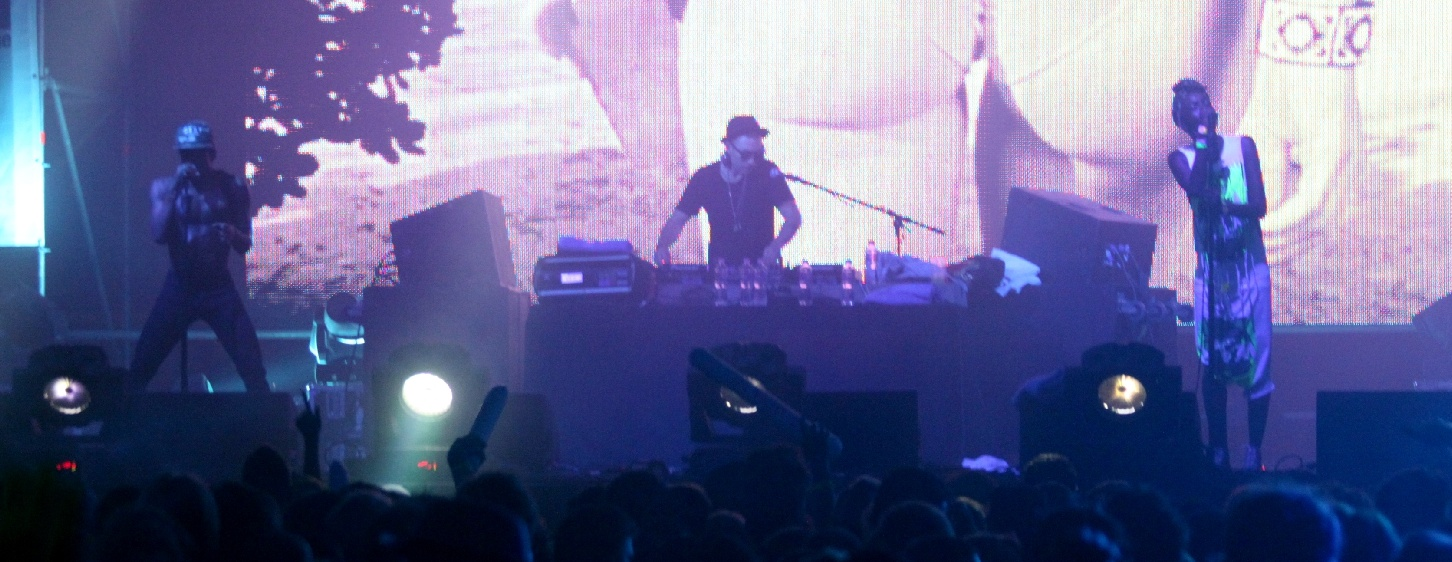
- Azari & III performing at the Sziget Festival in August 2012

Background information
- Origin: Toronto, Ontario, Canada
- Genres: Chicago house; nu-disco; deep house; garage house; dance; industrial
- Years active: 2008–2014
- Labels: Dim Mak Records; Turbo Recordings; Loose Lips Records; Get Physical Music; Idol Hanse; Island; I'm A Cliché; Permanent Vacation; Scion Audio/Visual; Trax Records
- Members: Dinamo Azari; Alixander III; Starving Yet Full; Fritz Helder

Azari & III (pronounced "Azari and Third") was a Canadian music group, formed in 2008, which performed house, electronic and dance music. They released their self-titled debut album in 2011 and earned recognition on the dance music scene with the hits "Hungry for the Power" and "Reckless (With Your Love)".

== History ==
Dinamo Azari, Fritz Helder, Alixander III (Alphonse Lanza) and Starving Yet Full (Cedric Gasaida) met at a karaoke bar "while dancing to Donna Summer". They formed Azari & III in 2007 and, in 2009, released their first single, "Hungry for the Power". The "Hungry for the Power" video was considered too controversial by YouTube, which removed it from its website for several weeks. That single was followed by "Reckless (With Your Love)", which drew the attention of Canadian DJ, producer and musician Tiga. In 2010, Azari & III collaborated with Friendly Fires on a track "Stay Here" and released solo singles "Indigo" and "Into the Night".

In August 2011, the band released a new single, "Manic", alongside their debut album Azari & III, which charted at number 13 on the UK Dance Albums Chart. "Hungry for the Power" and "Reckless (With Your Love)" were re-released, and the band appeared at a number of festivals, including Glastonbury and Lovebox in the United Kingdom, and Sónar in Spain.

The singles "Hungry for the Power", "Manic" and "Reckless (With Your Love)" placed at positions 2, 7 and 121 respectively in the 2011 year-end list of the German Club Charts. Azari & III also contributed remixes for artists like Robyn and Cut Copy. In February 2012, their debut album was re-released in Europe and the band continued to perform for the rest of the year, including appearances at festivals Southside and Hurricane in Germany, Hove in Norway, Exit in Serbia and Sziget in Hungary. Azari & III also performed again at the Lovebox Festival in London, headlining the Dalston Superstore Live stage. The single "Into the Night" was re-released, along with a new video; that was followed by the release of a new single, "Lost in Time". "Reckless (With Your Love)" placed at number 3 in the 2012 year-end list of the German Club Charts. Azari & III was nominated for a Polaris Music Prize in 2012.

In 2013, the band released Remix Album 2013 and the single "Indigo Remixes". Also in 2013, they released another remix album, Body Language Vol. 13, which is remixes of other artists' songs.

In November 2013, Alixander III posted on his Facebook page that the band was splitting, saying that the project had run its course.

In 2015, the Toronto label Idol Hanse gathered unreleased and loose songs and released a new album by Azari & III, Rarities From Extremities. It was long-listed for the 2016 Polaris Music Prize.

== Band members ==
- Dinamo Azari (Christian Philip Maxwell Farley) – producer, musician
- Alixander III (Alphonse Lanza III) – producer, musician
- Starving Yet Full (Cédric Gasaida) – vocalist
- Fritz Helder (Fritz Helder) – vocalist

== Discography ==
=== Studio albums ===
- 2011: Azari & III, Loose Lips Records
- 2015: Rarities From Extremities, Idol Hanse

=== Remix and DJ mix albums ===
- 2012: FACT Mix 313, Fact Magazine
- 2013: Remix Album 2013, Turbo Recordings, Dim Mak Records
- 2013: Body Language Vol. 13, Get Physical Music

=== EPs & Singles ===
- 2009: "Hungry for the Power", I'm A Cliché (re-released in 2011)
- 2009: "Reckless (With Your Love)", Permanent Vacation (re-released in 2011)
- 2010: "Indigo", Turbo Recordings (re-released in 2013)
- 2010: "Into the Night", Scion Audio/Visual (re-released in 2012, Loose Lips Records, Cooperative Music)
- 2011: "Manic", Turbo Recordings
- 2012: "Lost in Time", Loose Lips Records
- 2013: "The Lost Versions", Turbo Recordings
- 2013: "Indigo Remixes", Dim Mak Records
- 2013: "Lost Express", Get Physical Music
- 2015: "No Way Back" (with MixHell), Trax Records
