= Out Here with You =

Out Here With You

Studio album by Attlas
- Released: November 6, 2020
- Genre: Electronic
- Length: 55:16
- Label: mau5trap

Attlas chronology
Lavender God (2020)	Out Here With You (2020)	Carry it with You (2022)

Out Here With You is the Juno-nominated second studio album by Canadian producer Jeff Hartford, otherwise known as ATTLAS. It was released November 6, 2020 under mau5trap records.

== Background ==
Many songs on the album were composed during Canada's 2020 lockdown due to the COVID-19 pandemic as well as other difficult times for Harford, such as after an injury in 2019. However, he described the songs as small moments of positivity in a tumultuous time and "a chance to catch my breath". Examples of positive moments that inspired the tracks include early morning drives, watching storm clouds, running from sudden rain showers, and jogging along the Martin Goodman Trail. Unique visualizers for each of the songs were provided by the artist Cyclo, and small sound clips of spoken word from public domain films were included on some tracks.

A continuous mix version of the album was released on YouTube in December 2020 with additional visuals provided again by Cyclo as well as new voice samples from various sources. The quotes were deliberately selected to convey feelings of vulnerability and surrender, and the mix is very similar to installments of Hartford's 'Storyline' series.

== Critical reception ==
Out Here With You was largely praised for maintaining a calm positivity and hope "in times needed the most". Reviews for the album called it "cinematic to its core", "a sweetly serene... melodic whirlwind", a "warm, transient feeling of utter bliss in sound", and an "immersive experience". The album made it onto several end-of-the-year lists, with EDMTunes.com ranking Out Here With You as the 7th best album of 2020, Reddit community r/electronicmusic voting it as the 9th best electronic album of 2020, and Dancing Astronaut naming it the 18th best electronic album of the year. The album was also nominated for the 2022 Juno Award for Electronic Album of the Year.

== Track listing ==
All tracks are written by Jeffrey Hartford.

No.	Title	Length
1.	"Morning Fields"	2:45
2.	"Polar Concept"	6:31
3.	"Uour"	6:05
4.	"Seabreeze"	5:31
5.	"Thunderstorms from the Balcony"	2:09
6.	"When We Were the Same"	7:46
7.	"In a Cloud"	4:16
8.	"Ponds"	4:13
9.	"Mgt"	5:53
10.	"Out There with You"	10:07
Total length:		55:16
