= Swim (Caribou album) =

Studio album by Caribou
- Released: April 20, 2010
- Studios: Bryn Derwen Studio (Wales); Pistachio Studio (Hamilton, Ontario)
- Genres: Electronic; deep house; dance; neo-psychedelia
- Length: 43:17
- Labels: City Slang; Merge
- Producer: Dan Snaith

Caribou chronology
Andorra (2007)	Swim (2010)	Jiaolong (2012)

Singles from Swim
- 1. "Odessa" Released: January 25, 2010; 2. "Leave House" Released: 2010; 3. "Bowls" Released: July 19, 2010

Swim is the fifth studio album by Canadian musician Dan Snaith, released under the moniker Caribou on April 20, 2010, by City Slang and Merge. It is his third album credited under Caribou and deviated from the psychedelic pop of his recent work and toward dance music. The album straddles between more cerebral electronic music and more danceable electronic music.

Swim continued the critical success set by Snaith and was critically acclaimed upon its release, later making several publications' year-end best album lists. It was recognized as one of "The 100 Best Albums of the Decade So Far" by Pitchfork in August 2014.

Swim Remixes, a compilation of remixes from the album, was released in 2010 by Merge Records and features remixes by artists such as Junior Boys, Fuck Buttons, and Nite Jewel.

== Background ==
Swim was, according to Snaith, "pretty much me getting up every day and wanting to work on music. Working constantly on it. Making loads and loads and loads of music and then just sifting through to find the bits that I like". Playing more DJ gigs, such as those at London's Plastic People, influenced the musician to embrace dance music and a greater range of frequencies in his music, which led to the formulation of Swim. Nevertheless, about 700 songs, some unfinished, did not make it onto the album.

"Jamelia" features vocals by Luke Lalonde of Born Ruffians.

== Reception ==
Professional ratings
Aggregate scores
Source	Rating
AnyDecentMusic?	8.1/10
Metacritic	83/100
Review scores
Source	Rating
AllMusic	4/5 stars
The A.V. Club	A−
The Daily Telegraph	4/5 stars
The Guardian	4/5 stars
Mojo	4/5 stars
NME	8/10
Pitchfork	8.4/10
Q	4/5 stars
Spin	8/10
Uncut	4/5 stars

Swim received acclaim from critics, being assigned a Metascore of 83 by Metacritic. It was a shortlisted nominee for the 2010 Polaris Music Prize, and was named the Best Album of 2010 by Resident Advisor. The album also won the Juno Award in 2010 for Best Electronic Album of the Year and was awarded the second spot in Exclaim!'s 2010 Electronic Year in Review. Daniel Sylvester of Exclaim! praised the organic nature of the album, claiming "Caribou will be remembered for Swim."

As of 2011, it has sold 33,803 copies in US. As of 2015 it has sold 175,000 copies worldwide according to Independent Music Companies Association.

Publications ranking Swim on their end-of-year lists included:

- 1st Resident Advisor
- 1st Urban75
- 1st Mixmag
- 4th musicOMH
- 6th The Guardian
- 17th Pitchfork
- 19th Drowned In Sound
- 39th Spin
- 58th NME

The first track on the album, "Odessa," was featured in Ubisoft's press conference at E3 2012, in a commercial for the automobile manufacturer Acura, in EA Sports' football video game FIFA 11, as well as in a 2011 commercial for the Lexus CT 200h and a 2012 commercial for Tissot watches.

== Track listing ==
All tracks are written by Dan Snaith.

No.	Title	Length
1.	"Odessa"	5:15
2.	"Sun"	5:44
3.	"Kaili"	4:41
4.	"Found Out"	3:18
5.	"Bowls"	6:20
6.	"Leave House"	5:11
7.	"Hannibal"	6:14
8.	"Lalibela"	2:25
9.	"Jamelia"	3:58
Total length:		43:17

== Charts ==
Chart (2010)	Peak position
Belgian Albums (Ultratop Flanders)	94
French Albums (SNEP)	177
UK Albums (Official Charts)	54
US Billboard 200	97
US Independent Albums (Billboard)	14
US Top Alternative Albums (Billboard)	18
US Top Rock Albums (Billboard)	31
