= Jiaolong (album) =

Studio album by Daphni
- Released: October 16, 2012
- Length: 47:52
- Label: Merge
- Producer: Dan Snaith

Daphni chronology
Swim (2010)	Jiaolong (2012)	Our Love (2014)

Jiaolong is the sixth studio album by Canadian musician Daniel Snaith, released on October 16, 2012 by Merge. It is the first album in Snaith's discography credited under the moniker Daphni, and is more dancefloor oriented than his work as Caribou.

The album was named a longlisted nominee for the 2013 Polaris Music Prize on June 13, 2013. It received positive reviews, although less than Snaith's previous release, Swim.

Professional ratings
Aggregate scores
Source	Rating
AnyDecentMusic?	7.2/10
Metacritic	76/100
Review scores
Source	Rating
AllMusic	3.5/5 stars
Drowned in Sound	7/10
Los Angeles Times	3.5/5 stars
NME	8/10
Now	4/5
The Observer	3/5 stars
Pitchfork	7.5/10
Resident Advisor	4/5
Spin	8/10
XLR8R	8.5/10

== Track listing ==
No.	Title	Length
1.	"Yes, I Know"	4:26
2.	"Ne Noya (Daphni Mix)" (performed by Cos-Ber-Zam)	5:36
3.	"Ye Ye"	6:05
4.	"Light"	5:20
5.	"Pairs"	5:40
6.	"Ahora"	5:46
7.	"Jiao"	4:36
8.	"Springs"	4:21
9.	"Long"	6:02
Total length:		47:52
