= We Are the Halluci Nation =

Studio album by the Halluci Nation
- Released: September 16, 2016
- Genres: Electronic, hip-hop
- Length: 50:08
- Label: Radicalized Records

The Halluci Nation chronology
Suplex (EP) (2015)	We Are the Halluci Nation (2016)	Stadium Pow Wow (EP) (2016)

We Are the Halluci Nation is the third studio album by Canadian electronic music group the Halluci Nation, released on September 16, 2016 by Radicalized Records, an imprint of Pirates Blend Records.

== Background ==
We Are the Halluci Nation is a concept album built around the "Halluci Nation", inspired by late Native American rights activist, musician and poet John Trudell. The Halluci Nation aims to "[promote] inclusivity, empathy and acceptance amongst all races and genders in the name of social justice. They believe that Indigenous people need to define their identity on their own terms." Trudell was in the process of collaborating with the group prior to his death, and is featured on two tracks.

A Tribe Called Red was inspired to create a concept album featuring the stories of Aboriginal voices, addressing the impact of colonization on indigenous people in the modern world. Among these voices was the story of Chanie Wenjack, an Ojibwe (Anishinaabe) First Nations boy who attempted to escape his residential school and died of hunger and exposure. This was inspired originally by Gord Downie, the lead singer of The Tragically Hip, who brought public attention to Wenjack's story in 2016 with his solo album Secret Path. Ian Campeau spoke about the band's involvement in the Wenjack project in an interview for Q, noting Joseph Boyden's involvement with Wenjack.

== Critical reception ==
The album received acclaim upon reception. We Are the Halluci Nation was nominated for CBC Music's Best Canadian Album of the Year. Pitchfork assigned the album a rating of 8.1 out of 10, calling it "politically thrilling and immediate." Exclaim!'s David Dacks praised the "dancehall-indebted polyrhythms and creative beatmaking", and Now described it as "powerful protest music set to pounding beats."

A Tribe Called Red was recognized with the Jack Richardson Producer of the Year Award at the Juno Awards of 2017 for their work on We Are the Halluci Nation.

The album was a shortlisted nominee for the 2017 Polaris Music Prize.

== Track listing ==
All tracks are written by A Tribe Called Red.

No.	Title	Length
1.	"We Are the Halluci Nation" (featuring John Trudell & Northern Voice)	2:44
2.	"R.E.D." (featuring Yasiin Bey, Narcy & Black Bear)	3:29
3.	"The Virus" (featuring Saul Williams & Chippewa Travellers)	3:50
4.	"Before" (featuring Joseph Boyden)	1:50
5.	"Sila" (featuring Tanya Tagaq)	3:08
6.	"The Light" (featuring Lido Pimienta)	4:11
7.	"Maima Koopi" (featuring Oka & Chippewa Travellers)	4:14
8.	"JHD" (featuring Junior Ottawa)	3:38
9.	"Eanan" (featuring Maxida Märak)	2:41
10.	"The Muse" (featuring Jennifer Kreisberg)	4:37
11.	"Indian City" (featuring Black Bear)	3:37
12.	"How I Feel" (featuring Leonard Sumner, Shad & Northern Voice)	4:21
13.	"For You (The Light, Pt. 2)" (featuring Lido Pimienta)	3:43
14.	"Alie Nation" (featuring John Trudell, Lido Pimienta & Tanya Tagaq)	2:03
15.	"Soon" (featuring Joseph Boyden)	2:02

== Charts ==
Chart	Peak position
US Top Dance/Electronic Albums (Billboard)	7
US Heatseekers Albums (Billboard)	17
