= Within (Protest the Hero album) =

Studio album by Protest the Hero
- Released: July 17, 2026
- Genres: Progressive metal; progressive metalcore
- Length: 35:56
- Label: Self-released

Protest the Hero chronology
Palimpsest (2020)	Within (2026)

Singles from Within
- 1. "Mouthpiece" Released: June 4, 2026

Professional ratings
Review scores
Source	Rating
Boolin Tunes	8.5/10
Distorted Sound	9/10
Kerrang!	4/5
New Noise Magazine	4.5/5
Sonic Perspectives	8.5/10

Within is the sixth studio album by Canadian progressive metal band, Protest the Hero released July 17, 2026. The album marks as the group's first truly independent release, in contrast to their fourth studio album, 2013's Volition which was independently financed through crowdfunding by fans via IndieGogo.

Following six years since their previous album, Palimpsest in 2020, Within is also notable as Protest The Hero's shortest full-length, to date (despite being less than a minute longer than their 2016 subscription-based EP, Pacific Myth).

Within was preceded by the album's only single, "Mouthpiece" on June 4, 2026. Upon its release, The album was met with critical acclaim from critics and fans alike.

== Background ==
Vocalist Rody Walker explained, "There is definitely a theme on the album about a return to nature. It's referenced in almost every song. Truthfully, water and ocean metaphors are just so fucking easy. Pacific Myth is all about how easy and kind of cheap it is. And it's so easy and cheap that I accidentally continue to do it over and over again."

== Track listing ==
No.	Title	Writer(s)	Length
1.	"Mouthpiece"	Rody Walker; Luke Hoskin; Milen Petzelt-Sorace	05:05
2.	"Fishhook"	Walker; Hoskin; Petzelt-Sorace	05:14
3.	"i. above"	Walker; Hoskin; Petzelt-Sorace; William Lamoureux	01:30
4.	"Grandfather's Axe"	Walker; Hoskin; Petzelt-Sorace	05:09
5.	"The Orchard" (featuring Jadea Kelly and Chris Cresswell)	Walker; Hoskin; Petzelt-Sorace; Tim MacMillar; Mike Ieradi	04:40
6.	"ii. below"	Walker; Hoskin; Petzelt-Sorace; Lamoureux	01:02
7.	"Liberty Spike"	Walker; Hoskin; Petzelt-Sorace	05:42
8.	"The Mariner"	Walker; Hoskin; Petzelt-Sorace; MacMillar	07:29
Total length:			35:56

== Personnel ==
Protest The Hero

- Rody Walker – lead vocals, writing, lyrics
- Luke Hoskin — lead guitar, backing vocals, writing
- Tim MacMillar – rhythm guitar, backing vocals, writing (tracks 5, 8)

Additional session musicians

- Cameron McLellan – bass, production, engineering, editing
- Milen Petzelt-Sorace – vocal production, editing, arrangement, backing vocals (tracks 1, 2, 5, 8), writing
- Nathan Bulla – drums, percussion (tracks 1-2, 4-8)
- Jadea Kelly – additional vocals (track 5)
- Chris Cresswell – additional vocals (track 5)
- William Lamoureux – violin, cello, producer (tracks 3, 6), writing (track 3)
- Mike Ieradi – additional writing (track 5)
- Dylan Ryche – acoustic guitar (tracks 2, 4, 8)
- Jill Sauerteig – additional cello (tracks 3, 8)
- Nat Andres — backing vocals (tracks 1, 2, 5)
- Jordan Bernard — backing vocals (track 5)
- Kaitlin Bernard — backing vocals (track 5)
- Rylie Ewing — backing vocals (tracks 1, 2, 5)
- Sandy MacMillar — backing vocals (track 5)
- Megan Marsh — backing vocals (track 5)
- Tyler Parish — backing vocals (tracks 1, 2, 5, 8)

Technical

- Derya Nagle – guitar production
- Adam "Nolly" Getgood – mixing
- João Carvalho – mastering
- Sebastian Sendon – mixing assistant
- Darren "Jeter" Magierowski – additional drum engineering
- Jill Zimmermann – additional drum engineering
- Martin A. Wittfooth – album artwork

== Charts ==
Chart performance for Within
Chart (2026)	Peak position
UK Album Downloads (Official Charts)	24
UK Independent Albums Breakers (Official Charts)	20
