= Palimpsest (album) =

Studio album by Protest the Hero
- Released: June 18, 2020
- Recorded: 2019
- Genre: Progressive metal
- Length: 53:29
- Label: Spinefarm Records
- Producers: Derya Nagle; Milen Petzelt-Sorace

Protest the Hero chronology
| Pacific Myth (2016) | Palimpsest (2020) | Within (2026) |

Singles from Palimpsest
- 1. "The Canary" Released: 16 April 2020; 2. "From the Sky" Released: 14 May 2020

Palimpsest is the fifth studio album by Canadian progressive metal band Protest the Hero released on June 18, 2020 through Spinefarm Records. Palimpsest marks the band's first studio record since 2013's Volition, and their first new material since 2016's Pacific Myth EP.

This is the first studio album (and second overall release) of the band to feature session member Cam McLellan on bass, and the only album to feature Mike Ieradi on drums before his departure in 2022.

== Background ==
Talking about the recording process of Palimpsest, Guitarist Luke Hoskin explained, "'Palimpsest' is by far the most challenging record we have worked on. The writing and recording process saw so many delays, it's honestly hard to keep them straight. We are very proud of how each hurdle was handled though, and the end result is a record that we believe is deserving of such an endeavor."

Vocalist Rody Walker stated, "This record was extremely difficult for me personally. With my first child on the way, I built a studio in my basement to ensure I wasn't leaving my wife alone with a new child for weeks on end. I haven't left my house since." He blew his voice during touring in 2018 which caused him to take a break for a year to recover. Recording was completed in November 2019.

== Concept ==
Walker described the concept of the album in an interview with Loudwire, "Well, it was being written like three years ago. Trump had just taken office and all this stuff was happening; all the MAGA hats were out in full force and all sorts of stuff like that. And I started thinking about the definition of greatness. And I have a feeling people are going to view this as though it's talking negatively about the United States, and that is not entirely it, because the greatness that Donald Trump and all his cronies want to return to is only great for the old, white, male, rich elite".

"That is the greatness of America that the rest of the world views as its tragic flaw. And I wanted to discuss that aspect of things, but I also wanted to discuss the greatness that we actually view as America's greatness. Because there is greatness, there's beauty, there's all sorts of stuff. There's innovation, there’s an incredible history. And I wanted to discuss both the negative and the positive and identify what I personally find the greatness to be."

This album uses various lyrical subjects including Amelia Earhart, Florence Owens Thompson, Franklin Delano Roosevelt, Peg Entwistle, John Dillinger, the Hindenburg disaster, the Lakota, the Great Depression, and the Great Molasses Flood.

== Critical reception ==
Professional ratings
Review scores
| Source | Rating |
|---|---|
| Distorted Sound | 9/10 |
| Metal Storm | 8.3/10 |
| Sputnikmusic | 4/5 |

At Sputnikmusic, Channing Freeman stated, "Though the title of Palimpsest is intended to describe the way Americans rewrite their history in favorable ways, it can be applied to the history of Protest the Hero as well. They have consistently reinvented themselves from seemingly blank slates on which the past is faintly visible. The breakneck leads and spastic riffing of Kezia and Fortress have been refined and molded to better suit an older, wiser band. Whatever comes next, traces of Palimpsest will hopefully remain."

Reviewer Andy Synn of No Clean Singing said in an unrated review, "In simple terms, Palimpsest is the sound of a band renewed and reinvigorated, combining the epic vibe of Fortress (still, for many, the band's magnum opus), with the more lithe and limber, shoot-for-the-moon, approach of their debut album, Kezia". Synn concluded, "That being said, don't go thinking that this new record is simply a throwback to the group's early years (both musically and thematically nothing could be further from the truth), as it definitely incorporates all the lessons which they learned making Scurrilous and Volition too, as well as some unexpected new tricks and twists."

== Track listing ==
All lyrics are written by Rody Walker.

| No. | Title | Subject | Length |
|---|---|---|---|
| 1. | "The Migrant Mother" | Florence Owens Thompson | 3:50 |
| 2. | "The Canary" | Amelia Earhart | 4:27 |
| 3. | "From the Sky" | Hindenburg disaster | 6:14 |
| 4. | "Harborside" (instrumental) | | 1:01 |
| 5. | "All Hands" | Great Molasses Flood | 4:40 |
| 6. | "The Fireside" | Franklin D. Roosevelt and the fireside chats | 5:03 |
| 7. | "Soliloquy" | Baby Face Nelson | 4:30 |
| 8. | "Reverie" | John Dillinger | 5:26 |
| 9. | "Little Snakes" | Mount Rushmore and the Lakota | 4:56 |
| 10. | "Mountainside" (instrumental) | | 1:11 |
| 11. | "Gardenias" | Peg Entwistle | 4:57 |
| 12. | "Hillside" (instrumental) | | 0:39 |
| 13. | "Rivet" | | 5:35 |
| Total length: | | | 53:29 |

== Personnel ==
=== Band members ===
- Rody Walker – vocals
- Luke Hoskin — guitar
- Tim MacMillar – guitar, piano
- Mike Ieradi – drums
- Cam McLellan — bass

=== Other personnel ===
- Derya Nagle — production
- Milen Petzelt-Sorace – production, orchestral arrangement
- Todd Kowalski — bass on track 2
- Anthony Kalabretta — vocal production, engineering
- Dean Hadjichristou — drum production, engineering, editing
- Darren "Jeter" Magierowski — additional engineering, editing
- Jill Zimmermann — additional engineering, editing
- Simon Grove — assistant engineering, mixing
- Ermin Hamidovic — mastering
- Martin Wittfooth — album artwork
