= Juno Award for Heavy Metal Album of the Year =

Canadian music award

The Juno Award for Metal/Hard Music Album of the Year is an annual award, presented by the Canadian Academy of Recording Arts and Sciences (CARAS) to honour the year's best album by a Canadian artist in the genres of heavy metal. The album is open to all subgenres of heavy metal. Rock, punk, crossover and hardcore artists are not eligible for this category.

The award was introduced by the Juno Awards in September 2011, and was presented for the first time at the 2012 Juno Awards. The five nominees and winner in the category are chosen by a panel of judges selected from the Canadian music industry. The award was named "Juno Award for Metal/Hard Music Album of the Year" in 2012, though it was renamed for the 2016 ceremony "in order to more clearly define the category criteria" before changing back in 2017.

== Recipients ==
=== Metal/Hard Music Album of the Year (2012–2015) ===
Year	Winner	Album	Nominees	Ref.
2012	KEN Mode	Venerable	Juggernaut of Justice – Anvil; Burning Fortune – Cauldron; Die Miserable – Fuck the Facts; Deconstruction – Devin Townsend Project	
2013	Woods of Ypres	Woods 5: Grey Skies & Electric Light	Dead Set on Living – Cancer Bats; Blacklands – Castle; Epicloud – Devin Townsend Project; Caligvla – Ex Deo	
2014	Protest the Hero	Volition	Heart of Oak – Anciients; Colored Sands – Gorguts; Entrench – KEN Mode; Dead Language – The Flatliners	
2015	Devin Townsend Project	Z²	Waiting for the End to Come – Kataklysm; Brotherhood of the Ram – Shooting Guns; Negative Qualities – Single Mothers; Chasing the Dream – Skull Fist	

=== Heavy Metal Album of the Year (2016) ===
Year	Winner	Album	Nominees	Ref.
2016	Kataklysm	Of Ghosts and Gods	Searching for Zero – Cancer Bats; Never Wanna Die – Diemonds; Desire Will Rot – Fuck the Facts; Success – KEN Mode	

=== Metal/Hard Music Album of the Year (2017–present) ===
Year	Winner	Album	Nominees	Ref.
2017	Mandroid Echostar	Coral Throne	Transcendence – Devin Townsend Project; Pacific Myth – Protest the Hero; Beast – Despised Icon; Suicide Society – Annihilator	
2018	Anciients	Voice of the Void	Relentless Mutation – Archspire; II: Vanishing – Longhouse; Strange Peace - METZ; Striker – Striker	
2019	Voivod	The Wake	Algorythm – Beyond Creation; The Spark That Moves – Cancer Bats; Loved – KEN Mode; Prevail II – Kobra and the Lotus	
2020	Striker	Play to Win	Orphans – The Agonist; Evolution – Kobra and the Lotus; Martyr – Lindsay Schoolcraft; Through a Wall – Single Mothers	
2021	Unleash the Archers	Abyss	Ballistic, Sadistic — Annihilator; Unconquered — Kataklysm; Palimpsest — Protest the Hero; Glory, Glory! Apathy Took Helm! — Vile Creature	
2022	Archspire	Bleed the Future	Days Before the World Wept — The Agonist; Eternal Blue — Spiritbox; Lifeblood — Brand of Sacrifice; Power Trio — Danko Jones	
2023	Voivod	Synchro Anarchy	Merciless Destruction — Get the Shot; Paid in Full — Skull Fist; Psychic Jailbreak — Cancer Bats; Thought Form Descent — Wake	
2024	Cryptopsy	As Gomorrah Burns	Danko Jones, Electric Sounds; Kataklysm, Goliath; KEN Mode, Void; Voivod, Morgöth Tales	
2025	Anciients	Beyond the Reach of the Sun	Kittie, Fire; Spiritbox, The Fear of Fear; Striker, Ultrapower; Devin Townsend, PowerNerd	
2026	Despised Icon	Shadow Work	Counterparts, Heaven Let Them Die; Cryptopsy, An Insatiable Violence; Silverstein, Antibloom; Unreqvited, A Pathway to the Moon	
