= Juno Awards of 2017 =

Edition of Canadian music award ceremony

- The 2017 Juno Awards Logo
- Date: 1–2 April 2017
- Venue: Canadian Tire Centre, Ottawa
- Hosted by: Bryan Adams; Russell Peters

Television/radio coverage
- Network: CTV
- Viewership: 1.272 million

The Juno Awards of 2017, honouring Canadian music achievements, were presented in Ottawa, Ontario the weekend of 1–2 April 2017. The ceremonies were held at the Canadian Tire Centre in Kanata and televised on CTV with Bryan Adams and Russell Peters as co-hosts. The duo replaced Michael Bublé, who was originally scheduled to host the show.

== Events ==
Various events associated with the awards are held in Ottawa from 27 March until the primary awards ceremony at the Canadian Tire Centre on 2 April. This was the last Juno Award Broadcast on CTV, before moving back to CBC in 2018.

The Juno Cup charity hockey game was played at TD Place Arena on 31 March. The NHL former players team beat the musicians team with a score of 13-12.

A Songwriters' Circle event was hosted by Bruce Cockburn on 2 April at the National Arts Centre. Daniel Caesar, Chantal Kreviazuk, Lisa LeBlanc, Colin Linden, Paul Murphy and Donovan Woods performed. CBC Radio broadcast recordings of this event.

=== Gala dinner ===
Most award category winners were announced at a private dinner gala 1 April at the Shaw Centre hosted by musician and CBC Radio host Tom Power. The late Leonard Cohen won the Artist of the Year category; his son Adam accepted the award on his behalf at the gala. The Tragically Hip won Rock Album of the Year for their album Man Machine Poem. Secret Path, the solo album by Tragically Hip lead singer Gord Downie, won Junos in two categories: Adult Alternative Album and Recording Package of the Year. Drake did not win any of his several nominations at the gala and The Weeknd won in only the R&B/Soul Recording category for his Starboy album.

=== Primary ceremony ===
The televised award ceremony on 2 April was hosted by Bryan Adams and Russell Peters. Performers included Arkells, Alessia Cara, Billy Talent, Dallas Smith, July Talk, Ruth B, Sarah McLachlan, Shawn Mendes, The Strumbellas, A Tribe Called Red.

==== Changes to host ====
Canadian singer Michael Bublé was originally scheduled to host the awards, but had cancelled public appearances due to his son's cancer diagnosis.

It was announced on 1 November 2016 that the singer would return to host of the 2017 ceremony after playing emcee in 2013. Three days later, on 3 November, Bublé made public that he would be suspending professional activities to focus on his son's treatment. At that time it was uncertain whether he would still host the Junos or its British counterpart, the Brits.

Bell Media president Randy Lennox said in an interview with The Canadian Press that initial discussions with Russell Peters began in early November when the comedian offered to take the hosting gig if Bublé needed someone else to step in. Shortly after Bublé opted to forgo the Brit Awards hosting plans, singer Adams also began talking with Juno organizers about taking a role in the Canadian broadcast.

On 9 March 2017, the Juno Awards announced that Bublé would be replaced by Adams and Peters.

==== Indigenous introduction ====
The telecast began with a sketch introducing the co-hosts prior to taking the stage. Prime Minister Justin Trudeau appeared in this segment, phoning Adams to request a performance of "Summer of '69".

Buffy Sainte-Marie appeared on stage at the Canadian Tire to declare that the event was held on traditional Algonquin territory. She then introduced A Tribe Called Red who performed music from their album We are the Halluci Nation accompanied by throat singer Tanya Tagaq.

==== Leonard Cohen tribute ====
Former Canadian prime minister Justin Trudeau and his wife Sophie Grégoire Trudeau paid tribute to musician Leonard Cohen who died in November 2016. Feist then sang Cohen's song "Hey, That’s No Way to Say Goodbye", accompanied only by her acoustic guitar and singers Ariel Engle and Daniela Gesundheit of Hydra. Cohen's album You Want it Darker was later awarded a Juno for Album of the Year. He won the Artist of the Year category during the previous night's gala.

==== McLachlan joins Hall of Fame ====
Canadian singer Sarah McLachlan was this year's inductee to the Canadian Music Hall of Fame. A video montage featuring of her career began with a tribute from former American president Bill Clinton. Sheryl Crow, Josh Groban, Diana Krall, James Taylor and Tegan and Sara also provided statements in honour of McLachlan's career.

McLachlan took the stage to make an acceptance speech which noted the presence and importance of diversity, politeness and the arts in Canadian society, declaring that "[w]e Canadians, we're far from perfect, but we have a lot to offer the world and we have to continue to set the bar high." while expressing gratitude to those who supported her career.

==== Peters controversy ====
During the ceremony broadcast, co-host Russell Peters spotted some young women in the audience and remarked "Look at all the young girls. This is a felony waiting to happen." Furthermore, when announcing that Minister of Canadian Heritage Mélanie Joly was co-presenting the Breakthrough Artist of the Year Award with musician Coleman Hell, Russell added "I don't know why, but she's hot, so who cares?" The following day, Joly declared that Peters' comments were not appropriate, indicating a need to ensure "that all our role models are supporting the importance of gender parity." Allan Reid, president of CARAS and the Juno Awards, issued an apology and distanced the Juno Awards organization from Peters' statements.

== Nominees and winners ==
Category nominees were announced on 7 February 2017.

Buffy Sainte-Marie is the 2017 recipient of the Allan Waters Humanitarian Award. It was revoked in 2025 over citizenship requirements.

Randy Lennox is the year's recipient of the Walt Grealis Special Achievement Award. Sarah McLachlan is the 2017 Canadian Music Hall of Fame inductee.

The category for Aboriginal Album of the Year was renamed to Indigenous Music Album of the Year as of the 2017 awards. The first 34 awards were announced on 1 April 2017.

=== People ===
Artist of the Year	Group of the Year
Leonard Cohen; Alessia Cara; Drake; Shawn Mendes; The Weeknd	The Tragically Hip; Arkells; Billy Talent; Tegan and Sara; The Strumbellas
Breakthrough Artist of the Year	Breakthrough Group of the Year
Ruth B; Kaytranada; Tory Lanez; Andy Shauf; Jazz Cartier	The Dirty Nil; Bleeker; Cold Creek County; Bob Moses; The Zolas
Fan Choice Award	Songwriter of the Year
Shawn Mendes; Alessia Cara; Belly; Drake; Hedley; Justin Bieber; Ruth B; The Strumbellas; The Weeknd; Tory Lanez	Gord Downie - "The Stranger", "The Only Place To Be", "Son" from Secret Path by Gord Downie; Donovan Woods - "Leaving Nashville" (co-songwriter Abe Stoklasa) from The Driver by Charles Kelley; "What Kind of Love is That" (co-songwriter Tom Douglas), "They Don't Make Anything in That Town" from Hard Settle, Ain't Troubled by Donovan Woods; Tegan Quin and Sara Quin - "Boyfriend" (co-songwriter Greg Kurstin), "100x" (co-songwriter Jesse Shatkin), "Stop Desire" from Love You to Death by Tegan and Sara; Leonard Cohen - "You Want It Darker", "It Seemed the Better Way", "Traveling Light" from You Want It Darker by Leonard Cohen; Ruth Berhe - "Lost Boy", "Superficial Love", "2 Poor Kids" from The Intro by Ruth B
Producer of the Year	Recording Engineer of the Year
A Tribe Called Red - "R.E.D." feat. Yasiin Bey, Narcy & Black Bear, "Sila" feat. Tanya Tagaq from We Are the Halluci Nation by A Tribe Called Red; Howie Beck - "Work" (co-producer Charlotte Day Wilson) from CDW by Charlotte Day Wilson; "High Five" (co-producer Dan Kurtz) from Royal Blues by Dragonette; Ian D'Sa - "Afraid of Heights", "Rabbit Down the Hole" from Afraid of Heights by Billy Talent; Nineteen85 - "One Dance", "Too Good" from Views by Drake; Eric Ratz - "The Enforcer" (co-producer Monster Truck) from Sittin' Heavy by Monster Truck; "Fever" from Dealbreaker by Royal Tusk	Jason Dufour - "Push + Pull", "Beck + Call" from Touch by July Talk; Matty Green - "Shine a Light" from Banners EP by BANNΞRS; "Armageddon" from Armageddon by Michelle Treacy; Eric Ratz - "Afraid of Heights" from Afraid of Heights by Billy Talent; "Don't Tell Me How to Live" from Sittin' Heavy by Monster Truck; George Seara - "Treat You Better", "Don't Be a Fool" from Illuminate by Shawn Mendes; Andy Shauf - "The Magician", "To You" from The Party by Andy Shauf

=== Albums ===
Album of the Year	Adult Alternative Album of the Year
Leonard Cohen, You Want It Darker; The Weeknd, Starboy; Shawn Mendes, Illuminate; Drake, Views; Céline Dion, Encore un Soir	Gord Downie, Secret Path; Basia Bulat, Good Advice; Wintersleep, The Great Detachment; Leonard Cohen, You Want It Darker; Andy Shauf, The Party
Adult Contemporary Album of the Year	Alternative Album of the Year
Sarah McLachlan, Wonderland; Céline Dion, Encore un Soir; Chantal Kreviazuk, Hard Sail; Mark Masri, Beating Heart; Heather Rankin, A Fine Line	July Talk, Touch; Black Mountain, IV; Dilly Dally, Sore; Grimes, Art Angels; Weaves, Weaves (album)|Weaves
Blues Album of the Year	Children's Album of the Year
Paul Reddick, Ride the One; Colin James, Blue Highways; Colin Linden, Rich in Love; Sean Pinchin, Monkey Brain; Whitehorse, The Northern South Vol. 1	Diana Panton, I Believe in Little Things; Raffi, Owl Singalong; Splash'N Boots, Big Yellow Tunes; Kattam, De Tombouctou à Bombay; Will Stroet, Wordplay
Classical Album of the Year – Solo or Chamber Ensemble	Classical Album of the Year – Large Ensemble or Soloist(s) with Large Ensemble Accompaniment
New Orford String Quartet, Brahms: String Quartets, Op. 51 NOS. 1 & 2; Janina Fialkowska, Schubert: Sonatas and Impromptus; Matt Haimovitz, Overtures to Bach; Stewart Goodyear, Tchaikovsky: The Nutcracker, OP. 71 TH14; Charles Richard-Hamelin, Beethoven, Enescu & Chopin: Works for Piano (Live)	Steve Wood and the Northern Cree Singers, Tanya Tagaq, Winnipeg Symphony Orchestra, Going Home Star – Truth and Reconciliation; Tafelmusik Baroque Orchestra and Chamber Choir, Beethoven Symphony No. 9; Louis Lortie, Hélène Mercier, BBC Philharmonic, Poulenc: Piano Concertos & Aubade; Jan Lisiecki, Orchestra dell'Accademia Nazionale di Santa Cecilia, Schumann; Les Violons du Roy & Mathieu Lussier, Vivaldi: Concertos
Classical Album of the Year – Vocal or Choral Performance	Contemporary Christian/Gospel Album of the Year
Montreal Symphony Orchestra, Kent Nagano, L’Aiglon; Tapestry Opera, Gryphon Trio, Elmer Iseler Singers, Dark Star Requiem; Toronto Symphony Orchestra, Toronto Mendelssohn Choir, Sir Andrew Davis, Handel Messiah; Arion Baroque Orchestre, Alexandre Weimann, Bach: Magnificat BWV 243; Daniel Taylor, The Trinity Choir, Four Thousand Winter	Tim Neufeld & the Glory Boys, Hootenanny!; Warren Dean Flandez, Eternally Grateful; Steve Bell, Where the Good Way Lies; MANAFEST, Reborn; Jaylene Johnson, Potter & Clay
Country Album of the Year	Electronic Album of the Year
Jess Moskaluke, Kiss Me Quiet; Aaron Pritchett, The Score; Chad Brownlee, Hearts on Fire; Dallas Smith, Side Effects; Gord Bamford, Tin Roof	Kaytranada, 99.9%; Holy Fuck, Congrats; A Tribe Called Red, We Are the Halluci Nation; Bob Moses, Days Gone By; Harrison, Checkpoint Titanium
Francophone Album of the Year	Indigenous Music Album of the Year
Laurence Nerbonne, XO; Karim Ouellet, Trente; Yann Perreau, Le fantastique des astres; Fred Fortin, Ultramarr; Koriass, Love Suprême	Quantum Tangle, Tiny Hands; Crystal Shawanda, Fish Out of Water; Bryden Gwiss Kiwenzie, Round Dance & Beats (Powwow); Silla + Rise, Debut; William Prince, Earthly Days
Instrumental Album of the Year	International Album of the Year
The Fretless, Bird's Nest; Sarah Neufeld, The Ridge; David Braid, Flow; Blitz//Berlin, Movements 1; Pugs & Crows and Tony Wilson, Everyone Knows Everyone	Coldplay, A Head Full of Dreams; Rihanna, ANTI; Sia, This Is Acting; One Direction, Made in the A.M.; Ariana Grande, Dangerous Woman
Jazz Album of the Year – Solo	Jazz Album of the Year – Group
Renee Rosnes, Written in the Rocks; Shirantha Beddage, Momentum; Seamus Blake, Superconductor; Brandi Disterheft, Blue Canvas; Mike Janzen, Nudging Forever	Metalwood, Twenty; Darcy James Argue's Secret Society, Real Enemies; Dave Young Quintet, One Way Up; Quinsin Nachoff's FLUX, Flux; Order of Canada Band, Sweet Canadiana
Vocal Jazz Album of the Year	Metal/Hard Music Album of the Year
Bria Skonberg, Bria; Matt Dusk & Florence K, Quiet Nights; Heather Bambrick, You'll Never Know; Barbra Lica, I'm Still Learning; Amanda Tosoff, Words	Mandroid Echostar, Coral Throne; Devin Townsend Project, Transcendence; Protest the Hero, Pacific Myth; Despised Icon, Beast; Annihilator, Suicide Society
Pop Album of the Year	Rock Album of the Year
Alessia Cara, Know-It-All; Coleman Hell, Summerland; Marianas Trench, Astoria; Shawn Mendes, Illuminate; Tegan and Sara, Love You to Death	The Tragically Hip, Man Machine Poem; Arkells, Morning Report; Monster Truck, Sittin' Heavy; Billy Talent, Afraid of Heights; Sam Roberts Band, Terraform
Contemporary Roots Album of the Year	Traditional Roots Album of the Year
William Prince, Earthly Days; Matthew Barber & Jill Barber, The Family Album; Lisa LeBlanc, Why You Wanna Leave, Runaway Queen?; Corin Raymond, Hobo Jungle Fever Dreams; Kacy & Clayton, Strange Country	The East Pointers, Secret Victory; Maria Dunn, Gathering; The High Bar Gang, Someday the Heart Will Trouble the Mind; Jenny Whiteley, The Original Jenny Whiteley; Ten Strings and a Goat Skin, Auprès du poêle
World Music Album of the Year
Okavango African Orchestra, Okavango African Orchestra; Lorraine Klaasen, Nouvelle Journée; Sultans of String, Subcontinental Drift; Turkwaz, Nazar; Nomadica, Dance of the Infidels

=== Songs and recordings ===
Single of the Year	Classical Composition of the Year
The Strumbellas, "Spirits"; Alessia Cara, "Wild Things"; Drake, "One Dance" feat. Wizkid & Kyla; Shawn Mendes, "Treat You Better"; The Weeknd, "Starboy" feat. Daft Punk	Jordan Nobles, "Immersion"; Christos Hatzis, "Going Home Star – Truth and Reconciliation"; Kati Agócs, "The Debrecen Passion"; Ana Sokolović, "And I need a room to receive five thousand people with raised glasses... or... what a glorious day, the birds are singing "halleluia""; Andrew Staniland, "Dark Star Requiem"
Dance Recording of the Year	R&B/Soul Recording of the Year
Bit Funk, "Off the Ground" feat. Shae Jacobs; Adventure Club, "Limitless" feat. Delaney Jane; Zeds Dead, Northern Lights; Shaun Frank, "Let You Get Away" feat. Ashe; Jacques Greene, "You Can't Deny"	The Weeknd, Starboy; Daniel Caesar, Pilgrim's Paradise; dvsn, Sept. 5th; PARTYNEXTDOOR, PARTYNEXTDOOR 3; Tanika Charles, Soul Run
Rap Recording of the Year	Reggae Recording of the Year
Jazz Cartier, Hotel Paranoia; Drake, Views; Belly, Another Day in Paradise; Tory Lanez, I Told You; Tasha the Amazon, Die Every Day	Exco Levi, "Siren"; Ammoye, "Sorry"; Dubmatix, "Roll 'Dem" feat. Gappy Ranks; Blessed, "Cry Every Day"; Jay Kartier, "Who Feels It Knows"

=== Other ===
Recording Package of the Year	Video of the Year
Secret Path - Gord Downie Jonathan Shedletzky (Art Director), Isis Essery (Designer), Jeff Lemire (Illustrator); Art Angels - Grimes Claire Boucher (Art Director, Designer, Illustrator), Rankin (Photographer); L'Heptade - Harmonium John Wellman, Chris Shepherd, Joshua Gearey (Art Directors); Live at Copps - Alexisonfire Justin Ellsworth (Art Director, Designer), Dustin Rabin (Photographer); Oobopopop - Valaire Karim Charlebois-Zariffa (Art Director, Designer), Olivier Charland (Illustrator), Scottie Cameron (Photographer)	"Kill v Maim" - Grimes Claire Boucher; "Killa" - Wiwek/Skrillex Jodeb; "Lite Spots" - Kaytranada Martin C. Pariseau; "R.E.D." feat. Yasiin Bey, Narcy & Black Bear - A Tribe Called Red Yassin "Narcy" Alsalman; "The Stranger" - Gord Downie Justin Stephenson
