= Gallop Meets the Earth =

Live album by Protest the Hero
- Released: September 29, 2009
- Recorded: December 18, 2008; Toronto, Ontario
- Genre: Progressive metal, metalcore, mathcore
- Length: 50:22
- Label: Underground Operations, Vagrant

Protest the Hero chronology
Fortress (2008)	Gallop Meets the Earth (2009)	Scurrilous (2011)

Gallop Meets the Earth is the first live CD/DVD by Canadian progressive metal band Protest the Hero released on September 29, 2009. The two disc package includes the band's live performance from Toronto, Ontario on audio CD and on DVD in high definition with 5.1 Surround Sound. If pre-ordered, it also comes with a T-shirt and signed Protest the Hero Poster (If pre-ordered in Canada).

The title comes from a line in the song Bloodmeat: "Thus now the fools of god will guard the city of our birth, hold an ear to the ground to hear the sound of clamoring, and horses stammer as their gallop meets the earth."

In March 2010, the DVD was certified gold by the CRIA for selling over 5,000 copies.

== Track listing ==
All tracks are written by Protest the Hero.

No.	Title	Length
1.	"Sequoia Throne"	4:23
2.	"No Stars Over Bethlehem"	4:36
3.	"Bloodmeat"	4:01
4.	"The Dissentience"	5:32
5.	"Palms Read"	3:22
6.	"Blindfolds Aside"	5:30
7.	"Goddess Bound"	3:11
8.	"Goddess Gagged"	4:44
9.	"Spoils"	2:57
10.	"Nautical"	6:39
11.	"Limb from Limb"	5:35
Total length:		50:22

=== DVD bonus features ===
- Director's cut with documentary of the set and the whole show day
- "Spoils" music video
- Whistler Outback ski adventure video
- Four live tour videos cut overtop of studio audio tracks
- "Wake and Funnel" beer adventure bonus feature
- "Stop moshing" bonus feature piece
- Protest the Hero show rider access bonus
- An angry letter from a fan
