= Kezia (album) =

Studio album by Protest the Hero
- Released: August 30, 2005
- Recorded: 2004–2005; Hamilton, Ontario
- Genres: Progressive metal; mathcore; skate punk; post-hardcore
- Length: 43:39
- Labels: Underground Operations (Canada), Vagrant (USA)
- Producer: Julius "Juice" Butty

Protest the Hero chronology
A Calculated Use of Sound (2003)	Kezia (2005)	Fortress (2008)

Singles from Kezia
- 1. "Blindfolds Aside" Released: November 2005; 2. "Heretics & Killers" Released: April 2006; 3. "The Divine Suicide of K." Released: May 17, 2007

Kezia (/kəˈzaɪə/ kə-ZY-ə) is the debut full-length album by the Canadian progressive metal band Protest the Hero, first released in Canada on August 30, 2005, by Underground Operations, later released in the US in June 2006. It is a concept album about a young girl (Kezia) sentenced to death, told from the perspectives of the various players involved in her sentencing and execution.

== Overview ==
Production began in late 2004 overseen by Julius "Juice" Butty as their producer-in-chief (known for his work on Alexisonfire's gold-selling album Watch Out!). Kezia was released in Canada on August 30, 2005, and sold 500 copies in the first week and went on to sell more than 5,000 copies in the next 2–3 weeks.

Kezia is a concept album, and was described by the band members as a "situationist requiem". In an interview from July 2006, Rody Walker describes the concept of the album:

There are two ways to explain the concept behind Kezia: the literal meaning of it and the deeper meaning behind it. The simple explanation is that you have three characters on the album who all describe a certain situation from their point of view, which is the execution of a woman. We chose a priest, a prison guard who's also the executioner and the woman in question, Kezia. They all have three songs to tell their story. In the first song they paint a general picture, the second track explains how the character feels connected to Kezia and the third one is their view on the shooting of Kezia. The last song on the album brings us as a band into the picture, although the lyrics are written in the form of Kezia's last words. The deeper meaning of the concept is the gradual downfall of our society. We tried to make the lyrics timeless, so the story could be situated in any time period. There are also political and social critical messages in it. Not that we bluntly say that we hate Tony Blair or George Bush, but more in general comments on the fact that religion and power are getting more intwined every day. The album is also about the responsibility that everyone has as a member of our society. It's your civil duty to act when you need to.

— Rody Walker

== Reception ==
Professional ratings
Review scores
Source	Rating
AbsolutePunk	(88/100)
AllMusic	4/5 stars
Metal Storm	9.5/10 stars
Metal Review	5.5/6 stars
Sputnikmusic	4/5 stars

The album received acclaim from many reviewers praising the album for its technicality and Walker's vocal range. Corey Apar of AllMusic states: "Sounding as if maximum emotion were packed into every second possible, each note of Kezia bleeds urgent passion — from the searing vocals of Rody Walker to blistering guitar leads to acoustic midsong breaks to compelling harmonies and growls alike." Furthermore, Kezia received a nomination from Toronto-based radio station 102.1 the edge for their 2005 CASBY Awards for Favorite New Indie Release.

The song "Bury the Hatchet" is available for download on the Xbox 360 version of Guitar Hero II. "Divinity Within" is also featured on the soundtrack to NHL 07.

== Videos ==
Protest the Hero's second music video, for the song "Blindfolds Aside", was released in November 2005. The video features members of the band as both condemned victims and executioners. "Blindfolds Aside" received light rotation on the Canadian music television station Much Music as well as brother channel Much Loud. The video was filmed in Toronto, Ontario.

The band filmed their third video for the song "Heretics and Killers" in mid-February 2006. It was released in April 2006. The video featured the band dressed as the flying monkeys from The Wizard of Oz who have lost their jobs (as a result of the Wicked Witch's death). The video is shot entirely in sepia until an explosive instrumental break-out in which vibrant colours are used for the remainder of the video.

On May 17, 2007, the band shot a video for their final single from Kezia, "The Divine Suicide of K". It features a more gothic setting where the members of the group sing in an imaginary bar for female vampires.

== Track listing ==
All tracks are written by Protest the Hero.

Part I: Prison Priest
No.	Title	Length
1.	"No Stars Over Bethlehem"	4:25
2.	"Heretics & Killers"	3:09
3.	"Divinity Within"	4:32

Part II: Prison Guard
No.	Title	Length
4.	"Bury the Hatchet"	3:23
5.	"Nautical"	2:57
6.	"Blindfolds Aside"	5:59

Part III: Kezia
No.	Title	Length
7.	"She Who Mars the Skin of Gods"	3:51
8.	"Turn Soonest to the Sea"	6:21
9.	"The Divine Suicide of K."	5:10

Part IV: Finale
No.	Title	Length
10.	"A Plateful of Our Dead"	4:29

== Personnel ==
=== Band members ===
- Rody Walker — vocals
- Tim MacMillar — guitar
- Moe Carlson — drums
- Luke Hoskin — guitar, piano, backing vocals
- Arif Mirabdolbaghi — bass, backing vocals

=== Other personnel ===
- Jadea Kelly — vocals
- Paul Distefano — vocals
- Julius Butty — production, recording, mixing, additional vocals
- London Spicoluk — vocals, executive production
- Lucas Venditti — vocals
- Marco Bressette — additional guitars and string arrangements
- Joao Carvalho — mastering
- Garnet Armstrong — art direction and design
- Ivan Otis — photography
