= Life in Lucidity =

Studio album by The Kindred
- Released: February 25, 2014
- Recorded: 2013
- Genre: Progressive metal, progressive rock
- Length: 49:27
- Label: Sumerian Records
- Producer: John Paul Peters

The Kindred chronology
Lore (2011)	Life in Lucidity (2014)	Weight (2017)

Professional ratings
Review scores
Source	Rating
Heavy Blog Is Heavy	link
Metal Riot	link
MetalSucks	link
Rise Above the Anchor	link
MusicReview	63% link
The Daily Star	link
The Monolith	61% link
Shredload	link

Life in Lucidity is the second full-length album by Canadian progressive metal band The Kindred. It is their first album recorded for Sumerian Records and also marks their final album with vocalist Dave Journeaux and drummer Mike Ieradi before their departures.

== Track listing ==
All songs written by The Kindred.

No.	Title	Length
1.	"Wolvish"	5:00
2.	"Heritage"	4:50
3.	"Everbound"	4:18
4.	"An Evolution of Thought"	5:39
5.	"Decades"	5:43
6.	"Millennia"	4:20
7.	"A Grand Debate"	3:58
8.	"Seekers & Servants"	5:08
9.	"Dreambender"	4:09
10.	"Like a Long Life"	6:22
Total length:		49:27

== Personnel ==
The Kindred

- Dave Journeaux – vocals
- Ben Davis – guitar
- Steve Rennie – guitar
- Mike Ieradi – drums
- Eric Stone – bass guitar
- Matt Young – keyboard

Production

- Produced/engineered/mixed by John Paul Peters
- Mastered by Ed Brooks

Additional personnel

- Amanda Buhse – choir/chorus
- Jeff Buhse – choir/chorus
- Rachal Moody – violin
- Kristel Peters – choir/chorus
- Mike Plummer – trumpet
- Scott Reimer – choir/chorus
