= Ariana Gillis =

Canadian singer-songwriter (born 1990)

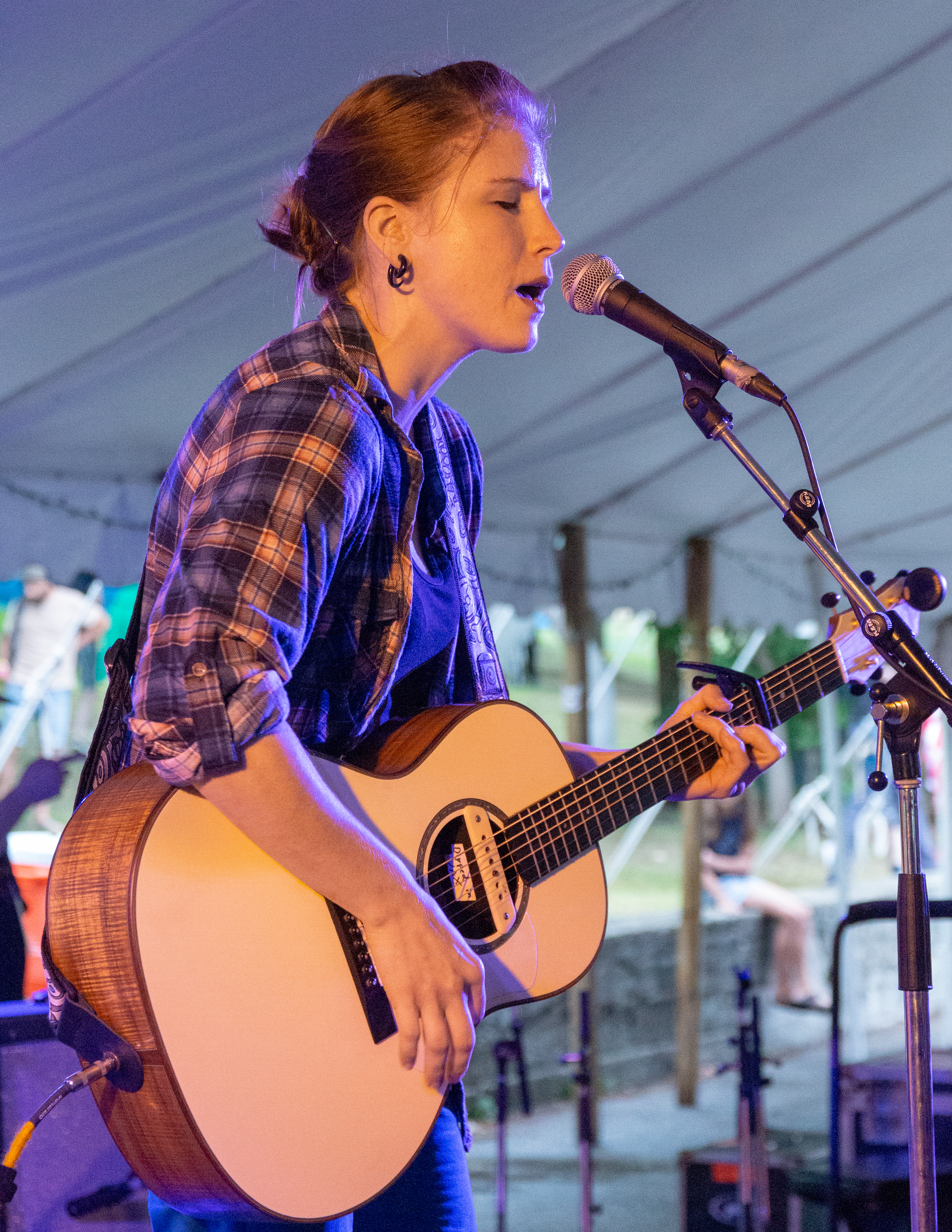
- Ariana Gillis performing at Riverfest Elora
- Born: 6 November 1990 (age 36); Hamilton, Ontario, Canada
- Occupation: Singer-songwriter
- Years active: 2009–present

Ariana Gillis (born 6 November 1990) is a Canadian singer-songwriter born in Hamilton, Ontario.

In 2011 Ariana launched her CD with a live appearance on the US satellite station SiriusXM. The show was hosted by Dave Marsh, author of more than 25 books on rock and roll and known as the "dean of American rock writers", who admits to being her biggest fan.

Bernie Taupin, Elton John's lyricist, publicly admitted on his radio show, "I'm staggered by how good she is...There is not much that impresses me these days but after hearing her available tracks. I can honestly say she's the single most exciting thing I've heard in a very long time." In 2018 she recorded "The Maze" in Nashville produced by Buddy Miller and her father David Gillis.

In March 2012, Ariana Gillis performed on the nationally syndicated NPR radio program eTown, sharing the co-bill with the British band Gomez.

== Career ==
Ariana Gillis independently released her debut album titled To Make it Make Sense in 2009. She has played at several festivals including Hillside Festival in Guelph, Mariposa Folk Festival in Orillia, Summerfolk located in Owen Sound, and Blue Skies.

In April 2009 she won a Niagara Music Award for Songwriter of the Year.

She won the 2009 Canadian Folk Music Award for Young Performer of the Year.

She has shared the stage with many artists, including Buddy Miller, Patty Griffin, Shawn Colvin, Tommy Emmanuel, Sarah Slean, Ron Sexsmith, Jadea Kelly, Eddie Schwartz, and Kevin Breit.

== Discography ==
- 2009 – To Make It Make Sense
- 2012 – Forget Me Not
