= Ms. Mary Mallon =

EP by Today I Caught the Plague
- Released: 2008
- Recorded: 2008
- Genre: Progressive Metal; Metalcore
- Length: 28:34
- Label: Independent
- Producer: Dean Hadjichristou

Today I Caught the Plague chronology
Ms. Mary Mallon (2008)	Lore (2011)

Professional ratings
Review scores
Source	Rating
Sputnik Music	link
Rockfreaks.net	link
Chroniclesofchaos.com	link

Ms. Mary Mallon is the debut EP by Canadian progressive metal band Today I Caught the Plague. Released in 2008 Independently.

== Track listing ==
All tracks are written by Today I Caught the Plague

No.	Title	Length
1.	"The Artisan Movement"	5:41
2.	"Columbella"	5:22
3.	"Curious Lives of Human Cadavera"	5:07
4.	"The God City Gunfight"	4:39
5.	"Dearest Delia,"	1:18
6.	"Dead Girls Don't Smile"	6:27
Total length:		28:34

== Personnel ==
Today I Caught the Plague

- Dave Journeaux – vocals & keyboard
- Ben Davis – guitar
- Steve Rennie – guitar
- Mike Ieradi – drums
- Matt Belanger – bass guitar

Production

- Produced by Dean Hadjichristou
- Mastered by Alan Douches
- Arrangement and Song Writing Credits to Aaron Homma, Ryan Berthiaume, and Pete Saumure
