= Striker (band) =

Canadian heavy metal

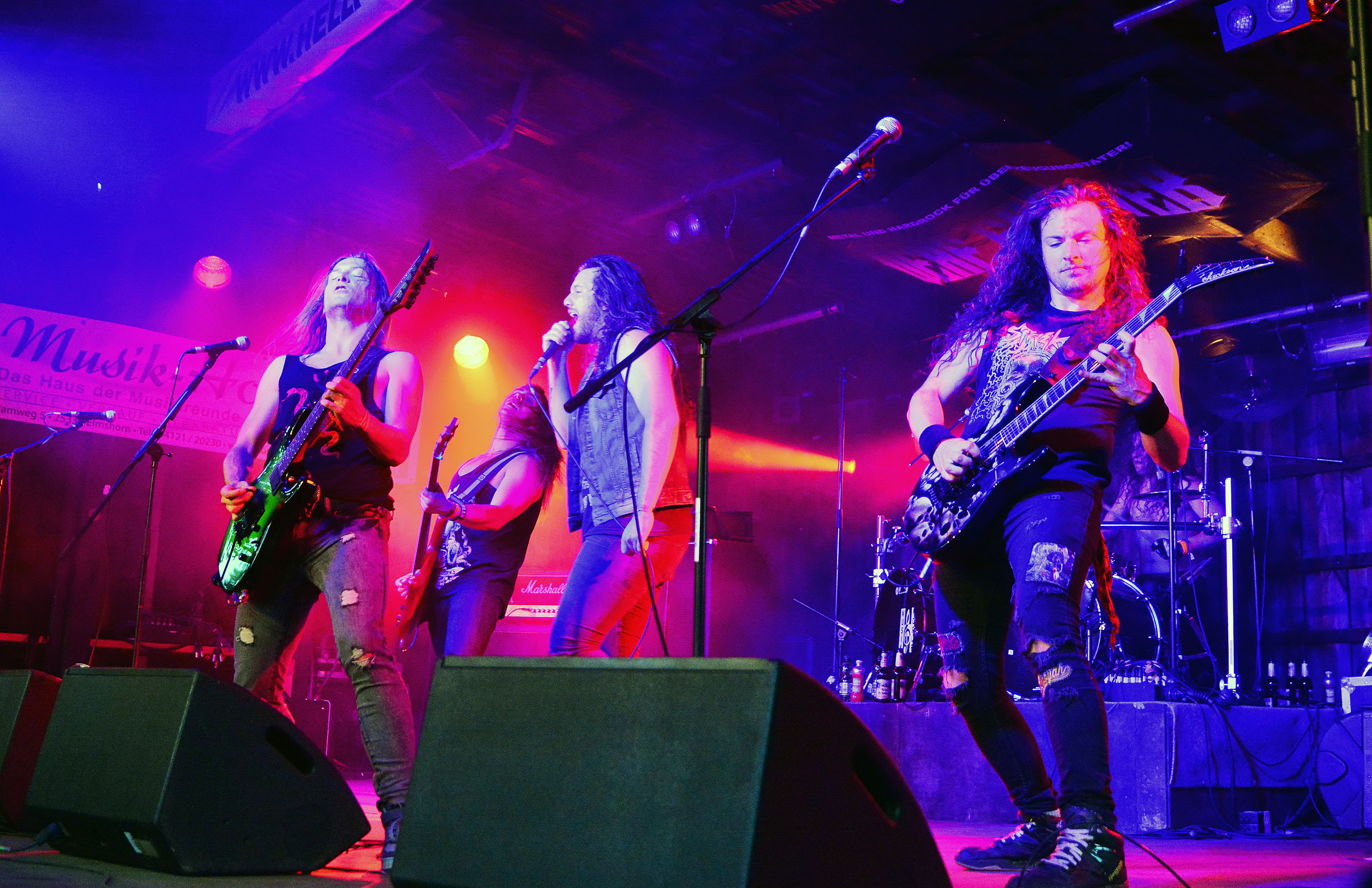
- Striker at Headbangers Open Air 2015

Background information
- Origin: Edmonton, Alberta, Canada
- Genres: Heavy metal; speed metal; power metal
- Years active: 2007–present
- Labels: Record Breaking; Napalm; Iron Kodex
- Members: Dan Cleary; Tim Brown; Pete Klassen; Jonathan Webster; John Simon Fallon
- Past members: Dave Arnold; Dave Grafton; Adam Brown; Tyson Travnik; Ian Sandercock; Magnus Burdeniuk; William Wallace; Trent Halliwell; Chris Segger
- Website: striker-metal.com

Striker is a Canadian heavy metal band from Edmonton, Alberta, formed in 2007. The band's early material had a sound influenced more by old school thrash metal, but their more recent material has a more melodic sound influenced by traditional heavy metal.

Their album Play to Win won the Juno Award for Heavy Metal Album of the Year at the Juno Awards of 2020.

== Band members ==
=== Current ===
- Dan Cleary – vocals (2007–present)
- Tim Brown – guitar (2013–present)
- Pete Klassen – bass (2019–present)
- Jonathan Webster – drums (2019–present)
- John Simon Fallon – guitar (2022–present; live 2016–2017)

=== Former ===
- Chris Segger – guitar (2007–2014, 2017–2022)
- Dave Arnold – bass (2007–2013)
- Dave Grafton – bass (2007)
- Tyson Travnik – drums (2007–2008)
- Ian Sandercock – guitar (2007–2013)
- Magnus Burdeniuk – drums (2008–2010)
- Adam Brown – drums (2010–2019)
- William "Wild Bill" Wallace – bass (2014–2019)
- Trent Halliwell – guitar (2015–2016)

== Discography ==
- Eyes in the Night (2010)
- Armed to the Teeth (2012)
- City of Gold (2014)
- Stand in the Fire (2016)
- Striker (2017)
- Play to Win (2018)
- Ultrapower (2024)
