= Mandroid Echostar =

Progressive metal band from Canada

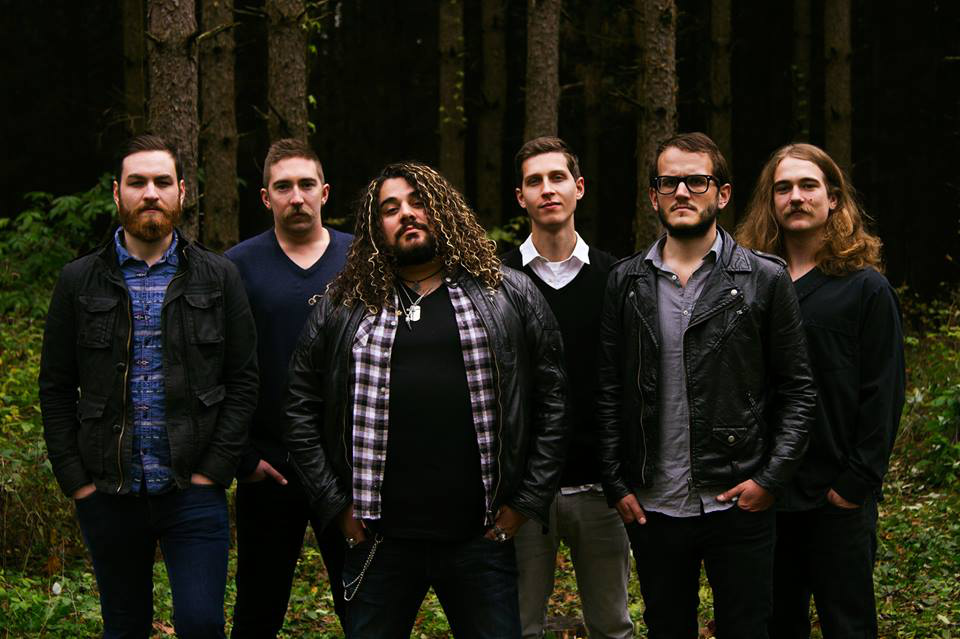

Background information
- Origin: Guelph, Ontario, Canada
- Genre: Progressive metal
- Years active: 2010–present
- Members: Michael Ciccia; Matt Kidby; Adam Richards; Sam Pattison; Stephen Richards; James Krul
- Website: mandroidechostar.bandcamp.com mandroidechostar.com

Mandroid Echostar is a six-piece heavy metal band from Guelph, Ontario, Canada. The band's sound has been described as a combination of melodic technical guitars, progressive metal, and heavy metal. The band won the Juno Award for Metal/Hard Music Album of the Year at the Juno Awards of 2017 for their album Coral Throne.

== Band members ==
The band was formed in the summer of 2010 by bassist Adam Richards, guitarist Sam Pattison, and drummer Matt Kidby. Over the remainder of 2011, guitarist/keyboardist James Krul, guitarist Stephen Richards, and vocalist Michael Ciccia were added to the line-up.

=== Current members ===
- Michael Ciccia – lead vocals
- Matt Kidby – drums
- Adam Richards - bass guitar
- Sam Pattison – guitar
- Stephen Richards – guitar
- James Krul – guitar

== History ==
=== Mandroid Echostar and Citadels ===
The band finished writing their debut self titled EP in the winter of 2011 and recorded in Sundown Studios, owned and operated by Jordan Valeriote who engineered, mixed and co-produced the EP. The album was mastered at Masterdisk in New York City by Roger Lian. The Mandroid Echostar EP was released on April 22, 2012.

Mandroid Echostar announced an Indiegogo crowdfunding campaign for their second EP, Citadels, in March 2013. The band offered merchandise and fan experience packages and eventually raised $7,500 toward the production of the EP. The band once again chose to record at Sundown Studios with Jordan Valeriote in their hometown of Guelph. Recording began on April 15, 2013, and the EP was released on November 13, 2013.

After gaining traction online, the band signed to Distort Records in late 2013.

=== Coral Throne ===
In 2014, Mandroid Echostar began writing their debut full length record and first release with Distort Entertainment. The album, Coral Throne, was recorded in December 2014 and January 2015 at Vespa Studios in Toronto, with Juno award winning producers, Eric Ratz and Harry Hess. Coral Throne was written as a concept album inspired by the histories of colonialism, cultural genocide, and the clash of organized religion and traditional spirituality.

Throughout the writing process, the band made many notable appearances such as performing in direct support of Megadeth, playing the main stage at Koifest (Kitchener) alongside Every Time I Die and Foxy Shazam, as well as the main stage at Lachie Music Festival (Cayuga Speedway - Hagersville, Ontario) with July Talk and The Trews.

In an attempt to promote Coral Throne, Mandroid Echostar embarked on the Kezia X tour across Ontario with Protest the Hero. The album was released on January 15, 2016. Ciccia was featured on the song "Cataract" by Protest the Hero which appeared on their 2016 EP, Pacific Myth.

== Discography ==
=== Studio albums ===
| Year | Album details |
|---|---|
| 2016 | Coral Throne: Released: January 15, 2016; Label: Distort / Fontana North |

=== EPs ===
- Mandroid Echostar EP (2012, Self-released)
- Citadels (2013, Crowdfunded on Indiegogo)
- Rosalia EP (2022)

== Awards and nominations ==
In 2017, Mandroid Echostar won the Juno Award for Metal/Hard Music Album of the Year for their album Coral Throne, beating out other more critically acclaimed Canadian groups such as Devin Townsend Project, Despised Icon, Annihilator, and Protest the Hero.
