= Lore (Today I Caught the Plague album) =

Studio album by Today I Caught the Plague
- Released: June 14, 2011
- Recorded: 2011
- Genre: Progressive Metal; Metalcore
- Length: 46:40
- Label: Independent
- Producer: Anthony Calabretta & Cameron McLellan

Today I Caught the Plague chronology
| Ms. Mary Mallon (2008) | Lore (2011) | Life In Lucidity (2014) |

Professional ratings
Review scores
| Source | Rating |
|---|---|
| Sputnik Music | link |
| Rockfreaks.net | link |
| Edmonton Journal | link |

Lore is the first full-length album by Canadian progressive metal band Today I Caught the Plague. Released June 14, 2011 Independently. This album doesn't feature the dirty vocal style that their 2008 EP, Ms. Mary Mallon, had opting for cleanly sung vocals only instead of the growls that were heard throughout the EP. The lyrics for this album are particular to an underlining theme of various mythologies; from Egyptian, Asian, and even Oceanic myths encompassed by the umbrella title of the album "Lore". This was the last release under the name Today I Caught the Plague.

== Track listing ==
All tracks are written by Today I Caught the Plague

| No. | Title | Length |
|---|---|---|
| 1. | "The Consequence of Fratricide" | 4:04 |
| 2. | "From Bulwark to Bane" | 3:58 |
| 3. | "Cimmerian Dusk" | 5:02 |
| 4. | "Irradiant Dawn" | 4:02 |
| 5. | "Of Fang & Flesh" | 4:34 |
| 6. | "Tempting Haiwa" | 3:13 |
| 7. | "A Cluster of Rogues" | 4:37 |
| 8. | "Sorrowbred" | 4:36 |
| 9. | "All Gallant's Oath" | 7:15 |
| 10. | "Origins (Of Measurable Being)" | 5:19 |
| Total length: | | 46:40 |

== Personnel ==
Today I Caught the Plague

- Dave Journeaux – vocals
- Ben Davis – guitar
- Steve Rennie – guitar
- Mike Ieradi – drums
- Eric Stone – bass guitar
- Matt Young – keyboard

Production

- Produced by Anthony Calabretta & Cameron McLellan
