= Grind the Ocean =

Studio album by The Safety Fire
- Released: February 27, 2012
- Genre: Progressive metal
- Length: 47:41
- Label: InsideOut Music/Century Media
- Producer: Derya 'Dez' Nagle

The Safety Fire chronology
Sections EP (2009)	Grind the Ocean (2012)	Mouth of Swords (2013)

Professional ratings
Review scores
Source	Rating
MetalSucks	link
Sputnikmusic	link
Ultimate Guitar	7.7/10 link

Grind the Ocean is the debut studio album from UK based progressive metal band The Safety Fire. The album was initially due to be released on February 27, 2012 in Europe and the February 28, in North America. However, the official release date was pushed back to April 9, 2012 in Europe and April 10, 2012 in North America. Anyone who pre-ordered the album from the band's official website, received a special edition of the album on the original set release dates. The album was mastered by Jens Bogren at Fascination Street Studios.

== Track listing ==
No.	Title	Length
1.	"Huge Hammers"	6:26
2.	"Floods of Colour"	6:25
3.	"DMB (FDP)"	5:23
4.	"Anomalous Materials"	1:52
5.	"Animal King"	5:58
6.	"Circassian Beauties"	6:10
7.	"Sections (feat. Martin Goulding & Pin)"	6:14
8.	"Seagraves"	2:13
9.	"Grind the Ocean"	7:00

== Personnel ==
- Sean McWeeney – vocals
- Derya 'Dez' Nagle – guitars, producer
- Joaquin Ardiles – guitars
- Lori Peri – bass
- Calvin Smith – drums
