= Mouth of Swords =

Studio album by The Safety Fire
- Released: 2 September 2013
- Genre: Progressive metal, progressive rock
- Length: 46:40
- Label: Inside Out Music/Century Media Records
- Producer: Derya 'Dez' Nagle

The Safety Fire chronology
Grind the Ocean (2012)	Mouth of Swords (2013)

Mouth of Swords is the second studio album from UK-based progressive metal band The Safety Fire. The album was released on 2 September 2013 in Europe and 3 September in North America.

== Release and promotion ==
Vocalist Sean McWeeney had this to say about the completion of the record: "Since our first album we've all concentrated more on having awesome haircuts and facial hair. Does that go some way to explaining why Mouth of Swords is shit hot? Some may suggest so. But all I know is I'm on it and that's enough for most people. This album is pure gold, and will be priced accordingly."

Guitarist and producer Derya 'Dez' Nagle had this to add about the release announcement and album recording: "I must have said 'there is no topping Winger's 1988 classic "Winger"' on a daily basis during the recording process. I've never been wrong about anything in my whole life, so it was a rather humbling experience to realise that what we were creating was in fact better than Winger's 1988 classic, 'Winger'. I felt like a bozo deluxe. After a while I came to accept that we had created the best album of all time, ever, in the history of known time. The burden of holding such musical gold was too much for us to handle and the band agreed to release it through InsideOut Music, on 2 September. I'd like to think the music can speak for itself, but music can't speak, so I'll speak on its behalf. Hello. I hope you enjoy me."

== Track listing ==
No.	Title	Length
1.	"Mouth of Swords"	5:12
2.	"Glass Crush"	5:08
3.	"Yellowism"	5:23
4.	"Beware the Leopard (Jagwar)" (feat. Tommy Giles Rogers Jr.)	4:51
5.	"Red Hatchet"	5:29
6.	"Wise Hands"	4:07
7.	"The Ghosts That Wait for Spring"	5:46
8.	"I Am Time, the Destroyer"	3:29
9.	"Old Souls"	7:26

== Personnel ==
- Sean McWeeney – vocals
- Derya 'Dez' Nagle – guitars, production
- Joaquin Ardiles – guitars
- Lori Peri – bass
- Calvin Smith – drums
