= The Safety Fire =

British metal band

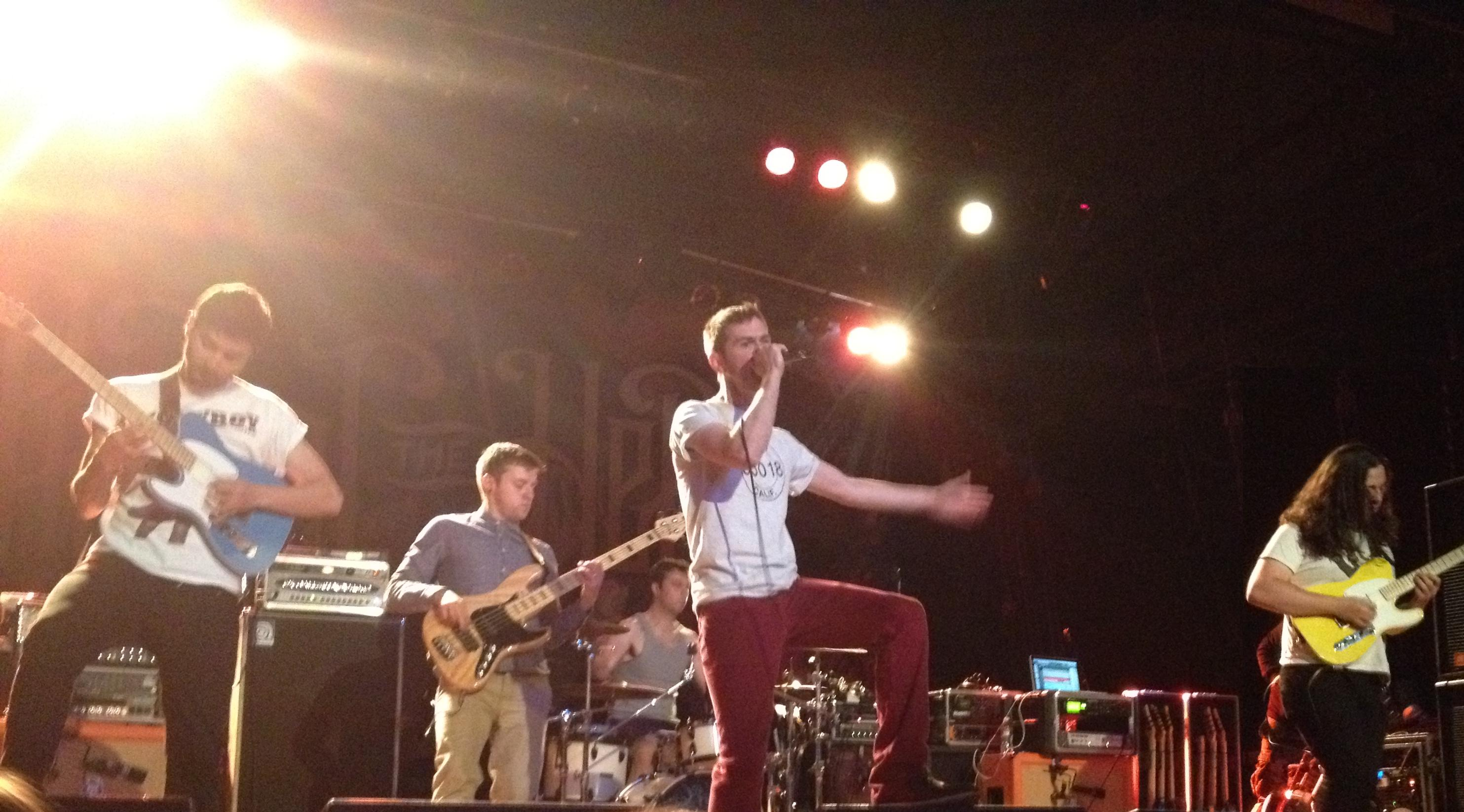
- The Safety Fire performing in Philadelphia, 2012

Background information
- Origin: London, England
- Genres: Progressive metal
- Years active: 2006–2015
- Labels: Inside Out Music
- Past members: Sean McWeeney; Joaquin Ardiles; Derya 'Dez' Nagle; Lori Peri; Calvin Smith

The Safety Fire were a British progressive metal band formed in London in 2006. The Safety Fire first made a name for themselves in the UK scene with the release of their critically acclaimed EP "Sections" in 2009 and their reputation as a powerfully energetic live band. They toured extensively across the UK with bands such as Malefice, The Arusha Accord, Bleed From Within, and Rise to Remain, as well as progressive metal bands Periphery and Monuments throughout Europe. The Safety Fire also appeared at Sonisphere Festival UK in 2011 alongside Metallica, Slipknot, Mastodon, and The Mars Volta.

== Formation and Sections EP ==
With the exception of Calvin Smith, The Safety Fire met at the London Oratory School in South West London. Lori Peri and Derya Nagle had both started playing their respective instruments at the age of 14, and started a band together. From there Derya recruited his class friend Joaquin Ardiles and Lori recruited Calvin Smith whom he had known since the age of 4 to play guitars and drums respectively. Eventually the band settled on Lori's friend Sean McWeeney as the vocalist, whom also attended their school. During this period they played the London music circuit extensively under multiple different names, eventually playing at the Mean Fiddler which was a career highlight for the young band, due to the historic nature of the venue. It was not until 2006 that the band decided to take a new musical direction and, with it, decided to go by the name, The Safety Fire.

From 2006 - 2009 The Safety Fire attended different Universities, focusing on their own educational endeavors, but in this time wrote their debut release in the form of the Sections EP. Garnering critical acclaim across both the printed and online press, the band toured whenever they could. After finishing university The Safety Fire went into the studio once more, to focus on maturing their sound and to record their debut album.

== Signing to Inside Out Music and Grind the Ocean ==
The Safety Fire announced signing to Inside Out Music on 23 August 2011, simultaneously releasing a lyric video for their debut single "Huge Hammers". The lyric video was well received and the band went on to tour the UK with Rise To Remain and Bleed From Within in September 2011.

The Safety Fire announced their debut album Grind the Ocean would be released through Inside Out Music on 27 February 2012 in Europe and the following day in the US.

On 14 December 2011, the band's debut single "Huge Hammers" was played by Zane Lowe on BBC Radio 1 on the feature "Next Hype". The band received further airplay by Radio 1 DJs Huw Stephens, Daniel P Carter, whilst also playing a live session for the XFM Rock show.

During March and April 2012, The Safety Fire embarked on their first tour of North America, supporting Protest the Hero. The line up also included Periphery, Jeff Loomis band and Today I Caught the Plague. In the Spring of 2012, The Safety Fire did a short UK run with French progressive metal titans Gojira, before playing a number of festivals including Download Festival and Hevy Music Festival in the UK and Brutal Assault in the Czech Republic. In October 2012 The Safety Fire toured Europe and the UK with Between the Buried and Me and Periphery and were due head out with The Faceless across the UK in January/February 2013 (this tour was later cancelled because The Faceless were unable to obtain work visas).

In March 2013, the band stated that they were entering the studio to record their second album, with a projected release date of mid-late 2013. They also traveled to BBC Scotland to take part on the British quiz show Eggheads.

== Mouth of Swords ==
On 5 June 2013, The Safety Fire announced that their second album, Mouth of Swords, was to be released on 2 September 2013, once again through Inside Out Music worldwide. The album was recorded and produced by the band's guitarist Derya Nagle, who was the producer of the band's previous album and has worked with artists such as Frank Turner (Mongol Horde), Rise to Remain and The HAARP Machine. Furthermore, upon revealing their track listing they announced that Tommy Rogers of Between the Buried and Me was to be a guest on the track "Beware the Leopard (Jagwar)".

The band headed out on their first headline tour from 4 to 9 September across the UK in support of Mouth of Swords before flying to North America to be a part of Between the Buried and Me's 'Future Sequence' tour across North America during September and October 2013, alongside The Faceless and The Contortionist. The band debuted their first single from the album, Glass Crush, on The Rock Show on BBC Radio 1 hosted by Daniel P. Carter on 7 August 2013.

Throughout January 2014 the band toured with Protest the Hero, Tesseract and Intervals across Europe, before heading back to the US for the Progressive Nation at Sea Cruise 2014 and then on tour once again with Protest the Hero and Intervals, this time also with Battlecross and Night Verses joining the tour.

Lori Peri left the band on 21 December 2014 after 12 years to pursue other interests. On 1 April 2015 the band announced their split by simply stating "We broke up". Derya and Jo went on to form the band Good Tiger.

== Musical style and influences ==
Often defined as Progressive Metal, the band themselves have mentioned artists such as Karnivool, Sikth, Opeth, Björk, Jaga Jazzist, Kaki King and Between the Buried and Me as influencing their sound. The band make use of multiple time signatures and quickly change between distorted and clean guitars. Similarly the vocal skills of Sean McWeeney switch between pitched screaming and clean vocal melodies.

== Discography ==
=== Studio albums ===
- Grind the Ocean (2012)
- Mouth of Swords (2013)

=== EPs ===
- Sections (2009)

=== Singles ===
- "Huge Hammers" (2012)
- "Floods of Colour" (2012)
- "Glass Crush" (2013)

== Videography ==
- "Huge Hammers" (2011)
- "Floods of Colour" (2012)
- "DMB (FDP)" (2012)
- "Red Hatchet" (2013)
- "Yellowism" (2013)
- "Mouth of Swords" (2013)
- "Glass Crush" (2014)
- "Wise Hands" (2014)
