= Coral Throne =

Studio album by Mandroid Echostar
- Released: 15 January 2016
- Recorded: 2015
- Genre: Progressive metal
- Length: 45:09
- Label: Distort Entertainment, Fontana North

Mandroid Echostar chronology
Citadels (2013)	Coral Throne (2016)

Professional ratings
Review scores
Source	Rating
ItDjents	link
Alternative Press	link
Exclaim!	link
Metal Underground	link
Rock N Reel Reviews	link

Coral Throne is the first full-length album by Canadian progressive metal band Mandroid Echostar. The album won the Juno Award for Metal/Hard Music Album of the Year at the Juno Awards of 2017.

== Track listing ==
No.	Title	Length
1.	"Hypnos"	4:58
2.	"The Lotus"	3:14
3.	"Matoax"	4:16
4.	"Sacred Fire"	3:46
5.	"Metatron"	3:29
6.	"Violet Skies"	4:58
7.	"Paladin"	5:32
8.	"Midnight Sun"	3:33
9.	"Iron Hands"	4:36
10.	"Zelos"	6:47
Total length:		45:09
