= Anciients =

Canadian heavy metal band

- Origin: Vancouver, British Columbia, Canada
- Genres: Heavy metal, progressive metal, sludge metal
- Years active: 2011–present
- Label: Season of Mist
- Members: Kenny Cook; Mike Hannay; Brock MacInnes; Rory O'Brien; Justin Hagberg
- Past members: Chris Dyck; Aaron "Boon" Gustafson
- Website: www.anciients.net

Anciients are a Canadian heavy metal band from Vancouver, British Columbia. The band's current lineup includes singer/guitarist Kenny Cook, drummer Mike Hannay, guitarist Brock MacInnes, and bassist Rory O'Brien.

== History ==
The band was formed in 2011 by Cook and Hannay, with bassist Aaron "Boon" Gustafson and guitarist Chris Dyck. Cook, Gustafson, and Dyck were all previously in the band Spread Eagle (not to be confused with a New York hard rock band of the same name). Anciients released their debut album, Heart of Oak, in 2013 on Season of Mist. The album was named a long-listed nominee for the 2013 Polaris Music Prize.

In spring 2013, the band toured part of the United States as an opening act for Lamb of God. In fall 2013, they were slated to tour both Canada and the United States as an opening act for selected dates on Sepultura's "Tsunami of Metal" tour, although the tour was cancelled due to Sepultura's difficulties in obtaining travel visas to enter the United States.

Dyck left the band in January 2017 and was replaced by Brock MacInnes, after the band had recorded their second album Voice of the Void. The album was released in October of that year, and won the award for Heavy Metal Album of the Year at the Juno Awards of 2018. Gustafson left the band in 2023 and was replaced by Rory O'Brien. Their third album Beyond the Reach of the Sun was released in 2025, and earned the band their second Juno Award for Heavy Metal Album of the Year.

== Band members ==
Current

- Kenny Cook – vocals, guitar (2011–present)
- Mike Hannay – drums (2011–present)
- Brock MacInnes – guitar (2017–present)
- Rory O'Brien – bass (2023–present)
- Justin Hagberg - keyboards (2026–present)

Former

- Chris Dyck – guitar (2011–2017)
- Aaron "Boon" Gustafson – bass (2011–2023)

== Discography ==
Studio albums

- Heart of Oak (2013)
- Voice of the Void (2016)
- Beyond the Reach of the Sun (2024)

EPs

- Snakebeard (2011)
