= Scurrilous =

Studio album by Protest the Hero
- Released: March 22, 2011
- Recorded: 2010 at Jukasa Studios, Ohsweken, Ontario and Metalworks Studios, Mississauga, Ontario and Iguana Studios, Toronto Ontario
- Genre: Progressive metal, post-hardcore, thrash metal
- Length: 44:18
- Label: Underground Operations, Vagrant, Boundee/Lively Up
- Producer: Julius Butty

Protest the Hero chronology
Gallop Meets the Earth (2009)	Scurrilous (2011)	Volition (2013)

Scurrilous is the third studio album by Canadian progressive metal band Protest the Hero. It was released on March 22, 2011. The word scurrilous is defined as "vulgar verbal abuse; foul-mouthed; coarse, vulgar, abusive, or slanderous."

It is the last album released under Protest the Hero's original lineup, due to the departure of drummer Moe Carlson and bassist Arif Mirabdolbaghi two years later.

== Overview ==
Recording for Scurrilous began on August 30, 2010. Walker stated on his Twitter page on that day: "it has begun" and also on his Facebook page on the 31st that "It is underway", both in reference to the band's next full-length album recording. During the recording process, Protest the Hero posted three studio updates showcasing bass, drums, guitar and vocals. The band has stated that the album will contain a more "progressive" sound compared to their last two albums.

In support of the album, Protest the Hero embarked on a North American tour, with a large number of dates in their native Canada, from March to May 2011.

The band released the first single "C'est La Vie" on February 3, 2011.

== Cover art ==
The album cover is a picture of a 60-year-old painting by bassist Arif Mirabdolbaghi's grandfather, Jafar Petgar, titled "Scurrilous". The painting was inspired by a disagreement between Petgar and his wife that stemmed from "conjecture and scurrilous lies" being spread by a neighbor. The painting is meant to represent the world fleeing from the lies originating from the human tongue. According to Mirabdolbaghi, the piece was selected by Protest the Hero as the cover art for Scurrilous because they "thought the wide and varied use of color in the piece reflected the contrasting sonic landscapes of the music on the album."

== Reception ==
Professional ratings
Review scores
Source	Rating
Allmusic	4/5 stars
Decibel	5/10 stars
Sputnikmusic	4/5 stars
MetalSucks	4/5 stars

Critical reception for Scurrilous has generally been positive, with the album receiving four out of five stars from Allmusic, who lauded the band for its shift toward more personal lyrics. Adam Thomas of Sputnikmusic found the album to be "a lot less jarring when compared to their past work, with the transitions between the light speed arpeggio runs, tight modern metal riffing, and mathy stop start sections seamlessly binding it all together." However, Decibel magazine gave the album a five out of ten.

== Track listing ==
All music by Protest the Hero

Standard Edition
No.	Title	Lyrics	Length
1.	"C'est La Vie"	Arif Mirabdolbaghi	3:33
2.	"Hair-Trigger"	Rody Walker	4:48
3.	"Tandem"	Walker	5:12
4.	"Moonlight"	Mirabdolbaghi	4:48
5.	"Tapestry"	Walker	4:29
6.	"Dunsel"	Walker	4:52
7.	"The Reign of Unending Terror"	Walker	3:25
8.	"Termites"	Walker	3:56
9.	"Tongue-Splitter"	Walker	4:34
10.	"Sex Tapes"	Mirabdolbaghi	4:41
Total length:			44:18

Japanese version
No.	Title	Length
11.	"To Porter, With Love"	4:47

== Trivia ==
- C'est la vie is a French figure of speech that translates to "such is life," meaning that life is sometimes harsh, but one must accept it. The phrase coincides with the lyrical content of the song which discusses the futility of suicide.
- The track title "Dunsel" is a reference to Star Trek, which all members of the band are known to be avid fans of. The term is first used in the episode "The Ultimate Computer", where Spock explains that the term is used by midshipmen to describe a position or role that serves no real purpose. This too coincides with the lyrical content of the song.

== Personnel ==
Protest the Hero

- Moe Carlson – drums
- Luke Hoskin – guitars
- Tim Millar – guitars, keys
- Arif Mirabdolbaghi – bass
- Rody Walker – vocals

Guest musicians

- Julius Butty – vocals
- Chris Hannah – vocals
- Porter Hoskin – vocals
- Jadea Kelly – vocals

Artwork and packaging

- Ben Goetting – design, layout
- Jafar Petgar – artwork

Production and recording

- Nick Blagona – engineering
- Marco Bressette – editing
- Julius "The Juice" Butty – engineering, production
- João Carvalho – mastering
- George Hadji-Christou – pre-production
- Jonny Harris – assistant engineering
- Andy Mack – guitar technician
- Darren "Jeter" Magierowski – assistant engineering
- Larry Mazer – management
- Cameron McLellan – pre-production
- Greg Pavlica – guitar technician
- Jeff Zurba – drum technician
