= The Kindred (band) =

Canadian musical group

- Origin: Ottawa, Ontario, Canada
- Genres: Progressive rock, progressive metal, metalcore (early)
- Years active: 2006–present
- Label: Sumerian
- Members: Johnny McArthur; Ben John Davis; Matt Young; Steve Rennie; Eric Stone; Kenny Saunders
- Past members: Matt Belanger; David Journeaux; Mike Ieradi
- Website: The Kindred

The Kindred is a Canadian progressive rock sextet formed in Ottawa, Ontario. Originally formed in the winter of 2006, the band released their debut EP Ms. Mary Mallon on July 4, 2008, and their debut full-length Lore on June 14, 2011, both independently. Following their name change and signing to Sumerian Records the band released Life in Lucidity in 2014. After three years and various member changes, the band released a new EP Weight, advertised as part one of their upcoming full-length to be released later in the year.

== Biography ==
=== Today I Caught the Plague (2006) ===
Following the break-up of David Journeaux and Mike Ieradi's previous band, A Legend Falls, the two formed Today I Caught the Plague. Slowly the group fleshed out their lineup, including members from Bill Furious and There Were Thousands. The group's lineup was complete with the addition of Steve Rennie from Die Nameless.

After numerous pre-production sessions the band finally entered Addictive Sound Studios with producer and good friend Dean Hadji. After a few weeks of recording the band finished their debut EP, Ms. Mary Mallon.

Following the recording of Ms. Mary Mallon, bassist Matt Belanger left the band. With an EP ready to be released and a group of musicians eager to tour, the band recruited Eric Stone and Matt Young, formerly of There Were Thousands. The band's lineup was now complete.

Ms. Mary Mallon was released on July 4, 2008, with some of the band's members being barely out of high school. Nevertheless, the band traveled throughout Canada to promote it and it received very positive reviews.

During this era the band toured with bands such as Between the Buried and Me, Protest the Hero, The Devin Townsend Project, Intronaut, The Faceless, TesseracT, and Scale the Summit among many others.

=== Lore (2011) ===
In 2011, the group went into the studio with Canadian producers Anthony Calabretta and Cameron McLellan to record their first full-length album. In June they released Lore to numerous critical acclaim.

Following the release of Lore, the band did several Canadian tours including headlining the first leg of the Lore tour in the summer of 2011. In the fall of 2011, the band embarked on the Scurrilous tour with Protest the Hero and in addition did a sting of headlining shows after. In December, they also embarked on a full Canadian tour supporting The Devin Townsend Project.

In March 2012, the band toured the US for their first time in support of Protest the Hero, Periphery, Jeff Loomis, and The Safety Fire. They also toured through the US as direct support for Scale the Summit.

=== Signing to Sumerian Records and name change (2013) ===
On May 25, 2013, the band officially announced the name change with a press release:

After 5 years of touring and creating music under Today I Caught the Plague, we have collectively decided it's time to move on. This is a choice we've made as a group and is definitely one we had some difficulty making, although we are happy we made it. There have been no changes to members and no plans to stray away from our style of writing and performing music. We are still the same people, with the same creative ideas and aspects that have led you to believe in our music over the last 5 years. We will now, and for the rest of time, be known as...THE KINDRED.

=== Life in Lucidity (2014) ===
Following the release of the singles "Decades", "Heritage", and "Everbound" the band released Life in Lucidity. This would mark their first album as The Kindred, as well as their first album for Sumerian Records. It would also, however, mark their final album with vocalist Dave Journeaux and drummer Mike Ieradi prior to their departures.

=== Lineup change and Weight/Burden EPs (2015–present) ===
On May 15, 2015, David Journeaux posted on the band's Facebook page announcing his departure from the band. Three days later the band announced Johnny McArthur as their new vocalist and Kenny Saunders as their new drummer, replacing Mike Ieradi who left the band to join Protest the Hero.

On March 3, 2017, the band released "Stray Away", their first song in three years and their first single with their new lineup. On June 21, 2017, they released the single "Saint" as a precursor to the upcoming EP Weight, which was released on July 21, 2017.

On July 21, 2017, the band released the EP Weight, advertised as part one of their upcoming full-length to be released later in the year.

On September 8, 2017, the band released the single "Judas" and announced their EP Burden, their second of the year, which was released September 29, 2017.

== Members ==
=== Current members ===
- Johnny McArthur – lead vocals
- Ben John Davis – guitar
- Steve Rennie – guitar
- Eric Stone – bass
- Matt Young – keyboard, backup vocals
- Kenny Saunders – drums

=== Former members ===
- David Journeaux – lead vocals (2006–2015)
- Mike Ieradi – drums (2006–2015)
- Matt Belanger – bass (2006–2007)
- Aaron Homma - guitar (2006)
- Pete Saumure - guitar (2006)
- Ryan Berthiaume - bass (2006)

== Discography ==
=== Albums ===
- Lore (2011 as Today I Caught the Plague)
- Life in Lucidity (2014)

=== EP ===
- Ms. Mary Mallon (2008 as Today I Caught the Plague)
- Weight (2017)
- Burden (2017)

== See also ==
- Music of Canada
- List of bands from Canada
