= João Carvalho (musical engineer) =

Canadian Recording Engineer

João Carvalho (born 1969) is a Canadian recording and mastering engineer, producer and musician who is the owner of João Carvalho Mastering and Revolution Recording Studios in Toronto, Canada.

== Biography ==
Carvalho was born in São Miguel, Azores. At the age of three, he emigrated with his family to Montreal, Quebec. The Carvalho family moved to Windsor, Ontario, four years later, where his mother was a seamstress and his father worked at the Ford Motor Company. He started his first rock band while living in Windsor with fellow students Gordie Johnson (Big Sugar) and Jerry Pergolesi.

Carvalho moved to Toronto where Jamie Stanley, a recording engineer, producer took him in as a mentor. The two eventually became partners at a studio called Umbrella Sound. He started mastering studio recordings there in 1994, and in 2003, he set up João Carvalho Mastering.

João lives in Toronto and says he has "a somewhat (un)healthy passion for cars and fine audio equipment".

== Works ==
Carvalho has worked with many artists and musicians, including many independent artists. Some credits include recordings by Alexisonfire, Arkells, BADBADNOTGOOD, Banx & Ranx, Jill Barber, The Barra MacNeils, Barzin, Black Cabbage, Blue Rodeo, Boreal, Liona Boyd, Paul Brandt, By Divine Right, Cadence Weapon, Sofia Camara, George Canyon, Change of Heart, City and Colour, Close Talker, Tom Cochrane, The Constantines, Rose Cousins, Crown Lands, Cuff The Duke, The Dears, Death From Above 1979, Glass Tiger, The Grapes of Wrath, Great Lake Swimmers, Matthew Good Band, Jenn Grant, Emm Gryner, Chris Hadfield, Sarah Harmer, Harrow Fair, Hawksley Workman, Hayden, The Headstones, Carly Rae Jepsen, July Talk, Kandle, k. d. lang, King Cobb Steelie, Jade Eagleson, Treasa Levasseur, Lights, The Lowest Of The Low, Max Webster, Said The Whale, Shawn Mendes, Sophie Milman, Preston Pablo, Pilate, Pine Grove, Protest The Hero, The Rankin Family, Reuben And The Dark, Rheostatics, Sam Roberts, Rush, Justin Rutledge, The Sadies, Ron Sexsmith, The Reklaws, The Sheepdogs, Dave Sills, Skydiggers, Sarah Slean, Tannis Slimmon, Sloan, Sue Smith, The Super Friendz, Tanya Tagaq, The Tea Party, Tegan and Sara, The Tragically Hip, Treble Charger, The Trews, The Watchmen, Walk Off the Earth, The Weakerthans, The Weather Station, Whitehorse, Charlotte Day Wilson, Donovan Woods, Hawksley Workman and Yukon Blonde.

He led album re-mastering projects for artists including Death Cab For Cutie, The Tragically Hip, Sloan, K-OS, Hawksley Workman, Stan Rogers, Glass Tiger, Scott B. Sympathy and Owen Pallett.

International project highlights include Brian Eno, Death Cab For Cutie, FUN, Barry Gibb, Olivia Newton John, Passenger, Smashing Pumpkins and The Vienna Philharmonic Orchestra.

== Awards and recognition ==
Carvalho was nominated for a 2017 Grammy Award in the category of Best Engineered Album - Non-Classical (Rose Cousins - Natural Conclusion). Carvalho has been the recipient of numerous Canadian Juno Awards with over 40 wins to his credit. He was nominated for a 2004 Juno Award in the category of Jack Richardson Producer of the Year (Pilate - Into Your Hideout).
