= Fortress (Protest the Hero album) =

Studio album by Protest the Hero
- Released: January 29, 2008
- Recorded: 2007; Hamilton, Ontario and Metalworks Studios, Mississauga, Ontario
- Genre: Progressive metal; mathcore; thrash metal
- Length: 41:10
- Label: Underground Operations (Canada), Vagrant (USA)
- Producer: Julius "Juice" Butty

Protest the Hero chronology
Kezia (2005)	Fortress (2008)	Gallop Meets the Earth (2009)

Singles from Fortress
- 1. "Bloodmeat" Released: December 12, 2007 (Canadian release only); 2. "Sequoia Throne" Released: April 25, 2008; 3. "Palms Read" Released: 2008; 4. "Spoils" Released: April 2009

Fortress is the second studio album by Canadian band Protest the Hero which was released on January 29, 2008 on Vagrant Records in the US and Underground Operations in Canada.

== Overview ==
Fortress was recorded at Silo Studios in Hamilton, Ontario during the summer of 2007. The album contains 10 tracks broken into three movements, separated by piano interludes, and is approximately 41 minutes in length. The band has stated that the sound is similar to Kezia but with a "less poppy and more technical metal" influence. Fortress does not revolve around a single concept, unlike their previous album. Instead, it is more akin to "goddess worship in the tradition of Robert Graves," according to their bassist and lyricist Arif Mirabdolbaghi:

"It has to do with goddess worship, and how there has been this degendering of the Lord and Savior, and the suppressed feminine. A lot of it is based in Genghis Khan and old Irish Mythology, about the rise and fall of the Goddess of the forest. [The theme] can be more appreciated by more people. If I had to reduce it to its simplest form, the concept is about the re-emerging of goddess worship and the erosion of faith in scientific process."

Also, states lead singer Rody Walker:

"This album is nothing to be intellectualized. All talk of wonder, pathos and optimism aside. I feel it’s a very natural progression for us. A natural progression into further obscurity. I am of the belief a lot of the people who work for us were hoping for a stab at a more commercially viable album, however we wrote what we wanted without linear boundaries and created something less commercial than ever. Some fans of the band will hate it. And some people who hate the band will love it. All others can rot."

== Singles ==
In January, a music video was shot for the song "Bloodmeat", which is available on the MuchMusic website. As of December 11, "Bloodmeat" is available for download on the Canadian iTunes Music Store. Additionally, the band released the song "Sequoia Throne" on their MySpace page audio player, but was later replaced with "Bloodmeat".

A music video for the song "Sequoia Throne" was filmed and released in April, and was also made available on the MuchMusic website. Another video, this one for "Palms Read", began filming in September under director Sean Michael Turrell, and was released in late October. A fourth video was also directed by Sean Mitchell Turner for the fourth and final single, "Spoils". The video was released in December.

== Critical reception ==
Professional ratings
Aggregate scores
Source	Rating
Metacritic	86/100
Review scores
Source	Rating
AllMusic	4/5 stars
Alternative Press	4/5 stars
The A.V. Club	A
Cokemachineglow	36%
Consequence of Sound	4.5/5 stars
Metal Injection	9/10
MetalSucks	5/5 stars
Now	4/5 stars
The Skinny	3/5 stars
Sputnikmusic	4.5/5

Fortress debuted at No. 95 on the US Billboard Top 200 chart with first week sales of 7,600 copies, also managing No. 10 spot on the Billboard Top Independent Album chart. In Canada, the album achieved No. 1 status the first week of its release. Mike Portnoy named this album one of his favourite albums of 2008 on his official web page.

Fortress, like its predecessor Kezia, achieved universal acclaim with high regards from many major publications, receiving a comprehensive score of 86 on Metacritic making it the 12th best reviewed album on the site for 2008. Tyler Patrick Munro of SputnikMusic states: "The album improves on everything established on Kezia (right down to the much more natural sounding piano codas), and it does so without the sometimes blatant repetition of its predecessor." He cites the track "Bone Marrow," stating: "While 'Bone Marrow' places more emphasis on the underpinning synths of the first two tracks, its heavy orchestration still takes a backseat to its varying structure, which fluidly transits from hyper-melodic up-tempo to ball-crushing gutturals and chugged syncopation, all of which are made twice as effective by the interwoven bass slapping," and compares the style of the opener "Bloodmeat" to the dissonance of The Dillinger Escape Plan and Converge. John A. Hanson, also reviewing for Sputnikmusic, writes: "[W]ith Fortress, Protest the Hero have almost shed all of their past imperfections and crafted something really special," going on to praise frontman Rody Walker for his vocal range and improvement since Kezia. Katherine Fulton of AllMusic praised the band for their originality and boldness, writing: "More risks are taken, from the nearly hidden horns on 'The Dissentience' to the shimmering piano solo at the beginning of 'Sequoia Throne' and the playful interlude that bridges 'Palms Read' and 'Limb from Limb,'" though she ultimately criticized the album's "frantic" pace.

== Track listing ==
Fortress is broken up into three sections, all of which are titled, except the second section though it is often referred to as the album title. An intro track before "Bloodmeat" can be found by rewinding from the CD from the beginning. This pre-gap is not detected by iTunes.

(untitled) (Intro)
No.	Title	Length
0.	"(untitled)"	0:54

All tracks are written by Protest the Hero.

On Conquest and Capture
No.	Title	Length
1.	"Bloodmeat"	3:54
2.	"The Dissentience"	4:23
3.	"Bone Marrow"	5:30

(untitled) (Fortress)
No.	Title	Length
4.	"Sequoia Throne"	3:11
5.	"Palms Read"	5:06
6.	"Limb from Limb"	4:22
7.	"Spoils"	3:43

Isosceles
No.	Title	Length
8.	"Wretch"	4:12
9.	"Goddess Bound"	3:35
10.	"Goddess Gagged"	3:14
Total length:		41:10

== Personnel ==
- Rody Walker - vocals
- Luke Hoskin - guitar, piano, backing vocals
- Tim Millar - guitar, piano
- Arif Mirabdolbaghi - bass, backing vocals
- Moe Carlson - drums

=== Additional personnel ===
- Vadim Pruzhanov - keyboards on the track "Limb From Limb".
- Dan Fila - Additional percussion
- Julius "Juice" Butty - Producer, backing vocals
- Mark Spicoluk - Executive producer
- Nick Blagona - Engineer
- Sons of Nero - artwork

== Charts ==
Chart	Provider(s)	Peak position	Weeks on chart
Canadian Album Chart	CRIA	1	2
Top Independent Albums	Billboard	10	3
Top Hard Rock Albums	Billboard	14	1
U.S. Billboard 200	Billboard	95	1

== Other sources ==
- "Amazon". Blabbermouth.net. Archived from the original on February 9, 2008.
- "Blabbermouth". Archived from the original on February 9, 2008.
