= Volition (Protest the Hero album) =

Studio album by Protest the Hero
- Released: October 29, 2013
- Recorded: Late 2012–2013 at Revolution Recording, Toronto, Ontario & at Sunset Division, Toronto, Ontario
- Genre: Progressive metalcore, mathcore, post-hardcore, thrash metal
- Length: 54:07
- Label: Razor & Tie
- Producer: Cameron McLellan

Protest the Hero chronology
Scurrilous (2011)	Volition (2013)	Pacific Myth (2016)

Alternative covers
- 12" vinyl cover

Alternative cover

Singles from Volition
- 1. "Clarity" Released: 5 September 2013; 2. "A Life Embossed" Released: 17 October 2013; 3. "Underbite" Released: 7 November 2013; 4. "Tilting Against Windmills" Released: 3 March 2014; 5. "Mist" Released: 5 August 2014

Volition is the fourth studio album by Canadian progressive metal band Protest the Hero released on October 29, 2013, through Razor & Tie. It is the band's first album not to be released through Underground Operations or with any financial backing of label support. Instead, the entire album was funded by their fans via an Indiegogo campaign, where they met and exceeded their goal of $125,000 CAD.

It is the first album of the band to not feature its original lineup. It features Chris Adler from Lamb of God on drums after the departure of founding member Moe Carlson, who left the band prior to the recording process. It is also the band's last album with bassist Arif Mirabdolbaghi.

On October 16, due to the album being leaked, the band released the content early to contributors of their IndieGoGo campaign.

The album debuted at No. 20 on the Billboard 200 in the U.S.

== Critical reception ==
Professional ratings
Review scores
Source	Rating
AllMusic	3.5/5 stars
Alternative Press	3.5/5 stars
Loudwire	4/5 stars

At Alternative Press, Kevin Stewart-Panko stated that "[Protest the Hero] have long been the tenuous link between metal old and new, and Volition continues their polished combination of technical thrash, punkish melodies and mining of disparate influences, from '80's maestros Watchtower and Toxik to energy drink mayhem like DragonForce and NOFX." Loudwire's Chad Bowar described the album as "a wild ride that's grounded in excellent musicianship and innovative songwriting".

Chris Adler's involvement on the album was praised, with one reviewer saying that, while "[Protest the Hero's] progressive/metalcore/mathcore/post-hardcore style is nothing like Lamb of God’s... Adler is an extremely skilled player and had no problem fitting right in."

The album won the 2014 Juno Award for Metal/Hard Music Album of the Year.

== Track listing ==
All lyrics are written by Rody Walker.

No.	Title	Music	Length
1.	"Clarity"	Luke Hoskin, Cameron McLellan	5:32
2.	"Drumhead Trial"	Hoskin, McLellan	4:28
3.	"Tilting Against Windmills"	Moe Carlson, Hoskin, Tim Millar	4:12
4.	"Without Prejudice"	Hoskin, McLellan	4:15
5.	"Yellow Teeth"	Hoskin, McLellan	4:08
6.	"Plato's Tripartite"	McLellan, Walker	5:22
7.	"A Life Embossed"	Carlson, Hoskin, Millar	5:33
8.	"Mist"	Hoskin, Millar	5:52
9.	"Underbite"	Carlson, Hoskin, Millar	3:45
10.	"Animal Bones"	Carlson, Hoskin, Millar	4:37
11.	"Skies"	Hoskin, McLellan	6:23
Total length:			54:07

== Personnel ==
=== Protest The Hero ===
- Rody Walker — vocals
- Tim Millar — guitar, piano
- Luke Hoskin — guitar, acoustic guitar
- Arif Mirabdolbaghi – bass

=== Other personnel ===
- Chris Adler — drums
- Cameron McLellan — production, engineering, mixing, bass guitar on track 4, acoustic guitar on track 6
- Anthony Calabretta — additional production, mixing
- Julius Butty — additional production
- Jason Dufour — engineering, digital editing
- Jack Clow — assistant engineer, drum technician
- Moe Carlson - additional songwriting on tracks 3, 7, 9 and 10
- Riley Bell — assistant engineer
- Jeff Jordan — album artwork

=== Guest performances ===
- Jadea Kelly — vocals on tracks 1, 4, 5, 6
- Kayla Howran — vocals on track 2
- Mark Iannelli — vocals on track 7
- AJ Kolar — vocals on track 7
- Todd Kowalski — vocals on track 9
- Kevin Lewis — vocals on track 11
- Josh Hainge — vocals on track 11
- Marc Palin — vocals on track 11
- Ron Jarzombek — guitar on track 2
- Wyatt Schutt — guitar on track 5
- Raha Javanfar — violin, fiddle on tracks 1, 2, 5, 8
