= Sequoia Throne =

Single by Protest the Hero

from the album Fortress
- Released: April 25, 2008
- Genre: Progressive metal; mathcore
- Length: 3:11
- Label: Vagrant, Underground Operations
- Producer(s): Julius "Juice" Butty

Protest the Hero singles chronology
"Bloodmeat" (2007)	"Sequoia Throne" (2008)	"Palms Read" (2008)

"Sequoia Throne" is a song by Protest The Hero and is the second single released from their 2008 album Fortress. It was released exclusively through the iTunes online music store. In addition, a "Sequoia Throne" remix contest was announced; the three winning entries were featured on an album bundle from iTunes, and one would be included on a Metal Hammer compilation CD.

== Video information ==
The music video for "Sequoia Throne" was released April 25, 2008. The video was directed by Marc Andre Debruyne (who also directed the video for "Bloodmeat", the first single off Fortress). It features the band in an empty building at first performing the song separately in business suits & ties while lead singer Rody Walker maniacally walks through the halls singing the song. As the video progress, the band members (all except Walker) are in regular clothes running through the halls from Walker who stalks and presumably attacks and kills them off one by one. In this video, bassist Arif Mirabdolbaghi is seen with a 5-string Steinberger bass, famous for its headless design.

== Track listing (single) ==
1. "Sequoia Throne" - 3:11
2. "Sequoia Throne (Instrumental)" - 3:13
3. "Bloodmeat (Instrumental)" - 4:01

== Sequoia Throne Remix EP ==
A three-track EP was released August 5 exclusively through iTunes featuring select remixes of the song "Sequoia Throne" submitted by other artists (including Devin Townsend, record producer and founder of Strapping Young Lad). The track listing for the EP is as follows:

1. "Sequoia Throne – C0ndu1t Chupacabra Remix" - 4:53
2. "Sequoia Throne – L-Ion Remix" - 4:30 (Metal Hammer contest winner)
3. "Sequoia Throne – Devin Townsend Remix" - 7:38
