= Protest the Hero =

Canadian progressive metal band

- Protest the Hero live at Southern Ontario Metal Festival, August 2011

Background information
- Also known as: Happy Go Lucky (1999–2001)
- Origin: Whitby, Ontario, Canada
- Genres: Progressive metal, mathcore, metalcore
- Years active: 1999–present
- Labels: Spinefarm, Razor & Tie, Vagrant, Underground Operations
- Members: Rody Walker; Tim MacMillar; Luke Hoskin
- Past members: Moe Carlson; Arif Mirabdolbaghi; Mike Ieradi
- Website: protestthehero.ca

Protest the Hero is a Canadian progressive metal band formed in Whitby, Ontario, in 1999. Originally named Happy Go Lucky, the band changed their name to Protest the Hero and released their debut EP, Search for the Truth, in 2002. In 2005, the band released their first album Kezia on Canadian indie label Underground Operations.

On January 23, 2006, the band signed with Vagrant Records for Kezia's American release on April 4, 2006. Their second album, Fortress was released by Underground Operations in Canada and by Vagrant Records worldwide on January 29, 2008. The band released their third studio album, Scurrilous, on March 22, 2011.

Expressing frustrations with record labels, in January 2013 the band announced that they would crowdfund their fourth album. The Indiegogo campaign was a runaway success, and the independently-released Volition debuted on October 29, 2013, distributed with the help of Razor & Tie. In October 2015, the band announced that their next release would take the form of an EP, distributed via subscription service Bandcamp, entitled Pacific Myth.

The band started the production process of their fifth studio album in January 2018. The process was delayed due to issues with vocalist Walker's voice, which arose during the Fortress X Tour in June 2018. The album, titled Palimpsest, would release two years later on June 18, 2020.

In early June 2026, the band started teasing new material. On June 5, they released the single "Mouthpiece" with an accompanying music video, and announced their sixth studio album, Within, which was released on July 17, 2026. Within is the first material that the band fully owns.

== History ==
=== Early years (1999–2003) ===
Walker in Jan. 2004

The band started as Happy Go Lucky in 1999 and, shortly after, they recorded their first demo. In 2001 they changed their name to Protest the Hero. They released their first EP, Search for the Truth 7" vinyl, which included only two songs. They were included in the compilation (Coles) Notes from the Underground that same year. Luke Hoskin stated on his Formspring page that Search for the Truth was recorded when they were 13 years old. The day that the band members finished their senior finals, they went on a three-week "Rock the Vote" tour from Toronto to Halifax to garner recognition and raise awareness for the upcoming Canadian election.

=== A Calculated Use of Sound and Kezia (2003–2006) ===
A music video for their song "These Colours Don't Run", from the EP A Calculated Use of Sound, was released in 2003. The video begins with the band discussing the meaning of the song and features the band playing the song live at numerous locations in Toronto, with the album music dubbed over the actual live recording. At each location, the band would hand out lyrics to passers-by and encourage them to listen or sing along.

Millar in Jan. 2004

In 2004, the band recorded their debut album, which released the following year. Kezia is a concept album, described by the band members as a "situationist requiem". The album achieved universal acclaim with many reviewers praising the album for its technicality and Walker's vocal range.

From September 2005 until the beginning of June 2006, the band toured across Canada, the United States, and Great Britain in support of Kezia with bands such as Death by Stereo, Bad Religion, Anti-Flag, The Fall of Troy, The Bled, and DragonForce. They then took part in the Vans Warped Tour during the Summer of 2006. Following this, they toured with Avenged Sevenfold and 3 Inches of Blood until October 2006 when they began "The" tour with Trivium, The Sword, and Cellador, taking them across Canada and the United States. In September 2006, guitarist Luke Hoskin was detained at the Vancouver–US border for possessing a bag with less than 0.2 grams of marijuana, preventing him from continuing on their tour with Trivium and The Sword. In his place the band recruited Marco Bressette from the Canadian rock band Hypodust from September until November 2006. In November 2006, Protest the Hero toured with bands Bullet for My Valentine and As I Lay Dying. Beginning in the middle of December 2006, they embarked on a cross-Canada tour, named Bring Out Your Shred, with I Hate Sally and The Human Abstract. This tour was the first in which Kezia was played in its entirety.

=== Fortress (2006–2010) ===
In late May-early June they co-headlined the Tour and Loathing 2007 Tour with co-headliners All That Remains, Blessthefall, Threat Signal, and The Holly Springs Disaster. After extensive touring the band returned to the studio in 2007 to record their sophomore effort. The resulting album featured 10 tracks that showcased the band heading in a more technical metal style than Kezia. During the Fortress tour the band released a live album (Gallop Meets the Earth) featuring tracks from their first 2 albums. Protest the Hero played Fortress from start to finish at their shows from November 20 to December 23, 2009. This stretch marked the last of the band's shows for a while as they took the first part of 2010 to work on a new album, which was to feature a more progressive sound.

Live in Burlington, May 2007

In January 2009, Protest the Hero toured with As I Lay Dying, The Human Abstract, and Mychildren Mybride. Then they started a European Tour with The Human Abstract and The Chariot. In April 2009, they headlined the Heads Will Roll tour in the US with Misery Signals, The Number Twelve Looks Like You, Fall From Grace, and Scale the Summit. From September 8–17, 2009, they supported In Flames and Killswitch Engage with Between the Buried and Me. On November 21, 2009, at McMaster University in Hamilton, Ontario, the band performed their album Fortress in its entirety for the first time. On November 26, 2009, they played in Halifax and on November 27 in Newfoundland, the only two eastern Canada tour dates for the year. Before the release of Scurrilous, Protest the Hero toured Europe in February as direct support for Darkest Hour (band). Born of Osiris and Purified in Blood were the other opening acts on the tour. Protest the Hero was the third band announced to be playing at Australia's Soundwave in February/March 2011, and in March and April of that year the band supported the Scurrilous album, headlining a tour across Canada and the United States with Maylene & The Sons Of Disaster and TesseracT.

=== Scurrilous (2010–2013) ===
On January 28, 2008, the band began a tour through Canada with A Day to Remember, Silverstein, The Devil Wears Prada, and illScarlett. In April they toured with Chiodos before joining Warped Tour 2008. They were on tour with The Acacia Strain, Whitechapel, and Gwen Stacy after Warped Tour in the United States; and then will be on a European tour with, Parkway Drive, Despised Icon, Architects, Whitechapel, and Carnifex. The band officially began recording of their third album on August 30, 2010. On December 15, 2010, Walker posted a video indicating the completion of work on the third album. Scurrilous was released March 22, 2011. Following the summer of 2011, where Protest the Hero played festivals across Europe, they embarked on a small Ontario tour in September with support from The Kindred (formerly known as Today I Caught the Plague). Protest the Hero then ended 2011 and kicked off 2012 with a tour across America with Scale the Summit and Last Chance to Reason. Protest the Hero continued their efforts to promote Scurrilous and have commenced a 2012 UK Tour that features support from German post-metal band, Long Distance Calling, Norwegian punk band Blood Command and Uneven Structure. They announced tours with Periphery, Today I Caught the Plague, Jeff Loomis (formerly of Nevermore), and The Safety Fire for the US. Another tour is scheduled with metalcore band Underoath, We Came as Romans, and Close Your Eyes commencing in May in South America. On August 27, 2013, the band announced a fall North American tour, along with Architects, The Kindred, and Affiance, promoting their album Volition commencing in Ottawa on November 7, 2013.

=== Volition and line-up changes (2013–2015) ===
On January 8, 2013, Protest the Hero released the following statement on their Facebook page in regards to their upcoming album in the summer of 2013: "We have some big announcements coming next week concerning our new album – which is a few songs away from being written. We plan on recording in March or April and have a new album out in the summer. We have been recording pre-production with our old friends Cam and Anthony. The material is more challenging than ever before and we know we'll have to work hard to bring it to life. Looking very forward to a bold 2013!"

On January 15, 2013, Protest the Hero announced that their fourth studio album would be crowdfunded through Indiegogo. The band claimed that they want to forgo record companies and that they have "finally decided to take matters into [their] own hands." The album had a fundraising goal of $125,000, a goal that was reached within 30 hours. By the end of their campaign, the band reached $341,146 in fundraising, nearly tripling their original goal.

On June 6, 2013, the band announced in an interview that original drummer and founding member Moe Carlson would part ways with Protest the Hero in order to pursue an education and career in tool and die manufacturing. Chris Adler of Lamb of God would be stepping in as his replacement for the recording sessions of the band's new album. On August 15, the official title and release date of the album were announced: Volition to be released on October 29, 2013. On October 10, 2013, Protest the Hero announced that Mike Ieradi, formerly of The Kindred, will be their new drummer. On the evening of March 30, 2014, during a show in Raleigh, North Carolina, Rody Walker confirmed that bassist Arif Mirabdolbaghi had left the band. On April 2, 2014, the band announced that Mirabdolbaghi had left the band to focus on other projects. The band's producer Cameron McLellan, who had also performed on several songs on Volition, was announced as the touring bassist and has since remained with the band as an unofficial member.

=== Pacific Myth (2015–2017) ===
On October 15, 2015, the band announced that their next release would not be a conventional album, but would instead be a subscription-based release of six tracks through the online music service Bandcamp. Each of the songs, including artwork, instrumental versions, and high-quality downloads, were released through Bandcamp once per month to paid subscribers until March 2016, forming an eventual EP entitled Pacific Myth. The first track, "Ragged Tooth," was released to subscribers on the same day.

In August 2015, it was announced that Protest the Hero would embark on a Canadian tour for the 10-year anniversary of their debut album Kezia, featuring the band's original line-up playing the album in its entirety. In January 2017, the band embarked on a North American tour as direct support for August Burns Red with In Hearts Wake and '68 (band). In September 2017, the band played a 5-show Canadian tour called And The Quest For More Treats... with support from Red Handed Denial, The Frame Defect, and Earth's Yellow Sun. On October 6, 2016, Protest the Hero released a limited run of Pacific Myth in its entirety on vinyl, allowing members of the subscription service to pre-order the EP. The EP was released to the public on November 18, 2016. The fourth track, Cataract, features guest vocals by a friend of the band and lead vocalist of Mandroid Echostar, Michael Ciccia.

=== Palimpsest (2017–2023) ===
On June 6, 2018, the band announced that they were forced to cancel their upcoming summer tour in Europe and Japan, and postpone the recording of their next studio album, due to Rody Walker developing "vocal issues" that might develop into "irreparable damage" if not taken care of.

A new single titled "The Canary" was released on April 16, 2020, on streaming sites. On the same day, the album's title, Palimpsest, along with the track listing and its release date set for June 19 was announced. Along with the 10 tracks that are listed for most editions, two bonus tracks called "Gift Horse" and "The Dueling Cavalier" exist that are included in a special vinyl bundle. The second single, "From the Sky", was released on May 14, 2020. The band modified the release date of the album from June 19 to June 18, 2020, in observance of Juneteenth, and the album was released to pre-order subscribers a day earlier on June 17, 2020.

In November 2021, Luke Hoskin announced his retirement from touring, although he remains a band member for songwriting and recording purposes. Ben Davis of The Kindred was announced as the band's new touring lead guitarist.

=== Within (2023-present) ===
On June 4th, the band confirmed a new album titled Within would be released on July 17, 2026. A single from the new album, "Mouthpiece" released on June 4th on all streaming platforms along with an accompanying music video on Youtube.

== Musical style ==
Protest the Hero incorporate complex instrumentation and have been categorized as progressive metal and progressive metalcore. They have also incorporated elements of mathcore, melodic hardcore, post-hardcore, thrash metal and skate punk, according to Loudwire. The publication stated that the band "pile different styles on top of each other depending on which era you’re examining." AllMusic stated that the band's sound was "reminiscent of a combination of Coheed & Cambria, At the Drive-In, and Every Time I Die."

== Awards ==
In 2004, the band won the Canadian Independent Music Award for Favourite Metal Artist/Group, beating out the better-known Alexisonfire. They were nominated for the 2006 Canadian Music Week Indie Awards' Favourite Metal Artist/Group, which Kataklysm won in March of that year. Also in 2006, the band was nominated for the CASBY Award. In addition, members of the band appeared in a televised commercial for the musical instrument store, Long & Mcquade. Bassist Arif was also featured in the Closet Monster music video "Mamma Anti-Facisto (Never Surrender)"; he can be seen to the left of London Spicoluk during the main group scenes.

The band has also released videos for the songs "The Divine Suicide of K.", "Blindfolds Aside", and "Heretics and Killers" from Kezia, and for "Bloodmeat", "Palms Read", "Spoils", "Sequoia Throne" and "Limb from Limb" from Fortress. The video for "Heretics and Killers" received airplay on MTV2 and FUSE, partially because of the interesting premise of the video: the band play the flying monkeys from The Wizard of Oz who work odd jobs after The Wicked Witch is killed. At the 2009 Golden God Awards, Protest the Hero won best Viral Video. The video features Rody, Luke, and Tim doing a dance on the side of a road when their van broke down.

The band won the 2014 Juno Award for Metal/Hard Music Album of the Year for the album Volition.

== Band members ==
Current members

- Rody Walker – lead vocals (2001–present)
- Tim MacMillar – rhythm guitar, piano, backing vocals (2001–present)

Current session musicians

- Luke Hoskin – lead guitar, piano, backing vocals (2021–present; 2001–2021 full-time member)
- Cam McLellan – bass, production (2013–2014, 2017–present, session; 2014–2015, 2015–2017, touring)
- Jadea Kelly – vocals (2004–2013; 2024-present)
- Milen Petzelt-Sorace – orchestration, arrangements, production (2022-present)

Current touring musicians

- Ben John Davis – lead guitar, backing vocals (2021–present)
- Matt Kidby – drums (2023–present)
- Mark Rynkun – bass (2023; 2026–present)

Former members

- Moe Carlson – drums (2001–2013; 2015, touring)
- Arif Mirabdolbaghi – bass, backing vocals (2001–2014; 2015, touring)
- Mike Ieradi – drums (2013–2022)

Former session and touring musicians

- Chris Adler – drums (2013)
- Eric Gonsalves – bass (2017–2021)
- Henry "Hank" Selva – bass (2021–2025)

== Discography ==
=== Studio albums ===
Year	Album details	Peak chart positions							Certifications (sales thresholds)
Year	Album details	CAN	JPN (Billboard)	JPN (Oricon)	US	US Ind	US Rock	US Hard Rock	Certifications (sales thresholds)
2005	Kezia: Released: August 30, 2005; Label: Underground Operations	—	—	250	—	—	—	—	
2008	Fortress: Released: January 29, 2008; Label: Vagrant Records	1	66	86	95	10	24	14	MC: Gold
2011	Scurrilous: Released: March 22, 2011; Label: Vagrant Records	8	—	106	81	12	20	4	
2013	Volition: Released: October 29, 2013; Label: Razor & Tie	7	—	—	20	1	7	3	
2020	Palimpsest: Released: June 18, 2020; Label: Spinefarm Records	3	—	—	—	—	—	—	
2026	Within: Released: July 17, 2026; Label: Independent	To be released							
"—" denotes a release that did not chart.

Opening for Alexisonfire, live in St. Catharines, January 2004

=== Extended plays ===
- 2-Track Demo (2002, Self-released as Happy Go Lucky)
- Search for the Truth (2002, Underground Operations)
- A Calculated Use of Sound (2003, Underground Operations)
- Sequoia Throne Remix EP (2008, Underground Operations)
- Pacific Myth (2015–2016, Independent, serial subscription released via Bandcamp)
- Fabula & Syuzhet (2020, Independent)

=== Live albums ===
Year	Album details	Peak chart positions	
Year	Album details	JPN DVD	US Ind
2009	Gallop Meets the Earth: Released: September 29, 2009; Label: Underground Operations	299	47

=== Compilation appearances ===
- (Coles) Notes from the Underground (2002) ("Break the Chain" and "Asperity of Sin")
- Greetings from the Underground (2004) ("Soft Targets Dig Softer Graves")
- Things Could Be Worse (2004) ("Break the Chain")
- Orange and Grey (2005, DVD) ("Silent Genocide," "These Colours Don't Run," "Red Stars Over the Battle of the Cowshed" and "Loathing In Laramie")
- The Power of Music (2005) ("An Apathetic New World")
- Warped Tour 2006 Compilation (2006) ("Heretics and Killers")

=== Music videos ===
Year	Song	Director
2004	"These Colours Don't Run"	Marc Ricciardelli
2005	"Blindfolds Aside"	Marc Ricciardelli
2006	"Heretics and Killers"	Marc Ricciardelli
2007	"The Divine Suicide of K"	Colin Minihan
2008	"Bloodmeat"	Marc Andre Debruyne
2008	"Sequoia Throne"	Marc Andre Debruyne
2008	"Palms Read"	Sean Michael Turrell
2009	"Spoils"	Sean Michael Turrell
2009	"Limb From Limb"	Marc Andre Debruyne
2011	"C'est la Vie"	Marc Andre Debruyne
2011	"Hair-Trigger"	Marc Ricciardelli
2013	"Clarity"	Kenneth Wilcox & Todd Hennessy
2013	"A Life Embossed"	
2013	"Underbite"	Marc Ricciardelli
2014	"Tilting Against Windmills"	
2014	"Mist"	Marc Ricciardelli
2020	“The Canary”	
2020	“From The Sky”	
2026	“Mouthpiece”	Troy Maher

=== Video game appearances ===
Song	Game	Year
"Divinity Within"	NHL 07	2006
"Bury The Hatchet"	Guitar Hero II (as DLC)	2007 (Note: Guitar Hero II was released in 2006, but the song was not released as DLC until 2007.)
"Goddess Gagged"	NHL 2K9	2008
"The Dissentience"	NHL 09	2008
"Heretics and Killers", "Bloodmeat", "No Stars Over Bethlehem", "Sequoia Throne"	Tap Tap Revenge 2	2008
"Bloodmeat"	Guitar Hero World Tour (as DLC)	2009 (Note: Guitar Hero World Tour was released in 2008, but the song was not released as DLC until 2009.)
"Limb From Limb"	Guitar Hero (iOS)	2010
