= Pacific Myth =

EP by Protest the Hero
- Released: November 18, 2016 (EP)
- Recorded: October 2015 – March 2016; Sunset Division Studios, Toronto, Canada and All Buttons in Studio, Ottawa, Canada
- Genre: Progressive metal
- Length: 35:13
- Labels: Independent; Razor & Tie (EP)
- Producer: Cameron McLellan

Protest the Hero chronology
Volition (2013)	Pacific Myth (2016)	Palimpsest (2020)

Pacific Myth is a subscription-based serial album and the fifth major release by the Canadian progressive metal band Protest the Hero, distributed through the online music subscription service Bandcamp. Following the independent release of their crowdfunded 2013 album Volition, the band sought to explore alternative release methods and decided upon a subscription-like platform wherein subscribers could get access to the scheduled arrival of a new song every month. Each of the songs, including artwork, lyrics, liner notes, instrumental versions, and high-quality downloads, were released through Bandcamp each month starting on October 15, 2015 with the first track, "Ragged Tooth," and ending on March 15, 2016 with the final track, "Caravan." The six songs effectively make up the band's fifth EP, and 11th overall release, released to the public on November 18, 2016. It is the band's first release with session member Cam McLellan on bass and full-time member Mike Ieradi on drums.

== Track listing ==
All lyrics are written by Rody Walker; all music is composed by Protest the Hero, strings on "Caravan" composed by Milen Petzelt-Sorace and Luke Hoskin.

No.	Title	Release date	Length
1.	"Ragged Tooth"	October 15, 2015	3:38
2.	"Tidal"	November 15, 2015	6:05
3.	"Cold Water"	December 15, 2015	5:44
4.	"Cataract"	January 15, 2016	5:00
5.	"Harbinger"	February 15, 2016	6:07
6.	"Caravan"	March 15, 2016	8:39
Total length:			35:13

== Personnel ==
=== Band members ===
- Rody Walker – vocals
- Tim MacMillar – guitar, piano
- Luke Hoskin — guitar
- Mike Ieradi – drums
- Cam McLellan — bass

=== Other personnel ===
- Michael Ciccia (of Mandroid Echostar) — guest vocals on "Cataract"
- Milen Petzelt-Sorace – strings on "Caravan"
- Cameron McLellan – engineering and production
- Dean Hadjichristou – percussion engineering
- Anthony Calabretta – mixing and mastering
- John Meloche – layout and direction
- Graham Curran – artwork for "Ragged Tooth," "Tidal," "Harbinger"
- Jeff Jordan – artwork for "Cold Water," "Cataract," "Caravan"

== Charts ==
Chart (2016)	Peak position
US Billboard 200	115
