= Jadea Kelly =

Canadian singer-songwriter

Jadea Kelly is a singer-songwriter from Whitby, Ontario, Canada.

== Career ==
Kelly's 2008 debut album, Second Spring, was produced by Ross Hayes Citrullo and received the "best country" award at the 2008 Toronto Independent Music Awards. At the end of 2009 Jadea began touring and performed shows with Ramblin Jack Elliot, Melissa McClelland, Luke Doucet, Ariana Gillis, Catherine MacLellan, Justin Rutledge and Jack Marks. In 2010, she released the album Eastbound Platform, which she recorded with producer David Baxter. Her third album, Clover, was released in 2013.

Kelly is also known for being a frequent collaborator of fellow Whitby musicians, and progressive metal act, Protest the Hero, providing several guest vocal appearances within the group's discography throughout their career, with her last to-date appearance on their 2026 sixth studio album Within.

At the 12th Canadian Folk Music Awards in 2016, Kelly won the award for Contemporary Singer of the Year for her album Love & Lust.

== Discography ==
=== Albums ===
- Second Spring (2008)
- Eastbound Platform (2010)
- Clover (2013)
- Love & Lust (2016)
- Roses (2022)
- Weather Girl (2024)

=== Singles and EPs ===
- It's Better To Be With You (2003)
- Down Wave (2006)
- Met While Incarcerated (2019)
