= List of SNFU band members =

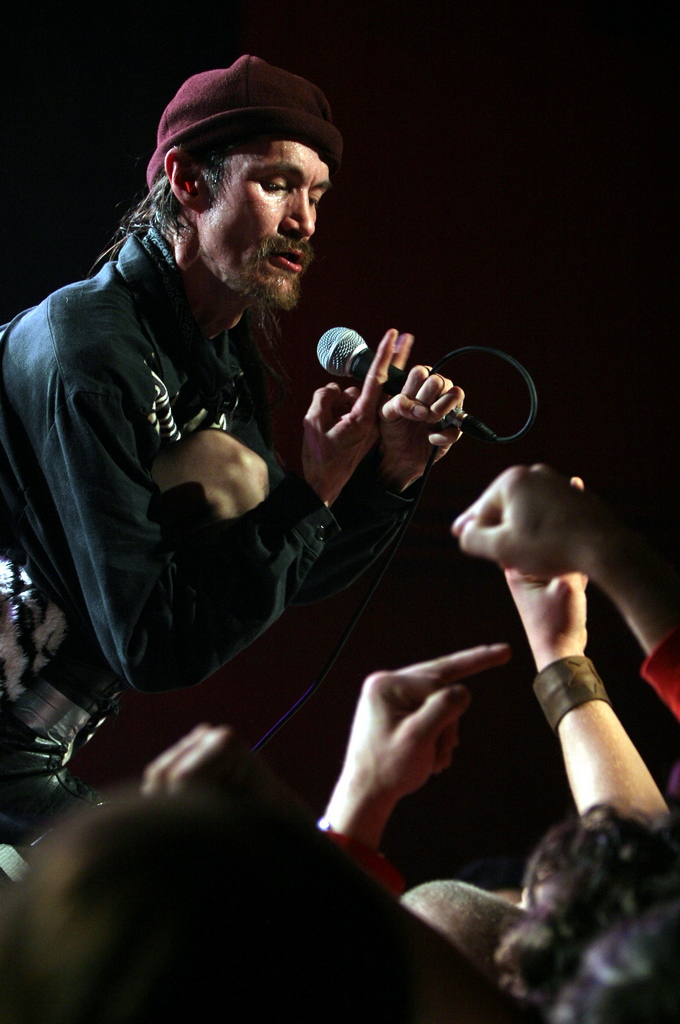
Vocalist Ken Chinn (Mr. Chi Pig) in Edmonton

SNFU was a Canadian punk rock group who formed in 1981 in Edmonton, relocated to Vancouver a decade later, became inactive in 2018, and briefly reunited in 2025. Thirty-four musicians played in the various lineups, counting seven guest members, with singer Ken Chinn (Mr. Chi Pig) remaining constant until his death in 2020. Among twenty-seven official members, these lineups included one singer, six guitarists, ten bassists (twice counting Ken Fleming, who served at different times as the band's bassist and guitarist), and eleven drummers. The lineups also included one guest singer, two guest bassists, and four guest drummers.

After Chinn, founding twin-brother guitarists Marc and Brent Belke served the longest tenures at 22 and 15 years, respectively (not counting the band's inactive time). Bassist Rob Johnson played with the group for nine years. Fleming and bassist Dave Bacon each spread two stints in the group over nearly eight years. The longest-standing consistent lineup lasted from late 1992 to early 1998 and featured Chinn, the Belkes, Johnson, and drummer Dave Rees. Chinn twice revamped the group's entire lineup, once each in 2007 and 2014.

== Member history ==
Vocalist Ken Chinn co-founded the band in Edmonton with Brent and Marc Belke, guitar-playing twin brothers who served as members of the group until 1998 and 2005, respectively. Between their 1981 formation and 1989 breakup, the band included four bassists (plus one guest) and three drummers. Bassist Warren Bidlock and drummer Evan C. Jones completed their initial lineup. After Bidlock's 1982 departure, Scott Juskiw filled in for their demo recording before Jimmy Schmitz joined. This incarnation continued into 1985, when Dave Bacon and Jon Card replaced Schmitz and Jones, respectively. Ted Simm spelled Card in 1986, while Curtis Creager replaced Bacon the following year.

For their 1991 reunion tour, Chinn and the Belke brothers reenlisted Creager and Card. When they moved to Vancouver and resumed full-time activity several months later, Ken Fleming replaced Creager, and Dave Rees replaced Card shortly thereafter. Rob Johnson began a nine-year tenure as the band's bassist late in 1992, which completed their best-selling and most prolific lineup.

Brent Belke and Rees both departed early in 1998; with drummer Sean Stubbs, SNFU became a four-piece band. Chris Thompson replaced Stubbs the following year, while Matt Warhurst replaced Johnson in 2001. The band went on hiatus shortly thereafter, however, with Thompson then departing. Chinn, Marc Belke, and Warhurst employed studio drummer Trevor MacGregor and finished recordings for a new record in 2003, and returned to activity later that year with new drummer Shane Smith. In 2005, they again disbanded.

Two years later, Chinn and Fleming (now playing guitar) began a new incarnation that would involve three bassists, three drummers (plus one guest), and one second guitarist. The new lineup was completed by bassist Bryan McCallum and drummer Chad Mareels, although McCallum was soon replaced by Denis Nowoselski. Smith returned as the group's drummer late in 2008, and Card replaced him two years later. In mid-2010, guitarist Sean Colig joined, completing their first five-member lineup in 12 years. Kerry Cyr replaced Nowoselski in 2012, and Junior Kittlitz spelled Card for touring in late 2013.

In February 2014, the band announced a new lineup based around Chinn, the returning Bacon, guitarists Kurt Robertson and Randy Steffes, and drummer Adrian White. Jamie Oliver replaced White in July (and guest drummer Txutxo Krueger filled in for three shows in August). Although the band planned to tour with Creager and Simm returning to the lineup in November, the tour was canceled, and Bacon and Oliver remained with the group. Basque drummer Batikão Est joined in 2016. The band announced a hiatus in March 2018, and Chinn died on 16 July 2020.

In December 2025, the Belkes played a four-song reunion set as SNFU with guest members Kristian Basaraba (vocals), Chuck Platt (bass), and Stephen Elliott (drums).

== Lineups ==
Period	Members	Releases
Late 1981–November 1982	Ken Chinn – vocals; Marc Belke – guitar, backing vocals; Brent Belke – guitar, backing vocals; Warren Bidlock – bass; Evan C. Jones – drums	
November 1982 Demo recording only	Ken Chinn – vocals; Marc Belke – guitar, backing vocals; Brent Belke – guitar, backing vocals; Evan C. Jones – drums; with: Scott Juskiw – guest studio bass	"Life of a Bag Lady" demo (1982)
Late 1982–May 1985	Ken Chinn – vocals; Marc Belke – guitar, backing vocals; Brent Belke – guitar, backing vocals; Jimmy Schmitz – bass; Evan C. Jones – drums	Three tracks on It Came From Inner Space compilation LP (1983); One track on Something to Believe In compilation LP (1984); ...And No One Else Wanted to Play (1985)
May 1985–June 1986	Ken Chinn – vocals; Marc Belke – guitar, backing vocals; Brent Belke – guitar, backing vocals; Dave Bacon – bass; Jon Card – drums, backing vocals	One track on It Came From the Pit compilation LP (1986); If You Swear, You'll Catch No Fish (1986); Demo track included on The Last of the Big Time Suspenders (1992)
July 1986–March 1987	Ken Chinn – vocals; Marc Belke – guitar, backing vocals; Brent Belke – guitar, backing vocals; Dave Bacon – bass; Ted Simm – drums, backing vocals	A-side of "She's Not on the Menu" 7" (1987); Two studio tracks included on The Last of the Big Time Suspenders (1992)
March 1987–September 1989	Ken Chinn – vocals; Marc Belke – guitar, backing vocals; Brent Belke – guitar, backing vocals; Curtis Creager – bass; Ted Simm – drums, backing vocals	Better Than a Stick in the Eye (1988); The Last of the Big Time Suspenders (1992)
Disbanded October 1989–September 1991
September 1991–January 1992 Wrong Trip Down Memory Lane reunion tour	Ken Chinn – vocals; Marc Belke – guitar, backing vocals; Brent Belke – guitar, backing vocals; Curtis Creager – bass; Jon Card – drums	...And Yet, Another Pair of Lost Suspenders (2019)
On hiatus February–June 1992
July–September 1992	Ken Chinn – vocals; Marc Belke – guitar, backing vocals; Brent Belke – guitar, backing vocals; Ken Fleming – bass; Jon Card – drums	
October–December 1992	Ken Chinn – vocals; Marc Belke – guitar, backing vocals; Brent Belke – guitar, backing vocals; Ken Fleming – bass; Dave Rees – drums	
December 1992–March 1998	Ken Chinn – vocals; Marc Belke – guitar, backing vocals; Brent Belke – guitar, backing vocals; Rob Johnson – bass, backing vocals; Dave Rees – drums	"Beautiful, Unlike You and I" 7" (1993); Something Green and Leafy This Way Comes (1993); The One Voted Most Likely to Succeed (1995); FYULABA (1996); Let's Get It Right the First Time (1998); One track on the We Are Not Devo compilation CD (1998); The Ping Pong EP (2000)
March 1998–August 1999	Ken Chinn – vocals; Marc Belke – guitar, backing vocals; Rob Johnson – bass, backing vocals; Sean Stubbs – drums	
August 1999–June 2001 (Note: Trevor MacGregor joined as guest studio drummer for sessions in 2000, including the two tracks on A Blessing but with It a Curse (2021) and tracks later included on In the Meantime and In-Between Time (2004) with Matt Warhurst replacing Johnson on bass.)	Ken Chinn – vocals; Marc Belke – guitar, backing vocals; Rob Johnson – bass, backing vocals; Chris Thompson – drums; with: Trevor MacGregor – guest studio drums (2000)	One track on Shot Spots: A Punk Rock Tribute to Trooper compilation CD (2002); Two tracks on A Blessing but with It a Curse EP (2021)
June 2001	Ken Chinn – vocals; Marc Belke – guitar, backing vocals; Matt Warhurst – bass, backing vocals; Chris Thompson – drums	Bonus track on In the Meantime and In-Between Time LP (2004); "A Happy Number" 7" (2017) (Note: Only Chinn and Marc Belke performed on "A Happy Number".)
On hiatus June 2001–mid-2003
Mid–late 2003 Studio sessions only	Ken Chinn – vocals; Marc Belke – guitar, backing vocals; Matt Warhurst – bass, backing vocals; with: Trevor MacGregor – guest studio drums	In the Meantime and In-Between Time (2004); Three tracks on A Blessing but with It a Curse EP (2021)
December 2003–September 2005	Ken Chinn – vocals; Marc Belke – guitar, backing vocals; Matt Warhurst – bass, backing vocals; Shane Smith – drums	
Disbanded September 2005–July 2007
July 2007–March 2008	Ken Chinn – vocals; Ken Fleming – guitar, backing vocals; Bryan McCallum – bass, backing vocals; Chad Mareels – drums, backing vocals	
March–December 2008	Ken Chinn – vocals; Ken Fleming – guitar, backing vocals; Denis Nowoselski – bass, backing vocals; Chad Mareels – drums, backing vocals	
December 2008–March 2010	Ken Chinn – vocals; Ken Fleming – guitar, backing vocals; Denis Nowoselski – bass, backing vocals; Shane Smith – drums	
March–June 2010	Ken Chinn – vocals; Ken Fleming – guitar, backing vocals; Denis Nowoselski – bass, backing vocals; Jon Card – drums	
June 2010–June 2012	Ken Chinn – vocals; Ken Fleming – guitar, backing vocals; Sean Colig – guitar, backing vocals; Denis Nowoselski – bass, backing vocals; Jon Card – drums	
June 2012–June 2013	Ken Chinn – vocals; Ken Fleming – guitar, backing vocals; Sean Colig – guitar, backing vocals; Kerry Cyr – bass; Jon Card – drums	Never Trouble Trouble Until Trouble Troubles You (2013); "I Wanna Be an East Indian" single (2014) (Note: Though credited to SNFU, this recording included only Chinn and other musicians.)
June–November 2013	Ken Chinn – vocals; Ken Fleming – guitar, backing vocals; Sean Colig – guitar, backing vocals; Kerry Cyr – bass; with: Junior Kittlitz – guest tour drums	
On hiatus November 2013–February 2014
February–July 2014	Ken Chinn – vocals; Randy Steffes – guitar; Kurt Robertson – guitar, backing vocals; Dave Bacon – bass, backing vocals; Adrian White – drums, backing vocals	
July 2014–April 2016 (Note: Touring was announced with the returning Curtis Creager (bass) and Ted Simm (drums) in late 2014, but this lineup did not appear.)	Ken Chinn – vocals; Randy Steffes – guitar; Kurt Robertson – guitar, backing vocals; Dave Bacon – bass, backing vocals; Jamie Oliver – drums, backing vocals; with: Txutxo Krueger – guest touring drums (three shows in August 2014)	
April 2016–March 2018	Ken Chinn – vocals; Randy Steffes – guitar; Kurt Robertson – guitar, backing vocals; Dave Bacon – bass, backing vocals; Batikão Est – drums, backing vocals; with: Jamie Oliver – studio drums (unfinished studio sessions, June–July 2016)	
Inactive March 2018–July 2020
Death of Ken Chinn, 16 July 2020
Disbanded 16 July 2020–November 2025
5 December 2025 One-off live set	Marc Belke – guitar, backing vocals; Brent Belke – guitar, backing vocals; Kristian Basaraba – guest vocals; Chuck Platt – guest bass; Stephen Elliott – guest drums	
