= The Ping Pong EP =

EP by SNFU
- Released: 2000
- Recorded: 1996
- Genre: Punk rock
- Length: 25:30
- Label: Alternative Tentacles
- Producer: SNFU

SNFU chronology
| Beautiful, Unlike You and I (1993) | ''The Ping Pong EP'' (2000) | A Happy Number (2017) |

The Ping Pong EP is an EP by Canadian punk rock band SNFU. Its tracks were taken from the 1996 recording sessions for the band's FYULABA album. It was released in 2000 on Alternative Tentacles.

== Background ==
In 2000, SNFU was searching for a recording contract after being dropped by Epitaph Records three years earlier. Their previous release had been the faux live album Let's Get It Right the First Time, and they had since undergone several lineup changes.

As a stopgap between full-length albums, the band issued five outtakes from their 1996 album FYULABA as The Ping Pong EP on Alternative Tentacles. The FYULABA sessions occurred at Mushroom Studios with engineer Pete Wonsiak and mixer Dave Ogilvie, the latter known for his work with Skinny Puppy. Former SNFU drummer Dave Rees, who played on the songs released on the EP, later expressed disappointment that these outtakes were issued as new material.

The EP's title came from the band's love of ping pong, in which later member Matt Warhurst joked the band was more interested than practicing.

== Reception ==
Professional ratings
Review scores
| Source | Rating |
|---|---|
| AllMusic | 3/5 stars |

The EP received positive reviews. Writing for AllMusic, critic Vincent Jeffries awarded the EP three out of five stars and described the band as "pound[ing] out light-speed skate punk as singer Mr. Chi Pig warbles, hoots, and hollers his bizarre lyrics." Jeffries concluded that the EP is "one of SNFU's stronger '90s releases." Writing for PopMatters, reviewer Andrew Johnson praised the EP for its contribution to SNFU's longevity, noting that the band is "still into playing at breakneck speed, making a lot of melodic noise and focusing more energy into one song than a lot bands manage to exert over an entire evening." Exclaim! reviewer Stuart Green gave the EP a favorable review, calling the tracks "what may be five of the best songs they've recorded in a decade."

== Track listing ==
All songs written by SNFU

| No. | Title | Length |
|---|---|---|
| 1. | "Questions, Questions, Questions?" | 2:29 |
| 2. | "I'm Your Carpet" | 2:45 |
| 3. | "Slavedriver" | 1:47 |
| 4. | "Zipperhead Club" | 3:45 |
| 5. | "Quentin Tarantino Can't Act" | 14:44 |

== Personnel ==
- Mr. Chi Pig (Ken Chinn) - vocals
- Marc "Muc" Belke - guitar
- Brent "Bunt" Belke - guitar
- Rob "Starbuck" Johnson - bass
- Dave Rees - drums
