= Something Green and Leafy This Way Comes =

Studio album by SNFU
- Released: November 1993
- Recorded: 1993
- Genre: Hardcore punk; skate punk; pop-punk
- Length: 42:57
- Label: Epitaph
- Producer: SNFU, Joe Peccerillo

SNFU chronology
The Last of the Big Time Suspenders (1991)	Something Green and Leafy This Way Comes (1993)	The One Voted Most Likely to Succeed (1995)

Something Green and Leafy This Way Comes is the fourth studio album by Canadian hardcore punk band SNFU. It was released in 1993 on Epitaph Records, the first of three SNFU releases on this label. Despite being released during the height of the third wave of punk rock by the revival's best-selling independent label and selling modestly well, the album was not commercially successful.

== Background and recording ==
After breaking up in 1989, SNFU reformed to embark upon the Wrong Way Down Memory Lane reunion tour late in 1991 to support their posthumous compilation album, The Last of the Big Time Suspenders, on Cargo Records. They had originally planned to disband again after the tour; but the concerts were successful beyond their expectations. SNFU met Bad Religion guitarist Brett Gurewitz at a show in Los Angeles, and Gurewitz expressed an interest in signing them to his independent label Epitaph Records. The band reformed after the tour with a new lineup, relocated from Edmonton to Vancouver, and signed with Epitaph early in 1993.

With new bassist Rob Johnson and new drummer Dave Rees, the band spent late 1992 and 1993 writing the material that would appear on Something Green and Leafy This Way Comes. The songwriting process was influenced in part by the direction that guitarists Marc and Brent Belke had taken in their new melodic rock band the Wheat Chiefs. SNFU demoed the material at Desolation Sound Studio in British Columbia, and two tracks from this session later appeared on their self-released "Beautiful, Unlike You and I" single. At Gurewitz's recommendation, they arranged to record their new album with producer Donnell Cameron, known for his work with Rocket From the Crypt, NOFX, Rancid, Bad Religion, and Pennywise.

The band traveled to Los Angeles to record with Cameron at Westbeach Recorders in August 1993. Very early in the recording sessions, Cameron checked into rehab for drug addiction, and the band opted to continue the sessions with Cameron's engineer Joe Peccerillo acting as producer. SNFU biographer Chris Walter notes their regret for continuing without Cameron and clashing with Peccerillo, who did not have a punk rock background.

The band experimented in the studio, taking advantage of Epitaph's comparatively large budget for the session. Rees and Peccerillo used tubular bells on the track "Seven Minutes Closer to Death", and the group utilized an expanded range of guitar tones throughout.

== Release ==
The album was released in November 1993. SNFU toured extensively behind the record, including stints with Bad Religion and Green Day in 1994 that yielded some of the largest shows in their career. They filmed a promotional video for "Reality Is a Ride on the Bus", their second music video and first in six years. The album sold modestly well, but SNFU's success was overshadowed by Epitaph label mates like The Offspring and Rancid, whose records went platinum.

The album was reissued as a vinyl LP in 2018 by Godbox Records in Barcelona.

== Reception ==
Professional ratings
Review scores
Source	Rating
AllMusic	2/5 stars

Something Green and Leafy This Way Comes received a mixed response from audiences and critics. Walter wrote that "fans did not immediately grasp the experimental tone of the album, and it would never get the props that it deserved." Jack Rabid from The Big Takeover called the album "average" while noting that it demonstrates that the band "can still rock hard and tight." Rabid ultimately assessed the release as "[a] good, solid punk/hardcore album for a time where there aren't that many of those." At the time of Chinn's death in July 2020, Exclaim! critic Gregory Adams praised the "booming, forlorn sensitivity" of the song "Painful Reminder" in particular. (Chinn also recorded a solo version of this song for his final release, the "Hurt" 7" credited to Mr. Chi Pig.)

Other reviewers were more critical. Writing for AllMusic, critic Vincent Jeffries describes the album as a "90-degree turn" from hardcore punk into pop punk, and states that "[i]t gets so bad on near-ballads like 'Joni Mitchell Tapes' that listeners might confuse one of punk's most revered bands with a run-of-the-mill '90s post-grunge knockoff." Jeffries ultimately assesses the record as "some of [SNFU's] least enjoyable material," awarding the record two out of five stars.

After Chinn's 2020 death, Winnipeg hardcore band Comeback Kid released a cover version of "Reality Is a Ride on the Bus" via Bandcamp in tribute. They donated proceeds to the Vancouver charity Ray-Cam Co-operative Centre.

== Track listing ==
All songs written by Ken Chinn, Marc Belke, Brent Belke, Rob Johnson and Dave Rees

No.	Title	Length
1.	"All Those Opposed"	2:52
2.	"Reality Is a Ride on the Bus"	3:07
3.	"Joni Mitchell Tapes"	3:38
4.	"A Bomb"	4:18
5.	"Tin Fish"	2:02
6.	"Painful Reminder"	4:07
7.	"Costume Trunk"	2:05
8.	"Gladly In Gloom"	1:59
9.	"This Is a Goodbye"	2:42
10.	"Strangely Strange"	2:02
11.	"X-Creep"	2:47
12.	"Trudging"	2:41
13.	"The Great Mind Eraser"	2:24
14.	"Limping Away"	2:28
15.	"Seven Minutes Closer to Death"	0:31
16.	"The Watering Hole"	3:05

== Personnel ==
SNFU

- Mr. Chi Pig (Ken Chinn) - vocals
- Marc "Muc" Belke - guitar
- Brent "Bunnt" Belke - guitar
- Rob "Da Buck" Johnson - bass
- Dave "Davey-Boy" Rees - drums

Guests

- O. - guitar (track 2)
- Joe Peccerrilo - tubular bells (track 15)
