= The Last of the Big Time Suspenders =

Compilation album by SNFU
- Released: 1991
- Recorded: 1986, 1988, 1989
- Genre: Hardcore punk
- Length: 31:22
- Label: Cargo Records
- Producer: SNFU, Cecil English

SNFU chronology
Better Than a Stick in the Eye (1988)	The Last of the Big Time Suspenders (1991)	Something Green and Leafy This Way Comes (1993)

The Last of the Big Time Suspenders is a compilation album by the Canadian hardcore punk band SNFU. The album is composed of live recordings, demos, compilation and EP tracks, and studio outtakes. It was released in 1991, two years after SNFU's first breakup, to satisfy the band's two-album contract with Cargo Records. The group reformed to tour behind the album, leading to a full reunion.

== Background ==
SNFU signed a two-record deal with the new Canadian imprint Cargo Records in 1988. After the release of Better Than a Stick in the Eye, their Cargo debut, the group disbanded due to exhaustion and disagreements. Members Brent Belke, Marc Belke, and Curtis Creager formed the new group the Wheat Chiefs. Singer Ken Chinn relocated from Edmonton to Vancouver and led the new bands The Wongs and Little Joe, while drummer Ted Simm returned to his home of Winnipeg.

In April 1991, Cargo owner Randy Boyd contacted Chinn about the second album that SNFU owed the label. Chinn suggested combining a recording of one of their final concerts, held at the Polish Hall in Edmonton in September 1989, with additional studio tracks culled from several sources. Cecil English, with whom the band had worked on Better Than a Stick in the Eye, was brought on to produce the compilation sessions. Chinn also drew the album cover art.

Tracks 1 through 7 are live tracks taken from the 1989 Polish Hall concert. Studio recordings of the songs "Cannibal Cafe" and "I'm Real Scared" first appeared on their 1985 debut album, ...And No One Else Wanted to Play. "Gimme Some Water" was written and originally recorded by Eddie Money. A studio recording of "Beautiful, Unlike You and I" was later released as a 7" single in 1993. Another version of "I Know More than You" was recorded in 1992 and released on the 2019 ...And Yet, Another Pair of Lost Suspenders live album. The remaining two live tracks are unique to this recording.

The remaining six tracks were taken from studio sessions. Track 8, "The Electric Chair", is a demo version of a song from the band's second album, If You Swear, You'll Catch No Fish, recorded at Technical Difficulties Studio in Edmonton in early 1986. Tracks 9 and 10 are taken from a 1986 studio recording session at Power Zone Studio in Edmonton. "Visiting the Bad Again" was originally featured on Thrasher Skate Rock 5: Born to Skate issued by Thrasher magazine in 1987. "She's Not on the Menu" is a re-arranged and re-recorded version of a song from ...And No One Else Wanted to Play that had previously been the A-side of an eponymous, self-released 7".

The album concludes with three outtakes from Better Than a Stick in the Eye, recorded in June 1988 with English at Profile Studios, Vancouver. "Wonder What They're Thinking" is a cover of a song originally by the Canadian punk band Personality Crisis. "Grunt, Groan, Rant and Rave!" is a re-recording of a song initially issued on the It Came From Inner Space compilation LP on Rubber Records in 1983.

== Release ==
The album was released in mid-1991. Promoter James Mclean approached Chinn in September with the possibility of booking an SNFU tour to support the new record. Chinn contacted guitarists Marc and Brent Belke, who agreed to the tour. They re-enlisted bassist Curtis Creager and drummer Jon Card, and booked a two-and-a-half-month tour beginning in late 1991 and ending in early 1992. The tour was successful, drawing the attention of Epitaph Records owner Brett Gurewitz who would later sign the band to a three-record deal. The band officially decided to reform later in 1992.

== Reception ==
Professional ratings
Review scores
Source	Rating
AllMusic	2.5/5 stars

The album was met with a mixed reception from audiences and critics. SNFU biographer Chris Walter notes that the live tracks are of poor quality, but nonetheless showcase the band in fine form. Writing a retrospective review for AllMusic, critic Vincent Jeffries awards the album two-and-a-half out of five stars and writes that "only the most serious of SNFU fans need to check out the slightly muddled live mixes and unspectacular B-sides" contained on the album.

== Track listing ==
All songs written by SNFU unless noted otherwise.

No.	Title	Writer(s)	Length
1.	"The Kitchen Kreeps"		3:20
2.	"Cannibal Cafe"	Ken Chinn, Marc Belke	2:16
3.	"Beautiful, Unlike You and I"		3:54
4.	"Gimme Some Water"	Eddie Money	3:46
5.	"I Know More Than You"		1:27
6.	"I'm Real Scared"	Brent Belke, M. Sinatra	2:20
7.	"I Used to Write Songs"		4:13
8.	"The Electric Chair"		2:38
9.	"Visiting the Bad Again"		2:28
10.	"She's Not on the Menu (Dunce Mix)"	Chinn, M. Belke	2:00
11.	"Appraise the Lord"		2:23
12.	"Wonder What They're Thinking"	Personality Crisis	1:56
13.	"Grunt, Groan, Rant and Rave!"		2:43

== Band members ==
- Mr. Chi Pig (Ken Chinn) – vocals
- Muc (Marc Belke) – guitar
- Brent (Brent Belke) – guitar
- Curt (Curtis Creager) – bass guitar (tracks 1–7, 11–13)
- Ted Simm – drums (track 1–7, 9–13)
- Dave Bacon – bass guitar (tracks 8–10)
- Jon Card – drums (track 8)
