= Better Than a Stick in the Eye =

Studio album by SNFU
- Released: December 1988
- Recorded: June–July 1988
- Genre: Hardcore punk
- Length: 31:11
- Label: Cargo Records
- Producers: SNFU, Cecil English

SNFU chronology
If You Swear, You'll Catch No Fish (1986)	Better Than a Stick in the Eye (1988)	The Last of the Big Time Suspenders (1991)

Better Than a Stick in the Eye is the third album by Canadian hardcore punk band SNFU. The album was released in 1988 by Cargo Records. It marked a return to a direct and unadorned sound following its comparatively experimental predecessor, If You Swear, You'll Catch No Fish. It would also be the group's last studio album for five years, as they disbanded months after the record's release before again reforming in 1991.

== Background and recording ==
SNFU released their first two albums on the American hardcore punk imprint BYO Records. They first worked with Cargo Records, a Canadian label recently established by their longtime acquaintance Randy Boyd, when Cargo helped distribute their 1986 self-released EP She's Not on the Menu. Impressed with the sales of the EP, Cargo signed SNFU to a two-record deal in 1988. For SNFU, this was a move to a larger label with greater distribution.

The group had wanted to work with producer Cecil English – whose recent work with NoMeansNo they particularly admired – since meeting him on tour in March 1987. They chose English's Profile Studios in Vancouver to record their third album, and began work in June 1988. They tracked the album live with minimal overdubs and few studio effects. Aside from an assault on guitarist Brent Belke while skateboarding en route to the recording studio, the sessions were uneventful and productive.

The album was the band's first full-length release with their new rhythm section, bassist Curtis Creager and drummer Ted Simm. Much of the material on the album had been written with former bassist Dave Bacon. The album's lead track, "Time To Buy a Futon", was co-written by Bacon and released in a previous version on Thrasher Skate Rock 5: Born to Skate, a compilation issued by Thrasher magazine. Three outtakes from the sessions were included on the 1991 compilation album The Last of the Big Time Suspenders.

== Release ==
The album was released in December 1988, while the band was on their first European tour. SNFU spent the next several months touring in support of the new album, but disbanded the following September due to exhaustion and disagreements among members.

== Reception ==
Professional ratings
Review scores
Source	Rating
AllMusic	4/5 stars

The record was generally received well and appreciated for its return to a rawer punk sound. In a retrospective review, AllMusic's Vincent Jefferies awarded the album four out of five stars and wrote that the album "captures the best hardcore qualities of SNFU with its diverse musical exchanges and imaginative accounts of the contrarian, ironic punk lifestyle." Writing for Noisey, Jason Schreurs called the record his longtime favorite SNFU album, although Schreurs admits that it was later eclipsed by their debut, ...And No One Else Wanted to Play.

== Track listing ==
All songs written by SNFU unless otherwise noted.

No.	Title	Writer(s)	Length
1.	"Time to Buy a Futon"		2:12
2.	"G.I. Joe Gets Angry with Human Kind"		1:44
3.	"The Quest for Fun"		2:13
4.	"Tears"		2:35
5.	"In the First Place"		3:29
6.	"Postman's Pet Peeve"		2:40
7.	"What Good Hollywood?"		2:05
8.	"The Happy Switch"		3:31
9.	"Straightening Out the Shelves (Of My Mind)"		2:53
10.	"Thee Maul That Heats Peephole"		2:22
11.	"Tour Tantrum"		1:46
12.	"Wild World"	Cat Stevens	3:38

== Band members ==
- Mr. Chi Pig (Ken Chinn) - vocals
- Muc (Marc Belke) - guitar
- Brent Bununsk (Brent Belke) - guitar
- Curt (Curtis Creager) - bass
- Ted Simm - drums
