= In the Meantime and In Between Time =

Studio album by SNFU
- Released: 2004
- Genre: Melodic hardcore
- Length: 38:49
- Label: Rake Records
- Producer: Marc Belke

SNFU chronology
Let's Get It Right the First Time (1998)	''In the Meantime and In Between Time'' (2004)	Never Trouble Trouble Until Trouble Troubles You (2013)

In the Meantime and In Between Time is the seventh studio album by Canadian hardcore punk band SNFU, released in 2004. The record was the band's first full-length studio album since FYULABA in 1996, and would be the last to feature founding guitarist Marc Belke. The band released the album on Belke's own Rake Records imprint.

== Background and recording ==
In 1998, SNFU suffered several blows when their contract with Epitaph Records expired and founding guitarist Brent Belke and longtime drummer Dave Rees both quit. Nevertheless, they began performing as a four-piece with new drummer Sean Stubbs and slowly amassed new material for a seventh studio album. Their first demo session for the new album came in early 1999 at Studio X in Vancouver, with Stubbs and bassist Rob Johnson completing the group alongside founding members Marc Belke and singer Ken Chinn.

In November 2000, the band returned to Mushroom Studios in Vancouver to record more material. They had previously recorded The One Voted Most Likely to Succeed and FYULABA at Mushroom, and now employed former sound man Simon Head to help in the studio. Although Chris Thompson had replaced Stubbs, drummer Trevor MacGregor of Treble Charger was employed as a studio member for the recording session. The band recorded "Cockatoo Quill", "Head Smashed In Buffalo Jump", "Hole In Your Soul", and the outtakes "The Awful Truth" and "Suddenly" during these sessions.

The band had been playing new songs, including "Cheap Transistor Radio" and "Head Smashed In Buffalo Jump", at concerts for a few years. In June 2001, the band performed its final show of this era at a punk tribute concert to Trooper. New bassist Matt Warhurst replaced Johnson, and Brent Belke returned for a guest appearance. Shortly thereafter, the band entered a hiatus, and Marc Belke relocated to Toronto. SNFU remained dormant for nearly two years.

With encouragement and funding from the band Model Citizen, Marc Belke recruited MacGregor, Warhurst, and producer Pete Wonsiak to continue work on the new record at Chemical Sound in Toronto in May 2003. Tracks recorded during this session include "Sick Lee and Coward Leigh", "A Wreck In Progress", "If I Die Will You Die?", "One Legged Bridge Jumper Breaks Good Leg In Plunge", "Der Heavy Head Dance", and the outtake "What Will It Take to Break You?".

Warhurst recorded further bass tracks at Lemon Leaf Studios in Vancouver. Later overdubs were recorded in Smoke & Mirrors Studios, Wonsiak's home studio in Vancouver. Brent Belke performed guest lead guitar on the track "Der Heavy Head Dance".

Ultimately, In the Meantime and In Between Time comprised material from the 2000 and 2003 sessions. Johnson's bass lines were removed from the former at his request and replaced with parts by Warhurst. The final mix of the album was done at The Warehouse, a studio owned by Canadian rock singer Bryan Adams.

== Release ==
The album was released on Marc Belke's Rake Records imprint in September 2004. The CD version contained 12 tracks, while the double LP included two additional tracks, covers of Devo's "Uncontrollable Urge", and the Circle Jerks' "Operation". The latter featured Chris Thompson on drums.

Towards the end of the recording sessions, the band had finalized a new live lineup based around Chinn, Marc Belke, Warhurst, and drummer Shane Smith. This lineup toured in support of the record in 2004 and 2005, before ultimately disbanding in late 2005. Chinn reformed the band two years later with several new lineups, with the band ultimately disbanding following Chinn's death in 2020.

The band posthumously released five remixed outtakes from both sessions on the A Blessing but with It a Curse EP in 2021.

== Reception ==
Professional ratings
Review scores
Source	Rating
Classic Rock	3/5 stars
Hour Community	5/5 stars
Punknews.org	3.5/5 stars

The album was well received by critics and fans. SNFU biographer Chris Walter describes audience reception of this "significant piece of work" as strong, in which listeners responded to the "strange and terrible beauty" and "stark brilliance" of the effort. Writing for Exclaim!, critic Stuart Green gave the album a favorable review and called it "maybe one of their best ever." Writing for Hour Community in Montreal, critic Jamie O'Meara awarded the album five out of five stars and praised the sound of the album as "huge." While Punknews.org critic Adam White worried that the material on the album was uneven, he ultimate argued that the "interesting tracks [...] outweigh the momentary sags."

The record also enjoyed modest success on various music charts. It reached number six on the Top Ten Metal/Punk chart on ChartAttack's radio charts for the week of December 10, 2004 and charted at various Canadian campus and community radio stations.

In 2017, the Canadian Broadcast Corporation's subset CBC Music ranked the song "Cockatoo Quill" among the top 20 most beloved songs by Canadian artists.

== Track listing ==
All songs written by SNFU unless otherwise noted.

No.	Title	Length
1.	"Cockatoo Quill"	2:46
2.	"I Think Fine Art's Fine"	2:16
3.	"Cheap Transistor Radio"	4:16
4.	"Head Smashed In Buffalo Jump"	3:20
5.	"One Legged Bridge Jumper Breaks Good Leg in Plunge"	3:14
6.	"A Hole in Your Soul"	2:59
7.	"Der Heavy Head Dance"	3:36
8.	"The Birdman of Malmo"	2:44
9.	"Sick Lee & Coward Leigh"	3:06
10.	"If I Die, Will You Die?"	2:51
11.	"A Wreck in Progress"	4:01
12.	"Elaine Elaine"	3:44

Vinyl bonus tracks

No.	Title	Writer(s)	Length
13.	"Uncontrollable Urge"	Mark Mothersbaugh	3:01
14.	"Operation"	Lucky Lehrer, Roger Rogersons	1:13

== Personnel ==
- Mr. Chi Pig (Ken Chinn) - vocals
- Marc Belke - guitar
- Matt Warhurst - bass
- Trevor MacGregor - drums
- Brent Belke - guitar (track 7)
- Corporal Ninny (Chris Thompson) - drums (track 14)
