= Let's Get It Right the First Time =

Live album by SNFU
- Released: 1998
- Genre: Hardcore punk
- Length: 54:55
- Producer: SNFU

SNFU chronology
| FYULABA (1996) | ''Let's Get It Right the First Time'' (1998) | In the Meantime and In Between Time (2004) |

Let's Get It Right the First Time is a live album by Vancouver, British Columbia hardcore punk band SNFU. The album was released in 1998. Although the record was billed as a live album and reportedly recorded at The Starfish Room in Vancouver in late 1997, SNFU biographer Chris Walter notes that the album was tracked almost entirely in the recording studio.

== Background and recording ==
SNFU's recording contract with Epitaph Records was due to expire in November 1997, and the band did not anticipate a renewal. Encouraged by Peter Karroll and John Zazula of Megaforce Records, they decided to cut a live album to have new material when their contract with Epitaph expired.

In October 1997, the group entered Bakerstreet Studios in Vancouver to record a faux live album. They interspersed stage banter and crowd noise from a show in The Starfish Room with an identical set list, while recording the instrumental tracks and vocals in the studio. Guitarist Brent Belke later noted that the band overdubbed sitar into the song "Reality Is a Ride on the Bus" "just to see if anyone was paying attention."

== Release ==
The album was released in mid 1998 by Megaforce. Shortly before its release, founding guitarist Brent Belke and longtime drummer Dave Rees quit. The band met Sean Stubbs, a former drummer in Bif Naked's band who was employed at Studio X and working on post-production for the album. Stubbs would go on to replace Rees and join SNFU for touring in support of the record. Karroll also briefly served as the group's manager before departing in 1998.

After its first pressing with Megaforce, the album was later re-released by the Three Days Dead label out of Caerphilly, Wales.

== Reception ==
Professional ratings
Review scores
| Source | Rating |
|---|---|
| AllMusic | 3/5 stars |

The album was received well by audiences and critics. Writing a retrospective review for AllMusic, critic Vincent Jeffries calls the album "less [of a] self-indulgent 'best-of' compilation" than a document that "captures the zealous insanity of SNFU in their element." Awarding the album three out of five stars, Jeffries concludes that the record is "a fitting monument to their well deserved longevity."

== Track listing ==
All songs written by SNFU unless otherwise noted.

| No. | Title | Writer(s) | Length |
|---|---|---|---|
| 1. | "Intro" | SNFU, Miller, Schlafer | 0:28 |
| 2. | "I Forget" | | 3:44 |
| 3. | "Better than Eddie Vedder" | | 2:41 |
| 4. | "Loser at Life/Loser at Death" | Chinn, M. Belke | 3:38 |
| 5. | "Don't Have the Cow" | | 2:44 |
| 6. | "Bobbit" | | 2:14 |
| 7. | "Fate" | | 2:51 |
| 8. | "Big Thumbs" | | 2:20 |
| 9. | "Painful Reminder" | | 4:02 |
| 10. | "Rusty Rake" | | 1:59 |
| 11. | "Eric's Had a Bad Day" | | 3:04 |
| 12. | "You Make Me Thick" | | 3:20 |
| 13. | "Drunk on a Bike" | | 3:49 |
| 14. | "Charlie Still Smirks" | | 3:25 |
| 15. | "Reality Is a Ride on the Bus" | | 3:13 |
| 16. | "The Gravedigger" | Chinn, M. Belke | 3:02 |
| 17. | "Cannibal Cafe" | Chinn, M. Belke | 2:28 |
| 18. | "Victims of the Womanizer" | | 2:42 |
| 19. | "The Watering Hole" | | 3:14 |

== Musicians ==
- Mr. Chi Pig (Ken Chinn) - vocals
- Marc Belke - guitar
- Brent "Bunnt" Belke - guitar
- Rob Johnson - bass
- Dave Rees - drums
