= The One Voted Most Likely to Succeed =

The One Voted Most Likely To Succeed

Studio album by SNFU
- Released: May 4, 1995
- Recorded: December 1994 – January 1995
- Genre: Hardcore punk
- Length: 29:35
- Label: Epitaph
- Producers: SNFU, Dave Ogilvie

SNFU chronology
Something Green and Leafy This Way Comes (1993)	The One Voted Most Likely To Succeed (1995)	FYULABA (1996)

The One Voted Most Likely to Succeed is the fifth studio album by Canadian hardcore punk band SNFU. The album was released in 1995 on Epitaph Records, their second of three albums for Epitaph. The band and label had high expectations for the album, which was released at the height of the third wave of punk rock. Ultimately the record did not chart as well as did contemporaneous albums by label mates such as the Offspring and Rancid, despite selling modestly well by punk rock standards. It nevertheless became a favorite among critics and fans.

== Background, recording, and release ==
SNFU signed a three-record deal with Epitaph in 1993. Something Green and Leafy This Way Comes, their experimental first release with the label, failed to chart and received only tepid reviews. They spent 1994 touring heavily with groups like Bad Religion and Green Day, including stints with road manager and future guitarist Randy Steffes, and planning a follow-up record.

The material for the new record was less experimental and more rooted in the band's earlier hardcore punk sound. The new songs included "Eric's Had a Bad Day," written for Vancouver journalist and Strain band member Eric Thorkelson, the bittersweet "A Better Place," and the cautionary "Drunk on a Bike".

SNFU entered Mushroom Studios in Vancouver to record their fifth studio album in late December. They spent two weeks recording the album with producer Dave Ogilvie, noted for his work with Skinny Puppy. Guests Mike "Gabby" Gaborno and Bif Naked, both longtime friends of the band, made guest vocal appearances on the album's final track, "One Last Loveshove". Mixing occurred in a studio owned by Canadian rock musician Bryan Adams and was completed by mid-January.

The band filmed promotional videos for the songs "Big Thumbs" and "Eric's Had a Bad Day" with director Eric Matthies. These songs also appeared as promotional singles. Epitaph released the album on May 4, 1995, while the band toured Europe.

== Reception ==
Professional ratings
Review scores
Source	Rating
AllMusic	3/5 stars
Punknews.org	4/5 stars

Critics generally received the album well. Writing a retrospective review for AllMusic, Vincent Jeffries called the album a "rewarding" effort in which "the group offers a more familiar [...] sound" than on their previous record. Jeffries adds that the skilled, and now veteran, punk musicians "handle the record's more difficult material with grace and power." Ultimately, Jeffries assesses the record as "one of their best '90s releases." CMJ's Juliana Day gave the album a positive review, calling the record "one adrenaline burst after another, prefabricated but easy to bang your head to." Punknews.org reviewer TomTrauma praised singer Ken Chinn's effort on the album. TomTrauma concluded that the album, "a classic by mid-'90s standards," "remains essential listening for fans of that era, and Canadian punk fans in general."

Calgary-based punk band Julius Sumner Miller later covered "Drunk on a Bike", recording it for their 2021 album Try It Out in the months after Chinn's death.

== Track listing ==
All songs written by SNFU

No.	Title	Length
1.	"Rusty Rake"	1:59
2.	"Better Place"	1:45
3.	"Big Thumbs"	2:21
4.	"Drunk on a Bike"	2:49
5.	"Manuel"	2:51
6.	"My Mold Collection"	2:19
7.	"Bumper Stickers"	1:27
8.	"Eric's Had a Bad Day"	3:11
9.	"King of Skin"	1:45
10.	"Mutated Dog"	2:55
11.	"Bizarre Novelties"	1:26
12.	"Lovely Little Frankenstein"	2:33
13.	"One Last Loveshove"	2:25

== Musicians ==
SNFU

- Mr. Chi Pig (Ken Chinn) - vocals
- Marc Belke - guitar
- Brent "Bunnt" Belke - guitar
- Rob Johnson - bass
- Dave Rees - drums

Guests

- Mike "Gabby" Gaborno and Bif Naked - vocals (track 13)
