= Redeemer (Wheat Chiefs album) =

Studio album by Wheat Chiefs
- Released: July 4, 1996
- Recorded: 1992, 1994
- Genre: Alternative rock
- Label: BangOn Records, Hom Wreckerds Music
- Producer: Marek Forysinski, Dave Ogilvie, Vinnie Gatti

Redeemer is an album by the Canadian punk-influenced alternative rock band the Wheat Chiefs. The album is a collection of songs from three separate recording sessions held between 1992 and 1994, and was released by BangOn Records, a subsidiary of the Canadian label Cargo Records, and the band's own Hom Wreckerds Music imprint. It is the only official release by the Wheat Chiefs.

== Background and recording ==
The Wheat Chiefs formed early in 1990 by guitarists and twin brothers Marc and Brent Belke after the demise of their previous band, SNFU. Their first recording session came that June, when they cut a demo tape at Technical Difficulties Studio in Edmonton. Two of these songs would later appear on Redeemer in re-recorded form.

Bassist Trenth Buhler and drummer Dave Rees quit the band in early 1992. With new bassist Rob Johnson and drummer Ed Dobek, the group recorded numerous tracks later that year with producer Marek Forysinski, including seven that would later appear on Redeemer. The band also recorded "Joe Murphy", a song about the Edmonton Oilers hockey player of the same name with producer Dave Ogilvie. In 1994, the band recorded "Everything" and "Redeem" with Rees returning as a guest drummer, producer Forysinski, and engineer Vince Gotti.

Despite receiving an offer from Mercury Records in 1993, the Wheat Chiefs had not signed a record deal. In 1996, they decided to release a selection of recordings as their debut album. Forysinski oversaw the final mixing process.

== Release ==
The band signed a distribution deal with Cargo Records, who had previously released two SNFU records. Redeemer was released in 1996.

The Wheat Chiefs filmed a promotional video for the song "Refuse". The video was directed by Mina Shum, a noted Canadian filmmaker and girlfriend of guitarist Brent Belke. The video was nominated for a Pacific Music Industry Association award and received modest airtime on MuchMusic.

== Reception ==
The album received little attention, but was received well by critics who reviewed it. SNFU biographer Chris Walter describes the album as packing a "solid wallop" and commercially viable despite not charting. In a positive review for Drop D magazine, critic Paul Watkin praised the album's melodicism and the Belke brothers' "cool guitar work." A writer for Discorder magazine lauded the album for its "singalong" appeal and likened the material to that of the Doughboys and Big Drill Car.

== Track listing ==
1. Refuse
2. Twist This Around
3. Theme Song
4. Joe Murphy
5. Redeem
6. Neighbors
7. Crawl
8. Hard 2 Love
9. Everything
10. Rock and Roll Makes Me Party On MTV and the Radio In the USA

== Credits ==
Personnel

- Marc Belke – vocals, guitar
- Brent Belke – guitar, vocals
- Rob Johnson – bass, vocals
- Ed Dobek – drums (tracks 1–3, 6–8, 10)
- Dave Rees – drums (tracks 4–5, 9)
- Marek Forysinski – Hammond organ (track 2)

Recording and production

- Tracks 1–3, 6–8, and 10 recorded by Marek Forysinski at Beta in Edmonton, Alberta, April 1992.
- Track 4 recorded by Dave Ogilvie at Desolation Sound in Vancouver, British Columbia, late 1992.
- Tracks 5 and 9 recorded by Vinnie Gatti at Fir Street in Vancouver, February 1994.
