= Beautiful, Unlike You and I =

EP by SNFU
- Released: 1993
- Recorded: 1993
- Genre: Punk rock
- Label: Hom Wreckerds Music
- Producer: SNFU

SNFU chronology
She's Not on the Menu (1987)	Beautiful, Unlike You and I (1993)	The Ping Pong EP (2000)

Beautiful, Unlike You and I is an EP by Vancouver punk rock band SNFU. It was recorded in 1993 while the band was recording demo material for their Something Green and Leafy This Way Comes album. It was released on the Hom Wreckerds Music label.

Side A is a re-recording of a song originally featured as a live track on their The Last of the Big Time Suspenders album. Side B is an alternate version of a song featured on Something Green and Leafy This Way Comes.

== Track listing ==
1. "Beautiful, Unlike You and I"
2. "The Watering Hole"

== Musicians ==
- Mr. Chi Pig (Ken Chinn) - vocals
- Marc Belke - guitar
- Brent Belke - guitar
- Rob Johnson - bass
- Dave Rees - drums
