= Curtis Creager =

American-Canadian bass guitarist

- Birth name: Curtis Creager
- Born: St. Petersburg, Florida, United States
- Genres: Punk rock, classic rock
- Instrument: Bass guitar
- Years active: 1987–present
- Labels: Cargo Records

Curtis Creager (born in St. Petersburg, Florida, United States) is an American-Canadian bass guitarist, best known as a former member of the punk rock band SNFU and alternative rock band the Wheat Chiefs.

== Career ==
Relocated to Edmonton, Alberta, Canada from St. Petersburg at age three, Creager began playing in punk bands while a student in high school. His first gigging group was Freddy Krueger's Right Hand, who were soon renamed Urban Holiday. He also befriended members of the influential skate punk band SNFU, becoming roommates with guitarist Marc Belke and serving as the inspiration for the song "Snapping Turtle" from their 1986 album If You Swear, You'll Catch No Fish.

He eventually joined SNFU in early 1987, becoming their fourth bassist after the departure of Dave Bacon. The band thereafter recorded their third LP, Better Than A Stick In The Eye, and toured extensively, including their first trip to Europe. The group disbanded late in 1989, however, due to exhaustion and musical differences.

Creager co-founded the post-SNFU group the Ship of Fools (soon renamed the Wheat Chiefs) with Marc and Brent Belke in 1990. His tenure with the Wheat Chiefs was brief, and he departed later that year. He next founded the band Deadbeat Backbone with members of Jr. Gone Wild. In 1991, he joined the Belke brothers, singer Ken Chinn, and former drummer Jon Card in reforming SNFU and embarking on a reunion tour behind the compilation album The Last Of The Big Time Suspenders. He opted against staying with the band thereafter as they relocated to Vancouver, British Columbia, signed to Epitaph Records and returned to a full-time workload.

Deadbeat Backbone remained active until 1994. Upon their breakup, Creager and several other members formed the new group King Lettuce, who disbanded in 1999. Creager co-founded the Montreal, Quebec-based classic rock band Durtloader in 2008. He later played in the blues rock band Road Runner.
