= FYULABA =

Album by SNFU

Studio album by SNFU
- Released: September 24, 1996
- Recorded: 1996
- Genre: Hardcore punk; skate punk
- Length: 33:20
- Label: Epitaph
- Producer: SNFU

SNFU chronology
The One Voted Most Likely To Succeed (1995)	FYULABA (1996)	Let's Get It Right the First Time (1998)

FYULABA is the sixth studio album by Canadian hardcore punk band SNFU. The album was released in 1996 by Epitaph Records. Its name is an acronym for Fuck You Up Like a Bad Accident. The album was the last of three albums released by SNFU on Epitaph. Eight years would pass before the proper followup, In the Meantime and In Between Time, was issued in 2004.

== Background and recording ==
Throughout 1995 and early 1996, SNFU had toured extensively in support of their fifth studio album, The One Voted Most Likely to Succeed. Members Marc Belke, Brent Belke, and Rob Johnson had also spent time finalizing the Redemeer album released in 1996 by their side project the Wheat Chiefs. SNFU initially recorded demos for their sixth album in May with roadie and sound man Simon Head.

In June 1996, the band returned to Mushroom Studios, the site of the recording of The One Voted Most Likely to Succeed, to record FYULABA. Engineer Pete Wonsiak and mixer Dave Ogilvie, the latter known for his work with Skinny Puppy, were brought on for the sessions. While the recording went generally smoothly, singer Ken Chinn's struggles with health and mental problems affected his productivity. Regardless, Marc Belke later remembered the sessions as personally satisfying and fulfilling. Singer Bif Naked made her second appearance on an SNFU record, singing backup vocals on "You Make Me Thick".

The band took the album's initial title, Fuck You Up Like a Bad Accident, from the American outsider artist and musician, Wesley Willis. The title was later shortened to its acronym form, FYULABA. The album's cover was designed by Brad Lambert, but the design used on the cover was an unfinished version of the intended cover. The band later expressed dissatisfaction with final art.

== Release ==
The album was released on September 24, 1996. The band shot a music video for the song "Fate", their fifth promotional video overall. Their tour in support of the record began in October 1996.

Included in the pregap of the CD release is an audio recording of a heated argument between the band's road crew and owners of a club in Kelowna, British Columbia on November 2, 1995. SNFU had played the venue that night, and Chinn and other associates of the band had had a negative encounter with one of the venue's bouncers, leading to further conflict.

== Reception ==
Professional ratings
Review scores
Source	Rating
AllMusic	2/5 stars

The album received mixed reviews from critics. Many praised the album's musicality but puzzled over Chinn's increasing interest in popular culture and tabloid headlines. A reviewer from The Onion's A.V. Club called the album a "veritable Entertainment Tonight of pop culture" that is nonetheless "dead-on musically". The A.V. Club reviewer described the band's sound as a hybrid between the Dead Kennedys and "Weird Al" Yankovic, and ultimately assessed FYULABA as "an enjoyable album." Similarly, AllMusic critic Vincent Jeffries praised the record's musicality in a retrospective review as "some of the fastest punk attempted by the band in years," but worried that "goofy lyrics prevent FYULABA from being a triumphant return to form." Jeffries also compared the band to "Weird Al" Yankovic and concluded that "[l]isteners willing to ignore the bad lyrics should get a charge out of the music, but this rather imposing condition should keep FYULABA off any must-have punk lists."

Other critics were more forgiving of the album's lyrics while praising its musicality. Writing for Drop-D Magazine, critic Paul Watkin gave the album a favorable review, describing it as "straight out, rapid fire punk, with the boys laying back into the crunchy guitars to highlight the choruses and screaming out back-up vocals." Watkin concludes that "FYULABA is good and sincere and has some things to say."

== Track listing ==
All songs written by SNFU. Track 1 is preceded by a recording hidden in the pregap.

No.	Title	Length
0.	"[hidden track; first 10 seconds blank]"	1:19
1.	"Stepstranger"	1:17
2.	"You Make Me Thick"	3:03
3.	"Bobbitt"	1:42
4.	"Better Than Eddie Vedder"	2:39
5.	"Don't Have the Cow"	2:40
6.	"Fate"	2:47
7.	"Dean Martian"	2:13
8.	"Charlie Still Smirks"	2:51
9.	"Spaceghost, The Twins and Blip"	1:53
10.	"My Pathetic Past"	2:36
11.	"Michelle Pfeiffer's Diaper"	1:31
12.	"The Kwellada Kid"	3:29
13.	"Elfie Schlegel"	2:05
14.	"Gaggle of Friends"	2:26

== Musicians ==
SNFU

- Mr. Chi Pig (Ken Chinn) - vocals
- Marc Belke - guitar, saxophone, vocals
- Brent Belke - guitar, vocals
- Rob Johnson - bass, vocals
- Dave Rees - drums

Guests

- Bif Naked - vocals (track 2)
- Simon Head - keyboards (track 3)

== See also ==
- List of albums with tracks hidden in the pregap
