= She's Not on the Menu =

EP by SNFU
- Released: 1986
- Recorded: 1986
- Genre: Punk rock
- Label: Self-released
- Producer: SNFU

SNFU chronology
She's Not on the Menu (1986)	Beautiful, Unlike You and I (1993)

She's Not on the Menu is an EP by Edmonton, Alberta-based punk rock band SNFU. It was self-released by the band in 1986. The EP contains a 1986 studio re-recording of a song from the band's debut album on Side A and two demo tracks originally recorded in 1982 on Side B.

== Background and release ==
SNFU planned to issue a new 7" record after their second album, If You Swear, You'll Catch No Fish, was delayed. For Side A, they recorded a reworked version (listed as a "dunce mix") of the EP's title track. The song had originally appeared on their debut album, ...And No One Else Wanted to Play.

The two tracks on Side B were taken from SNFU's first recording session, held in November 1982. They were recorded in the studios of CJSR-FM and originally had been intended for a compilation of underground Edmonton bands to be titled West Watch. The compilation was not released, and the songs were later used by SNFU as an informal cassette demo. The EP marked the first official release of the two tracks.

She's Not on the Menu was limited to 500 copies on colored vinyl, and was packaged with original artwork by singer Ken Chinn. The newly formed Cargo Records helped to distribute the record, and the success of its sales influenced Cargo to sign SNFU to a two-record contract. "She's Not on the Menu (dunce mix)" was reissued on the compilation album The Last of the Big Time Suspenders.

== Track listing ==
1. "She's Not on the Menu" (dunce mix)
2. "Life of a Bag Lady"
3. "This Is the End"

== Musicians ==
- Mr. Chi Pig (Ken Chinn) - vocals
- Marc Belke - guitar
- Brent Belke - guitar
- Dave Bacon - bass (track 1)
- Ted Simm - drums (track 1)
- Scott Juskiw - bass (tracks 2 & 3)
- Evan C. Jones - drums (tracks 2 & 3)
