= Shane Smith (drummer) =

Canadian drummer (born 1979)

- Born: January 22, 1979 (age 47); Armstrong, British Columbia, Canada
- Genres: Punk rock, alternative rock, industrial rock
- Instrument: Drums
- Years active: 2000–present
- Label: Rake Records

Shane Smith (born January 22, 1979, in Armstrong, British Columbia) is a Canadian drummer. He has performed with the punk rock bands SNFU and Slaveco., and the alternative industrial rock bands Neurosonic and Jakalope.

== Career ==
After playing in the high school band The Insubordinates in the 1990s, Smith joined the alternative rock band OCEAN3 in 2000, who went on to release several demos and marginal releases before disbanding the following year. OCEAN3 played several tours and shared a practice space with the influential skate punk band SNFU, and Smith co-founded the new group Based on a True Story with SNFU guitarist Marc Belke and OCEAN3 members Jay Black and Matt Warhurst after OCEAN3's breakup. Based on a True Story disbanded the following year after Belke relocated to Toronto, and Warhurst, Black and Smith formed the group Slaveco. with SNFU vocalist Ken Chinn in 2002.

Chinn, Belke, Warhurst and Smith began a new incarnation of SNFU in late 2003. The four toured behind their In the Meantime and In Between Time album prior to disbanding in 2005 due to in-fighting and general exhaustion.

Smith next joined producer Dave Ogilvie's Jakalope project in time to work on their Born 4 album. He also became involved with Neurosonic from 2006 to 2009.

Following this stint, he rejoined SNFU in early 2009, who had been reactivated two years earlier by Chinn and former bassist Ken Fleming. Smith remained with the group for a little over a year, departing in March 2010 after extensive touring and returning to Calgary to pursue a change in careers. He was replaced by early SNFU drummer Jon Card.
