= Belke =

Belke is a surname of German origin. Notable people with the surname include:

- Brent Belke (born 1965), Canadian guitarist and composer
- Marc Belke (born 1965), Canadian musician and radio personality
