= Never Trouble Trouble Until Trouble Troubles You =

Studio album by SNFU
- Released: November 2013
- Recorded: January–March 2013
- Genre: Melodic hardcore
- Length: 40:31
- Label: Cruzar Media
- Producer: SNFU & Steve Loree

SNFU chronology
In the Meantime and In Between Time (2004)	Never Trouble Trouble Until Trouble Troubles You (2013)	...And Yet, Another Pair of Lost Suspenders (2019)

Never Trouble Trouble Until Trouble Troubles You is the eighth and final studio album by Vancouver hardcore punk band SNFU. It was released in 2013 by Cruzar Media.

The record was released nine years after the band's previous album, In the Meantime and In Between Time. It was their only output recorded without co-founding guitarist Marc Belke, the sole release from the SNFU lineup led by singer Ken Chinn and guitarist Ken Fleming spanning 2007 to 2013, and the final studio album to feature Chinn before his death on July 16, 2020. It received mixed but generally positive reviews.

== Background and recording ==
In 2007, vocalist Ken Chinn reformed SNFU after a two-year disbandment, with former bassist Ken Fleming now playing guitar. This was the first SNFU lineup not to include founding guitarist and principal songwriter Marc Belke. They spent four years performing material from the band's previous eras.

SNFU's rhythm section had solidified around bassist Denis Nowoselski and drummer Jon Card by 2010, when second guitarist Sean Colig was also added. This lineup, however, was dealt several blows the following year. Chinn contracted a severe case of pneumonia, forcing them to cancel tour dates. Rehearsing further became complicated when Fleming emigrated to Japan and Nowoselski relocated to the Northwest Territories.

Despite these setbacks, the group remained active. Late in 2011, Fleming, Colig, and Card recorded a five-song demo in Adam Payne's studio in Vancouver. This was their first new material since reforming in 2007 and first studio recording since the In the Meantime and In Between Time album of 2004.

The band led the When Pigs Fly tour in 2012 in support of Chris Walter's SNFU biography, What No One Else Wanted to Say. Nowoselski departed and was replaced by Kerry Cyr for the tour's final two shows, and the band continued to circulate the unfinished demo among record executives. They received interest from Dan Lefrancois and his Cruzar Media imprint, who helped them complete the demo by arranging to have Chinn's vocal tracks added in July. Liking the demo and Fleming's additional new material, Cruzar agreed to release a new full-length album, which would be the band's eighth. Steve Loree, a former member of Deadbeat Backbone, Jr. Gone Wild, and Greyhound Tragedy, was enlisted to record and produce the album via his mobile studio Crabapple Downs.

Organizing the recording sessions proved to be logistically difficult due to Fleming's relocation and Chinn's chronic health problems. With minimal time to prepare, the band spent January 2013 rehearsing extensively and recording with Loree under an old bakery in East Vancouver. They played a 30th anniversary show in Vancouver on February 1 before Fleming returned to Japan. Chinn's vocals were recorded in the basement of the DV8 venue in Edmonton the following month, while Colig recorded the back-up and harmony vocals at Crabapple Downs in Nanton, Alberta. Along with Colig, Dylan Wolfspyder was an additional guest vocalist on the track "Crude Crude City."

== Release ==
The release of Never Trouble Trouble Until Trouble Troubles You was originally scheduled for May 2013, but it was delayed by several months. The band shot a music video for "Voodoo Doll Collector" with guitarist Tobias Chobotuck standing in for Fleming, who was unable to make the trip from Japan.

With Fleming, they toured Canada in July. Guest drummer Junior Kittlitz replaced the ailing Card when the band embarked on their first tour of Japan in September, and again toured Canada in October. The final performance from this era of the band came on October 31. This lineup featured Kittlitz, but not Fleming, who had returned to Japan.

Following numerous setbacks that delayed its release, the album was ultimately released in November. When the band finally toured behind the finished record in 2014, only Chinn remained from the lineup that had appeared on the recording. The lineups of SNFU that toured in support of the album and in the years that followed included Chinn, returning bassist Dave Bacon, guitarists Kurt Robertson and Randy Steffes, and several drummers. Due to Chinn's health, the band became inactive in 2018 and disbanded in July 2020 following Chinn's death.

== Reception ==
Professional ratings
Review scores
Source	Rating
Punknews.org	4/5 stars
Vue Weekly	2/5 stars

Despite inciting some controversy for the exclusion of founding member Belke, the album was generally received well by audiences and critics. Many praised the album for its authenticity, with SNFU biographer Chris Walter characterizing the record as "not some pale SNFU imitation but the real deal in almost every respect." Walter described the reviews of the album as "uniformly good." Punknews.org reviewer teacherman wrote that while "SNFU’s musicianship is strong, tight, and heavy on the riffs" and "[t]he guitar solos are harmonious," the "real treat [...] is Chi Pig’s longevity and the fact that he carries on with a desire to bear the punk rock torch into his 50s, in spite of numerous reported obstacles in his own life."

Nonetheless, some critics offered tepid reviews. Bryan Birtles of Edmonton's Vue Weekly gave the album two out of five stars and assessed it as merely "OK". Birtles described the album as "disconnected", and worried that Chinn's abilities had deteriorated.

== Track listing ==
No.	Title	Lyrics	Music	Length
1.	"Voodoo Doll Collector"	Ken Chinn	Ken Fleming	2:39
2.	"Buy My Own Hand"	Chinn	Fleming	3:35
3.	"Morley"	Chinn	Sean Colig	4:06
4.	"Arm in a Sling"	Chinn	Colig	2:16
5.	"Ashes"	Chinn	Fleming	4:08
6.	"Speed Weenie"	Jon Card	Card	3:01
7.	"New Rose"	Brian James	James	2:34
8.	"Donald the Dead"	Chinn	Colig, Fleming	3:58
9.	"Crude Crude City"	Card	Card, Colig	4:03
10.	"Fall Down Go Boom"	Chinn	Fleming, Colig	3:26
11.	"Un Low Hung"	Chinn	Fleming, Kerry Cyr	3:06
12.	"No Never"	Chinn	Colig	3:50

== Musicians ==
SNFU

- Mr. Chi Pig (Ken Chinn) - vocals
- Ken Fleming - guitar
- Sean Colig - guitar, vocals
- Kerry Cyr - bass
- Jon Card - drums

Guests

- Dylan Bastard, Wolfspyder - additional backup vocals (track 9)
