= ...And No One Else Wanted to Play =

...And No One Else Wanted To Play

Studio album by SNFU
- Released: 1985
- Recorded: December 1984
- Studio: Track Record Studios in Los Angeles, California
- Genre: Hardcore punk
- Length: 29:24
- Producer: SNFU and BYO

SNFU chronology
...And No One Else Wanted To Play (1985)	If You Swear, You'll Catch No Fish (1986)

Original cover

...And No One Else Wanted to Play is the first full-length album from Canadian punk band SNFU. The album was engineered by David Ferguson, recorded at Track Record Studios in Hollywood, California, US in December 1984, and released by BYO Records in 1985.

The album was well received at the time of its release, hailed in punk circuits as "[o]ne of the best Canadian releases in a long time." Thereafter it remained an influential hardcore punk record and helped establish the skate punk subgenre. Writing for AllMusic, critic Paul Henderson called the album "[a] must for devoted fans of the genre and a worthy introduction to early-'80s hardcore for the uninitiated."

== Background and recording ==
SNFU formed in November 1981, but recorded only demo and compilation material in their first three years together. They first became associated with BYO Records in July 1983 when they shared a short Canadian tour with Youth Brigade, the American punk band the members of which ran the label. BYO offered SNFU a spot on their forthcoming compilation album Something to Believe In, due for release in early 1984. SNFU recorded the song "Victims of the Womanizer" at Mid Ocean Studios in Winnipeg in November 1983 for the compilation. When the track received much positive attention, BYO signed SNFU to a record deal.

In December 1984, SNFU traveled from their home of Edmonton to Track Record Studios in the Hollywood neighborhood of Los Angeles, California to record what would become their debut album. The trip proved difficult. Travel from Canada to Los Angeles was fraught with complications, as both bassist Jimmy Schmitz and guitarist Marc Belke were denied entry at various points. The group eventually succeeded in crossing the border, however, and sessions began.

The American thrash metal band Slayer was working on their Hell Awaits album at Track Record while SNFU was recording, and the two bands shared the studio. Dave Ferguson engineered the sessions, and Shawn Stern of BYO and Youth Brigade acted as the unofficial producer. The production credit was later given to SNFU and BYO. The group also took several extended breaks from recording to perform concerts in Arizona and California, their first US shows.

While the songs that appear on the record were written between 1982 and 1984, much of the material was new at the time of recording. The new songs were faster and more aggressive than their previous material, and the songs represented a change in their musical direction. The title ...And No One Else Wanted to Play was taken from the chorus of the album's lead track, "Broken Toy".

== Release ==
The band played several Canadian shows in early 1985 prior to the promotional tour in support of ...And No One Else Wanted to Play. Drummer Evan C. "Tadpole" Jones had begun to suffer from exhaustion during the recording sessions, and he and Schmitz left the band after a show in late May. The new lineup assembled for the North American tour in support of the album included drummer Jon Card and bassist Dave Bacon.

The album was ultimately released in mid-1985, and the original version contained 14 tracks. Some later vinyl pressings and cassette issues of the album included a 15th track, a cover of Warren Zevon's "Poor Poor Pitiful Me". This track was recorded by Dave Mockford in 1985 while Card and Bacon were in the band, and was first issued on the It Came From the Pit compilation album.

== Artwork ==
The initial release of the 12-inch LP featured a copyrighted image by Diane Arbus entitled Child with Toy Hand Grenade in Central Park, NYC. (1962). As the band was not granted permission to use the image, they were forced to issue subsequent pressings with replacement cover art.

For the following pressing, the band had an artist draw the boy with the hand grenade in place of the photo. This effort was much too close to the original to be safe from potential lawsuits, so two further versions were created. Hastily assembled in time for the band's supporting tour, the first replacement cover featured a family sporting rifles. The final and widest-issued version (shown above) featured a Christmas massacre scene, which includes a thickly veiled allusion to the original Child with Toy Hand Grenade in Central Park.

A total of four different covers were used for various pressings of the album.

== Reception ==
Professional ratings
Review scores
Source	Rating
AllMusic	4/5 stars

SNFU biographer Chris Walter describes the early reviews of the album in underground punk sources as "uniformly good." In a review for Maximumrocknroll, noted artist Pushead praised the album's "[r]igorous energy pushing the limits of power with knocking flurry and extreme excitement" and called the album "a scorcher."

The album remained influential in hardcore punk circuits thereafter. Writing for AllMusic, Paul Henderson praised the band's mix of the "anger and rebellion" common to hardcore punk bands alongside its "wry sense of humor and warped but goofy subject matter" unique to the genre. Henderson awarded the album four out of five stars.

The album was also influential outside of the underground hardcore punk community. In February 2000, it ranked 56th on Chart Magazine's Top 100 Greatest Canadian Albums of All Time.

In 2022, the album was named the winner of the public vote for the Slaight Family Heritage Prize at the 2022 Polaris Music Prize.

== Track listing ==
All tracks are written by Ken Chinn and Marc Belke except where noted.

No.	Title	Writer(s)	Length
1.	"Broken Toy"		2:17
2.	"She's Not on the Menu"		1:29
3.	"Money Matters"	Chinn, Evan C. Jones	2:26
4.	"I'm Real Scared"	Brent Belke, M. Sinatra	1:59
5.	"Joyride"		1:34
6.	"Seein' Life Through the Bottom of a Bottle"		2:30
7.	"Cannibal Cafe"		2:14
8.	"Misfortune"	SNFU	2:49
9.	"Plastic Surgery Kept Her Beautiful"		1:24
10.	"The Gravedigger"		2:35
11.	"Bodies in the Wall"		1:31
12.	"Get off Your Ass"	Chinn, B. Belke, M. Belke	1:58
13.	"Loser at Life / Loser at Death"		2:20
14.	"This Is the End"	Chinn, B. Belke, M. Belke	2:18

Cassette and select vinyl pressings

Tracks 1–7 same as above

No.	Title	Writer(s)	Length
8.	"Poor Poor Pitiful Me"	Warren Zevon	3:45

Note

- Tracks 9–15 same as 8–14 above

== Personnel ==
- Mr. Chi Pig (Ken Chinn) – vocals
- Muc (Marc Belke) – guitar
- Brent (Brent Belke) – guitar
- Jimmy Schmitz – bass guitar
- Evan C. "Tadpole" Jones – drums
- Dave Bacon – bass ("Poor Poor Pitiful Me")
- Jon Card – drums ("Poor Poor Pitiful Me")
