= Matthew Warhurst =

Matthew Warhurst is the name of:

- Matty Warhurst, English footballer
- Matt Warhurst, Canadian musician
