= If You Swear, You'll Catch No Fish =

Studio album by SNFU
- Released: 1986
- Recorded: April 1986 at the Power Zone in Edmonton, Alberta, Canada
- Genre: Hardcore punk
- Length: 35:43
- Label: BYO
- Producer: Dave Mockford

SNFU chronology
...And No One Else Wanted to Play (1985)	If You Swear, You'll Catch No Fish (1986)	Better Than a Stick in the Eye (1988)

If You Swear, You'll Catch No Fish is the second full-length album by the Canadian hardcore punk band SNFU. It was recorded in April 1986 at Power Zone Studio in Edmonton, Alberta—although the album's liner notes claim the studio is located in Istanbul, Turkey—and was released on BYO Records in 1986. More diverse than their debut album, If You Swear, You'll Catch No Fish helped solidify SNFU's status in the North American hardcore punk community and influenced the formation of the skate punk subgenre.

== Background and recording ==
The lineup of SNFU appearing on If You Swear, You'll Catch No Fish formed in June 1985 for touring in support the band's debut album, ...And No One Else Wanted to Play. It was during this period that material from If You Swear, You'll Catch No Fish was first performed live, including early songs like "The Ceiling" and "Mind Like a Door". The group assembled the rest of the material over the next few months before recording in April 1986.

The band opted to record with Dave Mockford at Power Zone Studio in their home city of Edmonton, with whom they had twice previously recorded compilation material. They recorded basic tracks in a single day, and focused on overdubs and mixing thereafter. While many of the songs included the "blistering" hardcore punk sound of their debut, the album also included more experimental composition and recording techniques, including the use of sound effects, keyboard effects, and general "studio wizardry" by Mockford and the band members.

As with their debut, many songs featured music primarily written by guitarist Marc Belke and lyrics by vocalist Ken Chinn. But the new band members contributed material as well, such as bassist Dave Bacon's composition of "The Devil's Voice" and "Where's My Legs?", and drummer Jon Card's "Snapping Turtle". Card left the band during recording sessions to attend to familial commitments, though he would rejoin the band in 1991 for his second of three stints.

Chinn took the album's title from a fortune cookie. When he realized that each of the first two records inadvertently contained seven-word titles, he established the tradition of maintaining seven-word titles for all albums.

== Release ==
The album, their second with BYO Records, was initially slated to be released in September 1986. Card was replaced by Winnipeg drummer Ted Simm for the supporting tours, which would be largest upon which the band had embarked at that time. When the album's release date was delayed, they self-issued the She's Not on the Menu EP as a stopgap release.

The album was ultimately released late in 1986. Its cover features a sculpture by Edmonton artist Blake Senini and graphics by longtime SNFU associate Ken Hansen. The band filmed a music video for the track "Black Cloud" at the BYO warehouse early in 1987. This was SNFU's first music video, and would be their only video from the 1980s.

== Reception ==
Professional ratings
Review scores
Source	Rating
AllMusic	4/5 stars

The album has received generally positive reviews since its initial release. In 1986, Maximumrocknroll described the material on the album as "much stronger than the tunes on [the band's] debut L.P." In a retrospective review, critic Vincent Jeffries wrote for AllMusic that the record is "[c]onsidered by many to be the band's finest release" and that it "deservedly ranks high on many all-time punk lists." Jeffries awarded the album four out of five stars. But as SNFU biographer Chris Walter suggests, the album's thin and experimental sound also alienated some listeners, as the band itself would later express mixed feelings about the album's post-production mastering.

== Track listing ==
All songs written by SNFU.

No.	Title	Length
1.	"The Devil's Voice"	2:09
2.	"Where's My Legs?"	3:22
3.	"Better Homes and Gardens"	2:20
4.	"Scarecrow"	4:32
5.	"Black Cloud"	1:51
6.	"I Forget"	3:13
7.	"The Ceiling"	3:19
8.	"Mind Like a Door"	1:54
9.	"He's not Getting Older, He's Getting Bitter"	4:06
10.	"Electric Chair"	2:36
11.	"Welcome to My Humble Life of Disarray"	2:43
12.	"Snapping Turtle"	3:38

== Band members ==
- Mr. Chi Pig (Ken Chinn) – vocals
- Muc (Marc Belke) – guitar
- Brent Bunthoven (Brent Belke) – guitar
- Dave Bacon – bass guitar
- J. Seth Card (Jon Card) – drums
