= Sean Colig =

Canadian musician and record producer

- Born: May 21, 1976 (age 49); Toronto, Ontario, Canada
- Genres: Punk rock, heavy metal, hardcore, rap metal
- Instrument(s): Electric guitar, bass guitar
- Years active: 1993–present

Sean Colig (born May 21, 1976 in Toronto, Ontario) is a Canadian musician and record producer who has played guitar or bass in the bands Process, SNFU, Savannah, SideSixtySeven and Minority.

== Career ==
=== Early years (1993–2006) ===
Colig co-founded and played guitar with the Vancouver, British Columbia-based rap metal band Minority from 1993 to 1997. In 1996, the band took first place in Vancouver's 99.3 C-Fox Seeds radio contest amid 200 entries. This earned them local and nationwide popularity, and they went on to open for Pantera, White Zombie, Ice-T's Body Count, Sublime, Biohazard, Deftones, Korn, and numerous other group. During his stint with Minority, Colig also began working in record production.

In 1998 Colig next co-founded the skate punk band SideSixtySeven, with whom he played bass for eight years. Following his 2006 departure, the band remained active.

=== With Savannah and SNFU (2006–2013) ===
Colig joined the Vancouver and Edmonton-based heavy metal band Savannah in 2006, four years after their formation, replacing guitarist Ricco Forester. The group soon released their debut album The Road To.. with producer Devin Townsend, and continued extensive touring across North America.

Savannah toured with the influential punk rock band SNFU in 2010. During the tour, Colig often joined the group as a guest second guitarist and harmony vocalist. Soon thereafter, Colig became an official member of SNFU, completing their first five-piece lineup in 12 years. He and the group soon began their work on writing and recording sessions for their first studio release since 2004.

Colig contributed to SNFU's album Never Trouble Trouble Until Trouble Troubles You, released September 2013 worldwide on Cruzar Media Records. Colig composed several songs on the record, and his background harmony vocals complemented Ken Chinn's tracks throughout.

In December 2013 Colig and management decided for Colig's well-being and due to health matters, that Colig would take a leave of absence from the band to focus on his health.

On February 4, 2018 it was announced that Colig would be joining Process, replacing bassist Vincent Lee Borden. Colig departed from the band in December.
