= Wheat Chiefs =

Canadian rock band

- Also known as: Ship of Fools
- Origin: Edmonton, Alberta, Canada
- Genres: Rock, punk rock, pop-punk
- Years active: 1990–1998
- Labels: Hom Wreckerds Music, Cargo Records
- Past members: Marc Belke; Brent Belke; Curtis Creager; Dave Rees; Trent Buhler; Rob Johnson; Ed Dobek; Dan Moyse

The Wheat Chiefs were a Canadian rock band with punk rock influence formed in 1990 in Edmonton and later relocated to Vancouver. They included members of SNFU and one from Jr. Gone Wild. They released their only album, Redeemer, in 1996, before disbanding two years later.

== History ==
=== Early years (1990–1992) ===
Late in 1989, guitarists and twin brothers Marc and Brent Belke disbanded their influential skate punk band SNFU due to a rift with singer Ken Chinn and their desire to experiment musically. They formed The Ship of Fools with SNFU bassist Curtis Creager and longtime acquaintance Dave Rees on drums. With Marc Belke as lead vocalist, the band departed from SNFU's punk sound and played melodic alternative rock. After their initial performances, they renamed themselves the Wheat Chiefs. They later remembered their early songs as "kinda lengthy."

Bassist Trent Buhler, formerly of Rees's group Broken Smiles, replaced Creager early in 1990. The group recorded a demo cassette to pitch to industry representatives and embarked on Canadian tours. Their track "Redeem" was included on Thrasher Skate Rock Volume 10, issued by Thrasher magazine in 1991. The Belkes reformed SNFU in September 1991, and Rees and Buhler departed the Wheat Chiefs early in 1992 to form the new band Cowboy Dick.

=== New lineup (1992–1996) ===
Despite the reformation of SNFU, the Belkes kept the Wheat Chiefs active. Drummer Ed Dobek (of Jr. Gone Wild and the pre-SNFU band Live Sex Shows) and bassist Rob Johnson (a former Wheat Chiefs roadie and future SNFU member) completed the new lineup. This incarnation debuted with a short tour and recorded new tracks with producers Marek Forysinski and Dave Ogilvie. Brent Belke later remembered the new Wheat Chiefs material as "quicker and more straight ahead; it was great."

The band was active sporadically thereafter, with a major run of touring in 1993. They recorded the track "Joe Murphy" (named for the professional ice hockey player of the same name) with Ogilvie and returning guest drummer Rees, now a member of SNFU. It was included on the Puck Rock Volume 1 compilation of hockey-related punk rock songs assembled by John Wright of The Hanson Brothers and NoMeansNo. The Wheat Chiefs received a seven-figure recording contract offer from Mercury Records but rejected this in anticipation of a better deal, which they never received. Early in 1994, the group re-recorded two songs from their demo, again with Rees as a guest. Now signed to Epitaph Records, SNFU remained heavily active over the next two years while Wheat Chiefs activity lessened.

=== Redeemer and breakup (1996–1998) ===
After two years focused mainly on SNFU, Johnson and the Belkes returned to full-time Wheat Chiefs rehearsals early in 1996. Culled from three recording sessions in 1992 and 1994, the Redeemer album was released later this year through BangOn Records, a subsidiary of the Canadian Cargo Records. They promoted the album with tours of Canada and the United States, the largest in their career.

In 1997, drummer Dan Moyse replaced Dobek. The Wheat Chiefs continued to perform sporadically, but the members faced a blow when SNFU's Epitaph contract expired. The Wheat Chiefs disbanded following Brent Belke's departure from both bands to work in film and television music composition. They played a final gig on March 28, 1998, at a festival in Edmonton.

== Members ==
- Marc Belke – vocals, guitar (1990–1998)
- Brent Belke – guitar, vocals (1990–1998)
- Curtis Creager – bass (1990)
- Dave Rees – drums (1990–1992, 1994)
- Trent Buhler – bass, vocals (1990–1992)
- Rob Johnson – bass, vocals (1992–1998)
- Ed Dobek – drums (1992–1997)
- Dan Moyse – drums (1997–1998)

Timeline

== Discography ==
Albums

- Redeemer (1996, BangOn Records/Hom Wreckerds Music)

Demo cassettes

- Wheat Chiefs (1991, self-released)

Compilation appearances

- Thrasher Skate Rock Volume 10 (1991)
- Puck Rock Volume 1 (1993, Wrong Records)
- Edmonton Rocks Volume 1 (1997)
