= Matt Warhurst =

Canadian musician and record producer (born 1975)

- Born: June 28, 1975 (age 51); Sechelt, British Columbia, Canada
- Genres: Punk rock, alternative rock, industrial rock
- Instrument: Bass guitar
- Years active: 1995–present
- Label: Rake Records
- Formerly of: OCEAN3, SNFU, Based on a True Story, Slaveco., Jakalope, Artisan Kane

Matt Warhurst (born June 28, 1975 in Sechelt, British Columbia) is a Canadian musician and record producer. He has played bass guitar in the punk rock group SNFU and the industrial rock band Jakalope.

== Career ==
Warhurst began his career with the alternative rock band OCEAN3, who released several marginal releases and remained active for over a decade. In 2000, they began touring and sharing a practice space with fellow Vancouver, British Columbia band SNFU. In June 2001, Warhurst joined SNFU for a single gig, replacing long-time bassist Rob Johnson, but the band entered a hiatus shortly thereafter following the departure of drummer Chris Thompson. OCEAN3 also broke up around this time.

Along with OCEAN3 members Shane Smith and Jay Black, Warhurst joined SNFU guitarist Marc Belke in forming the new group Based on a True Story. The group was short-lived, however, as Belke relocated to Toronto in 2002. Smith, Black, and Warhurst then co-founded Slaveco. with SNFU singer Ken Chinn. Warhurst also began playing with Jakalope in 2002, later appearing on their It Dreams album.

In 2003, Belke and Chinn recruited Warhurst and drummer Trevor MacGregor to complete work on a new SNFU record, In the Meantime and In-Between Time. SNFU properly reformed after the completion of the record, with Warhurst and Smith completing the lineup and performing on their 2004 and 2005 tours. The group disbanded following this activity.

Warhurst has also produced records for the Canadian band the Invasives. He currently plays in the industrial band Artisan Kane.
