= Randy Steffes =

Canadian musician and manager

Randall Steffes
- Genres: Punk rock; Celtic punk
- Occupations: Musician; Manager
- Instruments: Guitar; Banjo; Mandolin
- Years active: 1985–present
- Labels: Fat Wreck Chords

Randall "Randy" Steffes is a Canadian musician and manager. As a musician, he has played with Bif Naked's early band Gorilla Gorilla and the skate punk band SNFU. He has also worked as manager, tour manager, guitar technician, sound engineer, and additional musician for Green Day, Good Riddance, and The Real McKenzies.

== Career ==
=== Gorilla Gorilla ===
Steffes grew up in Beausejour, Manitoba and attended the University of Manitoba. He was a member of Gorilla Gorilla, a fixture of the Winnipeg punk rock scene in the late 1980s. Singer Bif Naked, later a successful solo artist, fronted the band beginning in 1989.

Gorilla Gorilla relocated to Vancouver the following year. There they recorded a demo cassette tape with Cecil English and Craig Bougie (both noted for their work with NoMeansNo) and toured alongside The Wongs, a short-lived project featuring SNFU singer Ken Chinn. They disbanded in 1991.

=== Work in management ===
Steffes later began working for the punk rock band Green Day. He relocated to Berkeley, California while working with the band. Steffes initially had several positions with Green Day, including guitar technician.

Green Day experienced breakthrough success with their 1993 album Dookie. In October 1995, and on the eve of the release of the follow-up album Insomniac, the band cut ties with their previous management company and promoted Steffes to manager. The band cited their desire to be "self-managed" and employ a close member of their organization, rather than a traditional music executive.

In August 1996, Green Day replaced Steffes with manager Bob Cavallo, known for his work with such artists as Prince and Earth Wind & Fire. Steffes became the band's tour manager. Steffes also acted as tour manager and roadie for SNFU and Good Riddance around this time.

In 2007, Steffes began working with The Real McKenzies as tour manager and sound engineer. He played with the group as a guest member on several occasions, including the acoustic sessions yielding the Shine Not Burn live album in which he played banjo. He also played guitar on their 2012 album Westwinds. He worked with the group for six years before leaving his management capacity in 2013.

=== With SNFU ===
In 2014, Steffes joined SNFU as guitarist, composing a new lineup of the band alongside Chinn, bassist Dave Bacon, and former Real McKenzies guitarist Kurt Robertson. The reconstituted group toured in support of their new record, Never Trouble Trouble Until Trouble Troubles You.
