= Personality Crisis (band) =

Canadian punk rock band

- Also known as: Le Kille
- Origin: Winnipeg, Manitoba, Canada
- Genre: Punk rock
- Years active: 1979–1984
- Labels: Risky Records, Overground Records, War On Music, Sounds Escaping
- Past members: Mitch Funk; Walter Kot; Tommy Wharton; Ed Asselin; J. LePlume; Doug Bauer; Mark Halldorson; Richard Duguay; Jimmy Green; Duane 'Eddy' Froslev; Jon Card

Personality Crisis was a Canadian punk rock band formed in 1979 in Winnipeg. Originally named Le Kille, the band played a complex yet powerful form of 1980s punk. Their slim recorded output remains highly sought by collectors.

== History ==
The band was formed in 1979 as Le Kille by bassist Mitch Funk, who would remain the group's only consistent member, guitarists Tommy Wharton and Walter Kot, drummer Ed Asselin, singer Doug Bauer, and wind instrumentalist J. LePlume. Bauer, LePlume and Asselin departed the following year, moving Funk to lead vocals, while Wharton left in 1981. The arrival of drummer Mark Halldorson and bassist Richard Duguay coincided with the name change to Personality Crisis later that year. Following Kot's departure in 1982, the group began its final, longest-lasting lineup, including Funk, Duguay (now playing guitar), guitarist Jimmy Green, bassist Duane Eddie, and drummer Jon Card.

Personality Crisis released one LP, 1983's Creatures for Awhile [sic] on Risky Records, as well as several demo tapes. In 1989, Overground Records reissued the LP with a new cover and five new tracks replacing five from the original. The album was later reissued in its original form by War On Music. Overground Records also issued a posthumous 7" record, "Twilight's Last Gleaming", in 1990.

After the breakup of the band in 1984, Card went on to join SNFU, D.O.A. and later The Subhumans. Funk played in other bands, including Honest John, while Duguay later worked with Guns N' Roses, including contributing guitar tracks for "The Spaghetti Incident?", in addition to performing as a solo musician. Personality Crisis songs have been covered by SNFU and The Forbidden Dimension.

In 2008, GFY Press published Personality Crisis: Warm Beer and Wild Times, a biography of the band by author Chris Walter.

== Band members ==
- Mitch Funk – bass (1979–1980), vocals (1980–1984)
- Walter Kot – guitar (1979–1982)
- Tommy Wharton – lead guitar (1979–1981)
- Ed Asselin – drums (1979–1980)
- Doug Bauer – vocals (1979–1980)
- J. LePlume – wind instruments (1979)
- Mark Halldorson – drums (1980–1981)
- Richard Duguay – bass (1980–1981), guitar (1982–1984)
- Jimmy Green – lead guitar (1981–1984)
- Duane 'Eddy' Froslev – bass (1981–1984)
- Jon Card – drums (1981–1984)

== Discography ==
- Creatures for Awhile LP, Risky Records (1983)
- Creatures for Awhile reissue LP, Overground Records (1989)
- Twilight's Last Gleaming/The Jam 7", Overground Records (1990)
- Creatures for Awhile reissue LP, War On Music (2008)
- Personality Crisis 2CD, Sounds Escaping (2017)

Demo tapes

- "Burning Rain", "Sundays", "On The Sidewalk Bleeding" (1981)
- "Wonder What They're Thinking", "Waiting", "Shotgun", "Empty Sky", "Losing Time" (1981)

Compilations

- "Wonder What They're Thinking", "Waiting", "Shotgun" on Charred Remains compilation (1981)
- "Piss On You" on Something to Believe In compilation, BYO Records (1984)
- "Case History" on Rat Music for Rat People, Vol. 2, CD Presents (1984)
