= SNFU =

Canadian hardcore punk band

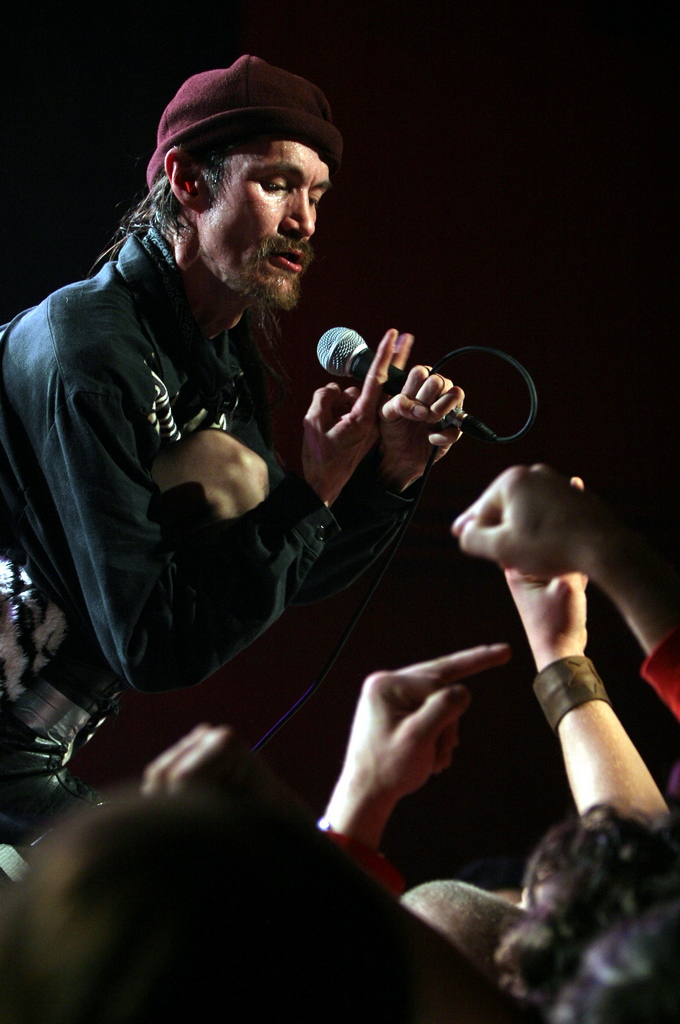
- SNFU vocalist Ken Chinn at the Starlite Room, Edmonton, Alberta

Background information
- Also known as: Society's No Fucking Use; Society's NFU; asSNFU
- Origin: Edmonton, Alberta, Canada
- Genres: Hardcore punk; skate punk
- Years active: 1981–1989; 1991–2005; 2007–2018; 2025
- Labels: BYO; Cargo; Epitaph; Alternative Tentacles; Rake; Cruzar Media
- Past members: (See below)

SNFU was a Canadian hardcore punk band from Edmonton, formed in 1981 as Society's No Fucking Use. They relocated to Vancouver in 1992 and went on hiatus in 2018. They released eight albums, two live records, and one compilation amid many lineup changes and several temporary breakups. Vocalist Ken Chinn (credited as Mr. Chi Pig) led the group, which included twin-brother guitarists Brent and Marc Belke for much of its career.

With founding drummer Evan C. Jones and early bassist Jimmy Schmitz, SNFU built an international audience and released their debut, ...And No One Else Wanted to Play (1985). They grew in popularity following the experimental If You Swear, You'll Catch No Fish (1986) with bassist Dave Bacon and drummer Jon Card, and the aggressive Better Than a Stick in the Eye (1988) with bassist Curtis Creager and drummer Ted Simm. They disbanded in 1989, however, due to internal tensions.

SNFU reformed in 1991, beginning with a reunion tour intended as a one-off. Drummer Dave Rees and bassist Rob Johnson ultimately completed their most lasting lineup. They signed with indie label Epitaph Records, releasing Something Green and Leafy This Way Comes (1993), The One Voted Most Likely to Succeed (1995), and FYULABA (1996). These achieved six-digit record sales as the band toured in support of Green Day and Bad Religion.

After leaving Epitaph, the band lost Brent Belke and Rees in 1998 and Johnson in 2001. Following a two-year hiatus, they self-released the critically praised In the Meantime and In Between Time (2004) with bassist Matt Warhurst and guest drummer Trevor MacGregor. They again disbanded in 2005.

Chinn and former member Ken Fleming reformed SNFU in 2007. With Card, guitarist Sean Colig, and bassist Kerry Cyr, they released Never Trouble Trouble Until Trouble Troubles You (2013). Beginning in 2014, the band included Chinn, Bacon, guitarists Randy Steffes and Kurt Robertson, and several drummers. They went on hiatus in March 2018, and Chinn died on July 16, 2020. The Belkes led a brief reunion in 2025.

SNFU became a formative influence on the skate punk subgenre. Rankings of the best Canadian music have included their work.

== History ==
=== Early years, ...And No One Else Wanted to Play (1981–1985) ===
Ken Chinn met twin brothers Brent and Marc Belke in Edmonton in the late 1970s. The three were teenagers who shared interests in the skateboarding subculture and burgeoning punk rock movement. They formed the punk band Live Sex Shows with drummer Ed Dobek and bassist Phil Larson in 1981, which broke up later that year after a few gigs.

Chinn and the Belkes began a new group, Society's No Fucking Use, shortened to Society's NFU. Bassist Warren Bidlock and drummer Evan C. Jones completed the initial lineup. After a few months of gigging, Bidlock departed due to stage fright. The group recorded a two-song demo cassette, "Life of a Bag Lady", with guest bassist Scott Juskiw.

Jimmy Schmitz replaced Bidlock late in 1982, and the group adopted the SNFU moniker. Two studio tracks on the It Came From Inner Space compilation LP on Rubber Records followed early in 1983 (songs re-released in 1990 on the Real Men Don't Watch Quincy bootleg 7-inch). SNFU built an audience throughout North America via their aggressive live set, support of touring acts such as Youth Brigade, the Dead Kennedys, Dayglo Abortions and GBH, and a track on BYO Records' Something to Believe In compilation LP.

They recorded their debut album, ...And No One Else Wanted to Play, in Los Angeles late in 1984, which BYO released the following year. The album made an impact in the underground punk scene, with noted artist Pushead writing in Maximumrocknroll that the band's "[r]igorous energy push[es] the limits of power with knocking flurry and extreme excitement." Pushead concluded that the album was "a scorcher."

=== If You Swear, You'll Catch No Fish and Better Than a Stick in the Eye (1985–1989) ===
Jones left the band due to exhaustion in mid 1985, and Schmitz departed in May. Dave Bacon joined as bassist, while Jon Card (previously of Personality Crisis, and later of D.O.A and the Subhumans) moved to Edmonton and joined as drummer. With the new lineup, the group toured North America. They released the comparatively experimental album If You Swear, You'll Catch No Fish in 1986 via BYO. Card left the band after the album's completion. With drummer Ted Simm, SNFU self-released the She's Not on the Menu 7-inch EP, which also included the "Life of a Bag Lady" recordings from 1982. Bacon departed in early 1987 due to musical differences and health concerns. Curtis Creager (of Urban Holiday), a former roommate of Chinn and Marc Belke, replaced him.

The band's popularity steadily increased. Flipside fanzine voted them Best Live Band in 1987 over the Red Hot Chili Peppers and Fugazi, while Metallica singer James Hetfield wore SNFU's iconic 'zombie' T-shirt in The $5.98 E.P. - Garage Days Re-Revisited insert. SNFU toured alongside Voivod and the Dayglo Abortions, and signed to Cargo Records. Cecil English produced their third record, Better Than a Stick in the Eye, which was issued in 1988 and remains influential among hardcore punk audiences. The supporting tour included their first trip to Europe.

Due to internal tensions and the Belkes' desire to experiment with playing other kinds of music, they disbanded in late 1989. Simm returned to Winnipeg, while the Belkes and Creager formed the Wheat Chiefs (which the Belkes would keep active until 1998). Chinn moved to Vancouver and led the short-lived groups The Wongs and Little Joe. Chinn also became open about his homosexuality, thereafter being an advocate for queer identity.

=== Reformation, Epitaph years (1991–1998) ===
To satisfy their contract with Cargo, in 1991 SNFU released The Last of the Big Time Suspenders, comprising live, demo, and studio-outtake tracks. The Belkes, Chinn, Creager, and Card reformed the band, initially planning only a supporting promotional tour. The tour was successful, however, and they reactivated the band several months later.

The Belkes joined Chinn, Card, and new bassist Ken Fleming (formerly of the Winnipeg-based skate punk band The Unwanted) in Vancouver in June 1992. Card, however, suffered from substance abuse problems, and Dave Rees (formerly of the Wheat Chiefs and SNFU tour mates Broken Smile) replaced him in October. This lineup completed an extensive European tour. The members dismissed Fleming late that year due to personality conflicts, and Wheat Chiefs bassist Rob Johnson joined.

In 1993, the band signed a three-record deal with Epitaph Records, an independent label on the cusp of mainstream success through The Offspring and Rancid. SNFU entered a period of heavy activity. They released two demos for their next album as the "Beautiful, Unlike You and I" EP on Hom Wreckerds Music. The album, Something Green and Leafy This Way Comes, appeared in 1993. Their music from this era was increasingly melodic, influenced by new directions in third-wave punk that they themselves had helped to develop. They toured with Green Day and Bad Religion and received opening support from Korn and Tool.

In 1995, SNFU released The One Voted Most Likely to Succeed. They hoped the record would sell comparably to other third-wave punk albums, but it did not chart. Nonetheless, critics acknowledge it as a "classic of '90s punk" in which the veteran musicians "handle the record's more difficult material with grace and power." The band released the Dave Ogilvie-produced follow-up FYULABA in 1996, which received mixed reviews.

Epitaph did not renew the band's contract after it expired late in 1997. As a stopgap, SNFU issued Let's Get It Right the First Time, a faux-live album co-released by Megaforce Records and their own Rake Records. In March 1998, Rees and Brent Belke both departed to pursue careers in film and television.

=== As four-piece, In the Meantime and In-Between Time (1998–2005) ===
Despite industry frustrations and lost members, Chinn, Johnson, and Marc Belke opted to continue. Drummer Sean Stubbs (of Numb, Jakalope, and Bif Naked's band) completed their first four-piece lineup. They continued to tour and began sporadic work on a new record, which would ultimately take six years. Chris Thompson (known as Corporal Ninny) replaced Stubbs in 1999. They released The Ping Pong EP, comprising five FYULABA outtakes, in 2000 via Alternative Tentacles. The band also recorded sessions with guest drummer Trevor MacGregor (of Treble Charger), later to appear on their seventh studio album.

In June 2001, Johnson left after a nine-year tenure. Matt Warhurst (of Ocean 3 and Jakalope) replaced him for a single gig, until Thompson departed and the band began a hiatus that would ultimately last two years. During the hiatus, Belke led Based On a True Story, also with Warhurst, before relocating to Toronto. Chinn formed Slaveco. with Warhurst and several musicians from Ocean 3 and Based On a True Story.

SNFU resumed in May 2003 with Marc Belke, Chinn, Warhurst, guest drummer MacGregor, and producer Pete Wonsiak completing the new record. Rake Records released the album, In the Meantime and In Between Time, the following year. Critics heralded it as a return to form, with some ranking it among their finest work. The song "Cockatoo Quill" placed among the top 20 most beloved Canadian songs in a 2017 CBC Music poll. Drummer Shane Smith (of Ocean 3, Based On a True Story, and Slaveco.) joined for touring in support of the album.

In August 2005, the group again disbanded due to industry frustrations and internal tensions. Belke began working in radio, hosting his own show. Chinn's severe drug abuse and health problems escalated, and he became homeless for a time before entering into assisted living.

=== Second reformation, Never Trouble Trouble Until Trouble Troubles You (2007–2013) ===
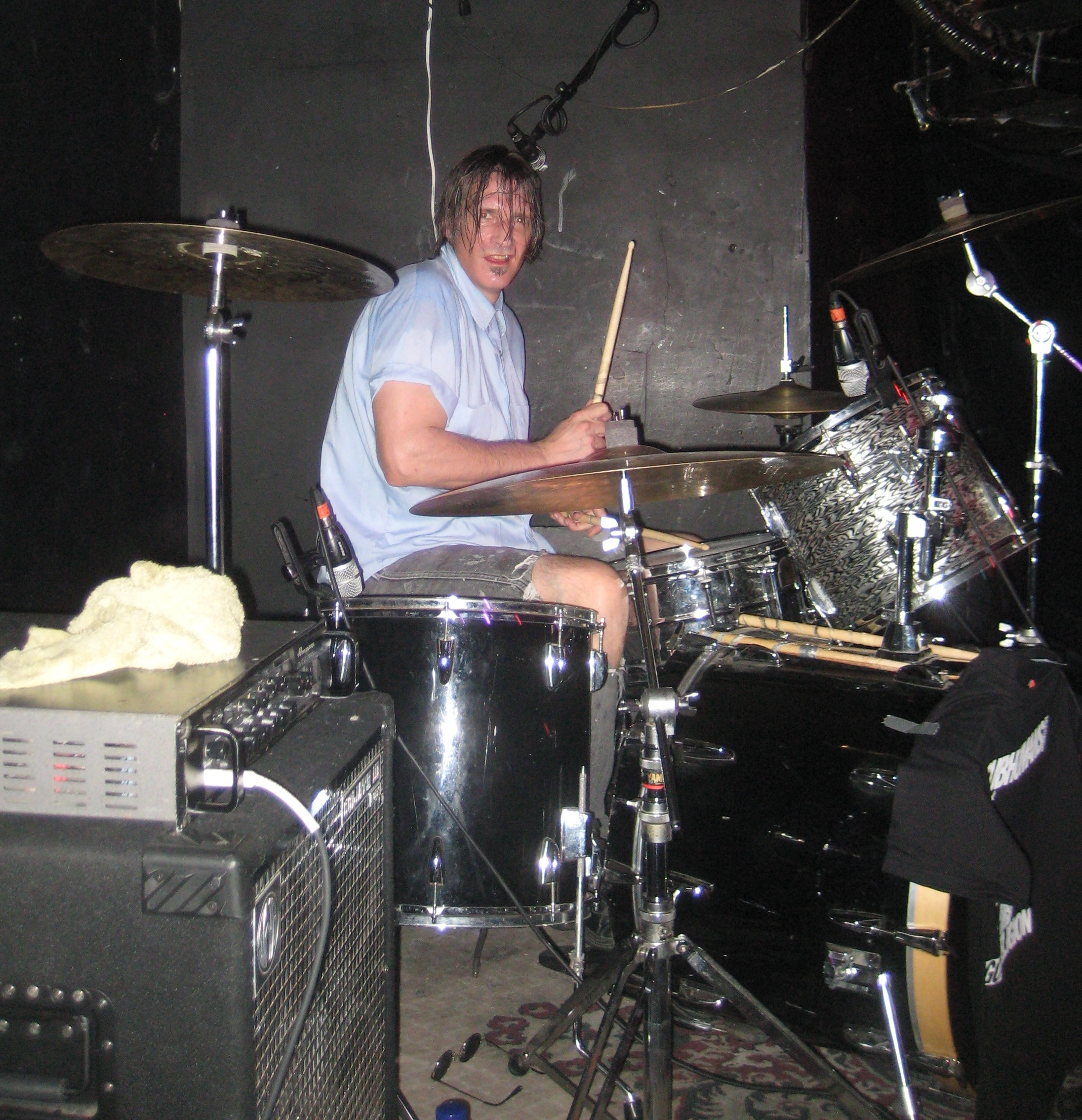
Veteran drummer Jon Card served three stints with the band.

In July 2007, Chinn and Fleming planned to play a set of SNFU songs as "asSNFU" at SNFU's 25th anniversary party. With Fleming on guitar, they recruited bassist Bryan McCallum (of Karen Foster) and drummer Chad Mareels (of Fleming's Dog Eat Dogma). asSNFU played a small handful of concerts thereafter before dropping the "as" prefix and billing themselves as simply "SNFU." The continuation in the absence of Belke caused minor controversy; but Chinn stated, "As far as I’m concerned it’s SNFU. The band has changed all throughout the years, and this is just another change. [...] Those songs are my life. I’ll fucking play them ‘til I die." Denis Nowoselski replaced McCallum in 2008, and Smith later returned to replace Mareels. The group embarked on their heaviest activity since the Epitaph years, which included Canadian and European tours.

Open Your Mouth and Say... Mr. Chi Pig, a documentary film about Chinn, debuted in March 2010. Produced by the Canadian company Prairie Coast Films and directed by Sean Patrick Shaul, it focused on Chinn, including his drug abuse and schizophrenia. It featured interviews with Jello Biafra of the Dead Kennedys, Brendan Canning of Broken Social Scene, Corb Lund of the Corb Lund and the Hurtin' Albertans and The Smalls, and Joey Keithley of D.O.A. In April, Jon Card joined the band for a third time, replacing Smith. Shortly thereafter, they completed their first five-piece lineup in 12 years by adding guitarist and vocalist Sean Colig (of Minority, Savannah, and SideSixtySeven).

Chinn's severe case of pneumonia led many 2011 dates to be canceled. The group nonetheless remained active, composing its first new material since reforming. Punk historian and author Chris Walter released an official biography of the band, What No One Else Wanted to Say, via GFY Press. Bassist Kerry Cyr (of SideSixtySeven) replaced Nowoselski in 2012. The cover song "I Wanna Be an East Indian" appeared under the SNFU moniker on Cruzar Media's Dayglo Abortions tribute album, but the track featured only Chinn and no further SNFU members.

Cruzar Media announced a September release for SNFU's eighth studio album, Never Trouble Trouble Until Trouble Troubles You, but delays followed. The band embarked upon its first tour of Japan and a subsequent Canadian tour, with guest drummer Junior Kittlitz replacing the ailing Card. Ultimately released in November, it was their first record in nine years and only without Marc Belke. It received mixed reviews from critics, some of whom praised the new lineup's successful approximation of the group's previous work. Others were critical, questioning Chinn's ability to continue performing. SNFU splintered late in 2013, as all members other than Chinn departed after the supporting tours.

=== Later Chinn-led lineups (2014–2018) ===
Between lineups, Cruzar issued "I Wanna Be an East Indian" as a download single. Chinn and returning bassist Bacon assembled a new incarnation in February 2014 with guitarists Kurt Robertson (of The Real McKenzies) and Randy Steffes (a former sound engineer and road manager for SNFU, The Real McKenzies, and Green Day), and drummer Adrian White (of Strapping Young Lad and Front Line Assembly). Beginning in April, the band played in Europe, Canada, and made their first United States appearances since 2001. They returned to Europe in July with British drummer Jamie Oliver (of the U.K. Subs). Guest drummer Txutxo Krueger (of Total Chaos) also filled in for several dates.

They planned further Canadian touring for November, which would include returning Creager and Simm, but ultimately canceled the tour. With Bacon and Oliver, their 2015 Canadian performances included ...And No One Else Wanted to Play in its entirety to commemorate its 30th anniversary. They also performed in Australia and New Zealand for the first time since 1997. Basque drummer Batikão Est (of Estricalla) began playing with the group in 2016, including Canadian and European touring.

Marc Belke reworked two demo tracks from 2000 and released them as SNFU's "A Happy Number" single on Rake Records in November 2017. The songs were far more experimental than anything else in the band's catalog and featured heavy use of electronic musical elements. Writing for PunkNews.org, reviewer Jefftommy called the "odd duck of a record" a "pretty little song by a hardcore band of yore" and recommended the record for the band's fans; Razorcake critic Ty Stranglehold praised the "hauntingly strange little ditties with keyboards and a drum machine" and the band's experimentation. The group's final live appearances with Chinn were in early 2018.

=== Hiatus, Chinn's death, and aftermath (2018–present) ===
The band planned further 2018 dates, but canceled these and announced a hiatus. Steffes and later Bacon joined the Real McKenzies. In June 2019, Artoffact Records released ...And Yet, Another Pair of Lost Suspenders, a live album recorded during the 1992 reunion tour at Les Foufounes Électriques in Montreal.

In November, Chinn revealed that he had a serious medical condition projected soon to become fatal. While ill, he recorded a solo 7-inch single with orchestral versions of "Hurt" (written by Nine Inch Nails and covered by Johnny Cash) and SNFU's "Painful Reminder." Chinn died on July 16, 2020, at age 57. SNFU released the acoustic track "Cement Mixer," Chinn's final recording, via YouTube shortly after his death.

Marc Belke and Rake Records released the EP A Blessing but with It a Curse in March 2021. The EP included outtakes from the In The Meantime and In Between Time sessions and guest appearances from members of Propagandhi. ...And No One Else Wanted to Play was named the winner of the public vote for the 2022 Polaris Music Prize's Slaight Family Heritage Prize. Original drummer Jones died on April 17, 2021, and Card died on April 8, 2024.

In December 2025, the Belke brothers oversaw a boxed set reissue of ...And No One Else Wanted to Play on Trust Records and curated an event at the Punk Rock Museum. The Belkes played four songs from ...And No One Else Wanted to Play with guests Chuck Platt (bass, of Good Riddance), Stephen Elliott (drums, of Dad Religion), and Kristian Basaraba (vocals, also of Dad Religion) in the museum's Pennywise Garage.

== Band members ==
- Ken Chinn (Mr. Chi Pig) – vocals (1981–1989, 1991–2005, 2007–2018; died 2020)
- Marc Belke (Muc) – guitar, backing vocals (1981–1989, 1991–2005, 2025)
- Brent Belke (Bunt) – guitar, backing vocals (1981–1989, 1991–1998, 2025)
- Evan C. Jones (Tadpole) – drums (1981–1985; died 2021)
- Warren Bidlock – bass (1981–1982)
- Jimmy Schmitz ('Roid) – bass (1982–1985)
- Dave Bacon – bass, backing vocals (1985–1987, 2014–2018)
- Jon Card – drums (1985–1986, 1991–1992, 2010–2013; died 2024)
- Ted Simm – drums, backing vocals (1986–1989)
- Curtis Creager (Curt) – bass (1987–1989, 1991–1992)
- Ken Fleming (Goony) – bass (1992); guitar, backing vocals (2007–2013)
- Dave Rees – drums (1992–1998)
- Rob Johnson (Starbuck) – bass, backing vocals (1992–2001)
- Sean Stubbs – drums (1998–1999)
- Chris Thompson (Corporal Ninny) – drums (1999–2001)
- Matt Warhurst – bass, backing vocals (2001, 2003–2005)
- Shane Smith – drums (2003–2005, 2008–2010)
- Chad Mareels – drums, backing vocals (2007–2008)
- Bryan McCallum – bass, backing vocals (2007–2008)
- Denis Nowoselski – bass, backing vocals (2008–2012)
- Sean Colig – guitar, backing vocals (2010–2013)
- Kerry Cyr – bass (2012–2013)
- Randy Steffes – guitar (2014–2018)
- Kurt Robertson (Dirty Kurt) – guitar, backing vocals (2014–2018)
- Adrian White – drums, backing vocals (2014)
- Jamie Oliver – drums, backing vocals (2014–2016)
- Batikão Est – drums, backing vocals (2016–2018)

Guests

- Scott Juskiw – studio bass (1982)
- Trevor MacGregor – studio drums (2000, 2003)
- Junior Kittlitz – tour drums (2013)
- Txutxo Krueger – tour drums (2014)
- Kristian Basaraba – guest vocals (2025)
- Chuck Platt – guest bass (2025)
- Stephen Elliott – guest drums (2025)

== Discography ==
Studio albums

- ...And No One Else Wanted to Play (1985)
- If You Swear, You'll Catch No Fish (1986)
- Better Than a Stick in the Eye (1988)
- Something Green and Leafy This Way Comes (1993)
- The One Voted Most Likely to Succeed (1995)
- FYULABA (1996)
- In the Meantime and In Between Time (2004)
- Never Trouble Trouble Until Trouble Troubles You (2013)

Live albums

- Let's Get It Right the First Time (1998)
- ...And Yet, Another Pair of Lost Suspenders (2019)

Compilations

- The Last of the Big Time Suspenders (1992)

Singles and EPs

- She's Not on the Menu 7-inch EP (1986)
- "Beautiful, Unlike You and I" 7-inch (1993)
- The Ping Pong EP (2000)
- "I Wanna Be an East Indian" digital single (2014)
- "A Happy Number" 7-inch (2017)
- A Blessing but with It a Curse (2021)

Compilation appearances

- It Came From Inner Space LP (1983)
- Something to Believe In LP (1984)
- It Came From the Pit LP (1986)
- Thrasher Skate Rock 5: Born to Skate cassette (1987)
- Johnny Hanson Presents: Puck Rock Vol. 1 CD (1993)
- Punk-O-Rama Vol. 2 CD (1996)
- We Are Not Devo CD (1998)
- Shot Spots: A Punk Rock Tribute to Trooper CD (2002)

Bootlegs

- Live '86 7-inch (1987)
- Real Men Don't Watch Quincy 7-inch (1990)
- Via Plastic Surgery (1998)
