= Kurt Robertson =

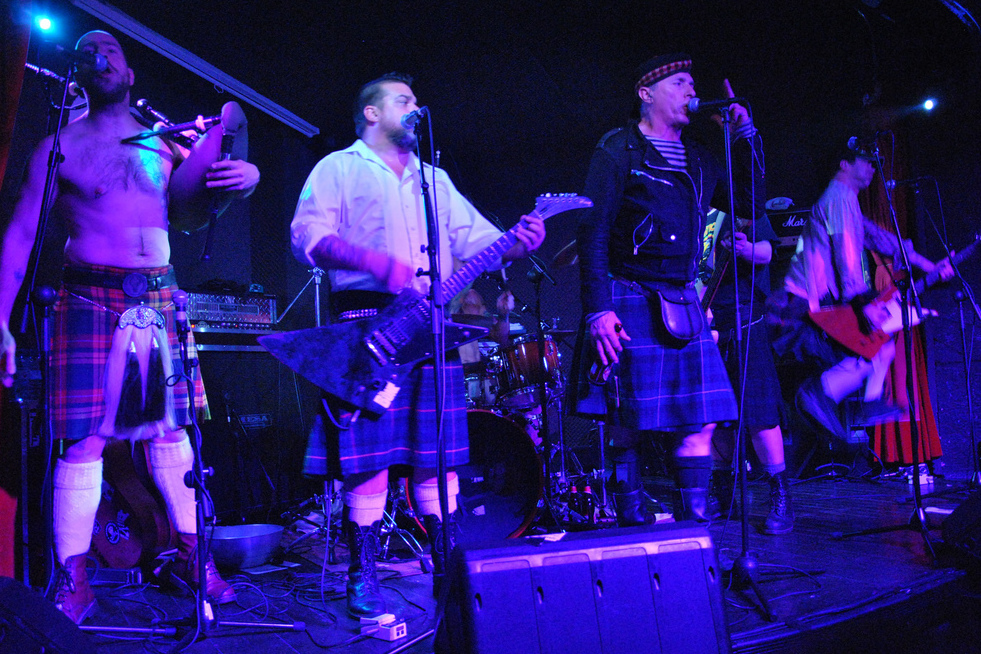
- The Real McKenzies onstage with Robertson (far right)

Background information
- Born: 21 July 1965; Vancouver, British Columbia, Canada
- Genres: Punk rock; Celtic punk
- Occupations: Musician; songwriter
- Instruments: Guitar; bass guitar
- Years active: 1985–present
- Labels: Fat Wreck Chords; Sudden Death Records; Nemesis Records

Kurt Robertson, also known as "Dirty Kurt" (born July 21, 1965 in Vancouver, British Columbia), is a Canadian punk rock guitarist and musician. Robertson was a member of Vancouver-based Celtic punk band The Real McKenzies from 1993 to 2013, appearing on their first seven full-length studio albums. In 2014, he joined the skate punk band SNFU.

== Biography ==
=== Early years and career ===
Robertson was born with a congenital heart problem and was adopted at birth. He grew up on Quadra Island before the early death of his adoptive parents. He then returned to Vancouver.

In Vancouver, Robertson played with the groups Curious George and Stick Monkey. Curious George released the album Children of a Common Mother in 1989 on the Nemesis Records imprint. Robertson later joined the band JP5, led by Gerry-Jenn Wilson. They also released one album, Hot Box.

=== With The Real McKenzies ===
In 1993, Robertson joined The Real McKenzies, initially as a guest member to replace guitarist Tony Walker for a single gig. Robertson stayed with the band, and remained in various capacities for 20 years. He performed with the group on their first three albums and through numerous tours.

Robertson took a hiatus from the band in 2005 when his girlfriend was pregnant with a child. He returned to the group in 2007 and appeared on their next four studio albums. He was only able to perform on select tours, however, due to his familial obligations and health problems. After suffering a heart attack and further complications from his condition, he left the band in 2013.

=== With SNFU ===
The following year, SNFU vocalist Ken Chinn assembled a new lineup of his recently splintered band to tour behind their latest album, Never Trouble Trouble Until Trouble Troubles You. Robertson was recruited, and joined the band for their subsequent tours.
