= Ken Fleming (musician) =

Canadian punk rock musician

- Also known as: Goony
- Born: October 23, 1962 (age 63); Winnipeg, Manitoba, Canada
- Genres: Punk rock, alternative rock
- Instruments: Guitar, bass guitar
- Years active: 1980–present
- Labels: Sudden Death Records, BYO Records

Ken Fleming (born October 23, 1962, in Winnipeg, Manitoba) is a Canadian punk rock musician. He has played in the early Canadian hardcore punk band The Unwanted, the skate punk band SNFU, and the industrial alternative rock band Econoline Crush.

== Career ==
Fleming began his career in 1980 with the Winnipeg-based band The Unwanted, an early staple of Canadian hardcore punk. With Fleming on bass, The Unwanted issued several releases, including the Shattered Silence LP issued on BYO Records in 1984. The band broke up the next year. They reformed decades later with singer Norm Simm and new musicians.

Following a move to Vancouver, Fleming played in several bands, including Grey Skies, with Devin Townshend. He served as SNFU's bassist in 1992, after the band reformed following a breakup. After embarking on Canadian and European tours, he left the band late that year.

Fleming worked with Econoline Crush, joining in 1997 for touring behind their The Devil You Know album. He later played in Twist, the long-running Dog Eat Dogma, and Ani Kyd's band. From late 2004 to early 2005, Fleming played bass in the Celtic punk band The Real McKenzies.

In 2007, Fleming and vocalist Ken Chinn reformed SNFU after a two-year breakup. They proceeded to tour extensively and release the album Never Trouble Trouble Until Trouble Troubles You. Fleming emigrated to Japan in 2011, and left SNFU in 2013. He has since played in Isolation 3 and PervCore.
