= Jon Card =

German-born Canadian drummer (1960–2024)

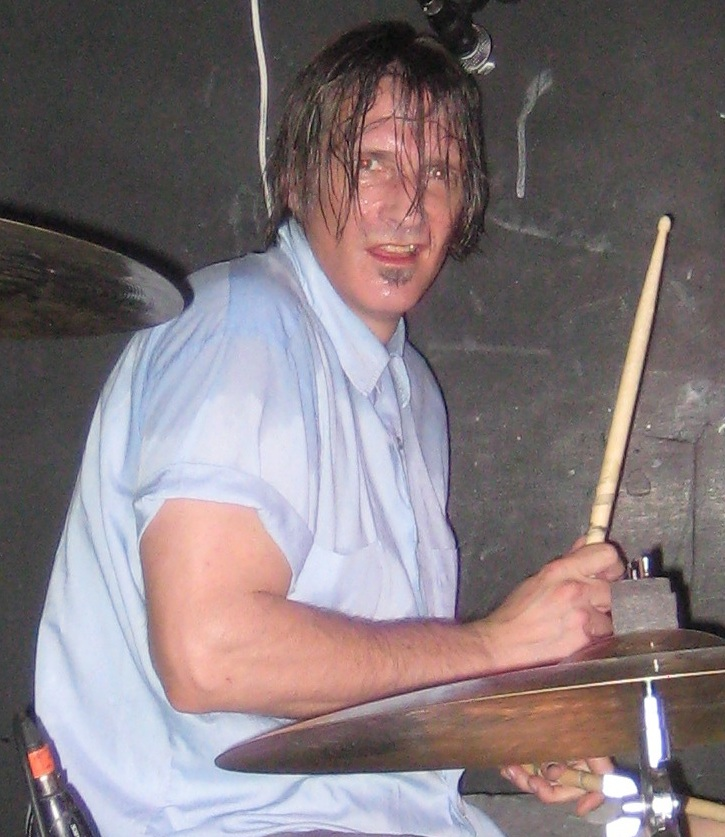
- Card playing drums for the Subhumans in 2010

Background information
- Also known as: Seth Hornblend
- Born: December 11, 1960; Zweibrücken, West Germany
- Died: April 8, 2024 (aged 63)
- Genres: Punk rock, alternative country
- Instrument: Drums
- Years active: 1980–2024

Jon Card (December 11, 1960 – April 8, 2024) was a German-born Canadian drummer. He played in the punk rock bands Personality Crisis, SNFU, D.O.A., and The Subhumans.

== Life and career ==
Card was born to a Royal Canadian Air Force pilot in Zweibrücken, Germany on December 11, 1960. He relocated to Canada at age four and grew up in Calgary, Alberta. After playing with heavy metal band Stonehenge, he formed his first punk band, Plasticide (later renamed Suburban Slag), in his late teens. In 1981, he joined Winnipeg band Personality Crisis, with whom he played for three years before their breakup.

He was a member of SNFU, who were then based in Edmonton, from 1985 to 1986. He played on their second LP, If You Swear, You'll Catch No Fish, and some songs on The Last of the Big Time Suspenders compilation album. In 1988, he contributed to Vancouver-based NoMeansNo's Small Parts Isolated and Destroyed as guest musician.

Card next joined D.O.A. for several years and records, departing in 1991. He thereafter joined the reunited SNFU for a 1991 tour, but did not stay with the band as they proceeded to sign with Epitaph Records.

Card played with alternative country artist Linda McRae on her 2002 album Cryin' Out Loud, and later in Ani Kyd's band. He joined the long-standing Canadian punk band The Subhumans for their 2005 reunion. They signed with the Alternative Tentacles and G7 Welcoming Committee record labels and released the New Dark Age Parade LP the next year. In 2010, Card also rejoined SNFU for his third stint with the band. He appeared on their Never Trouble Trouble Until Trouble Troubles You album three years later and departed before the subsequent tour.

Card died on April 8, 2024, at the age of 63.
