= Dave Rees =

American drummer

- Born: David Rees; June 15, 1969 (age 56)
- Origin: Seattle, Washington, United States
- Genres: Punk rock, alternative rock
- Instruments: Drums, percussion
- Years active: 1983–1998

David Rees (born June 15, 1969 in Seattle, Washington) is an American-Canadian musician and television editor currently based in Montreal, Quebec. Rees played drums in the punk rock band SNFU and the alternative rock band Wheat Chiefs, and served for a time as the touring drum tech for Bad Religion.

As an editor, he has worked on the television shows The L-Word, The Dead Zone and Whistler.

== Musical career ==
=== Early years (1983–1990) ===
As a teenager, Rees became involved in the punk rock scene in his hometown of Edmonton, Alberta, to which he had relocated from Seattle at age three. He joined the punk band Entirely Distorted, and the group gained notoriety after opening for the popular local skate punk band SNFU in 1985. Entirely Distorted remained active until 1987, when Rees and several other members formed the new group Broken Smile.

Broken Smile recorded an unreleased album in 1987 before relocating to Montreal, Quebec the following year. The move impeded the group's activity, however, and aside from a five-song demo, they failed to record any further material. After serving as a touring opening act for SNFU in 1989, Broken Smile became inactive. Rees and bandmate Brian Kassian joined the group My Dog Popper, playing on their Buenos Dias Jesus album. Rees also performed briefly as a guest backing musician for the notorious performer GG Allin during this era.

=== With the Wheat Chiefs, SNFU (1990–1998) ===
Early in 1990, Rees returned to Edmonton to join SNFU members Marc Belke, Brent Belke and Curtis Creager in a new project, then named The Ship of Fools, in the wake of SNFU's first breakup. The group soon renamed themselves The Wheat Chiefs and added former Broken Smiles bassist Trent Buhler after the departure of Creager. Rees played with the group for the next two years, but quit in 1992 after SNFU reformed and his bandmates' attention shifted. Rees, Buhler and Kassian formed the new group Cowboy Dick shortly thereafter.

Ten months later, Rees accepted an offer to relocate to Vancouver and joined the reformed SNFU after the departure of long-time drummer Jon Card. The move came on the eve of a large European tour. SNFU signed to Epitaph Records the following year, and thereafter enjoyed increasing success and popularity. They released three studio during this time, and toured extensively, including stints with Green Day and Bad Religion and concerts in four continents. Rees also acted as Bad Religion's touring drum tech for several tours between 1996 and 1998. He left SNFU and the music business in 1998 to pursue a career in the entertainment industry, which coincided with Brent Belke's departure for similar reasons.

== Career in television ==
Rees soon began working as editor for film and television. He has worked on episodes of The L-Word, Whistler, The Dead Zone, The Guard, and Andromeda.

In 2009, Rees became a partner in The Sound Research and the head of its The Sound Films division. Most recently, Rees was the director, producer, writer and editor for Dads, a television documentary produced by The Sound Films. It aired on the CBC on Father's Day 2013. He continues to work in the entertainment industry.
