= Ken Chinn =

Canadian musician (1962–2020)

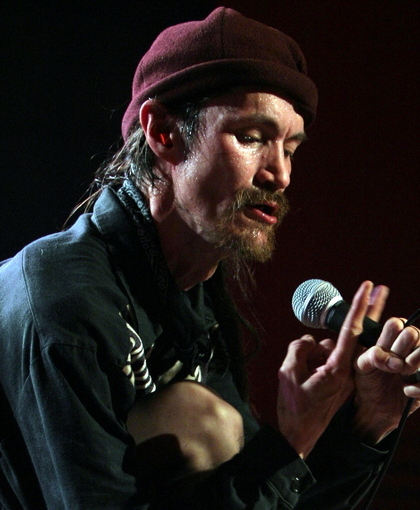
- Ken Chinn performing with SNFU at the Starlite Room in Edmonton, 2004

Background information
- Also known as: Mr. Chi Pig
- Born: Kendall Stephen Chinn; October 19, 1962; Edmonton, Alberta, Canada
- Died: July 16, 2020 (aged 57)
- Genre: Punk rock
- Instrument: Vocals
- Years active: 1981–2020

Kendall Steven Chinn (October 19, 1962 – July 16, 2020), known under the stage name Mr. Chi Pig, was a Canadian punk rock vocalist and artist born in Edmonton and long residing in Vancouver. He fronted the hardcore punk band SNFU from 1981 until their hiatus in 2018. Other, short-lived groups that he led included The Wongs, Little Joe, and Slaveco.

Chinn was an energetic vocalist, prolific artist, and sardonic lyricist. He was also an early advocate for queer identity in punk rock. His struggles with addiction and mental health problems were well documented, and he died of undisclosed health issues at age 57.

== Early life and career ==
Born to German and Chinese parents in Edmonton, Chinn was the second youngest of twelve children. His early life entailed traumatic episodes related to his unstable family, including manifestations of what would later be diagnosed as schizophrenia. Despite this, he remained close to his siblings and parents, who were important influences. As a teenager, he developed interests in punk rock, skateboarding, and art.

In 1981, Chinn formed the punk rock band Live Sex Shows with Marc and Brent Belke, twin brothers whom he had met through the skateboarding subculture. The group was short-lived, but the three musicians next formed Society's No Fucking Use, soon to be known by the acronym SNFU, late that year. SNFU rose in prominence in the Canadian hardcore punk community and ultimately became a formative influence for the skate punk subgenre, beginning with their 1985 debut ...And No One Else Wanted to Play. In addition to singing, Chinn wrote the group's lyrics and provided much of the artwork used on their records. He also served as an energetic and charismatic performer, incorporating masks, puppets, and other props into the band's stage show.

While touring behind their second LP, If You Swear, You'll Catch No Fish (1986), Chinn suffered a head injury that he later cited as a cause of his mental and physical decline. Though the band continued to find increasing success, they suffered from in-fighting, much centering around Chinn and the other members. After three LPs with a changing rhythm section and extensive touring in North America and Europe, SNFU disbanded in 1989 due to creative disagreements and general exhaustion.

== Move to Vancouver and height of commercial success ==
Chinn relocated to Vancouver in early 1990 and formed The Wongs. This band released a cassette and toured briefly with Gorilla Gorilla, a group then featuring Bif Naked and Randy Steffes, before disbanding the following year. Another short-lived group, Little Joe, followed soon thereafter, which was active sporadically for the next two years and recorded a demo in 1992. After moving to Vancouver, Chinn began what would become a long battle with hard drug addiction. This period also marked the beginning of Chinn's open identification as a homosexual.

In late 1991, SNFU reformed for a reunion tour behind The Last of the Big Time Suspenders, a rarities compilation released to satisfy their contract with Cargo Records. The tour was successful, and the reinvigorated band properly reunited, signing to Epitaph Records in 1993. Their five years of activity with Epitaph resulted in three studio albums and the greatest industry prominence in the band's career; the records reached six-digit record sales and SNFU toured alongside successful punk rock acts like Green Day and Bad Religion. Chinn's mental and physical health began to diminish during this era, however, due both to increased drug use and the trauma he faced following the death of his mother.

Late in 1997, Epitaph opted against renewing the band's contract. This resulted in heavy band debt and the departure of Brent Belke and longtime drummer Dave Rees; the remaining members nevertheless kept the band active as a four-piece for the first time in its career while seeking a new recording contract. This era ultimately ended after the departure of longtime bassist Rob Johnson and a hiatus in 2001.

== Personal struggles and third SNFU incarnation ==
Chinn then formed the new group Slaveco. with Matt Warhurst and Shane Smith, both future members of SNFU, and Jay Black. SNFU returned to activity late in 2003, releasing In the Meantime and In Between Time, their seventh studio album, and touring subsequently before again disbanding in 2005 due to further exhaustion and disagreements. Slaveco. became inactive shortly thereafter, and Chinn spiraled into depression, poverty, and addiction, which ultimately resulted in his homelessness. Nonetheless, Chinn at this time began work on an unfinished solo album in collaboration with other Vancouver musicians, including Johnson.

Chinn and former SNFU bassist Ken Fleming, now on guitar, began playing sets of SNFU material with a new rhythm section in 2007 before deciding to reform the band officially. Later joined by early drummer Jon Card and several new members, this third incarnation of SNFU spent the next several years touring Europe, Canada, and Central America.

Open Your Mouth and Say... Mr. Chi Pig, a biographical documentary film about Chinn, was released in March 2010. Produced by the Canadian company Prairie Coast Films and directed by Sean Patrick Shaul, the film told the story of Chinn's life and career, containing interview footage with such notables as Jello Biafra of the Dead Kennedys, Brendan Canning of Broken Social Scene, and Joey Keithley of D.O.A. citing SNFU's influence on them personally and the rock scene at large. The film also documented Chinn's struggles with addiction and ill health, and the escape from these conditions that the 2007 SNFU reunion represented.

In 2011, Chinn suffered from severe pneumonia, and SNFU became fractured following various members' emigrations. Despite this, the group managed to tour the following year in support of the band's official biography, Chris Walter's ...What No One Else Wanted to Say, released via GFY Press. Chinn also began performing solo acoustic sets, sometimes billed as DNFU (Distortion's No Fucking Use), in 2013. This same year, SNFU released Never Trouble Trouble Until Trouble Troubles You, their eighth and final studio album, before this lineup disbanded.

From 2014 to 2017, Chinn led new lineups of SNFU featuring former bassist Dave Bacon, Steffes, guitarist Kurt Robertson, and several drummers across various Canadian and European tours. The final SNFU performances occurred in Europe early in 2017. Though the band intended to continue, they announced a hiatus in early 2018 due to Chinn's health.

== Illness and death ==
After Chinn became too ill to continue performing with SNFU, he focused his attention on his art. In November 2019, BeatRoute journalist Sean Orr interviewed Chinn, who stated that he had been diagnosed with a serious medical condition expected soon to be fatal. Chinn recorded a solo 7" single with orchestral versions of "Hurt" (written by Nine Inch Nails and later famously covered by Johnny Cash) and SNFU's "Painful Reminder" that was released in May 2020, just a couple of months before his death on July 16. SNFU released the acoustic track "Cement Mixer" via YouTube shortly after his death. As per Chinn's wishes, the song was released the day of his death, with his remaining bandmates writing, "Mr Chi Pig wanted to give all his friends and fans one last gift the day his soul took flight. Enjoy."

== Discography ==
Solo and collaborative

- Removal Featuring Mr. Chi Pig: "Some Other Time" (7" single, 2000)
- "Hurt" b/w "Painful Reminder" (7" single, 2020)

SNFU

- See SNFU discography

The Wongs

- Don't Fuck with the Wongs cassette (1990)
