= Rob Johnson (musician) =

Canadian musician (born 1971)

- Birth name: Robert Arthur Johnson III
- Also known as: Freshbread, Starbuck, Da Buck
- Born: November 20, 1971 (age 53); Edmonton, Alberta, Canada
- Genres: Punk rock, hip hop, rock
- Instrument(s): Bass guitar, guitar, vocals
- Years active: 1988–present

Robert Arthur Johnson (born November 20, 1971, in Edmonton, Alberta, and also known under various pseudonyms, including Freshbread) is a Canadian musician currently based in Vancouver, British Columbia. He played bass guitar in the punk and alternative rock bands SNFU and the Wheat Chiefs, in addition to recording his own hip hop and hard rock music in various incarnations.

== Career ==
After playing in several small-scale local bands like Disco Graveyard and Dimestore Hoods, Johnson joined the Wheat Chiefs in 1992, a new project featuring members of the influential skate punk band SNFU. Later that year, he also joined the reconstituted SNFU, who soon signed to Epitaph Records and toured the world extensively. He served as the group's bassist and harmony vocalist, adding numerous songwriting contributions and a lead vocal performance on "Gaggle of Friends" from the 1996 FYULABA album. He opted to continue with the band in 1998 despite the loss of founding member Brent Belke and longtime drummer Dave Rees. Johnson ultimately left SNFU in 2001 after nine years, shortly before the band began an extended hiatus.

In 1999, Johnson began his hip-hop career under the Freshbread moniker. He released the Big Boss Battle album in 2002. Later, he also formed the hard rock band Air Raid Siren with former SNFU drummer Sean Stubbs.
