= Chris Walter (author) =

Canadian punk rock historian and novelist

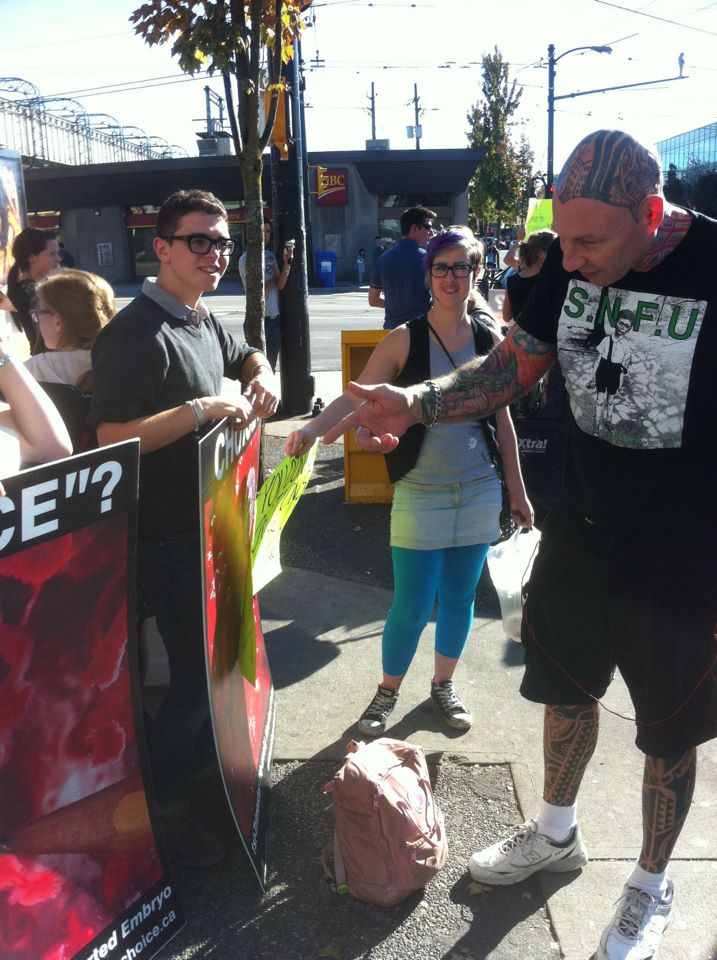
Chris Walter confronting Christian fundamentalists in East Vancouver

Chris Walter (August 16, 1959) is a Canadian punk rock historian, novelist and founder of the independent publishing company GFY Press. His work generally champions the rights of the oppressed while rejecting mainstream consumerism. Founded in 1998, GFY Press is privately funded and operates separately from the established literary industry.

== Biography ==
Born in Regina, Saskatchewan, Chris was raised in Winnipeg, Manitoba. He became involved with drugs at a very early age and was kicked out of school before leaving home at fifteen, working a succession of menial jobs and collecting welfare for long stretches. Forming his first punk rock band in 1980, Chris soon realized that he was never going to be a musician and began publishing a punk fanzine, Pages of Rage, which gave him his first taste of creative writing, although he wouldn't complete his first novel, Beer, until he was almost forty. His drug addiction raged out of control after moving to Vancouver, British Columbia in 1991, where he completed several novels but overdosed on heroin and eventually became homeless. Upon rehabilitation in January 2001, he devoted himself to work and to his family. Chris Walter resides in New Westminster BC with his long-time girlfriend and their son.

== GFY Press ==
Focusing mostly on music biographies and novels for and about the underclasses, GFY Press has published more than thirty-five titles to date. This includes twenty novels by Walter, his autobiographical trilogy, two collections of short stories, novels authored by Simon Snotface, Drew Gates, and Stewart Black, several non-fiction books, and biographies of Canadian punk groups Personality Crisis, SNFU, the Real McKenzies, Randy Rampage, and the Dayglo Abortions. Despite their dark subject matter, Walter's books are known for black humour, presented in prose described by critics as "convincing, lively, real, accessible, and wildly entertaining."

== Other contributions ==
Walter has also contributed to a number of publications, including The Nerve, Mass Movement, Razorcake, The Big Takeover, The Georgia Straight, Vice, Loud Fast Rules, The Republic, and Absolute Underground. He was featured in Prairie Coast Films' 2010 documentary Open Your Mouth And Say... Mr. Chi Pig, a film that looks at the life of SNFU singer Mr. Chi Pig.

== Bibliography ==
Literary Memoirs

- Mosquitoes & Whisky (2001)
- I Was a Punk Before You Were a Punk (2003)
- I'm On the Guest List (2005)

Novels

- Beer (1999)
- Anarchy Soup (2001)
- Kaboom (2002)
- Punk Rules OK (Published by Burn Books 2003)
- Boozecan (2004)
- East Van (2004)
- Langside (2006)
- Welfare Wednesdays (2006)
- Rock and Roll Heart (2008)
- Wrong (2009)
- Punch the Boss (2009)
- Sins of the Poor (2010)
- Up and Down On the Downtown Eastside (2011)
- Chase the Dragon (2013)
- Richie Dagger: Life & Times (2015)
- Liquor & Whores (2016)
- North of Hell (2019)
- Copz N Robberz (2022)
- Homeless in the City (2023)

Biographies

- Personality Crisis: Warm Beer and Wild Times (2008)
- Argh Fuck Kill: The Story of the DayGlo Abortions (2010)
- SNFU: What No One Else Wanted To Say (2012)
- Under the Kilt: the Real McKenzies Exposed (2015)
- Randy Rampage: I Survived D.O.A. (2016)
- Around the World With Mr Chi Pig--An Artist's Life (2023)

Short Stories

- Shouts from the Gutter (2007)
- Shrieks from the Alley (2012)

Nonfiction

- Tales From The Tattoo Shop (2017)
- Facebook Sucks: The Rise of Social Media (Jan 2025)

Also published by GFY Press

- Destroy Canada by Stewart Black and Chris Walter (2005)
- Prisoner of Evil by Simon Snotface (2005)
- The Crooked Beat by Drew Gates (2007)
