= Cargo Records (Canada) =

Canadian independent record label

- Founded: 1987; 38 years ago
- Founder: Eric Goodis; Randy Boyd; Phil Hill
- Defunct: 1997; 28 years ago
- Status: Defunct
- Genre: Alternative rock
- Country of origin: Canada
- Location: Montreal, Quebec

Cargo Records was a Canadian independent record label and distributor, active in the 1980s and 1990s. Based in Montreal, the company both released albums directly as a label, and distributed albums on behalf of many other small independent labels, making it one of the largest and most influential Canadian record companies of the alternative rock era.

By the mid-1990s, the company was so powerful that its decline toward bankruptcy between 1995 and 1997 initially appeared destined to set off a cascading failure of the entire Canadian music industry; however, these early predictions of disaster were averted as affected labels sought out new distribution arrangements. This period of retrenchment, in turn, has been credited with stabilizing the industry and in turn paving the way for the Canadian indie rock boom of the early 2000s.

== History ==
The label was originally formed in 1987 by Eric Goodis, Randy Boyd and Phillip Hill, three former staffers at Bonaparte Records, an independent record store in Montreal. Boyd was also formerly a partner in the short-lived punk label Psyche Industry Records.

Labels distributed in Canada by Cargo included both Canadian companies such as Mint Records, Murderecords and Sonic Unyon, and international labels such as Epitaph, Dischord, Taang!, Restless, Amphetamine Reptile, Alias, SST, Caroline, Ninja Tune and Sub Pop.

Artists signed directly to Cargo's label arm included Shadowy Men on a Shadowy Planet, Dyoxen, Change of Heart, Lost Dakotas, The Smalls, Nomeansno, The Killjoys, Asexuals, SNFU and Grimskunk; through its distribution deals, Cargo also held the Canadian rights to acts such as Mudhoney, Archers of Loaf, The Offspring, NOFX and Rancid, as well as to the earlier, pre-breakthrough albums by bands such as Nirvana, Green Day and Soundgarden.

In 1993, the company signed an upstream distribution deal with MCA Records, giving it an expanded national distribution channel and in turn giving MCA access to buzz bands such as Sloan, Furnaceface, Me Mom and Morgentaler, The Snitches and The Hardship Post, who were signed to labels distributed by Cargo.

The company's power reached its peak in 1995, when its existing contract as the Canadian distributor for Epitaph made it a significant beneficiary of the breakout success of The Offspring and Rancid. In that year, the company held a 2.3 per cent share of the music market in Canada, making it the second largest Canadian-owned music company behind only Quality Records; nonetheless, Cargo was considered more influential than Quality, as the latter was no longer distributing albums by individual artists and instead owed its market share entirely to MuchMusic-branded compilation albums.

At its peak, the company also had distribution offices in San Diego, Chicago and London; these offices operated as labels and distributors within their own countries — artists who released material through Cargo's American division included Blink-182, Rocket from the Crypt, Drive Like Jehu and 7 Seconds — as well as providing new international distribution channels for artists signed to or distributed by the Canadian office.

== Takeover and decline ==
The company's success also made it a desirable takeover target. Businessmen Allen Fox and Paul Allen bought out Boyd's share of the company in 1994, and acquired Goodis' and Hill's shares in 1995, becoming the sole owners of the company. Under Fox and Allen's management, the company moved to lavish new offices, underwent a rapid staffing expansion, and began offering incentives to independent labels to gain exclusive vendor lock-in privileges over those labels' manufacturing and distribution. Goodis and Hill later told Billboard that they sold their shares after several months of sharp disagreement with Fox and Allen about the direction of the company; both felt that Fox and Allen actually knew very little about the music business, but instead merely seemed to view owning a record company, particularly one flush with cash from a recent pair of smash hit albums, as a ticket to fast wealth.

The sale did not include the company's American or British offices; the American office became Cargo Music, a separate company headed by Goodis, while the British office became Cargo Records (UK), a separate company headed by Hill. Both of the spinoff companies were still in operation as of 2017.

However, financial irregularities quickly began cropping up in Cargo's business dealings under Fox and Allen's management: some labels began to report that Cargo was making its own decisions about how many copies of an album to press without reporting back to the labels, often leaving the labels unable to square their accounts because of discrepancies between the number of copies they had ordered and the number that were actually sold and/or returned; many labels reported unpaid bills from Cargo that in turn left them unable to pay their bands; and some retail chains, including HMV, entirely ceased business dealings with Cargo due to the company's frequent delays in properly fulfilling orders. Mint Records suffered the highest-profile setback during this period when it lost Gob, then its most lucrative act, to Nettwerk because of Cargo's failure to pay Mint for sales of the band's album Too Late... No Friends.

By the time it was clear that Cargo was likely headed toward bankruptcy, many labels began seeking out other arrangements. Sonic Unyon Records and Outside Music, notably, moved directly into distribution themselves, while other labels struck new distribution deals with Sonic Unyon, Outside, Koch International, Fusion III or other companies, in turn contributing to Cargo's decline; by 1997, the company had lost almost 75 per cent of its overall business. Fox and Allen attributed the company's decline to alternative rock's commercial "bust" in 1996 and 1997, with unsold returns from record stores in those years soaring to a record 49 per cent of the company's shipped product; however, the company's former subsidiary in the United States experienced a similar rate of product return in the same era, yet survived this period of difficulty in part by closing its distribution office in Chicago and consolidating its operations in the California office.

In 1996, Fox and Allen sought a deal which would have seen the company taken over by Tune 1000, a Quebec City-based music software company, but the deal fell through when Tune 1000's auditors discovered similar irregularities in Cargo's books.

The company ultimately filed for bankruptcy on December 19, 1997. Nearly 500 unsecured creditors were affected by the bankruptcy, including many independent labels and numerous bands. Companies affected included Epitaph (which was owed $511,000, making it the company's largest single unsecured creditor), Windsong, Caroline, Overground Trading, Om, Victory, Shock and Mushroom. Even Goodis and Hill were still owed over half a million dollars on their 1995 sale of the company. In total, the company had $3.77 million in unpaid debts by the time of its bankruptcy.
