= Brent Belke =

Canadian guitarist and composer

- Also known as: Bunt
- Born: February 1, 1965 (age 60); Edmonton, Alberta, Canada
- Genres: Punk rock, alternative rock, jazz, classical, avant garde
- Instrument(s): Guitar, keyboards, backing vocals, electronics
- Years active: 1981–present
- Labels: Epitaph Records, BYO Records

Brent Belke (born February 1, 1965, in Edmonton, Alberta) is a Canadian guitarist and composer. After playing in the punk and alternative rock bands SNFU and The Wheat Chiefs between 1981 and 1998, Belke began a career composing music for film and television.

== Career ==
=== SNFU and the Wheat Chiefs (1981–1998) ===
Belke formed Live Sex Shows with his twin brother Marc, also a guitarist, and singer Ken Chinn in 1981 after they met through the skateboarding subculture in Edmonton, Alberta. The band was short-lived, but the three founded a new group called Society's No Fucking Use (better known by the acronym SNFU) later that year. With a rotating rhythm section, SNFU released four LPs and served as catalysts for the skate punk movement in addition to influencing the punk rock scene at large before disbanding temporarily in 1989. After the group's first breakup, Marc and Brent founded the Wheat Chiefs, whose sound reflected power pop and melodic hardcore influences not immediately apparent in SNFU's material.

In 1991, offers for touring and significant record deals helped lead to SNFU's reformation, and the two bands, now located in Vancouver, British Columbia, operated in tandem for the next seven years. SNFU signed to Epitaph Records, released three further studio and one live album, and toured extensively; the Wheat Chiefs were less active, releasing only the Redeemer album in 1996.

Belke left rock music in 1998 to focus on scoring in film and television, accruing university degrees in jazz and classical composition. SNFU continued in his absence, while the Wheat Chiefs permanently disbanded.

=== Work in composition, recent activity (1998–present) ===
Belke has composed music for the films Cries in the Dark and The Accidental Witness, the television shows Road Hockey Rumble (for which he received a Leo Award nomination in 2008), So Weird, The Stagers, and numerous other works.

He performed a one-off concert with SNFU in 2001, and also played on one track on SNFU's 2004 album In the Meantime and In Between Time, their only release after his departure. His newest project is Existential Angst Party, an experimental avant-garde group. They released a full-length album in 2005.
