= Marc Belke =

- Also known as: Muc
- Born: February 1, 1965 (age 60); Edmonton, Alberta, Canada
- Genres: Punk rock, alternative rock
- Instrument(s): Guitar, vocals, saxophone, drums
- Years active: 1981–present
- Labels: Epitaph Records, BYO Records
- Website: www.marcbelke.com

Marc Belke (born February 1, 1965, in Edmonton, Alberta) is a Canadian musician and former radio personality. He played guitar in the punk and alternative rock bands SNFU and The Wheat Chiefs, and sang lead vocals in the latter. He was later an on-air personality with Rogers based in Victoria, British Columbia.

== Musical career ==
The youngest of five boys, Belke played in basement bands with his twin brother Brent as a teenager. The brothers formed their first gigging group, Live Sex Shows, in 1981. The band was fronted by singer Ken Chinn, whom they had met through the skateboarding subculture in Edmonton. The short-lived band quickly broke up, but the three formed a new group called Society's No Fucking Use, which was shortened to SNFU. The new band went on to serve as catalysts for the skate punk movement in addition to influencing the punk rock scene at large. Belke also played drums in the short-lived group Bing Jesus in the early 1980s.

Although many of the members of SNFU were involved in the band's compositions, Belke was the primary musical songwriter for much of the band's history, with Chinn as the lyricist. After three LPs in the 1980s and a temporary disbandment, the group relocated to Vancouver in 1992 and signed to Epitaph Records. They released three further albums with Epitaph.

In 1990, shortly after the first SNFU breakup, Marc and Brent Belke formed the Wheat Chiefs, adding power pop and melodic hardcore influences to their punk rock sound. In the Wheat Chiefs, Marc sang lead vocals and continued to share guitar duties with his brother. They released their only album, Redeemer, in 1996, before Brent left both bands to pursue a career in musical score composition for film and television.

SNFU continued as a four-piece after Brent's departure. Marc later formed the side project Based on a True Story in 2002, a group extant for about a year. SNFU again disbanded in 2005 following heavy touring. Chinn reformed the band two years later with former bassist Ken Fleming, but both Belkes opted against participating in this incarnation of the band.

After leaving SNFU, Belke ceased performing live but continued to work on solo recordings. In 2017 he released the SNFU single "A Happy Number" on his own Rake Records imprint.

== Career in radio ==
Following his departure from SNFU, Belke pursued a university degree in communications. He spent several years as an on-air personality with CFBV Radio in Smithers, British Columbia, and later CJUK FM, Magic 99.9. Thunder Bay, Ontario. He began working in Victoria in 2013, but ultimately left radio several years later.
