= Hundred Million =

2002 single by Treble Charger

Single by Treble Charger

from the album Detox
- Released: June 2002
- Studio: Phase One Studios (Toronto)
- Genre: Punk rock; pop-punk
- Length: 2:54
- Label: Virgin
- Songwriter: Treble Charger
- Producer: Matt Hyde

Treble Charger singles chronology
"Business" (2001)	"Hundred Million" (2002)	"Don't Believe It All" (2002)

"Hundred Million" is a song by Canadian rock band Treble Charger. It was released as the lead single from the band's fourth album, Detox. The song features backing vocals by Deryck Whibley and percussion by Steve Jocz, both from the band Sum 41, whom the lead singer Greig Nori managed. The song received a CASBY Award for "Favourite New Single" in 2002. The song peaked at No. 49 on the Radio & Records Alternative chart in 2003. The song is featured in the EA Sports hockey game NHL 2003.

== Music video ==
The music video for "Hundred Million" was filmed on May 27, 2002 in Toronto. The video was directed by Wendy Morgan featuring cameos from several Canadian artists including Avril Lavigne, Gob, Sum 41, and Swollen Members celebrating an informal industry alliance also including long-time collaborators Mark "London" Spicoluk and Jesse Colburn of Closet Monster and Nelly Furtado. It became one of the top music videos of 2002 in Canada.

Near the end of the video, Tom Thacker mooned, although it was frequently mistaken to be Lavigne. This misconception was referenced to when Lavigne pulled her pants halfway down to reveal MMVA written there at the 2003 MuchMusic Video Awards.

=== Awards and nominations ===
The video was nominated for five awards at the 2003 MuchMusic Video Awards, winning for MuchLoud Best Rock Video and video director Wendy Morgan winning for Best Director.

The video reached the #1 spot on MuchMusic Countdown for the week of October 4, 2002.

== Credits and personnel ==
Credits and personnel are adapted from the Detox album liner notes.

- Greig Nori – writer, vocals, guitar
- Bill Priddle – writer, vocals, guitar
- Rosie Martin – writer, bass
- Trevor MacGregor – writer, drums
- Deryck Whibley – additional vocals
- Ben Cook – additional vocals
- Matt Hyde – producer, engineering
- Paul Forgues – engineering, digital editing
- Ed Krautner – additional engineering, digital editing
- Greg Kolchinsky – assistant engineer
- Dan Druff – guitar tech
- Tom Lord-Alge – mixing at South Beach Studios (Miami Beach)
- Ted Jensen – mastering at Sterling Sound (New York City)
