= The Priddle Concern (album) =

Studio album by The Priddle Concern
- Released: May 6, 2008
- Recorded: 2004–2006
- Genre: Indie rock
- Label: Sparks Music
- Producer: Howie Beck, Andy Magoffin, Jack Critchley, Dave Neufeld

The Priddle Concern chronology
The Priddle Concern	...

The Priddle Concern is the debut solo album by The Priddle Concern, a project of former Treble Charger guitarist and songwriter Bill Priddle.

In addition to the core band members, Priddle, Scott Remila, Mitch Bowden and Dave Dunham, the album also featured guest appearances by Amy Millan, Justin Peroff, Evan Cranley and Brendan Canning, all of whom Priddle has worked with as an occasional member of Broken Social Scene. The album was produced by Howie Beck, Andy Magoffin, Jack Critchley and Dave Neufeld.

Some of the songs were written over a decade ago, as far back as 1996, although most of the songs were written and recorded between 2003 and 2006.

== Track listing ==
1. "Union of Concerned Scientists" - 1:16
2. "Videotape" - 2:50
3. "Care About You" - 3:52
4. "I Had A Job" - 2:59
5. "Like to Smoke" - 4:01
6. "Back Around" - 2:06
7. "Believe What You Want to Believe" - 3:31
8. "Dive" - 4:29
9. "Beaten Down" - 3:12
10. "Faucet Dripping" - 4:18
11. "Make It Go Away" - 3:08
12. "Everything's Fine" - 2:09
13. "Hold Me On Tight" 3:37

== Personnel ==
- Bill Priddle - lead vocals, guitar
- Mitch Bowden - guitar
- Scott Remila - bass
- Dave Dunham - drums, percussion

=== Guest members ===
- Amy Millan - vocals
- Brendan Canning - bass, vocals
- Justin Peroff - drums
- Evan Cranley - guitar, bass, percussion
