= Red (Treble Charger song) =

Single by Treble Charger

from the album Maybe It's Me
- Released: 1994 (nc17 version); November 1997 (Maybe It's Me version)
- Recorded: Fort Apache Studios, Boston
- Genre: Alternative rock
- Length: 5:10
- Label: Sonic Unyon (1997); RCA
- Songwriter: Treble Charger
- Producer: Lou Giordano

Treble Charger singles chronology
"How She Died" (1997)	"Red" (1994)	"American Psycho" (2000)

"Red" is a song by Canadian rock band Treble Charger. The song was originally released on their 1994 album, nc17, and was released as a single. The song was nominated for "Favourite New Song" at the 1995 CASBY Awards. In 1996, the song placed at number eight on the greatest Canadian songs of all time poll by music magazine Chart. In 1997, the song was re-recorded and re-released as the third and final single from their album Maybe It's Me.

== Commercial performance ==
The song received heavy play on university and college radio and on Much Music.

The re-recorded single debuted at No. 25 on the Canadian RPM Alternative 30 on 1 December 1997. The single was on the chart for six weeks, reaching its highest rank of No. 20 for the week of 15 December 1997.

The re-recorded version of "Red" also received significant airplay in the United States, peaking at No. 47 on the Radio & Records Rock chart in 1998.

== Charts ==
Chart (1997–1998)	Peak position
Canada Alternative (RPM)	20
US Rock (Radio & Records)	47

== Personnel ==
- Bill Priddle - lead vocals, guitar
- Greig Nori - guitar
- Rosie Martin - bass, backing vocals
- Mike Levesque - drums
- Morris Palter - drums (1994 version)
