= Friend of Mine (Treble Charger song) =

Single by Treble Charger

from the album Maybe It's Me
- Released: May 1997
- Recorded: Fort Apache Studios, Boston
- Genre: Alternative rock
- Length: 3:46
- Songwriter: Treble Charger
- Producer: Lou Giordano

Treble Charger singles chronology
"Morale" (1996)	"Friend of Mine" (1997)	"How She Died" (1997)

"Friend of Mine" is a song by Canadian alternative rock band Treble Charger. It was released in May 1997 as the lead single from the band's third studio album, Maybe It's Me. The song was used by ESPN as the theme music for the 1997 X Games Wakeboarding Championship.

== Personnel ==
- Greig Nori - guitar, lead vocals, backing vocals
- Rosie Martin - bass
- Bill Priddle - guitar
- Mike Levesque - drums

== Charts ==
Chart (1997)	Peak position
Canadian RPM Singles Chart	41
Canadian RPM Alternative 30	9
