= Detox (Treble Charger album) =

Studio album by Treble Charger
- Released: August 20, 2002
- Recorded: Phase One, Signal to Noise, and Metalworks Studios, Mississauga, Ontario, Canada
- Genres: Pop-punk, alternative rock
- Length: 38:42
- Label: ViK
- Producers: Matt Hyde; Deryck Whibley

Treble Charger chronology
Wide Awake Bored (2000)	Detox (2002)

Professional ratings
Review scores
Source	Rating
Allmusic	2/5 stars

Detox is the fifth studio album by Canadian rock band Treble Charger, released in August 2002. The album was certified Gold in Canada. The album was nominated for "Rock Album of the Year" at the 2003 Juno Awards.

== Track listing ==
All songs written by Treble Charger.

1. "Hundred Million" – 2:54
2. "What You Want" – 2:54
3. "Can't Wake Up" – 2:48
4. "The First Time" – 3:10
5. "Ideal Waste of Time" – 3:11
6. "Hole in Your Head" – 2:48
7. "Don't Believe It All" – 4:20
8. "Over My Head" – 3:18
9. "Tired of It Anyway" – 3:05
10. "The Downward Dance" – 2:49
11. "Drive" – 7:19

== Credits ==
- Treble Charger
  - Greig Nori - Guitar, Vocals
  - Bill Priddle - Guitar, Vocals
  - Rosie Martin - Bass
  - Trevor McGregor - Drums
- Sum 41
  - Deryck Whibley - Vocals, Guitar, Co-Producer
  - Steve Jocz - Drums
- Matt Hyde - Producer, Engineer, Mixing
- Zach Blakestone - Assistant
- Ben Cook - Vocals
- Dan Druff - Guitar Technician
- Paul Forgues - Engineer, Digital Editing, Assistant
- Greg Kolchinsky - Assistant Engineer
- Ed Krautner - Engineer, Digital Editing
- Tom Lord-Alge - Mixing
- Dave Ogilvie - Mixing
- Jon Sawyer - Drawing

== Charts ==
Chart (2002)	Peak position
Top Canadian Albums	10

=== Year-end charts ===
Year-end chart performance for Detox by Treble Charger
Chart (2002)	Position
Canadian Albums (Nielsen SoundScan)	189
Canadian Alternative Albums (Nielsen SoundScan)	61
