= Wide Awake Bored =

Studio album by Treble Charger
- Released: July 25, 2000 (Canada); April 24, 2001 (United States)
- Recorded: 1999
- Studio: Sound City, Van Nuys; Grandmaster, Hollywood; King Sound & Pictures Studios, Los Angeles
- Genre: Pop-punk; power pop; alternative rock
- Length: 40:39
- Label: Nettwerk
- Producer: Matt Hyde

Treble Charger chronology
Maybe It's Me (1997)	Wide Awake Bored (2000)	Detox (2002)

American release cover

Wide Awake Bored is the fourth album by Canadian rock band Treble Charger. The album was released in 2000 in Canada and in 2001 in the United States. The album featured the singles "American Psycho", "Brand New Low" and "Business", all which had music videos and received notable radio airplay. "Brand New Low" and "American Psycho" were included in the NHL 2002 by EA Sports, plus "Wear Me Down" and "Business" were featured in EA's Triple Play 2002.

== Track listing ==
All songs written by Treble Charger.

No.	Title	Length
1.	"Brand New Low"	3:53
2.	"American Psycho"	3:24
3.	"Business"	3:26
4.	"Cheat Away"	3:47
5.	"Funny"	4:13
6.	"Favorite Worst Enemy"	4:04
7.	"More's the Pity"	3:55
8.	"I Don't Know"	3:54
9.	"Wear Me Down"	3:04
10.	"Another Dollar"	3:01
11.	"Just What They Told Me"	3:54

== Reception ==
Professional ratings
Review scores
Source	Rating
Allmusic	2.5/5 stars
Artist Direct	2.5/5 stars

Wide Awake Bored was voted as the seventh-best CD of 2000 by CFNY-FM listeners. The album was nominated for "Rock Album of the Year" at the 2001 Juno Awards. Also, their hit single "American Psycho" was nominated in the "Best Single" category. This album was Treble Charger's most successful album to date, reaching platinum status in Canada.

== Personnel ==
- Treble Charger - photography
  - Greig Nori - guitar, vocals
  - Bill Priddle - guitar, vocals, keyboards
  - Rosie Martin - bass, backing vocals
  - Trevor McGregor - drums
- Matt Hyde - producer, engineer
- Dan Druff - assistant producer, guitar technician
- Jeff Skelton - assistant engineer
- Andrew Alekel - assistant engineer
- Mike Terry - assistant engineer
- Tom Lord-Alge - mixing
- David Bendeth - mixing, A&R
- Jack Joseph Puig - mixing
- Randy Staub - mixing
- Don Heffington - percussion on "Brand New Low", "Funny" and "Just What They Told Me"
- Rami Jaffee - additional keyboards on "Funny" and "Just What They Told Me"
- John Rummen - cover art

== Year-end charts ==
Chart (2000)	Position
Canadian Albums (Nielsen SoundScan)	130
