= Trinity-Bellwoods =

Trinity–Bellwoods
- Neighbourhood
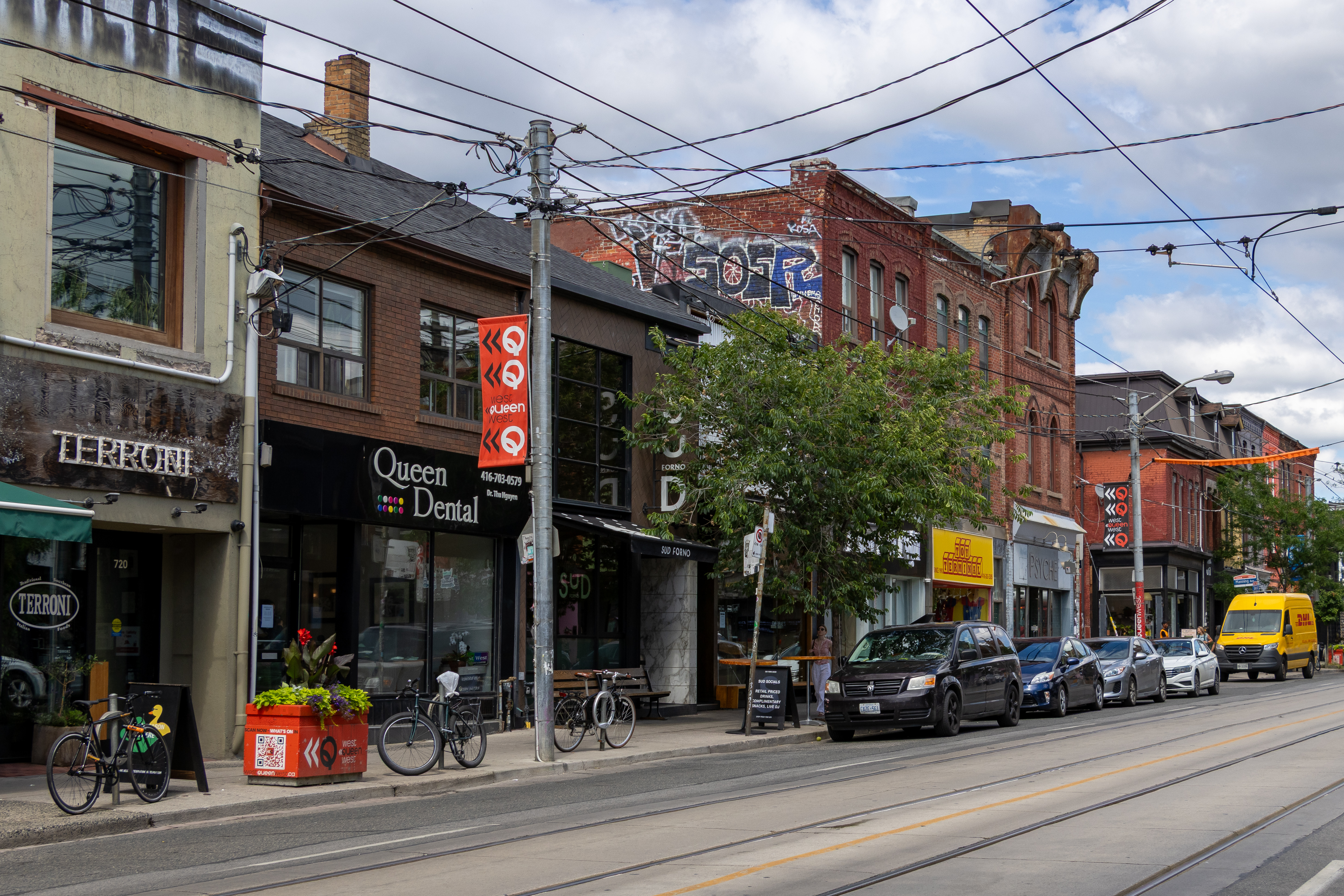
- View of storefronts in Trinity-Bellwoods along Queen Street West

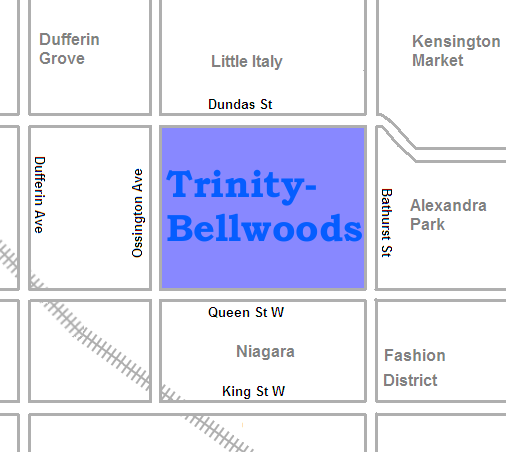
- Vicinity of Trinity–Bellwoods

- Location within Toronto
- Coordinates: 43°38.8′N 79°24.5′W
- Country: Canada
- Province: Ontario
- City: Toronto

Government
  - Councillor: Dianne Saxe
  - M.P.: Chrystia Freeland (Liberal)
  - M.P.P.: Jessica Bell (NDP)

Trinity-Bellwoods is an inner city neighbourhood in Toronto, Ontario, Canada. It is bounded on the east by Bathurst Street, on the north by College Street, on the south by Queen Street West, and by Dovercourt Road on the west. It has a large Portuguese (mostly originally from the Azores and Madeira islands) and Brazilian community, and many local Portuguese-Canadian businesses are located along Dundas Street West, continuing west into Little Portugal; this stretch further west along Dundas is known as Rua Açores.

The neighbourhood takes its name from Trinity Bellwoods Park, built around the former Garrison Creek ravine. Bounded on the north by Dundas Street West and on the south by the Queen Street West district, the park is immediately accessible from major pedestrian and bicycling thoroughfares and is bounded on the east and the west by quiet residential streets. Accordingly, the park has a large natural "constituency". The park also sports a range of environments, including tennis courts, a playground, a hockey rink, a dog walking bowl, a grove, a range of picnic tables, a greenhouse, a community center, and a swimming pool. The northwestern panhandle is home to a farmer's market on Tuesday afternoons from spring to fall.

== History ==
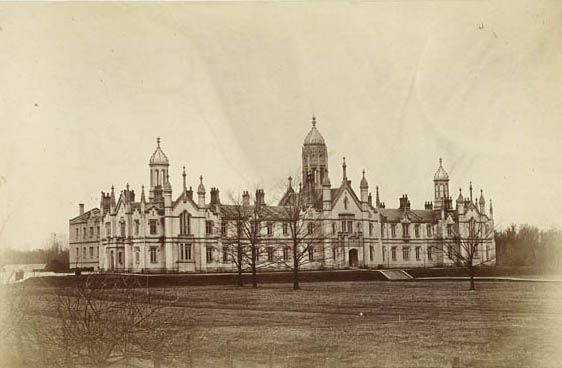
Trinity College, c. 1856. Completed only four years earlier, the building was situated in present-day Trinity Bellwoods Park.

Trinity Bellwoods Park was the original site of Trinity College, one of the colleges that now make up the University of Toronto. The college building, which was completed in 1852, stood roughly at the centre of the park, and remained there for just over 100 years. Today the only remaining artifacts of the school are its restored gates at the south end of the park.

By 1900, the college and its picturesque surroundings attracted residential development. Most of the surrounding streets were filled in with tall, narrow houses of the Bay-and-gable or Gothic Revival style characteristic of much of Toronto's housing stock from that era. A number of fine homes from the period are scattered throughout the neighborhood.

During the 20th century the neighborhood became a landing site for immigrants of various nationalities, setting a pattern for the next six to seven decades. From the 1920s and 1930s the area became home to many Polish and Ukrainian immigrants; the Bathurst-Queen area was the heart of the city's Polish and Ukrainian communities until the 1960s. By the 1960s, the area had become popular among the immigrants from Portugal, who now define much of the neighborhood's character. The businesses along Ossington Avenue just north of Queen Street have changed in the last decade, with former sports bars and social clubs becoming trendy restaurants, bars and cafes. Some of this conversion has been due to higher commercial rents along Queen Street relative to Ossington Avenue properties. The high conversion rate into bars and the accompanying late-night noise prompted a city-ordered halt to conversions and new liquor serving licenses along Ossington.

== Demographic ==
According to the 2011 National Household Survey, Ontario remains the most common place of birth for respondents of the area bordered by Dovercourt, Dundas West, Queen West and Gore Avenue, with 1800 claiming place of birth in Ontario. The second most common place of birth was Portugal, with 785. In descending order, respondents indicated that they had been born in another province or territory in Canada (370), Vietnam (70), or Italy (35).

== Education ==
Three public school boards operate elementary schools in Trinity–Bellwoods, the Conseil scolaire Viamonde (CSV), the Toronto Catholic District School Board (TCDSB), and the Toronto District School Board (TDSB). CSV and TDSB are secular public school boards, the former being French-based, the latter being English-based. TCDSB is an English-based separate public school board. Elementary schools in the area include:

- Charles G. Fraser Junior Public School
- École élémentaire Pierre-Elliott-Trudeau
- Givins/Shaw Junior Public School
- Pope Francis Catholic Public School
- Ossington/Old Orchard Junior Public School

== Recreation ==
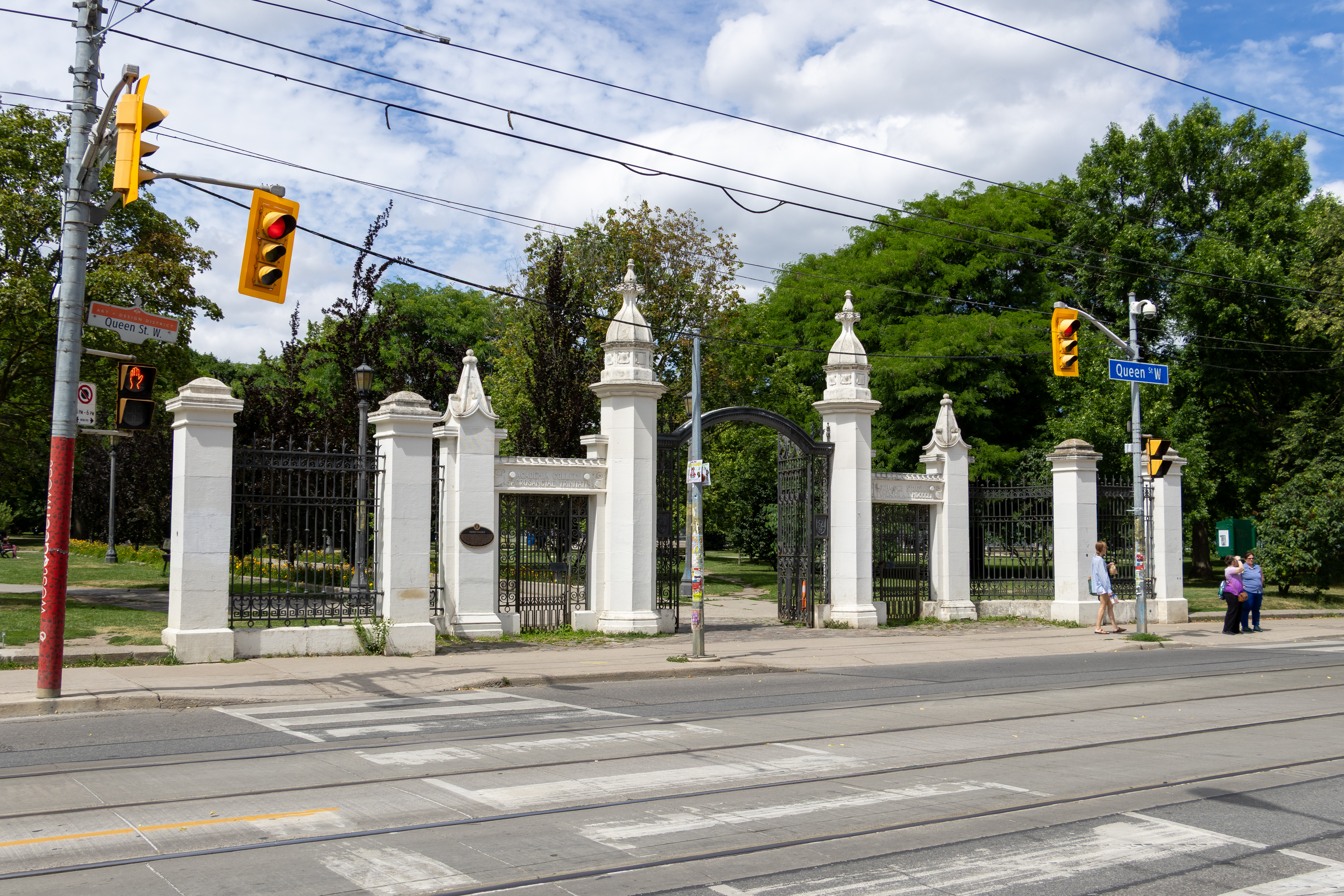
Gates at the southern entrance to Trinity Bellwoods Park

Trinity–Bellwoods is home to several parks, including Trinity Bellwoods Park. Parks in the neighbourhood are managed by the Toronto Parks, Forestry and Recreation Division. Trinity Bellwoods Park is a major park that occupies the ravines that surrounded the buried Garrison Creek. The park also features Crawford Street Bridge, a buried, but intact bridge in the north part of municipal park.

Other notable attractions and landmarks in the area include the Museum of Contemporary Canadian Art, and St. Matthias Bellwoods.
