= Chore (band) =

Canadian post-hardcore band

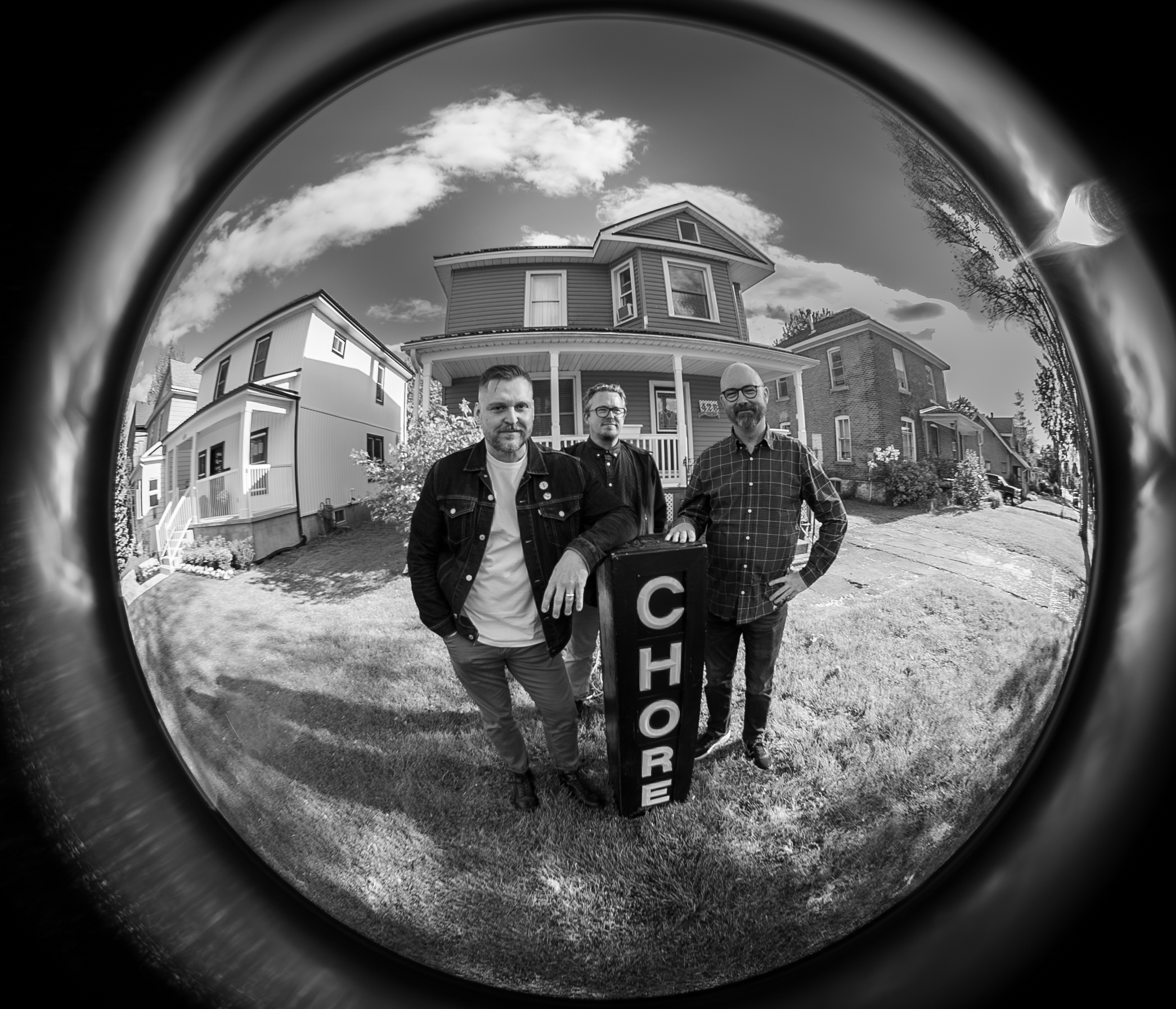
- Chore in 2025 (L to R David Dunham, Chris Bell, Mike Bell)

Background information
- Origin: Dunnville, Ontario, Canada
- Genres: Post-hardcore, hard rock, math rock, indie rock, alternative rock
- Years active: 1995–2004, 2010, 2024 (one-off), 2025 - present
- Label: Sonic Unyon
- Members: Chris Bell; Mike Bell; David Dunham; Mitch Bowden; Brian Pettigrew
- Website: https://www.choreband.com/

Chore are a Canadian post-hardcore band from Dunnville, Ontario.

== History ==
Chore formed in January 1995. They released three albums on the Sonic Unyon indie label in Hamilton, Ontario: Another Plebeian came out in 1997 and Take My Mask and Breathe in 1999. They also contributed an exclusive recording to Redstar Records' 1999 Various Artists compilation The Sound and the Fury. Chore was approached by Revelation Records and took part in NXNE in 2000, but decided to remain with Sonic Unyon.

The Coastaline Fire was released in 2002 to positive reviews, and was also sold in Japan beginning in 2003.

Their video for the single "General Warning" won a "Best of the Wedge 1999" award from broadcaster MuchMusic, while the video for "The Hitchhiker" saw airplay on MuchLOUD and MTV's 120 Minutes. The songs "The Hitchhiker" and "Burr" were both featured in an episode from the first season of Fox's 24.

Chore disbanded in April 2004. Lead vocalist Chris Bell continued to produce music under the moniker Alive and Living, until recently joining Mitch Bowden and David Dunham to perform in Don Vail and The Priddle Concern, along with Bill Priddle (formerly of Treble Charger).

The band reunited in December 2010 for a string of shows, including opening slots for Billy Talent, Alexisonfire, and Wintersleep.

The band reunited in June of 2024 for a one-off unannounced show at the Casbah, in Hamilton, Ontario, for a good friend's birthday.

In July 2025, the band unveiled they have recorded a new album, Oswego Park, due to be released on September 5, 2025, via Sonic Unyon. The band also released the first single and video from the album, "Cowards Can", the same month. The band also announced a show for September 6, 2025, in Hamilton, Ontario.

== Discography ==
- Another Plebeian (1997)
- Take My Mask and Breathe (1999)
- The Coastaline Fire (2002)
- Oswego Park (2025)

== See also ==
- Music of Canada
- Canadian rock
- List of bands from Canada
- List of Canadian musicians
- Category:Canadian musical groups
