= The Priddle Concern =

Canadian musical group

- Origin: Toronto, Ontario, Canada
- Genre: Indie rock
- Years active: 2008–present
- Label: Sparks Music
- Members: Bill Priddle; Scott Remila; Mitch Bowden; Dave Dunham
- Website: thepriddleconcern.com

The Priddle Concern is a Canadian indie rock band formed in Toronto, Ontario by Bill Priddle.

== History ==
Priddle formed The Priddle Concern in 2008 and began performing around Ontario. It was his first project after leaving Treble Charger in 2003. The band consists of Priddle on vocals and guitar, Mitch Bowden (formerly of Chore) on guitar, Scott Remila of Raising the Fawn on bass, and Dave Dunham of Chore on drums. Priddle is also a supporting musician in Don Vail, a band fronted by Bowden.

The band signed with Sparks Music and released its debut album, The Priddle Concern in 2008. The album included contributions from several members of Broken Social Scene.

== Band members ==
- Bill Priddle - lead vocals, guitar (2008–present)
- Mitch Bowden - guitar (2008–present)
- Scott Remila - bass (2008–present)
- David Dunham - drums, percussion (2008–present)

== Discography ==
- The Priddle Concern (2008)
- Untitled Second Album (2011)
