= What I Want =

What I Want may refer to:

- "What I Want" (Dead or Alive song), 1983
- "What I Want" (Daughtry song), 2007
- "What I Want" (Morgan Wallen song), 2025
- What I Want, a 2004 album by The Breakers
- "What I Want", a 2007 song by Bob Sinclair and Fireball from Soundz of Freedom
- "What I Want", a 2004 song by Autopilot Off from Make a Sound
- "What I Want", a 2012 song by Sean Paul from Tomahawk Technique
- "What I Want", a 2022 song by MUNA from Muna
- "What I Want", a 2026 song by Yeat from ADL

== See also ==
- "Thats What I Want", a 2021 song by Lil Nas X
- "What I Want is What I've Got", a song by Westlife from Westlife
