= Looking Up =

Looking Up may refer to:

== Albums ==
- Looking Up (Hugh Fraser album), 1988
- Looking Up (Autopilot Off album), or the title song, 2000
- Looking Up (Michelle Gayle album), or the title song, 2000
- Looking Up (Sidewalk Prophets album), 2025

== Films ==
- Looking Up (film), 2019 Chinese film

== Songs ==
- "Looking Up" (Elton John song), 2015
- "Looking Up", by Eels from Tomorrow Morning
- "Looking Up", by Michael W. Smith from Michael W. Smith Project
- "Looking Up", by Paramore from Brand New Eyes
