= American Psycho (song) =

2000 song by Treble Charger

Single by Treble Charger

from the album Wide Awake Bored
- Released: July 24, 2000
- Genre: Pop-punk; power pop; alternative rock
- Length: 3:23
- Label: Nettwerk
- Songwriter: Greig Nori
- Producer: Matt Hyde

Treble Charger singles chronology
"Red" (1997)	"American Psycho" (2000)	"Brand New Low" (2001)

"American Psycho" is a song by Canadian band Treble Charger. It was released in July 2000 as the lead single from their fourth album, Wide Awake Bored. The song was a hit in Canada, peaking at number 4 on Canada's Rock chart. The song was nominated for "Best Single" at the 2001 Juno Awards. It is arguably considered to be the band's signature song. As of 2026, the song has received 10 million streams on the streaming service Spotify.

== Charts ==
Chart (2000)	Peak position
Canada Top 30 Rock Report (RPM)	4

== In popular culture ==
- The song is featured on the MuchMusic compilation album, Big Shiny Tunes 5.
- The song is featured in the films, Dude, Where's My Car? and She Gets What She Wants.
- The song was featured on the soundtrack to the EA Sports Hockey game NHL 2002, along with another Treble Charger song, "Brand New Low".
- The song was used in promotional advertisements for the direct-to-video movie American Pie: Band Camp.
- The song was used as a plot point in the "Treble Charger" episode of Kevin Spencer.
- The song was used in the fifth episode of Tony Hawk's Gigantic Skatepark Tour 2002.
