= Trinity Bellwoods Park =

Public park in Toronto, Ontario, Canada

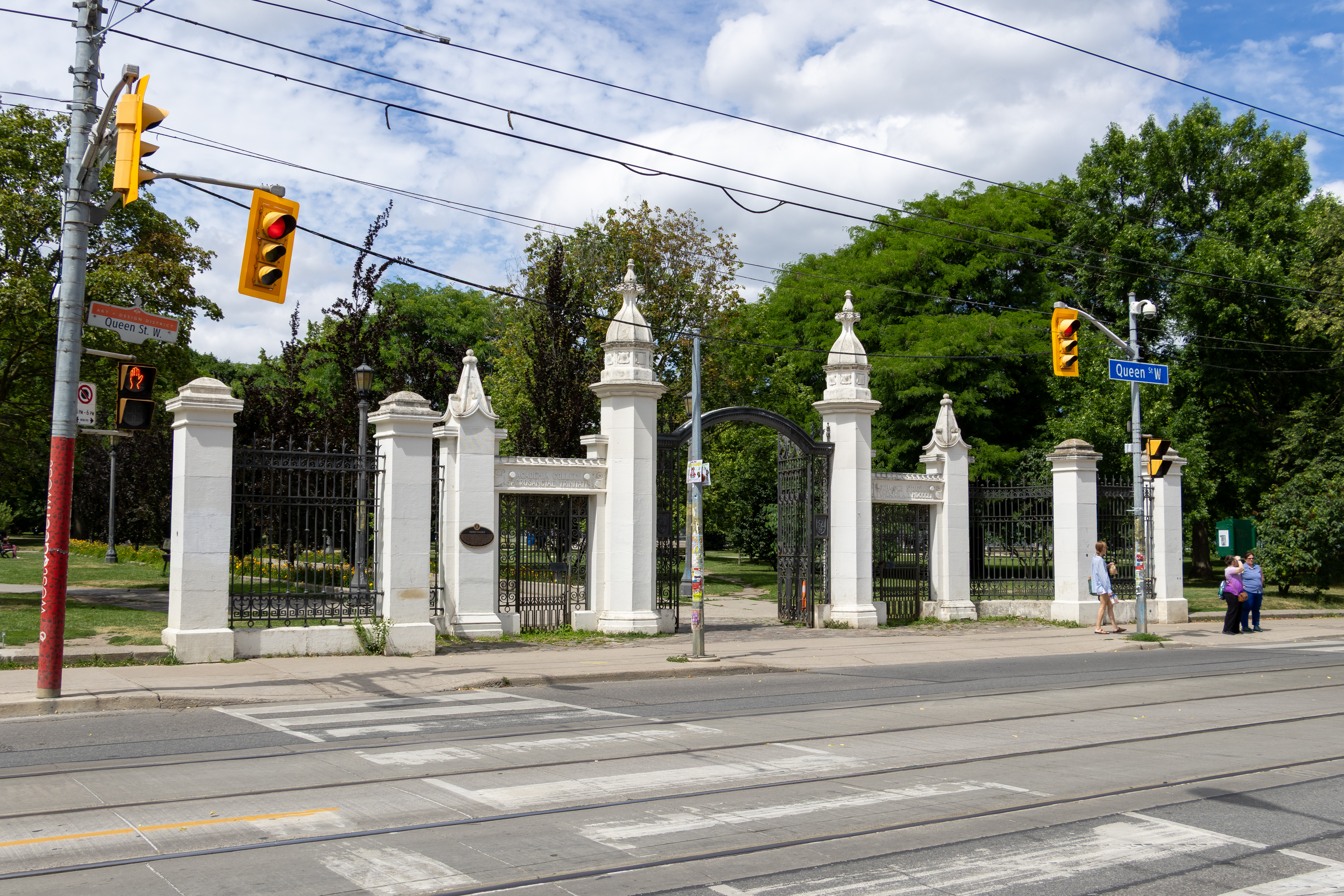
- The gates at the southern entrance to the park

- Location within Toronto
- Type: public park
- Location: Toronto, Ontario, Canada
- Coordinates: 43°38′52″N 79°24′51″W
- Operator: City of Toronto

{{

Trinity Bellwoods Park is a public park located in Toronto, Ontario, Canada, bordered by Queen Street West on the south and Dundas Street on the north. The western boundary of the park is Crawford Street, several hundred feet before Crawford intersects with Dundas St. West, the park juts toward Shaw Street, westside of the Crawford Street Bridge. Most of the park's area lies in the original Garrison Creek ravine and this creek, now a buried city storm sewer, still flows beneath the park from the northwest to the southeast corners.

== History ==
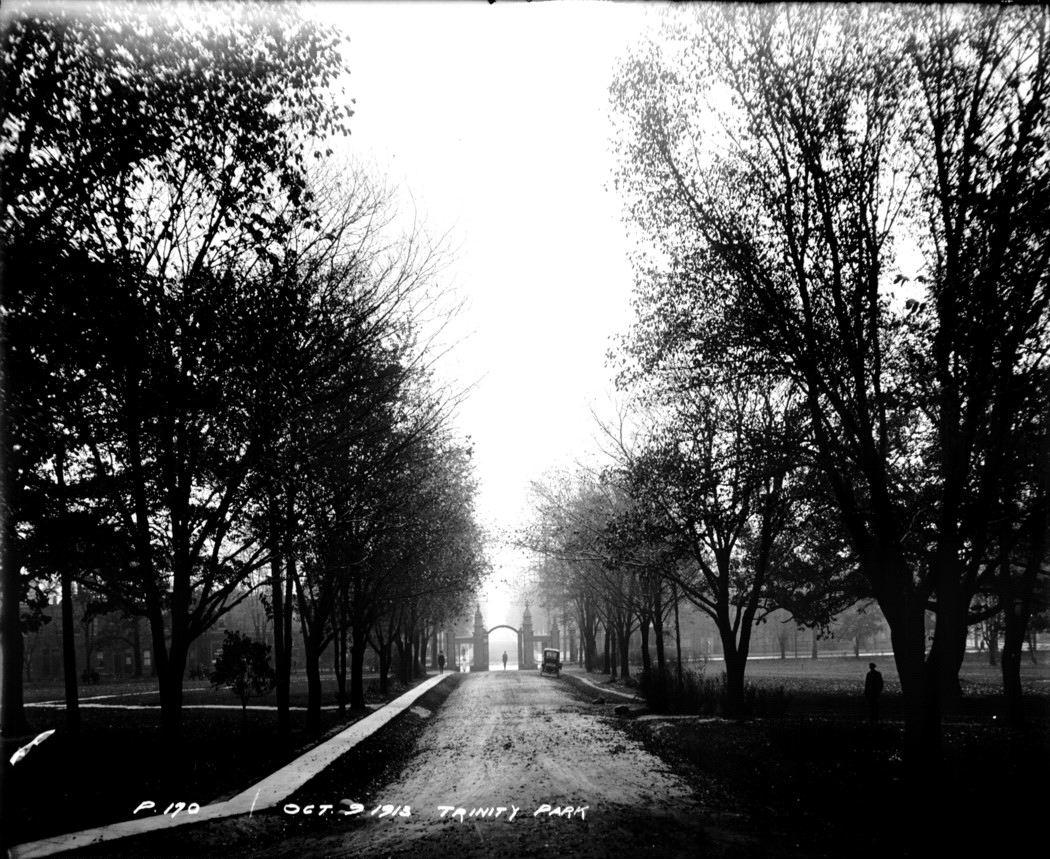
Looking south towards the gates and Queen Street West in 1913

The old Garrison Creek emptied into Lake Ontario at the site of Fort York, and the land north and west of the fort was set aside as a military reserve. As the town of York grew around the fort, the military reserve was gradually sold off in lots to retiring British officers and friends of the military command. Samuel Smith was granted 100 acres (0.40 km^{2}) of land in 1806, which he called Gore Vale after Lieutenant Governor Francis Gore; "vale" referred to Garrison Creek ravine. A portion of Smith's grant later became the park.

When the park was first created (after 1900) it was referred to as Bellwoods Park in the 1903 Goad's Map with a nearby street named Bellwoods Avenue. The Bellwoods name is believed to be associated to former alderman William Bell, who served St. Stephen's Ward from 1881 to 1883 and again from 1888 to 1896.

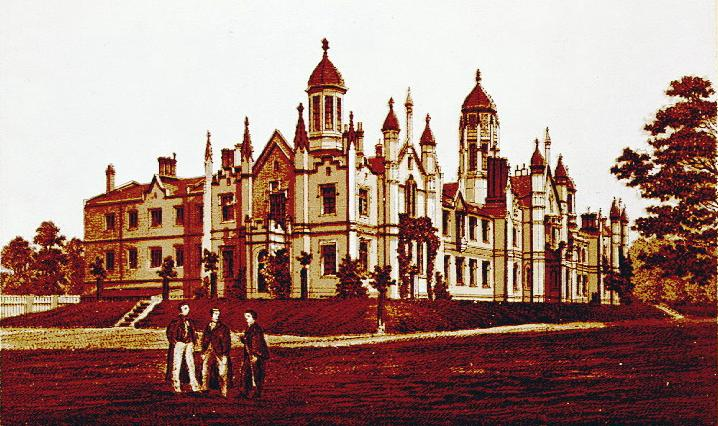
Kivas Tully's Trinity College building, c. 1851

Much of the current parkland was originally purchased from Janet Cameron (sister of Lieutenant Colonel Duncan Cameron C.B. who first lived here) of Gore Vale in 1851 by Scottish-Canadian Bishop John Strachan, an influential Anglican cleric who wanted Toronto to have a private college with strong Anglican ties, partly in opposition to the recently secularized University of Toronto. Buildings were soon constructed (Gothic Revival structure by architect Kivas Tully) and students began attending Trinity College in 1852. After federation with the University of Toronto in 1904 and completion of the downtown Trinity campus in 1925, the school left this location. The original buildings were then sold to the City of Toronto and most were demolished in the early 1950s. The destruction of the Trinity buildings marked the beginning of two decades of extensive heritage destruction in Toronto. Of the college itself, only the stone gates now remain, at the Queen Street park entrance facing south on Strachan Avenue, although the former St. Hilda's College building from 1899, (the women's residence of Trinity College) still overlooks the northern half of the park on the western edge. It is now a seniors' residence, John Gibson House. The iron gates are replica with original now installed at Trinity College School entrance on Deblaquire Street North in Port Hope, Ontario.

In the 1950s, Garrison Creek was entirely buried and the creek ravine backfilled around the Crawford Street Bridge with displaced soil from the new Bloor-Danforth subway line, raising the surface of the northern end of the park to almost the height of Dundas Street. The steep drop from this upper level to the lower part of the park has become a popular local toboggan run in winter. The larger southern part of the 'bowl' is the largest designated dogs 'off-leash' park. Picnic tables are also provided here for summertime use and public washroom facilities. There is a historical plaque the commemorates the bridge buried under this stretch of Crawford, just south of Dundas West.

In 2001, the Friends of Trinity Bellwoods Park was formed to coordinate volunteer activities and provide input to the city on park management. It is made up of volunteer community members.

== Features ==
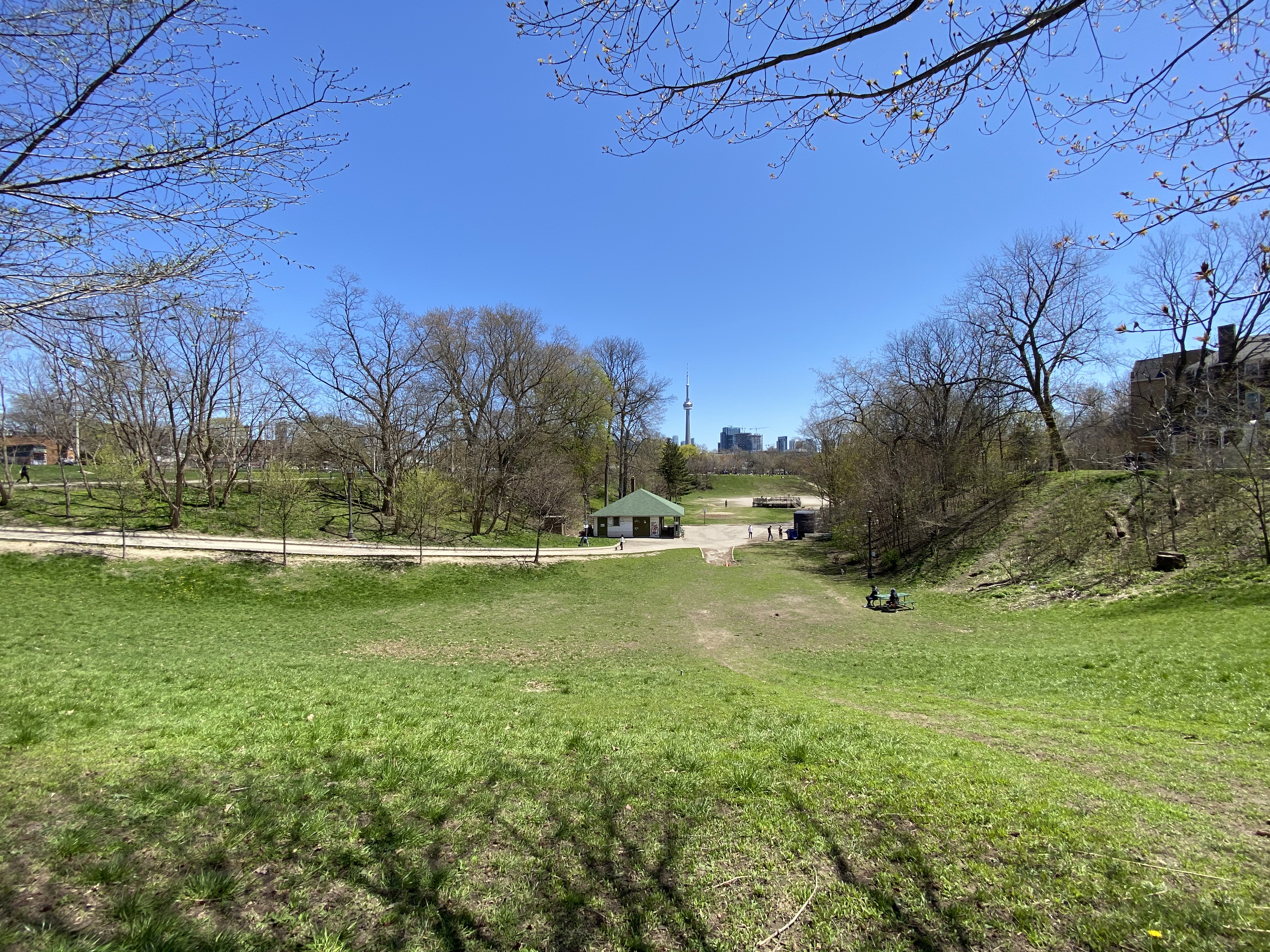
View of the park with the CN Tower in the background

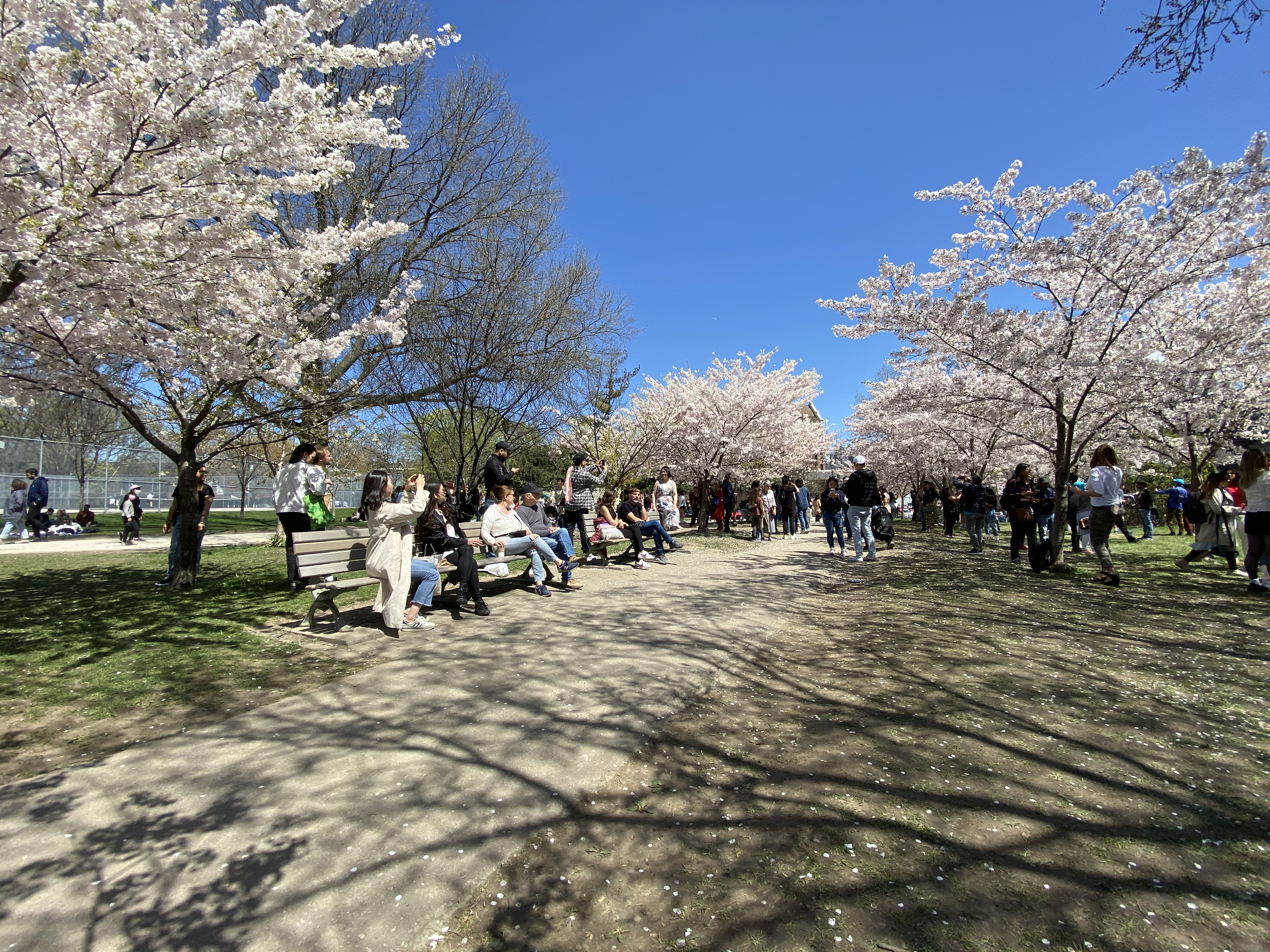
Cherry blossom in the park

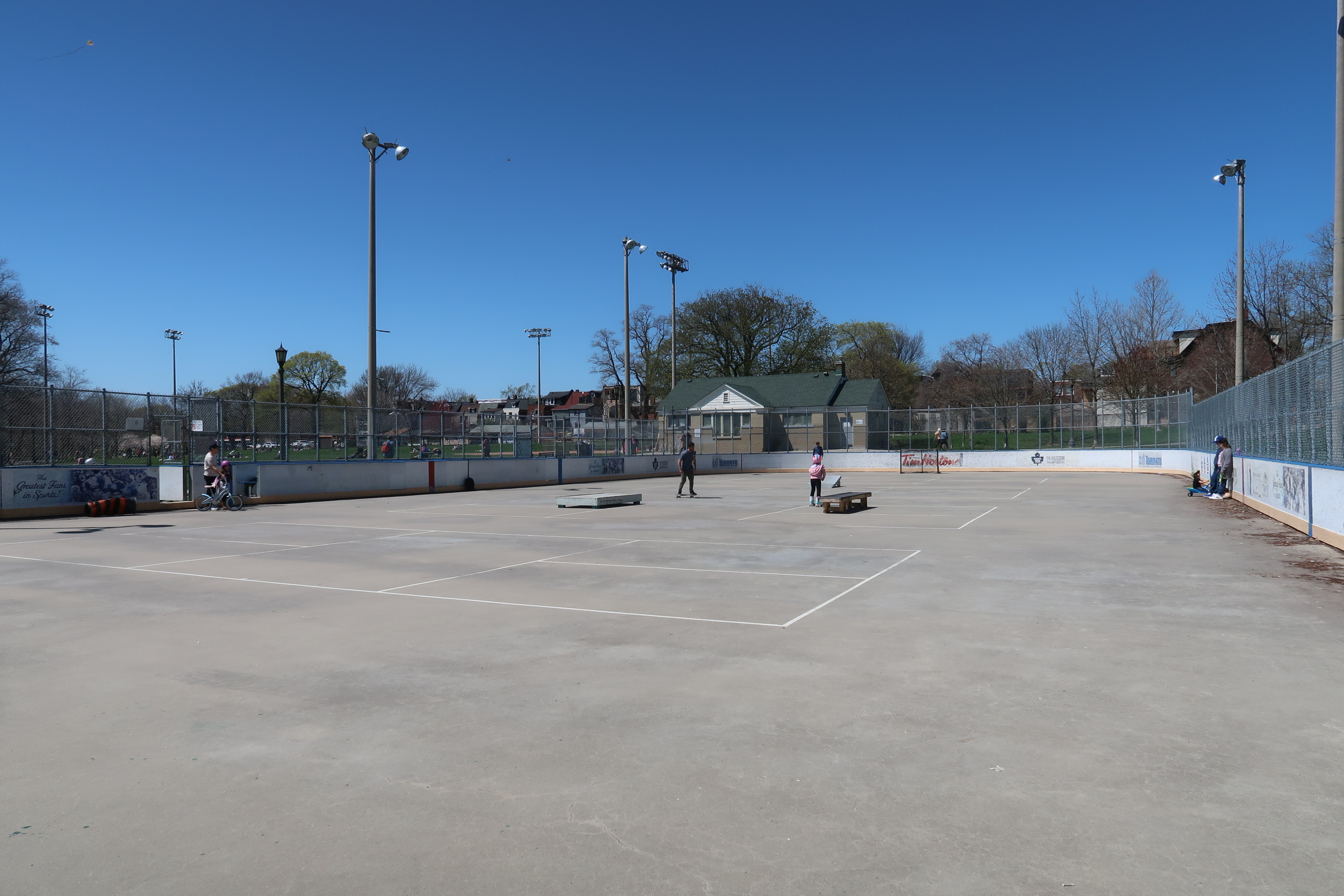
Trinity Bellwoods Park Hockey Rink

The park is 15.4 hectares (38 acres). It has a community recreation centre, managed and owned by the City of Toronto, called Trinity CRC, located at 155 Crawford Street on the west side of the park. It has two indoor pools, gymnasium, fitness centre, indoor walking/running track and multi-purpose rooms. Adjacent to the centre, in the park, are a volleyball court, large playground, and children's outdoor wading pool. Also in the park are eight outdoor tennis courts located in the south-east corner and an outdoor ice skating rink at the north-east boundary and volleyball court just north of the Rec Centre. There is also field space for soccer, football, and rugby, as well as three softball fields along the east boundary. Toronto Parks, Forestry and Recreation Division maintain a marked Discovery Walk and shared pedestrian/cycling trail above and parallel to Garrison Creek, which runs through the park from the northwest to the southeast. Trinity Bellwoods is a favourite place for local residents to walk their dogs. The ravine, known as the dog bowl, is the designated leash-free area. The park is a destination for many to picnic, play sports, and enjoy nature. The park's baseball diamond is officially named SkyDome in reference to the popular former name of the Rogers Centre.

The park is home to white squirrels, the subject of urban folklore in the city. The Toronto Special news magazine featured White Squirrel hunts in a past issue. The true albino squirrels have pink eyes. It is deemed good luck to have spotted one, or two. As there are families of them.

There are native and imported trees planted throughout the park. The Friends of Trinity Bellwoods Park run the volunteer Adopt-a-tree program (originated by the Friends) that helps support the survival of newly planted trees. The emerald ash borer beetle is slowly infesting the trees and succession planting and Parks, Forestry and Recreation have been planting every year to replace the many that are designated to be cut down because of this beetle.

== Events and activities ==
Trinity Bellwoods has been the site of many recent cultural events, including outdoor movie nights, an anarchist bookfair, live theatre, performance art, and informal summer drumming circles. In June 2007 a weekly farmers' market opened in the northwest corner of the park, at Shaw and Dundas. It currently operates every Tuesday from 3-7pm from early May to the end of October.

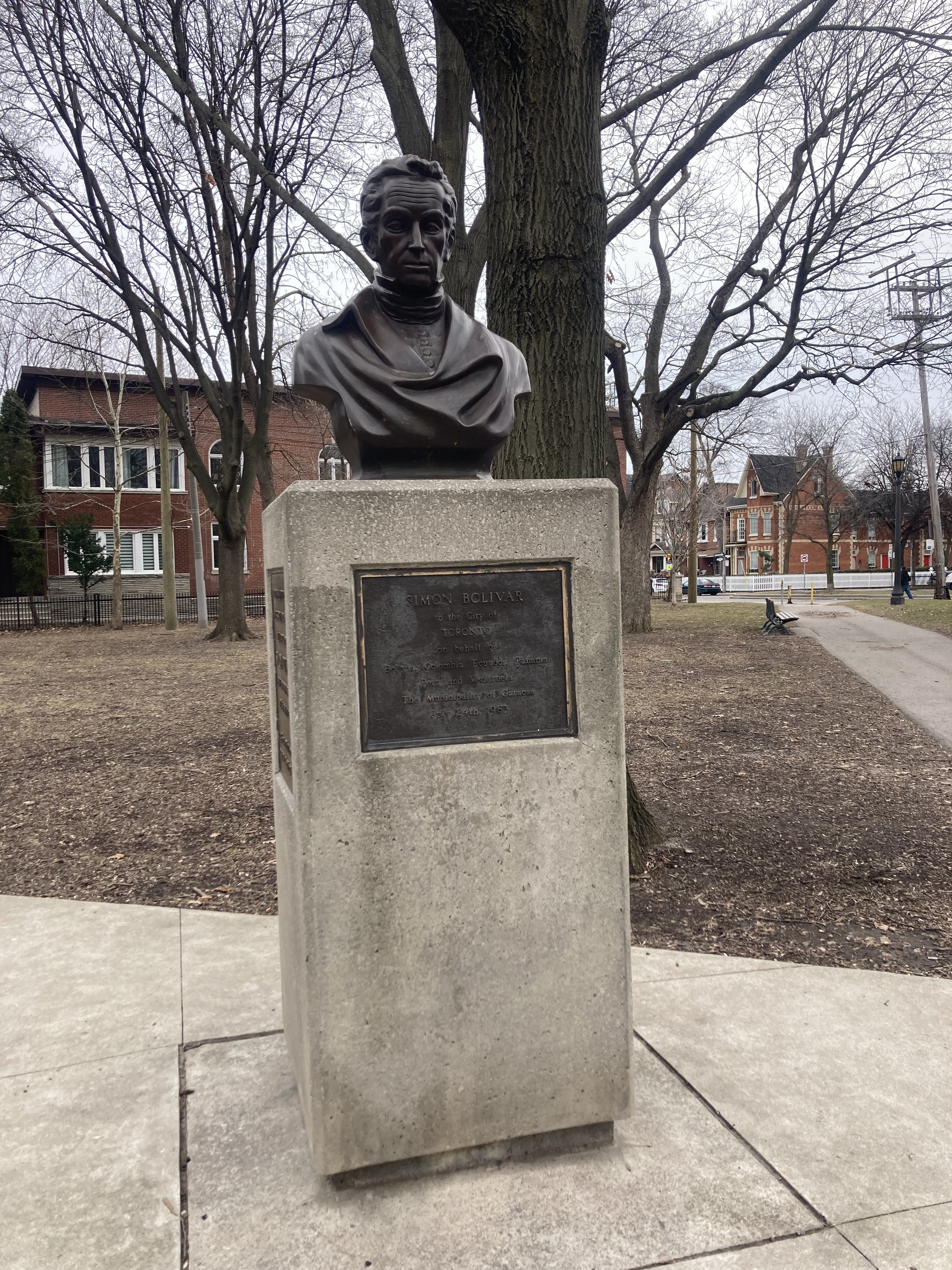
Simón Bolívar bust, March 2026

In the northwest corner of the park there is a small reminder of the diverse Latin American character of other nearby neighbourhoods: a bust of Simón Bolívar which was donated to the city. This is where the Trinity Bellwoods Farmers' Market is located.

The park also hosts the annual art exhibition and market called Queen West Art Crawl.

It was originally chosen as the site of the G20 protests on June 26–27, 2010, but Toronto Police announced that they would use the area north of Queen's Park instead after local residents opposed the use of Trinity Bellwoods Park as a protest site.

=== 2021 clearing ===
In 2021, police cleared between 20 and 25 people who had been camping in the park.

== References in culture ==
Treble Charger wrote a song called Trinity Bellwoods, which was on their debut album NC17.

Toronto-based artist organization Humble Empire created the "Live In Bellwoods" series of videos featuring acoustic performances by popular artists living in or visiting Toronto. Each video highlights a different area of the park. Dave Monks from Tokyo Police Club, Luke Lalonde from Born Ruffians, and Chris White of Bellewoods were among the performers to be featured in the series.

== See also ==
- 2010 G-20 Toronto summit
- Crawford Street Bridge
