= Dan Druff (musician) =

American musician (born 1969)

Background information
- Birth name: Daniel James Irving
- Born: April 16, 1969 (age 55); New Haven, Connecticut, United States
- Genres: Rock
- Occupations: Technician; musician
- Instruments: Vocals; guitar; bass guitar
- Years active: 1988–present

Daniel James Irving (born April 16, 1969), better known as Dan Druff, is a guitar technician and musician who has worked with various artists in the studio and on tours, including Queens of the Stone Age, Guns N' Roses, Tool, Sum 41, Wolfmother, The Distillers, Coheed and Cambria, Monster Magnet and Madrugada. Druff is best known for his work with Queens of the Stone Age, which saw him work as a technician on three studio albums and join the band for a stint as touring bassist. He has worked as a studio technician on over 30 albums throughout his career.

== Career ==
Druff was born in New Haven, Connecticut and formed the St. Louis rock band Shagnaps in 1991. The band consisted of Druff as guitarist and co-vocalist along with bassist and co-vocalist Otis London and drummer Tony Mack. The Shagnaps broke up in 1995, but played reunion shows in 1996 and 1998. Druff had a brief stint with the punk band Butt Trumpet in 1995, before abruptly quitting the band onstage at a New York City concert. He appears in the band's video for the song "I'm Ugly and I Don't Know Why."

Druff started working with Queens of the Stone Age on their 2000 album Rated R and subsequently worked on their follow-up album Songs for the Deaf. In early 2004, bassist Nick Oliveri was fired by frontman Josh Homme and replaced by Druff. Druff worked on the band's following album, Lullabies to Paralyze, as a technician and appears in the "Little Sister" promotional video. He left Queens of the Stone Age in 2005 and later toured as a tech with Guns N' Roses on the Chinese Democracy Tour. In 2019, Druff worked as technician on Tool's Fear Inoculum album.

== Discography ==
Year	Artist	Title	Notes
1988	The Essence	A Mirage	Additional percussion
1996	d.b.s / Anti-Flag	North America Sucks!!	Backing vocals
1996	Anti-Flag	Die For The Government	Backing vocals
1998	Anti-Flag	Their System Doesn't Work For You	Backing vocals
1999	Chlorine	Primer	Guitar technician
2000	Queens of the Stone Age	Rated R	Guitar technician
2000	Monster Magnet	God Says No	Guitar technician
2000	Treble Charger	Wide Awake Bored	Assistant producer, guitar technician
2000	The Drowners	Is There Something On Your Mind?	Guitar technician
2001	Betty Blowtorch	Are You Man Enough?	Guitar technician
2001	40 Below Summer	Invitation To The Dance	Guitar technician
2001	The Benjamins	The Art Of Disappointment	Guitar technician
2001	Backyard Burial	The $2 Pe-ep	Performer (bass)
2002	Queens of the Stone Age	Songs for the Deaf	Guitar technician
2002	Treble Charger	Detox	Guitar technician
2002	Project 86	Truthless Heroes	Guitar technician
2003	The Distillers	Coral Fang	Guitar technician
2003	Powerman 5000	Transform	Guitar technician
2003	Element Eighty	Element Eighty	Guitar technician
2004	Burning Brides	Leave No Ashes	Guitar technician
2004	Monster Magnet	Monolithic Baby!	Performer (guitar), guitar technician
2004	Sum 41	Chuck	Guitar technician
2005	Madrugada	The Deep End	Guitar technician
2005	No Warning	Suffer, Survive	Guitar technician
2005	Sunnshine	No More Forever	Guitar technician
2005	Queens of the Stone Age	Lullabies to Paralyze	Guitar technician
2009	Wolfmother	Cosmic Egg	Guitar technician
2010	Coheed and Cambria	Year of the Black Rainbow	Guitar technician
2018	Dizzy Reed	Rock 'n Roll Ain't Easy	Performer (bass)
2019	Tool	Fear Inoculum	Guitar technician
2021	Chevelle	NIRATIAS	Guitar technician
