= NC17 (album) =

Studio album by Treble Charger
- Released: July 4, 1994
- Genres: Pop punk, indie rock
- Length: 59:37
- Label: Smokin' Worm
- Producers: Rob Sanzo, Treble Charger

Treble Charger chronology
NC17 (1994)	Self Title (1995)

Professional ratings
Review scores
Source	Rating
AllMusic	2/5 stars

NC17 (stylized in all lowercase) is the debut album by Treble Charger released on July 4, 1994. It was re-released by Sonic Unyon in 1997. "Red" from this album was also re-recorded for Maybe It's Me. The album is named after the band's original name, before they changed it due to copyright issues with an American band having the same name.

Treble Charger also recorded a demo tape named NC17, with a number of tracks found on the album, but also included an extra titled "Barcelona Chair". The artwork features the Smokin' Worm of Smokin' Worm records.

== Track listing ==
All songs written by Treble Charger.

1. "10th Grade Love" – 4:04
2. "In Your Way" – 3:37
3. "Trinity Bellwoods" – 4:31
4. "Dress" – 3:28
5. "Cubicle" – 4:41
6. "Popcorn Chicken" – 1:37
7. "Red" – 5:10
8. "Soaker" – 3:54
9. "Deception Made Simple" – 4:18
10. "Pilot Light" – 4:44
11. "Hint" – 19:00

== Credits ==
- Treble Charger - producer, artwork
  - Greig Nori - guitar, vocals
  - Bill Priddle - guitar, vocals
  - Rosie Martin - bass guitar, backing vocals
  - Morris Palter - drums, percussion
- Joao Carvalho - mastering
- Chris Jackson - artwork
- Rob Sanzo - producer, engineer
