= Self Title =

EP by Treble Charger
- Released: 1995
- Recorded: February 1995
- Genre: Pop punk, indie rock
- Length: 32:37
- Label: Sonic Unyon/ViK.

Treble Charger chronology
NC17 (1994)	Self Title (1995)	Maybe It's Me (1997)

Professional ratings
Review scores
Source	Rating
AllMusic	1.5/5 stars

Self Title (styled as self=title) is Treble Charger's EP originally released in February 1995. It was re-released by RCA on November 26, 1996, and BMG in 1997. The album was nominated for "Best Alternative Album" at the 1997 Juno Awards.

This disk featured CD-ROM contents, called "screen zine" in the track listing, profiling some of the band's friends and colleagues in the Canadian indie rock scene of the era (including Change of Heart, Hayden, the Inbreds, Thrush Hermit, By Divine Right and Shortfall.)

== Track listing ==
All songs written by Treble Charger.

1. "Morale" – 4:37
2. "Even Grable" – 4:10
3. "Case In Fact" – 4:13
4. "Cleric's Hip" – 1:56
5. "Sick Friend Called" – 3:27
6. "Motor Control" – 3:18
7. "Slight" – 4:56
8. "Disclaimer" – 3:12 *
9. "Half Down" – 2:48 *

There were 3 different releases of this cd, one was self-released, one released by Sonic Unyon and one released by RCA for the American market. The self-released copy had a data track at the start (which is the screen zine part of it), the Sonic Unyon one had the zines, but it wasn't visible to cd players. The RCA release included the tracks Disclaimer and Half Down (tracks 8 and 9) and the bands on the zines were changed to American bands.

== Credits ==
- Treble Charger – Mixing
  - Greig Nori – Guitar, Vocals
  - Bill Priddle – Guitar, Vocals
  - Rosie Martin – Bass guitar, Vocals (background)
  - Morris Palter – drums
- Jon Auer – Mixing
- Joao Carvalho – Mastering
- Chris Jackson – Artwork
- Ted Jensen – Mastering
- Brian Malouf – Mixing
- Brad Nelson – Mixing Assistant
- Rob Sanzo – Engineer
