= Morris Palter =

Canadian musician

Morris Palter is a Canadian drummer/percussionist who specializes in contemporary/classical chamber and solo percussion music. He also plays novelty ragtime xylophone and drum kit, and is also a composer, and university professor who was a founding member of the band Treble Charger.

== Biography ==
Palter was one of the first members of Treble Charger, along with Greig Nori, Rosie Martin and Bill Priddle. Though the band was originally named nc-17, an American band of the same name threatened to sue, hence "Treble Charger" was born. The group's first hit "Red" was written by Bill Priddle and was also re-recorded for their 1997 album Maybe It's Me. The second version seemed to be more of a success but wasn't posted as one because their first album nc-17 was also re-released that same year.

Palter was fired from the group in 1996 and moved to the Netherlands, where he studied percussion at the Royal Conservatory of The Hague. He then earned a Doctorate degree under Steven Schick at the University of California, San Diego.

Palter has toured throughout North America, Europe, and Asia, performing in a wide variety of festivals and concert recitals, including the Disney Hall in Los Angeles, the Lincoln Center, and Carnegie Hall's Weill Recital Hall under Pierre Boulez. He also appeared on CBC Radio's Sounds Like Canada show. He has been a guest lecturer at numerous universities worldwide, including the University of Birmingham in the UK, Stanford University, University of Wisconsin–Milwaukee, and the University of Virginia, among others.

Palter also founded the Speak Easy Duo, which has appeared internationally at various festivals. He also co-founded NOISE (San Diego New Music), and was a member of the percussion group redfish bluefish from 1999 to 2005.

Palter is also an active composer. His A Midsummer Night's Dream was performed at the Old Globe Theater. Morris provided all the percussion music for the Shakespeare Center of Los Angeles' production of King Henry IV starring Tom Hanks in 2018. He was also the featured instrumental soloist with La Jolla Playhouse's A Scottish Play. Palter has also made recordings for Off Broadway and Broadway shows. He has also recorded percussion-based works for Tzadik, Mode, Innova, and New World Records.

Palter was a Lecturer in Music at UCSD in 2006/07 where he earned a Doctorate of Musical Arts in 2005, and was an Assistant and Associate Professor in Music at the University of Alaska Fairbanks (2007–2017). Morris is currently a Professor of Music at the University of Arizona.
