= Harbord Street Bridge =

Bridge in Toronto, Canada

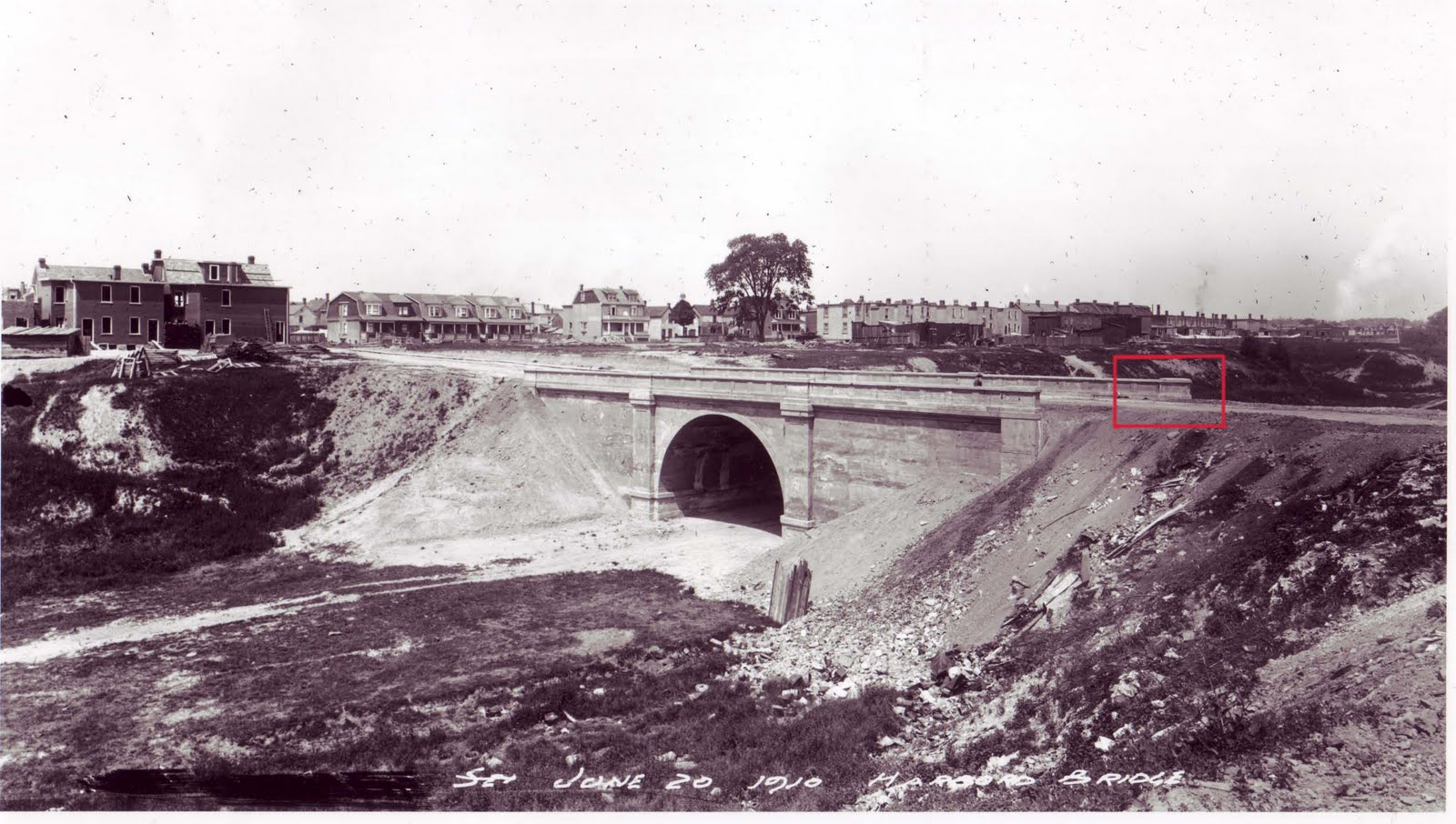
- Harbord Bridge nearing completion, 1910
- Coordinates: 43°39′35″N 79°25′07″W
- Carries: single vehicle lanes for both directions
- Crosses: Garrison Creek (Bickford Park Ravine)
- Locale: Toronto, Ontario, Canada

Characteristics
- Design: arch bridge
- Total length: 10.5 m (34 ft 5 in)
- Width: 16.45 m (54.0 ft)
- Clearance above: unlimited
- Clearance below: 7 m (23 ft)

History
- Opened: 1914

Statistics
- Daily traffic: Harbord Street

Location
- Interactive map of Harbord Street Bridge

The Harbord Street Bridge is one of two known bridges that once spanned Harbord Street over Garrison Creek in Toronto and was partially buried intact in the 20th century (the other is the Crawford Street Bridge to the south).

The Harbord Street Bridge was a single-span reinforced concrete arch bridge built from 1909 to 1914 that carried Harbord over Garrison Creek in the area known today as Palmerston–Little Italy and for the extension of Beatrice Street to Bloor Street West. The bridge was built to allow the better means for people in the new residential development to move around the neighbourhood. The bridge crossed over the creek from Montrose Avenue to Grace Street. The bridge bisects the Bickford Park neighbourhood with Bickford Park to the north side and Harbord Park (Art Eggleton Park) to the south. Infilling of the area around the bridge began in 1917 and both sides were filled by 1930, likely due to sewage being dumped into the creek following residential development, but the balustrades on either side were still exposed. Today, only the northern balustrade remains visible. Like the Crawford Street Bridge, it was not torn down but buried. The bridge, the valley, and the creek have all now disappeared underground.

== See also ==
- Crawford Street Bridge
