= Autopilot Off (EP) =

EP by Autopilot Off
- Released: April 23, 2002
- Recorded: Los Angeles, 2002 and Metalworks Studios in Mississauga, Ontario
- Genre: Pop punk, punk rock
- Length: 13:12
- Label: Island
- Producer: Greig Nori

Autopilot Off chronology
Looking Up (2000)	Autopilot Off (2002)	Regenerator (2003)

Professional ratings
Review scores
Source	Rating
Allmusic	2/5 stars

Autopilot Off is the first major label EP by the punk band Autopilot Off. It is the band's first release with the label Island Records and was produced by the then Sum 41 manager and producer Greig Nori. This EP was also the first release by the band to feature their signature symbol—the split-in-half padlock—on the album cover art, a design element that would subsequently appear on all of their future albums' cover art.

== Track listing ==
1. "Long Way to Fall" - 02:39
2. "Indebted" - 02:29
3. "Nothing Frequency" - 02:39
4. "Exit Signs" - 02:43
5. "Wide Awake" - 03:12
