= Crawford Street Bridge =

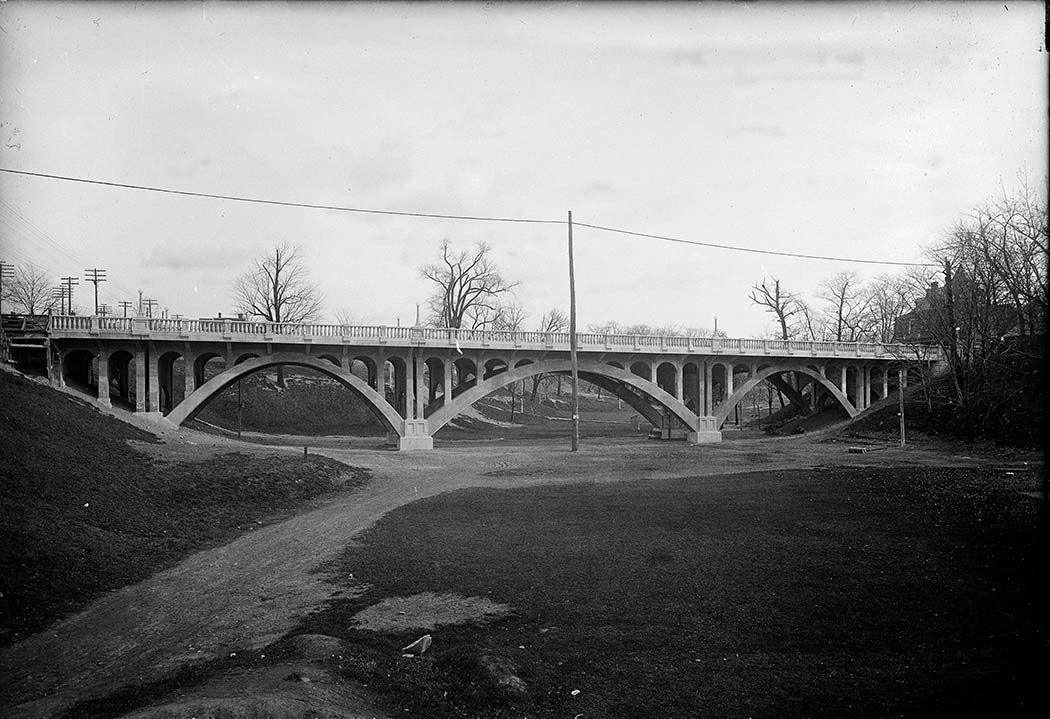
- Coordinates: 43°38′57″N 79°24′54″W
- Carries: single vehicle lanes for both directions
- Crosses: Garrison Creek
- Locale: Toronto, Ontario, Canada

Characteristics
- Design: triple span arch bridge
- Total length: 52 metres (170 feet) - approx.
- Clearance above: unlimited

History
- Opened: 1915

Location
- Interactive map of Crawford Street Bridge

Crawford Street Bridge was one of two known bridges that once spanned over Garrison Creek valley in Toronto, Ontario, Canada. The creek had been buried by the 1920s and the bridge was buried intact. The bridge shared design features with the larger Prince Edward Viaduct.

The Crawford Bridge was a triple span arch bridge built in 1914 to 1915 to replace an early wooden bridge (1884) that spanned Garrison Creek in the area known today as Trinity-Bellwoods. The bridge's design was influenced by Public Works Commissioner Roland Caldwell Harris with a more pleasing structure for the public. The bridge was built to allow residents in the new residential development along Crawford Street to cross over the valley over from north of Lobb Avenue to the south of Dundas Street West.

In the 1960s the valley on either side was filled in with earth dug from building the Bloor subway. It was the last of few bridges that spanned Garrison Creek to be removed, most before the 1940s. The actual bridge was not torn down, but rather buried with only the railings and lamp posts removed. The City of Toronto government performed maintenance work in 2004 that narrowed the roadbed and rebuilt sidewalks on both sides. Foaming grout was added to fill the voids of the bridge with hope for future restoration of the entire bridge. Today there are no visible signs of the bridge being present other than plaques and sidewalk markers added in 2008 by the City of Toronto. Once rolling landscape, houses and flat Trinity Bellwoods Park now surround the bridge.

== See also ==
- Harbord Street Bridge
