= Mitch Bowden =

- Origin: Canada
- Genres: Indie rock

Mitch Bowden is a Canadian indie rock musician associated principally with the bands Chore, Don Vail, and The Priddle Concern.

In 2007, he also played with Broken Social Scene, as well as some of Kevin Drew's solo shows to support Spirit If..., to fill in for Bill Priddle after Priddle broke his collarbone.

Mitch supplied music for the game series The Several Journeys of Reemus.
