= Maybe It's Me =

Studio album by Treble Charger
- Released: May 13, 1997 (Canada); July 29, 1997 (United States)
- Recorded: ViK. Recordings
- Genres: Alternative rock, indie rock
- Length: 49:58
- Labels: Smokin' Worm (Canada); 74321-47023-2; ViK. Recordings (Canada); RCA (US)
- Producer: Lou Giordano

Treble Charger chronology
Self Title (1995)	Maybe It's Me (1997)	Wide Awake Bored (2000)

Professional ratings
Review scores
Source	Rating
AllMusic	4.5/5 stars

Maybe It's Me is the third studio album by Canadian rock band Treble Charger. The album was released in 1997. The album featured three hit singles: "Friend of Mine", "How She Died" and a re-recorded version of "Red" (from NC17).

The album was a major breakthrough for Treble Charger, and was their most well received album yet. The album was certified Gold in Canada, with sales of over 50,000 copies.

A live version of the song "Scatterbrain" was featured on MuchMusic's live compilation album, Much at Edgefest '99.

== Track listing ==
All songs written by Treble Charger.

1. "Friend of Mine" – 3:46
2. "How She Died" – 3:18
3. "Stupid Thing to Say" – 3:09
4. "Kareen" – 4:22
5. "Red" – 4:41
6. "Fade" – 4:06
7. "Ever She Flows" – 3:54
8. "Forever Knowing" – 4:13
9. "Mercury Smile" – 3:37
10. "Christ is on the Lawn" – 4:23
11. "Scatterbrain" – 3:50
12. "Takes Me Down" – 3:18
13. "Left Feeling Odd" – 3:16

== Credits ==
- Treble Charger – Art Direction
  - Greig Nori – Synthesizer, Guitar, Vocals, Slide Guitar, Farfisa Organ
  - Rosie Martin – Synthesizer, Bass guitar, Piano, Vocals (background), Farfisa Organ, Pedals
  - Bill Priddle – Guitar, Vocals, Vocals (background), Mellotron
  - Mike Levesque – drums for tracks 1–6, 8, 11–12
  - Morris Palter – Drums for tracks 7, 9, 10 and 13
  - Trevor MacGregor – Drums (only for the music videos. Credited as a member of the band in the booklet/insert.)
- Colleen Allen – Saxophone (tenor)
- Stephen Donald – Trombone
- Matthew Ellard – Assistant Engineer
- Lou Giordano – Producer, guitar, mixing
- Jed Hackett – Assistant Engineer
- Helios – Art Direction, Design, Photography, Illustrations
- Jack Hersca – Assistant Engineer
- Ted Jensen – Mastering
- Pete Karam – Assistant Engineer
- Tom Lord-Alge – Mixing
- Sarah McElcheran – Trumpet
- Michael Murphy – Art Direction
- Dave Tedesco – Assistant Engineer
- Roberto Toledo – Assistant Engineer

== In pop culture ==
- "How She Died" was featured on Halloween, an episode of Buffy the Vampire Slayer.
