= Don Vail =

Canadian musical group

- Origin: Dunnville, Ontario, Canada
- Genre: Indie rock
- Years active: 2006–present
- Members: Mitch Bowden; Chris Bell; David Dunham; Bill Priddle

Don Vail is a Canadian indie rock band, formed by Mitch Bowden and David Dunham, formerly of the band Chore, and Bill Priddle, formerly of Treble Charger and Broken Social Scene.

== History ==
Bowden and Dunham continued working together following the breakup of Chore, but the band didn't take shape for a number of years. Bowden later met Priddle, who joined to play guitar.

The band recorded its self-titled debut album in 2006 and 2007 with producer Jordon Zadorozny. The album was released independently in 2009. The album's sound was a combination of grunge, punk and pop. Some of the songs had been written for Chore, but not recorded by that band before it broke up.

In 2016, the band released its sophomore album, Fades. The album appeared on the campus and community radio charts that year.

In 2019, the band released its third album, Stand of Tide.

== Band members ==
- Mitch Bowden - vocals, guitar (2006–present)
- Bill Priddle - lead guitar (2006–present)
- Chris Bell - bass (2006–2010)
- David Dunham - drums, percussion (2006–present)
- Luke Bentham - vocals (2016)
- Kori Pop - vocals (2016)
- Bob Wilcox - vocals (2016)

== Discography ==
- Don Vail (2009)
- Fades (2016)
- Stand of Tide (2019)

== See also ==
- Music of Canada
- Canadian rock
- List of Canadian musicians
- List of bands from Canada
- Category:Canadian musical groups
