= The Drowners (Swedish band) =

Swedish indie pop band

'The Drowners' are a Swedish indie powerpop band. Formed in July 1993, their first album "Destroyer", was released in February 1996. In 1999 the band relocated to Los Angeles to record an album with producer Matt Hyde in Sound City Studios. The subsequent album, Is There Something On Your Mind?, had an indie single of the same name in 2000, for which the band is best known for.

== Members ==
- Bass – Jonas Bergqvist
- Drums – Andreas Persson
- Guitar – Leif Rehnström, Mikael Sundqvist
- Vocals, Piano – Magnus Vikström

== Discography ==
- Happy New Year (single-09) A West Side Fabrication (SWE)
- My Candle (single-08) A West Side Fabrication (SWE)
- Beautiful Escape (tribute-08) Burning Sky Records (USA)
- Cease To Be (album-07) Listening Post (USA)
- Cease To Be Japan Version (album-07) 1977 Records (JAPAN)
- Muted To A Whisper USA Version (album-03) Listening Post (USA)
- Muted To A Whisper (album-02) Morphine Lane Records (SWE)
- Best Of Beginnings (single-02) Morphine Lane Records (SWE)
- He Was Fab (tribute-02) Jealousy Records (USA)
- Jennifer (single-02) Morphine Lane Records (SWE)
- On The Radio (single-01) Morphine Lane Records (SWE)
- 'Think Of Me': Boys & Girls (soundtrack-00) Ark 21 Records (USA)
- Is There Something On Your Mind? (album-00) Wind Up Records (USA)
- Is There Something On Your Mind? (single-00) Wind Up Records (USA)
- What Comes Naturally (single-98) A West Side Fabrication (SWE)
- Going For Gold (compilation-97) A West Side Fabrication (SWE)
- 'Fake R&R Personality' : Välkommen Till Festen (soundtrack-97) Startracks (SWE)
- Fake R&R Personality (single-97) A West Side Fabrication (SWE)
- World Record Player (album-97) A West Side Fabrication (SWE)
- Summer Break My Fall (single-97) A West Side Fabrication (SWE)
- '21' : West Side United (compilation-97) A West Side Fabrication (SWE)
- Bumperstar (single-96) A West Side Fabrication (SWE)
- 'Upside' : Give Ear (compilation-96) A West Side Fabrication (SWE)
- Stupid Way (single-96) A West Side Fabrication (SWE)
- Destroyer (album-96) A West Side Fabrication (SWE)
- Teenager (single-96) A West Side Fabrication (SWE)
- 'That Door' : The 23 Enigma (compilation-95) A West Side Fabrication (SWE)
- 'Destroyer' : Were All Part Of A Family (compilation-94) A West Side Fabrication (SWE)
