= Make a Sound =

Studio album by Autopilot Off
- Released: April 13, 2004
- Recorded: 2003–04
- Studios: Ocean (Burbank, CA); Glenwood Place (Burbank, CA); Metal Works Recording, Mastering & DVD (Mississauga, ON); Nada Recording (New Windsor, NY); Larrabee East (Hollywood, CA)
- Genres: Punk rock, pop-punk
- Length: 38:34
- Labels: Island; B0001899-02
- Producers: Greig Nori, Chris Johnson, John Naclerio

Autopilot Off chronology
Regenerator (2003)	Make a Sound (2004)

Singles from Make a Sound
- 1. "What I Want" Released: March 23, 2004

Professional ratings
Review scores
Source	Rating
AbsolutePunk.net	(86%)
Allmusic	2.5/5 stars
Blender	2/5 stars

Make a Sound is the second album and major label debut by American rock band Autopilot Off. It was produced by then-Sum 41 producer and manager Greig Nori.

== Release ==
In February 2004, it was announced for release in two months' time. On February 23, 2004, "What I Want" was posted online; it was released on a split single with Fall Out Boy on March 23, 2004. The music video for "What I Want" was posted online on four days later. Make a Sound was released on April 13 through Island Records. In April and May, the group supported Rufio on their headlining US tour, which included an appearance at the Skate and Surf Festival. They played a handful of dates with Authority Zero and Pennywise. On May 18, 2004, the band appeared on The Late Late Show. They then embarked on a US headlining tour with Riddlin' Kids and Bayside. Autopilot Off appeared on IMX on June 16, 2004. Prior to a Japanese tour with the Offspring, drummer Phil Robinson got married; Ben Lythberg of Snapcase filled in his role. Upon returning to the US, they played shows with Squad Five-O, theStart and A Second Chance, and appeared at the Just Play Games Festival. They performed across the US on the Projekt Revolution tour until September 2004.

== Track listing ==
All tracks are written by Chris Johnson, Chris Hughes, Rob Kucharek and Phil Robinson, except where noted.

Tracks
No.	Title	Length
1.	"Make a Sound"	3:44
2.	"Clockwork" (Autopilot Off, Greig Nori)	3:06
3.	"Blind Truth" (Autopilot Off, Tim Armstrong)	2:38
4.	"I Know You're Waiting"	2:50
5.	"The 12th Day"	4:26
6.	"Voice in the Dark"	3:08
7.	"What I Want" (Autopilot Off, Tim Armstrong)	2:45
8.	"Blessed by a Nightmare"	3:48
9.	"Divine Intervention"	2:50
10.	"Chromatic Fades"	2:59
11.	"Byron Black"	3:16
12.	"The Cicada's Song"	3:04
13.	"Raise Your Rifles (Bonus Track)"	2:37
Total length:		38:34

== Personnel ==
Autopilot Off

- Chris Johnson – lead vocals, rhythm guitar
- Chris Hughes – lead guitar, backing vocals
- Rob Kucharek – bass guitar, backing vocals
- Phil Robinson – drums

Artwork

- Rob Kucharek – Design, layout design
- Andrew Forgash – Photography

Additional musicians

- Tim Armstrong – Co-writing on "Blind Truth" & "What I Want"
- Michael "Elvis" Baskette – Additional Guitars
- Ed Krautner – Piano
- Greig Nori – Co-writing on "Clockwork"

Production

- Greig Nori, Chris Johnson, & John Naclerio – Producers
- Zach Blackstone, C.J. Buscaglia, Steve Chahley, & Damien Shannon – Assistants
- Ed Krautner, Roger Lian – Digital Editing
- Matt Hyde – Drum Engineering
- Gersh & Joe Nicholson – Drum Technician
- Michael "Elvis" Baskette, Femio Hernández, Matt Hyde, Ed Krautner, & John Naclerio, – Engineers
- Justin Huth & Stephen Looker – Guitar Technician
- Howie Weinberg – Mastering at Masterdisk, NYC
- Randy Staub – Mixing on tracks: 1, 5, 9–12
- Tom Lord-Alge – Mixing on tracks: 2–4, 6–8
- Andrew Huggins – Recording Administration

== Charts ==
Chart (2004)	Peak position
US Billboard 200	119
Top Heatseekers	2
Top Internet Albums	119

== Other versions ==
The Japanese version of Make a Sound includes a bonus track titled "Raise Your Rifles". There is also a limited edition print of the album, that, as well as the Japanese bonus track, includes two additional songs. These two songs are their covers of "Rejoice" by U2 and "Shovel" by Quicksand, both of which were originally featured on their 2003 EP, Regenerator.

== Use in media ==
"Make A Sound" appears in the soundtrack for Burnout 3: Takedown, "Chromatic Fades" in NASCAR Thunder 2004, "Clockwork" in NHL 2004 (however is misspelled as "Clockworks") and SSX 3, and "What I Want" in Test Drive: Eve of Destruction and Cars.
