= Looking Up (Autopilot Off album) =

Studio album by Autopilot Off
- Released: June 27, 2000
- Genre: Punk rock, pop punk, melodic hardcore, skate punk
- Length: 36:21
- Label: Fast Music; Fueled By Ramen
- Producer: Jeff DaBella and Cooter

Autopilot Off chronology
| Slick Shoes/Cooter Split (2000) | Looking Up (2000) | Autopilot Off (2002) |

Professional ratings
Review scores
| Source | Rating |
|---|---|
| Allmusic | 3.5/5 stars |
| StarPulse | 3.5/5 stars |

Looking Up is the first studio album by the punk rock band Autopilot Off. It was released in 2000 on Fueled By Ramen. The album is the band's first and last release on this label, as they were later signed by Island Records.

The album was first released in 1999 under their original name Cooter through Fast Music, and was later re-released under their final name Autopilot Off.

== Track listing ==
1. "Missing the Innocence" - 2:47
2. "Full House" - 3:39
3. "Looking Up" - 2:23
4. "Bite My Nails" - 2:24
5. "Dawn To Dusk" - 2:56
6. "Underrated" - 3:16
7. "Walk On Water" - 3:34
8. "Friday Mourning" - 3:01
9. "Pivot" - 2:05
10. "Something For Everyone" - 3:30
11. "Pin The Tail On The Donkey" - 3:27
12. "Sleeptight" - 3:19
