= Garrison Creek (Ontario) =

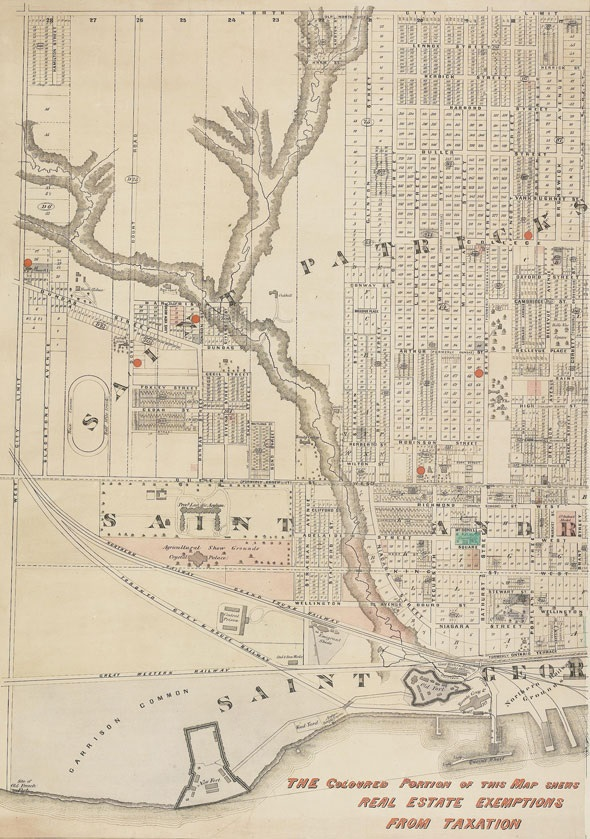
- Lower course of Garrison Creek

Location
- Country: Canada
- Province: Ontario
- City: Toronto

Physical characteristics
- Source: Humewood Reach
  - location: Dufferin Street and St. Clair Avenue West, Toronto, Ontario, Canada
- Mouth: Toronto Bay
  - location: Old Fort York, Toronto, Ontario, Canada
- Length: 7.7 km (4.8 mi)
- Discharge
  - location: Foot of Bathurst Street at Lake Ontario

Garrison Creek was a short stream about 7.7 kilometres (4.8 miles) long that flowed southeast into the west side of Toronto Harbour in Ontario, Canada. It has been largely covered over and filled in, but geographical traces of the creek can still be found, including the natural amphitheatre known as Christie Pits and the off-leash dog "bowl" of Trinity Bellwoods Park. The name "Garrison Creek" was used because Fort York was built near the creek mouth. Volunteers lead popular tours of the course of the old watershed.

== History ==
Garrison Creek was one of a number of small natural watercourses on the site of the current city of Toronto. Starting in the 1870s, the stream was diverted into underground sewers under city streets and the original course was filled in with soil. By 1920, the stream was entirely diverted into the sewer system. There are many artifacts of the Creek's existence, including buried bridges along Harbord Street and Crawford Street south of Dundas Street. The unusual courses of Niagara Street (north of Fort York) and Vaughan Road (St. Clair and Bathurst area) indicate that they were once trails following the banks of the creek.

Locations over the buried watercourse flooded during strong rainstorms in 2013.

In 2013 particularly strong rainstorms caused the storm sewers that replaced Garrison Creek to flood, at Christie Pits, Trinity Bellwoods Park, and a railway underpass at King Street and Atlantic Avenue. Both Christie Pits and Trinity Bellwoods Park are over the original Garrison Creek Ravine, while the King and Atlantic intersection is over the course of Asylum Stream, a tributary that ran from just northwest of Fort York to Lisgar Street and Queen Street West near the former Provincial Asylum.

== Course ==
The stream had two sources, one north of St. Clair Avenue, near Humewood Public School, and the other northwest of the present-day Dufferin Street and St. Clair Avenue intersection. The main course travels due south to south of King Street, where it turned to the southeast and emptied into Toronto Bay at the present-day intersection of Bathurst Street and Lake Shore Boulevard.

Tributaries along the creek included:

- Springmount Stream
- London Stream
- Dewson Stream
- Asylum Stream
- Stafford Stream
- Denison Creek (which had its own tributaries):
  - Brock Stream
  - Havelock Stream
  - Moutray Stream

== See also ==
- Fort York
- List of Ontario rivers
