= Autopilot Off =

American punk rock band

- Also known as: Cooter
- Origin: Orange County, New York, USA
- Genres: Punk rock, pop-punk, melodic hardcore, skate punk
- Years active: 1996–2005, 2011–present
- Labels: Island, Fastmusic, Fueled By Ramen
- Members: Chris Hughes; Chris Johnson; Rob Kucharek; Phil Robinson

Autopilot Off is a punk rock band from Orange County, New York composed of Chris Hughes (guitar), Chris Johnson (guitar/vocals), Phil Robinson (drums) and Rob Kucharek (bass).

== History ==
Autopilot Off formed in 1996 under the name Cooter. They slowly gained popularity by doing live shows throughout the 90s while sharing the stage with more popular bands such as MxPx, Goldfinger, Sum 41, Yellowcard and H_{2}O. Cooter released a split with Slick Shoes on May 23, 2000. They eventually recorded their first full-length album, Looking Up. In 2000 the band was involved in a bitter lawsuit with the Mississippi punk rock band The Cooters, who own the trademark to the name Cooter. The New York band changed their name to Autopilot Off in April 2001, and settled out of court in 2002. However, Autopilot Off's record label Fastmusic, took the lawsuit all the way to Federal Court and lost to the Mississippi band. In December 2001, Autopilot Off signed with major label Island Records. After this they released their eponymous EP of April 23, 2002. They supported Sum 41 on their headlining tour of the east coast of the US and Canada. In November and December 2002, the band supported the Ataris on their headlining US tour. The band left the tour a week before it ended to start work on their next album, which they started to record in March 2003. The band went on "The Made Tour," which ran from June to August; they played alongside Further Seems Forever, the Movielife, and Anberlin. The stint featured an appearance at Hellfest. In August, the band released the Regenerator EP, which consisted of cover versions of songs by Quicksand, Bad Religion, U2, and Guns n' Wankers. In September and November, the band played a handful of Northeast and Midwest shows with Lost City Angels.

In 2004, under their new name Autopilot Off, they released their major debut album, Make a Sound. This included the single "What I Want", which was co-written by Rancid's Tim Armstrong. The track “Chromatic Fades” was also featured in the video game NASCAR Thunder 2004. "Make a Sound" appeared on Burnout 3: Takedown, "What I Want" appeared in Test Drive Eve of Destruction and Cars: The Video Game, and “Clockwork” appeared in the video game soundtracks for “NHL 2004” and SSX3.

=== Indefinite hiatus (2005–2010) ===
On August 26, 2005, the band decided to go on an indefinite hiatus and released the following statement on their official website:

We've decided to take an indefinite break from Autopilot Off. It has been nearly 10 years since the band started, and it has been full speed ahead for the majority of that time. We have all decided to take some time for our lives outside of the band. We are all still the best of friends. In addition to this we decided a few months back to leave our home of 4 years at Island Records. We apologize for leaving you all hanging for so long. Thank you so much for all the support and friendships that you all have given to us over the years. We could never have done it without you.

Since then, Chris Hughes has gone on to become a business manager (accountant) in the music industry.

Bassist Rob Kucharek has gone on to open American Icon Screen Printing which is an apparel screen printing company that serves many bands and the majority of the BMX industry on the East Coast.

=== Reunion (2011) ===
In May 2011, a Facebook page titled "Autopilot Off (Official)" was created, with an image of the band's name and the words "TwoThousandEleven" being uploaded soon after. This had led to speculation of a possible reunion, nearly six years after they announced their hiatus.

On June 20, 2011 an update was posted on the band's Facebook page confirming that they were working on new material. "Our plan is to record our songs in batches and release them for free download as they are completed. This way, we can share new music with you in the most expedient fashion. When we have recorded enough material, we will compile some or all of it into a new album."

An update posted on August 17, 2012 to Facebook confirmed that the band were set to begin recording again, officially ending their seven-year hiatus.

As of December 2013, the band's Facebook page had had no updates since August 2012 relating to the band. It was unclear whether the progress of the new songs was ongoing or at a standstill. However, on April 2, 2014, it was announced via their Facebook page that two brand new songs entitled "Alcologic" and "When I Was Young" respectively, were being made available for free digital download.

The post read:

"The wait is over. Here is a link to two new songs that we are releasing for free download. This has been an ambitious project for us, encompassing the past several months. We handled all aspects of production ourselves, working on weekends and whenever our collective personal schedules would permit. It has taken a long time to generate anything finished, but it has been worth it to us to do our songs our way. We hope you enjoy them, and hope that we can complete more in the future." -Chris J, Chris H, Rob, and Phil

On April 3 it was announced via their Facebook page that the download attempts had exceeded the free download limit through the host website to the songs, and a direct link was provided alternatively for the download.

With the release of these songs, Autopilot Off has confirmed that although band activity is minimal, they intend to continue playing music together in the future.

On April 9, 2015, Autopilot Off released their third new track entitled "Lining Them Up".

On September 17, 2024, Autopilot Off announced their collaboration with Enjoy the Ride Records to release "Alcologic," "When I Was Young," and "Lining Them Up" on vinyl as The Encore EP, marking the first physical release of these songs. Make a Sound was later announced to also be receiving a vinyl re-release, as a celebration for the album's 20th anniversary.

== Band members ==
- Chris Johnson – lead vocals, rhythm guitar
- Chris Hughes – lead guitar
- Rob Kucharek – bass guitar, backing vocals
- Phil Robinson – drums

== Discography ==
=== Albums ===
- Looking Up (2000)
- Make a Sound (2004) No. 119 US

=== EPs ===
- All Bets Off (1997)
- Slick Shoes / Cooter Split (2000)
- Autopilot Off (EP, 2002)
- Regenerator (2003, consisted of 4 cover songs from the band's favorite artists.)
- The Encore EP (2024)

=== Game appearances ===
- "Make a Sound" was featured on Burnout 3: Takedown.
- "Clockwork" featured on both SSX3 and NHL 2004.
- "Chromatic Fades" was featured in NASCAR Thunder 2004.
- "What I Want" was featured in Cars, based on the 2006 film of the same name.
- "Long Way to Fall" and "Indebted" were featured in Project Gotham Racing 2.
- "What I Want" was featured in Test Drive: Eve of Destruction.
- "Missing the Innocence" was featured in Whirl Tour.

=== Video/film appearances ===
- "The 12th Day" was featured in NoA: The Two Continents Savage Bane and Zero Dark Thirty.
- "Nothing Frequency" was featured in the film Stealing Harvard.

=== Compilation appearances ===
- "Something for Everyone" was track No. 8 on the Orange County's New Punk compilation.
- "Mrs Brown, You've Got a Lovely Daughter" (Herman's Hermits cover) was track No. 1 on the Oldies But Goodies cover compilation.
- "Raise Your Rifles" was included on the Daredevil soundtrack, Daredevil: The Album.
- "I'm Thinking" was released with many other punk bands on the Rock Against Bush compilation.
- "Clockwork" was included in the Projekt Revolution Sample CD that was received for joining LPU 4.0 and the album Hard to Get, Volume 1: An Island Rarities Compilation
- "Long Way to Fall" was featured on the first Atticus: ...Dragging the Lake compilation.
- "Nothing Frequency" was included on the 2002 Warped Tour Compilation and also appeared on the Stealing Harvard soundtrack.
- A demo version of "Indebted" was included in the track No. 25 on the 2001 Warped Tour Compilation.
- "Long Way to Fall" was included on the Osiris Shoes Aftermath Tour 2002 Sampler.
- "Full House" was included on the Serial Killer Compilation (Fearless Records) listed under the band's prior name of "Cooter".
