= Raising the Fawn =

Canadian indie rock band

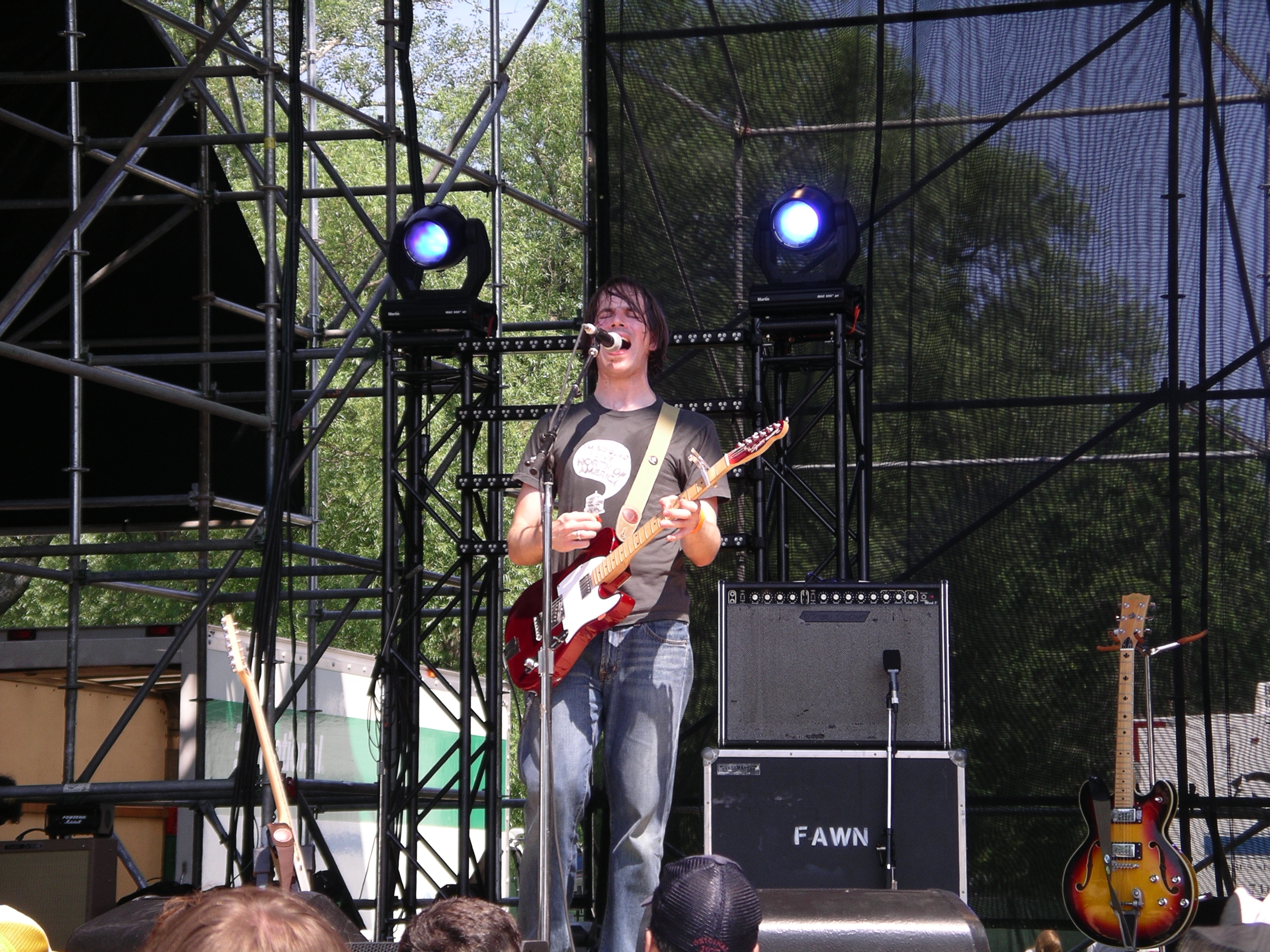
- Raising the Fawn, June 2006

Background information
- Origin: Toronto, Ontario, Canada
- Genres: Indie rock
- Years active: 1997–present
- Members: John Crossingham; Scott Remila; Dylan Green

Raising the Fawn is a Canadian indie rock band, with its roots in Toronto. The band is composed of John Crossingham (who is also a member of Broken Social Scene), Scott Remila and Dylan Green (who are both members of City and Colour).

== History ==
Raising the Fawn was formed by Crossingham, in 1997 as a solo recording project, but soon was joined by Remilla. They released their self-titled first album in 2001. The group grew to four members with the addition of singer Julie Booth and drummer Jon Drew.

The EP By the Warmth of Your Flame came out in 2003. 2004's The North Sea, recorded two years earlier, contained lively, rhythmic arrangements. By the time it was released, Booth and Drew had left, and Green was the band's drummer.

In 2006, the now three-member band released The Maginot Line. The album was recorded near Kingston, Ontario, and was a combination of indie rock and shoegazing music with heavy percussion. That year the band toured Canada to promote the album.

== Discography ==
- Raising the Fawn (2001)
- By the Warmth of Your Flame (2003)
- The North Sea (2004)
  1. "The News"
  2. "Home"
  3. "Gwendolyn"
  4. "July 23"
  5. "The North Sea"
  6. "Top to Bottom"
  7. "Drownded"
  8. "ETA"
- The Maginot Line (2006)
  1. "Pyotr"
  2. "Carbon Paper"
  3. "Maginot Line"
  4. "Ilyich"
  5. "Christmastime in the Fields"
  6. "Matador"
  7. "Nocturne No. 1"
  8. "Cloak and the Veil"
  9. "Gold and Red"
  10. "Until It Starts Again"
  11. "Nocturne No. 2"
- Sleight of Hand (2007)
