= Trevor MacGregor =

Canadian musician (born 1975)

- Born: 9 May 1975 (age 49)
- Genres: Punk rock, indie rock
- Occupation(s): Drummer, musician, songwriter
- Instrument(s): Drums, percussion, guitar, piano
- Years active: 1997–present
- Labels: RCA Records, Rake Records
- Website: www.trevormacgregor.com

Trevor MacGregor (born May 9, 1975) is a Canadian musician, best known as the last and longest-standing drummer in the punk band Treble Charger. He currently resides in Toronto, Ontario, and composes music for film and television.

== Career ==
Growing up in Calgary, MacGregor began playing drums at age 10 and later began playing guitar and receiving training in jazz and classical musics. After playing in local bands such as the Fricks and Wagbeard, MacGregor joined Treble Charger in 1997. He replaced the band's original drummer, Morris Palter, in time for touring behind the Maybe It's Me album. The band enjoyed moderate success thereafter, including touring with Foo Fighters and The Smashing Pumpkins. He remained with the group until their 2006 breakup.

MacGregor also took part in two recording sessions with the Canadian skate punk band SNFU in 2000 and 2003. These recordings featured on their ninth studio album, In the Meantime and In Between Time. He has done extensive work as a session drummer.
