= Greig Nori =

Canadian record producer

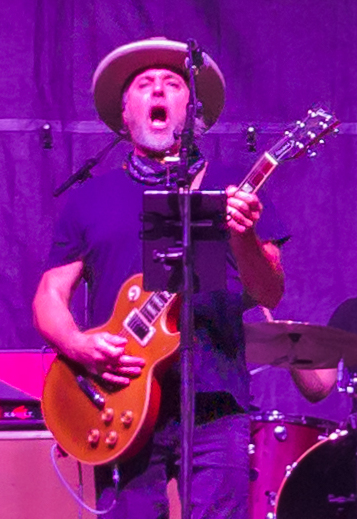
- Nori performing with Treble Charger in 2024

Background information
- Born: Greig Andrew Nori; Sault Ste. Marie, Ontario, Canada
- Genres: Indie rock; pop-punk; punk rock; alternative rock
- Occupations: Producer; musician; singer; manager
- Instruments: Vocals; guitar
- Years active: 1991–present
- Member of: Treble Charger

Greig Andrew Nori is a Canadian record producer and musician from Sault Ste. Marie, Ontario, and is the frontman, co-lead vocalist and guitarist of the pop-punk band Treble Charger. In the late 1990s, he began working as a producer with Sum 41 and was their in-house producer and manager until 2004. In 2007, Nori went back to the studio to produce for the pop punk bands Cauterize and Hedley, for their albums Disguises and Famous Last Words, respectively.

== Career ==
Nori saw Sum 41 in concert at Jonopalooza in 1996 and convinced the group to lose their original lead vocalist, placing Deryck Whibley on vocals.

Nori formed the music artist management company Bunk Rock Entertainment. Through the 2000s, Nori would host the MuchMusic reality show Disband and produce music for Canadian groups Hedley and Marianas Trench. Nori would manage the band The New Cities for a few months, producing their first album, Lost in City Lights (2009).

As of 2024, Nori was a self-employed recording studio manager and engineer at Algoma Conservatory of Music, the largest music organization in Sault Ste. Marie and the second largest not-for-profit music education center in Ontario. The organization suspended all projects involving Nori following the allegations made by Whibley while it conducted an internal review of his allegations.

== Sexual abuse allegations ==
Sum 41 vocalist Deryck Whibley accused Nori of grooming and sexual abuse in his memoir Walking Disaster, published in 2024. Nori allegedly grabbed and kissed him. When Whibley said he rejected these advances, Nori allegedly got "psychologically and verbally abusive."

Nori has denied the allegations and has retained a defamation lawyer. Nori wrote in a statement through the Toronto Star that the accusation that he initiated the relationship was false. Nori continued that when their relationship began, Whibley and he were both adults, and that "the accusation that I pressured Whibley to continue the relationship by accusing him of homophobia is false. Ultimately the relationship simply faded out. Consensually. Our business relationship continued." In January 2025, Nori filed a lawsuit against Whibley, claiming libel and "breach of confidence, intrusion upon seclusion, wrongful disclosure of private facts, and placing the plaintiff in a false light." Whibley counter-sued, claiming $3 million in damages for "defamation and placing the plaintiff in a false light".

== Discography ==
=== Treble Charger ===
Arrangements, songwriting, vocals and guitar throughout all albums:

- nc17 (1994)
- self=title (1995)
- Maybe It's Me (1997)
- Wide Awake Bored (2000)
- Detox (2002)

=== Others ===
Year	Album title	Band	Record label	Credits
2000	Half Hour of Power	Sum 41	Aquarius/Big Rig	Co-producer
2001	All Killer No Filler	Sum 41	Island	Manager, guitar on "Handle This" and "Pain for Pleasure", backing vocals on "Motivation", co-writer
2002	Autopilot Off	Autopilot Off	Island	Producer
2002	Does This Look Infected?	Sum 41	Island/Mercury	Producer, manager
2003	Skull Ring	Iggy Pop	Virgin	Co-producer on "Little Know It All" (feat. Sum 41)
2004	Make a Sound	Autopilot Off	Island	Co-producer, co-writer "Clockwork"
2004	Chuck	Sum 41	Island/Mercury	Producer, manager
2004	Suffer, Survive	No Warning	Machine Shop	Co-producer, manager
2007	Disguises	Cauterize	High 4	Co-producer
2007	Famous Last Words	Hedley	Universal Music Canada	Producer, mixing
2008	World Time Bomb	One Second 2 Late	Universal Music Canada	Co-producer
2009	Masterpiece Theatre	Marianas Trench	604	Co-producer
2009	Lost in City Lights	The New Cities	Sony Music Canada	Producer
2012	Somewhere Between Free Men and Slaves	Organ Thieves	MapleMusic Recordings	Producer
2012	Collide and Conquer	Hunter Valentine	Megaforce Records	Producer
