= Treble Charger =

Canadian rock band

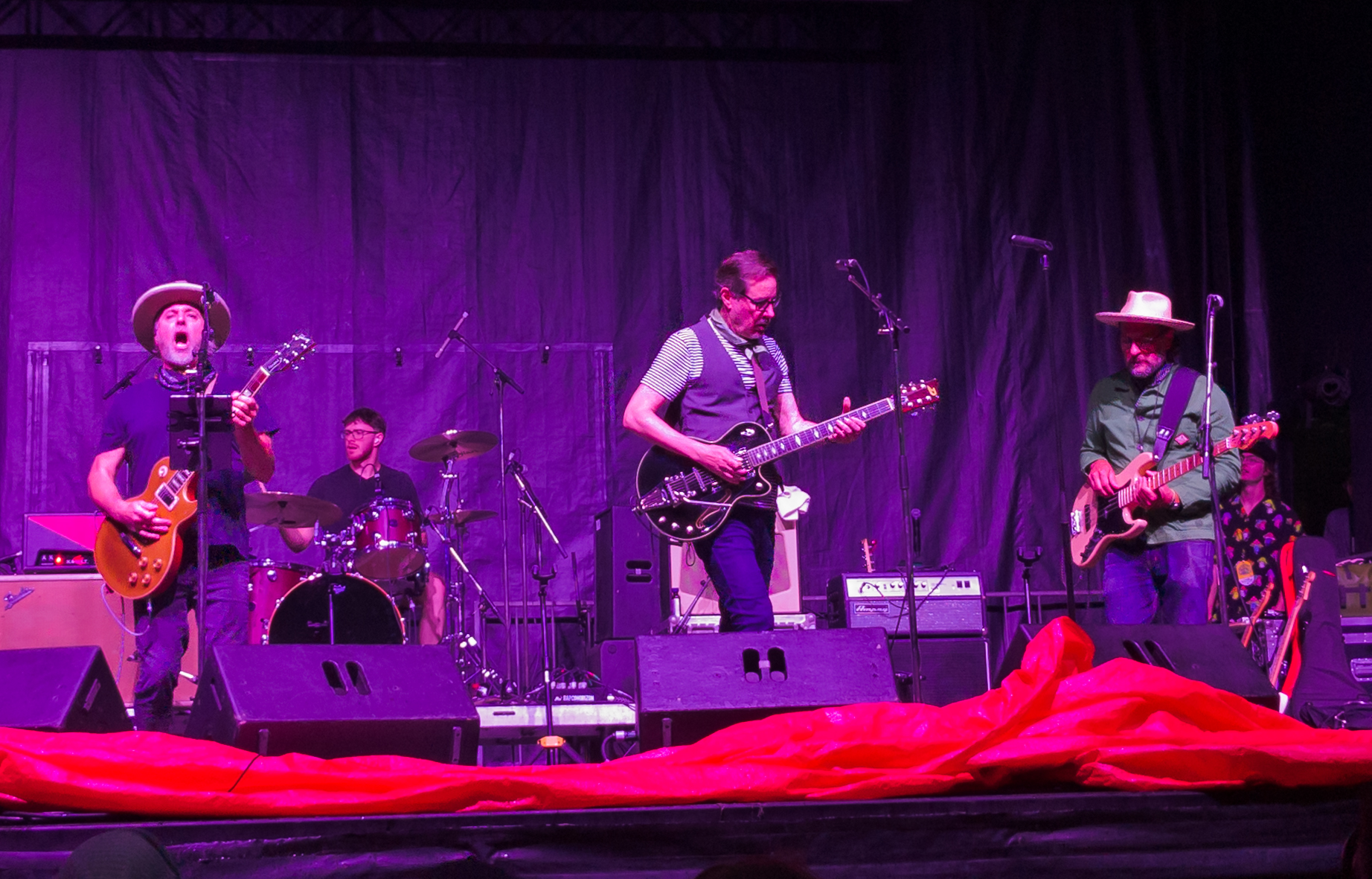
- Treble Charger performing in 2024

Background information
- Origin: Sault Ste. Marie, Ontario, Canada
- Genres: Indie rock; pop-punk; punk rock; alternative rock
- Years active: 1992–2006, 2012–present
- Labels: ViK; Nettwerk; RCA; Sonic Unyon; Smokin' Worm
- Members: Greig Nori; Bill Priddle; Richard Mulligan; Rosie Martin
- Past members: Morris Palter; Trevor MacGregor

Treble Charger is a Canadian rock band formed in 1992 in Sault Ste. Marie, Ontario, consisting of vocalist and guitarist Greig Nori, vocalist and guitarist Bill Priddle, bassist Rosie Martin and drummer Richard Mulligan. They began with a melodic indie rock style but evolved into more of a pop punk band after signing to a major label in 1997. They disbanded in 2006 and reunited in 2012. Between 1996 and 2016, Treble Charger was among the Top 150 selling Canadian artists in Canada.

== History ==
=== Early years (1992–1996) ===
Originally from Sault Ste. Marie, Ontario, the band consisted of Nori, Priddle, Rosie Martin and Morris Palter and was named NC-17 (after the movie rating) until 1994 when an American band with the same name threatened to sue. They adopted the name Treble Charger but named their debut album NC17. NC17 was released independently at first by Smokin' Worm in 1994, but it was a hit on campus radio, MuchMusic, and CFNY when it was re-released by Sonic Unyon Records in 1997.

In 1995, the band released Self Title, which included a CD-ROM track promoting 30 of Treble Charger's favourite Canadian indie bands, including The Inbreds, Change of Heart, By Divine Right, Hayden and Thrush Hermit.

In 1996, Treble Charger signed with RCA Records in the United States.

=== Shift to pop punk (1997–2006) ===
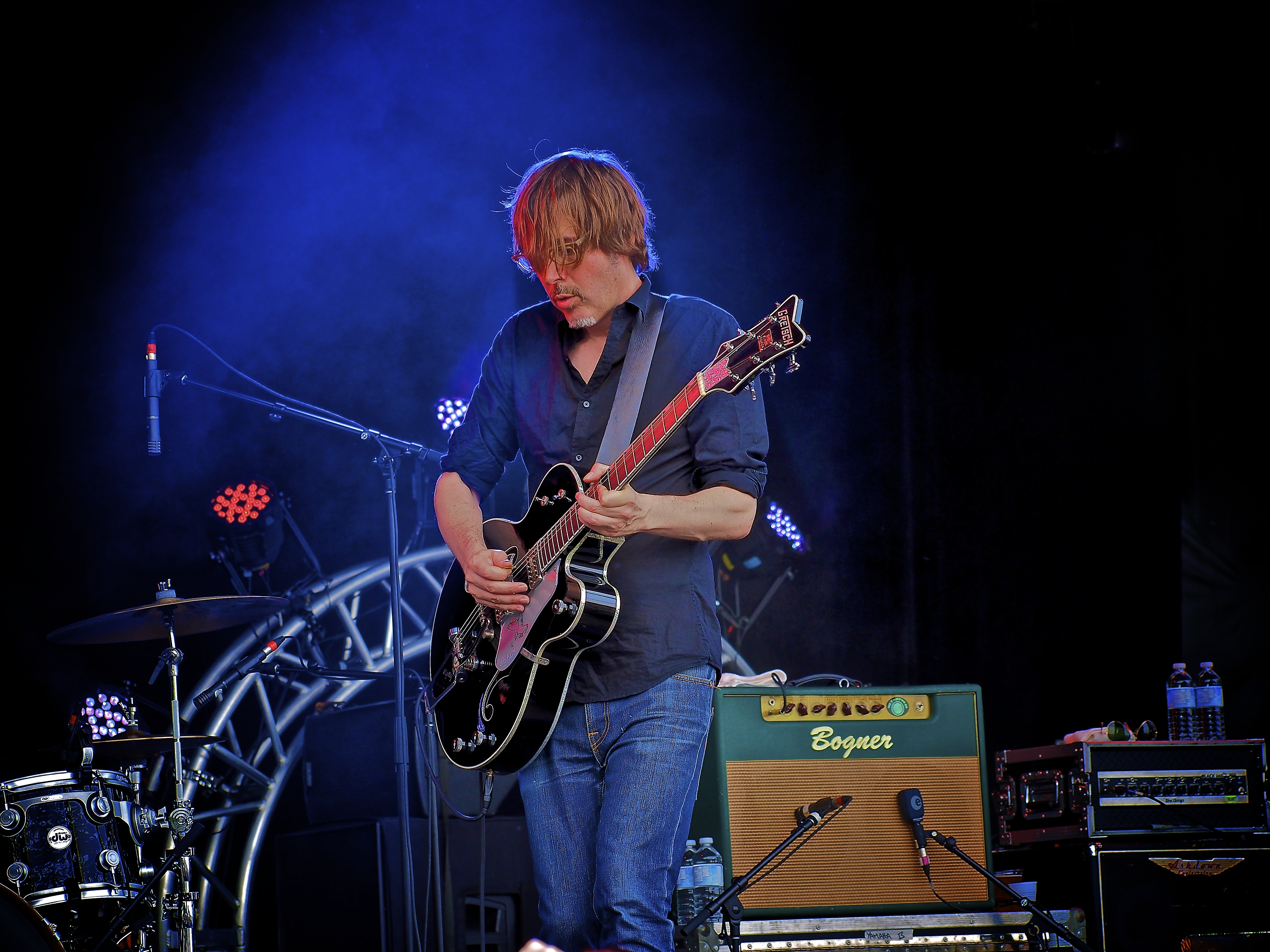
Guitarist Bill Priddle

1997's Maybe It's Me was the band's major label debut. Palter recorded drums for only a few tracks, and, after Nori considered recording the rest of the drums himself, session drummer Mike Levesque stepped in. The album featured a more polished, commercial sound than the band's earlier albums, and launched the hit "Friend of Mine". Soon afterward, Trevor MacGregor joined as the band's drummer. That lineup, along with several of their songs from this album, were also featured in the 1999 film Mr. Music. The band played the role of an 'undiscovered' indie band that gets discovered and helps to turn fictional Tone Records around from its slump. Wide Awake Bored, released in 2000, completed the band's evolution to a pop-punk style. This album also featured the hit singles "American Psycho" and "Brand New Low".

In 2001, Treble Charger performed at the Snow Jam festival in Halifax. In 2002, the band released Detox, featuring hit single "Hundred Million" and "Don't Believe It All".

Priddle, identified with Treble Charger's early indie rock direction rather than the later pop-punk, left the band in 2003. Initially, it was said he was taking a break from the group, but it later came out the departure was permanent, and Nori had asked him to leave sooner than Priddle had intended.

Kelly Osbourne guitarist Devin Bronson filled in for Priddle for the rest of the Detox tour. Priddle continued his collaborations with Broken Social Scene and is a member of his new band The Priddle Concern.

By this time, their work with and the success of their proteges Sum 41, whom Nori produced, had started to eclipse Treble Charger's own career. In late 2004, it was reported that Treble Charger itself was on hiatus, but an animated version of the group, including Priddle, would appear, with Sum 41, on The Comedy Network series Kevin Spencer.

However, a message posted on July 20, 2004, on their official website said they were continuing to record and the band was still together. But on September 1, 2005, Nori said in an interview:

"Thanks for all the amazing support you have given us. It seems like we're bigger now then we have ever been. I only wish more people had caught on to our music sooner so that we could have had an easier time at being a band. I'm not saying it's over yet but I am saying that right now I need to focus on other things. Maybe in a while I will get the urge to write a new TC album but right now my heart's not in it. Thanks for enjoying our music."

The hits "American Psycho" and "Brand New Low" were featured in EA Sports hockey game NHL 2002 and "Hundred Million" was used in NHL 2003 and Splashdown: Rides Gone Wild. EA also used "Wear Me Down" and "Business" from the Wide Awake Bored album in Triple Play 2002. "American Psycho" was used in promotional advertisements for the direct-to-video movie American Pie: Band Camp and featured in the movie Dude, Where's My Car?

On February 3, 2006, Nori disbanded Treble Charger, ending their 14-year career.

=== Post-breakup activity (2006–2011) ===
Nori has stopped managing Canadian band Sum 41, although he now manages other bands. He is currently a "musical guru" for the Canadian reality show disBAND (since renamed Much Discovered) on MuchMusic. Priddle pursues a solo career in Toronto, and released a solo album in 2008 with his new band The Priddle Concern. MacGregor currently writes music for TV and film. Palter went on to pursue degrees in contemporary percussion performance and continues to perform solo and chamber music of contemporary composers all over the world.

Treble Charger was one of the inaugural inductees into the Sault Ste. Marie Walk of Fame on September 30, 2006, during the grand opening weekend of the Steelback Centre, the city's new sports and entertainment arena.

Nori produced Organ Thieves' first full-length studio album Somewhere Between Free Men and Slaves, which was recorded between 2010–2012 and released on April 3, 2012.

=== Reunion and upcoming sixth studio album (2012–present) ===
On January 15, 2012, a Twitter account was opened for the band, with the opening tweet saying "Wow - it's been a while. Might be time to knock the dust off...", which led to speculations about the band reuniting, also following Nori's tweet "Thinking I should probably call Bill, and maybe pick up some new guitar strings, hmmmm." On January 20, 2012, it was confirmed that the band will reunite (without Martin and MacGregor) and has announced plans to play a reunion show at The Indie Awards in Toronto as part of Canadian Music Week. Another show was confirmed for March 21, 2012, in Toronto, with the band playing alongside Organ Thieves. The band played three more Canadian festival shows, in June, July and November.

In 2013, the band played one headlining show on July 12, in Windsor, Ontario, with support from The Trews and Neverending White Lights.

Nori and Priddle entered the studio to record new music in September 2014. During a 2018 headlining of the Rotaryfest, the band mentioned the possibility of a new album.

The band held a VIP fundraiser on March 7, 2024, to raise money for the Algoma University music program. On July 6, 2024, Treble Charger played the Big Shiny Saturday concert in Toronto, on a bill with Bif Naked, I Mother Earth, Headstones, and The Tea Party.

=== Nori abuse allegations ===
On October 7, 2024, Sum 41's Deryck Whibley released his memoir Walking Disaster, in which he accused Nori of sexual and verbal abuse during his time as the band's manager. Nori allegedly grabbed and kissed Whibley, and when he rejected those advances, Nori became psychologically and verbally abusive. Nori denied the allegations, insisting that although the relationship began when Whibley was a teenager, it was in fact consensual.

== Band members ==
=== Current ===
- Greig Nori – lead vocals, guitar (1992–2006, 2012–present)
- Bill Priddle – guitar, co-lead vocals (1992–2003, 2012–present)
- Frank Deresti – bass (2024–present)

=== Former ===
- Jason Pierce – drums (2012–2013)
- Morris Palter – drums, percussion (1992–1997)
- Mike Levesque – drums, percussion (1997)
- Trevor MacGregor – drums, percussion (1997–2006)
- Devin Bronson – guitar, backing vocals (2003–2004)
- Rosie Martin – bass (1992–2006)
- David Peredun – drums (2024)

=== Touring / session ===
- Dave McMillan – bass (2012)
- Darcy Yates – bass (2012–2018)

== Discography ==
=== Studio albums ===
Title	Album details	Peak chart positions	Certifications
Title	Album details	CAN	Certifications
NC17	Released: July 4, 1994; Label: Smokin' Worm; Formats: CD	—	
Self Title	Released: 1995; Label: Sonic Unyon; Formats: CD	—	
Maybe It's Me	Released: May 13, 1997; Label: Smokin' Worm; Formats: CD	77	MC: Gold
Wide Awake Bored	Released: July 25, 2000; Label: Nettwerk; Formats: CD	9	MC: Platinum
Detox	Released: August 20, 2002; Label: ViK.; Formats: CD	10	MC: Gold

=== Singles ===
Year	Single	Peak chart positions			Album
Year	Single	CAN	CAN Rock/Alt.	US Alt.	Album
1994	"Red"	—	—	—	NC17
1994	"10th Grade Love"	—	—	—	NC17
1995	"Even Grable"	—	6	—	Self Title
1996	"Morale"	41	16	—	Self Title
1996	"Sick Friend Called"	—	—	—	Self Title
1997	"Friend of Mine"	41	9	—	Maybe It's Me
1997	"How She Died"	—	19	—	Maybe It's Me
1997	"Red (re-recorded)"	—	20	48	Maybe It's Me
1998	"Ever She Flows"	—	—	—	Maybe It's Me
2000	"American Psycho"	—	4	—	Wide Awake Bored
2001	"Brand New Low"	—	×	—	Wide Awake Bored
2001	"Business"	—	54	—	Wide Awake Bored
2002	"Hundred Million"	79	×	49	Detox
2002	"Don't Believe It All"	—	×	—	Detox
2003	"Ideal Waste of Time"	—	×	—	Detox
"—" denotes releases that did not chart. "×" denotes periods where charts did not exist or were not archived.

== See also ==
- Canadian rock
- Music of Canada
