= Bill Priddle =

Canadian rock musician (born 1963)

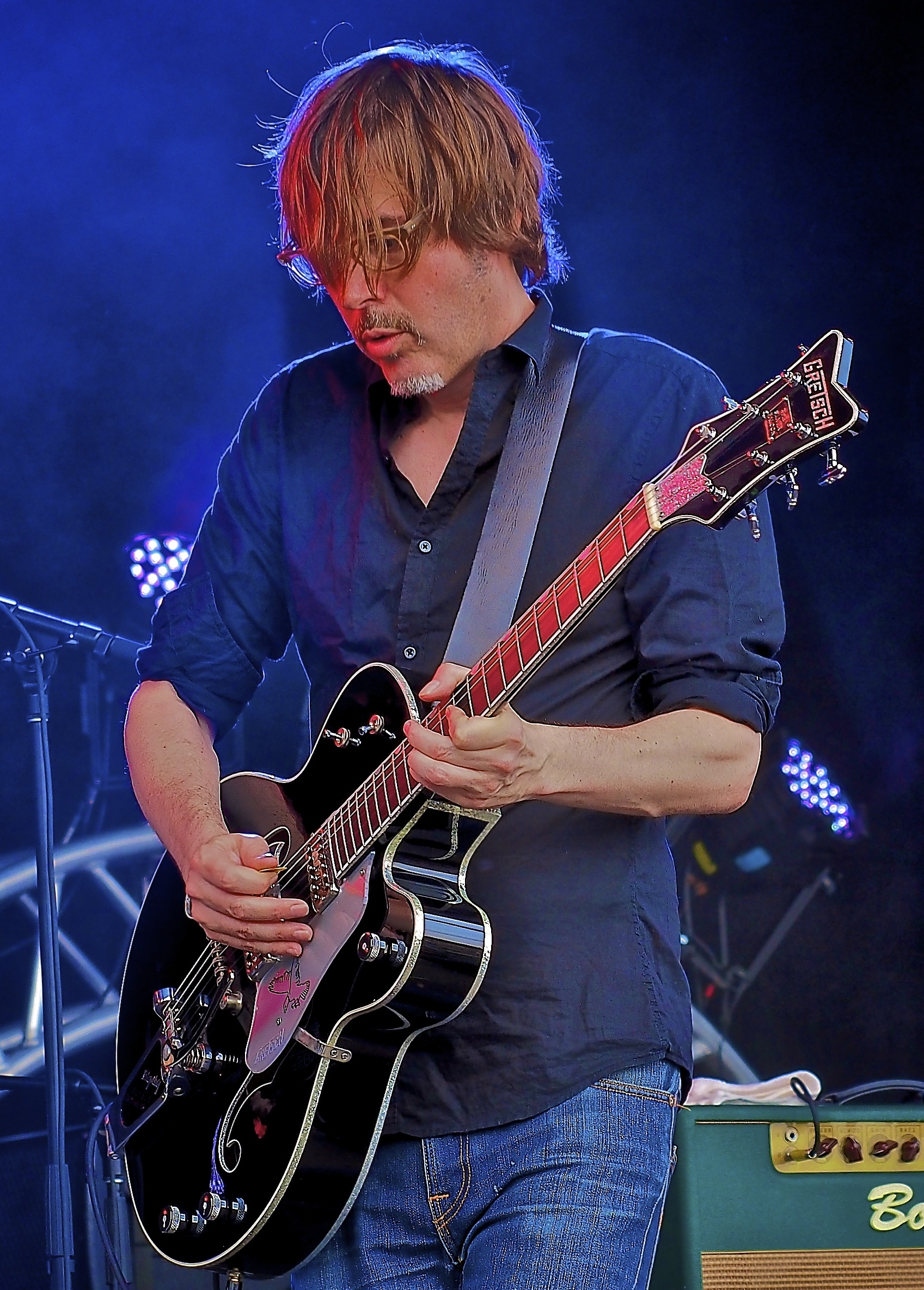
- Priddle performing in 2012

Background information
- Born: May 2, 1963 (age 63)
- Genres: Indie rock, pop-punk, alternative rock, experimental rock, art rock, shoegazing
- Occupation: Musician
- Instruments: Vocals, guitar
- Years active: 1992–present

Bill Priddle (born May 2, 1963) is a Canadian indie rock musician, currently working as co-lead vocalist and guitarist in the band Treble Charger. He has also been a member of Broken Social Scene, Don Vail, and The Priddle Concern.

In 1992, he formed Treble Charger in Sault Ste. Marie, Ontario, with Greig Nori, Rosie Martin, and Morris Palter. The band released five studio albums, before Priddle departed in 2003. The band disbanded in 2006, and reformed in 2012 with Priddle rejoining.

Priddle released an album May 6, 2008, under the name The Priddle Concern.
