= Canadian hardcore punk =

Music genre and subculture

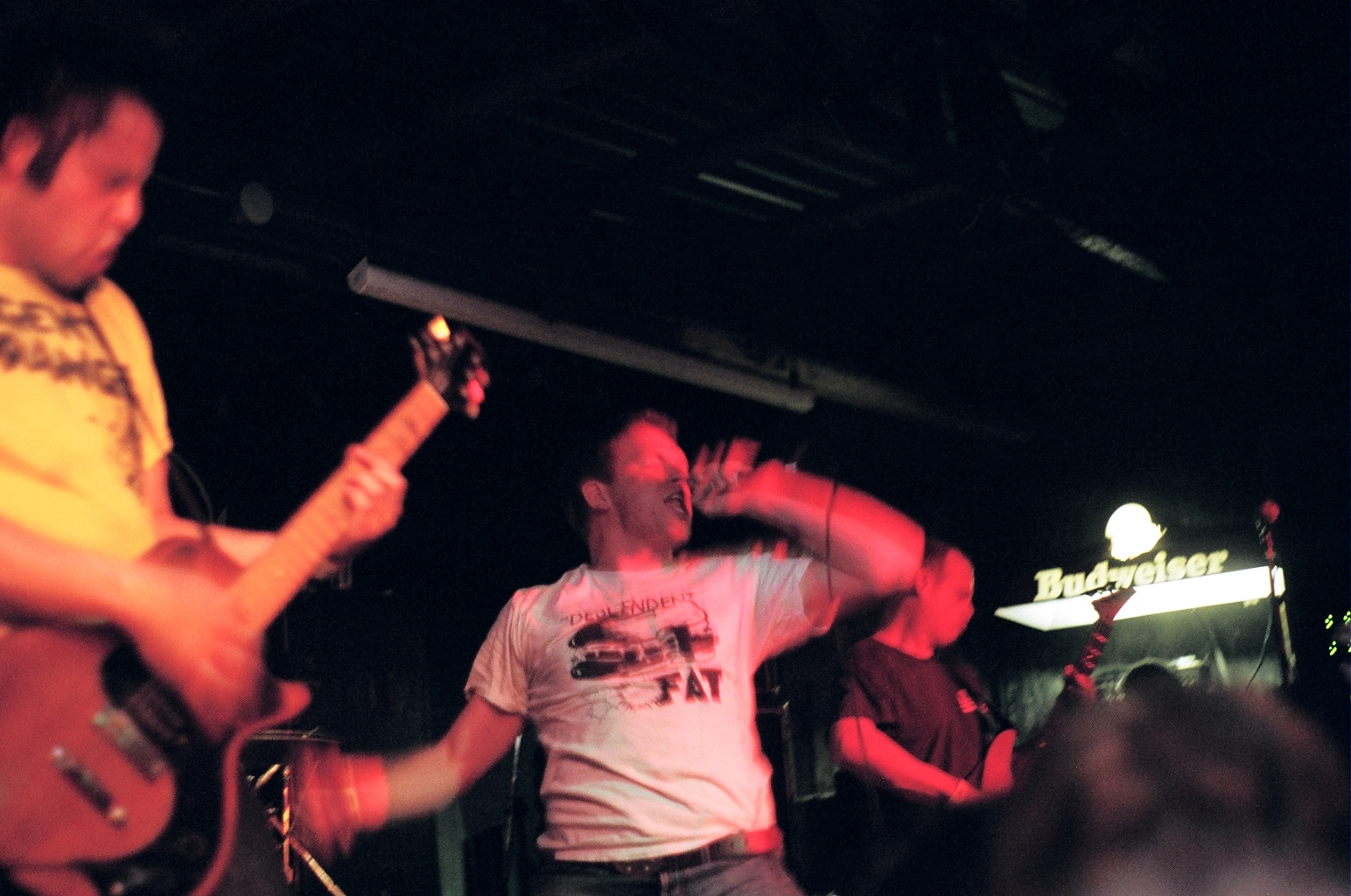
Toronto band Career Suicide onstage

Canadian hardcore punk originated in the early 1980s. It was harder, faster, and heavier than the Canadian punk rock that preceded it. Hardcore punk (usually referred to simply as hardcore) is a punk rock music genre and subculture that originated in the late 1970s. The origin of the term "hardcore punk" is uncertain. The Vancouver-based band D.O.A. may have helped to popularize the term with the title of their 1981 album, Hardcore '81. Hardcore historian Steven Blush said that the term "hardcore" is also a reference to the sense of being "fed up" with the existing punk and new wave music. Blush also states that the term refers to "an extreme: the absolute most Punk." An article in Drowned in Sound argues that 1980s-era "hardcore is the true spirit of punk", because "after all the poseurs and fashionistas fucked off to the next trend of skinny pink ties with New Romantic haircuts, singing wimpy lyrics", the punk scene consisted only of people "completely dedicated to the DIY ethics". One definition of the genre is "a form of exceptionally harsh punk rock."

Influential early bands that formed in the Vancouver area included D.O.A., the Subhumans and The Skulls and from Vancouver Island the Dayglo Abortions. Other well-known groups that moved to the Vancouver scene include Nomeansno and SNFU. Canada has several Christian hardcore groups, including Grace like Winter and Means. An influential Toronto band was Bunchofuckingoofs (BFGs). Canada also has straight edge groups, such as Chokehold and an all-female band, Pantychrist.

== History ==
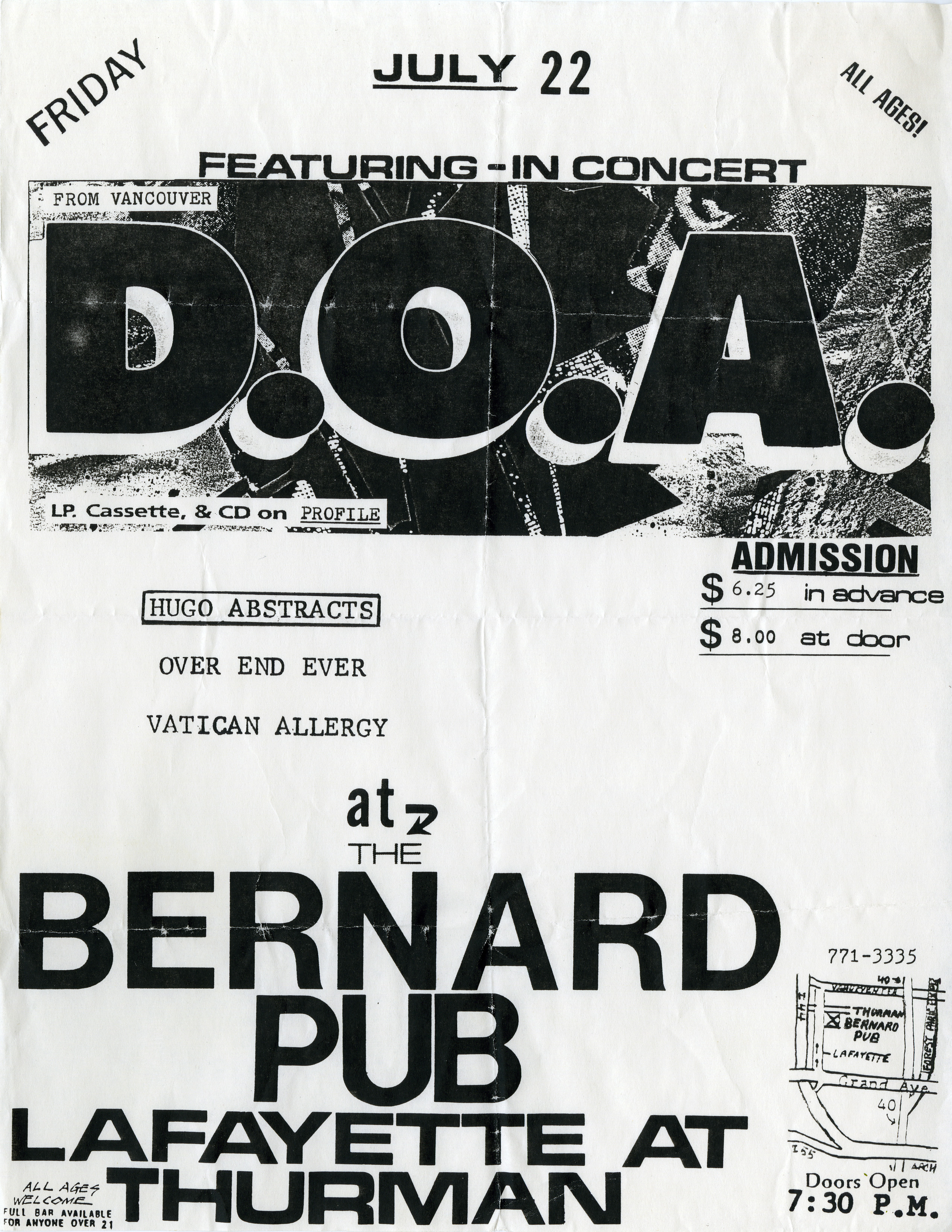
Concert poster of D.O.A. from July 22, 1988

=== Vancouver ===
The Skulls were an early Vancouver punk rock/hardcore band, whose members would later found two of the area's notable hardcore bands: D.O.A. and The Subhumans. They toured heavily and issued a demo, but never released any albums. Joey Keithley, a.k.a. Joey Shithead, was the singer, Brian Roy Goble, a.k.a. Wimpy Roy, the bass player, Simon Werner the guitar player and Ken Montgomery, a.k.a. Dimwit, the drummer. The Skulls played the (mostly hostile) club circuit in Vancouver and recorded a few songs at Psi-chords Studios, including "Fucked Up Baby", which would later become a D.O.A. song. After the Subhumans broke up in 1982, Wimpy joined DOA, which now featured Dimwit on drums, who had just been in the Pointed Sticks. For the next several years DOA's lineup was a virtual copy of the Skulls lineup, but with Dave Gregg instead of Simon Werner.

D.O.A. formed in Vancouver, British Columbia in 1978 and were one of the first bands to refer to its style as "hardcore", with the release of their album Hardcore '81. Other early hardcore bands from British Columbia included Dayglo Abortions, the Subhumans and The Skulls. In 1988, the Dayglo Abortions became the center of national media attention when a police officer instigated a criminal investigation of the band after his daughter brought home a copy of Here Today, Guano Tomorrow. Obscenity charges were laid against the Dayglo Abortions' record label, Fringe Product, and the label's record store, Record Peddler, but those charges were cleared in 1990.

The Subhumans are a punk band formed in Vancouver in 1978. Known by pejorative, punk rock nicknames, original members were known simply as "Useless" (Gerry Hannah), "Dimwit" (Ken Montgomery), "Wimpy" (Brian Roy Goble) and "Normal" (Mike Graham). Dimwit quit the band shortly after their first 7-inch was released to join the Pointed Sticks and was replaced by Koichi Imagawa, also known as Jim Imagawa, on drums. In 1981, Hannah left the band and gradually became involved with a small group of underground activists which were responsible for a number of actions, including the October 14, 1982, bombing of the Litton Industries plant in Ontario which made guidance systems for cruise missiles. The Subhumans finally broke up, with the singer joining D.O.A. on bass.

Nomeansno is a hardcore band originally from Victoria, British Columbia and now located in Vancouver. SNFU formed in Edmonton in 1981 and also later relocated to Vancouver. SNFU has released ten full-length albums and are cited as a formative influence on the skate punk subgenre. The band came to fruition amid the inchoate Canadian hardcore punk scene of the early 1980s. Coupling horrific and occasionally humorous lyrical imagery with a dynamic punk sound, their 1985 debut album ...And No One Else Wanted to Play has remained influential in underground circuits. Brand New Unit was a Canadian hardcore punk band from Vancouver. The band formed in 1991 near Surrey, and were widely known as the acronym B.N.U. in the early years, as a band name logo was needed to post on a playbill. They were featured on Thrasher Skate Rock Vol. 11 and in 1992 they were winners of CITR-FM's SHiNDiG live performance contest, which awarded them some studio time.

Stress Factor 9 is a hardcore punk band from Vancouver, formed in 2004. SF9's members include frontman Randy Rampage (founder of the hardcore band D.O.A. The band has one CD (Brainwarp Mindspin) and last played in January 2007.

=== Manitoba and Saskatchewan ===
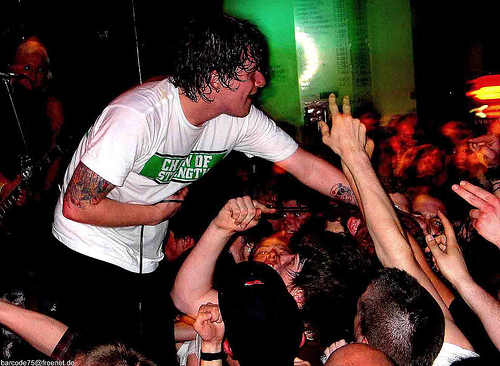
Comeback Kid in Sputnikhalle, Münster

Comeback Kid is a Canadian hardcore band from Winnipeg, Manitoba. Formed in 2000, the band is signed to Victory Records. Their name comes from a headline in a newspaper about hockey player, Mario Lemieux coming back to the NHL. The band was formed in 2002 by Andrew Neufeld and Jeremy Hiebert who were both members of the band Figure Four, which is currently on hiatus. They were joined by their friends Scott Wade and Kyle Profeta, but CBK was originally intended only to be a side project. Their initial popularity was mainly due to word of mouth within the hardcore scene.

Grace like Winter was a Christian progressive metal/hardcore punk band from Winnipeg, Manitoba, Canada. They were formed in November 1998, and disbanded for the last time in September 2002. They released records independently, and with the Raising The Roof record label. They were notable for having two singers, both of whom were female, as this is a rarity in the hardcore punk community. I Spy was a hardcore punk band founded in Regina, Saskatchewan in 1991. They relocated to Winnipeg, Manitoba in 1994, and disbanded in 1996. Combining childish humour and politically-oriented emotive hardcore, the group released several records on Recess Records and toured internationally. Front man Todd Kowalski later joined Propagandhi.The true hardcore scene however dates back much further than the 2000s or even the 90s.

Means was a Christian Post-hardcore/Melodic hardcore band from Regina, Saskatchewan. The band was formed in 2001 under the name of Means 2 An End as a 3-piece by main-songwriter/lyricist Matt Goud. They were originally from the small city of Dauphin, Manitoba. In 2003, they relocated to Regina, SK. They eventually integrated more and more elements of hardcore into their sound and dropped "2 An End" from their name. After many years of touring, the band began to accumulate a fanbase. It was around this time, in 2005, that original bassist Blair Roberts quit to pstart a family. He was replaced by Dylan Johnstone (formerly of Yorkton, SK hardcore group Statement of Service). They remained a three-piece until mid-2006 when Todd joined so Dylan could switch to lead vocals. Painted Thin was a Canadian hardcore punk band, formed in Winnipeg, and active from 1994 to 1999. The core of the band consisted of vocalist and guitarist Stephen Carroll and bassist and vocalist Paul Furgale, with a variety of guest musicians, including James Ash, Dan McCafferty and Jason Tait, on individual recordings. The first CD was Small Acts of Love and Rebellion, a split CD with John K. Samson, in 1995 on G7 Welcoming Committee Records, and the albums Still They Die of Heartbreak in 1997 and Clear, Plausible Stories in 1999 before breaking up. Carroll and Tait went on to join Samson's indie rock band, The Weakerthans, while Furgale started the band Sixty Stories.

Since 2020 a reemergent Hardcore and DBeat scene as developed both within the city of Saskatoon and Regina represented by bands such as Reject, Krash, Asspatch, Old Tolerated, Cambodian Death Camp and Repair from Saskatoon. With Fistfight, GROND and Modern Decay based in Regina. Venues include the Black Cat Tavern, The Capital, RCAF Hall and the Elks Hall located in Saskatoon with The Exchange and The Mercury based in Regina.

=== Toronto ===
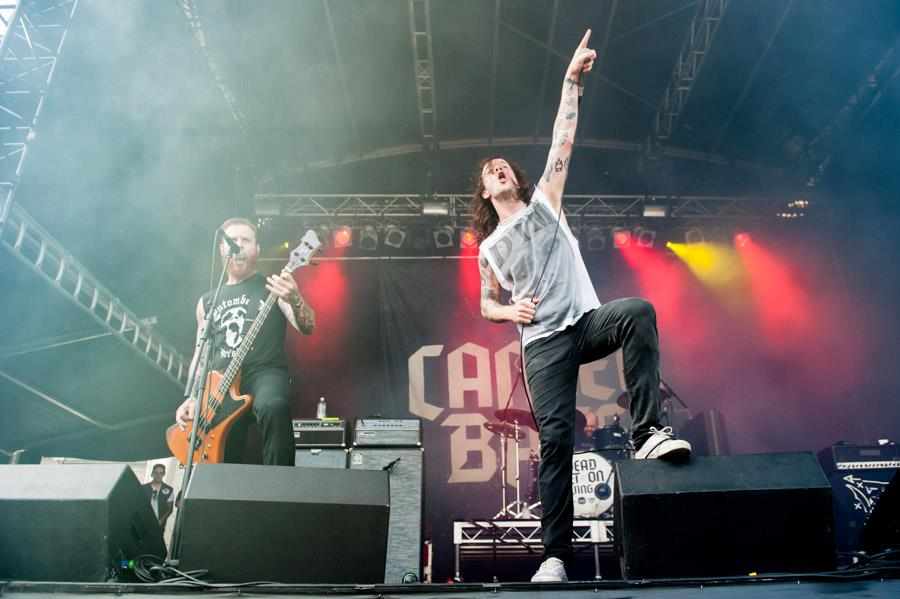
The Cancer Bats: (left to right) Jaye R. Schwarzer, Liam Cormier and Mike Peters (back) at a show in Sydney

The Young Lions, Chronic Submission, Afhakken, Youth Youth Youth, Direct Action, APB, Creative Zero are all hardcore bands from Toronto that appeared on the cassette (actually Creative Zero and Afhakken did not) TO Hardcore 83. The second wave of hardcore bands curated the largest punk scene in Canada from 1984 to 1989 and included bands like HYPE, Sudden Impact, Negative Gain, Problem Children, No Mind, Son's of Ishmael, Social Suicide, Missing Link, Circus Lupus, Brontocrushrock, MSI, Social Suicide, Verbal Assassination, Decimation among many others including Bunchofuckingoofs (BFGs), from the Kensington Market neighbourhood of Toronto, Ontario, formed in November 1983 as a response to "a local war with glue huffing Nazi skinheads."Armed and Hammered was a hardcore punk band from Toronto, Ontario, spawned from the Kensington Market, BFG (Bunchofuckingoofs) scene. They played their first show June 7, 1989, and their final show on April 19, 2003. Cancer Bats are a hardcore punk band from Toronto, Ontario, Canada. They have released four studio albums and six extended plays. The band is composed of vocalist Liam Cormier, guitarist Scott Middleton, drummer Mike Peters and bassist Jaye R. Schwarzer. Cancer Bats take a wide variety of influences from heavy metal subgenres and fuse them into hardcore punk and punk rock, and include elements of sludge metal, and southern rock.

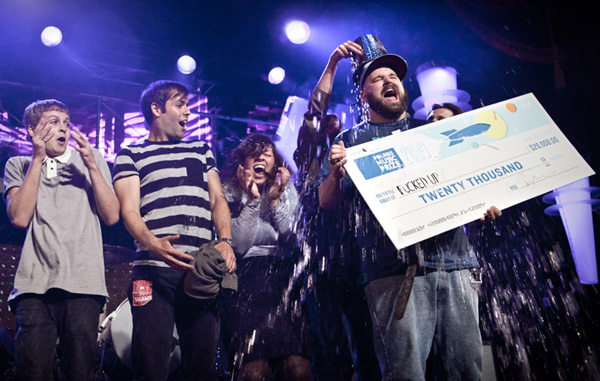
Fucked Up receiving the 2009 Polaris Music Prize

Career Suicide is a Canadian hardcore punk band formed in 2001 in Toronto. The band's first live performance took place in January 2002. The band has recorded several albums and singles on international labels. The band has completed multiple tours of North America, Europe and Japan. Fucked Up is a hardcore punk band from Toronto, Ontario, Canada. The band won the 2009 Polaris Music Prize for the album The Chemistry of Common Life. Liferuiner is a hardcore/metalcore group from Greater Toronto Area, formed in 2004. The band was originally created to make a sort of joke against mainstream straight edge bands by writing lyrics about hate and death rather than preaching their lifestyle. In early 2010 Liferuiner, fronted by original member and vocalist Jonny O'Callaghan, announced a return. Since that time the band has released the Sons of Straight Edge EP and 2013's Future Revisionists under InVogue Records.

No Warning was a hardcore punk band from Toronto, Ontario, Canada. The band was founded in 1998 under the name As We Once Were by singer Ben Cook and guitarists Matt Delong and Alan "Yeti" Riches. They released two demos, both in 1998, as As We Once Were. The band subsequently renamed itself No Warning. They released their 7-inch on New York label Martyr Records in 2001. Later that year, Boston based Bridge 9 Records re-released the 7-inch on CD with different artwork and the demo tape as bonus tracks. The band continued to play shows across the east coast of the United States and Canada with hardcore punk bands such as Hatebreed, Cro-Mags, Sick of It All, Terror and Bane. Through more touring, the band came in contact with Sum 41 manager/producer Greig Nori, and signed with his management/production company. While working with Nori, the band developed a more radio-friendly edge to their sound and signed to Machine Shop Records, a label founded by Linkin Park, and distributed through Warner Bros. Records. Suffer, Survive was released in late 2004. The band continued to tour with more bands such as Linkin Park, Sum 41, Papa Roach, The Used, Fear Factory, as well as older punk band SNFU, and up and coming bands such as Funeral for a Friend and Saosin. After a lot of time spent on tour and different directions the band wanted to take, No Warning broke up in late 2005.

=== Other Ontario cities ===
Chokehold were a Canadian vegan straight edge hardcore/punk band formed in 1990 in Hamilton. Their first release, More Than Ever, was in 1991. This was followed in 1992 by a split EP with Crisis of Faith and the Life Goes On EP that same year. Their rise in popularity paralleled that of other vegan straight edge bands such as Earth Crisis and hardline bands like Vegan Reich and Raid. While bands that adhered to Hardline were totally opposed to abortion, Chokehold was vehemently pro-choice. Counterparts (formed 2007 Hamilton, Ontario) are a Canadian melodic hardcore band. The band currently consists of lead vocalist Brendan Murphy, guitarists Jesse Doreen and Adrian Lee and drummer Kelly Bilan. The band's most recent two albums have received critical acclaim from magazines Rock Sound and Exclaim!. They were released through Victory Records. Pantychrist is a female hardcore punk rock band from Hamilton, Canada and was formed in 2003 by Danyell DeVille, Izabelle Steele, Amy Hell and Patty Rotten. They have been described as "a full throttle blast of estrogen fueled aggression: angry, intense and unrelenting". The group has a growing catalogue of recorded output and have played shows that supported causes such as Rock Against Rape, Breast Cancer Awareness and Inasmuch Women's Shelter. There have been many lineup changes since the band's inception, and as of 2013 DeVille is the only original member left in Pantychrist. Zeroption were a hardcore punk band formed in 1981 in Oakville. The original lineup was Gord Option (bass), Kealan Option (drums) and Stuart Option (guitar). The band played numerous live performances with many punk acts of the day including the Bad Brains, the F.U.'s, D.O.A., the Dead Kennedys, Social Distortion and the Circle Jerks.

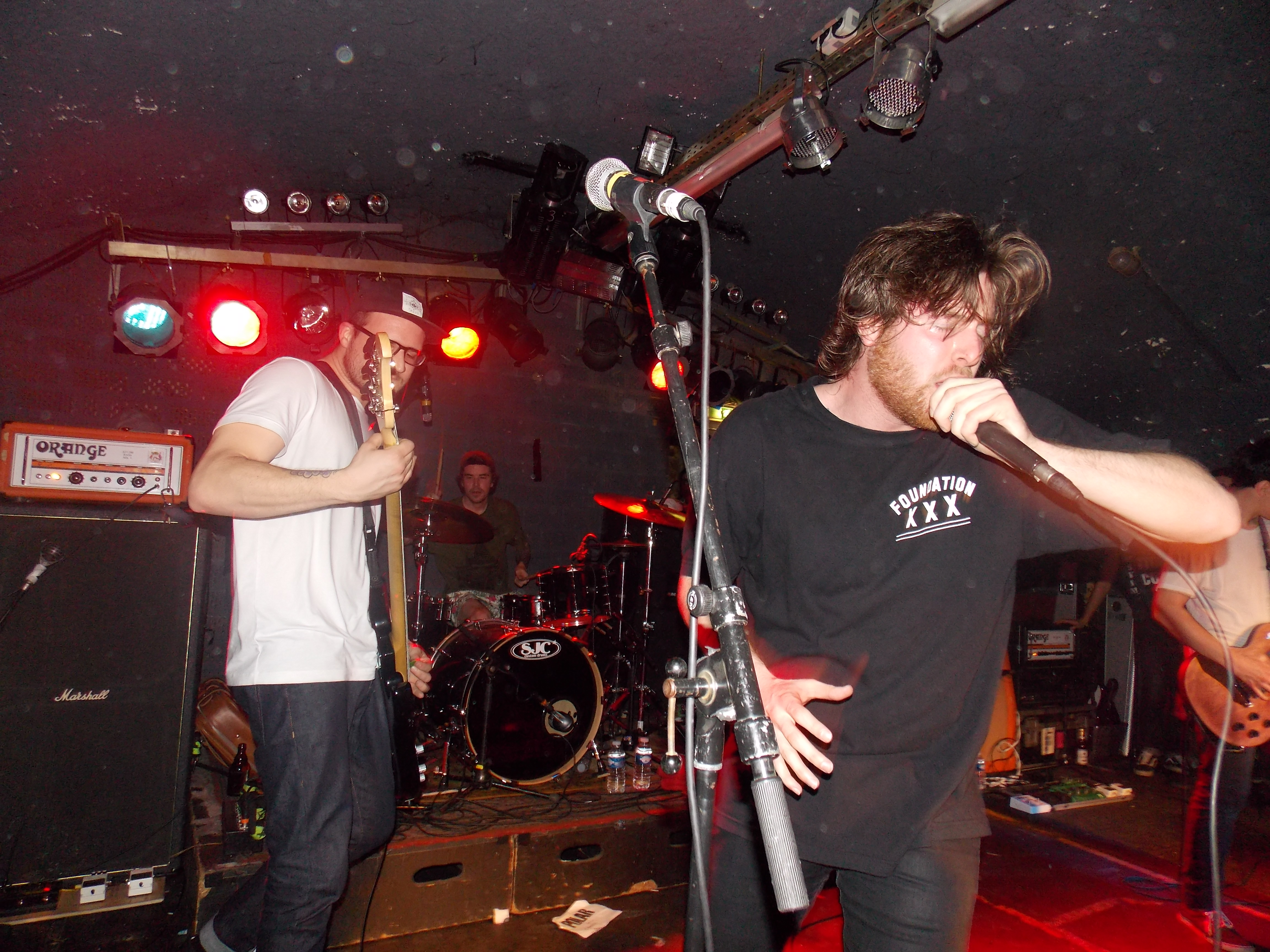
Counterparts playing in Trier

Baptized in Blood are a five-piece London, Ontario-based heavy metal and hardcore band. They are managed by Mark Adelman and Dave Mustaine, the frontman of American heavy metal band, Megadeth. They have been signed to Roadrunner Records since December 2009. Cunter (formerly known as Hunter) is a five-piece hardcore punk supergroup from Brampton, Ontario. It features members of Moneen, Alexisonfire, BWC Studios and The Abandoned Hearts Club. The band was founded early 2009 and is signed on Dine Alone Records. The band members were secretly revealed via a promotional website.

Grade is a Canadian hardcore/emo group. Grade's first release was the Grade/Believe split which was released in 1994 on a small Canadian label - Workshop Records. And Such Is Progress followed in 1997 and Separate the Magnets was released in 1998, earning them critical praise and touring slots with groups such as Jimmy Eat World, Hot Water Music and Fugazi. In 1999, they signed with Victory Records and released an EP, Triumph and Tragedy. Later that same year they released a full-length album, Under the Radar. In 2000, they released The Embarrassing Beginning, a collection of their older works, as well as rarities. In 2001, original guitarist Greg Taylor left to pursue Jersey full-time, and was replaced with Brad Casarin. Chris Danner subsequently left, with Charlie Moniz joining for the release of the album Headfirst Straight to Hell. In their final incarnation, only Kyle Bishop remained, backed by members of the group Somehow Hollow. The band broke up in 2002.

Shotmaker is a band formed with members from Belleville and Ottawa in 1993. The trio is a post-hardcore/emo/screamo outfit who played aggressive yet melodic hardcore music. Shotmaker's catalogue comprises three 7-inches, two full-length LPs and a 12-inch split EP. There is also a Shotmaker Demo Tape which is not included in the Complete Discography Double CD. The group parted ways in 1996, but released their double CD retrospective The Complete Discography: 1993-1996 in 2000, comprising almost the entirety of their recorded material (not including a Demo Tape), including several tracks exclusive to compilations and three unreleased songs.

The 3tards were a Canadian hardcore punk rock band that was formed in Brampton, Ontario, in 2001. They released two full-length albums - Greatest Hits Vol. 2 (Wounded Paw, 2004, re-released by Spinerazor/Universal Music Canada, 2006) and Crystal Balls (Spinerazor/Universal Music Canada, 2005). They were known for their satirically outrageous, vulgar and sexual lyrics, wild live shows including costumes, theatrics (they've staged live births, circumcisions, blood baptisms, etc. as part of their act), and socially liberal politics (for example following its legalization in Canada they held a mock gay wedding on stage between John Tard and Fox Tard, including a passionate kiss between the two). They have been described as "Canada's most politically incorrect punk band."

=== Montreal ===
One early Montreal hardcore band is The Asexuals, a mainstay of the local punk scene in the 1980s. Born Dead Icons was a hardcore punk band from Montreal. They played melodic, heavy and dark d-beat hardcore punk with various influences, mainly British bands Amebix, Discharge, Zounds, and Motörhead. They played slower and sung more clearly than most bands in this genre. The band played their last show in November 2007.

Banlieue Rouge was a punk band from Montreal, formed in 1989. They disbanded in 1999. Their lyrics being written in French, worldwide success was unlikely to ever be reached. However, they did manage to gain considerable popularity in France and Quebec along with the release of their third studio album "Engrenages", in 1993. Banlieue Rouge translates as "Red Suburb". On their debut album, En Attendant Demain (intro, "Psaume Rouge"), it is explained that this refers to their status as "a suburb of the megacity of pop music, unknown to the masses." As for the "red" part of the name, "Red is shock, anger, revolt, free youth is red-painted, of disobedience and militant alternative red." «Bienvenue en Banlieue Rouge!»

Akuma is a punk band from Quebec formed in 1998 by former members of Banlieue Rouge. It is one of the few bands with bilingual (French/English) lyrics. The original line-up comprised Safwan (guitar and vocals), Simon (bass and background vocals), Sylva (drums), and Mark (guitar, background vocals). It was this line-up which created the group's first album, 100 Démons, released in March 2001 by Yakuza Productions. Their first album was distributed through traditional means, and the band decided to distribute their second album, Subversion (released 2004 by Pavillon Noir), directly to their fans through their website. At concerts, they claimed the idea was to avoid middlemen.

Genetic Control is a Canadian hardcore punk band from Montreal, whose "First Impressions" single is a sought-after item for punk record collectors. They existed from 1983 to 1986, and then reunited in 1998. They played with many bands such as the Dead Kennedys, Charged GBH and Suicidal Tendencies. They were also known for the comical disguises they wore on stage during the band's performances.

Humanifesto is a hardcore punk music group from Montreal. Formed in the summer of 2004, the band wrote and recorded their first album, A Declaration Of Intent with the help of The Sainte Catherines' Rich Bouthillier filling in on drums, and their guitarist Marc-Andre Beaudet behind the mixing console. Over the next few years, the band would perform over 100 shows in the Eastern Canadian area, sharing the stage with notable acts including Propagandhi, Strike Anywhere, The Video Dead, Chixdiggit and Hostage Life. In the summer of 2006, the band returned into the studio to record a new EP, entitled Don't Eat Meat.

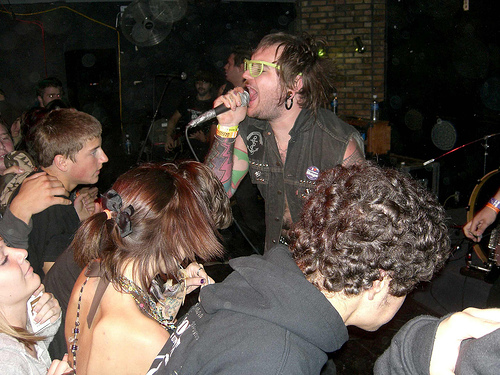
The Sainte Catherines

The Sainte Catherines are a six-piece punk-rock band who formed in Montreal in 1999. The group's name comes from Rue Sainte-Catherine, one of Montreal's main streets. Their third record, The Art of Arrogance was released on local label Dare to Care Records in 2003 and on the German label Yo-Yo Records. In 2006, the band released its fourth LP, titled Dancing for Decadence. The album was released in the United States by Fat Wreck Chords. The Sainte Catherines are the first band from Quebec to be signed to Fat Wreck. In August 2006, The Sainte Catherines played their 500th show. They also released split 7-inch records with Fifth Hour Hero and Whiskey Sunday. In 2008, The Sainte Catherines won a GAMIQ Award for punk album of the year. They disbanded in April 2012 after their farewell tour with The Hunters.

=== Other Quebec cities ===
Dahmer was a grindcore and D-beat band formed in Quebec City, Canada in 1995. They composed songs about serial killers (hence their name referring to Jeffrey Dahmer), mass murderers and other various topics, some not even criminal-related and mostly humorous. Though the group split up in early 2000, members are currently still involved in other grindcore bands such as Fistfuck and other sporadic live performances as well as various side projects.

Spanning from 1994 to 2000, the Sherbrooke punk scene was highly active. All ages D.I.Y. venues like the Zone Indélibile and the Katacombes hosted many local bands, including Shitfit, General Fools, Pass out, Urban Assault, Scapegoats, Chapak, Monik Maniak, Apathetic Nation, Blind Remainz and Seized. Many of these bands were formed from a small core group of musicians, who played in multiple groups.

The scene eventually hosted bands from the US and Europe. A mixture of punk political correctness blended with the European punk squat-style chaotic lifestyle. Mohawks, dreads, studs and spikes were worn. At its peak, many Montreal punks and bands came to Sherbrooke. Hardcore bands from Sherbrooke tended to have a crust punk sound, mid-paced tempos and usually dual vocalists, often including a woman. Unlike the typical Montreal metal-influenced crust, the sound was more like E.N.T. and Chaos UK. Sherbrooke bands used a touch of humour both musically and lyrically. Song topics followed Minneapolis punker vegan/feminist credos.

By the end of 1999, following the lack of rehearsal spaces, excess drug use, deaths and a major exile to Montreal of the main musicians, the Sherbrooke scene's momentum came to an end. Few of those bands have released material in the 2000s. Meanwhile, a straight edge scene developed in the suburbs, with bands such as One Eyed God Prophecy.

Radical Attack is a Canadian hardcore punk band originally from Sherbrooke, Quebec. The band formed in 2002 and disbanded in early 2009. They toured Canada in its entirety and the east coast of the United States. They released a few split 7-inches with various bands such as Crucial Attack and Talk Hard. Priority is their last release and only full length.

Similarly, the town of Chateauguay has been the birthplace of active hardcore punk bands, including late 90s All the Answers, ...And the Saga Continues, Chemical Way and When I Fall.
