= Canadian punk rock =

Music genre or scene

The first punk rock bands in Canada emerged during the mid/late 1970s, in the wake of the US bands Ramones, The Stooges, New York Dolls, and Blondie, and the UK band Sex Pistols. The Viletones, the Diodes and the Demics were among the pioneers, together with the Skulls (featuring Joey who formed DOA and Wimpy (Brian Roy) who led the Subhumans) from Vancouver, and Hamilton's Teenage Head, whose records and live shows earned them the nickname "Canada's Ramones". Vibrant local punk scenes sprung up in Toronto and Vancouver and other Canadian cities.

== History ==
=== 1970s–1990s ===
Early Toronto punk bands included the Viletones, the Diodes, the Poles, the Ugly, Cardboard Brains, the Dents, the Mods, the Secrets, ARSON and the Scenics, and these were followed by the Demics, Crash Kills Five, Stark Naked and the Fleshtones and L'Étranger, plus Hamilton's Forgotten Rebels and Teenage Head. Formed in Montreal in 1978, the all female band Blue Oil was part of Quebec's early punk scene. In Vancouver D.O.A. and the Subhumans led a 1978-79-80 scene that included Pointed Sticks, Braineaters, Young Canadians, and the Modernettes. A few years later and many bands across Canada were carrying the punk torch, including Young Lions, Youth Youth Youth, Bunchofuckingoofs, SNFU, Dayglo Abortions, the Nils, Direct Action, APB, Nomeansno and Chronic Submission.

Two of the biggest early punk shows in Toronto were The Last Pogo at the Horseshoe tavern in 1978, featuring Teenage Head, the Viletones, the Scenics, the Cardboard Brains, the Secrets, the Mods, and the Ugly, and the Rock Against Radiation concert July 19, 1980, at Nathan Phillips Square, featuring DOA, Stark Naked and the Fleshtones, the Viletones, the Forgotten Rebels, plus Joe College (promoter of the show) and the Rulers.

Canadian hardcore punk also originated in the early 1980s. D.O.A. are known as the first Canadian hardcore band, and with the release of their album Hardcore '81 they set the standards for the style of music. That album title is considered to be the origin of the term hardcore punk.

The punk tradition has carried on in Canada right up to modern bands like Fucked Up, The Salads, Alexisonfire, PUP, Cancer Bats.

=== 2000s–2010s ===
==== Calgary sound ====
During the 2000s and 2010s, a Canadian indie rock and post-punk scene developed in the city of Calgary in Alberta, Canada spearheaded by Women, while acts such as Ought based in Montreal, Quebec were linked and compared to them.

== Notable record labels ==
- Cargo Records
- Deranged Records
- Fringe Product
- G7 Welcoming Committee Records
- The Great American Steak Religion
- Insurgence Records
- Mayday Records
- Mint Records
- Og Records
- Psyche Industry Records
- Raw Energy Records
- Smallman Records
- Stomp Records
- Sonic Unyon
- Sudden Death Records
- Quintessence Records
- Union Label Group

== Notable events ==
Rock against Radiation concert promo button.

The Rock Against Radiation concert on July 19, 1980, at Nathan Phillips Square in Toronto was considered a seminal event in the Canadian punk scene, as it brought together bands from the Toronto and the Vancouver punk scenes on the same stage for the first time. Featured bands included DOA, Stark Naked and the Fleshtones, the Demics, the Viletones, Joe College and the Rulers, plus the Forgotten Rebels (from Hamilton).

== See also ==
- Music of Canada
- Canadian hardcore punk
