= The Cleanest War =

EP by Morning Again
- Released: May 15, 1996
- Recorded: January 1996
- Studio: Studio 13, Deerfield Beach, Florida, United States
- Genre: Metallic hardcore
- Length: 20:46
- Label: Conquer the World
- Producer: Jeremy Staska

Morning Again chronology
| The Cleanest War (1996) | As Tradition Dies Slowly (1998) |

The Cleanest War is the debut extended play by American metallic hardcore band Morning Again. It was released on May 15, 1996, by American record label Conquer the World Records, initially on compact disc, and subsequently on 12" vinyl and digitally.

The release was recorded with vocalist Damien Moyal, guitarists John Wylie and Michael Wolz, bass guitarist Eric Ervin and drummer Louie Long. In promotion of the release, the band toured the United States and Canada during the summer of 1996, playing with such bands as Hot Water Music, Bane, Elliott, 108, Inquisition, Rye Coalition and Fury of Five. Moyal and Ervin were fired from the band shortly after returning home from the tour.

The material recorded for The Cleanest War was the basis of several Morning Again compilation albums over the years, including Hand of Hope for Good Life Recordings, Hand of the Martyr for Eulogy Recordings and Alveran Records, and I for Demons Run Amok Entertainment; it was also re-issued by Stick to the Core in 2022.

== Background ==
=== Composition and recording ===
Morning Again was formed in November 1995, by guitarist and principle songwriter John Wylie and drummer Louie Long. The pair had previously played together in the metallic hardcore bands Culture and Organized Pain. After practicing with vocalist César Morales for about a month, they recruited new vocalist Damien Moyal, who had also previously played in Culture with Wylie, and Reach (another metallic hardcore band) with Long, and was then a member of the melodic metalcore band Shai Hulud. Although Moyal and Wylie had suffered conflicts of interest in Culture nine months prior (which had led to Moyal's departure shortly before a tour and hasty replacement by Long), the two hoped to reconcile their differences, which in turn inspired the lyrics to Moyal's first Morning Again song, "Turning Over". In December 1995, the band was completed with the addition of second guitarist Michael Wolz (formerly of Uplipht and After All) and bass guitarist Eric Ervin (formerly of Discount).

In late January 1996, the band entered Studio 13 in Deerfield Beach, Florida to record five songs ("Turning Over", "Family Ties", "America On Line", "Minus One" and "Remedy") with recording engineer and producer Jeremy Staska. Moyal and Wylie had previously recorded at the studio several times with Culture, while Long had recorded there with his other band Donut Run.

The lyrics to "Family Ties" talk about a teenager having to choose between a bigoted family or everything else in which he personally believes; the release's title The Cleanest War stems from a line of lyric in the song "Alone is the cleanest war, at least it's now fought fair". "America On Line" deals with social and political issues surrounding internet dependency, being entrapped by one's computer, social security numbers and tracking by the LoJack system. Its title is a reference to the internet service provider America On Line. "Minus One" recounts a story from the perspective of parents whose child is abducted and murdered; how it must feel to have a child taken away and what one would want to do about it, challenging the positions of the death sentence. It was loosely inspired by the story of Adam Walsh, which had become folklore for children growing up in Miami, Florida during the 1980s and early 1990s. "Remedy" was partly inspired by the 1995 film Outbreak, and partly by the AIDS disease, and deals with a fictional political authority that has developed a cure for the virus but is refusing to make it public for nefarious reasons and profit. The opening of the song includes a sample from the film, and the ending features backing group vocals performed by all of the members of the band.

=== Release and distribution ===
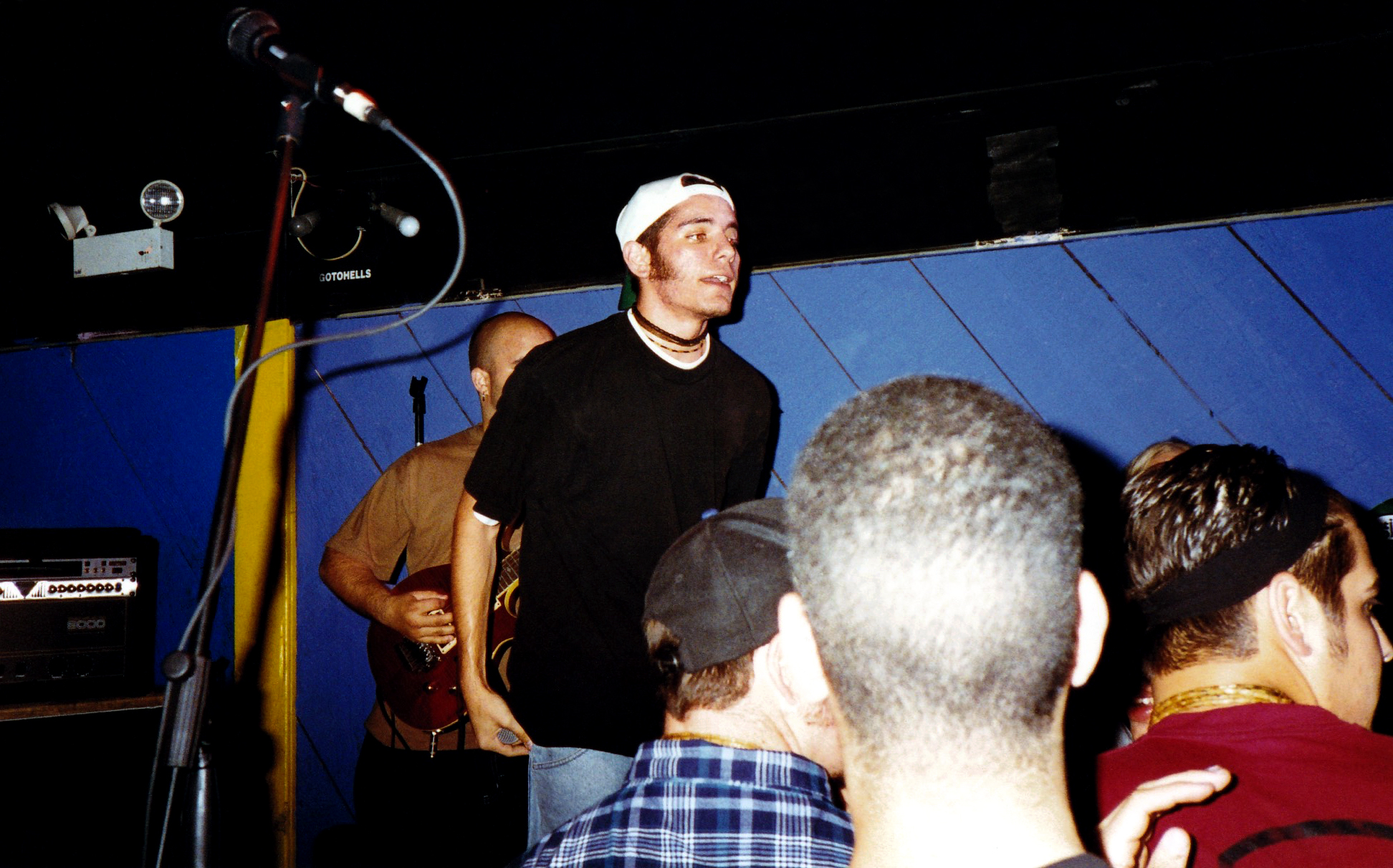
Morning Again performing at Cheers in Coconut Grove, Florida on June 11, 1996. Damien Moyal center and John Wylie behind him.

Although Wylie later professed in retrospective interviews that the band originally went into Studio 13 to record a demo tape, without definitive plans for a future release, he had already been in contact with Redford, Michigan-based record label Conquer the World Records' owner Michael Warden. Conquer the World Records had previously released Culture's debut full-length album, Born of You, in June 1995, and although the band had mixed feelings about the record label's practices, Wylie remained in contact with Warden, letting him hear practice recordings of his new band Morning Again's songs over the phone. Warden liked what he heard and offered to release whatever the band recorded.

With the band's debut extended play originally scheduled for release in mid-April 1996 (it was ultimately delayed by a month), Morning Again self-released a limited edition demo tape that included the songs "Turning Over" and "Remedy"; the demo tape was available starting February 9, 1996. The cover art and booklet design for The Cleanest War was made up of Moyal's newly-designed band logo and handwritten song titles (for the back cover), along with live pictures of the band taken by Stefanie Jones, Kelly Wisniewski and Heather Iannelli. The layout work was handled by Ronald Jasin, an associate of Conquer the World Records.

Conquer the World Records released The Cleanest War on compact disc on May 15, 1996. The 12" vinyl version was delayed by several months, and was first released on a clear medium blue color with black swirl, limited to 300 copies. It was subsequently repressed twice by Conquer the World Records. The second pressing was released in August 1998 and came on clear color with black swirl (limited to 500 copies) and clear color with black and green swirl (limited to 75 copies). The third pressing was released in December 1998 and came on solid black color, limited to 300 copies. In October 2005, Conquer the World Records reissued The Cleanest War digitally through digital retailers Echospin and iTunes.

In a 1997 interview, Wylie initially criticized Conquer the World Records for only selling a few thousand copies of the release, but in subsequent interviews, he criticized the record label for repressing the release without the band's permission.

=== Reissues ===
All five songs from The Cleanest War were later combined with Morning Again's eponymous 7" vinyl (recorded in March 1996), for Belgian record label Good Life Recordings' compact disc and 12" vinyl compilation Hand of Hope, released in January 1997. The same songs were again reissued on the compact disc compilation Hand of the Martyr, which was co-released by Wylie's own record label, Eulogy Recordings, and German record label Alveran Records, on May 28, 2002, to coincide with a Morning Again reunion show. The songs were once again repackaged on the 12" vinyl compilation I, released by German record label Demons Run Amok Entertainment on September 25, 2015. In 2022, Belgian record label Stick to the Core Records repressed The Cleanest War for its 26th anniversary.

== Promotion ==
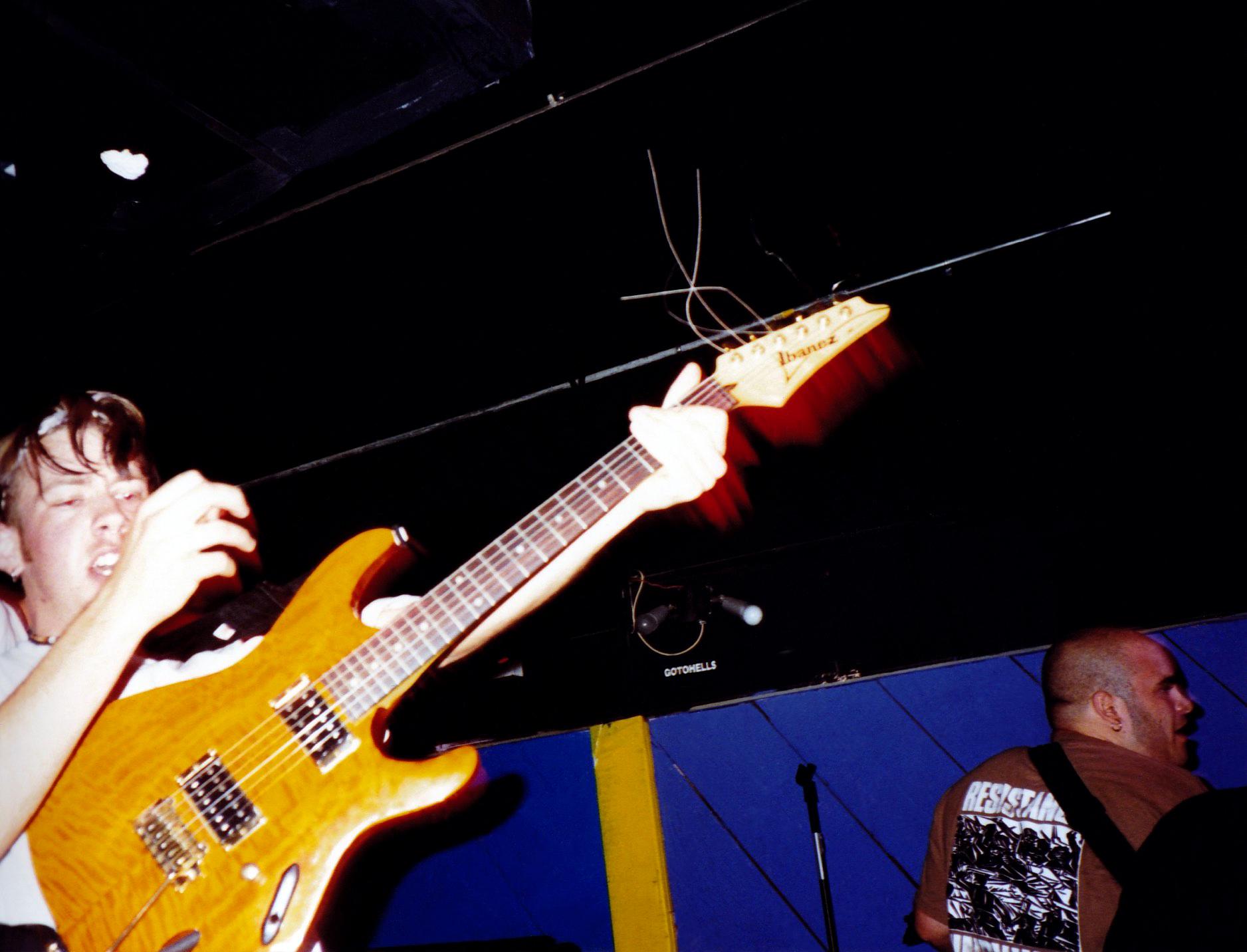
Morning Again performing at Cheers in Coconut Grove, Florida on June 11, 1996. Michael Wolz (left) and John Wylie (right).

=== Touring ===
In promotion of The Cleanest War and its eponymous 7" vinyl (both released in May 1996), the band embarked on its first two-week North American tour, playing shows across the East Coast and Midwest of the United States and Canada. Accompanied by Intention Records owner Jon Philips as roadie, the tour spanned from May 27 to June 12, 1996, during which Morning Again played in Atlanta, Georgia, Madisonville, Ohio, Indianapolis, Indiana, Dayton, Ohio, Cleveland, Ohio, Westland, Michigan, Oakville, Ontario, Buffalo, New York, Connecticut, Takoma Park, Maryland, Washington D.C., Gainesville, Florida, Coconut Grove, Florida, and Saint Petersburg, Florida. The band shared the stage with such bands as Hot Water Music, Bane, Elliott, 108, Inquisition, Rye Coalition and Fury of Five.

=== Member changes ===
Shortly after returning home from the tour, Moyal and Ervin were fired from the band due to recurring conflicts with Wylie. In a retrospective interview, Moyal revealed that his firing was driven by egos and a fight for leadership of the band. Wylie wanted the band to become a strict vegan and straight-edge outfit, with not only the members following those lifestyles, but for the band's lyrics to preach those beliefs as well, while Moyal, on the other hand, had joined Morning Again under the condition that his lyrics would not be limited to topics once covered in his former vegan and straight edge band Culture. Unbeknownst to Moyal, Wylie had already made plans to replace him with Kevin Byers, a musician then-based in Dayton, Ohio, with whose band, Outcast, Morning Again had played four days into the tour. Byers, in turn, invited another friend from Dayton, Ohio, Christopher Beckham, to replace Ervin. Moyal went on to play in Bird of Ill Omen, As Friends Rust, Bridgeburne R and Damien Done, while Ervin played in Kumité.

== Critical reception and recognition ==
Professional ratings
Review scores
| Source | Rating |
|---|---|
| Bound by Modern Age | Positive |
| Dogprint | Positive |
| Fracture | Positive |
| HeartattaCk | Negative |
| Inside Front | Mixed |
| Jersey Beat | Positive |
| Ox-Fanzine | Negative |
| Ox-Fanzine | Positive |
| Slug and Lettuce | Positive |

The Cleanest War and Morning Again received mixed critical acclaim upon the extended play's release. Although a first review by Ox-Fanzine panned the release in 1996, a second review published in 1997 stated "The best release that has been released on Conquer the World Records to date is probably the Chokehold LP, but Morning Again could be the next big thing for [the label]." Fracture's Sean McKee noted that "the band created thick chugging anthems, with scattered and intricate detail and guitar leads straight from the Bay Area thrash metal scene", while Christine Boarts at Slug and Lettuce opined "I absolutely love this band. Power-packed, heavy on the metal-hardcore that is all about the chugga chugga and judd judd chunks with a unique and nice balance of emo bits".

The release, however, received criticism for its affiliation with Conquer the World Records, with writers pointing out that the record label had shady business dealings, and was noted for its substandard layout designs.

The band was quickly compared to its predecessor, Culture, as well as to Despair, Unbroken, Snapcase, Deadguy, Chokehold, Earth Crisis, and Slayer. With the term "metalcore" not yet a household name, Morning Again's style was described by critics as "new school mosh hardcore", "new school heavy hardcore", "metal-influenced hardcore", "hardcore heavy with metal", and "lending their hardcore influences with tight metallic elements". Reviewers described the music as powerful and having "fast cross-over metal riffs", "breaks with subsequent tempo changes", "heavy start and stop", and "mixing a robust collection of breaks and breakdowns". Praise was given for the use of acoustic guitar for "a melodic effect" in the opening of "Minus One".

Staska's recording was praised as a "good, clean production that enhances the metal aspect of the music". Most reviewers also complimented Moyal's spoken word-style vocal delivery, and noted his lyrics as well-written. However, some reviewers (including Kent McClard of HeartattaCk) singled-out and mocked the lyrics from "America On Line", which dealt with internet dependency, an obscure topic at the time.

== Track listing ==
Credits are adapted from the EP's liner notes. All lyrics written by Damien Moyal; all music composed by John Wylie.

As Tradition Dies Slowly track listing
| No. | Title | Length |
|---|---|---|
| 1. | "Turning Over" | 3:11 |
| 2. | "Family Ties" | 3:21 |
| 3. | "American on Line" | 4:09 |
| 4. | "Minus One" | 6:13 |
| 5. | "Remedy" | 3:52 |
| Total length: | | 20:46 |

== Personnel ==
Credits are adapted from the EP's liner notes.

Morning Again

- Damien Moyal – lead vocals
- John Wylie – guitar, backing vocals on "Remedy"
- Michael Wolz – guitar, backing vocals on "Remedy"
- Eric Ervin – bass guitar, backing vocals on "Remedy"
- Louie Long – drums, backing vocals on "Remedy"

Production

- Jeremy Staska – recording engineer, mixer and producer at Studio 13
- Damien Moyal – band logo and handwritten text
- Ronald Jasin – layout
- Stefanie Jones – photography
- Kelly Wisniewski – photography
- Heather Iannelli – photography

== Release history ==
Release formats for The Cleanest War
| Region | Date | Label | Format | Catalog |
|---|---|---|---|---|
| United States | May 15, 1996 | Conquer the World Records | CD | CTW 016 |
| United States | 1996 | Conquer the World Records | LP | CTW 016 |
| United States | August 18, 1998 | Conquer the World Records | LP (repress) | CTW 016 |
| United States | December 1998 | Conquer the World Records | LP (repress) | CTW 016 |
| United States | October 2005 | Conquer the World Records | Digital | CTW 016 |
| Belgium | November 27, 2021 | Stick to the Core Records | Digital (reissue) | STTC 020 |
| Belgium | June 2022 / October 2022 | Stick to the Core Records | LP (repress) | STTC 020 |
