= Pantychrist =

Canadian all-female punk rock band

- Origin: Hamilton, Ontario, Canada
- Genres: Hardcore punk, punk rock, riot grrrl, heavy metal
- Years active: 2003–present
- Labels: AMP Records, D.O.R. Records, Suburban White Trash Records, Cleopatra Records
- Members: Danyell DeVille; Emma-O; Lexxi LaRoux; Clara Danger
- Past members: Izabelle Steele; Amy Hell; Nick Tops; Patty Christ; Emma-O; Cari Corpse; Jen O'Cyde; Statia Ace; Emma Sunstrum
- Website: www.pantychrist.net

Pantychrist is an all-female hardcore punk band from Hamilton, Ontario, Canada that was formed in 2003 by Danyell DeVille, Izabelle Steele, Amy Hell, and Patty Rotten. They have been described as "a full throttle blast of estrogen fueled aggression: angry, intense and unrelenting". The group has a growing catalogue of recorded output and have played shows that supported causes such as Rock Against Rape, Breast Cancer Awareness, and Inasmuch Women's Shelter. There have been many lineup changes since the band's inception and as of 2013 DeVille is the only original member left in Pantychrist. Emma-O recently rejoined them.

== History ==
Previous to Pantychrist, Danyell DeVille had played in a band called Die Human Die, and Amy Hell and Patty Rotten played in a group called the Bitter Ex's. After Danyell and Izabelle Steele met Amy and Patty in a women's washroom they formed Pantychrist with Patty changing her name to Patty Christ to reflect her involvement in the band.

The group released a demo called ShEPeed in 2004 and followed that up with a limited edition cd entitled Demo-lition Dirty in 2005 that was distributed at the NXNE and CMW festivals. AMP Records put out their debut full length Never Love Anything CD in 2005 and the record release party was free and featured "lots of spilled beer, blood and public nudity."

Early Pantychrist shows featured Izabelle Steele playing in her underwear and drummer Patty Christ having a 'beer slave' onstage pouring beer into her mouth while she played. Singer Danyell DeVille would throw drinks in peoples faces, smash bottles on stage and in the audience, climb speaker stacks, slam microphones into her head, throw herself onto the floor and generally be "a blustering fury tearing everyone and everything in her real or imagined way a new asshole". A documentary film crew followed the band over a period of weeks in 2005 and the result was a DVD called Skirting With Disaster that was issued through AMP Records in 2006.

Pantychrist parted ways with Patty Christ at the end of 2006 and she was replaced by Nick Tops from Toronto band The G-Men who was to be filling in temporarily while the group attempted to find a new female drummer. This lineup issued a self-titled CD in 2007 and Tops played with the band until they went on hiatus in June 2008. DeVille during this time had started a rock and roll band with Toronto guitarist Staci T. Rat called Chop Suicide. They released a 5 track CD and toured the United Kingdom before that outfit stopped.

In 2010, Pantychrist returned with new drummer Cari Corpse. Bass player Amy Hell was replaced by Jen O’Cyde in 2011 and the group released a CD called Break It Down on D.O.R. Records which was a compilation featuring some of their rare and out of print early material and some new songs. Pantychrist recorded a 7" record for Suburban White Trash Records called The Girls Next Door but before it was released Danyell DeVille was arrested on a charge of first degree murder in January 2012. That charge was subsequently withdrawn by the Crown Attorney and she pleaded guilty to being an accessory to robbery. Shortly after DeVille's arrest a documentary was posted online called The Rise Of Pantychrist: Portrait Of A Band that was composed of interviews and footage with the 2007 lineup.

Pantychrist issued a statement in March 2013 that they were still rehearsing and working on new material while awaiting DeVille's eventual release. It was also revealed that Izabelle Steele was no longer in Pantychrist and had been replaced by guitarist Emma-O who had most recently played with another Hamilton punk band called Slander. Pantychrist released the song "No Gods No Masters" in 2014 on a compilation called Assault & BATtery which was a benefit for Bat World Sanctuary.

Pantychrist had their song "Bitch" included in the stage production Riot Grrrl Saves The World which premiered in Hollywood in June 2014. The play was written by Award Winning Playwright Louisa Hill and produced by Will Play For Food Theater Group. The production also featured music by other influential Riot Grrrl bands including Bikini Kill, Slant 6, Excuse 17, and Dickless.

In 2015, Cari Corpse retired from playing due to knee injuries and Emma Sunstrum became the new Pantychrist drummer. The band also introduced guitar player Statia XII Ace after the departure of Emma-O. Cleopatra Records released a compilation called Riot Grrrl Christmas on October 30, 2015, that featured Pantychrist performing the lead off track.

A book entitled Evenings & Weekends: Five Years In Hamilton Music 2006 - 2011 was written by Andrew Baulcomb chronicling his experiences with the bands and people he encountered in the local Hamilton, Ontario music scene and was published in 2016. Danyell DeVille was interviewed for the project and Pantychrist have a four-page feature in the book.

Pantychrist announced in 2017 that Emma-O had returned to the band and that Lexxi LaRoux was now playing bass. A new thirteen song album was to be released in 2018 and the band had stated that the original title has changed. CrACkHeAdS AnD ENAbLeRs was the previously listed name of the upcoming album.

Fraught Productions announced in 2018 that Pantychrist are providing the sound for the fictional band Monster Kitten in their movie Dead Air. "Set on a plane travelling to a final gig, Dead Air tells the story of Monster Kitten, an all female punk rock band who end up on a flight with some nasty little creatures who like to bite and infect their victims to the point of all hell breaking loose at 30,000 feet. With the help of their instruments, a tape recorder, a dodgy crew member and a bottle of piss, the band try to fend off the evil to get to play their final gig."

== Releases ==
- ShEPeed demo 2004
- Demo-lition Dirty CD Independent 2005
- Never Love Anything cd AMP Records 2005
- Skirting With Disaster DVD AMP Records 2006
- Pantychrist Independent CD 2007
- Break It Down D.O.R. Records CD 2011
- Girls Next Door Suburban White Trash Records 7" (unreleased)
- Crackheads And Enablers CD (upcoming)

== Hiatus ==
Throughout Pantychrist's career there have been instances of the band being on "hiatus" for periods of time. These absences have been credited to band member pregnancies, stints in rehab facilities, and jail time.

== Controversy ==
At the 2005 It's Your Festival outdoor show in Hamilton, Ontario, at Gage Park, the organizers bowed to political pressure from the mayor's office over the Pantychrist name and billed the band as The Punk Rock Mommies.

Former drummer Patty Christ revealed that she was confronted by a woman who found the Pantychrist band name offensive.
"Another kindergarten mom said, 'I saw your picture in the paper,' and I was happy. I thought, 'Oh, I'm famous! I'm famous!' But then she asked, 'Pantychrist? As a Christian, I find that very offensive.' So I said, 'As a human being, I find Christians very offensive.'"

Danyell DeVille's arrest led to front page print newspaper coverage in Canada along with television news feature segments. The story was picked up and reported on news sites and music blogs worldwide. With most outlets focusing almost exclusively on DeVille and Pantychrist, the overt sensationalism featured in some articles and the perceived fairness of reporting caused debate on comment threads and message boards.

Pantychrist songs include titles such as "Carve My Name Into Your Chest", "Bitch", "Suicide", "Rough Me Up", "The Cunt Song", "Clinically Insane", "Never Love Anything", "Psychopatho", "Leader Of The Damned", "Dirty Girls", "Fun To Fuck", and "Concussed". The group's lyrics have come under scrutiny for their liberal use of profanity, objectification and sensationalism and one reviewer referred to the songs as "good old punk rock cliches".

Pantychrist played during the intermission at a Stranglehold Wrestling event in July 2007. The Stranglehold shows were controversial for their violent hardcore Deathmatch style bouts and the main event this night was the Unlucky 13 Staplegun Match. A review of the show from Ontario Wrestlings Indy Elite stated "Pantychrist members Danyell and Amy Hell pretty much summed it up by declaring that they'd 'seen some pretty wild shit before, but nothing like this!'" and pictures from the event included a shot of Danyell DeVille posing with bloodied wrestler Ian Decay.

== Musical style ==
Pantychrists music has been most commonly identified with the hardcore punk riot grrrl movement and they combine elements of early 1980s UK hardcore punk with a mixture of early Washington DC style punk. The band has also added extreme metal textures through the use of double bass drumming and guitar palm muting. They have been compared to a variety of bands from a large spectrum of punk genres, including Plasmatics, Lunachicks, L7, Vice Squad, Devotchkas, Bikini Kill, Black Flag, Misfits, GG Allin, Dayglo Abortions, and many more. Lyrically, Pantychrist songs commonly focus on drug addiction, sexual freedom, manipulation and violence. They have shared the stage with bands such as Pansy Division, The UK Subs, Dayglo Abortions, D.O.A., Dickies, Random Killing, Bunchofuckingoofs, The Independents, The 3tards, Matadors, and many more. Hamilton, Canada has a strong punk rock heritage dating back to the late 1970s when it spawned the bands Teenage Head, Forgotten Rebels and Slander among others. Pantychrist members have cited these hometown bands as influences and Emma-O played in a reformed version of Slander.

== Critical response ==
Pantychrist have generally been received as talented musicians who offer something different from the typical all-female band genre due to their hardcore punk sound. Some reviews of the band's material have been over the top and colorful in nature, most notably those that appeared in Equalizing X Distort and Sleazegrinder. Sleazegrinder called the Never Love Anything CD "a raw n' bleeding album full of snotty, speedy punk tracks about cunts and spit and fucking, an acrimoniously filthy ode to everything worth carrying a disease". Equalizing X Distort proclaimed "In my perfect world PANTYCHRIST would be dressed as potty mouthed superheroes and would be battling the corrupt bastards that make life hell... Besides shooting rainbow coloured beer out their asses PANTYCHRIST would fight with an arsenal of profanity, fatal swirlies and bloody tampons to fuck with unjust assholes everywhere." A live review from The Gate stated "lead singer Danyell has the tonsils of a shrieking banshee, in fact I've never heard such a ferocious punk rawk shrieker in my 30 years of living".

Danielle DeVille was featured in an exhibit of paintings of female punk singers by artist Jennie Philpott entitled The Modern Day F Word. Philpott said "I aspire to represent female musicians in underground music who participate in these male dominated genres. In their musical contributions they prove that women have a place in this scene and through these paintings I give recognition to the importance of these women."
