= Complete Discography (disambiguation) =

Complete Discography is a 1990 album by Minor Threat.

Complete Discography may also refer to:

- Complete Discography, a 2012 album by Moss Icon
- The Complete Discography: 1993–1996, a 2000 album by Shotmaker
