= S.C.E.N.E. Music Festival =

Coordinates: 43.157°N 79.246°W

S.C.E.N.E. Music Festival (sometimes shortened to SCENE Fest) was a music festival founded by Chris "Cashmere" Wojtowicz, singer/songwriter of Revenge Of The Egg People/Rumble Devils, held in downtown St. Catharines, Ontario, Canada. The event was held annually beginning in 1995, usually in late June or early July. Originally a one-day event, the last event to date, in 2014, was extended to two days. The acronym "S.C.E.N.E." stands for Saint Catharines Event for New Music Entertainment, and is a play on words for "being scene", meaning being "with the trend". The festival was booked at several venues throughout St. Catharines, where bands of all genres performed, though it was known to showcase mostly hardcore groups. The first 2000 people to enter the festival received a compilation CD free of charge featuring songs by bands performing in the festival that year.

The first festival in 1995 drew about 800 people. The event in 2003, seven years later, was attended by around 2,500 and featured 85 bands, headlined by The Trews. The 2005 event received corporate sponsorship from Solo Mobile, which also sponsored the 2006 festival. MTV Canada was the presenting sponsor for 2007.

The festival features mostly alternative music and has hosted such groups such as Sydney, Alexisonfire, A Northern Chorus, Billy Talent, Boys Night Out, Cauterize, City and Colour, Ligeia, Crush Luther, Del tha Funkee Homosapien, Johnny Truant, Lights, Magneta Lane, Raising the Fawn, The Trews, The Strag and The Black Lungs.
