= Seeing Red =

Seeing Red or Seein' Red may refer to:

== Music ==
- Seeing Red (album), an album by LiveonRelease
- "Seein' Red" (Unwritten Law song), 2002
- "Seein' Red" (Dustin Lynch song), 2016
- "Seeing Red", a 1981 song by Minor Threat from First Two 7"s on a 12"
- "Seeing Red", a song by Killing Joke from the album Killing Joke (2003 album)
- "Seeing Red", a 2023 song by Architects from The Sky, The Earth & All Between
- Seein' Red (band), a hardcore punk band formed by the members of Lärm

== Film ==
- Seeing Red, a 1939 Vitaphone short comedy starring Red Skelton and a series of stage performances including by A. Robins ("The Banana Man")
- Seeing Red (1983 film), a documentary film
- Seeing Red (1992 film), an Australian film
- Seeing Red (2000 film), a British film featuring Jonny Clarke

== Television ==
- "Seeing Red" (Arrow), an episode of Arrow
- "Seeing Red" (Buffy the Vampire Slayer), a 2002 episode of Buffy the Vampire Slayer
- "Seeing Red" (CSI: Miami), an episode of CSI: Miami
- "Seeing Red" (Dexter), an episode of Dexter
- "Seeing Red" (The Flash), an episode of The Flash
- "Seeing Red" (Foster's Home for Imaginary Friends), a 2004 episode of Foster's Home for Imaginary Friends
- "Seeing Red" (The Mentalist), an episode of The Mentalist
- "Seeing Red" (Ms. Marvel), a 2022 episode of Ms. Marvel
- "Seeing Red" (Wentworth), an episode of Wentworth
- Hollyoaks: Seeing Red, a book about the TV series Hollyoaks

== See also ==
- Seeing Redd, a 2007 fantasy novel about Alice in Wonderland by Frank Beddor
- "Saw Red", a song by Sublime from their 1994 album Robbin' the Hood
