= Four Hundred Years =

American hardcore punk band

- Four Hundred Years performing live in 1998

Background information
- Also known as: 400 Years
- Origin: Tucson, Arizona, U.S.
- Genres: Post-hardcore; emo; screamo; hardcore punk
- Years active: 1996–2001
- Labels: The Great American Steak Religion; Yuletide; Lovitt
- Spinoffs: Bats & Mice
- Spinoff of: Groundwork; Policy of 3
- Members: Daron Hollowell; Dave Jackson; Eric "Bull" Gervasi; Ash Bruce
- Past members: Erin Housholder
- Website: fourhundredyears.bandcamp.com

Four Hundred Years (also spelled 400 Years) was an American post-hardcore band from Tucson, Arizona, that was active from 1996 to 2001. The band formed following the breakup of Tucson-based political hardcore punk outfit Groundwork, and later relocated to Richmond, Virginia, soon after. They toured the United States, Europe, and Japan several times often while performing alongside various bands such as Fugazi, Frodus, Sleepytime Trio, and many others. Their sound has been described as "a frenzy of hardcore intensity, built around simultaneously emotional and political themes," and they ultimately gained a cult following during their short existence as a result.

Four Hundred Years released three EPs (including splits with Sleepytime Trio and Seein' Red), three full-length albums, and a compilation album before disbanding after playing four East Coast shows in late 2000. The band's final lineup consisted of Daron Hollowell on guitar and vocals, Dave Jackson on guitar and vocals, Eric Gervasi (of Policy of 3) on bass, and Ash Bruce on drums. After their dissolution, Hollowell and Bruce joined the indie rock band Bats & Mice.

== Band members ==
=== Final lineup ===
- Daron Hollowell - vocals, guitar (1996–2001)
- Dave Jackson - vocals, guitar (1996–2001)
- Eric "Bull" Gervasi - bass (1999–2001)
- Ash Bruce - drums (1996–2001)

=== Past members ===
- Erin Housholder - bass (1996–1999)

== Discography ==
=== Studio albums ===
- Suture (1997, The Great American Steak Religion)
- Transmit Failure (1998, Lovitt)
- The New Imperialism (2000, Lovitt)

=== Extended plays ===
- Four Hundred Years / Sleepytime Trio (1997, Smooth Lips)
- Four Hundred Years (1997, Yultide)
- Four Hundred Years / Seein' Red (2001, SNC Empire)

=== Compilation albums ===
- Suture And Other Songs (1999, Lovitt)

=== Compilation appearances ===
- ABCs Of Punk (1997, Whirled)
- The 51 Comp (1997, Join The Team Player)
- Building & Lovitt Sampler 2002 (2002, Building & Lovitt)
- Building Records Presents 60 Songs (2003, Building)
- All My Idols (2020, PLUSMINUS)
