= Policy of 3 =

American emo band

- Also known as: Policy of Three
- Origin: Southern New Jersey, U.S.
- Genres: Emo; post-hardcore; hardcore punk
- Years active: 1989–1995; 2025–present
- Labels: Bloodlink; Old Glory; Ebullition
- Spinoffs: Four Hundred Years
- Members: Jeff Fisher; Adam Goldstein; Eric "Bull" Gervasi; Chris Fry
- Website: policyof3.bandcamp.com

Policy of 3 is an American emo band from Southern New Jersey, originally formed in 1989 under the name Matter Of Fact. They are cited as one of the first bands to help define the emo genre in the early 1990s, having been described in the Japanese press as "one of the most important bands" of that time. During their active years, they released two 7-inch EPs and a single full-length album, all of which were compiled into a complete discography release by Ebullition Records in 2005, titled Anthology.

== Musical style ==
Lyrically, Policy of 3's music expressed left-wing politics, which were accompanied by varied guitar tempos and introspection. They were influenced by the late 1980s Dischord sound, and have often been compared to similar early emo and post-hardcore acts such as Moss Icon and Still Life.

In the liner notes of the band's posthumous discography release, drummer Chris Fry wrote:

“Though Policy of 3 is probably considered an Emo band due to the era in which we existed, I will always think of us as a hardcore/punk band, because the band was inspired by the best elements of the New York City hardcore/punk and Dischord scenes of the late 1980's and early 1990's. However, the real motivation behind the band and the urgency directed to our music probably had more to do with the absurdities which were frequently and consistently expelled from the hardcore/punk scene before and during our early days as a band. This was a time of skinheads and the spectacular implosion of the straightedge scene on the East Coast when the self-righteous fell off the wagon. This was a time of Hare Krishna and vegan facism; two brief epochs which made so many punks look so stupid. This was a time style seemed to triumph over substance. This was a time of creeping commercialism and slick professionalism. This was a time when hardcore bands praised the Gulf War. This was a time when Punk Rock merged with metal then merged with Grunge. This record might sound hopelessly dated and irrelevant in the year 2004 (and beyond). However, at the time these songs represented an attempt to create something all our own, something that was removed from the machismo of the pit and the esoterica of post punk.”

== Band members ==
- Jeff Fisher – guitar, vocals (1989–1995, 2025–present)
- Adam Goldstein – guitar, vocals (1989–1995, 2025–present)
- Eric "Bull" Gervasi – bass (1989–1995, 2025–present)
- Chris Fry – drums (1989–1995, 2025–present)

== Discography ==
=== Studio albums ===
- Dead Dog Summer (1993, Old Glory)

=== Extended plays ===
- Policy Of 3 (1993, Bloodlink)
- American Woodworking (1995, Old Glory)

=== Compilation albums ===
- Anthology (2005, Ebullition)
- Policy Of 3 (2025, Stonehenge)

=== Compilation appearances ===
- The Spirit Of Solitude (1992, Yuletide)
- New Jersey Hardcore - A Common Cause (1993, Re-Action)
- Superpowers (1993, Troubleman Unlimited)
- All The President's Men (1994, Old Glory)
- Education Compilation (1995, The Mountain Collective For Independent Artists, Ltd.)
- XXX - Some Ideas Are Poisonous (1995, Ebullition)
- Kellercore (1995, Zieh Dich Warm An Tapes)
- Взорванное Небо No.1 (1997, Взорванное Небо)
