= The Great American Steak Religion =

- Founded: 1994
- Founder: Yannick Lorrain
- Genre: Hardcore punk Post-hardcore; Grindcore; Neo crust Emo
- Country of origin: Canada

The Great American Steak Religion was a Canadian independent record label which released many notable hardcore punk records from the likes of Shotmaker, His Hero Is Gone, and Chokehold during the 1990s. Originally named Daybreak Records and based out of legendary Ottawa punk venue 5 Arlington, founder Yannick Lorrain moved to Quebec City, and then to Montreal, taking the label with him and changing its name to Witch Hunt in 2000 and then Feral Ward in 2002. Many of the releases were issued only on vinyl and had "Verse #" etched on the matrix/runout, hence the tagging of each release as such. In 2004, Union Of Uranus' discography titled To This Bearer Of Truth was released on Feral Ward but "GASR-999" was etched on the matrix/runout as a throwback. The label's name is presumably a reference to the book Diet for a Small Planet, which refers to industrial production of meat for human consumption as the "Great American Steak Religion".

Magazine ad from around 1994

Ad from HeartattaCk Magazine 1996

Yannick is quoted in the book Punk Record Labels and the Struggle for Autonomy: The Emergence of DIY by Alan O'Connor as saying "On Great American Steak Religion there were Uranus, Drift, One Eyed God Prophecy. Brother bands, for the want of a better term. There was a little triangle between Ottawa, Quebec City and Sherbrooke. I was going to shows pretty much every weekend in those three cities. The bands were friends who would hang out."

Alexandre Julien's One Eyed God Prophecy Official Biography blog post recounts how the band connected with the label: "During one of their early practices, their friend Yannick Lorrain came by and after hearing their only three written songs, asked them to put out an LP on his label, The Great American Steak Religion. No doubt due to his label this band has kept a cult status over the years."

In an interview with Ken Sanderson of Prank Records for HeartattaCk magazine, American graphic artist Pushead included the Union of Uranus – Disaster By Design 2x7" in his list of favourite hardcore records.

The photo in the logo was taken by Shawn Scallen, whose band photos have appeared in magazines including Maximum Rocknroll, HeartattaCk, Punk Planet, and Spin, and who also took the photo on the cover of Shotmaker's The Crayon Club LP.

Reviews of the label's releases appeared in the popular punk zines of the time such as Maximum Rocknroll, HeartattaCk, Punk Planet, and Profane Existence, and the label was listed in the 1996 edition of Maximum Rocknroll's "Do It Yourself Resource Guide" Book Your Own Fuckin' Life 5.

== Releases as 'Daybreak Records' ==
- Double Think – The Scars Of Our Existence Will Be Remembered For Eternity 7" (1991)
- Numb – Fool's Progress LP (1992)
- Union of Uranus – Backhand cassette (1994)
- Failure Face – All Pain No Gain 7" (1994)

== Releases as 'The Great American Steak Religion' ==
- Uranus/Immoral Squad – Split 7" (1994) - Verse 1
- Reach Out – Self-titled 7" (1994) - Verse 2
- Shotmaker – The Crayon Club LP (1995) - Verse 3
- Drift – Self-titled 7" (1995) - Verse 4
- Union of Uranus – Disaster By Design 2x7" (1995) - Verse 5
- Franklin – Roy Is Dead 7" (1996) - Verse 6
- One Eyed God Prophecy – Self-titled LP (1996) - Verse 7
- Mine – Tetanus CD (1996) - Verse 8
- Chokehold – Content with Dying LP (1995) - Verse 9
- Four Hundred Years – Suture LP (1997) - Verse 10
- His Hero Is Gone/Union Of Uranus – Split EP 12" (1997) - Verse 11
- Hacksaw – Self-titled 7" (1997) - Verse 12
- His Hero Is Gone – The Plot Sickens: Enslavement Redefined LP (1998) - SOM-001

== See also ==
- List of record labels
