= The 3tards =

Canadian punk rock band formed 2001

- The 3tards perform at the Opera House in Toronto, opening for Green Jelly (July 4, 2008)

Background information
- Origin: Brampton, Ontario, Canada
- Genres: Punk rock, hardcore punk
- Years active: 2001–2009
- Labels: Wounded Paw, Spinerazor, Universal Music Canada
- Past members: John Romanelli; Gus Pynn; Andrew Fox; Eric Carr; Keith MacIntyre; Devin Fox; Mark Pezzelato
- Website: the3tards.com

The 3tards was a Canadian hardcore punk rock band that was formed in Brampton, Ontario, in 2001. The 3tards released three full-length albums – Greatest Hits Vol. 2, Crystal Balls, and 333: Halfway to Hell.

They were known for their provocative, vulgar and sexual lyrics, and political satire. Their shows featured live births, circumcisions and a mock gay wedding. They have been self described as "Canada's most politically incorrect punk band."

== History ==
=== Early years (2001–2003) ===
In 2001, vocalist John Romanelli (John Tard) formed The Trouser Snakes with John Tard's brother-in-law Rich on bass. At this point the band's name was changed to The 3tards, and they played their first and only show with this line-up at Harry Flashman's in Brampton. Shortly thereafter Rich left the band. Gus Pynn (Gus Tard), who had played with Toronto thrash band Sacrifice (and later rejoined it), was approached to play drums. This line-up played ten shows in the Toronto area and, in 2002, independently released a nine-track cassette called This Is A 3Tards Tape.

=== Greatest Hits, Vol. 2 (2003–2005) ===
In August 2003, Andrew Fox (Fox Tard), formerly of Toronto punk bands Delirium Tremor, Shitloads of Fuck-All and Los Goblynz, joined as bassist. It was at this time that the band was signed by Preston Sims of Toronto punk label Wounded Paw Records to record their first album, Greatest Hits, Vol. 2. Recorded over December 2003 and January 2004, the album included "3tarded", "Bigger The Better", and "Gay Heavy Metal Singer", an ode to Judas Priest vocalist Rob Halford.

During recording, the band was invited to play a benefit concert at Toronto club The Kathedral. This was the band's first large-scale exposure to an all-ages crowd, with several hundred teenagers in attendance. The 3tards also played with the Misfits, Dayglo Abortions, The Dickies, Ripcordz, and Agent Orange.

In 2004, the band formed the promotional company Little Dog, and began promoting their own local shows. They also began promoting local up-and-coming punk bands by organizing large-scale, youth-friendly events. The band either headlined the shows themselves or brought in touring acts, including D.O.A., Forgotten Rebels, and SNFU.

=== Crystal Balls (2005–2007) ===
In 2005, Wounded Paw merged with Spinerazor Records, which had a distribution partnership with Universal Music Canada. Through Universal, The 3tards recorded of their second album, Crystal Balls in the fall of 2005. Produced by Rob Sanzo at Signal 2 Noise Studio in downtown Toronto, the record was released in stores across Canada, and included the title track, Stuck On You, and Manrapist. It was 28 minutes long, and received generally negative reviews.

Also in 2005, the 3Tards made their second appearance on the variety show Ed & Red's Night Party.

On June 10, 2006, the band played inside the street-level studio of Toronto radio station, 102.1 The Edge. Hundreds of fans, mainly teenagers, showed up, far past the capacity for the small studio. The crowd spilled out onto Yonge Street, closing down a portion of the busy traffic artery, and resulting in the station being cited by local police.

One week later, the band opened for D.O.A. One Month later Eric Carr (Le Tard), formerly of Toronto punk legends Bunchofuckingoofs joined the band.

On December 16, 2006, Beetlejuice of the Howard Stern Show, MC'd and opened for The 3tards at The Kathedral. The show was filmed for DVD release as The 3tards & Beetlejuice: Live 3tardation. With the assistance of a licensed tattoo artist, Beetlejuice managed to tattoo half his name ("Beetle") across one half of John's chest during the show. He then entertained the crowd with a few jokes, introduced the 3tards set, and joined them in their anthem 3tarded.

=== 333: Halfway To Hell (2007–2013) ===
The 3tards spent the next two years touring across Canada. In the summer of 2007, Gus Pynn left the band, and was replaced by Keith MacIntyre (Keith Tard), formerly of The Antics. Work began immediately on the writing of the band's third album, 333: Halfway To Hell.

In 2008, for the first time, the band became a five-piece by adding Fox Tard's brother, Devin Shael Fox (Dee Tard), of Toronto bands Platypi and The New Effector, as rhythm guitarist.

== Oshawa incident ==
In June 2009, The 3tards played a benefit concert for breast cancer research at Memorial Park in Oshawa, along with The Groopies, Black Cat Attack and Caution Inc. Because of concerns about possible alcohol abuse and property damage, the event was at first considered "too risky" to be promoted on Oshawa's municipal website, but after receiving a number of letters from 3tards fans, the city council allowed the promotion.

On the day of the concert, limited promotion, a late start and pouring rain led to a small crowd, and no money was raised for cancer research. Bubble bath added to the fountain by audience members overflowed onto the park grounds. The 3tards commenced their set late, at approximately 7:30 pm; the event permit expired at 8:00 pm. During their fourth song, Durham Region police arrived to shut down the event. Because of noise complaints and an out-of-control crowd, power was cut to the stage, and some arrests were made. In spite of more letters from fans, the Oshawa City Council declined to add The 3tards to the city's July 1st Canada Day Lakeview Park concert event.

On July 19, 2009, the 3Tards headlined at The Kathedral, and announced that they were playing their last show. This was incorrect.

== Disbandment ==
In June of 2013, the 3tards appeared at the Bovine Sex Club to play music from their third and final album 333: Halfway To Hell. The 3tards then decided to break up. They performed their final show on July 18 at the Kathedral in Toronto, where Romanelli introduced his new band, the Terrorchargers. Fox began playing bass for Toronto pop rock band Crush Luther. Eric Carr started his own band with Gymbo Jak (of the Dayglo Abortions) call Grey Bush.

== Critical response ==
The 3tards' music shows has been compared to The Dead Milkmen and Forgotten Rebels, that is, punk with some metal, but with crude, repetitive lyrical themes. Their comedy style has been compared to Chevy Chase. The anarcho-punk zine Slug and Lettuce referred to Crystal Balls as "the worst record ever" and of the band said "They thank their wives. For all that is sacred in this world, I hope these knobs do not breed."

== Discography ==
- This Is A 3Tards Tape (Cassette), 2002, Independent
- The Greatest Hits Vol. 2, 2004, Wounded Paw Records
- Crystal Balls, 2005, Wounded Paw Records
- 333 Halfway To Hell, 2009, Wounded Paw Records
