= Seein' Red (band) =

Dutch hardcore punk band

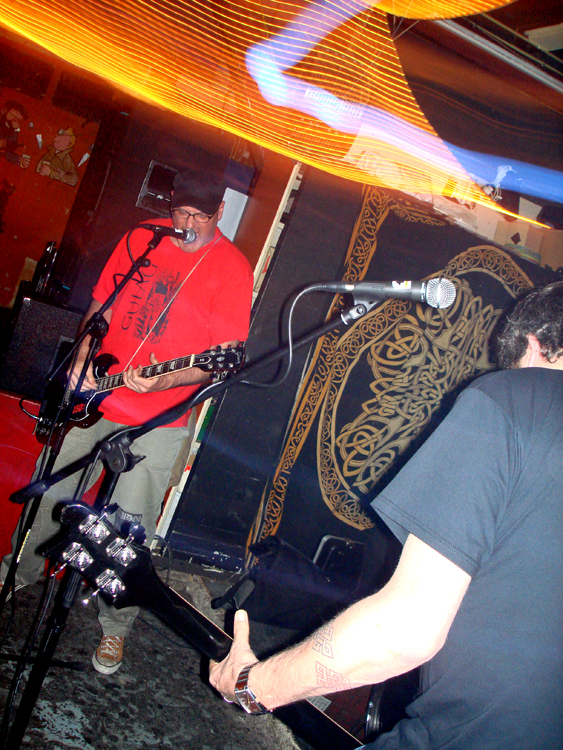
- Seein' Red performing live in 2008

Background information
- Origin: Amersfoort, Utrecht, Netherlands
- Genres: Hardcore punk; thrashcore; powerviolence; screamo
- Years active: 1988–present
- Labels: 625 Thrashcore; Armageddon; Ataxie Disques; Attack; Autoreverse; Axioma Promotions; Coalition; Day One; Deadlock; Ebullition; Equality; Hate; Kaal; Left Wing; Madskull; Opiate; Peculio Discos; Power Of Volume; Pre Chords; Rank; Red Punk Manifesto; SNC Empire; Stonehenge; Tadpole; Tomte Tumme Tott; Trabuc; Urban Alert; Way Back When; Wicked Witch
- Spinoffs: ManLiftingBanner
- Spinoff of: Lärm
- Members: Paul van den Berg; Jos Houtveen; Olav van den Berg
- Past members: Menno; Bart Griffioen
- Website: seeinred.bandcamp.com

Seein' Red is a Dutch hardcore punk band from Amersfoort, founded in 1988. Formed after the dissolution of Lärm, the band is known for their political lyricism and communist ideology.

Throughout their career, Seein' Red has released an extensive amount of full-length albums, EPs, and splits on various independent record labels from Europe and abroad. The band's lineup consists of all the members from Lärm, with the sole exception of Menno, who moved to Amsterdam in 1988 to finish his law school studies before the band had even recorded any music together.

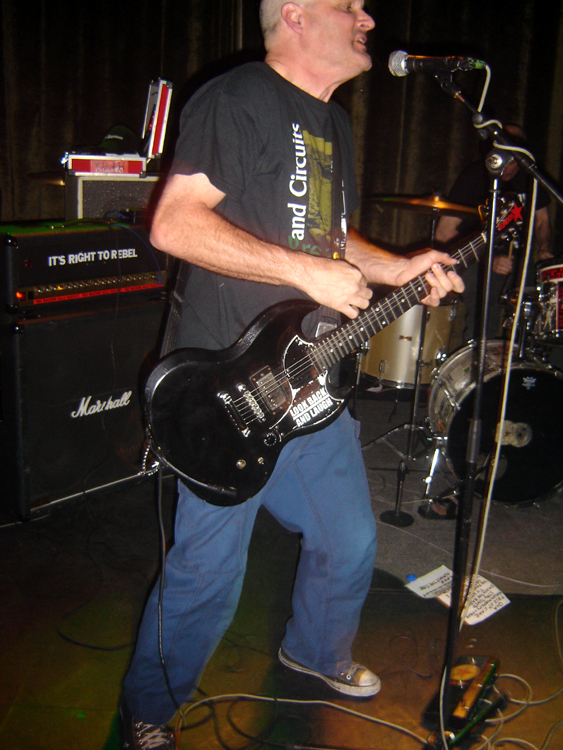
Seein' Red performing live in 2005

== Band members ==
=== Current lineup ===
- Paul van den Berg - guitar, vocals (1988–present)
- Jos Houtveen - bass, vocals (1988–present)
- Olav van den Berg - drums (1988–present)

=== Past members ===
- Menno - vocals (1988)
- Bart Griffioen - bass (1988–1989)

== Discography ==
=== Studio albums ===
- Seein' Red (1990, Pre Chords)
- Workspiel (1993, Rank)
- Lärm / Seein' Red - It's About Time... To Fight Back!!! (1997, Axioma)
- Mk Ultra / Seein' Red (1998, Coalition)
- Seein' Red / The Judas Iscariot (1998, Coalition)
- We Need To Do More Than Just Music (2005, Ebullition)
- FPO / Seein Red (2006, 625 Thrashcore)
- Past, Present, (In)tense (2023, Autoreverse)
- Refuse Resist (2024, Armageddon)

=== Extended plays ===
- Seein' Red (1989, Power Of Volume)
- Seein' Red / Sanctions (1991, Urban Alert)
- Seein' Red (1991, Self-released)
- It Takes Three To Fuck Shit Up (1993, Red Punk Manifesto)
- Seein' Red / Stack – Backbone (1995, Equality)
- Trefwoord Punk (1995, Left Wing)
- More Of The Same (1995, Wicked Witch)
- Marinus (1996, Ebullition)
- Seein' Red / Catweazle (1997, Wicked Witch)
- Öpstand / Seein' Red – Noise Grinding Violence / Seein' Red (1997, Stonehenge)
- Seein' Red / Vuur – Another Fine Punk Product (2001, Day One)
- Seein' Red / Human Alert (2001, Madskull)
- Four Hundred Years / Seein' Red (2001, SNC Empire)
- Live Amunition (2001, Ataxie Disques)
- Seein' Red / Shikari (2002, Deadlock)
- Seein' Red / The Now-Denial – Hope Vs. Disillusion (2002, Tomte Tumme Tott)
- Tegengif / Ziedend Van Woede (2004, Attack)
- Seein' Red / Hammer (2006, Armageddon)
- Framtid / Seein' Red* – Framtid / Seeinred (2007, Hate)
- Seein' Red (2009, Way Back When)
- Mihoen! / Seein Red* – Kots Op Nederland (2010, Opiate/Tadpole/Trabuc)
- Final Recordings (2015, Way Back When)
- Seein' Red Vs. Under Attack (2021, Way Back When/Autoreverse)
- Seein' Red / No Way (2024, Autoreverse)

=== Compilation albums ===
- Exhaustless Revolt / Seein' Red – Bonds Of Friendship (1991, Bonds Of Friendship Benefit Tapes!)
- Tour CD (1996, Kaal/Left Wing)
- This CD Kills Fascists (2004, Peculio Discos)
