= Bats & Mice =

American indie rock band

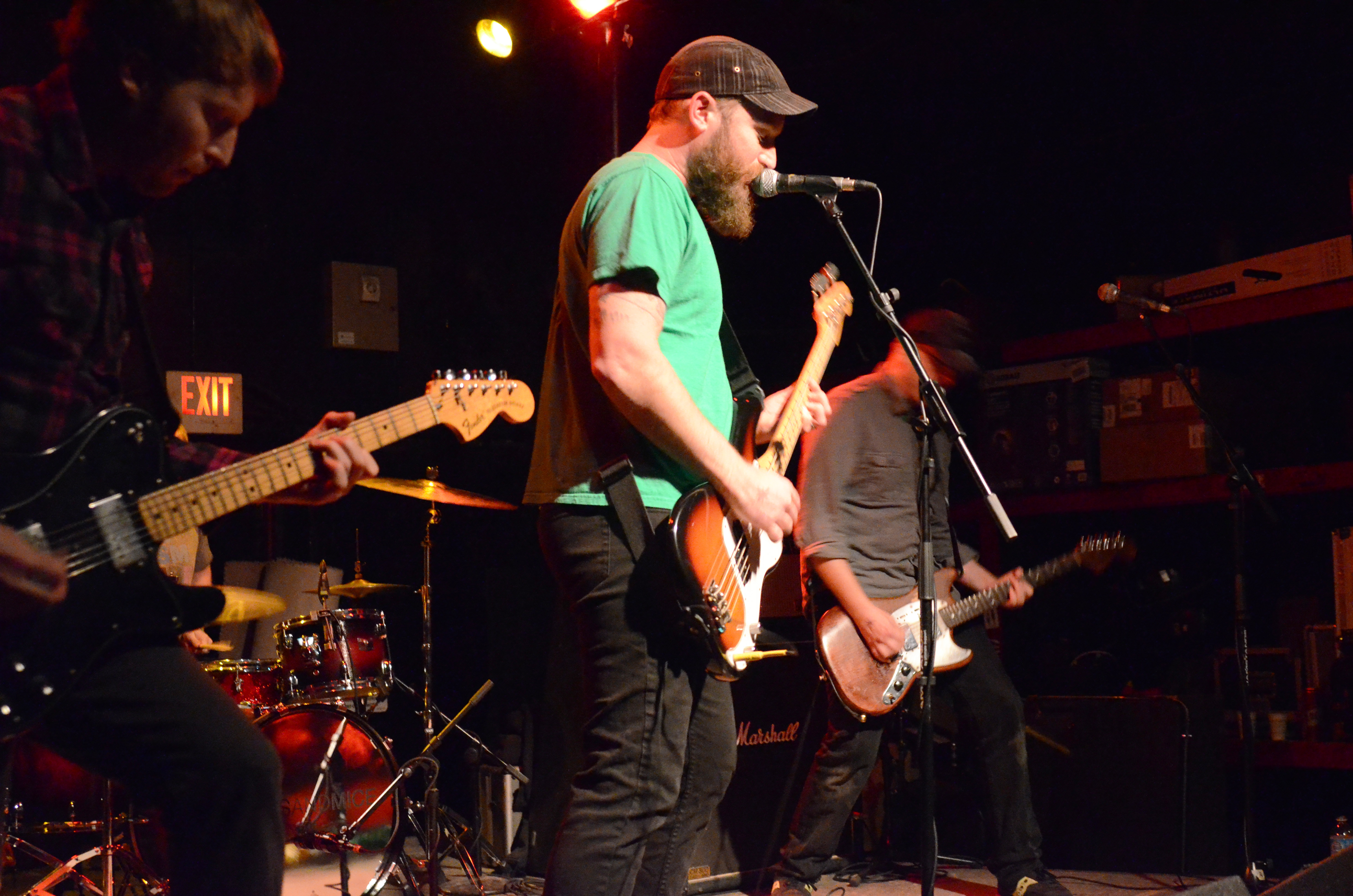
- Live on February 11, 2011, in Carrboro at the Local 506

Background information
- Genres: Noise pop
- Years active: 2000–present
- Label: Lovitt
- Members: David NeSmith; Ben Davis; Mark Oates
- Past members: Jonathan Fuller; Daron Hollowell; Ash Bruce; Jay Murphy; Luke Herbst
- Website: batsandmice.com

Bats & Mice is an American indie rock band formed in 2000 by Sleepytime Trio members Jonathan Fuller, David NeSmith, and Ben Davis. This line-up produced Bats & Mice's first work, a self-titled EP released on Lovitt Records in fall 2000.

With Bats & Mice members all involved in other bands, such as Milemarker and Rah Bras, the band moved along at a slower pace. Daron Hollowell, formerly of band Four Hundred Years, joined the group. Jonathan left the group to focus on his other bands, Engine Down and Denali, and was replaced by Hollowell's former Four Hundred Years bandmate Ash Bruce.

The band recorded a full-length album entitled Believe It Mammals, which was released on Lovitt in the spring of 2002, followed by touring with acts like Fugazi, Ted Leo and the Pharmacists, 90 Day Men, Denali, Rah Bras, and Gregor Samsa.

After Hollowell and Bruce left the group to pursue a new project Jay Murphy took over on drums, followed by Luke Herbst, who helped the band record Bats & Mice's second EP, A Person Carrying a Handmade Paper Bag is Considered as a Royal Person. Herbst left the band in 2004 for Oakland, CA, to join Totimoshi, and Jonathan Fuller briefly rejoined the group.

In April 2010 the band announced on their MySpace page that Mark Oates had replaced Fuller as drummer for the band. A new EP is set to be released in June, followed by an East Coast tour. In February of 2012, the band recorded the bulk of what was to be their second full-length album, but life changes derailed the process.

In March 2024, the band announced the release of their long-gestating second full-length PS: Seriously and accompanying single "Worst Time."

== Discography ==
Album	Year	Label
S/T EP	2000	Lovitt
Believe it Mammals	2002	Lovitt
A Person Carrying a Handmade Paper Bag is Considered as a Royal Person	2004	Lovitt
