= Crisis of Faith =

Role-playing game supplement

Crisis of Faith is a supplement published by Dream Pod 9 in 1997 for the science fiction mecha role-playing game Heavy Gear.

== Publication history ==
In 1994, Dream Pod 9 published the science fiction role-playing game Heavy Gear. After publishing several supplements dealing with advanced weaponry and geographical information about the Terra Nova setting, they released Crisis of Faith in 1997, a 8 in × 5 in (200 mm × 130 mm) 112-page softcover book that was the first in a series to reveal the events on Terra Nova leading up to the current Heavy Gear storyline.

The history is presented as a series of conversations, government memos, excerpts from personal diaries and news stories.

== Reception ==
The reviewer from Pyramid #30 (March/April, 1998) stated that "Crisis of Faith advances the Heavy Gear timeline with excerpts of source material and snippets of fiction detailing or hinting at great changes on Terra Nova, the colony world that Heavy Gear is set on. The format of the book is very pleasing to the eye and easy to read, and complemented with excellent illustrations."

In the May 1998 edition of Dragon (Issue #247), Chris Pramas thought the small size of the book might make it less visible on store shelves, and the high price ($20 in 1998) was potentially off-putting, but he found the production values and interior art excellent, saying, "One look inside, however, is enough to ensure that you won‘t put it down. Thirty-two of the pages are full color, and the whole thing is up to DP9’s usual excellent level of graphic design." He also noted that "While there are no game statistics of any kind, the book is a gold mine of scenario ideas." Pramas did find the contents relatively "inaccessible" to new players, who might have trouble following along with the notable people, the Terra Nova setting and events. But he concluded by giving the book an above average rating of 5 out of 6, saying, "Crisis of Faith... is lovingly crafted and tells a compelling story. Those who have longed for more information on the world of Terra Nova should pick this up, despite the hefty price.... With this release, Dream Pod 9 has really made Terra Nova live and breathe."

== Reviews ==
- Shadis #48 (June, 1998)
- Backstab #8
