= Humanifesto =

Canadian hardcore punk band

- Origin: Montreal, Quebec, Canada
- Genres: Hardcore punk
- Years active: 2004–2011
- Label: Koi Records
- Past members: Phil Campeau; Franck Chevrier; Danarky; Justin Santora; Andrew McGrath; Rich Bouthillier
- Website: myspace.com/humanifesto

Humanifesto was a Canadian hardcore punk music group from Montreal, formed in 2004 by singer / bassist Phil Campeau and singer / guitarist Franck Chevrier, and which was active between 2004 and 2011. Over the years, the band would perform over 100 shows in the Eastern Canadian area, sharing the stage with notable acts including Propagandhi, Strike Anywhere, The Video Dead, Chixdiggit, and Hostage Life, and would go on to record two albums, their debut A Declaration of Intent, followed by The Infamous as well as a split 7-inch vinyl EP All These Lives and a NOFX tribute album, released on 7-inch vinyl, titled Don't Eat Meat.

== History ==
=== 2004 - Band formation and recording : A Declaration of Intent ===
Soon after Phil Campeau and Franck Chevrier formed the band in 2004, the band quickly wrote and recorded their first album, A Declaration Of Intent, with the help of The Sainte Catherines' Rich Bouthillier filling in on drums, and their guitarist Marc-Andre Beaudet behind the mixing console. Shortly after the independent release of A Declaration Of Intent, Rich Bouthillier's busy schedule with The Sainte Catherines made it clear he could not be Humanifesto's full-time drummer. Not long thereafter, former bandmate of Franck Chevrier's, Andrew McGrath was recruited on drums, and the band's longest-lasting line-up was established.

=== 2006 : All These Lives ===
The band's first EP consisted of the first three songs written with the band's new line up – "All These Lives", "Yesterday's Headlines", and "Sitting Duck Hunt" – and was recorded at the beginning of 2006. The title song "All These Lives" was later released as a single on the Make Trade Fair compilation album, released by Lower Left Records to raise awareness of alternatives to sweatshop labour. The two additional tracks, "Yesterday's Headlines" and "Sitting Duck Hunt", were released on a split 7-inch vinyl with I Am The Cartographer, on Hip Kid Records in August 2007.

=== 2006 : Don't Eat Meat ===
In mid-2006, the band returned into the studio to record a new EP, entitled Don't Eat Meat. This project was a tribute to NOFX's Fuck The Kids EP, performing the music arrangements and vocal melodies from the NOFX disc, but replacing the original lyrics with Humanifesto-style left-wing political ones. After shelving the project for a year while working on other projects, Fat Mike of NOFX authorized Humanifesto to release the project on 7-inch vinyl. This disc was issued in early 2008 by KOI Records in Texas.

=== 2007–2010 : The Infamous ===
The band's second album was titled The Infamous (not to be mistaken with The Infamous studio album by Mobb Deep). The album was unique in its concept, as every song title on the album including the album title itself, were an anagram of the band's name. Notable song titles included on this release were "Oh, Meat Is Fun!", "US Anthem of I", "Some Thai Fun", "Atheism of UN", and "South Famine". The original version of this album was written, recorded and mixed between 2007 and 2008, with the band's established three-piece line up (Phil Campeau, Franck Chevrier, Andrew McGrath) but due to growing discord between band members and friction with the studio where it had been recorded, the recording never made it to mastering, and was eventually shelved and never released. This episode led to Andrew McGrath's departure from the band, and subsequent relocation to Malta in late 2009. It was not before a shuffle in line up, which saw Danarky join the band on lead guitar, and Justin Santora sit in on drums, that The Infamous was re-recorded and released on Koi Records in 2010. In May 2010, and in support of The Infamous the band toured Quebec and Ontario with bandmates Society's Ills, before drummer, Justin Santora, was forced to leave Montreal and return home to Chicago.

=== 2010 : "Elegy" ===
The last official Humanifesto recording was a song called "Elegy", the drum tracks for which were recorded by Andrew McGrath overseas in March 2010 at the Temple Studios in Malta.

=== Break-up ===
The last Humanifesto show was on June 12, 2010, in Montreal at Cafe Chaos, and featured Andrew McGrath back behind the drums. It was seen as a serendipitous reunion and highlighted an end to the discord, which had permeated much of the period between 2007 and 2008.

In January 2011, it was announced via the Humanifesto Facebook page that the band would be "moving on to new projects". The band has not recorded or performed since.

== Before and after Humanifesto ==
=== Before ===
Phil Campeau was formerly a member of Montreal punk band First Impression, Franck Chevrier and Andrew McGrath were originally members of Highwire (circa 2001) and Strike Nine (circa 2003) and Justin Santora's former recording project was called I Am The Cartographer.

=== After ===
Danarky continues to play guitar and sing in Society's Ills. Andrew McGrath plays the drums in ManaTapu, a Malta-based ska / reggae band.

In March 2013, Chevrier and Campeau, alongside Scott Loney and Yves Boulay, formed new project, Addington Lennox. Their first album, At Sixes and Sevens, featured McGrath on drums and was recorded at Bridgehead Studio in Montreal, in February 2014. The album was independently released in September 2014.

== Discography ==
=== Albums ===
- A Declaration Of Intent (2005) on Lower Left Records
- The Infamous (2010) on KOI Records

=== EPs ===
- Split 7-inch vinyl (2007) with I Am The Cartographer on Hip Kid Records
- Don't Eat Meat (2008) on KOI Records (a NOFX-authorized vinyl-only tribute to Fuck The Kids)

=== Compilations ===
- Let The Battle Begin (2005) Fight The Mentality Records - Included demo version of "Artificial Need"
- Make Trade Fair (2006) Lower Left Records - Included "All These Lives"
- Montreal Localz (2006) (Independent compilation) - Included "Sitting Duck Hunt"

== See also ==
- List of bands from Canada
