= Crush Luther =

- Origin: London, Ontario, Canada
- Genres: Pop rock
- Years active: 2004–2011
- Label: High 4 Records
- Members: Luther Mallory; Matt Leitch; PJ Herrick; Shael Fox
- Past members: Bodan Mulholland; Giggi Bongard; Brent Mills; Dustin Wood; Ryan Snyder

Crush Luther was a Canadian pop-rock band based in Toronto, best known for their 2007 single "City Girl" and 2010 single "A Light".

== History ==
The band formed in London, Ontario, in 2002, with members from both Uxbridge, Ontario, and Arnprior, Ontario. The original four members (Luther Mallory, Giggi Bongard, Brent Mills and Bodan Mulholland) worked together to build a strong catalogue of songs and sets before setting out to play shows in the Southern Ontario region. Towards the end of the same year, guitar player Matt Leitch (a.k.a. Matt Fury) joined the band after learning the entire set the day before his first appearance with the band.

Since 2004, the band has released a 12-song demo in several formats and pressings. In late 2006, Crush Luther signed with Toronto-based High 4 Records (owned and operated by Darrin Pfeiffer of Goldfinger), Their self-titled album was released February 13, 2007. It was recorded at Iguana Studios, Pocket Studios, and Crush Luther Studios; it was produced by vocalist Luther Mallory, and engineered by Brent Mills. The first single from the album was "City Girl", which included a music video that was popular on both MuchMusic and MuchMoreMusic. It also reached number one on the MuchMoreMusic Top 10 countdown. A second single, "The Cools", was released to radio and the music video was in heavy rotation on MuchMusic.

Crush Luther appeared on several stints of the Warped Tour (2005, 2006, and 2007) in both Canada and the United States.

After a brief hiatus, the band reformed in 2007 with a new line up: Luther Mallory on vocals and rhythm guitar, Matt Leitch on lead guitar, Dustin Wood (formerly of Grand:PM) on bass guitar, and PJ Herrick, late of Forty Cent Fix on drums. Ryan Snyder later replaced Dustin Wood on bass, rhythm guitarist Shael Fox (a.k.a. Dee Tard of The 3tards, replaced Ryan Snyder).

Crush Luther's second album, Some People Have No Good To Give, was released in 2009. The first single from the album was "A Light"; its video reached #2 on the MuchMore Top 10 Countdown. Videos for the second single "28" and third single "I Was Electric" also charted on the countdown and received favourable rotation on Much Music.

After disbanding in 2010, the members briefly played in the band, Fortune, with former INXS frontman, J.D. Fortune.

== Discography ==
Date of release	Title	Record label	Notes
2007	Crush Luther	High 4 Records	Digital, Physical (CD)
October 13, 2009	Some People Have No Good To Give	High 4 Records	Digital, Physical (CD and LP)

=== Singles ===
- 2007: "City Girl"
- 2007: "The Cools"
- 2007: "When We Were Golden"
- 2009: "A Light"
- 2010: "28"
- 2010: "I Was Electric"
