= Banlieue Rouge =

- Origin: Longueuil, Quebec Canada
- Genre: Punk rock
- Years active: 1989-1998
- Labels: Division Nada, Tir groupé
- Spinoffs: Akuma, Corrigan Fest
- Past members: Jean-François Désourdy; Safwan Hamdi; Sylvain David; Xavier Pétermann

Banlieue Rouge was a Punk rock band from Longueuil, Quebec, active from 1989 to 1998. They toured internationally, performed at festivals, and released seven albums. In 2015, the band reformed for a reunion concert at Rock in Montebello, Quebec and released one more album.

== History ==
Banlieue Rouge (translated as "Red Suburb") was formed in 1989 in Longueuil, and named for the Parisian suburban communes dominated by the French Communist Party. They were heavily influenced by French punk rock bands such as Bérurier Noir, and all of their lyrics were in French. The original members were Safwan Hamdi (vocals, rhythm guitar), Sylvain David (guitar), and bassist Xavier Pétermann. They began with a drum machine, but eventually replaced that with drummer Jef (Jean-François Désourdy).

The band's debut album, En Attendant Demain was released in 1990. Their second album was Que Tombent Les Masques, released in 1992. They gained considerable popularity in France and Quebec with the release of their third studio album, 1993's Engrenages.

In 1998, Banlieue Rouge participated in the Pollywog Tour in Canada, with headliners Anthrax.

They released two more albums: Au Coeur De La Tempête in 1994 and, in 1996, Sous Un Ciel Écarlate.

In late 1998, after four full-length albums (plus one live and one best-of) and ten years of touring in America and Europe, the band broke up. Xavier went on to form Corrigan Fest, later joined by Sylvain. They played traditional Celtic music mixed with punk. Later Petermann produced video games and Sylvain taught literature at Concordia University. Safwan went on to form Akuma, an angrier, louder bi-lingual hardcore punk band, and later operated a tattoo studio.

On May 25, 2003, Banlieue Rouge made its entire catalogue available for free downloading.

In 2015, Banlieue Rouge reunited to perform at Montebello Rock, a.k.a. Amnesia Rockfest, in Montebello, Quebec. A live album Sans Reddition, was recorded at the event and released in 2016.

== Discography ==
Studio Albums

- En attendant demain (Waiting for Fomorrow) (1990), Division Nada
- Que tombent les masques (May the Masks Fall) (1992), Tir groupé
- Engrenages (Gears) (1993), Tir groupé
- Sous un ciel écarlate (Under a Scarlet Sky) (1996), Tir groupé

Live Albums

- Au cœur de la tempête (In the Heart of the Storm) (1994), Tir groupé
- Sans Reddition (Without Surrender) (2016), Independent

Compilations

- Division Nada I (1991), Division Nada
- Best of Banlieue Rouge (1995), Tir groupé
- Banlieue Rouge (1997), Mad Butcher Records (Germany)
