= Akuma (band) =

Canadian punk rock band formed 1998

- Origin: Montreal, Quebec
- Genres: Punk rock
- Years active: 1998−2008
- Labels: Union Label Group, Pavillon Noir
- Spinoff of: Banlieue Rouge
- Past members: Safwan Hamdi; Simon; Sylva; Mark; Sébastien; Yannick
- Website: http://www.akuma.ca

Akuma was a Canadian punk rock band from Montreal, Quebec, founded in 1998 by former Banlieue Rouge member Safwan Hamdi. According to a post on the Rock My World Canada Facebook page, "the band distinguishes itself through its opposition to neoliberalism, both through its lyrics and through its actions."

== History ==
The original line-up consisted of Safwan Hamdi (guitar and vocals), 'Simon' (bass and backing vocals), 'Sylva' (drums), and 'Mark' (guitar and backing vocals). This line-up recorded the group's first album, 100 Démons, released in 2001. Following the release, Mark and Simon left the band and were replaced by 'Sébastien' (bass) and 'Yannick' (guitar).

In 2004, the band released the album Subversion through Pavillon Noir.

In 2006, they released ...Des Cendres Et Du Désespoir (Ashes and Despair).

One of Akuma's songs appeared on a compilation released by the 1999 Festival Polliwog, an annual Montreal punk-metal festival. The band also performed at the Festival d'été de Québec and the 2001 Vans Warped Tour. In 2002, they toured France with Tagada Jones and Oberkampf. Akuma's final performance took place in 2008. While their website remains active, there have been no updates since that year.

== Discography ==
- 100 Démons (1998), Union Label Group
- Subversion (2004), Pavillon Noir
- ...Des Cendres Et Du Désespoir (2006), Pavillon Noir
