= Shotmaker (band) =

Canadian post-hardcore/emo band

- Origin: Ottawa, Ontario, Canada
- Genres: Post-hardcore; emo; screamo
- Years active: 1993–1996
- Past members: Matt Deline; Tim McKeough; Nick Pye

Shotmaker was a Canadian post-hardcore/emo group formed in 1993 by Matt Deline, Tim McKeough and Nick Pye in Belleville and Ottawa, Ontario.

== History ==
Shotmaker's catalogue comprises a demo tape, three 7"s, two full-length LP's and a 12" split EP.

The group parted ways in 1996, but released their double CD retrospective The Complete Discography: 1993–1996 in 2000, comprising almost the entirety of their recorded material (not including a Demo Tape), including several tracks exclusive to compilations and three unreleased songs. 33 of the 43 tracks were lifted straight from vinyl due to DAT tapes being lost.

Shotmaker's members went on to play in such bands as the short lived 30 Second Motion Picture, Three Penny Opera, and The Grey. Matt is currently in The Dark Plains.

In October 2023, the band release of "a moment in time: 1993–1996", a 3xLP box set collection.

== Legacy ==
The band Controller.Controller took their name from a song on Mouse Ear [Forget-Me-Not].

== Discography ==
Albums

Title	Date of Release	Label
The Crayon Club	1994	The Great American Steak Religion
Mouse Ear [Forget-Me-Not]	1996	Troubleman Unlimited

Singles/EP's

Title	Date of Release	Label
Little Kid 7"	1993	Kung-Fu Manticore
Bull 7"	1994	Kung-Fu Manticore
Split 7" w/ Watershed	1994	Vital Communications
Split 12" w/ Maximillian Colby	1995	Nervous Wreck Kids

Compilation Contributions

Song title	Compilation Title	Date of Release	Label
Pilot	All The President's Men	1994	Old Glory Records
7:14	heartattack No. 10	1996	Ebullition Records

Compilations

Title	Date of Release	Label
The Complete Discography: 1993–1996	2000	Troubleman Unlimited
a moment in time: 1993–1996	2023	Solid Brass Records
