= Chokehold (band) =

Canadian hardcore punk band

- Origin: Hamilton, Ontario, Canada
- Genres: Hardcore punk, metalcore
- Years active: 1990–1996, 2015–present
- Labels: Good Fight, Cosmic Note, A398 Recordings, Rhythm of Sickness, Bloodlink, The Great American Steak Religion, Conquer the World, Grinding Edge
- Members: Chris Logan; Josh Fletcher; Matt Beckman
- Past members: Jeff Beckman; Sandy Robertson; Jon Sharron
- Website: Chokehold on Facebook

Chokehold is a Canadian vegan straight edge hardcore punk band from Hamilton, Ontario. They were active from 1990 to 1996, and came together again for a reunion tour in 2015, and five dates in Japan in September 2016. They released their third album in 2019.

== History ==
Chokehold was formed in 1990 in Hamilton. Their first release More Than Ever was in 1991. This was followed in 1992 by a split EP with Crisis of Faith and the Life Goes On EP. Their rise in popularity paralleled that of other vegan straight edge bands such as Earth Crisis, and hardline bands like Vegan Reich and Raid.

In 1993, Chokehold released the Prison of Hope LP through American label Conquer the World Records and sounded their own record label Structure Records to release music by Florida band Bloodlet. They released their next EP, 1994's Instilled, on Philadelphia's Bloodlink Records. This EP featured some of their most political material to date, notably the anti-religious song "Anchor", the anti-homophobia song "Mindset", and their manifesto on Human/Earth/Animal Liberation "Burning Bridges".

They followed this in 1995 with their second LP, Content With Dying. This album contained "Not a Solution", a vehemently pro-choice hardcore song.

They signed in 1996 to Germany's Mad Mob Records and recorded four new songs, which were to be released as a split CD with Feeding the Fire. But, after a European tour in 1996, the band decided to break up. They played their last show in March at the New Bedford Festival in Massachusetts. These four songs were released as a self-titled EP on Jawk Records the following year. Rhythm of Sickness Records posthumously released a split 12" vinyl with Left For Dead; Redstar Records later released one of their unreleased covers on the compilation The Sound and the Fury. Members went on to play in such bands as Brutal Knights, Left for Dead, Haymaker, Our War, SeventyEightDays and Funerary.

In 2015, remixed versions of the band's albums Prison of Hope and Content with Dying were re-released. The band reunited and began touring in support of the new releases. Comments by a band member and a subsequent violent confrontation at their first performance in Toronto led to allegations of racism and transphobia, which were denied by the band members and their label.

== Members ==
Current members

- Chris Logan – vocals
- Josh Fletcher – guitar (later), bass
- Matt Beckman – drums

Former members

- Jeff Beckman – guitar
- Jon Sharron – bass
- Sandy Robertson – guitar, bass

== Discography ==
Studio albums

- Prison of Hope (1993, Conquer the World)
- Content with Dying (1995, Bloodlink/The Great American Steak Religion)
- With This Thread I Hold On (2019, Good Fight)

EPs, singles and demos

- The Whole World Is an Addiction (1991, self-released)
- Life Goes On (1992, Arm's Reach)
- More Than Ever (1991, self-released)
- Instilled (1994, Bloodlink)
- Tooth and Nail (1997, Jawk)
- We're Not Gonna Take It (2015, A389)

Compilation albums

- Prison Of Hope (1994, Conquer The World)
- Chokehold (2015, A389)
- Sell It For What It's Worth Box Set (2016, A389)
- Discography (2016, Cosmic Note)

Splits

- Chokehold / Crisis of Faith (1992, Grinding Edge)
- Chokehold / Left for Dead (1996, Rhythm of Sickness)

Compilation appearances

- Reproach (1998, Ugly Pop) – Nothing Negative Approach cover
- The Sound and the Fury (1999, Redstar) – Kickback Breakdown cover

== See also ==
- Animal rights and punk subculture
