= Dayglo Abortions =

Canadian hardcore punk and metal band

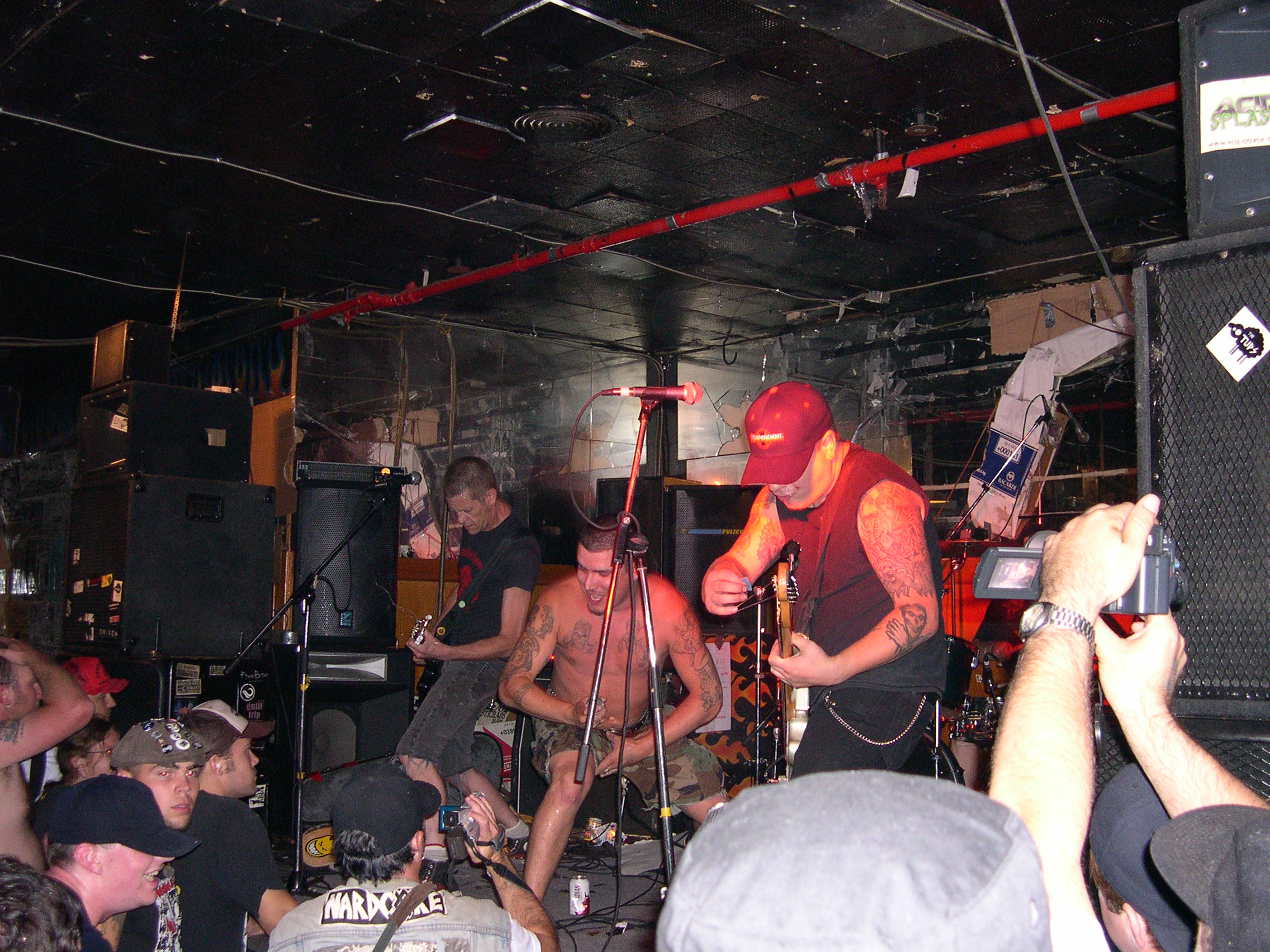
- Dayglo Abortions performing at The Cobalt Hotel in Vancouver, August 2004

Background information
- Origin: Victoria, British Columbia, Canada
- Genres: Punk rock, hardcore punk, crossover thrash, heavy metal
- Years active: 1979–present
- Labels: Fringe Product; God Records; Unrest Records
- Members: Murray "The Cretin" Acton; Mike Jak "Blind" Marc; Matt Fiorito

The Dayglo Abortions (sometimes abbreviated to DGA) are a Canadian hardcore punk and metal band from Victoria, British Columbia. Their lyrics reflect a genre-typical disregard for societal norms. The band was formed in 1979 under the name, Sikphuxz. This project recorded some demo material that was later released by Canadian label, Supreme Echo. At some point between May 1980 and 1981 they re-formed the band as Dayglo Abortions and released their first album in 1981. The band's biography, Argh Fuck Kill: The Story of the Dayglo Abortions, by the author Chris Walter, was published in 2010 by Gofuckyerself Press. Gymbo Jak, the lead singer from 1994 to 2007, also sang for the Toronto-based Maximum RNR.

== History ==
=== Legal trouble ===
The band is known for its graphic album covers. In 1988, a police officer in Nepean, Ontario instigated a criminal investigation of the Dayglos after his daughter brought home a copy of Here Today, Guano Tomorrow. Obscenity charges were laid against the group's record label, Fringe Product Inc. along with the label's record store, Record Peddler. The DayGlo Abortions were not charged. Following a trial, a jury found that the band's material was not obscene.

On August 30, 2025, both Acton and Fiorito were arrested in Ohio and charged with drug possession.

=== Politics ===
On their 2004 album, the Dayglos showed a new-found political awareness. Holy Shiite has song titles such as "America Eats Her Young," "Christina Bin Laden," "Scientology," and "Where's Bin Laden?".

== Band members ==
=== Current ===
- Murray Acton "The Cretin", lead guitar and vocals, 1979–1994, 1998–present
- Mike Jak, guitar, 1986–1994, 1997, 2009–present
- "Blind" Marc, drums, 2011–present
- Matt Fiorito, guitar, 2015–present

=== Former ===
- "Jesus Bonehead", drums, 1979–2010
- Trevor "Spud" Hagen, bass, 1979–1999
- "Gymbo Jak", vocals, 1994–2007
- "Hung Jak", guitar, 1995–2000
- "Willy Jak", bass guitar, 2000–2018
- "Nev the Impailer", guitar, 1986–1989 (Died – 2013)
- "Squid", lead guitar, 1994–1996
- "Wayne Gretsky", guitar, 1985–1986

== Discography ==
=== Studio albums ===
- Out of the Womb (1981)
- Feed Us a Fetus (1986)
- Here Today, Guano Tomorrow (1988)
- Two Dogs Fucking (1991)
- Little Man in the Canoe (1995)
- Corporate Whores (1996)
- Death Race 2000 (1999)
- Holy Shiite (2004)
- Armageddon Survival Guide (2016)
- Hate Speech (2021)
- Upside Down World "EP" (2023)

=== Compilations ===
- Stupid World, Stupid Songs (1998)
- Live A.D. (2011)
- Wake Up It's Time To Die "EP" (2019)
- Fuck The World, If It Can't Take A Joke

"Tribute Album" (2019)

=== Promo Videos ===
- Here Today Guano Tomorrow
- Skatans Skids
- I Love My Mom

== See also ==
- List of bands from Canada
