= Bunchofuckingoofs =

Canadian hardcore punk band

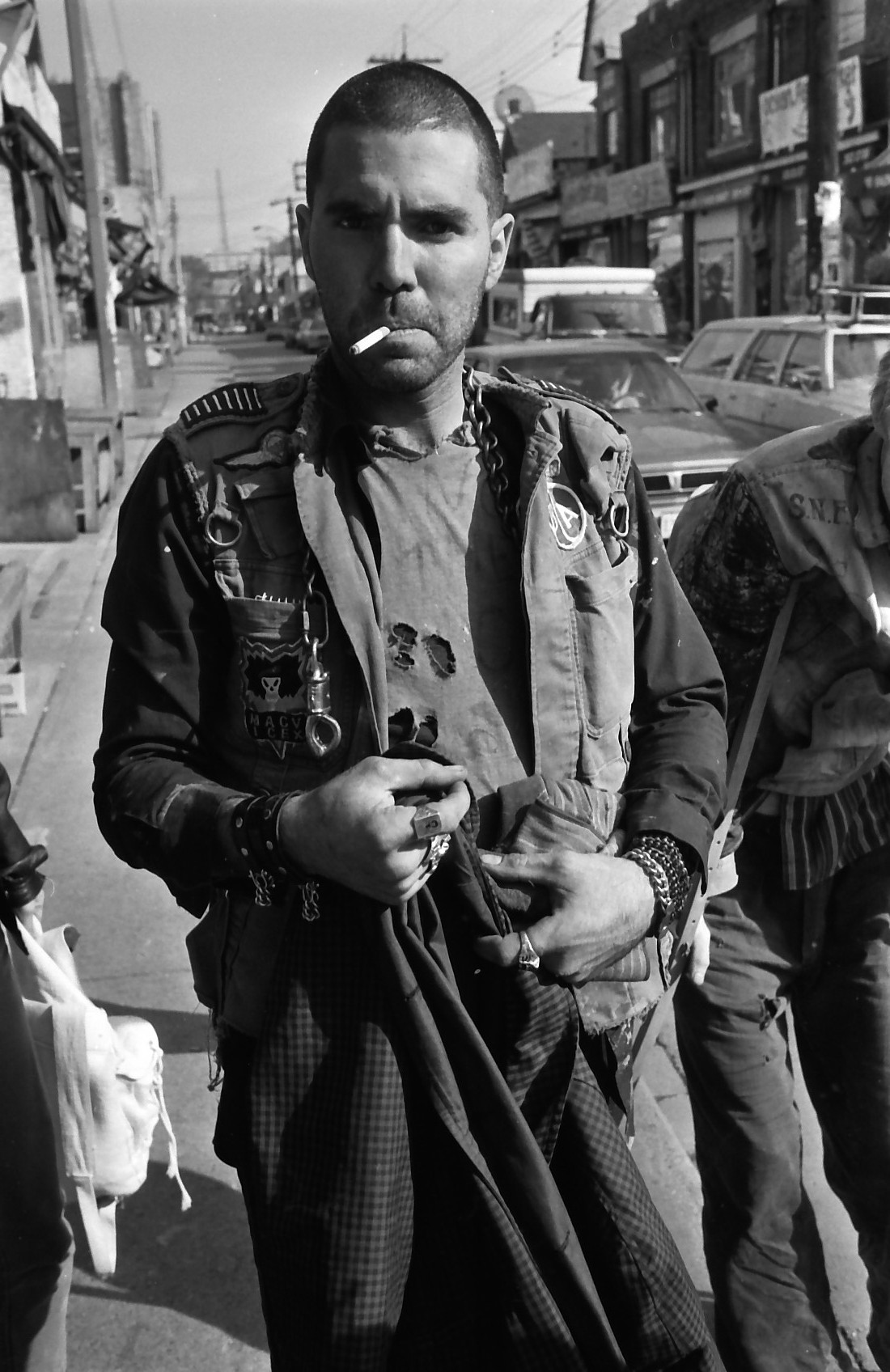
- Crazy Steve Goof of bunchofuckingoofs, 1988

Background information
- Origin: Toronto, Ontario, Canada
- Genres: Punk rock, hardcore punk
- Years active: 1983–2008, 2011
- Labels: Fringe Product, Back Alley Records, God Records, Raw Energy Records, A&M Records
- Past members: Crazy Steve Goof; Scrag aka By-T; Maddog; Bambi aka Jules al-Qaetor; Goose aka Gregoose; Fetus; Mike Murderio; Scumbag Merrick; Godzilla; Cisco aka Dr. Valdez; The Tepperman Brothers; T-Bag; Baron Wasteland; John Grove aka Yngwie Grovestien; Terry Rubberstone; Mike Anus Jak; Thor Hammersen; Stompin Al Miller; Steds Dead; Hardcore Dave; Airock; King Kong aka Fisty the Clown; Bones; Citizen Greg

BunchoFuckinGoofs, or the BFGs, is a Canadian hardcore punk band from Toronto's Kensington Market neighbourhood, formed in November 1983. From July 1983 to July 1988, they ran a 24/7 boozecan at their Baldwin Street address known on the street as "Fort Goof". For another three and a half years they continued their antics at the 26A Oxford Street warehouse, "Goof World". They lived communally and, while they were known for smashing TVs on stage and opening bottles of beer with chainsaws, they described themselves as anti-drug crusaders, community activists and the neighbourhood guardians.

== History ==
The band was founded by Crazy Steve Goof, who was already playing with a loose group of musicians. Ruth Taylor asked him to put together a band to open for her band, United State, at Larry's Hideaway. Crazy Steve and his group wrote seven songs, then brought in a band called Quarantine to fill out a set. At the show, their performance was such that Crazy Steve said, "We better call ourselves a bunch of fucking goofs before everyone else does". The lineup for the first show was Steve on vocals, Scrag on bass, Maddog on drums, and Bambi on guitar.

Crazy Steve chose his musicians, not because they were good at music, but because they could play and drink. Alcohol was the central feature of the band's existence, and they were known for consuming vast amounts, with Steve stating that all they needed was "women, beer and weed". They also maintained an ethical position: Crazy Steve twice ran for Toronto city council, took in many of the city's homeless youth and campaigned against hard drugs.

In 1984, their "live like there is no tomorrow, end of the world by nuclear war" attitude and lifestyle was documented in Ruth Taylor and Edward Mowbray's documentary Not Dead Yet.

Their music was first recorded in 1985 when three of their songs appeared on the Jonestown Records compilation album Questionable, which also included music from the punk bands Living Proof, Animal Stags, and Madhouse. After hearing the album, Kieran Plunkett of The Restarts, spray-painted the Bunchofuckingoofs logo on the Berlin Wall. After the wall was taken down, that section was placed in art shows in Basel and New York.

In 1986, Bunchofuckingoofs released their first EP, Theres No Solution So Theres No Problem [sic]. At this point, the band's members were Crazy Steve (vocals), Godzilla on guitar, Scumbag Merrick on bass, and drummer Mad Dog. In 1987, they appeared as the Bar Band in the film City of Shadows.

Several EPs and albums followed. The band performed their first cross-Canada tour in 1991. Eventually, they lost the space for Fort Goof, which was a large part of their income, but the group continued, releasing the album Totally Unmarketable in 1997, undertaking a second cross-canada tour in 2001, and releasing their final album, Assaulting Average Asswipes in 2008.

On November 26, 2008, 25 years to the day after its first show, the group played its final gig, at Toronto's Kathedral. The lineup was Crazy Steve on vocals, al-Qaetor on bass, Adam (Fetus) and Mike Murderio on guitar, and Greg Goose on drums.

In 2011, Jennifer Morton released her book Dirty, Drunk, and Punk: The Twisted Crazy Story of the Bunchofuckingoofs. The band got back together to record one session and play one show. The lineup was Crazy Steve on vocals, Maddog on drums, Stompin' Al and Airock on guitar, King Kong and Scrag on bass. This was recorded at the University of Toronto's CIUT-FM on October 25, 2011.

== Discography ==
- Theres No Solution So Theres No Problem (1986, EP), Back Alley Records
- Drunk? Destroyed? Demolished! - The Demo (1989, EP), Independent
- Carnival Of Chaos + Carnage (1992), Fringe Product
- Totally Unmarketable (1997, EP), Back Alley Records
- Barrage of Battery and Brutality (Anthology, 2000), God Records
- Assaulting Average Asswipes (2008, EP), Back Alley Records

Compilation Inclusions

- Questionable: The Compilation (1985), Jonestown Records
- A Touch Of Fringe: The Compilation (1993), Fringe Product
- Dead On The Road: Songs Without Keyboards (1993), A&M Records, Raw Energy Records
- The International Punk Rock Box Set (2001), Meathead Records
- Canucks Punk Rock (2006), Burnout Productions
