= Kent McClard =

American music manager

- Born: Kent McClard; 1967 (age 58–59); Goleta, California, U.S.
- Education: University of California, Santa Barbara
- Occupations: Record label owner; music publisher; photographer; columnist; zine publisher
- Years active: 1990–present
- Organization: Ebullition Records

Kent McClard (born 1967) is an American record label owner, photographer, columnist, and zine publisher from Goleta, California.

== Early life ==
McClard has said that he grew up in a "broken home", and that he was a "troublesome" child. During his teenage years, he found solace in hardcore punk, which profoundly influenced him and played a defining role in his life. Inspired by its freedom and ethics, he embarked on various DIY ventures, including organizing what is believed to be the first local show and publishing the first fanzine in his town.

== Ebullition Records ==
In early 1990, McClard, a former Maximumrocknroll columnist, founded Ebullition Records with Sonia Skindrud, the writer of the zine Exedra, and Brent Stephens, a member of Downcast. Skindrud contributed the name for the label, while Stephens created the logo. However, it is primarily McClard who manages and operates the label.

Los Angeles hardcore band Inside Out was initially intended to record an LP as the first release for Ebullition. However, Revelation Records approached them and requested a 7" release instead, and the band opted for the more established label. The record ended up being delayed for another year, by which time the band had already disbanded. Inside Out had plans to release a second record titled "Rage Against the Machine," a phrase coined by McClard and featured in some of his writings, including issue #9 of the zine, No Answers.

== HeartattaCk ==
HeartattaCk was a punk zine, along the lines of Punk Planet and Maximumrocknroll with a strong bent towards hardcore punk and anti-consumerism. It was published by Kent McClard and Lisa Oglesby from March 1994 through June 2006. In the final years of its publication it remained one of the most popular zines available. O'Connor describes it as being "one of half a dozen major punk fanzines in the USA during the 1990s."
