= Pop screamo =

Genre of music

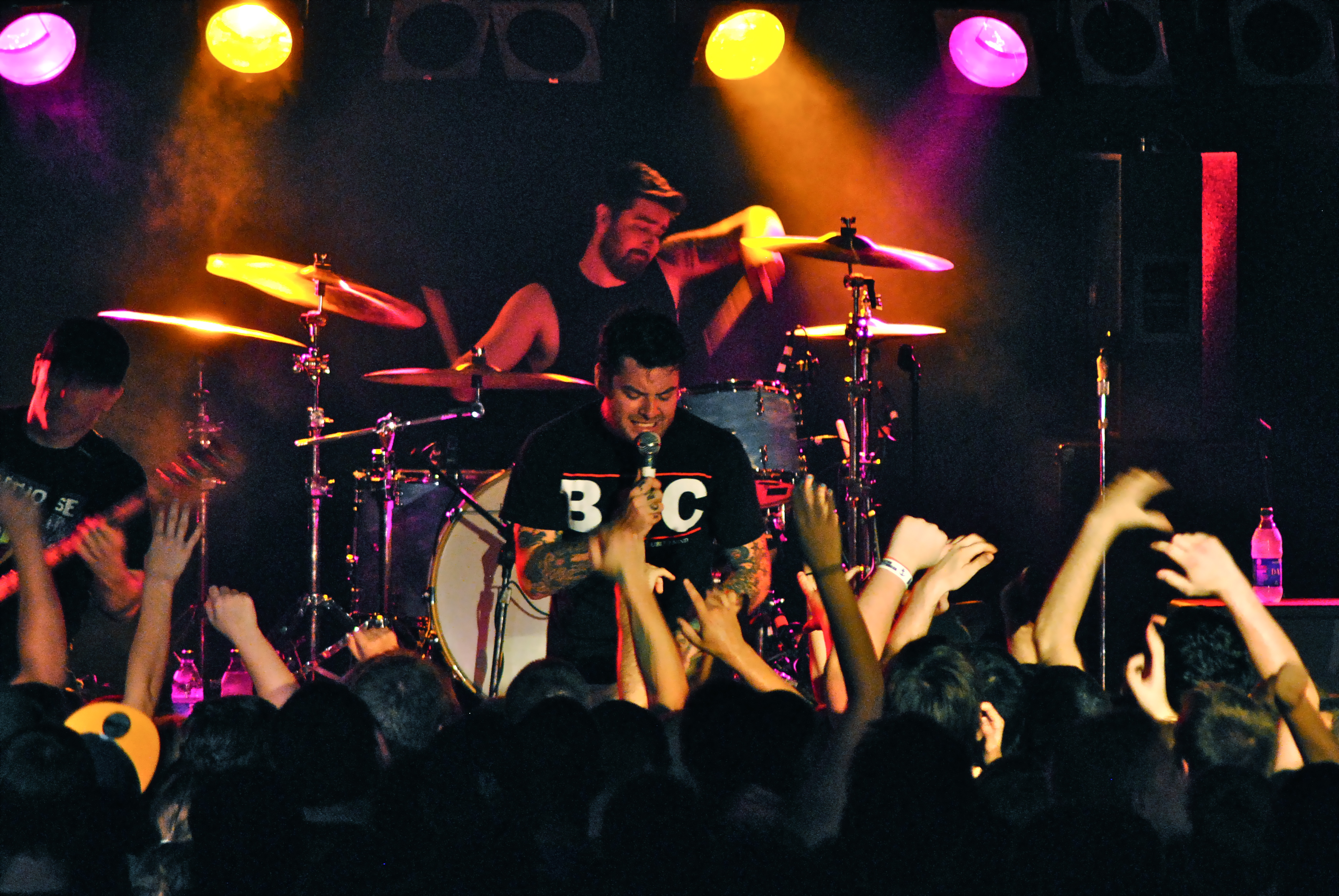
- Senses Fail were a prominent pop screamo band, emerging from the influential New Brunswick basement scene
- Other names: MTV screamo, mall screamo, screamo-lite
- Stylistic origins: Screamo; emo pop; metalcore
- Cultural origins: Late 1990s to early 2000s, North America (Ontario, Coral Springs, New Brunswick, Greater Los Angeles)
- Derivative forms: Risecore

Regional scenes
- New Jersey, Southern Ontario, South Wales

Local scenes
- New Brunswick

Other topics
- Emo subculture, scene, dreamcore, swancore, sass, crunkcore, emo

Pop screamo (or mall screamo) is a subgenre of post-hardcore that combines elements of screamo, emo pop and metalcore. It is characterized by the incorporation of both screamo-indebted screaming in verses and emo pop-indebted clean singing in choruses, as well as chaotic, metalcore-influenced instrumental elements, particularly breakdowns.

The genre has its origins in late 1990s bands such as such as Grade, Keepsake, Poison the Well and Drowningman, who were merging screamo and metalcore, while also incorporating the clean singing of emo and pop-punk. Its first codified wave began with Thursday's Full Collapse (2001). This wave entered the mainstream in the United States with My Chemical Romance, the Used and Thrice, Canada with Alexisonfire and Silverstein, and the United Kingdom with Funeral for a Friend. The genre reached its commercial peak in 2004, soon declining in mainstream prominence as emo pop became increasingly dominant. During this time, some pop screamo releases continued to gain commercial success, particularly Hawthorne Heights's "Ohio Is for Lovers" (2005) and the Red Jumpsuit Apparatus's "Face Down" (2006). During this time, many bands began to expand upon the genre's sonic landscape, with Escape the Fate merging it with elements of 1980s hard rock, Fightstar with post-rock and classical music, the Fall of Troy with math rock and I Set My Friends on Fire with electronic music.

During the late 2000s, pop screamo became progressively intertwined with metalcore, when Alesana, Drop Dead, Gorgeous and From First to Last increasingly incorporated metal elements, pioneering the Risecore genre, soon popularized by Attack Attack!, the Devil Wears Prada and Of Mice & Men. At the same time, Brokencyde and Breathe Carolina pioneered the hip hop fusion genre crunkcore using elements of pop screamo. During the 2010s, later first-wave pop screamo bands Pierce the Veil and Sleeping with Sirens continued to gain commercial success, while newer bands Before Their Eyes, the Ongoing Concept, Too Close to Touch and I Am Terrified were partaking in a minor revival.

Beginning in the late 2010s, the United Kingdom experienced a revival of the genre when Static Dress and Modern Error fused it with elements of dreamcore and grungegaze. During the early 2020s, an interconnected revival also began in the United States with SeeYouSpaceCowboy and If I Die First. By the mid-2020s a separate wave of United States pop screamo was being fronted by I Promised the World and Car Underwater.

During its peak popularity, pop screamo was often called simply screamo. Pop screamo was coined in the mid-2000s, in order to differentiate the genre from the traditional screamo style that inspired it, which similarly developed the name skramz.

== Characteristics ==
Pop screamo builds upon the template of traditional screamo, but differentiates itself by incorporating melodic, sung vocals and metal influenced riffs. It additionally embraces elements of emo pop, and the dissonant metalcore style of Deadguy, Botch, Converge and Coalesce. Some bands in the genre also incorporated elements from other 2000s post-hardcore styles. Pop screamo bands often feature cleaner production than its parent genres. Oftentimes, verses feature unclean vocals, while choruses use clean singing. Breakdowns are also frequently used, oftentimes during a song's bridge. Clean vocals were often sung with a nasally tone.

Alternative Press Magazine described it as a subgenre of post-hardcore, while Ultimate Guitar editor Jorge Martins called it a subgenre of the post-hardcore subgenre screamo.

== Etymology ==
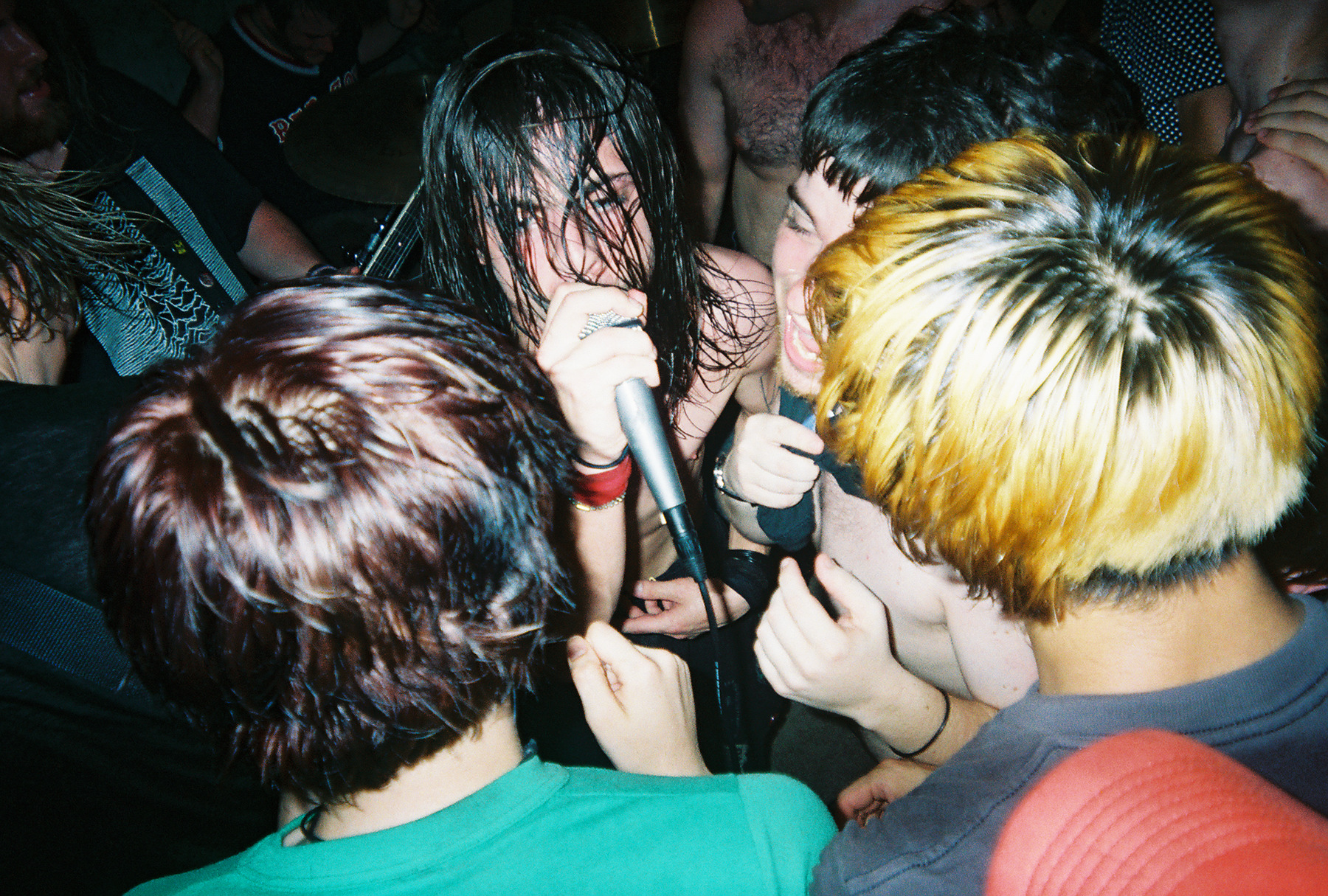
Pg. 99, a traditional screamo band, whom the name "pop screamo" was coined in order to differentiate the genre from

The term screamo is a portmanteau of the words "scream" and "emo". The term began to be used by the mid-1990s, solely amongst the DIY hardcore scene to describe the original screamo genre. Following the late 1990s popularity of screamo-adjacent band the Locust, screamo began to attract the attention of people outside of hardcore, and its name was being used more broadly. During the early 2000s, the term became equally as tied to the original screamo sound, as to the more melodic, but screamo-influenced, pop screamo. In 2003, Derek Miller, guitarist for Poison the Well, noted the term's constant differing usages and jokingly stated that it "describes a thousand different genres." In 2008, Bert McCracken, lead singer of the Used, stated that screamo is merely a term "for record companies to sell records and for record stores to categorize them."

By the mid-2000s, the popularity of pop screamo had led to the word "screamo" being used loosely to describe any use of screamed vocals in music. To combat the increasingly broad-nature of "screamo", the retronym "skramz" began to be used to describe the original DIY definition of screamo. This recodification also saw the rise of the term "pop screamo", for the more mainstream derivative, a name attested to by publications including Punk Planet in 2004, PunkNews in 2005 and News Release Today in 2007. Previously, Stuart Green of Exclaim had used the term "screamo pop" to refer to Grade, Thursday and Glasseater in 2003. It also developed the synonyms "MTV screamo", "mall screamo" and "screamo-lite". The German blog Heavy Pop noted "mall screamo" as a derogatory label.

== History ==
=== Origins (1997–2000) ===
There really was no one doing the seamless integration of the screaming and singing that Grade did on Separate the Magnets and totally perfected on Under the Radar... they either get no credit because their progeny is hideous, or they’re dismissed because serious music journalists don’t pontificate about bands Alternative Press magazine covered.

— Sam Sutherland, journalist for Exclaim!, as quoted by Michael Barclay (April 26, 2022)

Southern Ontario band Grade had begun their career playing a style indebted to metalcore band Chokehold. However, by the time of their debut album And Such Is Progress (1995), they had departed into a style more informed by emo bands Indian Summer, Rye Coalition and Lincoln. With this change, vocalist Kyle Bishop began contrasting his screams with sung vocals inspired by James Brown, Black Francis and Bob Mould. On Grade's second and third albums, Separate the Magnets (1997) and Under the Radar (1999), they pushed their sound further away from traditional screamo, pioneering the sound of pop screamo. These releases were widely influential. Journalist Sam Southerland credited them as the first albums to "seamlessly" merge screaming and singing.

When asked by Noisey in 2014 if he ever felt bitter for a lack of recognition, singer Kyle Bishop stated,

"There's a lot of accolades that people give us for supposedly starting something and I think that's all bullshit, to be honest with you. I think that a billion bands were doing similar things before us and after that deserve just as much credit. And if we do get some credit from certain people, awesome. If we don't, it doesn't really matter because I really don't think it's true anyway."

Coral Springs, Florida band Keepsake began to merge pop-punk and screamo on their 1998 debut album The Things I Would Say. Law of Inertia magazine noted that "their whole schtick is being a pop-punk band because that's in and simultaneously being a 'screamo-o' band because that's also in. The two genres don't mix, were never intended to mix". Going on to note their similarity to later pop screamo acts. The Keepsake side project Poison the Well were one of the earliest bands to merge post-hardcore, emo and metalcore, shaping the sound that would later become pop screamo. This was particularly prominent on their first three albums The Opposite of December... A Season of Separation (1999), Tear from the Red (2002) and You Come Before You (2003). Lambgoat.com said of their legacy, Poison the Well "walked so (insert mall screamo band here) could run." In a 2003 interview with the radio station KNAC, the band's guitarist Derek Miller was asked about their "Hardcore meets Emo sound" sound. He responded "As far as I’m concerned, the whole thing to start this 'Emo-Metal' was Cave In with Beyond Hypothermia", going on to clarify that on The Opposite of December, they were simply copying Cave In and "not thinking about being original".

Exclaim! writer Sam Sutherland noted Drowningman as having "essentially pioneered" the genre. The band were influential upon many subsequent bands in the genre. They disbanded in 2002, just before their proginey's mainstream prevalence. A 2016 Exclaim! article credited them, as well as Boysetsfire, Waterdown and Thursday as amongst the earliest bands to adopt Grade's style. Maximum Rocknroll called Codeseven's 1999 album Division of Labor "proto-mall screamo" due to its fusion of metalcore and post-hardcore, similarly Alternative Press magazine cited Beloved, formed in 1999, as "forefathers of the pop-screamo era".

=== Mainstream breakthrough (2001–2004) ===
==== New Brunswick ====
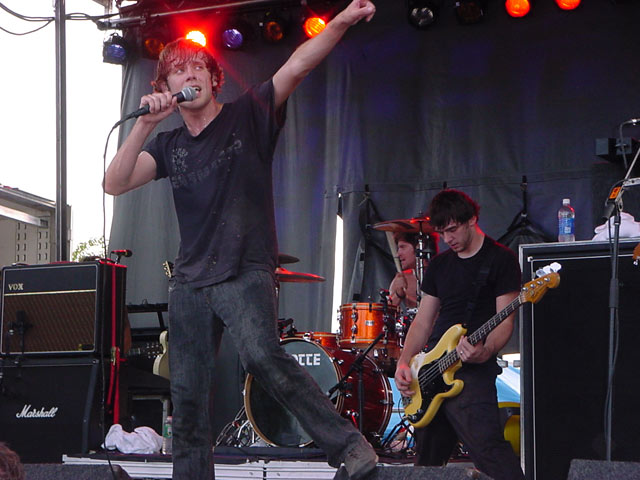
Thursday helped to establish pop screamo's mainstream prominence in the 2000s

One of the earliest pioneers of pop screamo was Thursday, whose second album Full Collapse (2001), particularly its single "Understanding in a Car Crash", was highly influential within the genre. The first screamo–influenced album to gain significant media attention, it reached number 178 on the Billboard 200 and led to the band signing a multimillion-dollar, multi-album contract with Island Def Jam. Their subsequent album, War All the Time (2003), reached number seven on the Billboard 200.

Under the influence of Thursday, many other bands in New Jersey began to fuse the same styles, such as Senses Fail and My Chemical Romance. The New Brunswick basement scene became what ultimately brought emo to mainstream attention, with Em Casalena of American Songwriter stating that "Any conversation about bands that defined the emo sound will likely at least mention My Chemical Romance." The band's debut album I Brought You My Bullets, You Brought Me Your Love (2002) was influential on the sound on subsequent releases in emo, due to its use of the nascent style. Revolver named them as a key band in the "short yet crucial time-span" of mall screamo. On its follow up Three Cheers for Sweet Revenge (2004), they moved away from the style. Senses Fail's debut EP From the Depths of Dreams was released the same year. Loudwire wrote of Senses Fail's debut album Let It Enfold You (2004): "As a full-length debut, this album is impressive enough; its impact can still be seen rippling across the scene", Alternative Press note that it "will always be a staple of the pop-screamo genre". The album peaked at number 34 on the Billboard 200, selling 25,000 copies during its first week of release. It also charted at number two on the Independent Albums chart. It was certified gold by the Recording Industry Association of America in the US in 2020.

==== Greater Los Angeles ====
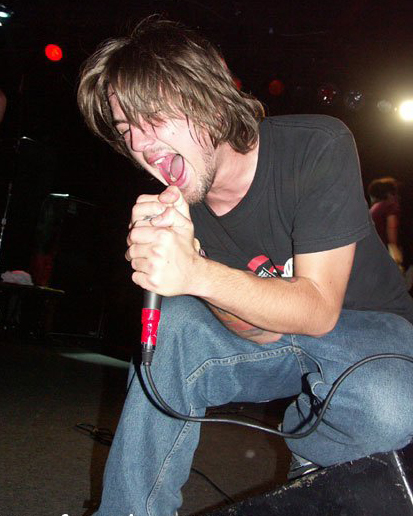
Finch's What It Is to Burn was one of the most influential pop screamo albums of the 2000s

In Irvine, California, Thrice's second album The Illusion of Safety (2002) helped pioneer pop screamo and establish its mainstream prominence. Following its release "thousands of bands" began to make music inspired by it. The band released only one more album in the genre, The Artist in the Ambulance (2003), soon pursuing a separate sound. The Illusion of Safety sold 4,202 copies in its first week of release. It peaked at number 14 on the Billboard Independent Albums chart, and number 20 on Heatseekers Albums chart. By July 2006, it had sold 167,000 copies in the US. In 2019, the band's guitarist Teppei Teranishi said the album was "undoubtedly the highest point of [Thrice's] career as far as profile and popularity are concerned." For this album, both Thursday and Thrice were signed to Island Records, who advertised their shared pop screamo style as a phenonom similar to grunge.

Finch's debut album What It Is to Burn (2002) influenced much of the subsequent acts in the genre. What It Is to Burn charted at number 99 on the US Billboard 200 chart. By April 2003, the album had sold over 200,000 copies in the US. It charted at number 177 on the UK Albums Chart, while "Letters to You" reached number 39 on the UK Singles Chart. "What It Is to Burn" peaked at number 15 on the US Alternative Songs chart and number 35 on the Mainstream Rock chart. By October 2007, What It Is to Burn had sold over 400,000 copies worldwide.

In the Los Angeles metalcore scene, Eighteen Visions had defined a flamboyant and effeminate style of dress they called "fashioncore". With the rise of pop screamo, some fashioncore bands began to incorporate elements of the genre into their metalcore style, particularly Atreyu, began to do this on their debut album Suicide Notes and Butterfly Kisses (2002). In following year, fashioncore band A Static Lullaby toured with Long Island's From Autumn to Ashes and, New Jersey's Senses Fail. Through this Senses Fail to adopted the fashioncore look, spreading it to other New Jersey bands, which would help to define subsequent iterations of the emo subculture. By 2008, A Static Lullaby had pivoted from the genre, concerned their music "could end up a pop-screamo-type jam".

==== Ontario ====
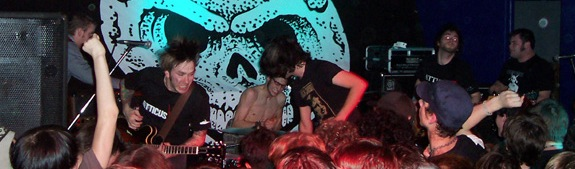
Alexisonfire used a multiple lead vocalist dynamic, which later became a common trait of the genre

Grade's influence built a prominent pop screamo in the Canadian province of Ontario, largely based around the annual S.C.E.N.E. Music Festival. It notably produced Alexisonfire, Silverstein and the Reason. Alexisonfire were one of the most influential pop screamo bands internationally Metal Hammer writer Matt Mills called their 2002 self-titled debut album "key in legitimising the screamo sound", while Ultimate Guitar editor Jorge Martins credited multiple of their early songs with "defining the mainstream screamo scene." Andrew Sacher of BrooklynVegan wrote that the album defined typical emo characteristics such as "Two singers, one who screams and one who whine-sings... Chaotic song structures... Bright melodies even at the most aggressive moments... Verbose teenage poetry, sometimes delivered as tense spoken word... [and an] overwhelming amount of melodrama..." Sacher said that the album "helped establish [the foregoing traits] as dominant traits of the early 2000s emo/post-hardcore boom." The album received a platinum certification by Music Canada as it sold over 100,000 units in Canada. Around 2002, many Canadian pop-punk bands began to shift their style towards pop screamo. The album's followup Watch Out! (2004) "perfected their style [of screamo], to put it positively, or the edges that could still be heard on the debut were rounded off to put it less positively." The album debuted at number 6 on the Canadian Albums Chart, selling 6,580 copies in its first week of release. By April 2005, it had sold 50,000 copies in Canada, and 27,500 copies in the US.

==== Wales ====
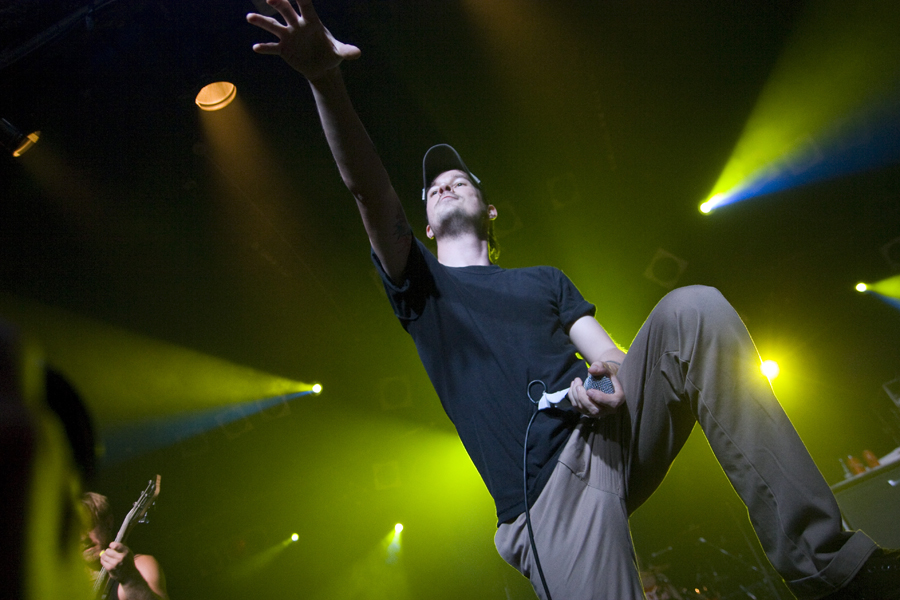
Following the commercial success of Welsh pop screamo band Funeral for a Friend, some publications claimed "South Wales is the new Seattle"

In the early 2000s, South Wales was home to a large post-hardcore scene based around venues such as the Toll House in Bridgend, the Maltsters in Pontypridd, TJ's in Newport and the Barfly in Cardiff. A central element of this scene was the record label Mighty Atom Records, who also owned a record studio. The commercial success of Welsh post-hardcore band Lostprophets led to major record labels attempting to sign many of the band from the Welsh hardcore scene. The first of these was Funeral for a Friend, who formed in 2001 following the departure of vocalist Michael Davies from Bridgend metalcore band January Thirst. At Bridgend record store The Jungle, the members of January Thirst met worker Matthew Davies-Kreye, who soon joined the band as vocalist, renaming themselves Funeral for a Friend. Davies-Kreye's influence from emo brought the band more melodic sensibilities. The 2003 debut album Casually Dressed & Deep in Conversation by Welsh band Funeral for a Friend was a defining part of the genre, peaking at number 12 on the UK albums charts. Its follow up Hours (2005) peaked at the same spot in the UK, and was their first album to appear on the US Billboard 200, reaching number 139.

The sound expanded in the area, with the subsequent success of the Blackout, Adzuki, Covergirl, Shape of My Addiction and Robots Talk In Twos. In the wake of this success, a number of popular publications also began running stories stating that "Newport is the new Seattle" or "South Wales is the new Seattle". The sound of these bands was generally shaped by albums from American groups such as Full Collapse (2001) by Thursday, Tear from the Red (2002) by Poison the Well and Worship and Tribute (2002) by Glassjaw. In a 2015 article by Vice, Funeral for a Friend vocalist Matthew Davies-Kreye stated that "We took [the sound of the aforementioned American artists] and spun it on it’s [sic] head, gave it a bit more of a geographical sensibility. You write what you know, so the lyrical content distilled all the elements of the world around us", going on to cite the Manic Street Preachers, especially their third album the Holy Bible (1994), as "very influential on absolutely everyone".

==== Elsewhere ====
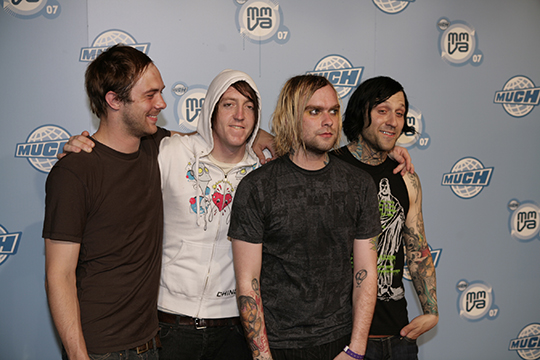
The Used were the most commercially successful band playing pop screamo during the early 2000s

During the early 2000s, the most commercially successful band playing pop screamo was the Used, whose self-titled debut (2002) was certified gold by the RIAA on July 21, 2003. self-titled album, as of August 22, 2009, had sold 841,000 copies. Their album In Love and Death (2004) was certified gold by the RIAA on March 21, 2005. In Love and Death, as of January 2, 2007, sold 689,000 copies in the United States, according to Nielsen SoundScan.

Saosin's Translating the Name EP (2003) was one of the definitive releases of the period, being widely influential in the subsequent years. The release put a greater emphasis on the influence metal. Around this time, some metalcore bands, including As I Lay Dying and Underoath, began to incorporate the influence of pop screamo into their sounds. On They're Only Chasing Safety (2004), Underoath transitioned into pop screamo, but retained many of their heavier, metal influences. The album peaked at number 101 on the Billboard 200 and number seven on the Christian Albums charts. The album and its followup Define the Great Line (2006) permeated the mainstream, both being certified gold by the RIAA. In 2024, Andrew Sacher of BrooklynVegan named the album as one of the best emo albums of 2004, saying: "A lot of bands mixed metalcore and pop-emo in the early/mid 2000s, but few did it better than Underoath did on They’re Only Chasing Safety. [...] if you weren’t looking closely, they might’ve seemed interchangeable with the countless other similar bands of that era. But Underoath had a lot more depth to them than a lot of the bands they were often grouped with" Define the Great Line debuted at number two on the Billboard 200 charts, selling over 98,000 copies in its first week. It became the highest-charting Christian release since You Light Up My Life: Inspirational Songs by LeAnn Rimes reached the top spot in 1997. Following this album, the band returned to persueing a heavier direction.

This time also saw the releases of influential albums by Story of the Year, AFI, and He Is Legend. The genre reached its commercial peak around 2004.

=== Commercial decline and underground developments (2005–2009) ===
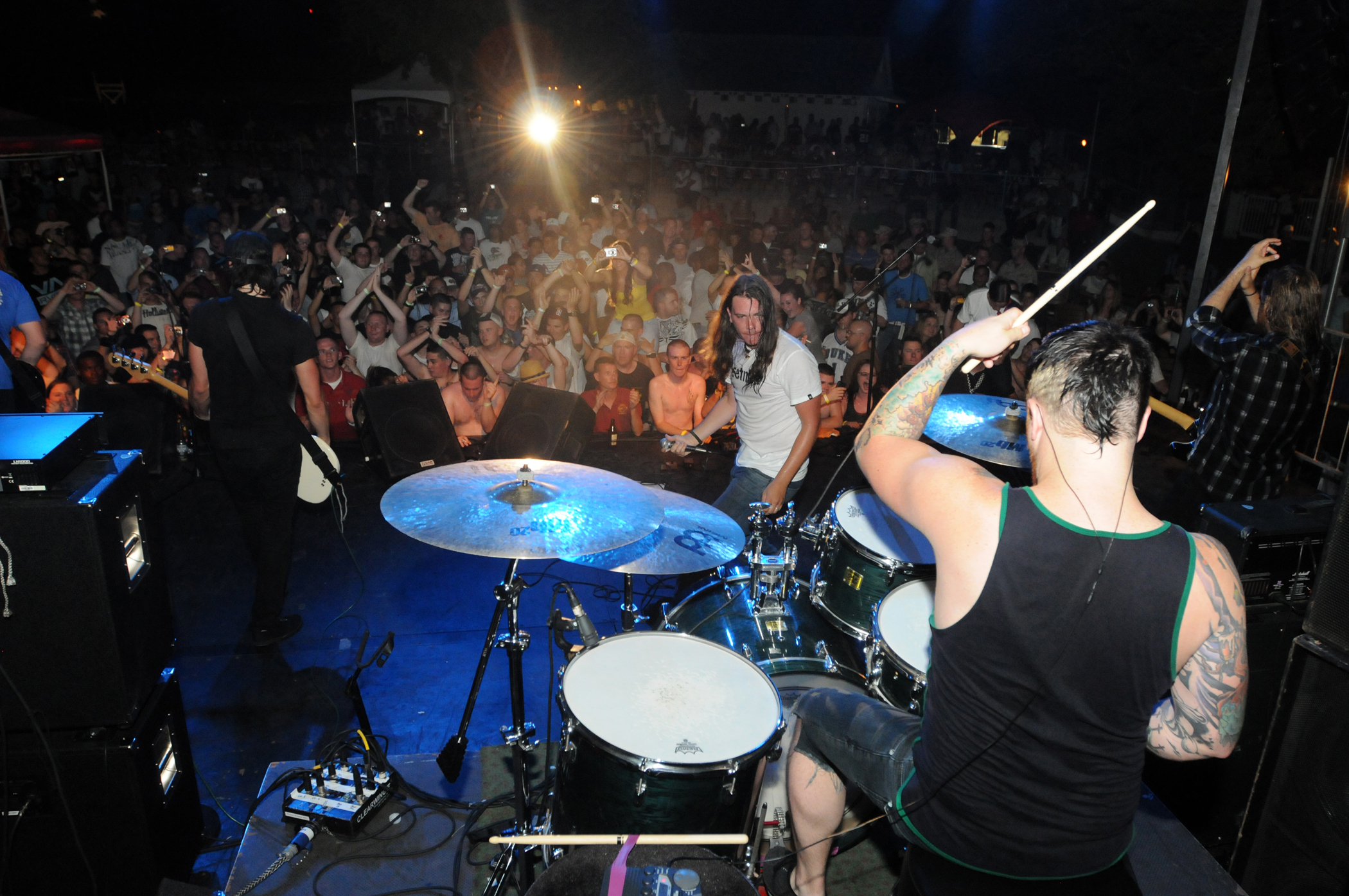
The Red Jumpsuit Apparatus's single "Face Down" (2006) was one of the highest charting pop screamo songs following the genre's commercial decline

Around 2005, pop screamo began to decline in popularity, as the dominant style of emo shifted towards Fall Out Boy, Paramore, Panic! at the Disco and My Chemical Romance's later, softer style. Many bands were also displaced by heavier styles, often metalcore. However, some pop screamo releases continued to experience mainstream prominence. Hawthorne Heights's 2005 single "Ohio Is for Lovers" was an emblematic song of the genre, jokingly referred to as "The Emo Anthem" due to the self-harm topics in its lyrical content. The Red Jumpsuit Apparatus too were mainstay of the scene, with some crossover success. Their song "Face Down" (2006) peaked at number ten on the Billboard Mainstream Top 40 chart. Cleveland.com called Chiodos, who began to release music at this time, "one of the defining bands of the pop-screamo subgenre".

From the Welsh pop screamo scene emerged Bullet for My Valentine, who merged elements of it into their melodic metalcore sound. Their debut album The Poison was released in 2005, Corey Apar of AllMusic compared its sound to Atreyu, Funeral for a Friend and Alexisonfire, stating that the band utilize "the glossy, melodic metal-meets-emo aesthetic, utilizing darkly romanticized lyrics that are smoothly sung and growled side-by-side". On their second album Doppelgänger (2005), the Fall of Troy incorporated technical math rock riffs and progressive rock song structures into pop screamo, creating what BrooklynVegan writer Andrew Sacher called "pop-screamo's answer to Van Halen". London's Fightstar were described Yorkshire Evening Post as "a British rival" to the likes of Thursday, but expanding upon the sound by embracing elements of post-rock and the song structures of classical music. Their debut EP, They Liked You Better When You Were Dead (2005), was a concept album inspired by Fight Club, and their debut album, Grand Unification (2006), was based upon the Neon Genesis Evangelion franchise. Kerrang! editor Paul Brannigan called Grand Unification "one of the best British rock albums of the last decade". They then received a nomination for Best British Band at the 2006 Kerrang! Awards

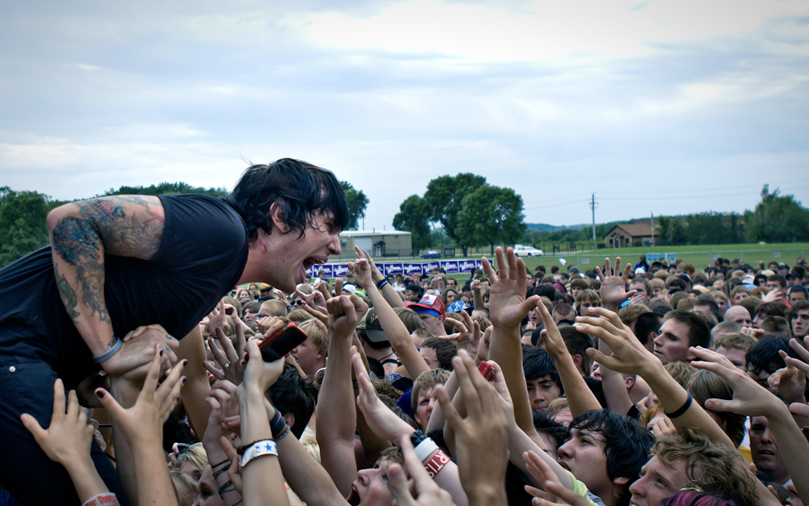
In the late 2000s, pop screamo and metalcore became increasingly intertwined, leading to bands such as Alesana pioneering Risecore, seen performing at Warped Tour 2010 in Shakopee, MN

On their second album, This War Is Ours (2008), Escape the Fate began merging pop screamo with 1980s-style hard rock. Alongside Blessed by a Broken Heart, the album and the band's visual style helped to pioneer a fusion between the scene subculture and glam metal, which would go on to be continued by Black Veil Brides and Falling in Reverse.

In the mid-2000s, many pop screamo bands began to push their music further into the prevailing metalcore sound, particularly Alesana, Drop Dead, Gorgeous, Blessthefall and From First to Last. In turn, Drop Dead, Gorgeous, Alesana, Blessthefall, A Skylit Drive and Escape the Fate became early pioneers of metalcore's Risecore and scenecore subgenres. By the end of the decade, this style had been popularised by Attack Attack!, the Devil Wears Prada, I See Stars, We Came As Romans and Of Mice & Men.

I Set My Friends on Fire merged pop screamo with electronic elements, in a style that led to BrooklynVegan editor Andrew Sacher retrospectively calling them "pop-screamo maniacs" and "hyperpop godfathers". At the same time, Brokencyde and Breathe Carolina began to merge pop screamo vocals and hip hop instrumentals, helping to pioneer the crunkcore genre.

=== Revived commercial success (2010s) ===
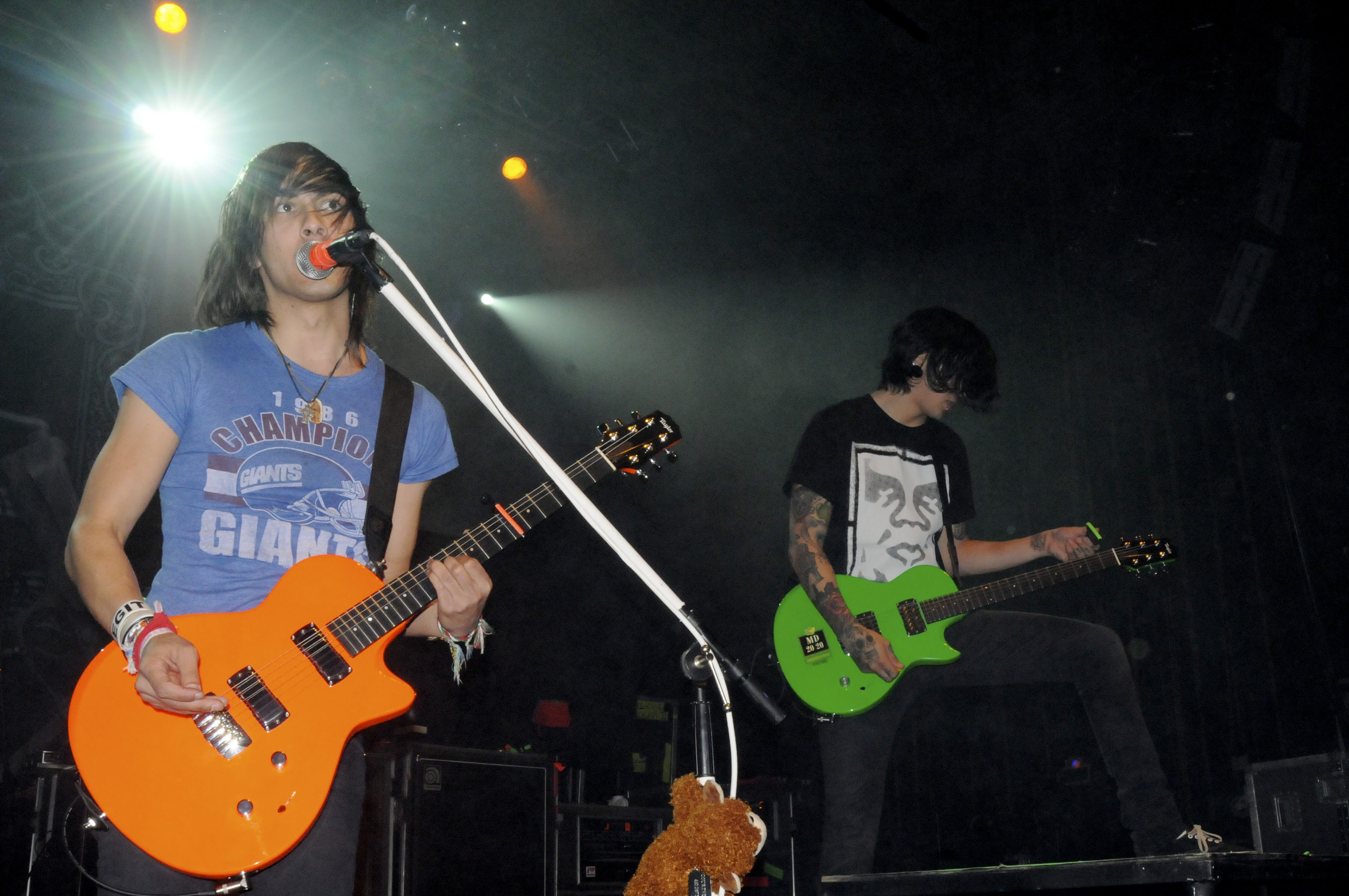
Pierce the Veil were one of the most commercially prominent pop screamo bands of the 2010s

During the 2010s, the two most prominent pop screamo bands were Pierce the Veil and Sleeping with Sirens, who were pushing the genre further into its pop music influence. Pierce the Veil's second album Selfish Machines (2010) went to number one on the Billboard Heatseekers Chart. On 5 June 2012, Pierce the Veil collaborated with Sleeping with Sirens vocalist Kellin Quinn for the single "King for a Day". The collaboration derived from fans' shared association between the bands, despite neither band having performed together or met. The single charted on the U.S. Billboard Digital Rock Songs where it peaked at number 29, and on the Hot Rock Songs chart with a peak of number 37. The song also peaked at number 28 in the UK Rock & Metal Singles Charts. In November 2014, the song was certified Gold by the RIAA for having sold more than 500,000 units in the U.S. On June 28, 2024, it was announced the single went 2× Platinum, selling more than two million units digitally. The song was the lead single for Pierce the Veil's third album Collide with the Sky (2012) which entered the U.S. Billboard 200 at number 12, selling over 27,000 copies in its debut week. The album has sold over 120,000 copies as of May 2013. As of March 2016, the album has sold nearly 350,000 copies.

Sleeping with Sirens' debut album With Ears to See and Eyes to Hear (2011) peaked at seven on the U.S. Heatseekers charts Their second album Let's Cheers to This (2011) peaked at number five on the Top Hard Rock Albums, and its most commercially successful single "If You Can't Hang" (2011), was later certified platinum by the RIAA. On their third album Feel (2013), they shifted to a lighter sound.

The genre had a revival in the mid-2010s, including such outfits as Before Their Eyes, the Ongoing Concept, Too Close to Touch and I Am Terrified. MetalSucks writer Finn McKenty acredited this to the genre losing its stigma amongst young people of the decade, as well as successful campaigns by Hawthorne Heights, Haste the Day and Falling in Reverse. In January 2017, From First to Last's classic vocalist Sonny Moore rejoined the band, releasing the single "Make War".

=== Underground revival (2020s) ===
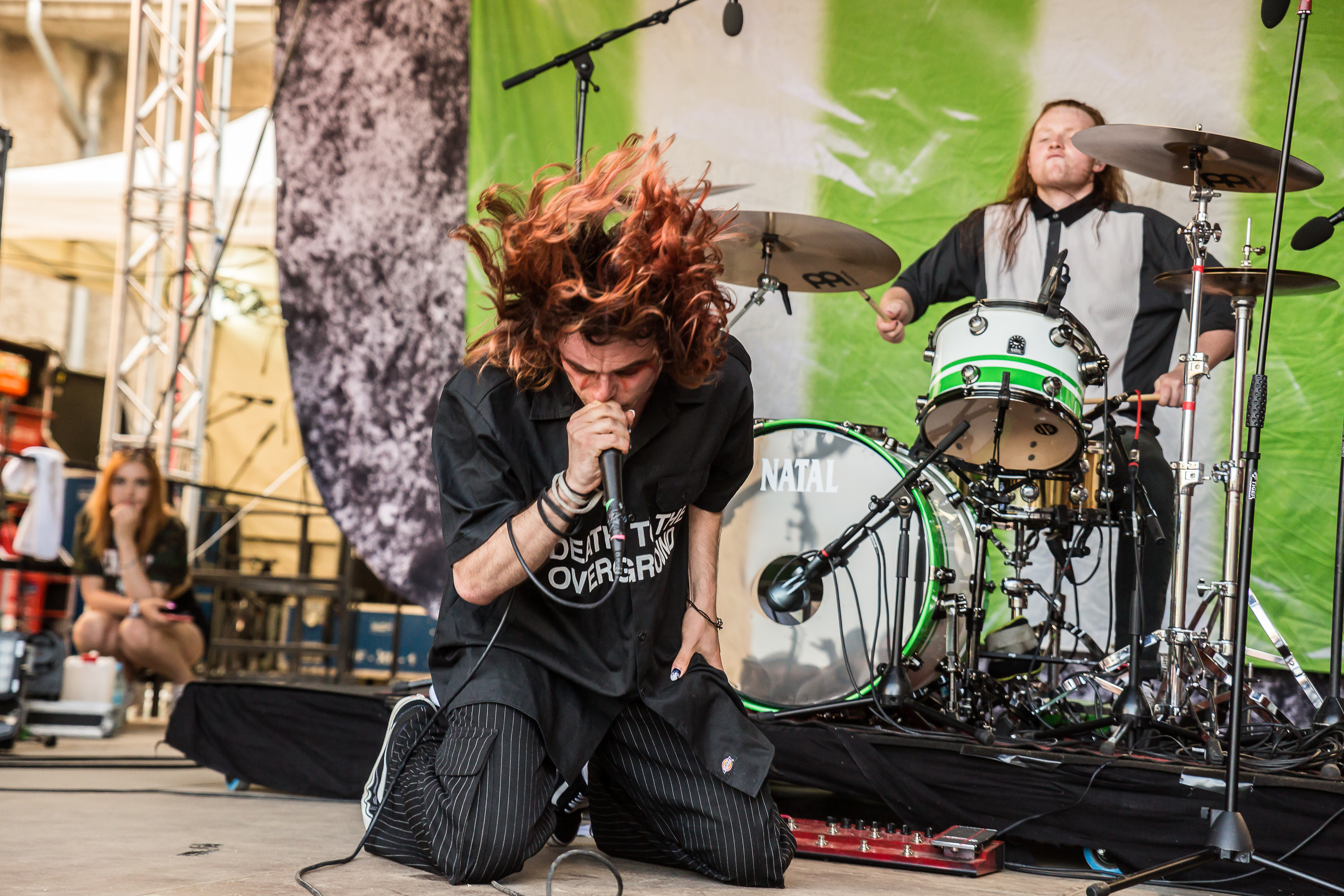
Static Dress headed a pop screamo revival in the 2020s

Around 2019, some British bands rooted in dreamcore pivoted their sounds towards pop screamo. The forefront acts were Static Dress and Modern Error. This wave coincided with an explosion in grungegaze, leading its practitioners to occasionally incorporate the genre's guitar textures and playing techniques. Some songs in this wave, including ones by Heaven Unknown and Static Dress, also incorporated elements of hyperpop such as bitcrushers, glitches and vocoders. Static Dress' second album Injury Episode (2026) peaked at number 6 on the Official Rock & Metal Albums Chart in the United Kingdom.

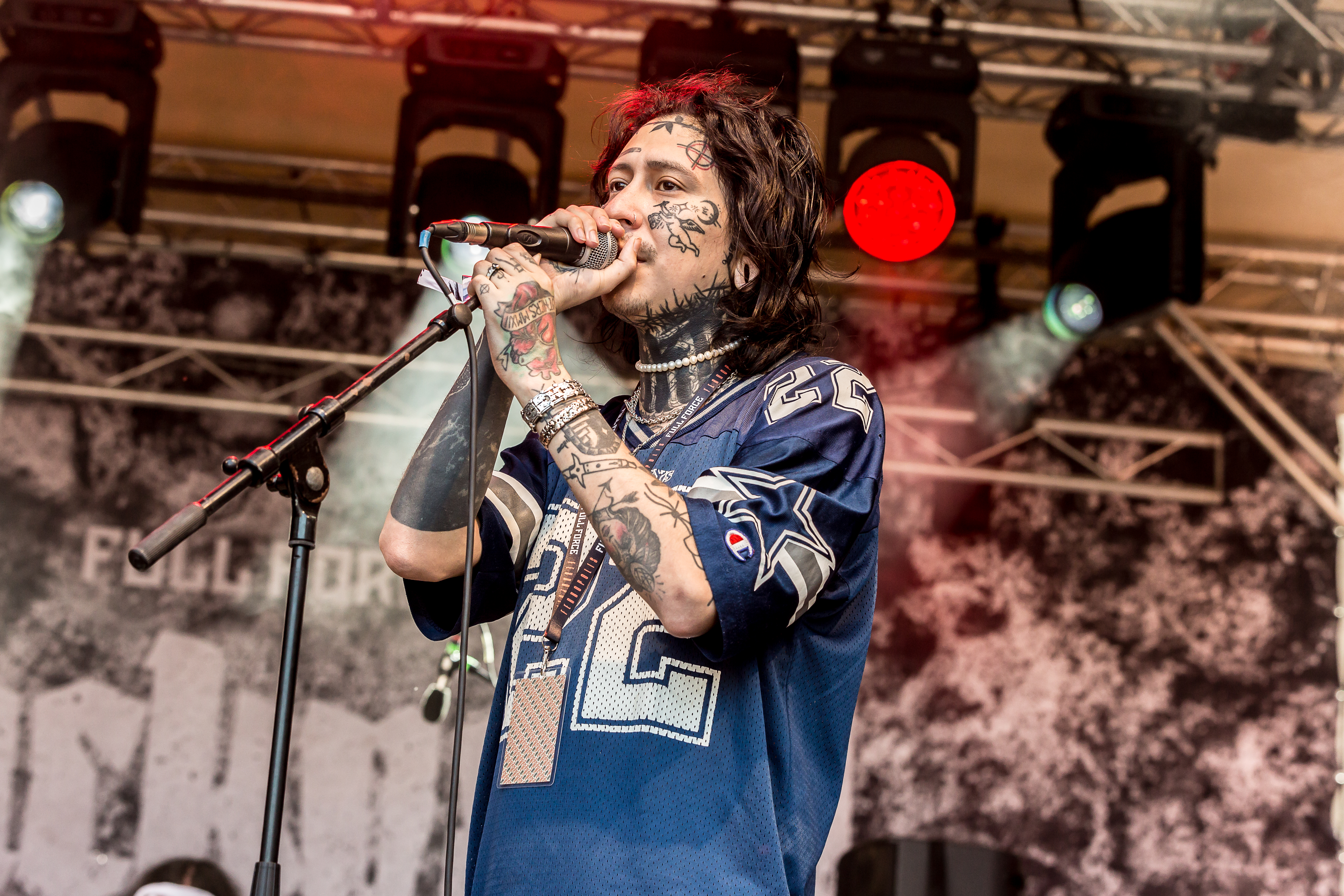
Lil Lotus, vocalist for If I Die First, a forefront pop screamo band in the early 2020s. In 2026, he joined classic pop screamo band From First to Last.

In the early 2020s, American bands SeeYouSpaceCowboy, Bury Your Idols, If I Die First and Wristmeetrazor took part in a pop screamo revival. Loudwire credited SeeYouSpaceCowboy's third album Coup de Grâce (2024) with having "managed to merge both true screamo à la Orchid and Honeywell with the mainstream interpretation à la Alesana and Drop Dead, Gorgeous", and "refin[ing] pop screamo choruses into something simultaneously nostalgic and modern". However, this wave did not last long, with many of its forefront acts disbanding just a few years later. During this time, Pierce the Veil and Sleeping Sirens' collaborative single "King for a Day" re-entered the Billboard charts, reaching number one on the U.S. Billboard Hard Rock Streaming Songs chart, number seven on the Rock Streaming Songs chart, number six on Alternative Streaming Songs chart, and number 21 on Alternative Digital Song Sales chart on August 17, 2022. This was derived from a surge in usage of the song on TikTok.

Screamo experienced a major resurgence in the 2020s, largely practiced by generation Z. During this period, it encompassed a wide variety of styles. In this wave, bands such as Kniveschou and Versera incorporated the palm muted riffs of metalcore. Concurrently, there was a wave of bands merging emo and metalcore, including Concealer and Of Eden. Around 2024, these two occurrences resulted in a pop screamo revival from within the screamo scene. This began to coalesce in Texas around 2024, where I Promised the World, Atcitdio and Rosasharin were forefront bands. In a 2026 interview, I Promised the World guitarist/clean vocalist Caleb Molina stated:

A few years ago my local scene and around was really screamo [and] twinkly emo or like Midwest emo. That was the big thing. Midwest emo and screamo... Obviously I love screamo but some of it I don't love. I don't really get. But I like singing so it just feels like this is what happened back in the day, when they were being screamo bands and then they're like "what if we made this melodic and poppy".

During the mid-2020s, some established fifth-wave emo bands shifted their sound towards pop screamo, this included Ben Quad on Ephemera (2024) and Asian Glow on IIIVIII (2026). At the same time, forefront hyperpop, digicore and zoomergaze musicians such as Photographic Memory, Darcy Baylis and Quannnic began the pop screamo supergroup Car Underwater with former If I Die First bassist Nolan Nunes.

== Response ==
The emo revival was as a reaction against the perceived commerciality of the third-wave emo movement that pop screamo was a part of. Beginning in the late 2000s, emo revival bands instead taking influence from the sound of second wave Midwest emo. The movement began with Pennsylvania-based groups Tigers Jaw, Glocca Morra, Snowing and Algernon Cadwallader.

The wave, whose core bands were Touché Amoré, La Dispute, Defeater, Pianos Become the Teeth and Make Do and Mend, was a rejection of the developments of pop screamo, emo pop and Risecore in the 2000s. Touché Amoré vocalist Jeremy Bolm described pop screamo as "years of awful, awful, awful insincere garbage that has taken over everything for so long now and I'd like to hope that it's starting to get weeded out…you know, like, the terrible swoop hair, rock star attitude, bullshit breakdown bands that have nothing to really offer anybody".
