= Triumph & Tragedy =

Triumph and Tragedy

EP by Grade
- Released: August 3, 1999
- Genre: Emo, Hardcore punk, Screamo
- Label: Victory

Grade chronology
Separate The Magnets	Triumph and Tragedy (1999)	Under the Radar (1999)

Triumph & Tragedy is Grade's first release on Victory Records. "Panama" is a cover of a Van Halen song. This EP was included in its entirety on The Embarrassing Beginning.

== Track listing ==
1. "Triumph & Tragedy"
2. "Stolen Bikes Ride Faster"
3. "Panama"
