= Only Forever =

Only Forever may refer to:

== Albums ==
- Only Forever (Alive Like Me album)
- Only Forever (Bing Crosby album)
- Only Forever (Puressence album)

== Songs ==
- "Only Forever" (song) (Bing Crosby song)
- "Only Forever", a song on Demi Lovato's album Tell Me You Love Me
