= Risecore =

Fusion music genre of metalcore and post-hardcore

- Other names: Sweetcore
- Stylistic origins: Metalcore; pop screamo; pop
- Cultural origins: Mid-2000s, United States
- Typical instruments: Vocals; guitar; bass; drums; synthesizer; sampler; programming

Other topics
- Breakdown; emo pop; post-hardcore; screamo; electronicore; sass; Audio samples

Audio sample
- "Start Again" by Alive Like Me, from Only Forever (Rise). This demonstrates high-pitched clean vocals typical of Risecore aesthetics.: file; help

Audio sample
- "Chain of Memories" by I Am King. Illustrates the blend of pop-style clean vocals with aggressive screaming, a core feature of Risecore.: file; help

Risecore is a subgenre of metalcore popular from late 2000s to mid 2010s. The style is often associated with the Warped Tour scene and was popularized largely by bands on Rise Records, though it includes acts from various labels.

== History ==
In the mid-2000s, many pop screamo bands began to push their music further into the prevailing metalcore sound, particularly Alesana, Drop Dead, Gorgeous, Blessthefall and From First to Last. In turn, Drop Dead, Gorgeous, Alesana, Blessthefall, A Skylit Drive and Escape the Fate became early pioneers of Risecore. By the end of the decade, this style had been popularised by Attack Attack!, the Devil Wears Prada, I See Stars, We Came As Romans and Of Mice & Men.

Singer Courtney LaPlante of iwrestledabearonce and Spiritbox reflected on the genre's context within the broader metalcore timeline, noting how Risecore stood apart from other scenes like the Botch/Misery Signals or Killswitch Engage /As I Lay Dying schools of metalcore.

By early 2012, Risecore had declined in popularity, as the metalcore scene shifted towards srscore.

== Characteristics ==
The genre blends heavy screamed vocals and breakdowns with melodic, often featuring high-pitched clean-sung choruses drawing from pop music and post-hardcore. Risecore balances aggression with melody and commercial appeal, often incorporating pop elements into clean vocals. While screaming is a common trait, some bands such as Hands Like Houses, Miss Fortune and Alive Like Me omit harsh vocals entirely, yet retain the genre's characteristic structures, instrumentation, and breakdown use.

== Reception ==
Risecore has been the subject of criticism for its incorporation of pop-oriented vocal melodies and polished production. Detractors often label the genre "popcore", arguing it diverges from the raw aggression of 1990s metalcore and the complexity of earlier post-hardcore. Critics also note that some fans of traditional metalcore and post-hardcore reject the validity of Risecore as part of those lineages.

== See also ==
- Electronicore
- Rise Records
- Scene music
