= Straight to Hell =

Straight to Hell may refer to:

== Music ==
=== Albums ===
- Straight to Hell (soundtrack), the soundtrack of the 1987 film
- Straight to Hell (album), a 2006 album by Hank Williams III
- Headfirst Straight to Hell, the fifth and final full-length album by Grade in 2001

=== Songs ===
- "Straight to Hell" (The Clash song), 1982
- "Straight to Hell" (Drivin N Cryin song), 1989, also recorded by Darius Rucker
- "Straight to Hell", a song on the 2001 album Welcome to the Other Side by German heavy metal band Rage
- "Straight to Hell" , 2019 song by Ozzy Osbourne from Ordinary Man

== Film and television ==
- Straight to Hell (film), a 1987 independent action-comedy film directed by Alex Cox
- Straight to Hell (Kathy Griffin special), a 2007 comedy special by stand-up comic Kathy Griffin
- "Straight to Hell" (Daredevil: Born Again), an episode of Daredevil: Born Again
- Straight to Hell (TV series), a 2026 Netflix Japanese drama television series

== Publishing ==
- S.T.H., an acronym for Straight to Hell, a gay pornographic magazine
