= Quannnic =

American rock musician

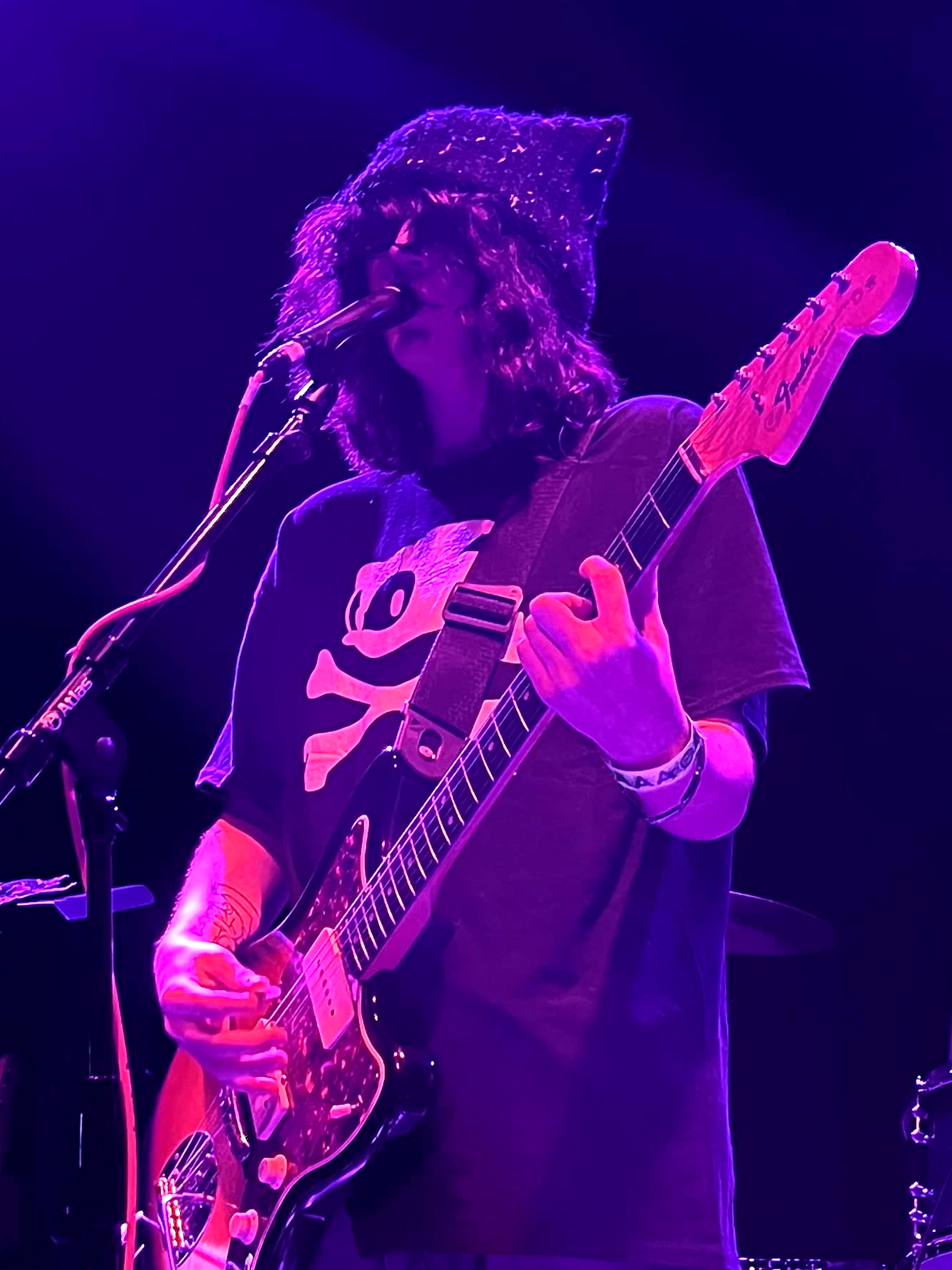
- Quannnic performing in Santa Ana, California, February 8, 2024

Background information
- Also known as: Zoe, Cure Id 92
- Born: Nick Quan; December 5, 2004 (age 21)
- Origin: Florida, U.S.
- Genres: Zoomergaze; shoegaze; emo; digicore (early)
- Years active: 2020–present
- Labels: DeadAir; Santa Anna
- Member of: Car Underwater; Helix Tears
- Formerly of: Twerknation28
- Website: quannnic.com

Nick Quan (born December 5, 2004), known professionally as Quannnic (stylized in all lowercase), is an American musician. Initially presenting a digicore sound, they began releasing music as Quannnic in late 2020 and released their debut studio album, Kenopsia, in February 2022. A track from the album, "Life Imitates Life", went viral on TikTok and charted on Billboard's Hot Hard Rock Songs.

Quannnic's second studio album, Stepdream, was released in November 2023, and they later co-headlined an American tour with Jane Remover. Their third album, Warbrained, was released in August 2025. That year, they joined the band Car Underwater. On Quannnic's musical style, sources mostly described it as shoegaze, with Kenopsia mixing glitch elements and Stepdream emo.

== Career ==
Originally from Florida, Quannnic has played guitar since they were six. They initially presented a digicore sound and became popular by their pop rap songs. However, by 2021, they felt creatively constrained by that sound and began shifting towards more rock-oriented styles; that year, they started releasing music under the name Quannnic. Their debut studio album, Kenopsia, was independently released in February 2022. In early 2023, a track from the album, "Life Imitates Life", went viral on TikTok. By November, the song had been used in 16,000 clips on the platform, and it charted at number 23 on Billboard's Hot Hard Rock Songs with 525,000 official streams earned in the U.S; on Spotify, it had 30 million streams by December. On its popularity, Quannnic said: "It was just really weird to me that something I made when I was 16 could get this much attention now. It impacted the way I make music. It got a lot more stressful." The album was later reissued by DeadAir Records.

Quannnic released Stepdream, their second studio album, in November 2023. They co-headlined Jane Remover's 2024 U.S. tour, which began in February of that year. Quannnic played at the Sick New World Festival on April 27, 2024. In November, they opened for Slowdive at their American tour. Their third album, Warbrained, was released in August 2025.

=== Car Underwater ===
Quannnic is part of the band Car Underwater, which formed in 2025. The band consists of Quannnic on guitar, lead vocalist Max Epstein (formerly of Militarie Gun and Wisp), keyboardist and vocalist Darcy Baylis (of Resenter and Sugar High), drummer Zach Capitti-Fenton (of Momma), guitarist and backing vocalist Sonny Foster (of Versera), and bassist Nolan Nunes (Ghostemane and If I Die First). They opened for Bring Me the Horizon's July 10 release show for the rerecording of Count Your Blessings. They are a part of the 2020s pop screamo revival alongside I Promised the World and Static Dress.

== Musical style ==
Quannnic's profile at AllMusic says they blend shoegaze, lo-fi, noise, and electronic bedroom pop. Philip Sherburne of Pitchfork described Quannnic's music as containing much Auto-Tune and "post-everything bedroom beats", which "restored some of shoegaze's crystalline detail in their sparkling, digitally rendered high end". Eli Enis of Stereogum said that Quannnic's music has an "artificial rumble" comparable to Parannoul's computerized sound in To See the Next Part of the Dream. Quannnic has named Superheaven and Basement as influences.

Although Quannnic employed various digital instruments on Kenopsia, they prefer using a real guitar to create their shoegaze elements. Eli Enis of Stereogum described Kenopsia as a mix between shoegaze, the glitchy elements of digicore, and Deftones-like nu-gaze, with a singing akin to emo-rap. Jordan Darville of The Fader wrote that it "embraced glitch-pop and the anime intro electronics of Porter Robinson", being similar to old songs by Jane Remover. Singaporean band Sobs chose Kenopsia as one of their favorite albums of 2022 to Brooklyn Vegan, with member Celine saying: "Indie rock melodies glimmering with autotune over a gloomy hyperpop-meets-shoegaze backdrop. Perfect record for the post-internet music consumer". Kristen S. Hé of Junkee said that "Life Imitates Life" could be "mistaken for a lo-fi Deftones cover"; Quannnic said that the track was inspired by that band and Paramore, and Enis highlighted its "grungy" elements.

Enis found Stepdream to be influenced by Elliott Smith and Jeff Buckley and felt that Quannnic "swerved in a more collegiate singer-songwriter direction" with it. Similarly, Darville wrote that the album shows Quannnic's capabilities "as a songwriter of brooding guitar-based jams". He felt that, "[b]eneath the foggy textures and hazily cooed lyrics, there's a real sense of stakes on Stepdream, like its songs are Quannnic's last, best chance to define [themselves]". Leor Galil of Chicago Reader said that Stepdream is inspired by alternative rock subgenres such as emo and shoegaze. Abby Kenna of Ones to Watch said that, with the album, "Quannnic refines their unique perspective, blending their influences that reach from metal to folk while keeping their voice and emotional turmoil consistent."

== Personal life ==
Quannnic is non-binary and uses they/them pronouns.

== Discography ==
=== Studio albums ===
Title	Album details
Kenopsia	Released: February 28, 2022; Label: Self-released (initial release); DeadAir (re-release); Formats: LP, CD, cassette, digital download, streaming
Stepdream	Released: November 10, 2023; Label: DeadAir; Formats: LP, digital download, streaming
Warbrained	Released: August 22, 2025; Label: DeadAir; Formats: LP, CD, digital download, streaming

=== Extended plays ===
Title	Album details
M0th3r6or3d	Released: October 29, 2026; Label: Santa Anna; Formats: Streaming

=== Singles ===
Title	Year	Album
"Replica"	2021	Non-album singles
"One Second of Sympathy"	2021	Non-album singles
"Come Down From Above" (with D0llywood1)	2021	Non-album singles
"Reach"	2021	Non-album singles
"Nail"	2021	Kenopsia
"Think With Your Lungs"	2021	Kenopsia
"What Does This Room Look Like"	2021	Kenopsia
"Life Imitates Life"	2021	Kenopsia
"Cards"	2022	Non-album singles
"Sheets" (demo)	2022	Non-album singles
"A Mind of Her Own" (Pedro the Lion cover)	2022	Non-album singles
"Comatose"	2023	Stepdream
"How to Hold a Knife"	2023	Stepdream
"South"	2023	Stepdream
"Wrenches"	2025	Warbrained
"Observer"	2025	Warbrained
"Aviator"	2025	Warbrained
"Korg"	2026	M0th3r6or3d

=== Music videos ===
Song	Year	Director
"Life Imitates Life"	2023	Rich Smith & Fiona Kane
"Comatose"	2023	BlindLight & Yams
"Rummage" (featuring Orbiting Human Circus)	2023	BlindLight
"Observer"	2025	BlindLight & Midvessel
"Aviator"	2025	BlindLight
"Korg"	2026	BlindLight

=== As featured artist ===
Song	Year	Release
"Roman Candle" (Ch111oe featuring Quannnic)	2025	Non-album single
