= I Promised the World =

American metalcore band

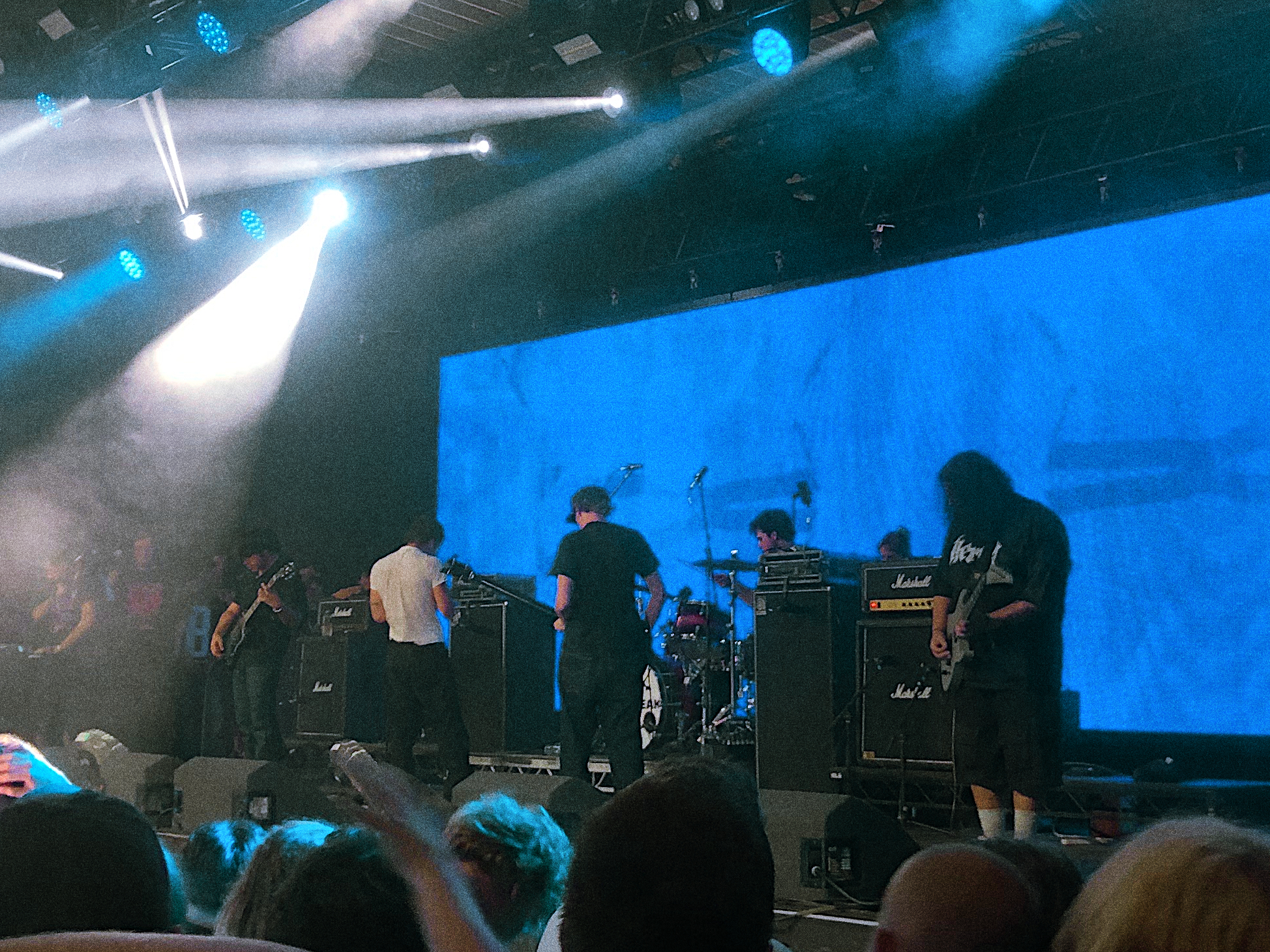
- I Promised the World performing live in 2026

Background information
- Also known as: Sw!tch (2020–2023); Sinema (2023–2025)
- Origin: Denton, Texas, U.S.
- Genres: Pop screamo; metalcore; emo; melodic metalcore; post-hardcore
- Years active: 2020–present
- Labels: Rise; Ephyra
- Members: Caleb Molina; Hunter Wilson; Mason Nowlin; Mason Zschau; Rivers Shutt; Zain Omar
- Past members: Marshall Stubbs; Drew Safstrom; Jackson Douglas; Aidan Vickers

I Promised the World is an American metalcore band from Denton, Texas. Formed in 2020 as Sw!tch, they released their debut album Stuck In The Details in 2022. The following year, they changed their name to Sinema and began pursuing a heavier pop screamo style. Sinema released the EP After the Flatline (2023), album Fear of the Fall (2024) and the split EP Consider It Your Fault with xheartworksx. They changed their name to I Promised the World in 2025, immediately releasing the split EP The Snowball Effect with onewaymirror and Kiowa, which saw them lean further into metalcore. In November 2025, they signed to Rise Records, who released their self-titled EP on January 16, 2026.

== History ==
Denton, Texas resident Caleb Molina began writing music following the death of his father after a prolonged hospitalization due to COVID-19 in 2020. He and friend Hunter Wilson decided to form a band, due to their shared interest in Slowdive and 4AD artists. Originally named Sw!tch, they released their debut single "Deceptive" on August 27, 2021. This was followed by their debut album Stuck in the Details on November 10, 2022. At this time, their lineup consisted of Wilson on guitar and vocals, Molina on guitar and vocals and Marshall Stubbs drums and vocals, as well as session bassist Drew Safstrom. They spent much of their early years performing alongside local Denton Midwest emo and screamo bands.

In 2023, they changed their name to Sinema, which was derived from their friend's graffiti tag. At this time, they used "ipromisedtheworld" as their social media handle. On May 10, 2024, they released the split EP Consider It Your Fault with xheartworksx. In August 2024, they released their debut album Fear of the Fall. Much of this material was first written during 2020, with lyrics discussing Molina's father's death. Its cover artwork features a printed strip of his father’s final heartbeat.

In May 2025, the band changed their name to I Promised the World due to other acts sharing the name Sinema, a name derived from Saosin's song "Translating the Name". On May 30, they released the split EP The Snowball Effect with onewaymirror and Kiowa. That November, they announced their signing with Rise Records, accompanied by a self titled EP I Promised the World, which was released on January 16, 2026. Eli Enis noted this as a major development in their wave of early 2000s metalcore revival that originated from the hardcore scene, as their contemporaries had largely been "expressly antagonistic" to the Risecore style that the record label had helped to define. The band released a music video for the single "Bliss in 7 Languages" through Rise Records. Between November 8 and 23, they toured the United States with Koyo. In late 2025, bassist Aidan Vickers would quietly leave the group due to personal reasons. Vickers' last appearance with the group would be on December 6th, 2025 at No Sleep Fest, an annual hardcore festival based in Houston, Texas. The group then added Rivers Shutt after Vickers' departure. Between March 13 and April 12, they toured the United States supporting the Devil Wears Prada, alongside Split Chain and Four Year Strong.

== Musical style ==
Critics have categorized I Promised the World's music as emo, metalcore, post-hardcore, melodic metalcore and pop screamo.

They emerged from early 2000s-style metalcore revival of the 2020s, alongside Static Dress, Killing Me Softly and xSeraphx, but subverted that trend by beginning to take more heavily from mid-2000s, such as From Autumn to Ashes, Misery Signals and Hopesfall. Their music made use of cleaner production than many of their influences and contemporaries Writing for Stereogum, Tom Breihan described the track as reflecting early-2000s post-hardcore and metalcore aesthetics, situating the band within a broader revival of that style. Eli Enis called their songs "tedious commitments to the Underoath doctrine that's yielded 20 years of bad choruses sandwiched in between awesome breakdowns".

Their music draws heavily from early 2000s post-hardcore and emo influences, taking influences from bands such as Armor for Sleep, Saosin, Panic! at the Disco, Misery Signals, American Football, BadBadNotGood, Sleeping with Sirens, Lamb of God, Taking Back Sunday, Coheed and Cambria, Alexisonfire, Poison the Well, Hopesfall and Glassjaw. They also cited the local Midwest emo and screamo bands they performed alongside in the early career as having an impact on their sound.

== Discography ==
=== Albums ===
- Stuck In The Details (2022) (as Sw!tch)
- Fear of the Fall (2024) (as Sinema)

=== EPs ===
- After the Flatline (2023) (as Sinema)
- I Promised the World (2026)

=== Splits ===
- Consider It Your Fault (2024, with xheartworksx) (as Sinema)
- The Snowball Effect (2025, with onewaymirror and Kiowa)

=== Singles ===
- "I Can't See Through The Mirror" (2023) (as Sinema)
- "At Least, Be Human" (2024) (as Sinema)
- "Bliss in 7 Languages" (2025)
- "A Pure Expression" (2025)

== Band members ==
Current

- Caleb Molina - guitars, vocals (2020–present)
- Hunter Wilson - vocals (2020–present), guitars (2020–2023)
- Mason Nowlin - guitars (2023–present)
- Mason Zschau - drums (2023–present)
- Rivers Shutt - bass (2025–present)
- Zain Omar - keyboards (2026–present)

Former

- Marshall Stubbs – drums, vocals (2020–2023)
- Drew Safstrom – bass (2022)
- Jackson Douglas - bass (2022–2024)
- Aidan Vickers - bass (2024–2025)

Timeline
