= Warbrained =

2025 studio album by Quannnic

Studio album by Quannnic
- Released: August 22, 2025
- Genre: Shoegaze; indie rock; emo
- Length: 44:44
- Label: DeadAir
- Producer: Quannnic

Quannnic chronology
Stepdream (2023)	Warbrained (2025)

Singles from Warbrained
- 1. "Wrenches" Released: January 24, 2025; 2. "Observer" Released: June 20, 2025; 3. "Aviator" Released: August 1, 2025

Warbrained is the third studio album by the American musician Quannnic. It was released on August 22, 2025, via DeadAir Records. It was preceded by the singles "Wrenches", "Observer", and "Aviator". Writing and production on the album was handled entirely by Quannnic.

Lyrically, Warbrained is a loose concept album about a military veteran struggling with post-traumatic stress disorder and spiraling mentally.

== Background ==
Quannnic released the album's first single, "Wrenches", on January 24, 2025. A shoegaze song, it was described by BrooklynVegan as "hazy" and "hooky". The title, cover art, and release date for Warbrained were officially announced on June 20, alongside the release of its second single, "Observer". The song's music video, directed by BlindLight and Midvessel, was described by Neville Hardman of Alternative Press as feeling like a "dark hallucination", with a "trio of ghoulish surgeons [performing] an operation in the background". The album's tracklist was also revealed by Alternative Press on June 23. On June 24, Quannnic announced their first-ever headlining tour in support of the album, which began in September and concluded in October, and included DeadAir labelmate Kmoe as the opening act. The album's third single, "Aviator", was released on August 1, alongside a music video directed by BlindLight.

== Track listing ==
Warbrained track listing
No.	Title	Length
1.	"Prunesnail"	4:21
2.	"Wrenches"	5:01
3.	"Aviator"	4:55
4.	"Scolder"	3:52
5.	"Torch"	4:41
6.	"Paperweight"	4:28
7.	"Heavensafe"	3:32
8.	"Observer"	4:13
9.	"Floorface"	4:06
10.	"Wardeath"	5:35
Total length:		44:44
