= Headfirst Straight to Hell =

Studio album by Grade
- Released: August 21, 2001
- Genre: emocore
- Label: Victory Records

Grade chronology
| The Embarrassing Beginning (2000) | Headfirst Straight to Hell (2001) |

Headfirst Straight to Hell is the fifth full-length album by the Canadian hardcore band Grade. It is the most recent album released by the band.

== Track listing ==
1. "Termites Hollow"
2. "Becoming Not Being"
3. "In The Wake Of Poseidon"
4. "Bleeding Warn And Newly Dead"
5. "Overthrowing Creation Itself"
6. "Little Satisfactions"
7. "Vertical Transmission"
8. "Will Bending"
9. "In Ashes We Lie"
10. "Sixth Chamber"
11. "The Empress"
12. "Twenty Moons"
13. "Winds Of Hell/The Glorious Dead"
