= And Such Is Progress =

Studio album by Grade
- Released: 1995; October 17, 1997 (rerelease)
- Genre: Hardcore punk Screamo
- Label: Second Nature Recordings

Grade chronology
And Such Is Progress (1995)	Separate the Magnets (1997)

And Such Is Progress is the first full-length studio album by the hardcore band Grade. It was released in 1995 on Capsule Records. It was later re-released by Toybox Records and Second Nature Recordings in 1995 and 1998.

The song "Ziggy Stardust" is a cover of the David Bowie song.

== Track listing ==
1. "Weave"
2. "Miracle Ear"
3. "CFNY"
4. "Bedhead"
5. "Tearjerk"
6. "Hive"
7. "Pocket Rocket"
8. "And Such Is Progress"
9. "Chancre"
10. "Not Heroic"
11. "Abandon The Need"
12. "We'll Get There, Just Not Yet"
13. "Ziggy Stardust"
