= Grade (band) =

Canadian melodic hardcore band

- Origin: Burlington, Ontario, Canada
- Genres: Screamo; emo; metalcore (early)
- Years active: 1994–2002; 2009-present
- Label: Victory Records = Second Nature Recordings
- Spinoffs: Acrid, The Swarm, Jersey, To The Lions
- Members: Kyle Bishop; Matt Jones; Shawn Magill; Greg Taylor; Matt Richmond
- Past members: Kevin Harris; Chris Danner; Charles Moniz; Brad Casarin; Silas Barrette; Kent Abbott

Grade is a hardcore punk band from Burlington, Ontario, often credited as pioneers in blending metallic hardcore with the rawness and emotion of emo, and - most notably - the alternating screaming/singing style later popularized by bands like Taking Back Sunday and Thursday. Formed in 1994, Grade found inspiration in the hardcore bands Integrity and Chokehold. By 1995, however, they had discovered Indian Summer and Rye Coalition and began developing the sound and style for which they had become known.

== History ==
Four of the members of Grade previously played in the band Incision, with a different bassist, from 1992 to 1993, releasing two demo tapes. In late 1993, the band briefly broke up but reformed under the name Rebirth. After only two shows, Rebirth recruited bassist Matt Jones (who was then also playing in the band Sun Still Burns) and changed name to Grade in January 1994. The name was chosen in reference to Lincoln's song "Grade Curve". Grade released their debut three-song demo tape in February 1994 through Workshop Records.

Though And Such Is Progress would eventually be hailed as a "landmark album," it was not until 1997, when Grade released Separate the Magnets and toured with Hot Water Music, that they began to develop a following. During this time, band members collaborated in several side-projects. Bishop played in Acrid; Jones played in SeventyEightDays; Bishop and Jones played in The Swarm aka Knee Deep in the Dead; and Bishop played in Tomb of the Worm; Taylor and Harris played in Jersey.

In 1999, Grade signed with Victory Records and released Under the Radar, the album for which they had become best known. Under the Radar spawned two singles, the videos for which received some play on MTV2 in 1999 and 2000. In 2000, the band toured Europe and the United Kingdom, meeting up with American melodic hardcore band As Friends Rust for several cross-over shows.

In 2001, Grade released their fourth and final full-length album, Headfirst Straight to Hell, before disbanding approximately one year later. Jones, Magill, Danner and Casarin all went on to play in To the Lions.

Since their break-up, Grade have reunited several times, beginning with a 2006 show in Toronto. In 2010, they wrote and recorded two new songs for a split 7-inch with Bane. In 2013, Grade performed at Pouzza Fest in Montreal. In 2014, they toured the northeastern U.S. with Ensign.

== Influences ==
On Grade's earliest releases their influences were Integrity and Chokehold. On ...And Such is Progress (1995), they embraced the influence of Indian Summer, Rye Coalition and Lincoln. In a 2026 interview, Greg Taylor said of this time "because of what we were doing and the music and bands that we were playing with kind of just influenced us to change", noting examples as performances alongside the Get Up Kids, Braid, Coalesce and Hot Water Music as well as the emo and screamo bands on Ebullition Records. On Under the Radar (1999), they took influence from Lifetime, Hot Water Music and Dillinger Four. In 2002, Kyle Bishop cited the Haunted, In Flames, Cradle of Filth, Slayer, Iron Maiden, Led Zeppelin, Motley Crüe, Ramones, Hüsker Dü, the Smiths and Jeff Buckley.

== Legacy ==
When asked by Noisey in 2014 if he ever felt bitter for a lack of recognition, singer Kyle Bishop stated, "There's a lot of accolades that people give us for supposedly starting something and I think that's all bullshit, to be honest with you. I think that a billion bands were doing similar things before us and after that deserve just as much credit. And if we do get some credit from certain people, awesome. If we don't, it doesn't really matter because I really don't think it's true anyway."

They have been cited as an influence by Atreyu, Senses Fail, Silverstein, the Used and Boys Night Out.

== Discography ==
=== Albums ===
- And Such Is Progress (1995 Capsule Records, repress May 1997 Toybox Records, repress 1998 Second Nature Recordings)
- Separate the Magnets (1997 Second Nature Recordings)
- Under the Radar (October 12, 1999 Victory Records)
- The Embarrassing Beginning (November 21, 2000 Victory Records)
- Headfirst Straight to Hell (August 21, 2001 Victory Records)

=== EPs ===
- Grade (1996, Wheatfield Press Records)
- Triumph & Tragedy (1999, Victory Records)
- Collapsed Lungs (2014, Dine Alone Records)

=== Split albums ===
- Split CD with Believe (1994, Workshop Records)
- Split 12-inch with Incision (1999, Workshop Records)
- Split 7-inch with Bane (2010, At Both Ends Magazine)

=== Compilations ===
- Making the Impossible Possible (1999)
- Victory Style 4 (March 28, 2000)
- Rock Music: A Tribute to Weezer (February 5, 2002)
- Punk Chunk 2 (February 15, 2002)
- Victory Style 5 (April 9, 2002)
- Smoking Popes Tribute (March 23, 2003)
- Punk Goes Acoustic (October 21, 2003)
- Initial Records Punk Rock Sampler

== See also ==
- List of bands from Canada
