= The Embarrassing Beginning =

Studio album by Grade
- Released: November 21, 2000
- Genre: Hardcore punk, screamo
- Label: Victory

Grade chronology
Under the Radar (1999)	The Embarrassing Beginning (2000)	Headfirst Straight to Hell (2001)

The Embarrassing Beginning is a compilation album by Canadian hardcore punk band Grade. It is a combination of two older releases with new packaging. The first eight songs are from Grade's first proper release, Grade/Believe split released on a small Canadian label called Workshop Records back in 1994. Tracks 11–13 come from the group's 1999 debut EP on Victory Records Triumph and Tragedy.

== Track listing ==
1. "Cripple"
2. "Punk Rock Song"
3. "Impulse"
4. "Hairdie"
5. "Digga Digga Song"
6. "Classified"
7. "Instrumental"
8. "Entangled"
9. "Afterthought (Demo)"
10. "The Tension Between Stillness & Motion (Demo)"
11. "Triumph & Tragedy (Acoustic Version)"
12. "Stolen Bikes Ride Faster"
13. "Panama"
14. "A Year In The Past (Radio Version)"
15. "Seamless (Acoustic Version)"
