= Alive Like Me =

American rock band (2013–2016, 2021)

- Origin: Eugene, Oregon, United States
- Genres: Alternative rock; post-hardcore; pop punk
- Years active: 2013–2016, 2021
- Label: Rise
- Past members: Brandon Banton; Jairus Kersey; Dakota Dufloth; David Knox; Joel Riley; Jared Land
- Website: alivelikeme.com (defunct)

Alive Like Me was a short-lived American rock band from Eugene, Oregon, formed in 2013. The band was signed to Rise Records. Their debut album, Only Forever, was released on October 3, 2014.

== History ==
The band formed in 2013, when lead singer Jairus Kersey and bassist David Knox decided to give their adolescent dreams one more shot. They put out an ad on Craigslist searching for a drummer and guitarist to complete the band. The ad was soon answered by guitarist Dakota Dufloth and drummer Joel Riley. After meeting several times they all found that they had similar goals for their future and meshed well as a group. Dufloth and Riley made the move from Portland, Oregon to Eugene, Oregon and the band began working on songs and circulating them around to different labels with the help of their friend Craig Ericson, who is the owner of Rise Records and the guitarist for the band, Defeat The Low. The band soon had the attention of several record labels but held out for their dream label, Rise Records. The band played an impromptu show in the basement of Ericson's home and two weeks later were offered a deal. In January 2014, Alive Like Me, signed with Rise Records and soon began work on their first studio album. They released their first single "Start Again" not long after signing with their label. They followed that release with another single titled " Slip Away". Their full album, Only Forever, was released on October 6, 2014. They have been touring North America and Europe since the release of their first single and played in the Vans Warped Tour in 2014 and 2015.

On May 17, 2016, the band announced on their Facebook page that they're taking an indefinite hiatus.

In 2021, the band released a new EP titled "Definitely Not Cats", their first new material in seven years, which featured a drastically different sound from their debut album.

== Band members ==
Former members

- Brandon Banton – rhythm guitar (2013–2015)
- Dakota Dufloth – lead guitar, backing vocals (2013–2016; 2021)
- Jairus Kersey – lead vocals (2013–2016; 2021)
- David Knox – bass guitar, backing vocals (2013–2016; 2021)
- Joel Riley – drums, percussion (2013–2016; 2021)

== Discography ==
Studio albums

- Only Forever (2014)

EPs

- Definitely Not Cats (2021)
