= Under the Radar (Grade album) =

Studio album by Grade
- Released: October 5, 1999
- Genre: Screamo, emocore
- Label: Victory

Grade chronology
Separate the Magnets (1997)	Under the Radar (1999)	The Embarrassing Beginning (2000)

Under the Radar is the third full-length studio album by the hardcore band Grade. It was released by Victory Records on October 5, 1999.

== Track listing ==
1. "The Inefficiency of Emotion"
2. "For The Memory of Love"
3. "Seamless"
4. "The Tension Between Stillness and Motion"
5. "Victims of Mathematics"
6. "A Year in the Past, Forever in the Future"
7. "The Worst Lies Are Told in Silence"
8. "Second Chance at First Place"
9. "Stolen Bikes Ride Faster"
10. "When Something Goes to Your Head"
11. "Triumph and Tragedy"

== Reception and legacy ==
Professional ratings
Review scores
Source	Rating
AllMusic	4/5 stars
