= Separate the Magnets =

Studio album by Grade
- Released: July 24, 1998
- Genre: Emocore, hardcore punk
- Label: Second Nature Recordings

Grade chronology
And Such Is Progress (1997)	Separate the Magnets (1998)	Under the Radar (1999)

Separate the Magnets is the second full-length studio album by the hardcore band Grade.

== Track listing ==
1. "Conceptualizing Theories In Motion"
2. "Symptoms Of Simplifying The Simplistic"
3. "The Adaptation Of Means"
4. "Life Gets In The Way Of Living"
5. "To Illustrate And Design Parameters"
6. "The Joy Of Stupidity"
7. "The Tie That Binds"
