= Only Forever (Alive Like Me album) =

Studio album by Alive Like Me
- Released: October 3, 2014
- Genre: Alternative rock; post-hardcore; pop punk
- Length: 38:13
- Label: Rise
- Producer: Ryan Furlott

Alive Like Me chronology
Only Forever (2014)	Definitely Not Cats (2021)

Singles from Only Forever
- 1. "Start Again" Released: January 29, 2014; 2. "Searching for Endings" Released: July 11, 2014; 3. "Slip Away" Released: July 17, 2014; 4. "Our Time Down Here" Released: September 30, 2014; 5. "What Did You Expect" Released: February 18, 2015

Only Forever is the debut and only studio album by American rock band Alive Like Me. It was released in October 2014.

Based in the college town of Eugene, Oregon, singer Jairus Kersey, guitarists Brandon Banton and Dakota Dufloth, bassist David Knox, and drummer Joel Riley quickly built momentum releasing their first single "Start Again". As their reputation grew, they came to the attention of prominent Oregon indie Rise Records, who signed the band in early 2014. After joining the Vans Warped Tour for several dates that summer, they released their debut album, Only Forever, in October 2014.

== Track listing ==
Standard edition
No.	Title	Length
1.	"Better Off"	2:54
2.	"Slip Away"	3:48
3.	"What Did You Expect"	4:10
4.	"Our Time Down Here"	2:51
5.	"Start Again"	2:59
6.	"Only Forever"	3:42
7.	"Wreckage"	3:20
8.	"Searching for Endings"	3:53
9.	"Lost Without You"	3:38
10.	"Meant for This"	3:27
11.	"Never Looking Back"	3:31
Total length:		38:13

Japanese bonus tracks
No.	Title	Length
12.	"Meant for This" (acoustic version)	3:21
13.	"Only Forever" (Scout remix)	3:58
14.	"Better Off" (Scout remix)	3:05
Total length:		48:37

== Personnel ==
Credits for Only Forever adapted from AllMusic.

Alive Like Me

- Brandon Banton – guitars
- Dakota Dufloth – guitars
- Jairus Kersey – vocals
- David Knox – bass guitar
- Joel Riley – drums, percussion

Production

- Kris Crummett – mastering
- Ryan Furlott – producer
- Mike Kalajian – engineering
- Matthew Kirby – editing
- Dan Korneff – mixing
- Alex Prieto – engineering

== Charts ==
Chart (2014)	Peak position
Billboard Top Heatseekers	26
