= The Weakerthans discography =

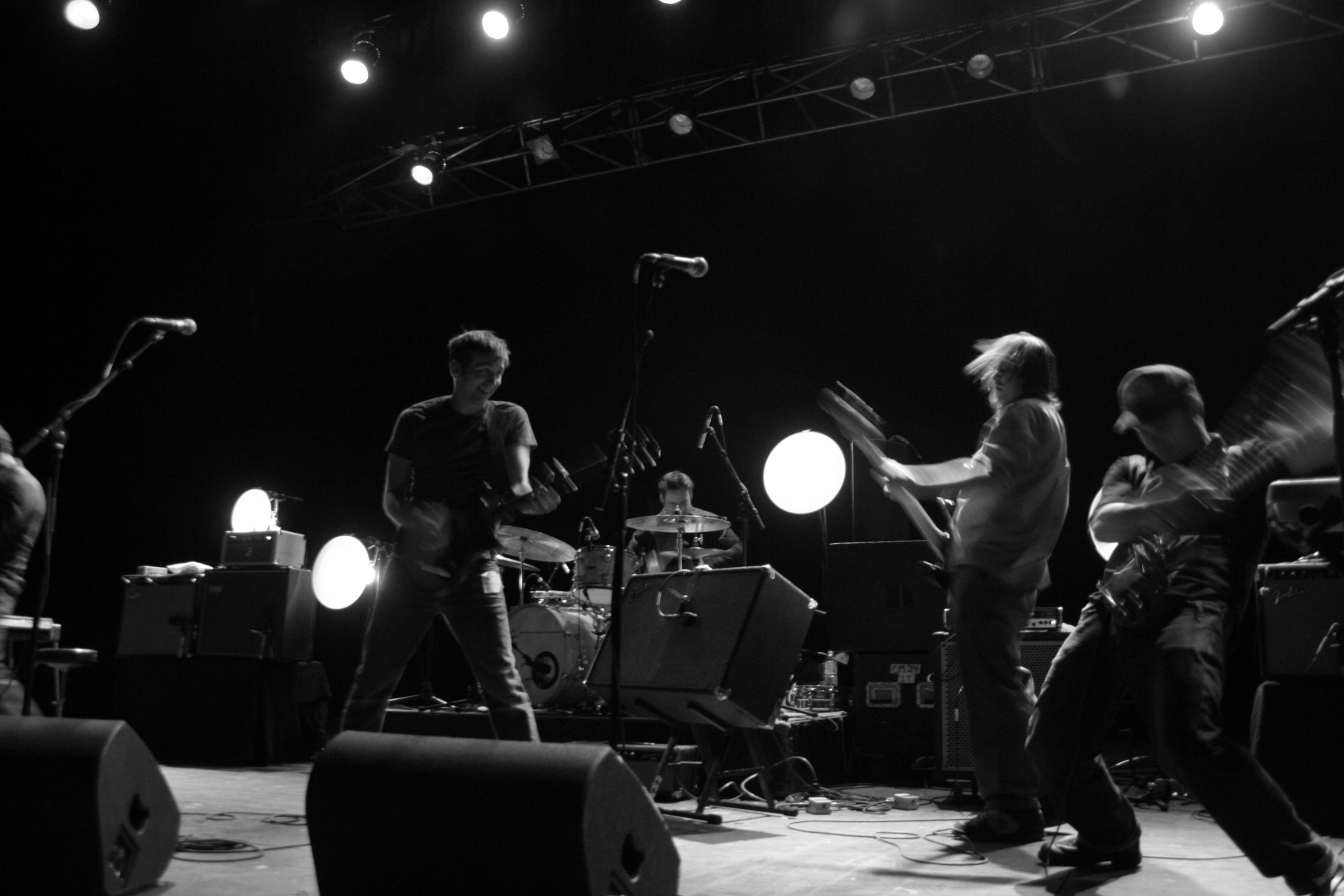
- The Weakerthans performing in 2007 in support of Reunion Tour
- Studio albums: 4
- Extended plays: 1
- Singles: 1
- Video albums: 1
- Music videos: 8
- Other appearances: 7

The discography of The Weakerthans, a Canadian indie rock band, consists of four studio albums, one live album and concert video, one EP, one single, and eight music videos.

The Weakerthans formed in Winnipeg in 1997 with the lineup of John K. Samson (vocals, guitar), John P. Sutton (bass guitar), and Jason Tait (drums). Their debut album Fallow was released in Canada in December of that year through G7 Welcoming Committee Records, a label founded by Samson's former bandmates in Propagandhi, with a United States release following in 1999 through Sub City Records. Stephen Carroll performed on the album as a guest musician, and soon joined the band as second guitarist. Left and Leaving was released in July 2000, through G7 Welcoming Committee in Canada and Sub City in the United States. A single for "Watermark" followed in January 2001.

The band signed to Epitaph Records and released Reconstruction Site in 2003. It was their first album to chart, reaching no. 28 on Billboard's Independent Albums. Sutton left the band in 2004 and was replaced by Greg Smith. The new lineup released Reunion Tour in September 2007 through Epitaph and its subsidiary label ANTI-. It became their highest-charting album, reaching no. 181 on the Billboard 200. The iTunes-exclusive Live Session EP was released in 2009, with a full live album and concert video, Live at the Burton Cummings Theatre, following in March 2010.

The Weakerthans also performed on Jim Bryson's 2010 album The Falcon Lake Incident, credited to Jim Bryson and The Weakerthans. Carroll, Smith, and Tait also performed on Greg Graffin's 2006 album Cold as the Clay.

== Studio albums ==
Year	Album details	Peak chart positions		
Year	Album details	US		
Year	Album details	Billboard 200	Independent	Heatseekers
1997	Fallow: Released: December 7, 1997; Label: G7 Welcoming Committee (G7003); Format: LP, CD	—	—	—
2000	Left and Leaving: Released: July 25, 2000; Label: G7 Welcoming Committee (G7013); Format: LP, CD	—	—	—
2003	Reconstruction Site: Released: August 26, 2003; Label: Epitaph (86682); Format: LP, CD	—	28	49
2007	Reunion Tour: Released: September 25, 2007; Label: Epitaph/ANTI- (86877); Format: LP, CD	181	28	7
"—" denotes releases that did not chart.

== Live albums ==
Year	Album details	Peak chart positions
Year	Album details	US
Year	Album details	Heatseekers
2010	Live at the Burton Cummings Theatre: Released: March 23, 2010; Label: Epitaph/ANTI- (87067); Format: LP, CD/DVD	31

== EPs ==
Year	EP details
2009	Live Session EP: Released: June 19, 2009; Label: Epitaph; Format: download

== Singles ==
Year	Single	Album
2001	"Watermark"	Left and Leaving

== Video albums ==
Year	Video details
2010	Live at the Burton Cummings Theatre: Released: March 23, 2010; Label: Epitaph/ANTI- (87067); Formats: DVD

== Music videos ==
Year	Song	Director	Album
1997	"Diagnosis"		Fallow
2000	"Watermark"		Left and Leaving
2003	"Psalm for the Elks Lodge Last Call"		Reconstruction Site
2003	"The Reasons"		Reconstruction Site
2003	"Our Retired Explorer (Dines with Michel Foucault in Paris, 1961)"		Reconstruction Site
2007	"Civil Twilight"		Reunion Tour
2007	"Tournament of Hearts"		Reunion Tour
2007	"Sun in an Empty Room"		Reunion Tour

== Other appearances ==
The following Weakerthans songs were released on compilation albums. This is not an exhaustive list; songs that were first released on the band's albums and singles are not included.

Year	Release details	Track(s)
1999	Take Action!: Released: June 22, 1999; Label: Sub City; Format: CD	"Everything Must Go!" (alternate version)
1999	Return of the Read Menace: Released: August 15, 1999; Label: G7 Welcoming Committee (G7010); Format: CD	"Ringing of Revolution" (originally performed by Phil Ochs)
2000	Hopelessly Devoted to You, Vol. 3: Released: October 3, 2000; Label: Hopeless (HR648); Format: CD	"Confessions of a Futon-Revolutionist" (live, country style)
2002	Hopelessly Devoted to You, Vol. 4: Released: June 25, 2002; Label: Hopeless (HR662); Format: CD	"(Past-Due)" (acoustic)
2005	Take Penacilin Now: Released: July 12, 2005; Label: G7 Welcoming Committee (G7040); Format: CD	"My Favourite Power Chords"
2007	The Secret Sessions: Released: March 16, 2007; Label: Zunior; Format: CD, download	"Bad Time to Be Poor" (originally performed by the Rheostatics)
2010	Germs of Perfection: A Tribute to Bad Religion: Released: October 19, 2010; Label: Myspace/Spin; Format: download	"Sanity" (originally performed by Bad Religion)
