= Greg Smith (Canadian musician) =

- Origin: Woodstock, Ontario, Canada
- Genres: Folk rock, indie rock, folk punk
- Occupations: Musician, painter
- Instruments: Bass guitar, guitar, mandolin vocals
- Years active: 1990s–present
- Labels: Epitaph, ANTI-, Zunior
- Website: www.gregsmithsounds.com

Greg Smith is a Canadian musician and painter based in Toronto, Ontario. He is best known as the bassist of indie rock band The Weakerthans, which he joined in August 2004, replacing founding bassist John P. Sutton. As a member of The Weakerthans, he contributed to their latest studio album, Reunion Tour, and is featured on their live release Live at the Burton Cummings Theatre, to which he also contributed the album cover. Since 2018, Greg has been the bassist for the indie rock band The Lowest of the Low.

== Music ==
Smith has released three solo albums as Greg Smith Sounds: Hot as a Lemon (2003), The Northern Elation (2009), and Songs About Love (2022).

Aside from his work with The Weakerthans and as Greg Smith Sounds, Smith plays electric guitar in the bands The Bad Dreamers, The Tres Bien Ensemble (which he also contributes vocals for) and The Keep On Keepin Ons. He has also played bass for:

- The Michael Parks
- Martin Tielli (formerly of The Rheostatics)
- Instant Klazzix (with Martin Tielli)
- The Two-Minute Miracles
- Wil
- The Righteouser Brothers
- The Co-operators
- Oxford County Circus
- Orbital Action
- John K Samson, Winter Wheat and touring band.
- Jim Bryson (with other members of The Weakerthans)
- Christine Fellows (with John K. Samson and Jason Tait)
- Greg Graffin (with Stephen Carroll and Jason Tait)
- The FemBots (with Jason Tait)
- Lowest Of The Low

== Art ==
Smith's paintings were featured as cover art on The Weakerthans' Live at the Burton Cummings Theatre and Ford Pier's Organ Farming.

== Other work ==
Smith appeared in the independent film Goldirocks (2003) which also featured songs from his projects The Keep On Keepin' Ons and The Co-operators.

== See also ==
- John K. Samson
- Jason Tait
- Stephen Carroll
