= Reggie Leach =

Canadian ice hockey player (born 1950)

CM OM Reggie Leach
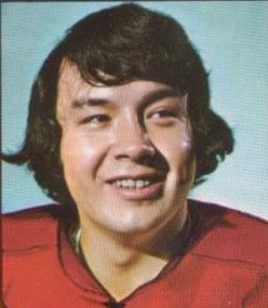
- Leach with the Philadelphia Flyers in 1974
- Born: April 23, 1950 (age 76) Riverton, Manitoba, Canada
- Height: 6 ft 0 in (183 cm)
- Weight: 180 lb (82 kg; 12 st 12 lb)
- Position: Right wing
- Shot: Right
- Played for: Boston Bruins; California Golden Seals; Philadelphia Flyers; Detroit Red Wings
- National team: Canada
- NHL draft: 3rd overall, 1970; Boston Bruins
- Playing career: 1970–1984

Reginald Joseph Leach CM OM (born April 23, 1950) is a Canadian former professional ice hockey right winger who played 13 seasons in the National Hockey League (NHL) for the Boston Bruins, California Golden Seals, Philadelphia Flyers, and Detroit Red Wings between 1970 and 1983. He is best known for his time in Philadelphia, winning a Stanley Cup with the Flyers in 1975 and being a member of the LCB line.

== Playing career ==
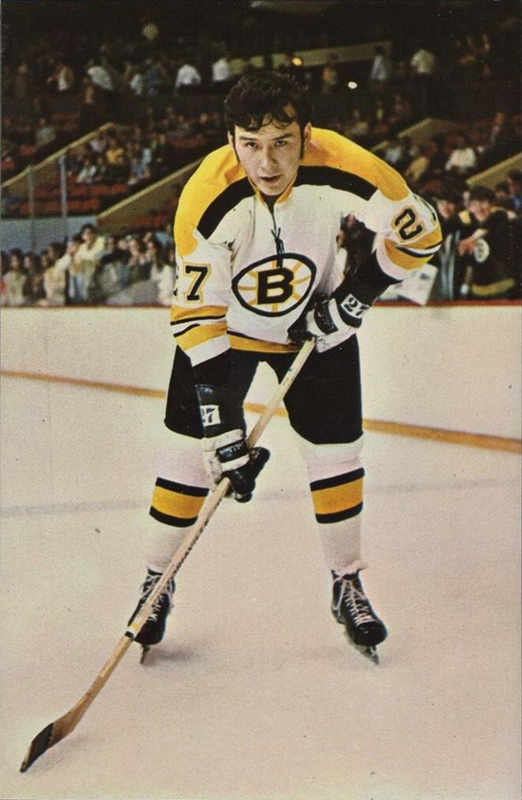
Leach with the Boston Bruins in 1970

Nicknamed "The Riverton Rifle" and "The Chief", Leach was drafted third overall by the Boston Bruins in the 1970 NHL Amateur Draft. Leach scored his first NHL goal in Boston's 6-0 home win over St. Louis on January 31, 1971. He scored nine goals during his time with the Bruins.

Boston traded Leach, Rick Smith and Bob Stewart to California for Carol Vadnais and Don O'Donoghue on February 23, 1972. After playing three seasons in Oakland, the Golden Seals traded Leach to Philadelphia for Larry Wright, Al MacAdam and 1974 first rounder (Ron Chipperfield) on May 24, 1974. He contributed to the Philadelphia Flyers' Stanley Cup win in 1974-75. Leach finished his NHL career with a one-season stop with the Detroit Red Wings.

Leach's best season was the 1975–76 season with the Philadelphia Flyers, when he set career highs in goals (61), points (91), game-winning goals (11), and plus-minus with a +73 rating. Leach's 61 goals earned him the goal-scoring title for that season, as well as the current Flyers franchise record for most goals in a season.

Leach is perhaps best remembered for being one of only six players, the first Flyer, and the first non-goaltender to win the Conn Smythe Trophy, awarded to the MVP of the Stanley Cup playoffs, as a member of the losing team in the Final. He followed Roger Crozier (Detroit Red Wings, in 1966) and Glenn Hall (St. Louis Blues, 1968) and preceded Ron Hextall (Philadelphia, 1987), Jean-Sebastien Giguere (Mighty Ducks of Anaheim, 2003), and Connor McDavid (Edmonton, 2024). He earned this distinction in 1976 while setting NHL records for most goals in a single post-season, with 19 in 16 games, surpassing the Montreal Canadiens' Newsy Lalonde's 1919 mark of 17 goals, and longest consecutive games goal-scoring streak in the playoffs at 10, bettering the seven set by another Canadien, Maurice Richard, as his team went on to be swept in the final by Montreal. The latter record remains unrivaled, but the former was matched by the Edmonton Oilers' Jari Kurri in 1985, although Leach established it in two fewer games. During that same playoff season, Leach recorded a five-goal game against the Boston Bruins, a record he shares today with Maurice Richard, Darryl Sittler, Mario Lemieux and Newsy Lalonde. Also, his total of 80 goals for the season and playoffs together set a new NHL record, which stood until 1980-81 when Mike Bossy of the New York Islanders scored 85.

Leach played 934 career NHL games, scoring 381 goals and 285 assists for 666 points. Reggie was also part of the Flyers' 35-game unbeaten streak in 1980, which is a record that still stands today, in addition to the Flyers' home game unbeaten streak of 22 games in the same year. Leach also played for Team Canada in the 1976 Canada Cup, helping to win the championship. He was also a member of the NHL All-Star teams in 1976 and 1980.

== Coaching career ==
In late 2007, Leach joined the Manitoulin Islanders of the Northern Ontario Junior Hockey League as an associate coach. In the spring of 2008, it was announced that Leach would return to Manitoulin for the 2008–09 season as the full-time head coach and director of hockey operations.

== Personal life ==
Leach is of Ojibwe ethnicity, a member of Berens River First Nation in Manitoba. His son Jamie Leach played in the NHL for parts of five seasons, winning the Stanley Cup with the Pittsburgh Penguins in 1992. Reggie and his two children have all represented Canada: Leach with Team Canada in 1976; son Jamie in the World Juniors in 1989; and daughter Brandie in the world Lacrosse championships in Scotland in 1993.

In 1985, Leach entered rehab for alcohol abuse. He has remained sober for over 30 years.

== Career statistics ==
=== Regular season and playoffs ===
Bold italics indicate NHL record

			Regular season					Playoffs
Season	Team	League	GP	G	A	Pts	PIM	GP	G	A	Pts	PIM
1966–67	Flin Flon Bombers	MJHL	45	67	46	113	118	14	18	12	30	15
1966–67	Flin Flon Bombers	M-Cup	—	—	—	—	—	6	6	1	7	11
1967–68	Flin Flon Bombers	WCHL	59	87	44	131	208	15	12	3	15	48
1968–69	Flin Flon Bombers	WCHL	22	36	10	46	49	18	13	8	21	0
1969–70	Flin Flon Bombers	WCHL	57	65	46	111	168	17	16	11	27	50
1970–71	Boston Bruins	NHL	23	2	4	6	0	3	0	0	0	0
1970–71	Oklahoma City Blazers	CHL	41	24	18	42	32	—	—	—	—	—
1971–72	Boston Bruins	NHL	56	7	13	20	12	—	—	—	—	—
1971–72	California Golden Seals	NHL	17	6	7	13	7	—	—	—	—	—
1972–73	California Golden Seals	NHL	76	23	12	35	45	—	—	—	—	—
1973–74	California Golden Seals	NHL	78	22	24	46	34	—	—	—	—	—
1974–75	Philadelphia Flyers	NHL	80	45	33	78	63	17	8	2	10	6
1975–76	Philadelphia Flyers	NHL	80	61	30	91	41	16	19	5	24	8
1976–77	Philadelphia Flyers	NHL	77	32	14	46	23	10	4	5	9	0
1977–78	Philadelphia Flyers	NHL	72	24	28	52	24	12	2	2	4	8
1978–79	Philadelphia Flyers	NHL	76	34	20	54	20	8	5	1	6	0
1979–80	Philadelphia Flyers	NHL	76	50	26	76	28	19	9	7	16	6
1980–81	Philadelphia Flyers	NHL	79	34	36	70	59	9	0	0	0	2
1981–82	Philadelphia Flyers	NHL	66	26	21	47	18	—	—	—	—	—
1982–83	Detroit Red Wings	NHL	78	15	17	32	13	—	—	—	—	—
1983–84	Montana Magic	CHL	76	21	29	50	34	—	—	—	—	—
NHL totals			934	381	285	666	387	94	47	22	69	22

=== International ===
Year	Team	Event	GP	G	A	Pts	PIM
1976	Canada	CC	6	1	1	2	4
Senior totals			6	1	1	2	4

== Awards ==
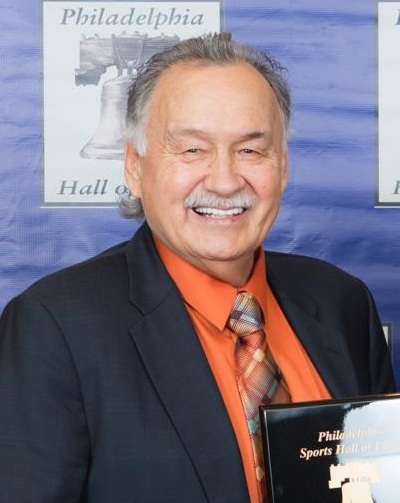
Leach in November 2018

- MJHL First All-Star Team (1967)
- Turnbull Cup MJHL Championship (1967)
- WCJHL First All-Star Team (1968)
- WCHL All-Star Team (1969 and 1970)
- WCHL Goal Scoring Leader (1968 and 1970)
- WCHL Scoring Champion (1970)
- WCHL Player of the Year (1970)
- Stanley Cup championship (1975)
- NHL Goal Scoring Leader (1976)
- NHL Second All-Star Team (1976)
- Conn Smythe Trophy (1976)
- Canada Cup championship (1976)
- Played in NHL All-Star Game (1976 and 1980)
- Inducted into the Manitoba Sports Hall of Fame and Museum in 1997
- Selected to Manitoba's All-Century Second All-Star Team
- Honoured Member of the Manitoba Hockey Hall of Fame
- Inducted into Philadelphia Flyers Hall of Fame (1992)
- Selected as the National Aboriginal Achievement Awards, now the Indspire Awards, recipient in the sports category (2008)
- Member of the Order of Manitoba (2016)
- Member of the Order of Canada (2019)
- Honorary degree Doctor of Laws, Brock University (2019)

== Popular culture ==
John K. Samson wrote and recorded a song about Leach, which was titled "Petition" on his 2010 EP Provincial Road 222 and retitled "www.ipetitions.com/petition/rivertonrifle/" on his 2012 album Provincial. The song recites the text of Samson's own petition to have Leach inducted into the Hockey Hall of Fame, and was formally presented to the HHOF in 2013.

Leach was the answer to a radio question in the TV series It's Always Sunny in Philadelphia. In the fourth episode of the show's sixth season, Mac wins a radio prize after guessing Leach's name at the last second to the question, "Who holds the Philadelphia Flyers' franchise record for goals in a season?"

Leach is cited as inspirational example in Richard Wagamese's novel Indian Horse (2012) and the 2017 film adaptation directed by Stephen Campanelli.

Preceded by Ivan Boldirev	Boston Bruins first-round draft pick 1970	Succeeded by Rick MacLeish
Preceded by Bernie Parent	Winner of the Conn Smythe Trophy; 1976	Succeeded by Guy Lafleur
Preceded by Phil Esposito	NHL Goal Leader; 1976	Succeeded by Steve Shutt
