= Reunion Tour (album) =

Studio album by The Weakerthans
- Released: September 25, 2007
- Recorded: March 2007
- Genre: Indie rock
- Length: 37:06
- Label: Epitaph, ANTI-
- Producer: Ian Blurton

The Weakerthans chronology
Reconstruction Site (2003)	Reunion Tour (2007)	Live Session EP (2009)

Professional ratings
Review scores
Source	Rating
Allmusic	link
CHARTattack	link
Filter	86% link
Now Magazine	link
Stylus	B+ link
This Is Fake DIY	link

Reunion Tour is the fourth studio album by The Weakerthans, released on September 25, 2007, in Canada and the U.S. The album was released on both compact disc and vinyl record.

The album was produced by Ian Blurton, who previously produced Left and Leaving and Reconstruction Site for the band. Blurton has described the album as the band's most experimental to date, and guitarist Stephen Carroll told Uptown that the album features "lots of ambient stuff, tape loops, and some more keyboard than before".

Prior to the album's release, the band released mock "webisodes" about the making of the record on the Epitaph Records website.

== Chart performance ==
The album debuted at #22 on the Canadian Albums Chart, and at #4 on the alternative/modern rock chart.

== Awards and nominations ==
The album was nominated for the 2008 Polaris Music Prize.

== Track listing ==
1. "Civil Twilight" – 3:17
2. "Hymn of the Medical Oddity" – 3:08
3. "Relative Surplus Value" – 2:37
4. "Tournament of Hearts" – 3:34
5. "Virtute the Cat Explains Her Departure" – 4:08
6. "Elegy for Gump Worsley" – 2:43
7. "Sun in an Empty Room" – 4:00
8. "Night Windows" – 4:35
9. "Bigfoot!" – 2:23
10. "Reunion Tour" – 2:07
11. "Utilities" – 4:34

== Song notes ==
"Civil Twilight"

- The song is written from the perspective of a Winnipeg Transit bus driver.
- "My Confusion Corner commuters are cursing the cold away..." Confusion Corner refers to the intersection of Osborne Street, Corydon Avenue, Donald Street, and Pembina Highway in Winnipeg, which is infamous for being difficult to navigate correctly.

"Hymn of the Medical Oddity"

- The song is about David Reimer, a Winnipeg man who became a "queer experiment" when, after a botched childhood circumcision destroyed his penis, his parents were convinced by psychologist John Money to raise him as a girl and allow Money to study "her" as a test case in social construction theories of gender. Reimer committed suicide in 2004.
- "...and ask St. Boniface and St. Vital / Preserve me from my past..." Two jurisdictions of Winnipeg are named after these saints, owing to the city's heavy French history.

"Relative Surplus Value"

- Surplus value is a Marxist term for the profit derived by capitalists from unpaid labour. For example, if an employee is paid $10 an hour but produces $40 worth of goods in that time, his employer has received $30 in surplus value since the worker has not been paid the full value of his output.
- The song is written from the perspective of a man who has just been fired from his job, and is now relating his experience to an unnamed acquaintance. In an early live performance of the song on college radio station KUCI in Irvine, California, Samson described the song as being about the dot-com bust.

"Tournament of Hearts"

- The Scotties Tournament of Hearts is Canada's annual women's curling championship. The song is written from the perspective of a man who spends all his free time at the curling club, partly out of his love of the sport and partly because of communication problems in his marriage: "Why, why can't I draw right up to what I want to say? Why can't I ever stop where I want to stay? I slide right through the day, I'm always throwing hack weight."
- Tournament of Hearts was also the title of the third album by The Constantines, which that band released soon after touring with The Weakerthans in 2003. In an interview with CBC Radio 3 to promote the release of Reunion Tour, Samson claimed that the Constantines chose the album title at his urging.

"Virtute the Cat Explains Her Departure"

- This is the second song the band has written from the point of view of Virtute, a cat. The first was "Plea from a Cat Named Virtute", which appeared on the previous album Reconstruction Site. The word virtute is the ablative of virtus, meaning "virtue," "strength," and "goodness" in Latin, and appears in the civic motto of Winnipeg, Unum cum virtute multorum ("one with the strength of many"). The story of Virtute concluded on Samson's 2016 solo album Winter Wheat, with the songs "Virtute at Rest" detailing Virtute's final thoughts before death and "17th Street Treatment Center" documenting Virtute's owner's stint in a drug rehabilitation program.
- The Art of Time Ensemble featuring (former Barenaked Ladies singer) Steven Page covered "Virtute the Cat Explains Her Departure" on their 2010 record A Singer Must Die.

"Elegy for Gump Worsley"

- Gump Worsley was a Canadian hockey player who died in 2007. He is viewed as a punk sports icon, having also inspired the Huevos Rancheros song "Gump Worsley's Lament" and the title of Sons of Freedom's 1991 album Gump.

"Sun in an Empty Room"

- The song is written from the perspective of a man who is in the process of moving out of an apartment and is looking at an empty room that was once filled with furniture.
- The song takes its name from a painting by American painter Edward Hopper.
- The song is used as the closing theme for the Gimlet Media podcast Heavyweight hosted by Jonathan Goldstein.

"Night Windows"

- The song's title is taken from a painting by Edward Hopper, and is written from the perspective of a man passing the window where a deceased loved one once lived.

"Bigfoot!"

- The song is written from the perspective of Bobby Clarke, a driver on the Nelson Channel ferry near Norway House, Manitoba, who captured a two-and-a-half minute video of an alleged Bigfoot sighting in 2005.

"Reunion Tour"

- The song is written from the point of view of a roadie on tour with his recently reformed band.

"Utilities"

- A different rendition of "Utilities" was previously recorded for the Canadian edition of the 2006 compilation album Help!: A Day in the Life.

== Personnel ==
- Stephen Carroll – guitars, vocals, pedal steel, keyboards
- John K. Samson – vocals, guitars, keyboards
- Greg Smith – bass, vocals, keyboards
- Jason Tait – drums, percussion, vibes, glockenspiel, keyboards, banjo, loops
- Michael Barth – trumpet ("Reunion Tour", "Bigfoot!")
- Tyler Greenleaf – trombone ("Reunion Tour", "Bigfoot!")
- Izabella Budai – flute ("Reunion Tour")
- Sean Dealey – additional snare rolls ("Reunion Tour")
- Julie Penner – trumpet ("Elegy for Gump Worsley")
