= Paper Anniversary (album) =

Studio album by Christine Fellows
- Released: 2005
- Genre: Folk pop
- Label: Six Shooter
- Producer: Christine Fellows

Christine Fellows chronology
The Last One Standing (2002)	Paper Anniversary (2005)	Nevertheless (2007)

Paper Anniversary is the third album by Canadian folk-pop singer Christine Fellows, released in 2005 on Six Shooter Records.

The album was recorded in Fellows' own home, largely on her own but with contributions from her husband John K. Samson, his Weakerthans bandmate Jason Tait, cellist Leanne Zacharias, violist Monica Guenter and multi-instrumentalist Barry Mirochnick.

The album is framed by two songs, "Foreword" and "Afterword", that are written from the perspective of Klaus Burlakow, a Winnipeg city bureaucrat who was arrested for bank robbery in 2003, with Fellows stating that she was "fascinated by the way this guy could live a double life". Fellows explained that she had tried to write from a more fictionalized rather than autobiographical perspective on the album, although she acknowledged that "Vertebrae" was written about visiting her dying grandfather in the hospital, and some lyrical details in the songs were drawn from her personal and professional relationships with Samson and Zacharias. "Instructions on How to Dissect a Ground Owl" was based on a translation of a poem by Julio Cortázar.

== Critical reception ==
Stewart Mason of AllMusic compared the album to the work of Lisa Germano, Aimee Mann and Fiona Apple.

Shawn Conner of the Vancouver Courier praised the album, writing that it is "filled with perfect miniatures as finely wrought and layered as a New Yorker short story, with an inviting first line and an eye for detail," and noted that the album "was made in Winnipeg, and the city's famous winters, its isolation and stillness set the tone for this sublime and affecting work". He concluded that "a perfect record in nearly every respect, Paper Anniversary is easily one of the best albums of the year."

Michael Barclay of the Waterloo Region Record was more dismissive, writing that "while Paper Anniversary boasts lovely arrangements and performances, Fellows' hoser schoolteacher vocals suffer from over-enunciation in search of a melody, even though her lyrics hold up perfectly as poetry on paper," but acknowledged that it would likely appeal to fans of Veda Hille.

Silas Polkinghorne of the Saskatoon Star-Phoenix named the album, alongside Rae Spoon's White Hearse Comes Rolling, Jason Collett's Idols of Exile and Constantines' Tournament of Hearts, as works that had been on his ballot for the 2006 Polaris Music Prize, with Wolf Parade's Apologies to the Queen Mary being the only album on the shortlist that he had voted for.

== Track listing ==
1. "Foreword"
2. "Vertebrae"
3. "Road Trip"
4. "Migrations"
5. "Face Down, Feet First"
6. "Instructions on How to Dissect a Ground Owl"
7. "Paper Anniversary"
8. "Souvenirs"
9. "Double Takes"
10. "We Two"
11. "Phantom Pains"
12. "Departures/Arrivals"
13. "Paper Anniversary (Reprise)"
14. "Afterword"
