= Nevertheless =

Nevertheless may refer to any of the following and more:

- Nevertheless (album), an album by Christine Fellows
- Nevertheless (band), an American Christian indie pop rock band
- "Nevertheless I'm in Love with You", a song written by Harry Ruby
- Nevertheless (TV series), a 2021 South Korean television series
- Nevertheless, a song by Survivor from the album Reach
