= Sixty Stories =

Sixty Stories may refer to:

- Sixty Stories (band), a Canadian indie rock band
- Sixty Stories (book), a collection of short stories by Donald Barthelme
- Sixty Stories (Buzzati short story collection), a Strega Prize-winning collection known as Sessanta racconti in Italian
