= Gods Lake Narrows =

Human settlement in Manitoba, Canada

Coordinates: 54°33′17″N 94°28′35″W

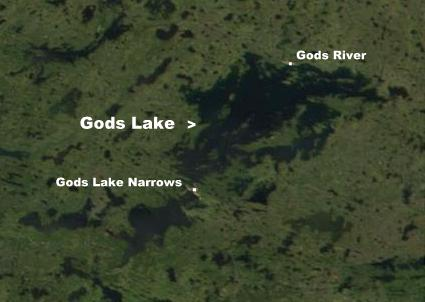
Gods Lake Narrows on Gods Lake

Location of God's Lake Narrows in Manitoba

God's Lake Narrows is a community located in northeastern Manitoba in Canada. The community is located on the shores of Gods Lake, which is the seventh largest lake in the province. God's Lake has a maximum depth of 75 metres.

Located 550 km northeast of Winnipeg, the community is accessible by air, boat, and by winter roads.(see map)

== Demographics ==
In the 2021 Census of Population conducted by Statistics Canada, Gods Lake Narrows had a population of 141 living in 57 of its 69 total private dwellings, a change of 58.4% from its 2016 population of 89. With a land area of 1.62 km^{2} (0.63 sq mi), it had a population density of 87.0/km^{2} (225.4/sq mi) in 2021.

== Website ==
The community is the subject of an interactive documentary, God's Lake Narrows, by artist and filmmaker Kevin Lee Burton, who was born in the community, co-created by NFB producer Alicia Smith. God's Lake Narrows utilizes photos of the community by Scott Benesiinaabandan, a Manitoba-based Anishinabe artist. Benesiinaabandan's photos had originally been displayed in a Winnipeg gallery. Christine Fellows did sound design for the project, which was produced in Winnipeg by the National Film Board of Canada. The website consists of 26 slides which alternate between photographs and text. Viewers can navigate the website by clicking on arrows embedded on each page. In May 2012, God's Lake Narrows received the Webby Award for best use of photography. It was also nominated for individual episode in the online film and video category.

The website project grew out of Burton and Caroline Monnet's installation piece RESERVE(d) which was shown in Winnipeg at the Shaman Urban Gallery in 2010. The installation included sound, film, photography, and archival images of Burton's grandmother. It was designed to create an intimate community that mirrored a "reserve reality." Alicia Smith, a producer at the National Film Board, was one of the guests invited to the installation at the gallery. She worked together with Burton to write and create the online version after her experience.

The website builds Indigenous guest protocol into its structure. It follows the principle of hospitality, the Cree miyo-wîcêhtowin, "the principle of getting along well with others, good relations, expanding the circle," and hospitality, "the act or practice of being hospitable; the reception and entertainment of guests, visitors, or strangers, with liberality and goodwill". The God's Lake Narrows website begins by allowing viewers to see the exterior of the homes; it then invites them inside. However, before viewers are allowed inside of the homes and lives of these Indigenous families, they must learn about their community.
