= Paper Anniversary =

Paper Anniversary may refer to:

- A 1st wedding anniversary is referred to as a Paper Anniversary
- Paper Anniversary (album), an album by Canadian folk-pop singer Christine Fellows
