= Afterword (disambiguation) =

Afterword is a literary device. It may also refer to:

- After Words, a TV series
- Afterwords (The Gathering album)
- Afterwords (Collective Soul album)
- "Afterword", song from Paper Anniversary (album)
