= Record of the Week Club =

2008 collaborative music project that was released as an album in 2009

Compilation album
- Released: 2009
- Recorded: 2008
- Label: Head in the Sand
- Producer: Mike Petkau

The Record of the Week Club was a collaborative music project among musicians in Winnipeg, Manitoba, which took place in 2008. Organized by Mike Petkau of the band Les Jupes, the project brought together a group of musicians each week to write and record a song in 12 hours. Musicians involved in the project were selected by Petkau, but were not informed in advance of who they would be collaborating with.

The project took place over 16 weeks, with a different group of musicians convening each week. Each song was released for sale the next day, at a price of 99 cents per song, to raise funds for the renovation of Winnipeg's West End Cultural Centre.

The 16 songs were also released as a complete album in 2009. For the album's release party, 20 of the musicians involved in the project performed a live concert at the West End Cultural Centre of the entire album, as well as five songs which were newly composed by the same process exclusively for the live show.

The project was most famous for "Keewatin Arctic", a song recorded by singer-songwriter John K. Samson, electronic musician Blunderspublik and Inuk throat singer Nikki Komaksiutiksak in the 13th week of the project.

== Tracks ==
1. "Laying Mortar" — Joe Silva, Ricardo Lopez (Oldfolks Home), Graham Epp (Mahogany Frog)
2. "Step Outside" — Joel Klaverkamp (The Hummers), Dave Quanbury (Twilight Hotel), Andrew Workman (The Haste)
3. "Steamed Chilis" — Jack Jonasson (Novillero), Jonathan Alexiuk, Mike Petkau
4. "Live For Love" — Karla Adolphe (Jacob & Lily), Rusty Matyas (The Waking Eyes), Demetra Penner
5. "Come Forth" — Andrina Turenne (Chic Gamine), Matt Tapscott, Matt Schellenberg (The Liptonians)
6. "Take What You Can" — Sky Onosson (New Meanies), Bucky Driedger (The Liptonians), Jaime Carrasco
7. "Don't Wanna Cross" — Julia Ryckman (The Gorgon, Slattern), Lloyd Peterson, Matt Peters (The Waking Eyes)
8. "Call Me" — Rachel Moody (Winnipeg Symphony Orchestra), Brandy Zdan (Twilight Hotel), DJ Grant Paley (Moses Mayes)
9. "All Answers Pending" — Matt Worobec (Tele), Jaxon Haldane (D. Rangers), Jo Snyder (Anthem Red)
10. "Walkman" — Ismaila Alfa, Mark Penner (Moses Mayes)
11. "Falling" — Keri Latimer (Nathan), Heather Antenbring, Jennifer Thiessen (La La La Human Steps), Chris Bauer (American Flamewhip, The Perpetrators)
12. "Royal Canadian Lovers School" — Jay Churko (Chords of Canada), Ken Gregory, Jesse Warkentin (Mahogany Frog)
13. "Keewatin Arctic" — John K. Samson (The Weakerthans), Blunderspublik, Nikki Komaksiutiksak
14. "Wails On" — Steve Martens (Ash Koley), Bob Somers (Bonaduces), DJ Co-op
15. "Something Is Kind of Amiss" — Ethan Osland (burnthe8track), Ann Walton, Phoebe Man
16. "Waiting for Debates" — Patrick Keenan, Jeff Peters (Les Jupes), Ian La Rue (Les Jupes)
