= Reconstruction Site =

Studio album by the Weakerthans
- Released: August 26, 2003
- Recorded: January – March 2003; Toronto, Ontario, Canada
- Genre: Indie rock
- Length: 40:46
- Label: Epitaph
- Producer: Ian Blurton

The Weakerthans chronology
Left and Leaving (2000)	Reconstruction Site (2003)	Reunion Tour (2007)

Professional ratings
Review scores
Source	Rating
Allmusic	4/5 stars
Sun Media	(favorable)

Reconstruction Site is the third studio album by the Weakerthans, released on August 26, 2003. A song cycle about grief, regret, loss and eventual hope, the album is thematically framed by three tracks, "(Manifest)", "(Hospital Vespers)" and "(Past-Due)", which set three different sonnets following a terminally ill hospital patient into the aftermath of his death to the same melody.

Other songs examine the album's themes from different angles: "Plea from a Cat Named Virtute" is written from the perspective of a depressed person's cat, "One Great City!" is about Samson's love–hate relationship with his hometown of Winnipeg, and "Our Retired Explorer" imagines a dinner date between philosopher Michel Foucault and a hopelessly nostalgic member of Ernest Shackleton's expedition to Antarctica.

Guest musicians on the album include Sarah Harmer and Christine Fellows. The album's cover art was designed by Canadian artist and fellow Winnipegger Marcel Dzama.

The song "One Great City!" serves as the theme song to the Canadian television comedy-drama series Less Than Kind.

In 2013, the album made Ballast's list of top 50 Canadian albums of all time.

== Track listing ==
All songs by the Weakerthans and all lyrics by John K. Samson.

1. "(Manifest)" – 1:45
2. "The Reasons" – 2:50
3. "Reconstruction Site" – 2:45
4. "Psalm for the Elks Lodge Last Call" – 2:45
5. "Plea from a Cat Named Virtute" – 3:49
6. "Our Retired Explorer (Dines with Michel Foucault in Paris, 1961)" – 2:23
7. "Time's Arrow" – 2:53
8. "(Hospital Vespers)" – 1:41
9. "Uncorrected Proofs" – 2:42
10. "A New Name for Everything" – 4:04
11. "One Great City!" – 2:55
12. "Benediction" – 3:28
13. "The Prescience of Dawn" – 4:37
14. "(Past-Due)" – 2:10
