= Little Pictures =

EP by John K. Samson
- Released: Original: 1995; Rerelease: August 29, 2006
- Recorded: Canada, 1993–94
- Genre: Acoustic
- Length: 22:29
- Label: G7 Welcoming Committee

John K. Samson chronology
'Slips and Tangles' (1993)	Little Pictures (1995)	'City Route 85' (2009)

Little Pictures is a solo EP recorded between 1993 and 1994 by John K. Samson, then of Propagandhi. It was released in 1995 as a split album with Painted Thin's Small Acts of Love and Rebellion. It was one of G7 Welcoming Committee's first releases, in a PET film pouch. Samson later left Propagandhi and formed The Weakerthans. All six songs also appeared on his solo demo tape Slips and Tangles.

In 2006, both Little Pictures and Small Acts of Love and Rebellion were rereleased separately by G7 in mp3 format on their website and the iTunes Music Store.

== Track listing ==
1. Maryland Bridge (4:24)
2. Sunday Afternoon (2:49)
3. Sympathetic Smile (3:28)
4. Farewell Faded Memory (4:42)
5. Saint Cecilia (2:50)
6. Little Pictures (4:24)
