= Cold as the Clay =

Studio album by Greg Graffin
- Released: July 10, 2006 (Europe); July 11, 2006 (United States)
- Recorded: 2005–2006
- Genre: Americana, folk, alternative country, old-time music
- Length: 38:06
- Label: ANTI-
- Producer: Brett Gurewitz

Greg Graffin chronology
American Lesion (1997)	Cold as the Clay (2006)	Millport (2017)

Professional ratings
Review scores
Source	Rating
Allmusic	4/5 stars
PopMatters	7/10 stars
RTÉ	3/5 stars

Cold as the Clay is the second solo album by Bad Religion's vocalist Greg Graffin. It was released on July 10, 2006, in Europe, and the following day in the United States. It follows on from Graffin's 1997 release of American Lesion.

Graffin has described the album as "honor[ing] the legacy of American music. [...] Traditional songs that helped form the 18th and 19th century American cultural landscape. The modern songs are inspired by my love of country rock in vein of Gram Parsons, The Band, Neil Young". It was produced by fellow Bad Religion member, Brett Gurewitz ("Mr. Brett"), and features appearances by Jolie Holland, and members of The Weakerthans, in contrast to American Lesion, where Graffin recorded the entire album by himself. A special Vinyl edition was released to celebrate Record Store Day 2017.

== Track listing ==
The Epitaph records website gives the track listing as:

1. "Don't Be Afraid to Run" – 4:12
2. "Omie Wise" – 3:53
3. "Cold as the Clay" – 3:19
4. "Little Sadie" – 2:35
5. "Highway" – 2:34
6. "Rebel's Goodbye" – 3:52
7. "Talk about Suffering" (with Jolie Holland) – 3:36
8. "Willie Moore" – 3:56
9. "California Cotton Fields" (with Jolie Holland) – 2:32
10. "The Watchmaker's Dial" – 2:30
11. "One More Hill" – 3:02

Tracks #1, 3, 5, 6, 10 written by Greg Graffin, tracks #2, 4, 7, 8, 11 are traditional songs with many versions and unknown writers, track #9 by Dallas Frazier & Earl Montgomery.

Another track, Footprints in the Snow, was originally announced as the 12th track of the album, but was removed during production.

== Personnel ==
- Greg Graffin – vocals, acoustic guitar, harmonica, piano
- Jolie Holland – backing vocals
- Brett Gurewitz – backing vocals
- Stephen Carroll – guitar/slide guitar
- Joe Wack – guitar
- Chris Berry – guitar, banjo
- David Bragger – fiddle, banjo, mandolin
- Greg Smith – bass
- Jason Tait – drums
