= The Last One Standing =

Studio album by Christine Fellows
- Released: 2002
- Genre: Folk-pop
- Label: Six Shooter
- Producer: Christine Fellows

Christine Fellows chronology
2 Little Birds (2000)	The Last One Standing (2002)	Paper Anniversary (2005)

The Last One Standing is the second album by Canadian folk-pop singer Christine Fellows, released in 2002 on Six Shooter Records.

Stewart Mason of AllMusic rated the album 3.5 out of 5 stars, praising Fellows’ "clear, elegant voice and plain-spoken lyrics".

== Track listing ==
1. Regrets
2. Roadkill
3. Veda's Waltz
4. Seconds After
5. Lost Overtures
6. 2 for 1 (Part 2)
7. Blueprints
8. Trust
9. A Day in the Road
10. Surgery
11. Bird as Prophet
12. The Last One Standing
13. Surprise!
