= American Lesion =

Studio album by Greg Graffin
- Released: November 7, 1997
- Recorded: February–June 1997
- Genre: Alternative country
- Length: 37:20
- Label: Atlantic
- Producer: Greg Graffin

Greg Graffin chronology
American Lesion (1997)	Cold as the Clay (2006)

American Lesion is the debut solo album by Greg Graffin, the lead singer of American punk rock band Bad Religion. Like the album Into the Unknown, this album is a massive departure for Graffin, whose songs generally revolve around loud guitars and harmonies. American Lesion for the most part features Graffin's voice alone, and each song features acoustic guitar or piano rather than electric guitars. The song "Cease" (track 6 on this album) is a slow piano ballad that is also featured on Bad Religion's album The Gray Race as a fast-paced punk rock song.

The lyrical content can also be seen as a departure for Graffin. In most Bad Religion songs, he deals with subjects such as mass globalisation or world pollution. The songs on American Lesion are much more personal; the songs were apparently written about the breakup of his marriage, making the album poignant.

== Reception ==
Professional ratings
Review scores
Source	Rating
AllMusic	3/5 stars
Alternative Rock	7/10

Author Dave Thompson, in his book Alternative Rock (2000), wrote that Graffin leaves the "angry world of punk for a personal, introspective record filled with acoustic guitars and soft rock songs. Emotional instead of political, but tough going for hidebound headbangers."

== Track listing ==
All songs written and composed by Greg Graffin.

1. "Opinion" – 3:12
2. "Fate's Cruel Hand" – 4:43
3. "Predicament" – 3:11
4. "The Fault Line" – 3:03
5. "When I Fail" – 3:36
6. "Cease" – 4:32
7. "Maybe She Will" – 4:27
8. "The Elements" – 3:47
9. "In the Mirror" – 2:41
10. "Back to Earth" – 4:08
