= The Details =

Canadian musical group

- Origin: Winnipeg, Manitoba, Canada
- Genre: Indie rock
- Years active: 2005–present
- Label: Parliament of Trees
- Members: Jon Plett; Keli Martin; Sean Vidal; Shaun Gibson
- Past members: Matt Janzen
- Website: www.thedetails.ca

The Details are an indie rock band based in Winnipeg, Manitoba, Canada, featuring vocalist and guitarist Jon Plett, bassist Keli Martin, guitarist Sean Vidal and drummer Shaun Gibson. Their current record label is Parliament of Trees.

== History ==
The Details formed in late 2005. Plett and Vidal had previously played together in the band The Home Team; Martin and Gibson had each played with several Winnipeg area bands. After performing around Winnipeg for a year, the band released its debut EP, Marching Sound. The band then embarked on several cross-Canada tours.

In September 2007, the band released their debut full-length titled, Draw a Distance. Draw a Border. The album included appearances by The Weakerthans' Stephen Carroll and Paper Moon's Allison Shevernoha.

The Details recorded a full-length album, Lost Art, in 2010. It contained guest appearances from Rusty Matyas of Imaginary Cities, Jenn Grant and Kinley Dowling of Hey Rosetta!. It was produced by Stephen Carroll and Brandon Reid, mixed by Daryl Smith and mastered by Ryan Morey. The band first released The Original Mark EP, a teaser for Lost Art, which contained a pair of songs from Lost Art, as well as a couple of leftovers from the Draw a Distance. Draw a Border. sessions, and a remixed version of their song Floor Plans. The full album was released in May, 2011.

The Details have appeared in a number of television shows and films, including Degrassi, My Awkward Sexual Adventure, Lipstick Jungle, Being Human, and Zooey & Adam.

== Discography ==
- Marching Sound EP (2006)
- Draw a Distance. Draw a Border. (2007)
- The Original Mark EP (2010)
- Lost Art (2011)

== See also ==
- Music of Canada
- Music of Manitoba
- Canadian rock
- List of Canadian musicians
- List of bands from Canada
