= Pierre Aupilardjuk =

Canadian Inuk artist (born 1965)

- Born: 1965 (age 60–61); Repulse Bay

Pierre Aupilardjuk (born 1965) is a Canadian ceramic artist who lives and works in Kangiqliniq (Rankin Inlet), Nunavut.

== Personal life ==
Pierre Aupilardjuk was born in 1965 in Repulse Bay in Nunavut. He is the son of respected sculptor and elder Mariano Aupilardjuk. He has been involved in the Matchbox Gallery studios since their inception, as a student, assistant manager of the ceramics workshop (until 2001), and teacher.

== Artistic career ==
Sculpture and vessel merge in many of Aupilardjuk's works, where he applies fully three-dimensional figures to the outside of his pots. These sculptural forms are carefully cut in half, scooped hollow, and put back together before they are applied to the exterior of the pot. This gives them a thickness comparable to the pot body itself, so the added pieces may fire in the kiln without cracking or breaking.

Familial relations are a common theme in Aupilardjuk's work. Aupilardjuk's works are evocative and imaginative and seem to remind viewers that we bring our family or relations with us wherever we go. Balance and technical elegance are also evident throughout Aupilardjuk's practice in the sculptural forms of his vessels and the human and animal forms that claim space on their surfaces.

Aupilardjuk is comfortable collaborating with various artists, “In addition to collaborating with artists at the Matchbox Gallery in Kangiqliniq, in 2016 Aupilardjuk travelled to Alberta to attend the Medalta Residency with other artists. Works that came out of this residency and subsequent collaborations have become the focal point of the touring exhibition Earthlings. In an Inuit Art Quarterly feature where he and Shary Boyle talk about their collaboration, he says, “My father told me about the way people should work together, to get along together, and everything will be better. A better life.”

In 2017 Aupilardjuk was awarded the Governor General of Canada's Sovereign's Medal for Volunteers.

== Selected group shows ==
- 2019–2020 – Àbadakone | Continuous Fire | Feu continuel, National Gallery of Canada, Ottawa, ON
- 2017 – Earthlings, Esker Foundation, Calgary, AB
- 2017 – Northern Visions, Gardiner Museum, Toronto, ON
- 2014 – The Matchbox Gallery: A Retrospective, Museum of Inuit Art, Toronto, ON
- 2007–2008 – Made in Kangiqliniq: Ceramics and Sculpture from Rankin Inlet, National Gallery of Canada, Ottawa, ON
- 2003 – Rankin Inlet Ceramics, Winnipeg Art Gallery, Winnipeg, MB
