= City Route 85 =

EP by John K. Samson
- Released: October 30, 2009
- Recorded: 2009
- Genre: Acoustic
- Labels: ANTI-, Epitaph, Grand Hotel van Cleef

John K. Samson chronology
Little Pictures (1995)	City Route 85 (2009)	Provincial Road 222 (2010)

City Route 85 is a solo EP by John K. Samson of The Weakerthans, released October 30, 2009 on Grand Hotel van Cleef in Europe, and November 3, 2009 on ANTI-/Epitaph in North America. Samson's first solo release since the EP Little Pictures in 1995, it was the first in a planned series of three or four-song singles inspired by roads in his home province of Manitoba.

Winnipeg's Route 85 is also known by the street name Portage Avenue.

The tracks were later re-recorded and released, along with those on Provincial Road 222, on Samson's solo album Provincial.

== Track listing ==
1. "Heart of the Continent"
2. "Grace General"
3. "Cruise Night"
