= Alissa York =

Canadian writer

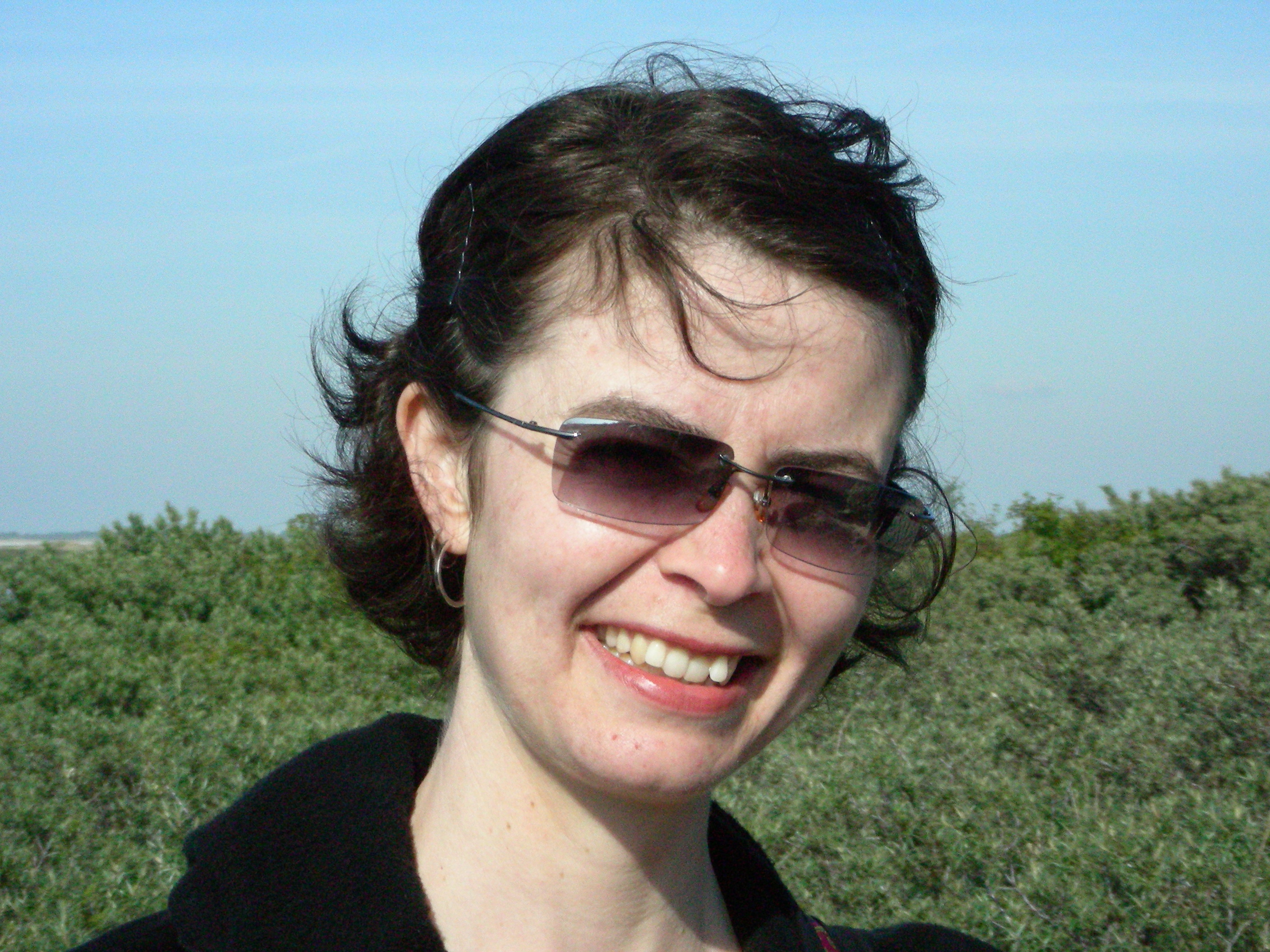
- Born: 1970 (age 55–56); Athabasca, Alberta, Canada
- Occupation: Writer
- Spouse: Clive Holden
- Writing career
- Period: 1990s–present
- Notable work: Effigy
- Website: alissayork.com

Alissa York (born 1970) is a Canadian writer and the 1999 winner of the Bronwen Wallace Memorial Award. She lived in Winnipeg, Manitoba, before settling in Toronto with her writer/filmmaker/publisher husband Clive Holden.

York is best known for her 2007 Random House Canada novel Effigy, which was nominated in 2007 for one of Canada's most important prizes for literature and fiction, the Scotiabank Giller Prize.

== Early life ==
York was born to Australian immigrant parents in Athabasca, Alberta in 1970. Her parents were English teachers and encouraged York in her passion of reading and writing. York's family moved to Victoria in 1977 and after graduating high school, she moved to Montreal where she studied English literature at McGill University. After meeting Clive Holden, the man who eventually became her husband, the couple moved throughout Canada living in Toronto, Whitehorse, Montreal, Victoria and Vancouver. Before publishing her first short story in 1995, York worked various jobs including acting in local theatre productions, waitressing, working at a bookstore and arranging flowers.

== Literature ==
York has written four novels: Mercy, Effigy, Fauna, and The Naturalist, and a book of short stories, Any Given Power, which won the Journey Prize in 1999 for the short story The Back of the Bear's Mouth. York's literature has been translated into many languages including Dutch, Italian and French. Her work was acknowledged internationally when Effigy was nominated for the International IMPAC Dublin Literary Award in 2003.

=== Mercy ===
Mercy captures the separate love affairs two priests become involved in spanning over 50 years in a small town in Manitoba. Butchery becomes a symbol throughout the novel as pain and fear make this unique novel come alive.

=== Effigy ===
Effigy describes the life of a polygamist family in rural Utah. Feminist undertones and Mormon scrutiny sets the tone for this novel, which takes place in the 19th century as men and their wives travel across the United States to tame the wild west. The back story and suffering of each of the four wives in Effigy is explored, but despite the detail and imaginative descriptions throughout the novel, some have argued that Effigy fails to capture an audience's attention and can take some time to get in to. Others have argued Effigy to be "historical fiction at its best".

=== Fauna ===
Fauna captures a different side of Toronto, incorporating nature and humanity and how they intertwine together. York hopes that readers will look differently at nature after examining the detailed description of animals and the surroundings in this book. The Globe and Mail calls Fauna "a rich novel layered with astonishing detail", and in August 2010 it was listed number 3 on the Maclean's Best Sellers list.

== Bibliography ==
- Any Given Power (includes award-winning The Back of the Bear's Mouth) – 1999
- Mercy – 2003
- Effigy – 2007
- Fauna – 2010
- The Naturalist - 2016
