= Small Acts of Love and Rebellion =

Studio album by Painted Thin
- Released: 1995
- Recorded: Canada, 1993–94
- Genre: Punk
- Label: G7 Welcoming Committee

Painted Thin chronology
Small Acts of Love and Rebellion (1995)	Still They Die of Heartbreak (1997)

Small Acts of Love and Rebellion is the debut album by Canadian punk rock band Painted Thin. It was released in 1995 as a split album with John K. Samson's Little Pictures. It was one of G7 Welcoming Committee's first releases, in a PET film pouch. The CD didn't have separate tracks meaning that the listener would have to listen to the whole album without being able to (easily) skip tracks.

In 2006, both Little Pictures and Small Acts of Love and Rebellion were rereleased separately by G7 in mp3 format, on their website and the iTunes Music Store.

== Track listing ==
1. "Legacy of Boxes"
2. "Disposable Song"
3. "Lighthouse"
4. "Breakdown"
5. "Tearing Down My Clubhouse"
6. "Clearly Contrived"
7. "Untitled (From the Windows of Exiles)"
8. "Still Calling"
