= Nevertheless (album) =

Studio album by Christine Fellows
- Released: November 6, 2007
- Genre: Folk pop
- Label: Six Shooter
- Producer: Christine Fellows

Christine Fellows chronology
Paper Anniversary (2005)	Nevertheless (2007)	Femmes de chez nous (2011)

Professional ratings
Review scores
Source	Rating
CHARTattack	2.5/5 stars

Nevertheless is the fourth studio album by Christine Fellows, released on November 6, 2007 on Six Shooter Records. The album was principally inspired by the life and work of poet Marianne Moore; secondary inspirations include artist Joseph Cornell.

Fellows previously composed some songs on the album, including "The Spinster's Almanac", for a dance work by choreographer Susie Burpee.

The album was recorded at the Prairie Recording Co. studio in Winnipeg and the Manitou Opera House in Manitou, Manitoba. Guest musicians include Leanne Zacharias, Cristina Zacharias, Ed Riefel, Barry Mirochnick, Keith McLeod, Cam Loeppky, Greg Smith and John K. Samson.

== Track listing ==
1. Let Us Have Done with the Umbrella of Our Contagion
2. Not Wanted on the Voyage
3. Saturday Night on Utopia Parkway
4. The Spinster's Almanac
5. To a Prize Bird
6. Cruel Jim
7. What Makes the Cherry Red
8. The Parlour Rollers
9. Outcast
10. Poor Robin
11. The Goddess of Macramé
12. Nevertheless
13. A Pantry Ballet
14. Yours, and with Ever Grateful Wonder
15. What Are Years?
