= God's Lake Narrows (film) =

God's Lake Narrows is an interactive visual essay, written and directed by Kevin Lee Burton, co-created with Alicia Smith, sound design by Christine Fellows, and photography by Manitoba-based Anishinabe artist Scott Benesiinaabandan. The visual essay is hosted online by the National Film Board of Canada and was funded in partnership with imagineNATIVE Digital Media Partnership.

God's Lake Narrows began as the RESERVE(d) project by Kevin Lee Burton and Caroline Monnet. RESERVE(d) art installation from the Urban Shaman Gallery in Winnipeg featured film, photography, archival images and sounds from the reserve at God's Lake Narrows.

Burton's intent for God's Lake Narrows was to highlight the resilience of people living on reserves. Burton states. "$3.8 billion has been spent on reserve housing over the last decade and people think we're so privileged: living off the backs of everyone else in this country. In my childhood, most of us were still hauling sewage out in pails."

God’s Lake Narrows is a series of 26 slides that seeks to encourage viewers to experience the virtual reserve community through photographs of the exteriors of homes and portraits of the people who live there. The purpose of the visual essay is to breakdown the stereotypes of Native reserve life.

God's Lake Narrows was the 2012 winner of the Webby Award for photography.
