= Ben Reeves (artist) =

Canadian artist (born 1969)

- Born: 1969 (age 55–56); Vancouver, British Columbia
- Education: BFA, University of British Columbia, Vancouver, BC (1993); MFA, Chelsea College of Art and Design, London, UK (1995)
- Known for: contemporary painter

Ben Reeves (born 1969) is a Canadian contemporary artist whose paintings reflect his experience of the West Coast of Canada. He lives and paints in Tsawwassen, a suburb outside of Vancouver. He works from imagination and memory to depict semi-photographic, impressionistic, often suburban spaces that border on representation and abstraction. His work, he says, is about paying attention to what he sees. What he observes is a source for his art.

== Early life and career ==
Reeves was born in Vancouver, B.C. At the age of 16, he was given a copy of a book on the Group of Seven, Joan Murray's The Best of the Group of Seven, and found the work of Tom Thomson in particular a revelation. He grew up in the Lynn Valley on the north shore of Vancouver. From 1987 to 1989, he attended Simon Fraser University in Vancouver for his first and second year arts and sciences, then switched to the University of British Columbia in Vancouver where he received his BFA in 1993. In 1995, he received his MFA from at the Chelsea College of Art and Design in London, England.

He was a lecturer at the University of British Columbia from 2002 to 2003. From 2006 to 2011, he was an assistant professor and from 2011, an associate professor at the Emily Carr University of Art and Design in Vancouver. From 2023, he has worked as associate dean in the Faculty of Visual Art and Material Practice in the Audain Faculty of Art and on the Faculty of Graduate Studies at Emily Carr University.

== Work ==
Reeves has several bodies of work. He investigates subjects from life or his imagination such as views of the street through rain on a windowpane, a snowstorm through fogged lenses, or sights of a person through puffs of cigarette smoke; as well as the structures of tents, Vancouver city lights seen from a distance, the suburban landscape and seaside beach views. In his writing such as his observations about the colouristic genius of Tom Thomson, he also is sharply perceptive.

Critics speak of the "ongoing material investigation of paint" that marks his practice and of his varied use of paint application.

Reeves is represented by the Equinox Gallery in Vancouver and by the Nicholas Metivier Gallery in Toronto.

== Selected exhibitions ==
- 1993: AMS Gallery, University of British Columbia
- 2003: For the Record: Drawing Contemporary Life, (catalogue essay by curator Daina Augaitis), Vancouver Art Gallery, Vancouver, BC
- 2004: High Points: Canadian Contemporary Art, Ten Years of Acquisitions, Montreal Museum of Fine Arts, Montreal, QC
- 2006: Open Studios, Toronto, ON (two person exhibition with Shary Boyle)
- 2006: Complicated Matter, Museum London, London, ON
- 2013: Goût de la peinture, Galerie de l'UQAM, Virtual Museum of Canada (a virtual survey of recent Canadian painting accompanied by a physical exhibition at Arsenal, Montreal, 2013)
- 2018: Floating among Phantoms, Evergreen Cultural Centre, Coquitlam, BC (catalogue)
- 2020: Valley Nights, Nicholas Metivier Gallery, Toronto.

== Selected public collections ==
- Art Gallery of Ontario, Toronto, ON
- McMichael Canadian Art Collection, Kleinburg, ON
- Montreal Museum of Fine Arts, Montreal, QC
- Museum London, London, ON
- National Gallery of Canada, Ottawa, ON
- Surrey Art Gallery, Surrey, BC
- Vancouver Art Gallery, Vancouver, BC
