= Clive Holden =

Canadian artist and poet

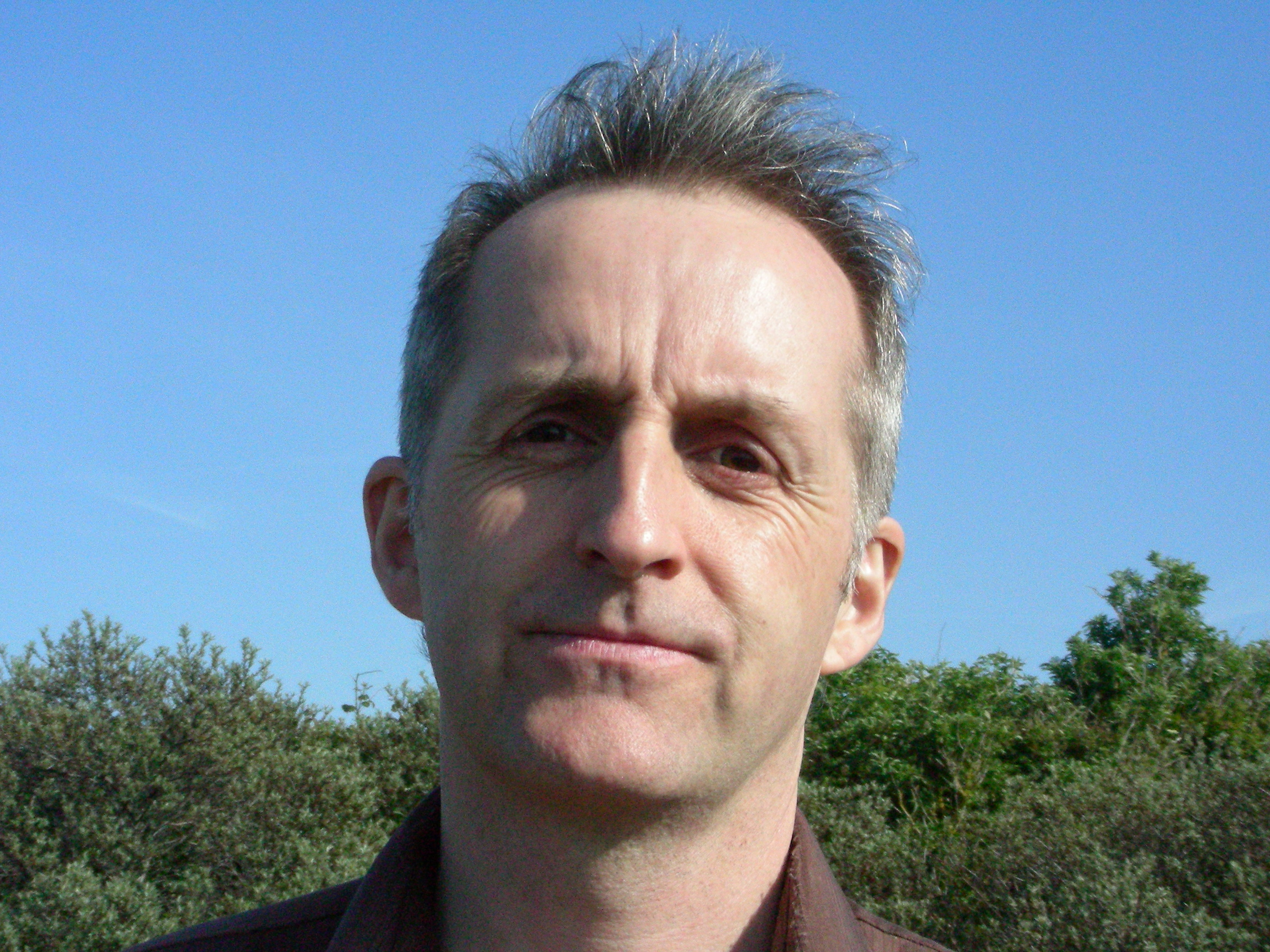
- Occupations: poet, visual artist
- Spouse: Alissa York
- Writing career
- Period: 1990s–present
- Notable works: Trains of Winnipeg, Utopia Suite
- Website: www.cliveholden.com

Clive Holden is a Canadian new media artist, filmmaker and poet from Victoria, British Columbia, he is currently living in Stratford, Ontario with his wife, writer Alissa York.

== Background ==
Holden was born in 1959 on Vancouver Island, and has also lived in Montreal and Winnipeg before settling in Ontario. His earlier publications include Fury — Fictions & Films (Arbeiter Ring Publishing, 1998), a collection combining literary fiction, graphic poetry and flip-book animations made from film stills. For three years he served as the poetry columnist for CBC Radio's Definitely Not the Opera, and he has produced seven spoken-word audio CDs featuring Canadian poets along with a poetry documentary broadcast on CBC Television.

== New Media ==
A 2008 exhibition of Holden's work was announced by the presenting gallery.

In the inaugural exhibition in 2013 of UNAMERICAN UNFAMOUS at the Ryerson Image Centre, Holden worked with archival photographs and snap shots submitted by the public via social media, along with pulsating film leader loops in a large-scale wall composition. The public was asked to nominate their "favourite unfamous unAmericans" for inclusion. The media were composed using a musical analogy so the visuals were listened to rather than viewed. Hundreds of randomization algorithms were also included in the work's code, so that the work's creation wasn't completed until the moment it was viewed, and it could never be viewed the same way twice.

Media, Mediated (2013) is an ongoing series of new media works, net art works, and chromogenic prints. They interrelate in spite of their disparate natures as either ephemeral time-based net art works and installations, or more traditional art objects. Their juxtapositions highlight what they have in common as well as their differences.

== Trains of Winnipeg ==
Holden's best-known and publicized project to date is the award-winning "film poem" series Trains of Winnipeg, a collection of 14 short films featuring Holden's poetry with musical accompaniment by Christine Fellows, John K. Samson, Jason Tait, Steve Bates and Emily Goodden. Trains of Winnipeg screened internationally, a.o. at the IFFR. In it is included the haunting short, 18000 Dead in Gordon Head, in which Holden recalls the shooting of a young girl in that part of Victoria. The 18,000 in the title refers to the average number of murders a television viewer has seen by the time they reach the age of sixteen years.

== Utopia Suite ==
Currently he is working on his project Utopia Suite, launched at the Holland Festival in Amsterdam (2006), investigating into 21st-century views on utopianism. Utopia Suite has since been touring art-galleries through Canada. Recent works, UNAMERICAN UNFAMOUS and Media, Mediated are parts of the Utopia Suite project.
