= The Weakerthans =

Canadian indie rock band

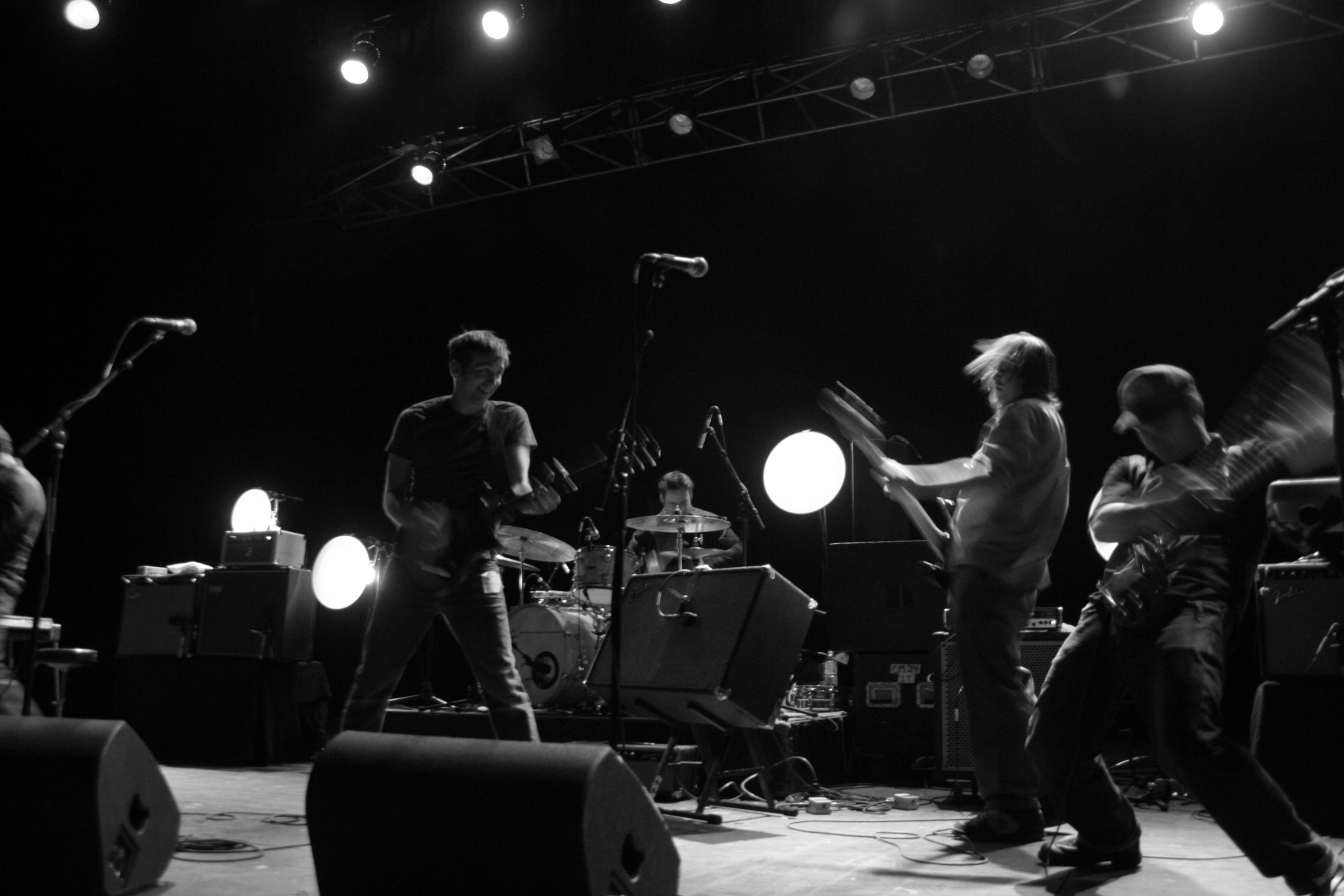
- The Weakerthans performing in Winnipeg, 2007

Background information
- Origin: Winnipeg, Manitoba, Canada
- Genres: Indie rock, folk rock, alternative, post-punk, emo
- Years active: 1997–2014 (on hiatus)
- Labels: Epitaph, ANTI-, G7 Welcoming Committee, Sub City, B.A. Records
- Members: John K. Samson; Jason Tait; Stephen Carroll; Greg Smith
- Past members: John P. Sutton
- Website: The Weakerthans at the Wayback Machine (archived September 30, 2020)

The Weakerthans are a Canadian indie rock band from Winnipeg. The band, led by John K. Samson, has released four studio albums and is currently inactive.

== History ==
The band was formed in 1997 in Winnipeg, Manitoba by John K. Samson, after he left the punk band Propagandhi to start a publishing company. Samson joined bassist John P. Sutton and drummer Jason Tait of Red Fisher, another band from Winnipeg's punk scene, and created The Weakerthans as a vehicle for a more melodic and introspective brand of songwriting than their previous projects.

The origin of the band's name was explained, in 2004 by Samson, as having come from "a few places." One was a line from the 1992 film The Lover: "Go ahead, I'm weaker than you can possibly imagine." Another was a line from Ralph Chaplin's union anthem "Solidarity Forever": "What force on earth is weaker than the feeble strength of one?" The band includes this line in the song "Pamphleteer" from the album Left and Leaving.

The band's debut album, Fallow, was released in 1997 on G7 Welcoming Committee Records, and garnered positive reviews from Canadian music critics. Guitarist Stephen Carroll, formerly of Painted Thin, subsequently joined the band, and Left and Leaving was released in 2000.

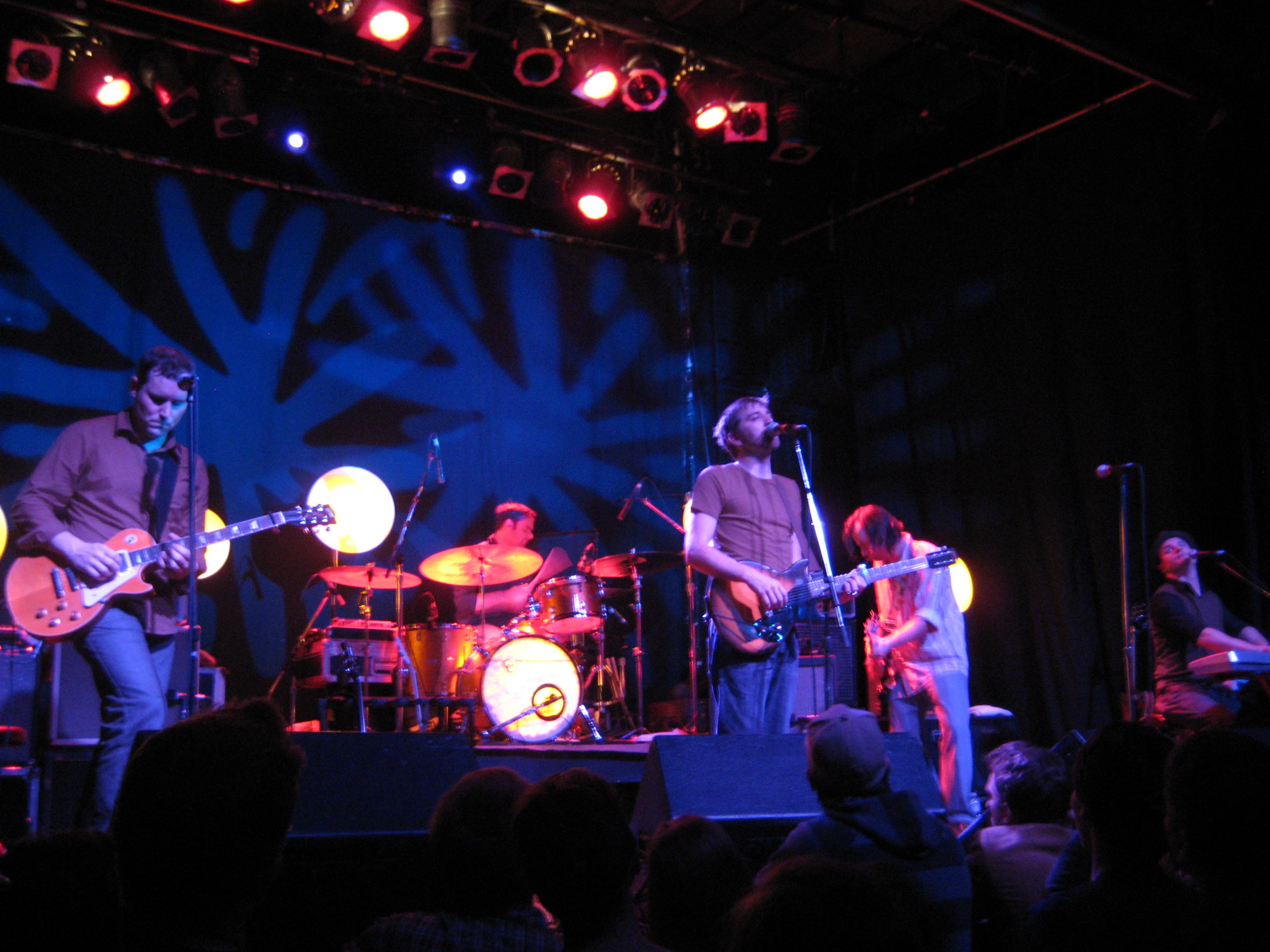
The Weakerthans, with support from Jim Bryson, at a 2007 concert in Toronto

In 2003, the band moved to Epitaph Records and released Reconstruction Site. The album was met with positive reviews from Canadian and international critics for its ambitious combination of punk, rock, folk, country and sonnets. It also became the band's best-selling record to date, and in September appeared on the !earshot National Top 50 Chart as a result of significant airplay on Canadian radio. It was the second Weakerthans album to be produced by Ian Blurton.

Sutton, who played on the band's first three albums, left in August 2004 and was replaced by Greg Smith.

In 2005, Left and Leaving was named one of the ten best Canadian albums of all time in Chart magazine's reader poll. In the same poll, Samson wrote the capsule review for another top ten finisher, The Lowest of the Low's Shakespeare My Butt, which he cited as a major influence on his own music.

Reunion Tour was released on September 25, 2007, in North America by Epitaph and ANTI-. The band released a video for "Civil Twilight", which consisted of a single, unbroken camera shot of the band on a Winnipeg Transit city bus.

Epitaph also re-released the Weakerthans' first two albums, Fallow and Left and Leaving, in Canada on November 6, 2007.

In February 2009, the band participated in Barenaked Ladies' annual Ships and Dip cruise. In a subsequent interview with Canwest News Service, Samson clarified that the band would be taking some downtime over the summer of 2009 before deciding when to start working on their next album. Shortly afterward, Samson announced a series of solo 7" releases about Manitoba roads, which he planned to release over the next 18 months. The first, City Route 85, was released on October 30, 2009, through Epitaph and ANTI-. After a second EP, Provincial Road 222, in 2010, the project instead evolved into Samson's first official solo album, Provincial.

In January 2010, the band announced that they would release a live album, Live at the Burton Cummings Theatre, on March 23. At the same time, they also announced that they were recording material with Jim Bryson for his album The Falcon Lake Incident, which was released on October 19, 2010. In the same year, they were the subject of Caelum Vatnsdal's documentary film We're the Weakerthans, We're from Winnipeg.

In July 2015, media began to report that Tait had announced the band's breakup on Twitter. The band's social media accounts have been updated in accordance to the claims, defining themselves as "cryogenically frozen". Both Tait and Smith collaborated on Samson's 2016 solo album Winter Wheat, which Samson described as feeling in some respects like a new Weakerthans album.

The Gimlet Media podcast Heavyweight, launched in 2016, brought fresh attention to the band by selecting "Sun In An Empty Room" from the album Reunion Tour as the show's theme and closing music.

== Chart performance ==
Reunion Tour debuted at No. 22 on the Nielsen SoundScan chart for Canada in its first week of release, and at No. 4 on the alternative/modern rock chart. The album reached No. 181 on the United States Billboard 200.

The Weakerthans became the first band in the history of CBC Radio 3's R3-30 charts to reach No. 1 with two different songs. The band's cover of Rheostatics' "Bad Time to Be Poor" reached No. 1 the week of June 21, 2007, and "Civil Twilight", the lead single from Reunion Tour, hit the top spot the week of November 15, 2007. As of 2009, "Civil Twilight" remains tied with Arcade Fire's "Black Mirror" as the longest-running No. 1 in that chart's history. "Civil Twilight" was also the No. 1 song in The R3-30's year-end Top 100 chart for 2007.

== Members ==
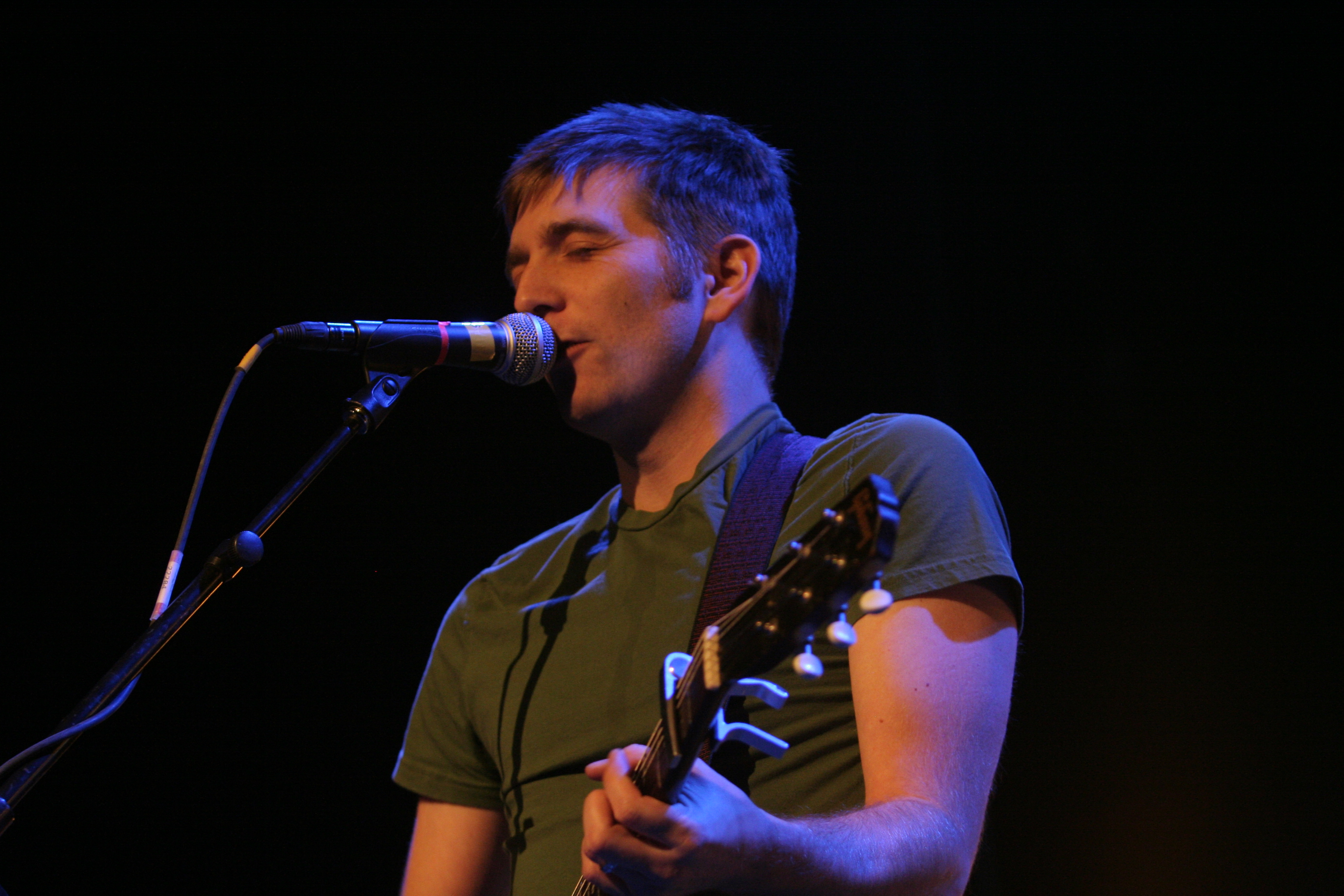
Samson performing in Winnipeg, December 2007

=== Current members ===
- John K. Samson (lead vocals, guitar) (1997–2014)
- Jason Tait (drums, percussion, vibraphone, keyboards) (1997–2014)
- Stephen Carroll (guitar, pedal and lap steel, keyboards) (1997–2014)
- Greg Smith (bass) (2004–2014)

=== Former members ===
- John P. Sutton (bass) (1997–2004)

=== Live show help ===
- Jim Bryson (general support). Joined as of September 10, 2007.
- Christine Fellows (keyboards/background vocals)
- Brian Poirier (acoustic guitar and backing vocals)
- Tyler Greenleaf (trumpet and trombone)
- Rusty Matyas (general support) – performed with the band for the 2009 Rolling Tundra Revue

MacKinnon and Poirier also have their own band, FemBots, and were previously associated with the bands Dig Circus and Hummer. Both Bryson and Fellows are solo artists in addition to touring with The Weakerthans; Fellows and Samson are married. Matyas is a member of the bands The Waking Eyes and Imaginary Cities.

== Discography ==
Studio albums

- Fallow (1997)
- Left and Leaving (2000)
- Reconstruction Site (2003)
- Reunion Tour (2007)

Live albums

- Live at the Burton Cummings Theatre (2010)

With Jim Bryson

- The Falcon Lake Incident (2010)

== Side projects ==
- Samson frequently collaborates with his wife, Christine Fellows.
- Tait has recorded and performed with Broken Social Scene and Do Make Say Think.
- Tait, Samson, and Fellows collaborated with poet and filmmaker Clive Holden on his multimedia project Trains of Winnipeg.
- Carroll appeared on The Details' Draw a Distance. Draw a Border. and The Original Mark EP. He co-produced a couple of songs on The Original Mark EP as well as their upcoming full-length (2011).
- In 2006, all of the Weakerthans except Samson performed on Bad Religion singer Greg Graffin's second solo album, Cold as the Clay. They also toured with Graffin on a tour supporting the album.
- In 2000, the Winnipeg Free Press released a spoken word album by Catherine Hunter that included a bonus track featuring the Weakerthans doing backing instrumentation while Hunter read her poem "Rush Hour".

== Awards ==
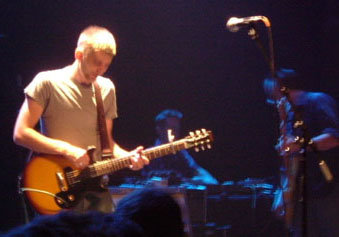
In Montreal, October 2004

=== Won ===
- Outstanding Independent Album – Reconstruction Site – Western Canadian Music Awards (2004)
- Outstanding Songwriter – John K. Samson – Western Canadian Music Awards (2004)
- Artist of the Year – The Weakerthans – Verge Awards (2008).
- SOCAN Songwriting Prize – "Night Windows" (2008)

=== Nominations ===
- Best Alternative Album – Left and Leaving – Juno Awards (2001)
- Video of the Year – "Psalms for the Elks' Lodge Last Call" – Western Canadian Music Awards (2004)
- Alternative Album of the Year – Reconstruction Site – Juno Awards (2004)
- Video of the Year – "The Reasons" – Juno Awards (2005)
- 2008 Polaris Music Prize — Reunion Tour

== See also ==
- Canadian rock
