= Shary Boyle =

Canadian artist (born 1972)

- Born: Shary Boyle; May 26, 1972 (age 54); Toronto, Ontario, Canada
- Education: Ontario College of Art and Design
- Known for: Sculptor, Performance artist
- Movement: Feminist art movement
- Awards: Gershon Iskowitz Prize (2009), Hnatyshyn Foundation Visual Arts Award (2010)
- Website: http://www.sharyboyle.com

Shary Boyle (born May 26, 1972) is a contemporary Canadian visual artist working in the mediums of sculpture using the medium of ceramics, drawing, painting and performance art. She lives and works in Toronto.

== Early life and education ==
Boyle was born in the Toronto suburb of Scarborough, Ontario, the youngest of five children. She attended Wexford Collegiate School for the Arts high school where she studied art and music theatre, then went on to post-secondary studies at the Ontario College of Art, graduating in 1994. She was involved in the Toronto punk and hardcore music scene in her high school and early college years, singing in a band. Her early interest in music and performance incorporated costume, poster and T-shirt design and the creation and free distribution of small photocopied 'zines. Her earliest 'zines and drawings were compiled in the compilation publication "Witness My Shame" (Conundrum Press, 2004). Between 1998–2006 Boyle supplemented her art practice of drawing and painting through published illustration.

In 1998, she began to work with a synthetic polymer clay called Sculpey. Doll maker Vivian Hausle in Seattle in 2002 taught her to understand the medium of porcelain as well as lace draping, a technique for filigrees in lace.

== Art work ==
Shary Boyle works across media and genres, and is known for her representational and narrative symbolism that is personal and at times disturbing. Her work explores themes of gender, identity, sexuality, power and class, evoking emotional and psychic resonance through craftsmanship. She is particularly known for her explorations of the figure through porcelain sculpture. Boyle's earliest porcelain 'figurine' series (2002–2006) used commercial molds and traditional porcelain lace techniques to create sculptures that mined the historical relationship between decoration and excessive ornamentation as it relates to women and gender issues. The series was introduced in a solo exhibition at the Power Plant in Toronto called Lace Figures, curated by Reid Sheir, 2006. Boyle's early experiments with porcelain and her subversion of female hobby-craft from kitsch to contemporary art is credited with reviving porcelain and ceramics as a contemporary art medium in the early 2000s in Toronto, bridging a class divide and questioning the hierarchy between 'low' and 'high' art.

== Selected exhibitions ==
In 2006, she had a 2 person Exhibition with Ben Reeves at Open Studios, Toronto. In 2008, the Southern Alberta Art Gallery in Lethbridge showcased her work in a solo show titled The History of Light, and in 2009 Boyle's work was first exhibited with Kinngait artist Shuvinai Ashoona in the exhibition Noise Ghost at the Justina M. Barnicke Gallery, Art Museum University of Toronto, curated by Nancy Campbell. In 2010, Boyle's first national touring exhibition Flesh and Blood opened at the Art Gallery of Ontario. This exhibition of 28 works — sculpture, installation, paintings, projections - was a joint venture between the Art Gallery of Ontario, Galerie de l’UQAM and the Vancouver Contemporary Art Gallery, and was curated by Louise Déry. Boyle represented Canada at the 2013 Venice Biennale with her project Music for Silence. In the installation was a central component titled The Cave Painter in plaster, of a mermaid, holding a newborn to her breast The Biennial exhibition was accompanied by a catalogue authored by Josée Drouin-Brisebois. In 2014, she participated in Shine a Light: Canadian Biennial 2014.

Participation in the Venice Biennial was a milestone in her career. Since then, she has had many solo and participated in group exhibitions, most notably with other artists, such as her 10-year drawing/text collaboration with video artist Emily Vey Duke called Shary Boyle & Emily Vey Duke: The Illuminations Project at Oakville Galleries. She also has collaborated for a second time with Shuvinai Ashoona, travelling to the Kinngait Studios on Baffin Island, Nunavik, to do so in 2015. The drawings they created together, as well as their independent drawings and sculptures, were presented in a show titled Universal Cobra in 2015 at the private gallery of Pierre-Francois Ouellette Art Contemporain in Montreal in a co-produced exhibition with Feheley Fine Art in Toronto. The publication "Shuvinai Ashoona and Shary Boyle. Universal Cobra" (You’ve Changed Imprints) was released in 2016.

Among other group shows in which she took part, many abroad, are Ceramix: Ceramics and art from Rodin to Schutte, organized by the Bonnefantenmuseum in the Netherlands and travelling to La Maison Rouge in Paris, and Cite de la ceramique in Sevres, France in 2016, and the Gyeonggi International Ceramic Biennale in Seoul, South Korea in 2017. She also proposed, researched and co-organized the show Earthlings, an artist-curated exhibition produced by the Esker Foundation in Calgary in 2017.

In addition to her sculpture and performance work, Boyle performs with musicians, creating shadow vignettes and "live" drawings, which are animated and projected onstage using vintage overhead projectors. In 2006, Boyle was invited to perform at the Hammer Museum in Los Angeles in a show titled A Night with Kramers Ergot, where she presented a live solo performance in costume with a curated soundtrack. Boyle collaborated with Doug Paisley to form an opening act for Will Oldham's 10-date 2006 California tour. She has also worked with Feist in Paris, Peaches in Berlin, and Christine Fellows in Canada. In 2012, she collaborated with the latter to present an original theater piece, Everything Under the Moon at the Enwave Theatre in Toronto. In 2014, Boyle and Fellows collaborated on a new live multi-disciplinary performance called Spell to Bring Lost Creature Home, by invitation of the Northern Arts and Cultural Centre. The pair presented Spell to Bring Lost Creatures Home on a five-date small plane tour of the Northwest Territories in October 2014, and across Canada for 10 dates in 2015. In 2016 Boyle presented her first commissioned stage design for Voix de Ville!, a production of the Niagara Artists Centre at the FirstOntario Performing Arts Centre in St Catharines.

Her commission for the public artwork Cracked Wheat by the Gardiner Museum in Toronto was installed in front of the museum in 2019. In 2021, the Gardiner Museum gave Boyle a solo exhibition Outside the palace of Me, an installation with drawing, ceramic sculpture, mirrors and an interactive score, in which she mined her anxiety about global crises. In 2023, Outside the Palace of Me travelled to the Vancouver Art Gallery.

== Collections ==
Boyle's work is included in many public and private collections, including the National Gallery of Canada, Ottawa, the Montreal Museum of Fine Arts, the Art Gallery of Nova Scotia, Halifax, the Musée d'art contemporain de Montréal, and the Art Gallery of Ontario, Toronto. She worked exclusively with the Toronto contemporary commercial art gallery Jessica Bradley Art + Projects from 2007 until she left to become independent in 2014.

== Residencies ==
Boyle is also a public speaker, with an extensive and broadly-based history. In 2014, Boyle was lead faculty on The Universe and Other Systems residency at The Banff Centre. In 2016, she travelled to Kangiqliniq (Rankin Inlet), Nunavik to meet the ceramic artists working at Matchbox Studios, inviting John Kurok and Pierre Aupilardjuk to join her on a ceramic residency at Medalta Historic Potteries in Medicine Hat, Alberta for 2016.

== Awards and distinctions ==
Boyle has won a number of awards and distinctions.

- Canada Council for the Arts International Studio Program residency at Space in London, UK, in 2007.
- Finalist for the Sobey Art Award in 2007 and 2009.
- Gershon Iskowitz Prize in 2009.
- Hnatyshyn Foundation Visual Arts Award in 2010.
- Represented Canada at the 2013 Venice Biennale.
- Honorary Doctorate from OCAD U in Toronto in 2021.
