= Painted Thin =

Canadian musical group

- Origin: Winnipeg, Manitoba, Canada
- Genre: Hardcore punk
- Years active: 1994–1999
- Label: G7 Welcoming Committee
- Past members: Stephen Carroll; Paul Furgale; James Ash; Jason Tait; Dan McCafferty; Ben Sigurdson; Michael MacKenzie; Doug McLean; Andrew Srichandra

Painted Thin was a Canadian hardcore punk band, formed in Winnipeg, and active from 1993 to 1999. The core of the band consisted of vocalist and guitarist Stephen Carroll and bassist and vocalist Paul Furgale, with a variety of guest musicians, including James Ash, Dan McCafferty, and Jason Tait, on individual recordings.

== History ==
Painted Thin got together in 1993. That year they released a six-song demo tape entitled Losing Games which featured the songs: "20", "Andrew", "Disposable Song", "Clearly Contrived", "Revelations", and "Breakdown". This was followed by Small Acts of Love and Rebellion, a split CD with John K. Samson, in 1995 on G7 Welcoming Committee Records, and the albums Still They Die of Heartbreak in 1997 and Clear, Plausible Stories in 1999 before breaking up.

Carroll and Tait went on to join Samson's band, The Weakerthans, while Furgale started the band Sixty Stories. In 2001, some unreleased Painted Thin material appeared on a split album with Sixty Stories, Different Places to Sit / A Loveless Kiss.

Small Acts was rereleased on G7 Welcoming Committee in 2006.

== Discography ==
- Losing Games (1993) 6-song self-released Demo Tape
- Small Acts of Love and Rebellion (1995), split with John K. Samson, Little Pictures
- Still They Die of Heartbreak EP (1997) 18:01 Endearing Records NDR 08

Track listing:
- "John Wayne's Wettest Dream" – 1:08
- "Piece by Piece" – 2:53
- "For Sarah and Me" – 3:22
- "I Left a Love Note on the Wall in Saskatoon" – 1:55
- "Story You Have Heard Before" (John K. Samson) – 3:15
- "Stepping on Toes" – 2:29
- "Mexico" – 3:01

- Clear, Plausible Stories (1999)
- A Loveless Kiss (2001) — split with Sixty Stories, Different Places to Sit
- Small Acts of Love and Rebellion (rerelease, 2006)
