= Winter Wheat (album) =

Studio album by John K. Samson
- Released: October 21, 2016
- Genres: Folk, indie rock
- Label: Anti-
- Producers: Jason Tait, Christine Fellows

John K. Samson chronology
Provincial (2012)	Winter Wheat (2016)

Professional ratings
Aggregate scores
Source	Rating
Metacritic	85/100
Review scores
Source	Rating
AllMusic	4/5 stars
The A.V. Club	B+
Exclaim!	9/10
The Line of Best Fit	8/10
Now	4/5 stars
PopMatters	8/10
Uncut	8/10

Winter Wheat is the second solo album by John K. Samson, released on October 21, 2016, via Anti-. It is his first album of new material since the Weakerthans went on hiatus in 2015.

The album was produced by Samson's Weakerthans bandmate Jason Tait and Christine Fellows, and also features contributions from his Weakerthans bandmate Greg Smith. In an interview with The A.V. Club, Samson described the album as feeling in some ways like a new Weakerthans album rather than a solo project.

The album was a longlisted nominee for the 2017 Polaris Music Prize.

== Track listing ==
1. "Select All Delete"
2. "Postdoc Blues"
3. "Winter Wheat"
4. "Requests"
5. "Oldest Oak at Brookside"
6. "Capital"
7. "17th Street Treatment Centre"
8. "Vampire Alberta Blues"
9. "Carrie Ends the Call"
10. "Fellow Traveller"
11. "Quiz Night at Looky Lou's"
12. "Alpha Adept"
13. "Prayer for Ruby Elm"
14. "VPW 13 Blues"
15. "Virtute at Rest"
