= Provincial Road 222 =

EP by John K. Samson
- Released: September 21, 2010
- Recorded: 2009
- Genre: Acoustic
- Label: ANTI-

John K. Samson chronology
City Route 85 (2009)	Provincial Road 222 (2010)	Provincial (2012)

Provincial Road 222 is an EP by Canadian musician John K. Samson, released on September 21, 2010. The second in a series of EPs thematically inspired by roads in Samson's home province of Manitoba, the disc is named for Manitoba Provincial Road 222, which links the towns of Gimli and Riverton.

The song "Petition" recites the text of Samson's online petition to induct Reggie Leach, a native of Riverton, into the Hockey Hall of Fame. Samson formally presented the petition to the HHOF in 2013. The song "Stop Error" is set to the music of a chorale by Johann Sebastian Bach. The song "The Last And" is set at Riverton Early Middle School, where a teacher ponders the disintegration of her affair with the principal. In some early live performances, Samson described "The Last And" as having been subconsciously inspired by the relationship between Principal Skinner and Edna Krabappel on The Simpsons.

The tracks were later re-recorded and released, along with those on City Route 85, on Samson's solo album Provincial.

== Track listing ==
No.	Title	Length
1.	"The Last And"	4:13
2.	"Petition"	2:10
3.	"Stop Error"	2:32
