= Sixty Stories (band) =

Canadian three-piece, female-fronted indie rock band

- Origin: Winnipeg, Manitoba, Canada
- Genres: Indie rock
- Years active: 1999–present
- Spinoffs: Anthem Red
- Members: Jo Snyder; Paul Furgale; Sarah Sangster; Andrew Filyk
- Past members: Kelly Martin

Sixty Stories is a Canadian three piece, female-fronted indie rock band from Winnipeg, Manitoba.

== History ==
Sixty Stories formed in 1999. The band's original members included Jo Snyder (guitar, vocals), Kelly Martin (bass), and Paul Furgale (drummer, formerly of Painted Thin). They released a demo and toured Canada in 2000. In 2001 they released a split-CD with the defunct band Painted Thin titled Different Places to Sit / A Loveless Kiss.

Martin left the band in mid-2001. Soon after, Sarah Sangster joined the band on bass. They released the album Anthem Red which appeared on the Canadian National College Radio Charts.

Sixty Stories continued performing and touring in North America and Europe through to 2004. They actively promoted the inclusion of women in rock bands. In 2004 they disbanding following the departure of Furgale.

In 2004, Jo Snyder, Sarah Sangster and Andrew Filyk formed Anthem Red, drawing their name from the title of the Sixty Stories 2002 album. As of November 2006, that band's membership consists of Snyder (guitars vocals), Sangster (bass, vocals), Dustin Karsin (drums), and Andrew Filyk (guitar, vocals). Their album, Dancing on the Dishwasher, was released in October 2006 on The Company With The Golden Arm, DE.

In November 2006, Sixty Stories reunited in preparation for a German tour promoted by the punk label The Company With The Golden Arm. Membership at that time included Sangster, Snyder, Furgale, and Andrew Filyk.

== Discography ==
- Different Places to Sit / A Loveless Kiss (2001)
- Anthem Red (2002)
