= Fallow (The Weakerthans album) =

Studio album by The Weakerthans
- Released: 1997
- Recorded: April–May 1997 at Private Ear Studios, Winnipeg, Manitoba
- Genre: Indie rock, post-punk
- Length: 36:54
- Label: G7 Welcoming Committee Records
- Producer: Ian Blurton and The Weakerthans

The Weakerthans chronology
Fallow (1997)	Left and Leaving (2000)

Professional ratings
Review scores
Source	Rating
Allmusic	4/5 stars

Fallow is the debut studio album by The Weakerthans.

It was released in 1997 on G7 Welcoming Committee Records in Canada, and in 1999 on Sub City Records in the United States.

The songs "Letter of Resignation" and "Anchorless" were originally written for Propagandhi, the band which John K. Samson left to form the Weakerthans. "Letter of Resignation" appeared on the Propagandhi/F.Y.P. split 7-inch and "Anchorless" on the album Less Talk, More Rock.

Epitaph Records, the band's current label, rereleased Fallow (along with Left and Leaving) in Canada on November 6, 2007.

== Track listing ==
All songs written by John K. Samson, John P. Sutton, and Jason Tait, except where noted.

1. "Illustrated Bible Stories for Children" – 1:43
2. "Diagnosis" – 2:40
3. "Confessions of a Futon-Revolutionist" – 2:15
4. "None of the Above" – 4:18
5. "Letter of Resignation" – 3:23
6. "Leash" – 3:07
7. "Wellington's Wednesdays" – 3:01
8. "The Last Last One" – 3:09
9. "Greatest Hits Collection" – 3:03
10. "Sounds Familiar" – 2:29
11. "Anchorless" (John K. Samson, Chris Hannah, Jord Samolesky) – 3:51
12. "Fallow" – 5:27
