= Live at the Burton Cummings Theatre =

Live album by the Weakerthans
- Released: March 23, 2010
- Recorded: April 2009
- Genre: Indie rock
- Label: Anti-

The Weakerthans chronology
Live Session EP (2009)	Live at the Burton Cummings Theatre (2010)

Live at the Burton Cummings Theatre is a live album and concert DVD by Canadian indie rock band the Weakerthans. The album was recorded during April 2009 at the Burton Cummings Theatre in the band's home town of Winnipeg, as they toured in support of their album Reunion Tour. It was released March 23, 2010 on Anti-.

== Track listing ==
1. Everything Must Go
2. Tournament of Hearts
3. Our Retired Explorer (Dines with Michel Foucault in Paris in 1969)
4. Night Windows
5. Reconstruction Site
6. Aside
7. Civil Twilight
8. Bigfoot
9. Plea from a Cat Named Virtute
10. The Reasons
11. Sun in an Empty Room
12. Left and Leaving
13. Wellington's Wednesdays
14. Benediction
15. Manifest
16. One Great City!
17. This Is a Fire Door Never Leave Open
18. Virtute the Cat Explains Her Departure

Professional ratings
Review scores
Source	Rating
CHARTattack	3.5/5 stars
Now Magazine	3/5 stars
