= Provincial (album) =

Studio album by John K. Samson
- Released: January 24, 2012
- Recorded: 2011
- Genres: Folk, Indie
- Label: ANTI-
- Producer: Paul Aucoin

John K. Samson chronology
Provincial Road 222 (2010)	Provincial (2012)	Winter Wheat (2016)

Professional ratings
Review scores
Source	Rating
AllMusic	4/5 stars
The A.V. Club	B−
Paste	8.7/10
Toronto Star	3/4 stars

Provincial is the debut solo album by John K. Samson, released January 24, 2012 on ANTI-. The album includes re-recorded versions of the six songs from Samson's earlier EPs City Route 85 and Provincial Road 222, as well as six songs not heard on those EPs.

The album was named as a longlisted nominee for the 2012 Polaris Music Prize on June 14, 2012.

== Track listing ==
1. "Highway 1 East"
2. "Heart of the Continent"
3. "Cruise Night"
4. "Grace General"
5. "When I Write My Master’s Thesis"
6. "Letter in Icelandic from the Ninette San"
7. "Longitudinal Centre"
8. "www.ipetitions.com/petition/rivertonrifle"
9. "The Last And"
10. "Stop Error"
11. "Highway 1 West"
12. "Taps Reversed"
