= Stephen Carroll (musician) =

Canadian rock guitarist

- Genres: Indie rock, punk rock
- Instrument: Guitar

Stephen Carroll is a Canadian rock guitarist, and a member of the indie rock band The Weakerthans. Originally a member of the punk rock band Painted Thin, he appeared as a guest musician on the first Weakerthans album, Fallow, and became a permanent member after Painted Thin broke up.

He also appeared as a guest musician on Greg Graffin's solo album Cold as the Clay, along with bandmates Jason Tait and Greg Smith.

Alongside Brandon Reid (The National), Carroll co-produced The Details' full-length album Lost Art, a pair of songs on The Details' The Original Mark EP, which he also plays on. He was also featured on their 2007 release, Draw a Distance. Draw a Border.
