= Left and Leaving =

Studio album by The Weakerthans
- Released: July 25, 2000
- Recorded: February–April 2000
- Genre: Indie rock
- Length: 51:46
- Label: G7 Welcoming Committee
- Producer: Ian Blurton

The Weakerthans chronology
Fallow (1997)	Left and Leaving (2000)	Reconstruction Site (2003)

Singles from Left and Leaving
- 1. "Watermark" Released: January 31, 2001

Professional ratings
Review scores
Source	Rating
AllMusic	4/5 stars
Robert Christgau	(choice cut)
Pitchfork	(6.1/10)
PopMatters	(very favorable)
Punknews.org	5/5 stars

Left and Leaving is the second studio album by The Weakerthans, released July 25, 2000, on G7 Welcoming Committee Records.

In Chart magazine's 2005 poll of the Top 50 Canadian albums of all time, Left and Leaving ranked in sixth place. It was also nominated for Alternative Album of the Year at the 2001 Juno Awards.

"Aside" is on the soundtrack of the film Wedding Crashers. A punked-up alternate version of "My Favourite Chords", retitled "My Favourite Power Chords", appears on G7 Welcoming Committee's 2005 promotional compilation Take Penacilin Now.

Epitaph Records, the band's current label, rereleased Left and Leaving (along with Fallow) in 2007.

== Track listing ==
All lyrics are written by John K. Samson; all music is composed by John K. Samson, Jason Tait, John P. Sutton, Stephen Carroll

No.	Title	Length
1.	"Everything Must Go!"	4:35
2.	"Aside"	3:21
3.	"Watermark"	2:38
4.	"Pamphleteer"	5:16
5.	"This Is a Fire Door, Never Leave Open"	5:07
6.	"Without Mythologies"	3:12
7.	"Left and Leaving"	4:45
8.	"Elegy for Elsabet"	6:20
9.	"History to the Defeated"	3:55
10.	"Exiles Among You"	5:11
11.	"My Favourite Chords"	4:27
12.	"Slips and Tangles"	3:00
