= Christine Fellows =

Canadian singer-songwriter

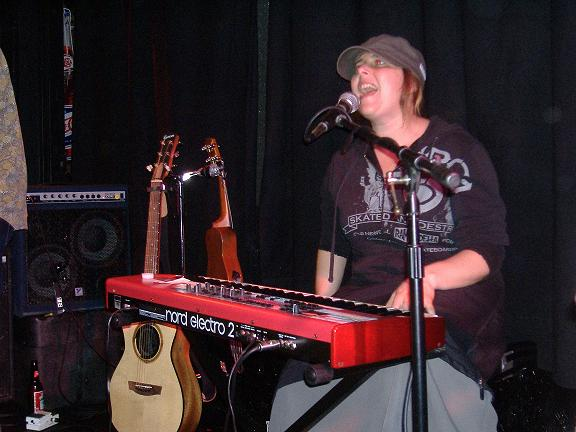
- Fellows in 2008

Background information
- Born: 1968 (age 57–58); Windsor, Ontario, Canada
- Genres: Folk rock
- Occupations: Musician, songwriter
- Instruments: Vocals, keyboards
- Years active: 1993–present
- Label: Six Shooter
- Website: christinefellows.com

Christine Ann Fellows (born 1968) is a Canadian folk-pop singer-songwriter from Winnipeg, Manitoba.

== History ==
Born in Windsor, Ontario, and raised in France and Kelowna, British Columbia, Fellows lived in Toronto, Vancouver, Guelph and Montreal before settling in Winnipeg in 1992.

In 1993, she formed her first group, Helen, with Barry Mirochnick, Paul James, and Chang. Helen broke up in 1995, and in 1996 Fellows teamed up with singer-songwriter Keri McTighe, Barry Mirochnick, Keith McLeod and Peggy Messing, to form Special Fancy. The group released one album, King Me.

In 2000 Fellows released her debut solo album, 2 Little Birds. This was followed by The Last One Standing in 2002, Paper Anniversary in 2005, and Nevertheless in 2007. These albums feature Leanne Zacharias (cello), Jason Tait (drums, vibraphone), Barry Mirochnick (drums, vocals), John K. Samson (vocals, guitar), Keith McLeod (mandolin), Monica Guenter (viola), Greg Smith (bass), Ed Reifel (percussion), and Cristina Zacharias (violin).

Fellows has performed with the Rheostatics, Veda Hille, The Mountain Goats, Kim Barlow, Martin Tielli, Old Man Luedecke and The Weakerthans. She is married to The Weakerthans' lead singer, John K. Samson.

In 2006, Fellows and Samson recorded The Old House, an album intended only as a Christmas gift for friends and family, although they released two songs, "Taps Reversed" and "Good Salvage", for airplay on CBC Radio 3 in early 2007. Fellows and Samson also performed live on the network on 17 March 2007, to mark the final night of the network's terrestrial simulcast on CBC Radio 2.

Fellows also composes music for dance, film, and television. She scored part of Clive Holden's Trains of Winnipeg film series, as well as collaborating with Tait and Samson on the associated album. In 2007, she wrote several songs for a dance piece by choreographer Susie Burpee; they were later included on her fourth solo album, Nevertheless, which was released on 6 November 2007.

Fellows has also toured as a member of The Pan-Canadian New Folk Ensemble with Kim Barlow and Old Man Luedecke, and often collaborates with visual artist Shary Boyle.

She was artist-in-residence at Le Musée de Saint-Boniface Museum in Winnipeg for 2009. Her fifth studio album, Femmes de chez nous includes a live performance film/DVD of the September 2009 premiere of Reliquary/Reliquaire, the commissioned performance work she created for the museum.

In 2011, Samson, Fellows and Sandro Perri participated in the National Parks Project, working with filmmaker Daniel Cockburn to produce and score a short film about Ontario's Bruce Peninsula National Park. She also was the sound designer for the National Film Board of Canada web documentary God's Lake Narrows.

Her 2014 album Burning Daylight was released jointly with a poetry collection of the same name.

She is currently an adjunct professor in the University of British Columbia's creative writing program.

Most recently, Samson, Fellows, Ashley Au and Jason Tait collaborated on the music for For the Turnstiles, a dance performance by Winnipeg's Contemporary Dancers troupe inspired by Neil Young's 1974 album On the Beach. In 2016, Fellows and Tait coproduced Samson's new solo album Winter Wheat.

In 2018, Fellows launched her own online store, Vivat Virtute, to sell her music and other craft and art projects. Her first release through Vivat Virtute was the album Roses on the Vine, and she followed up in 2022 with Stuff We All Get. In February 2023, Fellows and Samson released Hold Music, an album of almost entirely instrumental music except one song with vocals by Samson, with Vivat Virtute credited as the band name.

== Discography ==
- 2000 - 2 Little Birds (Endearing Records)
- 2002 - The Last One Standing (Six Shooter)
- 2005 - Paper Anniversary (Six Shooter)
- 2007 - Nevertheless (Six Shooter)
- 2011 - Femmes de chez nous (Six Shooter)
- 2014 - Burning Daylight
- 2018 - Roses on the Vine
- 2022 - Stuff We All Get
- 2023 - Hold Music (with John K. Samson as Vivat Virtute)
