= Jason Tait =

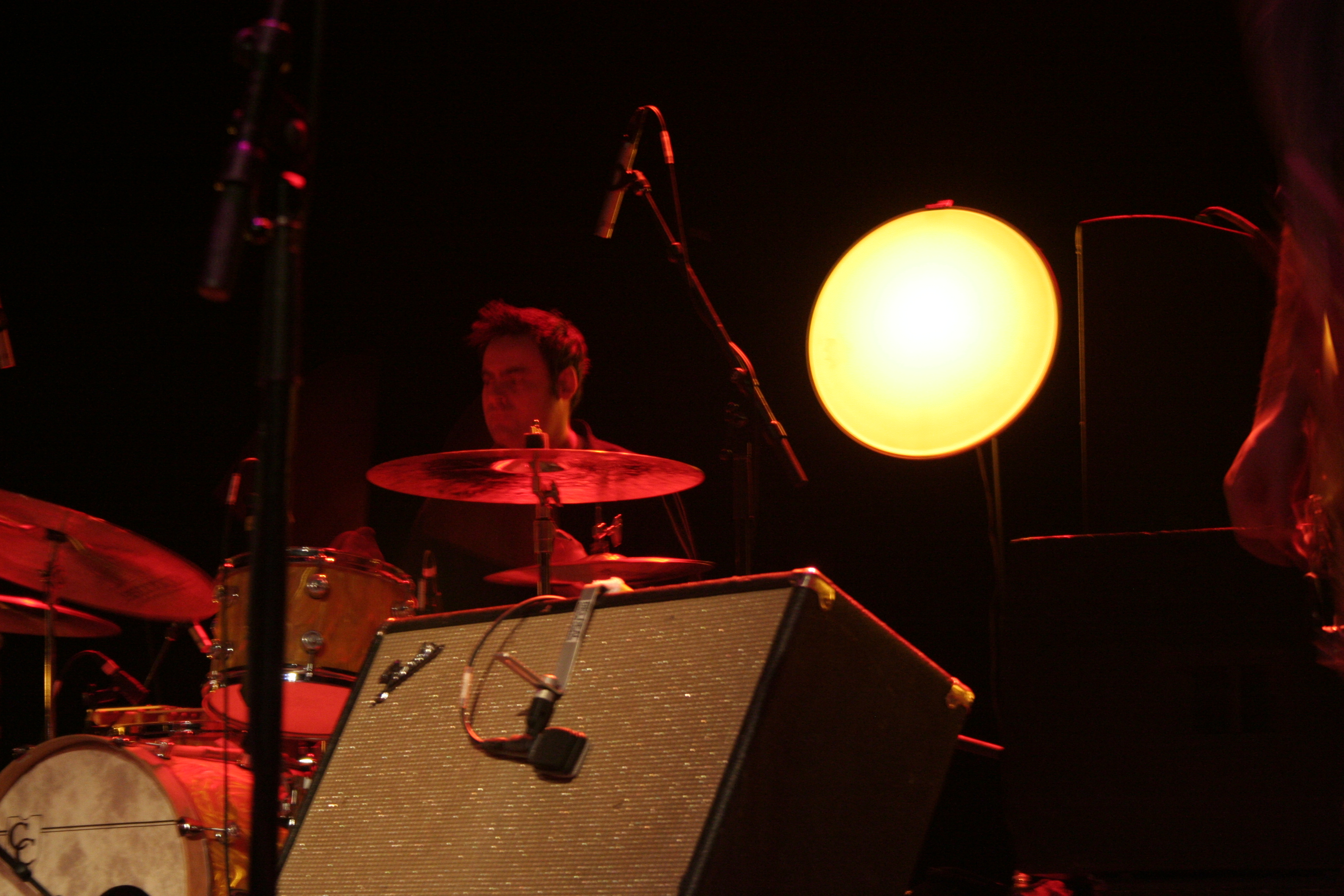
- Tait performing with the Weakerthans in Winnipeg 22 December 2007

Background information
- Origin: Winnipeg, Manitoba, Canada
- Genre: Indie rock
- Instrument: Drums

Jason Tait is a Canadian musician from Winnipeg, Manitoba. He is the drummer for the Canadian indie rock band The Weakerthans. Tait has also been a contributing member of Broken Social Scene and The FemBots.

== Career ==
Tait played drums for the Painted Thin's 1995 album, Small Acts of Love and Rebellion; Stephen Carroll, guitarist for The Weakerthans, was also a member of Painted Thin.

Tait moved to Toronto in about 2003, and lived there for ten years. He played drums on Greg Graffin's 2006 album, Cold as the Clay, and Bob Egan's album The Glorious Decline.

In 2010, Tait set out on a cross-Canada tour with Toronto-based singer/songwriter Afie Jurvanen, who uses the stage name Bahamas.

Tait returned to Winnipeg in 2013. In 2015, he collaborated with his Weakerthans bandmate John K. Samson, Christine Fellows, and Ashley Au on the music for For the Turnstiles, a dance performance by Winnipeg's Contemporary Dancers troupe inspired by Neil Young's 1974 album On the Beach. In 2016, Tait and Fellows coproduced Samson's solo album Winter Wheat.

Currently, Tait continues to play drums for Bahamas. While on tour, he plays kits made by C&C Drums, a Gladstone, Missouri-based custom drums manufacturer whose products he endorses.

== See also ==
- Music of Canada
- Canadian rock
- List of Canadian musicians
