= John K. Samson =

Canadian musician

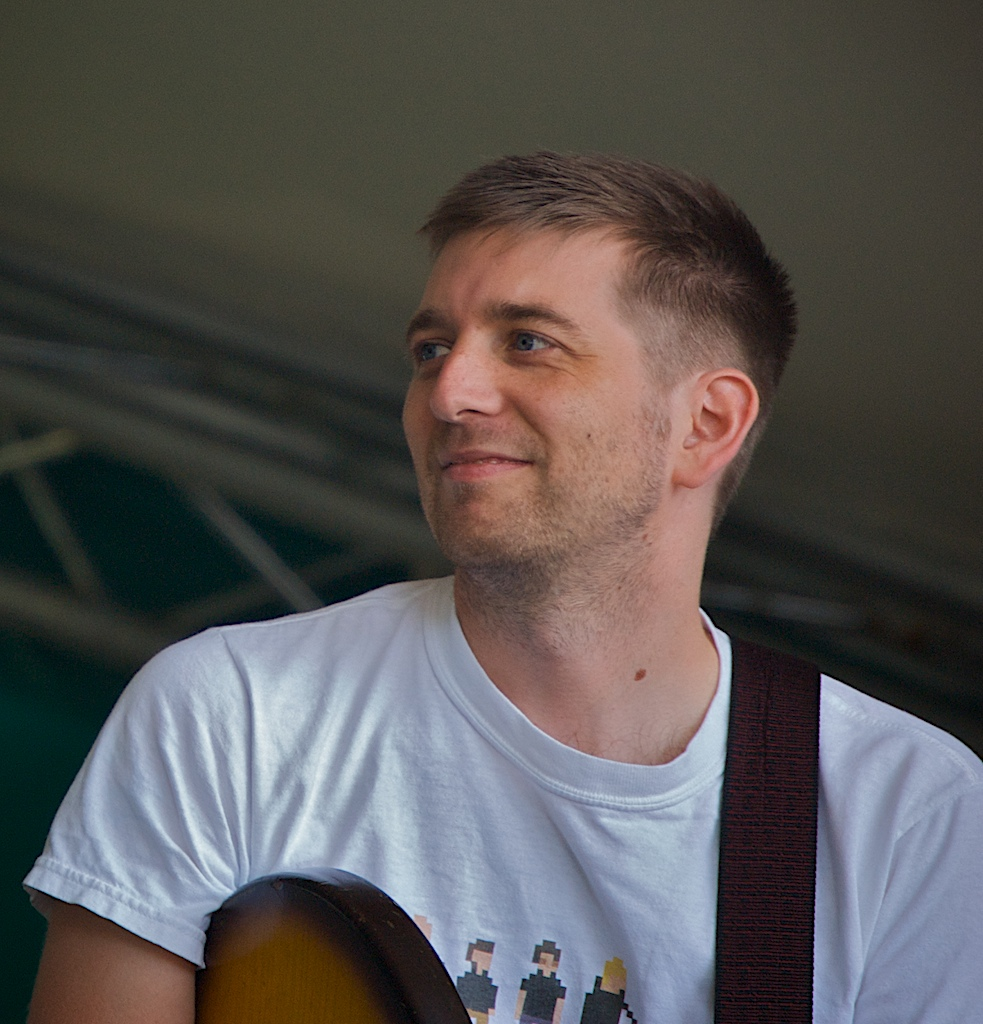
- Samson in 2008

Background information
- Born: John Kristjan Samson; 1973 (age 52–53)
- Origin: Winnipeg, Manitoba, Canada
- Genres: Folk punk, indie rock, post-punk, hardcore punk
- Occupations: Musician, songwriter
- Instruments: Vocals, guitar, bass
- Years active: 1980s–present
- Labels: Epitaph, ANTI-

John Kristjan Samson (born 1973) is a Canadian musician from Winnipeg, Manitoba. He is a singer-songwriter and best known as the frontman of the Canadian indie folk/rock band The Weakerthans. He also played bass in the punk band Propagandhi during the mid-1990s. Today, Samson is making music under his own name, John K. Samson. His latest solo album, Winter Wheat, was released in 2016. In recent interviews, he has used the name John Samson Fellows.

== Music ==
In 1993, while still a member of Propagandhi, Samson released a fifteen-track solo album on cassette tape, entitled Slips and Tangles. In 1995, six of these songs were featured on a split album shared with the now-defunct punk band Painted Thin. Following the critical success of The Weakerthans, Samson's side of the split was re-released online by G7 Welcoming Committee as a digital EP in 2006.

In 1995, also while still in Propagandhi, Samson released the song "Letter of Resignation" on a split with F.Y.P. Although credited to Propagandhi, Samson was the only band member to appear on the song. He later rerecorded "Letter of Resignation" on The Weakerthans' debut album, Fallow.

Between his time in Propagandhi and the formation of The Weakerthans, Samson was briefly a member of Dud, a short-lived band formed in 1996 with Mike Koop and James Ash. Dud played fewer than five shows and recorded seven songs before breaking up after only a few months.

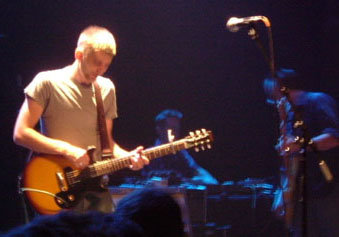
Samson performing with the Weakerthans in Montreal, 2004

In 2006, he and his wife Christine Fellows recorded The Old House, an album intended as a Christmas gift for friends and family. They eventually released two songs, "Taps Reversed" and "Good Salvage", for airplay on CBC Radio 3 in 2007. Fellows and Samson also performed live on the network on March 17, 2007, to mark the final night of the network's terrestrial simulcast on CBC Radio 2. Both Samson and Fellows also participated in writing and performing music for Clive Holden's multimedia project Trains of Winnipeg.

In 2008, Samson collaborated with electronic musician Blunderspublik and Inuk throat singer Nikki Komaksiutiksak on the song "Keewatin Arctic", as part of the collaborative music project Record of the Week Club.

Shortly afterward, Samson announced his first solo project since 1995's Little Pictures: a series of 7" releases about Manitoba roads, which he planned to release over the next 18 months. The first, City Route 85, was released on November 3, 2009, through Epitaph and ANTI-. In August 2010, Samson announced his next EP, Provincial Road 222, to be released on September 21. In December 2010, the Weakerthans performed four concerts in Winnipeg, one for each of their albums. In their final concert at the Burton Cummings Theatre, they performed all four of their albums in one night.

In 2011, Samson, Fellows and Sandro Perri participated in the National Parks Project, working with filmmaker Daniel Cockburn to produce and score a short film about Ontario's Bruce Peninsula National Park.

On November 29, 2011, Anti- Records announced that Samson would be releasing his 'first full-length solo album', Provincial, on January 24, 2012.

He appears on Michael Feuerstack's 2014 album Singer Songer, contributing vocals to the song "Friday Night Guard".

In 2015, Samson, Fellows, Ashley Au and Jason Tait collaborated on the music for For the Turnstiles, a dance performance by Winnipeg's Contemporary Dancers troupe inspired by Neil Young's 1974 album On the Beach.

On August 15, 2016, Samson announced that his second solo album, Winter Wheat, would be released on October 21, 2016. While technically a solo album, Winter Wheat features contributions by his Weakerthans bandmates Jason Tait and Greg Smith, and much of it was recorded by Weakerthans sound tech Cam Loeppky.

In 2018, Samson recorded a version of Fellows' "Saturday Night at Utopia Parkway" for a split single with American musician Kevin Devine. In 2019 he collaborated with Safia Nolin on a cover of Taking Back Sunday's "Cute Without the E" for her EP xX3m0 $0ng$ 2 $!nG @L0nG 2Xx.

In February 2020, Samson wrote and released "Millennium for All", a song supporting the activist campaign against the new security restrictions at Winnipeg's Millennium Library. He followed up in July with the single "Fantasy Baseball at the End of the World".

In February 2023, Fellows and Samson released Hold Music, an album of almost entirely instrumental music except one song with vocals by Samson. The album was credited to Vivat Virtute, the name of Fellows' online music and crafts store.

In a March 2026 interview with online magazine Hazlitt, Samson stated that his interest in creating new music has "dried up" and instead has focused on hobbies such as weaving, Sacred Harp singing and sometimes playing music in small shows around Winnipeg.

== Other activities ==
Samson is also a founding member of Arbeiter Ring Publishing, a publishing collective. In 2012 he published his Lyrics and Poems, 1997-2012 with the press.

In 2006, Samson championed Miriam Toews' novel A Complicated Kindness in the Canadian Broadcasting Corporation's annual Canada Reads, and the novel went on to win the competition. In the 2007 edition of Canada Reads—an "all-star" competition pitting the five winning advocates from previous years against each other—Samson returned to champion Heather O'Neill's novel Lullabies for Little Criminals, which also won the competition.

In 2008 and 2009, Samson spent several weeks working at the CBC's Winnipeg studios as part of the production team for the CBC Radio 2 program The Signal.

Samson was a writer in residence at the University of Manitoba in 2013. He has also been adjunct professor with the Creative Writing Program at the University of British Columbia.

Samson and Christine Fellows frequently produce music for Jonathan Goldstein's podcast "Heavyweight".

== Personal life ==
Samson is married to Canadian singer-songwriter Christine Fellows. Samson is a Quaker.

== Discography ==
=== Albums ===
- Slips and Tangles – 1993
- Provincial – 2012
- Winter Wheat – 2016
- Hold Music – 2023 (with Christine Fellows as Vivat Virtute)

=== EPs ===
- Little Pictures – 1995
- City Route 85 – 2009
- Provincial Road 222 – 2010
- June First – 2023 (with Christine Fellows as Vivat Virtute)

=== Singles ===
Year	Song	Peak chart positions	Album
Year	Song	CAN Alt	Album
2012	"Cruise Night"	36	Provincial
2012	"When I Write My Master's Thesis"	29	Provincial
2016	"Postdoc Blues"	—	Winter Wheat
2017	"Prayer for Ruby Elm"	—	non-album single
2018	"Saturday Night on Utopia Parkway"	—	Devinyl Series No. 10
2020	"Millennium for All"	—	non-album single
2020	"Fantasy Baseball at the End of the World"	—	non-album single
"—" denotes releases that did not chart.
