= Propagandhi discography =

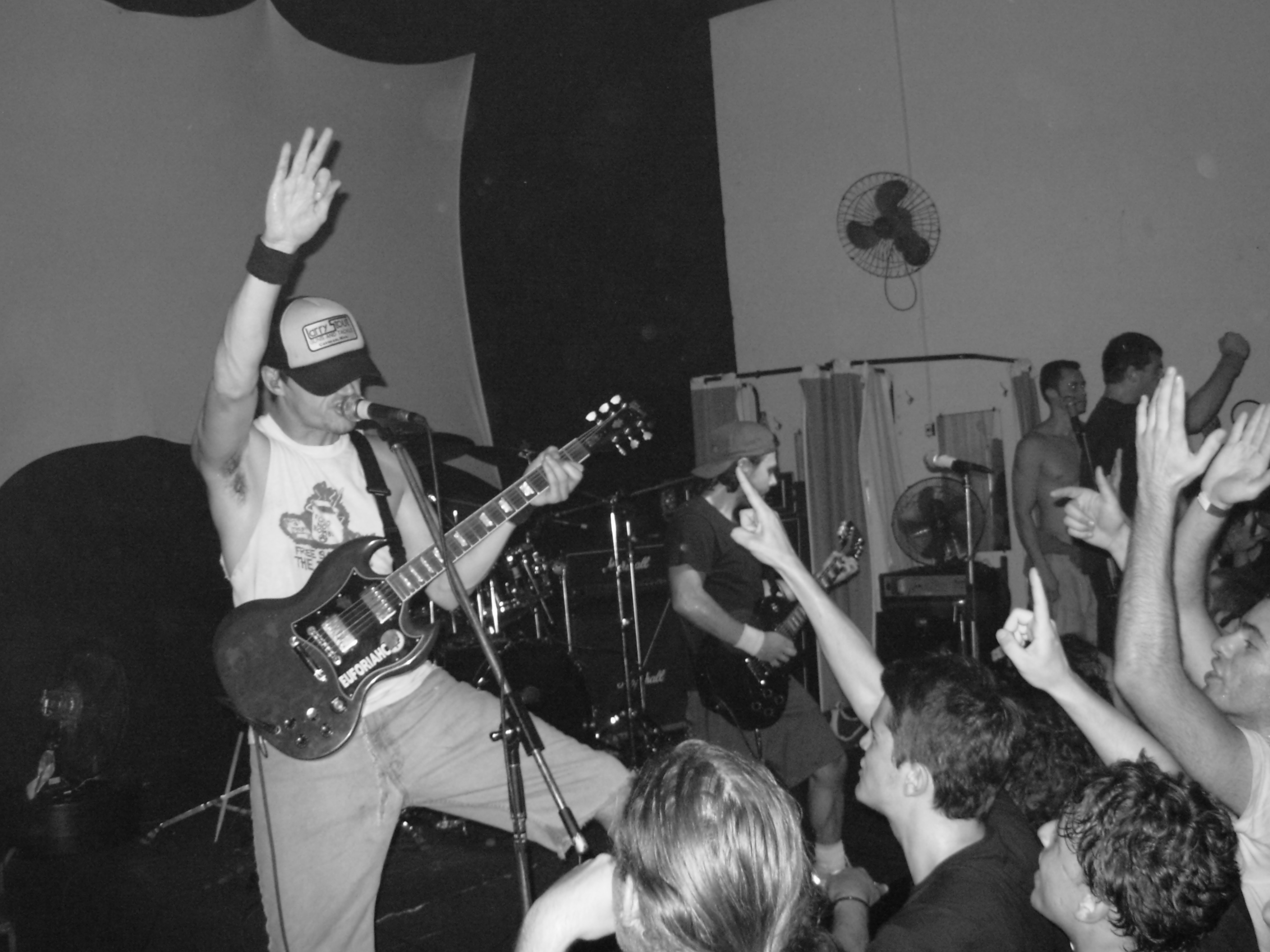
- Propagandhi performing in 2007
- Studio albums: 8
- Extended plays: 3
- Live albums: 2
- Compilation albums: 1
- Music videos: 1
- Split albums: 3

The discography of Canadian punk rock / thrash band Propagandhi, consists of eight studio albums, three extended plays, four splits, two live albums, three demo tapes, one compilation album and a handful of tracks released on various other compilations.

== Studio albums ==
| Year | Title | Information | Peak chart positions | | |
| Year | Title | Information | CAN | AUS | US |
|---|---|---|---|---|---|
| 1993 | How to Clean Everything | Released: May 31, 1993; Labels: Fat Wreck Chords; Formats: CD, 12" vinyl | — | — | — |
| 1996 | Less Talk, More Rock | Released: April 23, 1996; Label: Fat Wreck Chords; Formats: CD, 12" vinyl | — | — | — |
| 2001 | Today's Empires, Tomorrow's Ashes | Released: February 6, 2001; Label: Fat Wreck Chords; Formats: CD, 12" vinyl | — | — | — |
| 2005 | Potemkin City Limits | Released: October 18, 2005; Label: Fat Wreck Chords; Formats: CD, 12" vinyl | 92 | — | — |
| 2009 | Supporting Caste | Released: March 10, 2009; Label: G7 Welcoming Committee, Smallman; Formats: CD, 12" vinyl | 28 | 86 | 162 |
| 2012 | Failed States | Released: September 4, 2012; Label: Epitaph; Formats: CD, 12" vinyl | — | — | 107 |
| 2017 | Victory Lap | Released: September 29, 2017; Label: Epitaph; Formats: CD, 12" vinyl | 32 | 26 | 68 |
| 2025 | At Peace | Released: May 2, 2025; Label: Epitaph; Formats: CD, 12" vinyl, digital | — | 39 | — |
"—" denotes a recording that did not chart or was not released in that territory.

== Extended plays ==
| Year | Information |
|---|---|
| 1993 | How to Clean a Couple o' Things: Released: 1993; Labels: Fat Wreck Chords; Formats: 7" vinyl |
| 1994 | Where Quality Is Job #1: Released: 1994; Label: Recess Records; Formats: 7" vinyl |
| 2010 | The Recovered EP: Released: April 6, 2010; Label: G7 Welcoming Committee Records; Formats: Digital download |

== Splits ==
| Year | Information |
|---|---|
| 1994 | I'd Rather Be Flag-Burning: Released: 1994; Labels: Recess Records, G7 Welcoming Committee Records; Formats: 10" vinyl, CD; Other artist: I Spy |
| 1995 | Propagandhi/F.Y.P.: Released: 1995; Label: Recess Records; Formats: 7" vinyl; Other artist: F.Y.P. |
| 1995 | Systematic Destruction: Released: 1995; Label: Bad Food For Thought Records; Formats: 7" vinyl; Other artists: I Spy, Malefaction, Silence Equals |
| 2010 | Sacrifice/Propagandhi: Released: 2010; Label: War On Music; Formats: 7" vinyl; Other artists: Sacrifice |

== Live ==
| Year | Information |
|---|---|
| 1995 | Yep.: Released: 1995; Labels: Applecore Records; Formats: Cassette |
| 2007 | Live from Occupied Territory: Released: 2007; Label: G7 Welcoming Committee Records; Formats: CD, DVD |

== Demo tapes ==
| Year | Information |
|---|---|
| 1990 | We Don't Get Paid, We Don't Get Laid, and Boy Are We Lazy: Released: 1990; Labels: Independent; Formats: Cassette |
| 1991 | Fuck the Scene: Released: 1991; Label: Independent; Formats: Cassette |
| 1992 | Martial Law with a Cherry on Top: Released: 1992; Label: Independent; Formats: Cassette |

== Compilations ==
| Year | Information |
|---|---|
| 1998 | Where Quantity Is Job #1: Released: November 15, 1998; Labels: G7 Welcoming Committee Records; Formats: CD, 12" vinyl |

== Videography ==
| Year | Title | Director |
|---|---|---|
| 2017 | "Failed Imagineer" | Randy Frykas |

== Other appearances ==
- "Portage La Prairie" from Play at Your Own Risk, Volume 2 (Recess Records, 1994)—credited to Propagandhi but actually just fellow Winnipeg musician (who would later go on to collaborate with then Propagandhi bassist John K. Samson in The Weakerthans) John Sutton singing over a synthesized beat.
- "Nation States" from Survival of the Fattest (Fat Wreck Chords, 1996), a different version of the track found on Less Talk, More Rock
- "The Only Good Fascist is a Dead Fascist (Dallas Hansen Dance Mix)" from Better Read Than Dead (AK Press/Epitaph Records, 1994), the same track from Less Talk, More Rock but with an answering machine message critical of the band played before and after the song
- "Hard Times", a Cro-Mags cover from Return of the Read Menace (AK Press, G7 Welcoming Committee Records, 1998), the first studio-recorded track to feature bassist Todd Kowalski.
- "War is Peace, Slavery is Freedom, May All Your Interventions Be Humanitarian" from Live Fat, Die Young (Fat Wreck Chords, 2001)—an updated version of the song "Fine Day" (available on Where Quantity Is Job #1) with completely new lyrics.
