= I'd Rather Be Flag-Burning =

EP by Propagandhi and I Spy
- Released: 1994
- Recorded: February 19, 1994 at God Of Thunder Studios, Winnipeg
- Genre: Punk rock, hardcore punk
- Length: 24:18 (10" edition); 28:29 (CD edition)
- Label: Recess Records, G7 Welcoming Committee Records

Propagandhi and I Spy chronology
Where Quality Is Job #1 (1994)	I'd Rather Be Flag-Burning (1994)	Propagandhi/F.Y.P. (1995)

I'd Rather Be Flag-Burning is a 1994 split release between Propagandhi and I Spy. It was released on 10" vinyl by Recess Records, with two pressings of 1000 copies each. A CD version was also released by G7 Welcoming Committee Records that concluded with an unlisted track by Last Man on Earth, a short-lived band which included members of both bands.

Each band's songs were compiled in 1998, without the CD-only bonus track, by G7 Welcoming Committee Records on two separate compilation albums: Propagandhi's Where Quantity Is Job #1 and I Spy's Perversity Is Spreading ...It's About Time!!!

The liner notes between all of the releases include various versions of the song titles.

== Track listing ==
Propagandhi side
No.	Title	Length
1.	"The Overtly-Political-But-Oh-So-Intensely-Personal-Song" (a.k.a. "Mutual Friend")	0:47
2.	"...Little Ditty" (unlisted track)	0:33
3.	"...And We Thought Nation-States Were a Bad Idea"	2:28
4.	"The Woe-Is-Me-I'm-So-Misunderstood-Song" (a.k.a. "The About-as-Close-to-Emo-as-We'll-Ever-Get Song" & "Utter Crap Song")	1:29
5.	"(I Want to See) Oka Everywhere" (a.k.a. "I Would Very Much Like to See What Happened at Oka in 1990 Happen Everywhere")	2:21
6.	"Noam Chomsky - On Violence" (unlisted track, a.k.a. "Chomsky Being Smart")	0:35
7.	"Haillie Does Hebron" (a.k.a. "Haillie Sellasse, Up Your Ass")	3:35

Tracks 3 and 7 are alternate versions from those on Less Talk, More Rock and How to Clean Everything.

I Spy side
No.	Title	Length
1.	"Remain"	1:30
2.	"Just Between Friends"	2:06
3.	"No Exchange"	1:27
4.	"T.I.Y (Title It Yourself)"	0:30
5.	"Falling Down" (a.k.a. "Digging a Grave" & "De-Titled")	1:08
6.	"Ever Wonder Why?" (a.k.a. "Because They Can't Speak for Themselves, Fucker" & "Regrettably Titled")	0:37
7.	"Sixty Billion Served"	2:18
8.	"Appliances and Cars"	2:54
