= The Recovered EP =

EP by Propagandhi
- Released: April 6, 2010
- Recorded: 1993, 1996, 2009
- Genre: Punk rock, skate punk
- Length: 8:38
- Label: G7 Welcoming Committee Records

Propagandhi chronology
| Supporting Caste (2009) | The Recovered EP (2010) |

The Recovered EP is a digital EP released by Canadian punk band Propagandhi on April 6, 2010. It comprises three previously unreleased tracks from the How to Clean Everything and Less Talk, More Rock sessions, remixed by lead singer and guitarist Chris Hannah. The EP was released to benefit Partners in Health, to whom all profits are donated.

== Track listing ==
1. "What Price Will You Pay?" (Code of Honor cover) – 1:50
2. "Leg-Hold Trap" (Toothpick Hercules cover) – 2:34
3. "Gamble" (The Lowest of the Low cover) – 4:15

== Songs ==
"What Price Will You Pay?" was originally written by Code of Honor and "Gamble" was originally by The Lowest of the Low. Both covers have drum and bass tracks from the Less Talk, More Rock master tapes, with new guitar and vocal tracks recorded by Chris Hannah at his home studio in 2009.

"Leg-Hold Trap" was recorded during the How to Clean Everything sessions, but was ultimately vetoed from the album. It is a Toothpick Hercules cover and one of the few Propagandhi songs sung by then bassist John K. Samson (now of The Weakerthans).
