= Potemkin City Limits =

Studio album by Propagandhi
- Released: October 18, 2005
- Genre: Melodic hardcore
- Length: 41:25
- Label: G7 Welcoming Committee/Fat Wreck Chords

Propagandhi chronology
Today's Empires, Tomorrow's Ashes (2001)	Potemkin City Limits (2005)	Supporting Caste (2009)

Professional ratings
Review scores
Source	Rating
AllMusic	4/5 stars
Punknews.org	4.5/5 stars
Stylus Magazine	C

Potemkin City Limits is the fourth studio album by the Canadian punk rock band Propagandhi, released on October 18, 2005 through G7 Welcoming Committee Records in Canada, and Fat Wreck Chords elsewhere. It is the second Propagandhi release on their own label and the last on Fat Wreck Chords.

The title of the album is an allusion to Potemkin village, a political term referring to a false construct intended to hide an undesirable situation.

The opening track, "A Speculative Fiction", won the first annual ECHO Songwriting Prize from the Society of Composers, Authors, and Music Publishers of Canada (SOCAN). The band pledged to use the $5,000 prize to make donations to the Haiti Action Network and The Welcome Place, an organization in Winnipeg (which they'd previously done volunteer work for) which helps refugees start new lives in Manitoba.

== Release ==
On August 30, 2005, Potemkin City Limits was announced for release in two months' time; alongside this, its artwork and track listing was posted online. Three days later, "America's Army™ (Die Jugend Marschiert)" was made available for download through AmaericasArm.ca, which was made as a parody of the America's Army video game series. Potemkin City Limits was released on October 18, 2005 through the G7 Welcoming Committee Records in Canada, and Fat Wreck Chords in the US. The artwork, a girl playing jump rope on a chalk-drawings covered street, is a piece of art called Children's Games from the anarchist artist Eric Drooker. In November and December 2005, they went on a cross-country US tour, dubbed the Crimean Tour; they were joined on all dates by the Greg MacPherson Band, while Toys That Kill and fellow Fat Wreck Chords act Western Addiction appeared on select shows. In April 2006, the album was released on vinyl. In October 2006, they embarked on a tour of Canada with I Hate Sally, Hiretsukan, GFK, and DeadPoets appearing on various shows. In December 2006, the band toured the UK with Hiretsukan and GFK. After returning to Canada, they went on a short Western tour with GFK.

== Track listing ==
1. "A Speculative Fiction" – 4:14
2. "Fixed Frequencies" – 3:58
3. "Fedallah's Hearse" – 4:00
4. "Cut into the Earth" – 3:41
5. "Bringer of Greater Things" – 2:45
6. "America's Army™ (Die Jugend Marschiert)" – 4:42
7. "Rock for Sustainable Capitalism" – 4:12
8. "Impending Halfhead" – 1:14
9. "Life at Disconnect" – 3:23
10. "Name and Address Withheld" – 3:21
11. "Superbowl Patriot XXXVI (Enter the Mendicant)" – 0:36
12. "Iteration" – 5:19

== Personnel ==
- Chris Hannah – guitar, vocals
- Jord Samolesky – drums
- Todd Kowalski – bass, vocals

== Charts ==
Chart performance for Potemkin City Limits
Chart (2005)	Peak position
Canadian Albums (Nielsen SoundScan)	92
US Heatseekers Albums (Billboard)	25
US Independent Albums (Billboard)	32
