= Declan de Barra =

Irish writer and musician

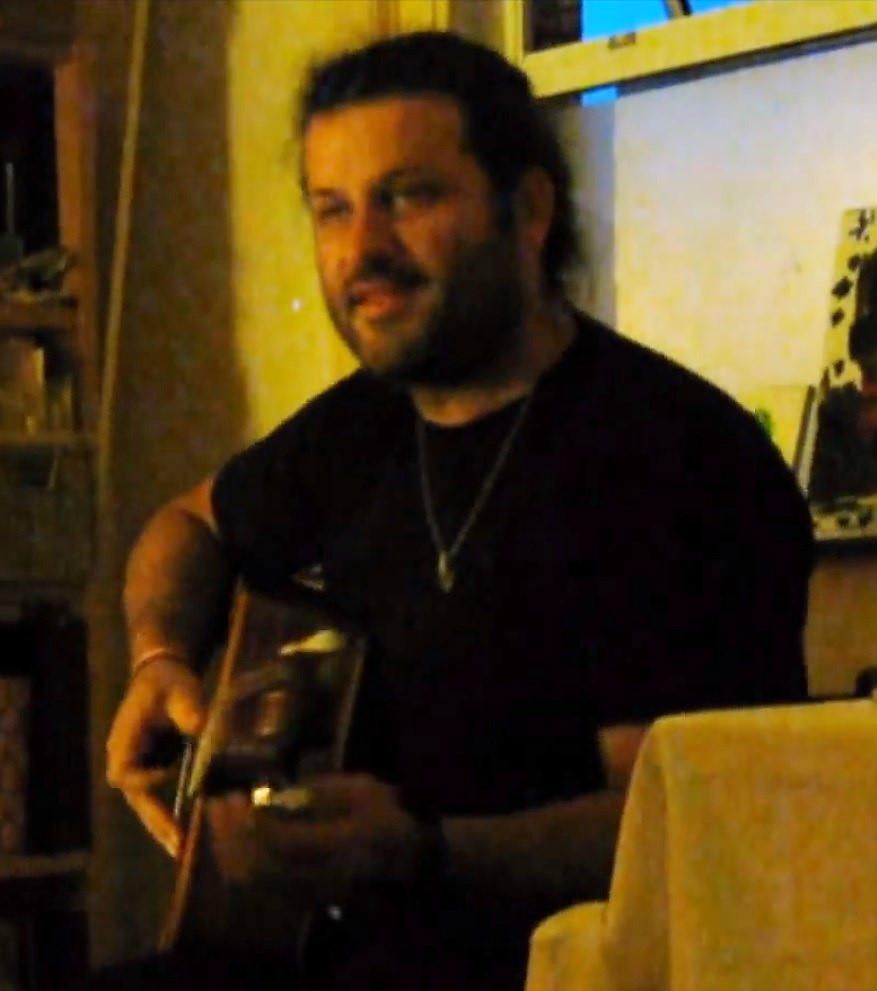
- de Barra sings at Dublin house show in 2011
- Born: Bunmahon, County Waterford, Ireland
- Occupations: Musician, animator, screenwriter
- Known for: Clann Zú; The Witcher

Declan de Barra is an Irish musician, animator and screenwriter, best known for his work in American television. In addition, de Barra's animations have featured in various international film festivals.

== Music ==
Born in Bunmahon, County Waterford, Ireland, de Barra emigrated to Australia in 1989 and started playing in various bands while studying fine art in Perth, Western Australia. He toured the country for a number of years with his group Non-Intentional Lifeform on Dutch label Roadrunner Records. In 1999 he formed the musical group Clann Zú featuring various musicians from Melbourne's classical, punk and electronic scenes. Clann Zú released two albums Rua and Black Coats and Bandages on Canadian political label G7 Welcoming Committee. de Barra returned to Ireland in 2002, continuing to perform with Clann Zú on their final tour throughout 2004 in Canada and Australia. In 2005 he released a debut solo album, Song of a Thousand Birds followed by "A Fire to Scare the Sun" in 2008, and "Fragments Footprints & the Forgotten" in 2011, all on Swedish Label, Black Star Foundation. de Barra creates all the artwork for his records.

== Screenwriting ==
de Barra has worked as a writer for Aardman's Canimals and CBBC's Funky Fables and Roy. He transitioned onto more adult content, working on The CW's horror series The Originals, a spin-off of The Vampire Diaries, and the Marvel/Netflix television series Iron Fist. He wrote episodes of Netflix's The Witcher, as well as singing on four tracks on the official soundtrack. He is the creator and showrunner on The Witcher prequel series, The Witcher: Blood Origin. De Barra also sang the track 'Pray to the Sun' for Netflix' One Piece Season 2 soundtrack.
