= Play at Your Own Risk, Volume 2 =

Compilation album by various artists
- Released: 1995
- Genre: punk rock/hardcore punk
- Label: Recess Records

Play at Your Own Risk, Volume 2 is a compilation of punk rock/hardcore punk bands released by Recess Records in 1995. It was issued as a double 7" and single 5" in a tri-fold jacket and sometimes included a lyrics poster and Halloween napkin. It includes several rare tracks, such as the Propagandhi song "Portage La Prairie", which was not released on their compilation Where Quantity Is Job #1.

== Track listing ==
7" #1

1. "Roadkill" - Quincy Punx
2. "I Think I Got the Blues" - The Crumbs
3. "Riviera Foom Style Now" - Black Fork
4. "Abortion" - Annie & Candy Clutz
5. "Graduation" - Second Hand

7" #2

1. "Breakout" - Pud
2. "Don't Care" - Slackers
3. "Ruin Your Day" - Chickenhead
4. "Shithole" - Les Turds
5. "I'm a Criminal" - Teamsters

5"

1. "Portage La Prairie" - Propagandhi
2. "When We Grow Up" - I Spy
