= Fambly 42 =

Studio album by Toys That Kill
- Released: 2012
- Genre: Punk Rock
- Label: Recess Records

Toys That Kill chronology
Shanked! (2006)	Fambly 42 (2012)	Sentimental Ward (2016)

Fambly 42 is the fourth studio album by San Pedro-based punk band Toys That Kill, released on May 15, 2012 on Recess Records. It was the first album recorded in their own Clown Sound studios.

== Track listing ==
1. "Mobbed By the 3's" – 1:44
2. "V-Chip" – 1:10
3. "Waltz One Million" – 2:16
4. "The Nervous Rocks" – 1:38
5. "Abort Me Mother Earth" – 2:18
6. "Stye" – 2:15
7. "I'm Foaming!" – 2:34
8. "I've Been Stabbed!" – 1:05
9. "Ape Me" – 1:22
10. "Who Scored?" – 2:36
11. "Fambly" – 1:46
12. "I Don't Wanna Be Around" – 2:07
13. "Freddy and His Mother" – 3:22
14. "Cold Boys" – 2:08
15. "Clap For Alaska" – 3:26

| total_length = 31:47

== Personnel ==
- Todd Congelliere – Vocals, Guitar
- Sean Cole – Vocals, Guitar
- Jimmy Felix – Drums
- Chachi Ferrera – Bass, Vocals

== Reception ==
PopMatters praised the album and described it as "fifteen tracks of fist-pumping sing-along punk rock you’ll definitely want to heft a beverage to." Punk News gave the album three and a half stars and but conceded that "overall Fambly essentially consists of one good song rewritten many times over." Razorcake called the album "the aural equivalent of a culinary masterpiece."
