= Black coat =

Black coat, blackcoat or variant may refer to:

- Any kind of coat that is black
  - Black (horse), horses that are black coated
- Chernodreshkovci, the traditional dress of the Shopi
- The Black Coat, 2013 novel by Neamat Imam
- The Black Coats a.k.a. Les Habits Noirs, 19th century crime fiction novel series by Paul Féval
- Black Coat Press, publishing firm translating and publishing French pulpers into English
- A clergyman

== See also ==
- Black Coats & Bandages, 2004 album by Clann Zu
  - Black Coats & Bandages, 2004 song from the eponymous album by Clann Zu, see Black Coats & Bandages
- Black robe (disambiguation)
- Black (disambiguation)
- Coat (disambiguation)
