= Shithole =

A shithole is a profane term for a dirty or dysfunctional place. Shithole may also refer to:

- Shithole, a song by Les Turds on the compilation album Play at Your Own Risk, Volume 2
- Shit Hole, a song on the 2005 film score album Saw II
- The Shithole, a spoken word piece on the 2006 album Boned!
- Shithole, a 2016 song by Canadian band Weaves

== See also ==
- "Shithole countries", a comment made by Donald Trump in 2018
- Shit
- Shit (disambiguation)
