= Sentimental Ward =

Studio album by Toys That Kill
- Released: 2016
- Genre: Punk Rock
- Label: Recess Records

Toys That Kill chronology
Fambly 42 (2012)	Sentimental Ward (2016)

Sentimental Ward is the fifth studio album by San Pedro-based punk band Toys That Kill, released on July 1, 2016 on Recess Records. An album release show was held at The Echo in Los Angeles.

== Track listing ==
1. S.D.R.T.T.Go!
2. The Safe Song
3. New Recruits
4. The Constant Belly Up
5. Form Your Fiend
6. Sentimental Ward
7. Silent War
8. Four String
9. War On Words
10. Soap
11. Flypaper to Psycho
12. Ready To Fall
13. Hidden Track
14. Times We Can't Let Go
15. Melt The Ice
16. Lazy

== Personnel ==
- Todd Congelliere – Vocals, Guitar
- Sean Cole – Vocals, Guitar
- Jimmy Felix – Drums
- Chachi Ferrera – Bass, Vocals

== Reception ==
Ty Stranglehold of Razorcake declared of the album "It makes the hairs on the back of my neck stand up when I listen to it. I can’t stop listening to it."
