= FYP =

FYP may refer to:

- Five-year plan
- "For You" page on TikTok, which allows users to view a feed of recommended videos
- Foundation year program
- F.Y.P, an American punk band (1989–1999)
