= Todd Kowalski =

Canadian bassist and singer (born 1973)

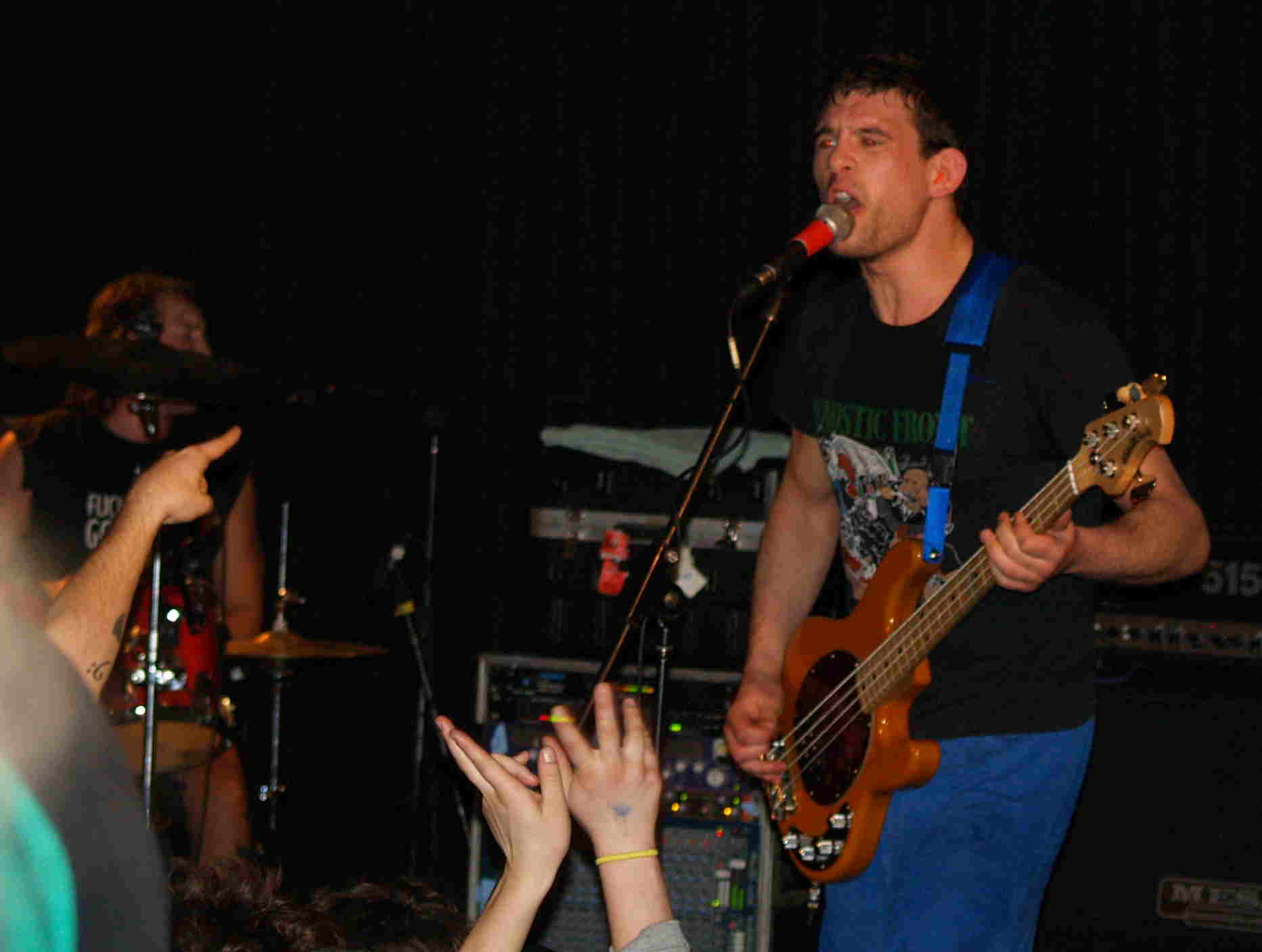
- Todd Kowalski performing in Saskatoon with Propagandhi, March 2007.

Background information
- Born: May 27, 1973 (age 52); Regina, Saskatchewan, Canada
- Origin: Regina, Saskatchewan
- Genres: Hardcore punk, thrash metal
- Instruments: Bass guitar, Electric guitar, Vocals
- Years active: Early 1990s–present

Todd "The Rod" Kowalski (born May 27, 1973) is a Canadian bassist and singer, currently a member of hardcore punk band Propagandhi. Along with his band, he lives a vegan lifestyle and supports animal rights.

== Career ==
In the early 1990s, Kowalski was the frontman of I Spy, a hardcore punk band from Regina, originally called Klump. He and the band moved to Winnipeg in 1994. They recorded a split CD/10" with Propagandhi. I Spy played together until the summer of 1996, when they decided to call it quits.

In 1996, Kowalski joined a band called Swallowing Shit who released a 7" record and an anthology CD.

Kowalski joined Propagandhi in 1997 and also played bass for J Church on their 1997 Japanese tour.

In 1998, G7 Welcoming Committee Records released an I Spy anthology album called Perversity is Spreading... It's About Time. Today, he is the bassist for the band Propagandhi and has so far recorded six albums with them, Today's Empires, Tomorrow's Ashes (2001), Potemkin City Limits (2005), Supporting Caste (2009), Failed States (2012), Victory Lap (2017), and At Peace (2025).

He contributed guest vocals to the Western Addiction song "Taedium", from their 2017 album, Tremulous and bass on Protest the Hero's song "The Canary" on their album Palimpsest (2020).

Todd Kowalski is a Brazilian jiu-jitsu black belt under Rodrigo Mundaruca in Winnipeg.

== Gallery ==
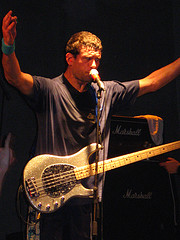
