= Shanked =

Shanked!

Studio album by Toys That Kill
- Released: May 30, 2006
- Genre: Punk Rock
- Label: Recess Records

Toys That Kill chronology
Control the Sun (2003)	Shanked! (2006)	Fambly 42 (2012)

Shanked! is the third studio album by San Pedro-based punk band Toys That Kill, released on May 30, 2006 by Recess Records.

== Track listing ==
1. "Katzenscheibe Uber Alles"
2. "Bomb Sniffin' Dogs"
3. "Bill Buckner"
4. "Run Away..."
5. "Safe & Warm"
6. "Mr. Hubbard's Dead"
7. "They Caught Us All"
8. "They Tied Up All Our Lace"
9. "Katzenscheibe Uber Alles"
10. "Widows On Welfare"
11. "Liar's Hook"
12. "I Hate Karma"
13. "Peeping On Peeping Tom"
14. "The Worm's Inside"
15. "Sound Check World"
16. "Activate"
17. "31 Year Old Daydream"

== Personnel ==
- Todd Congelliere – Vocals, Guitar
- Sean Cole – Vocals, Guitar
- Jimmy Felix – Drums
- Chachi Ferrera – Bass, Vocals

== Reception ==
Punk News gave the album four stars and called it "an incredibly enjoyable, incredibly simple, incredibly incredible punk album."
