= Victory Lap (Propagandhi album) =

Studio album by Propagandhi
- Released: September 29, 2017
- Studio: Private Ear
- Genres: Melodic hardcore, thrash metal
- Length: 36:29
- Label: Epitaph

Propagandhi chronology
| Failed States (2012) | Victory Lap (2017) | At Peace (2025) |

Victory Lap is the seventh studio album by the Canadian punk rock band Propagandhi. Released on September 29, 2017, it is the first Propagandhi album to feature Sulynn Hago on guitar. While Hago was originally recruited to be a live member and their predecessor David Guillas was intended to continue performing on studio releases, the album features Hago as a full band member while Guillas provided some guitar parts as a "Propagandhi alumnus".

== Writing ==
Frontman Chris Hannah said of the writing process:

"For most of the songs I wrote on this record I tried to go in with a different philosophy than I have in the past. Instead of labouring over every word and making everything perfectly fit some sort of end result, the rule was 'First thing out of my mouth is the first thing that goes on the paper.'"

And of his current position as a songwriter:

"I think back in the Less Talk era, it was more like, 'Give me the fuckin' bullhorn and let me talk about me.' But I've modified that position somewhat. People say they're tired of hearing white, male voices, and so am I. I'm fuckin' tired of hearing my fuckin' self."

== Reception ==
Professional ratings
Review scores
| Source | Rating |
|---|---|
| Exclaim! | 7/10 |
| Narc | 5/5 stars |
| Paste | 8.3/10 |
| Sputnikmusic | 4.5/5 stars |

The album has received positive reviews from critics.

== Track listing ==
| No. | Title | Length |
|---|---|---|
| 1. | "Victory Lap" | 2:57 |
| 2. | "Comply/Resist" | 3:23 |
| 3. | "Cop Just Out of Frame" | 2:46 |
| 4. | "When All Your Fears Collide" | 3:18 |
| 5. | "Letters to a Young Anus" | 2:20 |
| 6. | "Lower Order (A Good Laugh)" | 3:06 |
| 7. | "Failed Imagineer" | 2:11 |
| 8. | "Call Before You Dig" | 2:22 |
| 9. | "Nigredo" | 4:13 |
| 10. | "In Flagrante Delicto" | 2:36 |
| 11. | "Tartuffe" | 2:36 |
| 12. | "Adventures in Zoochosis" | 4:41 |
| Total length: | | 36:29 |

Bonus tracks
| No. | Title | Length |
|---|---|---|
| 13. | "Wishing" (Government Issue cover) | 2:10 |
| 14. | "Beyond" (Government Issue cover) | 2:07 |
| 15. | "Technocracy" (Corrosion of Conformity cover) | 3:35 |
| 16. | "Laughing Stock" | 2:51 |

== Personnel ==
Propagandhi

- Chris Hannah – guitar, vocals
- Jord Samolesky – drums, backing vocals
- Todd Kowalski – bass guitar, vocals
- Sulynn Hago – guitar, backing vocals

Additional musician

- David Guillas – additional guitar

Artwork

- Tom Brenner – cover photo
- Greg Gallinger – insert photo painting
- Avrinder Dhillon – back cover photo
- Jason Link – layout
- Todd Kowalski – layout

Production

- John Paul Peters – producer
- Jason Livermore – mastering
