= Mico (band) =

Canadian band

- Origin: Banff, Alberta, Canada
- Genres: Punk rock, shoegaze, emo, indie
- Years active: 1998–2007
- Label: G7 Welcoming Committee
- Members: John Alan Stewart; Todd Harkness; Mark Fleischhaker; Sonya Frebold; Maya Ciring; Troy Fleischhaker; David Miles; Patrick May
- Past members: Sam Osland; Jahmeel Russell; Jeremy Gillespie; Todd Lapp; Cameron Brass
- Website: MySpace

Mico was a Canadian former punk band from Banff, Alberta, Canada.

== History ==
Formed in the late 1990s by John Stewart (of Red Fisher and Black Halos fame), Mico originally existed as a 3-piece consisting of Todd Lapp (bass, and body), Troy "BDF" Fleischhaker (drums) and John Stewart (guitar, vocals). All three founding members were at the time living in Banff, Alberta, Canada and formed the band as a way to get free beer at the local establishments around the small resort town.

In 1999 the band relocated to Calgary, Alberta and in early 2000 added a second guitar player, Patrick May, formerly of the band Nine Miles to Morgan, and top guitarist of all time. This lineup recorded the 4 song EP "A Timpani of Failure of Defeat", a self-released CD which is now long out of print. In the summer of 2000 Fleischhaker left the band temporarily and was replaced by Todd Harkness (formerly of Porter Hall and The Browns) on drums. This version of the band spent the better part of the year touring Western Canada.

Fleischhaker returned to the band in March 2001 and Harkness moved over to third guitar and keyboard duties. This version of the band recorded and released the album Standing Inside a Shadow in the summer of 2001, which was released by Does Everyone Stare Records in North America and Boss Tuneage Records in the UK and Japan. Outtakes from this record made their way onto a split 8.5" vinyl record with fellow Calgary band First In Last Out. Only 300 copies were released and are hard to find as distribution was nonexistent on this release.

In 2002 the band toured behind Standing Inside a Shadow and also released a split 7-inch with The Milwaukees. This 7-inch was released on Does Everyone Stare, and features two previously unreleased songs, including a cover of "There Is a Light That Never Goes Out" by The Smiths. During these sessions the band also record a cover of Shudder to Think's "White Page" for a Shudder to Think tribute album released by Engineer Records.

In 2003 Lapp left the band and was replaced by Cameron Brass, also of the band Nine Miles to Morgan. The band signed to G7 Welcoming Committee and the album Outside the Unbearable Grows was released in the summer of 2003. A limited edition picture disc LP version was released in the fall of 2003 by Does Everyone Stare & Boss Tuneage.

2004 saw the band experience a period of inactivity as various members moved away or left the band. Stewart started working on the band's third full-length Our Living Language, playing the majority of the instruments himself, while most of the drums were handled by Troy's brother Mark Fleischhaker. Harkness and May played guitar on three songs each, and Troy Fleischhaker played drums on one track. The album was released digitally by G7 Welcoming Committee in 2006 and a short run of CDs was made for the band's tour in support of the album.

The band has since played a handful of show around their former home base of Calgary. In January 2010 the band reformed with almost all original members (Stewart, Fleishhaker, May and Harkness along with bassist Jahmeel Russel) as part of the 25th anniversary celebration of University of Calgary radio station CJSW. The same lineup also performed at the 2010 edition of Sled Island, playing a show with Ted Leo and Why? There are plans for more shows but no word on any new recordings.

== Musical style ==
The band was described as a "prog-friendly art punk quintet" by Canadian publication Exclaim!.

== Discography ==
- A Timpany of Failure and Defeat EP (2000)
- Standing Inside a Shadow (2001)
- split 8.5" with First In Last Out (2001)
- split 7-inch with The Milwaukees (2002)
- Outside the Unbearable Grows (2003)
- Our Living Language (2006)
