= Propagandhi/F.Y.P. =

Propagandhi/F.Y.P

EP by Propagandhi and F.Y.P
- Released: June 30, 1995
- Recorded: 1995
- Genre: Punk rock
- Label: Recess

Propagandhi and F.Y.P chronology
I'd Rather Be Flag-Burning (1995)	Propagandhi/F.Y.P (1995)	Less Talk, More Rock (1996)

Propagandhi/F.Y.P is a 7" split between Propagandhi and F.Y.P, released in 1995.

== Track listing ==
1. "Mate Like Porcupines" - F.Y.P
2. "Dinky Bossetti" - F.Y.P
3. "Glamourettes" - F.Y.P
4. "Letter of Resignation" - Propagandhi

== Miscellanea ==
- Though credited to Propagandhi, "Letter of Resignation" features only bassist John K. Samson on vocals and guitar. Samson later rerecorded the song with his band The Weakerthans on the album Fallow.
