= Treasure Fleet =

- Origin: Chicago, Illinois
- Genres: Punk rock
- Label: Recess
- Members: Neil Hennessy; Mike Oberlin; Jon Olson; Preston Bryant; Dave Merriman; Eli Caterer; Isaac Thotz

Treasure Fleet, sometimes billed as The Treasure Fleet, is a Chicago-based band featuring members of The Lawrence Arms, The Arrivals, and Smoking Popes. Originally formed in 2009 by Isaac Thotz and Neil Hennessy, the two added Dave Merriman and Mike Oberlin and played a few shows as a four piece before adding Eli Caterer as a lead guitarist. Their sound has been influenced by bands of the ‘60s and ‘70s.

Treasure Fleet played The Fest in 2014 along with Paint It Black, The City on Film, and Iron Chic. The same year they played a four night stint with Alkaline Trio at Metro Chicago. They participated in Recess Records' 25th anniversary tour.

Their debut album, Cocamotion, was released in 2012. Their sophomore effort, Future Ways, was released later the same year. In 2015, they released The Sun Machine on Recess Records.

== Discography ==
- Cocamotion (2012)
- Future Ways (2012)
- The Sun Machine (2015)
- American Sunshine (2023)
