= Black robe =

Black robe, blackrobe or variant may refer to:

- Black Robes, the Jesuits (Society of Jesus)
- Black Robe, a 1985 historical novel by Brian Moore
- Black Robe (film), a 1991 historical film based on the Brian Moore novel
- The Black Robe, an 1881 epistolary novel by Wilkie Collins
- The Black Robe (film), a 1944 German film
- The Black Robe (TV series), a 1949 American television program
- Blackrobe, a book by Maurice Kenny
- Black Robe Regiment

== See also ==
- Black coat (disambiguation)
- Black (disambiguation)
- Robe (disambiguation)
- Cassocks, religious clothing, usually black for Catholic priests
- Court dress
