= Clann Zú =

Australian-Irish band

- Origin: Melbourne, Victoria, Australia
- Genres: Post-rock, folk rock, art rock
- Years active: 1999–2005
- Labels: Independent, Zahrada, G7 Welcoming Committee
- Spinoffs: My Disco
- Spinoff of: Non-Intentional Lifeform
- Past members: Benjamin Andrews; Declan de Barra; Nathan Greaves; Russell Fawcus; Pip Reid; Liam Andrews; Rohan Rebeiro; Lach Wooden

Clann Zú were an Australian-Irish band that formed in late 1999 in Melbourne. By early 2002 they had relocated to Dublin. The group issued two albums, Rua (2002) and Black Coats & Bandages (June 2004), before disbanding in May 2005.

== History ==
Clann Zú were formed in Melbourne in late 1999 by Benjamin Andrews on electric guitar, Declan de Barra on vocals and bodhrán, and Nathan Greaves on bass guitar – all from Non-Intentional Lifeform. They were soon joined by Russell Fawcus on electric violin and keyboards, and Pip Reid on drums and percussion. Clann Zú played "dramatic soundtrack quality" music with "a lush blend of dark and moving contemporary western sounds tinged with Middle Eastern and Irish melodies."

The forming members drew inspiration from an eclectic mix of musical styles, such as punk, rock, folk, electronic, and classical. Their fusion of Celtic folk, electronic music, and rock has created a unique epic soundscape full of powerful atmospheric sounds and off-beat instrumentation. Their songs are bilingual, utilising both Irish and English lyrics. In February 2000, they recorded a six-track extended play, Clann Zú, which was issued independently. Mediasearch's Carmine Pascuzzi felt that "Various styles epitomise their sound, from hip-hop to hard rock" and that they provided "a well-compiled collection that indicates potential for better things" with "de Barra, a charismatic frontman who sets a high standard for himself. He is intense and the vocals soar to good heights in the effort to impose himself on the audience."

In 2002 they released their first LP, Rua, on Zahrada Records. Jasper Lee of Oz Music Project described its "style ranges from hard edged post rock riffs into languished instrumental and folk/celtic interludes, no one could ever blame the band for every being boring... Whilst room for improvement is in order, it is unlikely that [they] have peaked yet, so anticipate to hear even bigger and better things from them soon." In July, they toured New South Wales to promote their single, "Choking on the Prize", which Christie Eliezer of Music & Media previewed: the group "plays a blend of alterno, folk and electronica."

During December 2001, Clann Zú relocated to Europe and early in the next year they moved to Dublin. The band signed to Winnipeg-based G7 Welcoming Committee Records, an independent record label, which re-issued, Rua, in September 2003. "Five Thousand More" was promoted via an animated music video created by de Barra, which was used for various festivals and online film and animation sites, including the 47th Cork International Film Festival. They subsequently released an animated video to accompany an Irish version of "Crashing to the Floor" in mid-2003. During 2003, My Disco was formed, initially as a side-project, in Melbourne by Benjamin Andrews on guitar; Liam Andrews on bass guitar and vocals; and Rohan Rebeiro on drums.

Clann Zú's second album, Black Coats & Bandages, was released in June 2004. The line-up for the album was Benjamin Andrews on guitar; Liam Andrews on bass guitar; de Barra on lead vocals; Fawcus on electric violin, piano and keyboard; Rebeiro on drums and percussion; and Lach Wooden on live sound manipulation and audio engineer. This saw a move away from the traditional Irish and folk influences which had characterised their first LP, Rua. Despite this stylistic departure they retained and indeed increased their use of the Irish language, with two songs ("T-éan Bán" and "An Deireadh Scéal") sung entirely in Irish.

Clann Zú released the following statement, announcing their break-up, on their website in May 2005: "Clann Zú regret to announce that it is no longer continuing to tour or record. Such is the life of a band. Benjamin and Liam will continue to tour and record with My Disco on the Crashing Jets label and Declan de Barra will continue with his own solo project." Russell Fawcus later joined The Black Hundred, with former members of Oneironaut, Season, and the Grand Silent System. In July 2010, the Black Hundred released their self-titled first album.

== Discography ==
=== Studio albums ===
- Rua (2002, Zahrada)
- Black Coats & Bandages (1 June 2004, G7 Welcoming Committee Records)

=== Extended plays ===
- Clann Zú (February 2000, self-released)
- Red-Emitting Light Organ (2003)

=== Singles ===
- "Choking on the Prize" (July 2000)

== Members ==
- Benjamin Andrews – electric guitar
- Russell Fawcus – electric violin, keyboard
- Declan de Barra – vocals, bodhrán
- Liam Andrews – bass guitar
- Pip Atherstone-Reid - drums
- Nathan Greeves - bass
- Lach Wooden – sound manipulation, engineer
