= The Crumbs =

- Origin: Miami, Florida, U.S.
- Genres: Rock and roll Southern rock Rockabilly; Punk rock pop-punk
- Years active: 1993–2010

The Crumbs are a rock band originating from Miami, Florida. The band is composed of Raf Classic (guitar/vocals), Johnny B (guitar), Emil 4 1/2 (bass), and Chuck Loose (drums).

They have been inspired by 1950s rock music and the music of The Ramones, The MC5, Crime, The Dead Boys, The Stooges, The Pagans, and other pre-1977 punk acts that paved the way for the Crumbs' sound.

Recess Records released the band's first EP in 1995 titled I Fell in Love With an Alien Girl and I Think I'm Goin' to Mars With Her. This was soon followed by the Far Out Records 10", Get All Tangled Up. The band signed with Lookout! Records, who released their 1996 EP Shakespeare and 1997 full-length self-titled album. Chuck Loose left the group in 1997 to focus on the Drug Czars, while his replacement, Grim, was swiped from fellow Miami-based punkers, the Basicks. Lookout Records released the Crumbs' second full album entitled Low and Behold in 1998.

== Discography ==
- 1995: I Fell in Love With an Alien Girl and I Think I'm Goin' to Mars With Her (Recess Records), four song EP
- 1995: Get All Tangled Up (Farout Records), 8 songs, 10 inch vinyl and CD, includes "Whatta they know" and "Iggy can't lose"
- 1996: Shakespeare (Lookout! Records), EP
- 1997: The Crumbs (Lookout! Records), 14 songs
- 1998: Low and Behold (Lookout! Records), 13 songs
- 2000: "Out of Range" (Recess Records)
- 2004: Last Exit (TKO Records)
- 2006: Hold That Shit Right (Recess Records), opens with five previously unreleased tracks, also includes the out of print Alien Girl and Get All Tangled Up EP's.
- 2008: Dade County Trash, 12 songs (Insubordination Records)
- 2009: split with The Ridicules, (It's Alive Records)
- 2009: Live from Baltimore, (Insubordination Records)
- 2010: Gator Kicks (Livid Records)
