= Audacity (band) =

American garage rock band

- Origin: Fullerton, California, United States
- Genres: Garage rock, punk rock
- Years active: 2001–present
- Label: Burger Records Suicide Squeeze Records Recess Records
- Members: Matt Schmalfeld; Kyle Gibson; Caleb Ploehn; Thomas Alvarez; Jon Raynes
- Past members: Cameron Crowe; Chuck Mordaunt; Cole Wilson; Mike Gonzales
- Website: audacityband.com

Audacity is an American garage rock band from Fullerton, California, United States.

== History ==
Audacity was formed in 2001, when members Kyle Gibson, Matt Schmalfeld, Cole Wilson, and Chuck Mordant were in 6th grade. In the band's early days, they played at their school carnival and at many house parties. The band won a local Battle of the Bands in their freshman year of high school, and organized a benefit concert for victims of Hurricane Katrina. Audacity released their debut full-length album, Power Drowning, in 2009 via Burger Records. They released their second full-length album, Mellow Cruisers, in 2012 via Burger Records and Recess Records. Their third album, Butter Knife, was released in 2013, and Hyper Vessels was released in 2016 via Suicide Squeeze Records.

Audacity proudly hails from Fullerton, California, home of The Adolescents, Social Distortion, Lit, and seminal punk band, The Middle Class. Audacity was named Best Punk Band in 2014 at the OC Music Awards, and band members Schmalfeld and Gibson were praised for their punker than punk acceptance speech.

Audacity has toured the US extensively and has also toured Europe and Japan. They also played in Tel Aviv in March 2017. They are known for their unique sound, which has been called Surf Punk, Punk Pop, Garage Slop, and Power Pop.

The band was scheduled to play a last show at Fullerton's Continental Room on October 29, 2017, but pulled out of the lineup. After a switch in their lineup, a Japan Tour took place in March 2019, and the band played Southern California shows during the early part of 2019. They are currently on hiatus, and working on new projects.

== Band members ==
- Matt Schmalfeld (Vocals, Lead Guitar)
- Kyle Gibson (Vocals, Guitar)
- Cole Wilson (Bass) Until 2004
- Chuck Mordaunt (Drums) Until 2005
- Cameron Crowe (Bass) Until 2015
- Mike Gonzalez (Bass) Until 2016
- Thomas Alvarez-Gray (Drums)
- Caleb Ploehn (Bass) Until 2019
- Jon Raynes (Guest Keyboard)

== Discography ==
Studio albums

- Hyper Vessels (2016)
- Butter Knife (2013)
- Mellow Cruisers (2012)
- Power Drowning (2009)

EPs

- Cold Rush (2014)
- Fun Spot (2014)
- Fullerton, California (2014)
- Counting The Days & Mind Your Own Business (2014)
- Juva Jive (2014)
- Finders Keepers (2013)
- Vape Victim (2011)
- Ears and Eyes (2010)
- Audacity (2009)
- The Anne Frank Tape (2008)
