= Today's Empires, Tomorrow's Ashes =

Studio album by Propagandhi
- Released: February 6, 2001
- Recorded: May–August 2000
- Studios: Motor (San Francisco); Mid-Can (Winnipeg)
- Genre: Melodic hardcore
- Length: 33:21
- Labels: G7 Welcoming Committee, Fat Wreck Chords
- Producer: Ryan Greene

Propagandhi chronology
Where Quantity Is Job #1 (1998)	Today's Empires, Tomorrow's Ashes (2001)	Potemkin City Limits (2005)

Professional ratings
Review scores
Source	Rating
AllMusic	4/5 stars
Drowned in Sound	6/10
Kerrang!	5/5 stars
Wall of Sound	84/100

Today's Empires, Tomorrow's Ashes is the third studio album by Canadian punk rock band Propagandhi, released February 6, 2001. It was released on the band's own G7 Welcoming Committee Records label in Canada and Fat Wreck Chords elsewhere. It is the first Propagandhi release of new material on their own label.

== Background ==
Recording sessions were delayed due to various issues, one of which was the band's practice space being flooded, and another being that drummer Jord Samolesky broke his foot playing hockey. Prior to recording in May 2000, the band announced that it would have 14 songs, and would be titled Today's Empires, Tomorrow's Ashes. Samolesky broke his foot again in June 2000 while riding motocross; recording continued into August.

== Composition ==
One of the album's tracks, "Back to the Motor League", indirectly refers to two songs by the Dead Kennedys, "Triumph of the Swill" and "Chickenshit Conformist", as well the year of their release on the 1986 album Bedtime for Democracy. The "Back to the Motor League" lyrics state: "fifteen years later it still reeks of swill and chickenshit conformists". Both the Dead Kennedys songs and the Propagandhi track concern the co-opting of punk ideology by the corporate record industry.

"Purina Hall of Fame" is a reference to the Nestlé owned pet food company, The Ralston Purina Company. The title is a cynical take on the Purina Animal Hall of Fame, a site that celebrates animals who have saved human lives. The lyrics of "Purina Hall of Fame" obliquely outline Propagandhi's concerns about animal cruelty.

== Cover art ==
The album art features the painting The Unfinished Flag of the United States by American poet Lawrence Ferlinghetti. Propagandhi continued this motif of using established artists to provide their cover artwork on their next two albums, Potemkin City Limits, using a piece by anarchist artist Eric Drooker, and Supporting Caste, which featured a painting entitled "The Triumph of Mischief" by Kent Monkman.

== Release ==
After initially being planned for released in October 2000, and then delayed to November due to bassist/vocalist Todd Kowalski and guitarist/vocalist Chris Hannah both losing their voices. The album was again delayed to early 2001, with the label citing "something to do with hockey and ice-fishing." "Back to the Motor League" was posted on G7 Welcoming Committee Records' website on November 10, 2000. Today's Empires, Tomorrow's Ashes was eventually released on February 6, 2001; G7 Welcoming Committee released it in Canada, and Fat Wreck Chords released it in the US. A release show was held at the University of Manitoba in Manitoba, Canada, on February 23, 2001. The band toured eastern Canada in April and May 2001, with Sixty Stories. In June and July, the band toured across Australia. In August and September, the band went on a tour of North America with Randy. Following the September 11 attacks, the remaining tour dates were cancelled.

== Legacy ==
The album was shortlisted for the Polaris Heritage Prize at the 2025 Polaris Music Prize.

== Track listing ==
No.	Title	Length
1.	"Mate Ka Moris Ukun Rasik An"	3:03
2.	"Fuck the Border"	1:31
3.	"Today's Empires, Tomorrow's Ashes"	2:37
4.	"Back to the Motor League"	2:40
5.	"Natural Disasters"	2:04
6.	"With Friends Like These Who the Fuck Needs COINTELPRO?"	3:23
7.	"Albright Monument, Baghdad"	2:27
8.	"Ordinary People Do Fucked-Up Things when Fucked-Up Things Become Ordinary"	2:17
9.	"Ladies' Nite in Loserville"	1:45
10.	"Ego Fum Papa (I Am the Pope)"	1:38
11.	"New Homes for Idle Hands"	1:44
12.	"Bullshit Politicians"	1:33
13.	"March of the Crabs"	1:56
14.	"Purina Hall of Fame"	4:43
Total length:		33:21

== Personnel ==
- Chris Hannah – guitar, vocals
- Jord Samolesky – drums
- Todd Kowalski – bass, vocals
