= Four Deadly Questions =

American band

Four Deadly Questions was an American band from Brooklyn, New York, made up of ex-members of Dick Army and Books Lie (who were signed to Level Plane). Most DIY bands and Recess Records affiliates utilize this band for setting up gigs in the New York City area as all members of this band have been in the punk scene for many years and have access to setting up shows for bands who would otherwise have no way of booking themselves at larger clubs.

== Discography ==
- Self-titled 7-inch EP - Geykido Comet Records 2004
- This Just In... Benefit For Indy Media - Geykido Comet Records 2005
- Split CD with The Answer Lies - Geykido Comet Records 2006
- Chemical X DVD music video compilation - Geykido Comet Records 2008

== Interesting fact ==
In the late 1990s, Recess Records put out a benefit CD (entitled 'Workers Comp') for Dawn (previous Four Deadly Questions singer) after she was assaulted in NYC one night and stabbed in the eye for all her money. Blag Dahlia produced and mastered the CD which featured bands such as Dillinger Four, Boris the Sprinkler, Dick Army (whose band members later went on to form Four Deadly Questions), and No Fraud among others.

== Band in the media ==
=== Maximum Rocknroll ===
Write up for debut ep: The songs on the A-side have a raucous yet melodic punk tinge, sort of like early Jawbreaker mixed with Against Me! The first song on the B-side, "Gotta Let it Go," however, rocks with more of a bootylicious swagger, and the boy-girl interplay is evocative of Cupid Car Club. "These Creeping Doubts" round off the fun in the style of the A-side tunes. I believe this is the first release from these Brooklynites and it hints at a bright future.

- (AM) MAXIMUMROCKNROLL, Issue No. 257, October 2004

=== Razorcake Magazine ===
Write up for debut ep: I can't say enough good things about Dick Army. Yeah, maybe they were just a cheap, goofy Black Flag knockoff, but damnit, they had that underdog charm and you've just gotta love that. Matt from Dick Army started this band, and to say that I was looking forward to it would be a huge understatement. It lived up to my expectations. Where Dick Army mostly played simple, sloppy three-chord punk, FOUR DEADLY QUESTIONS sound a lot more original and hard-to-pin-down. It's still fun and scrappy, to be sure, and it's not like they turned into Hawkwind or anything, but the choppy rhythms and female backups make this stand out a whole lot. Me likey.

- (Josh) Razorcake Issue No. 22, October/November 2004
