= Non-Intentional Lifeform =

Australian band

Non-Intentional Lifeform (N.I.L.)
- Origin: Perth, Australia
- Genres: Hard rock, heavy metal
- Years active: 1995–1998
- Labels: Roadrunner Records
- Members: Declan de Barra; Andrew Day; Adam Pedretti; Hywel Stoakes

Non-Intentional Lifeform or simply N.I.L. were an Australian band formed in 1995 and signed to Roadrunner Records. They had a minor Australian hit with their single "Living or Existing?", which appeared in the popular Australian television series Good Guys Bad Guys, among others. A video of 'Six O'clock Headshot' from Air Left Vacant appeared on Roadrunner Records 'Drilling The Vein' compilation video in 1996. Their album, Uisce, was released in 1997, and the band toured with Korn, Marilyn Manson, Kiss, Helmet, Dubwar, Grinspoon and Superheist, as well as playing shows with The Prodigy, Deftones, The Living End, Fear Factory, The Mark of Cain, Cosmic Psychos, The Avalanches, Shihad and Bodyjar. The band split up in 1998.

== Members ==
- Declan de Barra – vocals
- Andrew Day – guitar, vocals, trombone, mandolin, didgeridoo
- Hywel Stoakes – bass
- Adam Pedretti – drums

== After split ==
After the split, Adam Pedretti joined Killing Heidi. Declan de Barra played briefly with a completely new line-up and they released a single "Pathogen" before folding. De Barra then formed Clann Zu. Andrew Day went on to found the electronic project Nightswimmer and then the London UK based post-punk band The Sound Movement whose first album was released on Oxford label Truck Records.

== Discography ==
=== Albums ===
- Close Your Eyes and See What God Will Take From You (1995)
- Uisce (1997)

=== EPs ===
- Air Left Vacant (1996)
- Pathogen (1998)

=== Singles ===
- "Living or Existing?" (1997)
- "Sample of Semen" (1997)

== See also ==
- Lifeform (disambiguation)
