= Black Coats & Bandages =

Studio album by Clann Zú
- Released: 1 June 2004
- Recorded: Newmarket Studios (Melbourne)
- Genre: Art rock; slowcore
- Length: 46:52
- Label: G7 Welcoming Committee
- Producer: Clann Zú, Lach Wooden

Clann Zú chronology
Rua (2002)	Black Coats & Bandages (2004)

Black Coats & Bandages is the second full-length album by Irish-Australian band Clann Zú. This album has much sparser instrumentation and less electronic influence than Clann Zú's previous album, Rua, and a heavier use of the Irish language.

Black Coats & Bandages explores similar issues as Rua, but also touches on themes of imperialism, war, organized religion, and personal struggles.

== Reception ==
AllMusic's Stewart Mason expressed a difficulty in describing Black Coats & Bandages: "close to impossible to sum up in an easy sentence, because there are so many comparisons" and decided "[it] is undeniably flawed, and several listens will be necessary before it all begins to make some kind of sense, but as perhaps the most wide-ranging and eclectic band this side of Canada's Broken Social Scene, Clann Zu continue to impress." Adam White of Punknews.org compared it to the group's debut album Rua, and found that it "is completely raw, shockingly so. It's a record of mid to slow paced ballads, sparely arranged and sparsely produced. The prevailing theme in the title track (and the band's press) is 'funeral oration'." Maarten Schiethart of PennyBlackMusic noted that when "De Barra sings rather than whines, his voice shows a fine soulful style, yet when the preaching starts – Black Coats and Bandages is on G7 Welcoming Committee after all – the Clann Zú sound becomes pretty mundane".

== Track listing ==
All lyrics are written by Declan de Barra; all music is composed by Clann Zú

No.	Title	Length
1.	"Black Coats & Bandages"	1:38
2.	"There Will Be No Morning Copy"	6:18
3.	"So Complicated Was the Fall"	4:10
4.	"An T-Éan Bán"	4:30
5.	"One Bedroom Apartment"	6:35
6.	"From an Unholy Height"	6:14
7.	"Án Deireadh Scéal"	3:15
8.	"From Bethlehem to Jenin"	5:35
9.	"You'll Have to Swim"	6:07
10.	"A Sudden Intake of Breath"	2:33
Total length:		46:52

== Personnel ==
Clann Zú

- Declan de Barra – vocals, bodhrán, lyrics, artwork, production
- Liam Andrews – bass guitar, production
- Benjamin Andrews – guitars, production
- Rohan Rebeiro – drums, production
- Russell Fawcus – electric violin, piano, keyboards, production, mixing (track 9)

Additional personnel

- Lachlan McLean – saxophone (track 6)
- Ben Hurt – recording, mixing (track 1–8, 10)
- Lach Wooden – production, mixing (track 9)
