= Swallowing Shit =

Canadian musical group

- Origin: Winnipeg, Manitoba, Canada
- Genres: Grindcore, anarcho-punk, punk rock, powerviolence
- Years active: 1994–1997
- Label: G7 Welcoming Committee
- Past members: Mike Alexander; Cory Koss; Todd Kowalski; Brian Dobson; Mike Koop; Steve Dueck; Jahmeel Russell; Mark Nowak; Dean Bruce; Dave Daley

Swallowing Shit was a short-lived Canadian grindcore band formed in 1994 in Winnipeg, Manitoba, Canada.

== History ==
Swallowing Shit was formed in 1994 by vocalist Mike Alexander with guitarist Mike Koop of The Bonaduces, drummer Steve Dueck of The Undecided and, for one show only, bassist Dave Daley.

With Jahmeel Russell replacing Daley and Dean Bruce joining on second guitar, the band soon recorded and released a crude demo. Both Bruce and Koop left shortly thereafter, who would be replaced by guitarist Mark Nowek. Dueck then departed, being replaced by drummer Cory Koss. This lineup recorded a 7", the band's first proper release.

Shortly thereafter, Russel and Nowek left the band. This made way for what could be considered the "classic" lineup, featuring guitarist Todd Kowalski (ex-I Spy) and bassist Brian Dobson.

The band's was known for its aggressive, politically radical brand of punk.

The Alexander/Kowalski/Koss/Dobson lineup recorded an 11-song 7" on Spiral Objective Records from Australia, before disbanding in June 1997, playing their final show with J Church and The Weakerthans.

The band members subsequently moved on to other projects. Alexander would go on to play in Head Hits Concrete and currently Putrescence. Kowalski is a member of Propagandhi. Russell would also play in Malefaction, Kittens, Projektor, Hide Your Daughters and KEN mode. Koss was the drummer for Malefaction and is currently in the black metal band Of Human Bondage. Brian Dobson became an engineer and moved to Minneapolis.

An album, Anthology, was released in 2000 on G7 Welcoming Committee Records to compile the band's recorded singles. Their song "If Assholes Could Fly, This Place Would Be an Airport" is featured on G7's 2005 compilation Take Penacilin Now.

== Members ==
- Mike Alexander - vocals (1994–1997)
- Mike Koop - guitar (1994–1995)
- Dean Bruce - guitar (1995)
- Mark Nowak - guitar (1995–1996)
- Todd Kowalski - guitar (1996–1997)
- Dave Daley - bass (1994)
- Jahmeel Russell - bass (1994–1996)
- Brian Dobson - bass (1996–1997)
- Steve Dueck - drums (1994–1995)
- Cory Koss - drums (1995–1997)
