= Lifeform (disambiguation) =

A lifeform is a type of thing that is living or alive.

Lifeform or Lifeforms may also refer to:

- Life form (folk taxonomy), a second level of classification in the folk taxonomy
- Lifeforms (The Future Sound of London album)
  - "Lifeforms" (song), by the Future Sound of London from Lifeforms
- Lifeforms (Angels & Airwaves album)
- Lifeform (comics), a character in the Marvel Comics Universe
- Life Form (novel), a 2010 novel by Amélie Nothomb
- Plant life-form, systems for categorizing plants
  - Raunkiær plant life-form, a system for categorizing plants by Christen C. Raunkiær

== See also ==
- Carbon-based life
- Carbon Based Lifeforms, a Swedish music group
- Form of life
- Life
- List of life forms
- Non-Intentional Lifeform or N.I.L., an Australian band
- Organism
- Silicon-based life
