= Rua (Clann Zú album) =

Studio album by Clann Zú
- Released: 2002
- Recorded: 2001, Hothouse Studios, Melbourne
- Genre: Art rock, folk rock, electronic
- Length: 47:24
- Label: Zahrada Records
- Producer: Clann Zú

Clann Zú chronology
Clann Zú (2000)	Rua (2002)	Black Coats & Bandages (2004)

Rua is the first full-length album by Irish-Australian band Clann Zú. The album contains themes of resistance and desperation. The songs are sung mainly in English, though there is some use of Irish. The production gives the songs a heavily layered sound, with prominent use of violin tracks and Declan de Barra's emotive voice.

There is a video for the track "Five Thousand More" on the CD.

== Background ==
Clann Zú were formed in Melbourne in 1999 and released their debut album, Rua, with the line-up of Benjamin Andrews on electric guitar, Nathan Greaves on bass guitar, Declan de Barra on lead vocals and bodhrán, Russell Fawcus on electric violin and keyboards, and Lach Wooden as their engineer and providing sound manipulation. They relocated to continental Europe in December 2001 and then on to Dublin, Ireland in the following year.

== Reception ==
Stewart Mason of AllMusic reviewed Clann Zú's second album, Black Coats & Bandages (2004): he described Rua as a " head-spinning debut" and that both albums were "close to impossible to sum up in an easy sentence, because there are so many comparisons." Sputnikmusic's Tyler Munro summarised his review of Rua: the group "blurs the line between celtic/folk, indie rock and electronica almost flawlessly to create a unique, organic listening experience." Adam White of Punknews.org felt it was "a wonderfully original and inspired album" showing "an eclectic mix of styles, with a rhythm section firmly rooted in electronica, instrumentation from Irish folk music and dark melodies that call to mind Nick Cave & The Bad Seeds."

== Track listing ==
All lyrics are written by Declan de Barra; all music is composed by Clann Zú

No.	Title	Length
1.	"Words for Snow"	4:37
2.	"Five Thousand More"	4:14
3.	"Hope This Day"	3:17
4.	"All That You've Ever Known"	5:34
5.	"Everyday"	4:05
6.	"All the People Now"	6:31
7.	"Rí Rá"	3:22
8.	"Lights Below"	6:12
9.	"Crashing to the Floor"	2:44
10.	"You're Listening to a Dead Man Speak"	6:53
Total length:		47:24

== Personnel ==
Clann Zú

- Declan de Barra – vocals, bodhrán, lyrics, artwork, mixing, production
- Nathan Greaves – bass guitar, mixing, production
- Benjamin Andrews – guitars, mixing, production
- Pip Atherstone-Reid – drums, percussion, mixing, production
- Russell Fawcus – violin, keyboards, mixing, production

Additional personnel

- Craig Harnath – drum recording
