= Toys That Kill =

American punk rock band

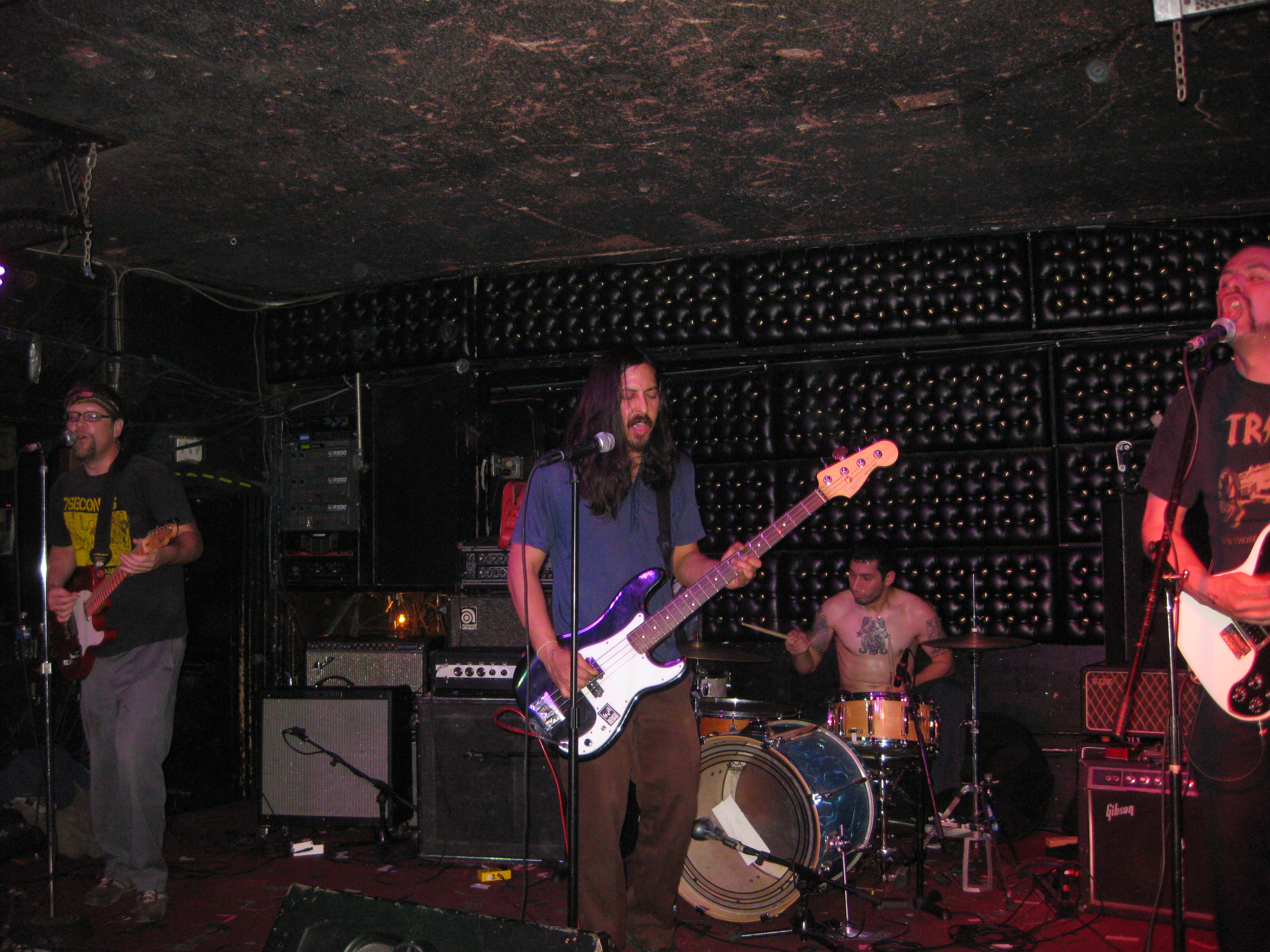
- Left to right: Congelliere, Ferrara, Felix, and Cole in 2012

Background information
- Origin: San Pedro, Los Angeles, California
- Genres: Punk rock
- Years active: 1999–present
- Labels: Recess, Geykido Comet, Dirtnap, Asian Man
- Spinoffs: Underground Railroad to Candyland
- Spinoff of: F.Y.P
- Members: Todd Congelliere; Sean Cole; Casey (Chachi) Ferrara; Jimmy Felix

Toys That Kill is a San Pedro-based punk rock band, formed from a previous incarnation known as F.Y.P. (1989–1999). Just after the release of the last F.Y.P. album, also titled Toys That Kill, Todd Congelliere and Sean Cole (vocalists/guitarists) along with new members Chachi Ferrara (bass) and Denis Fleps (drums) got together to form the new band.

They have toured Japan once, Europe twice and the U.S. once or twice a year since the year 2000. Congelliere, Ferrara, and Felix all play together in Underground Railroad to Candyland, another Recess Records act.

== Discography ==
=== Studio albums ===
- The Citizen Abortion LP/CD - 2001 Recess Records
- Control the Sun LP/CD - 2003 Recess Records
- Shanked LP/CD - 2006 Recess Records
- Fambly 42 LP/CD - 2012 Recess Records
- Sentimental Ward LP/CD - 2016 Recess Records
- Triple Sabotage LP/CD - 2026 Recess Records

=== EPs ===
- Razorcake Sister Series Vol. 1 7-inch - Razorcake Records
- Don't Take My Clone 7-inch - Dirtnap Records
- Flys 7-inch - Asian Man Records
- Fleshies/Toys That Kill split 7-inch picture disc - Geykido Comet Records
- Toys that Kill/Ragin Hormones split 7-inch - Stardumb Records (OUT OF PRINT)
- Joyce Manor/Toys That Kill split 7-inch - Recess Records

=== Compilations ===
- TRISKAIDEKAPHOBIA "A San Pedro Soundtrack" CD - Recess Records
- You Call This Music?! Volume 2 - Geykido Comet Records
- This Just In... Benefit For Indy Media - Geykido Comet Records
- God Save The Queers (A Tribute To The Queers)

=== Video/DVD ===
- THE RECESS VIDEO VHS/DVD
- Belt Fighting the Man (Rivethead, Dillinger Four, Toys That Kill live footage)
- Climb Up Music Video DVD Magazine
