= I Spy (band) =

Canadian hardcore punk band

- Also known as: Clump
- Origin: Regina, Saskatchewan, Canada
- Genres: Punk rock, hardcore punk, melodic hardcore
- Years active: 1991–1996
- Label: G7 Welcoming Committee
- Past members: Todd Kowalski; James Ash; Juan David Guerrero; Jeromy Van Dusen; Sean Talarico
- Website: www.myspace.com/ispyofficial

I Spy was a Canadian hardcore punk band founded in Regina, Saskatchewan, in 1991, relocated to Winnipeg, Manitoba, in 1994, and disbanded in 1996. Combining childish humour and politically oriented emotive hardcore, the group released several records on Recess Records and toured internationally. Front man Todd Kowalski later joined Propagandhi.

== History ==
=== Career ===
Originally called Clump (alternately Klump), the band was composed of lead singer and guitarist Todd Kowalski ("Todd the Rod"), lead guitarist Jeromy Van Dusen ("Rary"), bass guitarist Juan David Guerrero ("Guido" or "Olive") and drummer James Ash ("Jimmy Juice Pig"). With a blend of childish humour and serious, radical left wing political subject matter, the band garnered a following in the Canadian punk rock scene behind several releases on Recess Records and extensive touring.

In 1994, the band released a split 10" record, I'd Rather Be Flag-Burning, with fellow Winnipeg band Propagandhi, and the two bands toured together throughout western Canada that year. Later in 1994, the band toured independently throughout the Midwestern United States. In 1995, they toured the western United States, western Canada and Europe. Van Dusen left the band in 1995 after the band's European tour, reducing them to a three-piece in their latter days. The final line-up had bass guitarist Sean Talarico replacing Guerrero, who moved back to Regina.

=== Post-breakup ===
G7 Welcoming Committee Records released the band's complete discography on a single CD, Perversity Is Spreading... It's About Time!. This packaged all of their released material with bonus tracks, including cover versions of songs by Diana Ross and Youth of Today. Kowalski joined Propagandhi in 1997 after the departure of bass guitarist John K. Samson, who left to form The Weakerthans. Propagandhi's 2001 album. Today's Empires, Tomorrow's Ashes. includes their version of an unreleased I Spy song, "Fuck the Border". Kowalski also played in the grindcore band Swallowing Shit.

In 2002, the original four members reunited in Propagandhi singer Chris Hannah's basement studio to re-record their version of Diana Ross's "When We Grow Up" for the Somebody Needs a Timeout compilation album released by Campfire Records.

== Band members ==
- Todd Kowalski – vocals, guitar (1991–1996)
- James Ash – drums, vocals (1991–1996)
- Juan David Guerrero – bass guitar (1991–1995)
- Jeromy Van Dusen – guitar (1991–1995)
- Sean Talarico – bass guitar (1995–1996)

== Discography ==
- Four-song demo cassette (1993: self-released)
- I'd Rather Be Flag-Burning (1994: split 10"/CD with Propagandhi, Recess Records/G7 Welcoming Committee Records)
- Revenge of the Little Shits (1995: 10"/CD, Recess Records)
- Split 7" with ...But Alive (1995: 7")
- Perversity Is Spreading ...It's About Time!!! (1998: complete discography, CD/LP, G7 Welcoming Committee Records)

I Spy has also contributed songs to numerous compilation albums.
