= How to Clean a Couple o' Things =

EP by Propagandhi
- Released: 1993
- Recorded: 1993
- Genre: Punk rock, melodic hardcore
- Length: 5:00
- Label: Fat Wreck Chords

Propagandhi chronology
How to Clean Everything (1993)	How to Clean a Couple o' Things (1993)	Where Quality Is Job #1 (1994)

How to Clean a Couple o' Things is a 7" EP released by Canadian punk band Propagandhi in 1993 alongside their debut album, How to Clean Everything. The artwork consisted of photos and text stuck over the NOFX release The P.M.R.C. Can Suck on This! NOFX later used the already-layered artwork for their Fuck the Kids EP, and added a few more things to it.

== Track listing ==
1. "Pigs Will Pay"
2. "Stick the Fucking Flag Up Your Goddam Ass, You Sonofabitch"
