= Failed States (album) =

Studio album by Propagandhi
- Released: September 4, 2012
- Studio: Private Ear Recording and Illegal Combatant, Winnipeg
- Genre: Melodic hardcore
- Length: 38:20
- Label: Epitaph
- Producer: John Paul Peters

Propagandhi chronology
Supporting Caste (2009)	Failed States (2012)	Victory Lap (2017)

Professional ratings
Review scores
Source	Rating
Thrash Hits	4/6 stars
AbsolutePunk	(90/100)
Sputnikmusic	4.0/5 stars
Allmusic	4.0/5 stars

Failed States is the sixth studio album by the Canadian punk rock band Propagandhi. It was released on September 4, 2012, receiving critical praise.

A remastered version was released through multiple digital streaming services on February 1, 2019, as Chris Hannah felt that the original version sounded inferior to the quality of Supporting Caste and Victory Lap.

== Track listing ==
All music is composed by Propagandhi

No.	Title	Length
1.	"Note to Self"	5:56
2.	"Failed States"	1:54
3.	"Devil's Creek"	2:32
4.	"Rattan Cane"	3:06
5.	"Hadron Collision"	1:37
6.	"Status Update"	1:05
7.	"Cognitive Suicide"	3:42
8.	"Things I Like"	1:59
9.	"Unscripted Moment"	4:10
10.	"Dark Matters"	3:16
11.	"Lotus Gait"	3:15
12.	"Duplicate Keys Icaro (An Interim Report)"	4:34
Total length:		37:06

Bonus tracks
No.	Title	Length
13.	"The Fucking Rich Fuck the Poor"	1:19
14.	"The Days You Hate Yourself"	1:57
15.	"Failed States (Experimental Prototype)"	1:59

== Critical and commercial reception ==
The album debuted at number 1 on the Heatseekers chart for one week, and number 107 on the Billboard 200 with first-week sales of 3,500 copies.

== Personnel ==
Propagandhi

- Chris Hannah – guitar, vocals
- Jord Samolesky – drums
- Todd Kowalski – bass guitar, vocals
- David Guillas – guitar

Artwork

- Cover painting by Todd Kowalski
- Booklet cover painting by Charlie Immer
- Challenger explosion photo by NASA
- Band photo by Mandy Malazdrewich
- Layout by Derek Hogue/Amphibian

Production

- John Paul Peters – producer, engineer
- Troy Glessner – mastering
