= Hiretsukan =

- Michelle Proffit (vocals), with setlist written on her hand.

Background information
- Origin: Washington, D.C., U.S.
- Genres: Melodic hardcore, Screamo
- Years active: 2000 - 2002, 2002–2005
- Labels: G7 Welcoming Committee
- Members: Michelle Proffit; Dave Sanders (musician); Derek Wimble; Justin Williams (musician)
- Website: Official Site

Hiretsukan (from the Japanese: 卑劣漢 meaning "vicious man" or "despicable person") was an American, New York-based band, that formed in 1998 just outside Washington, D.C., United States. In the following years, they recorded their "Brown Bag" demo, and went out on a few small tours. After a few volatile years which saw several collective moves and incarnations, the group solidified its line-up and relocated to New York City.

The current line-up includes Michelle Proffit (vocals), Dave Sanders (guitar, backing vocals), Derek Wimble (bass), and Justin Williams (drums). The band performs a form of hardcore punk, incorporating melodic indie rock style riffs, often in 6/8 time. Michelle Proffit's vocal style consists mostly of screaming and screeching the lyrics. The lyrics lean towards the left-wing side of the political scale.

The band recorded its first EP in early 2002 with producer Don Fury. The result, Invasive/Exotic, was released on G7 Welcoming Committee Records in May, 2002. After touring a bit for the record, the band split up that same year. The members were convinced to re-form in late 2003 by the people at G7 Records.

Newly reformed with the same lineup, the band began working on songs that would eventually be recorded and released their first full-length album, End States (2005), again on G7 Welcoming Committee Records.

== Discography ==
=== EPs ===
- Invasive//Exotic (G7 Welcoming Committee Records, 2002)

=== LPs ===
- End States (G7 Welcoming Committee Records, 2005)

=== Compilations ===
- Take Penacilin Now (G7 Welcoming Committee Records, 2006)
