= Propagandhi =

Canadian punk band

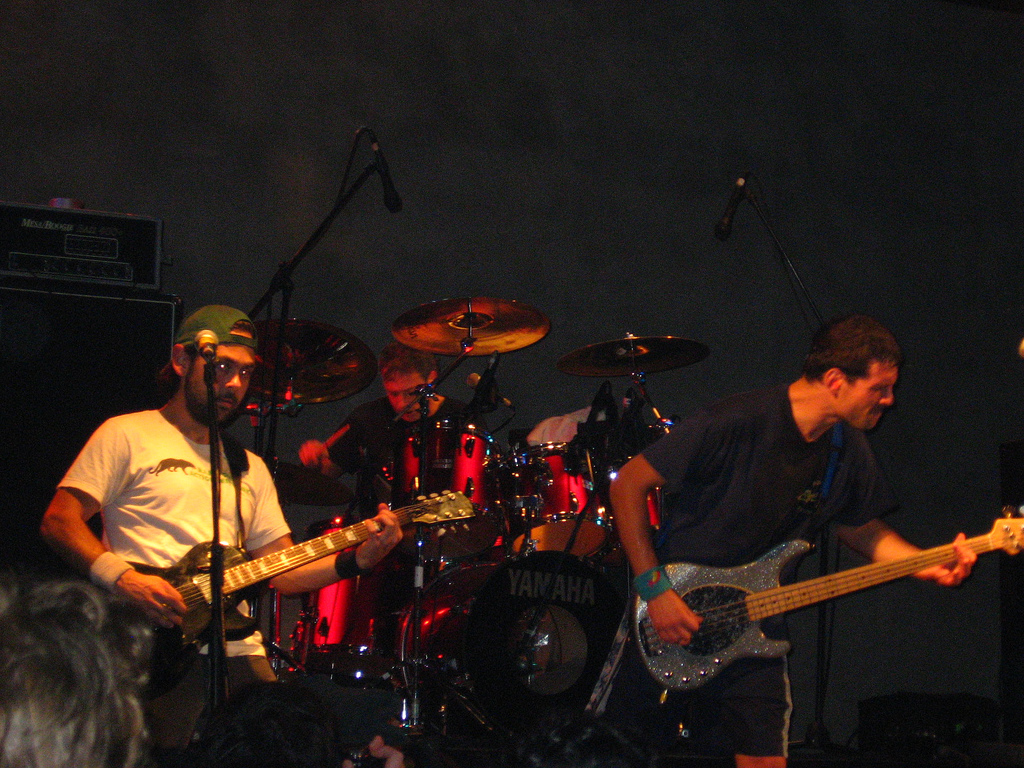
- Propagandhi (from left to right: David "The Beaver" Guillas, Jord Samolesky, Todd Kowalski) performing at Galpón Víctor Jara in Santiago, Chile, 2007

Background information
- Origin: Portage la Prairie, Manitoba, Canada
- Genres: Melodic hardcore; heavy metal; skate punk (early)
- Years active: 1986–present
- Labels: G7 Welcoming Committee; Fat Wreck Chords; Smallman; Grand Hotel van Cleef; Recess; Epitaph
- Members: Jord Samolesky; Chris Hannah; Todd Kowalski; Sulynn Hago
- Past members: Scott Hopper; Mike Braumeister; John K. Samson; David Guillas
- Website: propagandhi.com

Propagandhi is a Canadian punk rock and hardcore band formed in Portage la Prairie, Manitoba, in 1986 by guitarist Chris Hannah and drummer Jord Samolesky. The band is currently located in Winnipeg, Manitoba, and completed by bassist Todd Kowalski and guitarist Sulynn Hago.

== History ==
=== Formation, first two records (1986–1997) ===
In 1986, Samolesky and Hannah recruited original bassist Scott Hopper via a "progressive thrash band looking for bass player" flyer posted in a local record shop. Hopper was replaced three years later by Mike Braumeister, which completed the first lineup to perform live. After the band established itself through several demos and larger shows, including one with Fugazi, Braumeister moved to Vancouver, and John K. Samson became the band's third bassist.

In 1992, Propagandhi played a show with the California punk rock band NOFX and included in their set a cover version of Cheap Trick's "I Want You to Want Me". Impressed by their performance, NOFX bandleader Fat Mike signed them to his independent record label Fat Wreck Chords. The group accompanied him to Los Angeles, where they recorded their debut album, How to Clean Everything, released in 1993. They spent the next three years touring and issuing several limited-run releases, including the How to Clean a Couple o' Things single on Fat Wreck Chords, a split 10-inch record with I Spy, a split 7-inch with F.Y.P, and the double 7-inch Where Quality is Job #1, the latter three on Recess Records.

In 1996, they recorded and released their second album, Less Talk, More Rock, via Fat Wreck Chords. The title was ironic, as they had become well known for lengthy song explanations and speeches during live performances. The album was more politicized than its predecessor, with such song titles as "Apparently, I'm a 'P.C. Fascist' (Because I Care About Both Human and Non-Human Animals)", "Nailing Descartes to the Wall/(Liquid) Meat Is Still Murder", and "... And We Thought Nation-States Were a Bad Idea". Ramsey Kanaan, the founder of the anarchist publishing company AK Press, appears on "A Public Dis-Service Announcement from Shell" as the voice of the petroleum multinational. Partial proceeds of the album were donated to AK and other activist groups. Less Talk, More Rock caused some controversy at the time of its release due to the band's pro feminism and "gay positive" stance, which, according to Hannah, clashed with the sexist and homophobic culture of the West Coast punk rock scene with which the band had become associated.

=== Today's Empires, Tomorrow's Ashes (1997–2005) ===
After Less Talk, More Rock's release, Samson departed and formed The Weakerthans. Hannah's then-roommate Todd Kowalski, formerly of Propagandhi's touring mates I Spy and the political grindcore band Swallowing Shit, replaced him. Hannah and Samolesky also founded the record label G7 Welcoming Committee Records, which also released The Weakerthans' first album. The label structured itself around the participatory economic proposals of Robin Hahnel and Michael Albert. The band issued Where Quantity Is Job #1, a collection of EP and compilation tracks, demos, and live songs.

In 2001, Propagandhi released their third album, Today's Empires, Tomorrow's Ashes. The album was considered by some to be a major departure from their previous works. The song titles and lyrics of Today's Empires, Tomorrow's Ashes furthered the sphere of their political views, bolstered by the addition of Kowalski's aggressive songwriting and an increased density of guitar lines. The album includes enhanced content, with political videos and essays concerning such topics as COINTELPRO and the Black Panther Party.

=== Potemkin City Limits, expansion to four-piece (2005–2008) ===
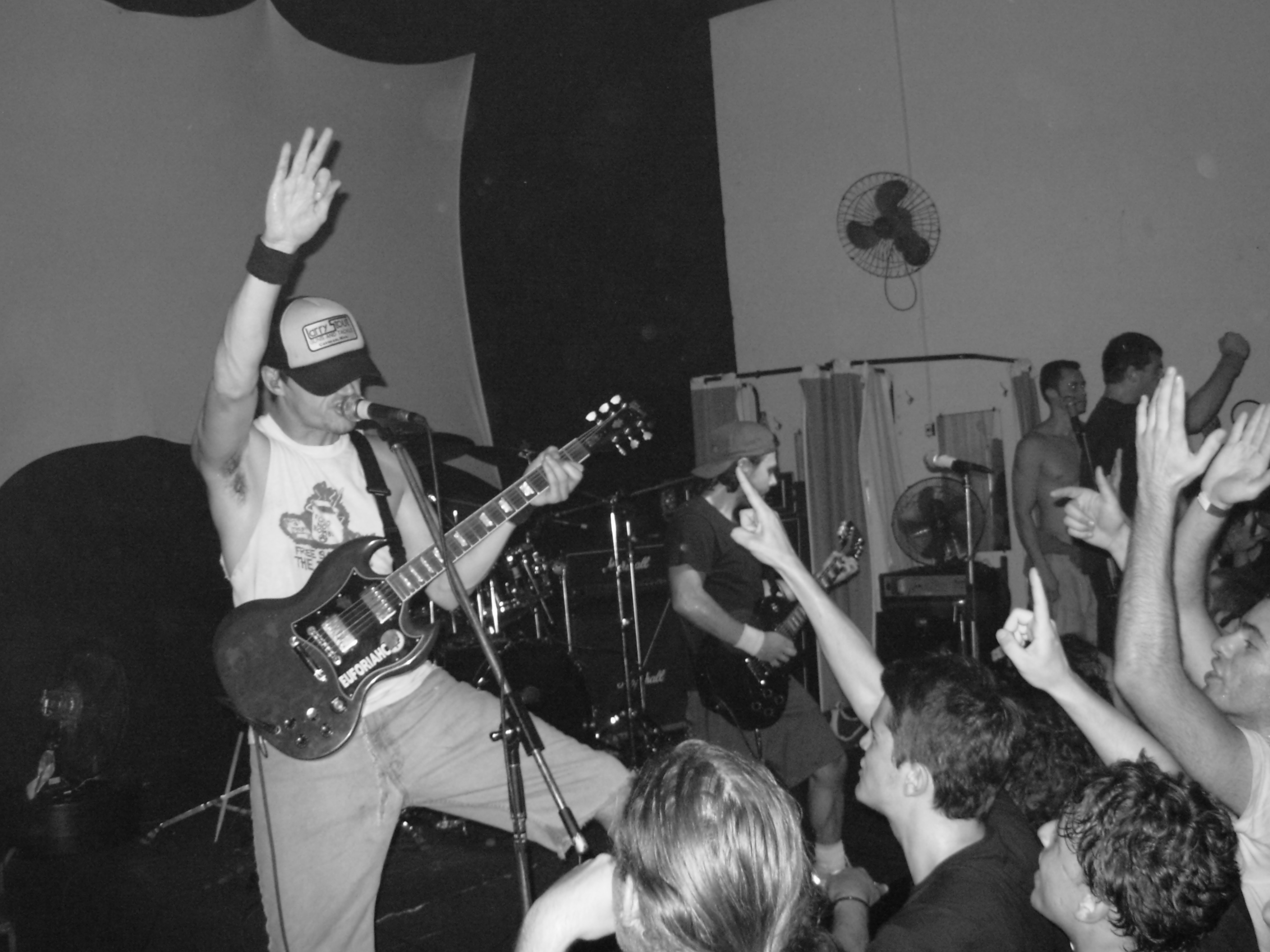
Propagandhi performing in Brazil in 2007

Propagandhi released the album Potemkin City Limits on October 18, 2005. Like its predecessor, the album features multimedia content, with a number of PDF files on topics such as participatory economics and veganism, and links to websites of organizations that Propagandhi support. The album's opening track, "A Speculative Fiction", won the 2006 SOCAN Songwriting Prize by online vote. Propagandhi pledged to use the $5000 prize to make donations to the Haiti Action Network and The Welcome Place, an organization in Winnipeg for which they'd previously done volunteer work which helps refugees start new lives in Manitoba.

Hannah briefly adopted the pseudonym Glen Lambert in the run-up to and immediate aftermath of the release of Potemkin City Limits, causing confusion among some fans, reviewers, and commentators; the band concluded the prank by announcing on August 14, 2006, that Glen Lambert had been dismissed and would be replaced by "former" member Chris Hannah. This coincided with the addition of second guitarist David Guillas, marking the band's first four-piece lineup in their then-twenty year career. Guillas, nicknamed "The Beaver", was a former member of two Winnipeg-based rock outfits, Giant Sons and Rough Music. Hannah had previously stated that he had been a fan of, and influenced by, Guillas' work in Giant Sons.

In 2007, the band released a DVD entitled Live from Occupied Territory, which features a recording of their set at The Zoo in Winnipeg on July 19, 2003. Proceeds of the DVD benefit the Grassy Narrows road blockade and the Middle East Children's Alliance. Included on the DVD are two full-length documentaries: Peace, Propaganda and the Promised Land, and As Long as the Rivers Flow.

=== Supporting Caste, Failed States (2008–2015) ===
The band spent the following years working on their fifth record, Supporting Caste. During the recording sessions, Hannah stated that to his ears the record "resemble[d] a nuclear-powered space-age composite of Potemkin City Limits, Less Talk More Rock, Giant Son's Anthology and a carefully measured dose of Today's Empires Tomorrow's Ashes". The band created a web page giving fans an option to receive two high-quality songs from the album before its release by donating $1 to $10 to one of three activist organizations which they supported. The page also linked to various pre-orders of the album. It was officially released on March 10, 2009.

The digital Recovered EP followed on April 6, 2010. It featured old recordings from the How To Clean Everything and Less Talk, More Rock eras, remastered and with new parts recorded by Hannah. A split 7-inch with Sacrifice followed that December, featuring Propagandhi covering Corrosion of Conformity. In collaboration with their friends and fellow musicians from Sheet Happens Publishing and Protest the Hero, Propagandhi also released a tablature transcription of Supporting Caste for guitar and bass in early 2012.

The group began plans for a new record shortly after completing Supporting Caste. After several years' work and pre-release snippets offered through various Internet outlets, Failed States, their sixth studio album, was released on September 4, 2012, through Epitaph Records. Early reviews were generally positive: Revolver praised the record's musical and lyrical accomplishment, while Exclaim! identified its improvements upon the standards set by the band's recent work. In October 2012, the release of the Failed States tab book was announced.

=== Victory Lap (2015–2025) ===
David Guillas has not been part of the touring lineup as of September 2015. The band added Floridian musician, Sulynn Hago, as their touring guitarist. On May 10, 2017, the band announced on their Facebook page that a new studio album had been recorded; the new album, Victory Lap, was released on September 29 through Epitaph Records. On the album, Sulynn Hago was credited as a band member and David Guillas a "Propagandhi alumnus" who had contributed additional guitar parts.

=== At Peace (2025–present) ===
On March 10, 2025, the band announced that their new album, At Peace, would be released on May 2 through Epitaph Records. The announcement was followed by the release of the title track.

The album was longlisted for the 2026 Polaris Music Prize.

== Musical style ==
While their earlier work was aligned with the punk rock and skate punk tradition, in later years Propagandhi records have moved towards a heavier and more technical heavy metal and thrash-influenced sound. Both in their lyrics and hands-on activism, the band's members champion various left wing and anarchist causes and veganism, and have taken a vocal stance against human rights violations, sexism, racism, nationalism, homophobia, imperialism, capitalism, and organized religion.

== Members ==
Current members

- Chris Hannah – lead and backing vocals, guitar (1986–present)
- Jord Samolesky – drums, backing vocals (1986–present)
- Todd Kowalski – bass, backing and lead vocals (1997–present)
- Sulynn Hago – guitar, backing vocals (2015–present)

Former members

- Scott Hopper – bass, backing vocals (1986–1989)
- Mike Braumeister – bass (1989–1991)
- John K. Samson – bass, backing and lead vocals (1991–1997)
- David Guillas – guitar (2006–2015)

== Discography ==
- How to Clean Everything (1993)
- Less Talk, More Rock (1996)
- Today's Empires, Tomorrow's Ashes (2001)
- Potemkin City Limits (2005)
- Supporting Caste (2009)
- Failed States (2012)
- Victory Lap (2017)
- At Peace (2025)

== See also ==
- Animal rights and punk subculture
