= Sacrifice (band) =

Canadian thrash metal band

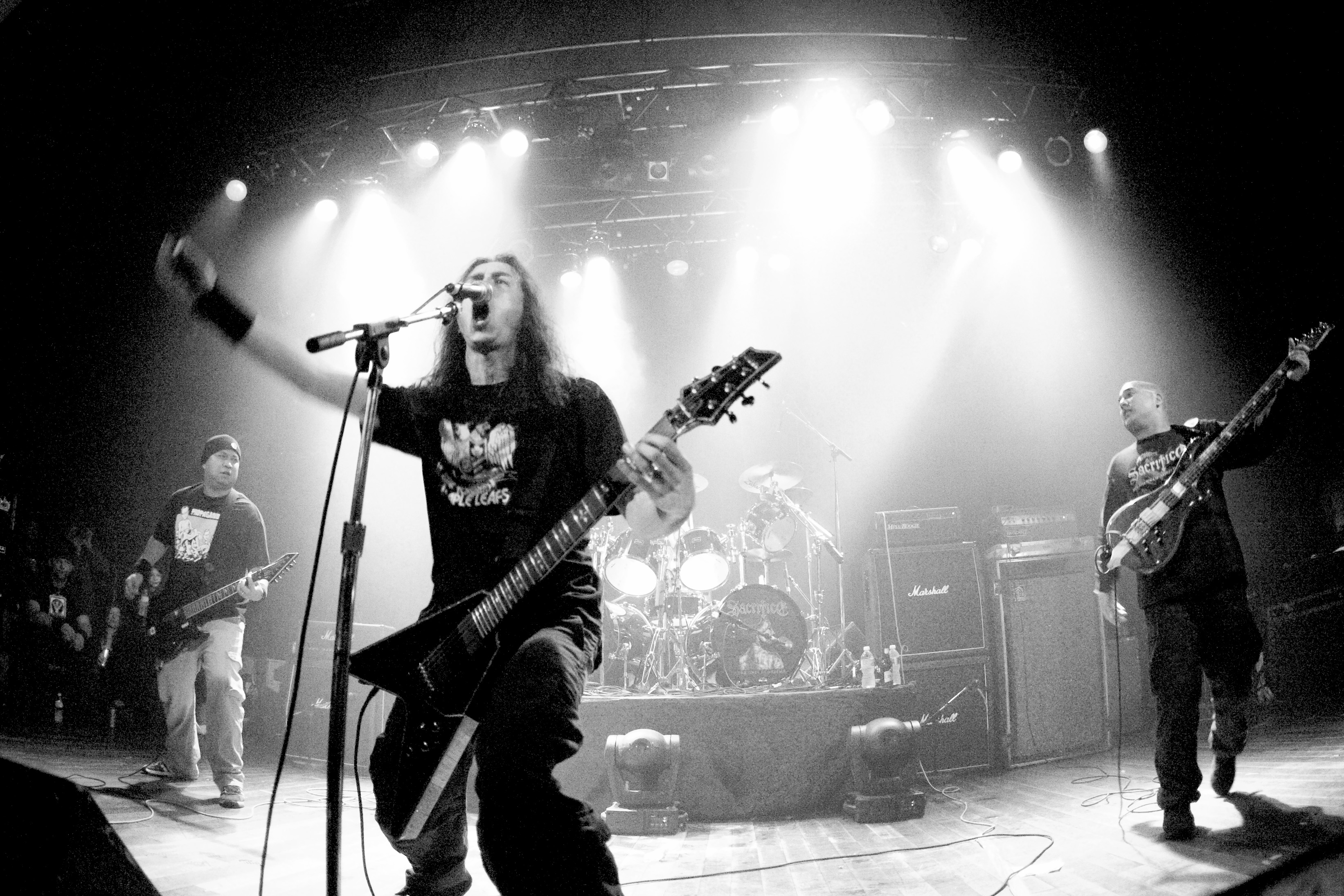
- Sacrifice live in Toronto, 2009

Background information
- Origin: Toronto, Ontario, Canada
- Genre: Thrash metal
- Years active: 1983–1993, 2006–present
- Labels: Diabolic Force, Metal Blade, Marquee
- Members: Rob Urbinati; Joe Rico; Scott Watts; Gus Pynn
- Past members: John Baldi; Craig Boyle; Ernst Flach; Mike Rosenthal; Kevin Wimberley
- Website: sacrifice.com.br

Sacrifice is a Canadian thrash metal band from Toronto, Ontario. Guitarists Rob Urbinati and Joe Rico formed the band in 1983.

The band released four studio albums before breaking up in 1993. After reuniting to play a concert in 2006, they released their fifth studio album, The Ones I Condemn, on Brazilian label Marquee Records in 2009. Despite numerous line-up changes, especially early on, Urbinati, Rico, and bassist Scott Watts recorded every studio album and demo with drummer Gus Pynn, except the Apocalypse Inside demo and CD.

== History ==
=== Formation and first four albums ===
Guitarists Rob Urbinati and Joe Rico formed a metal band in 1983, playing cover versions of their favourite songs. They recruited bassist Scott Watts and drummer Andrew Banks, whom Craig Boyle replaced. Singer John Baldi joined the band. They recorded a pair of rehearsal tapes featuring their first original song, "Turn in Your Grave", along with covers of Black Sabbath, Metallica, and Judas Priest.

By early 1985, the band moved towards a heavier and faster direction with Urbinati on vocals. Baldi and Boyle left the band over creative differences. Ernst Flach filled the vacant drummer position for a few live shows before leaving, as his drumming did not fit the pace the band wanted. Gus Pynn joined as a permanent drummer. Local record store employee Brian Taylor financed Sacrifice and Slaughter demos in exchange for the profits made from selling the tapes at his shop. Sacrifice released The Exorcism demo featuring new original songs. Later that year, Sacrifice opened a show in Toronto for Exodus, who were on their first North American tour. Sacrifice credits the growth of their band and the Toronto underground metal scene to appearing on this show. The band signed with Diabolic Force. In the fall of 1985, the band entered the Future Sound studio to record the debut album Torment in Fire. The album was released in 1986 in Canada on Diabolic Force, on Metal Blade Records in the United States, and on Roadrunner Records in Europe. By the time the album was released, the band worked on new material. In July 1986, the band recorded another demo in the Open Sound Studio. This was followed by an appearance in Kitchener, Ontario, with Megadeth as the opening act for King Diamond. In September, they played in Quebec City and the No Speed Limit Festival at the Spectrum in Montreal together with Possessed, Voivod, D.R.I. and Agnostic Front. In November 1986, Sacrifice opened up for Slayer on their Reign in Blood tour at the Concert Hall in Toronto.

In January 1987, the first appearances outside Canada occurred with concerts in Detroit and Chicago. There followed further appearances in Canada until April 1987. The Band then entered Grant Avenue Studio in Hamilton, to record the album Forward to Termination. It was released again on Diabolic Force, Metal Blade and Roadrunner Records for the US and Europe. A music video for the song "Re-Animation" was also filmed. These were followed by an appearance at the Milwaukee Metal Festival in July 1987 along with bands such as Death Angel, Trouble and King Diamond. In November 1987, they played with Nuclear Assault. Appearances in Ottawa, Quebec City and Montreal followed in December.

In December 1988, the band went into the Studio to record a new demo; Bassist Scott Watts played the electric guitar on a couple of out-take songs. A few days later Sacrifice performed as opening act along with the Goo Goo Dolls for Motörhead in Buffalo and Rochester. In 1989, the band recorded another demo. A few months later the band entered Phase One Studios in Toronto to record another album. It was produced by Joe Primeau and Brian Taylor. Again released on Diabolic Force, the album was titled Soldiers of Misfortune. The album was released in 1990 in Canada, and on March 5, 1991, in the United States. They also released a video for the album's title track. Towards the end of the year a tour followed with Razor. Drummer Gus Pynn left the band and was replaced by Mike Rosenthal, formerly of Dark Legion. In 1991, the band toured the U.S with British band Bolt Thrower and American thrash band Believer.

In 1993, Sacrifice went back to Phase One Studios to record the album Apocalypse Inside which was released on June 15, 1993, on Metal Blade records. It was co-produced by Dave Carlo (guitarist with Razor). During that summer bassist Scott Watts parted ways with the band and was replaced by Kevin Wimberley. After a tour of the United States in the same year in which the band supported Death, Sacrifice called it quits.

Urbinati went on to form Interzone (with Wimberley), Tenet (in 2002), and War Amp (in 2005). In 2004, Brazilian record label Marquee reissued the band's first 3 albums on CD.

Although the band faced numerous line-up changes, especially in their early days, founding guitarists Urbinati and Rico and bassist Scott Watts recorded every studio album and demo and drummer Gus Pynn played on everything but the Apocalypse Inside demo and CD.

=== Reunion ===
In 2006, the band reunited and performed in Toronto at the 'Day of the Equinox II' festival, their reunion show of which a DVD, Live Reanimation, was planned but not released yet. Also in August 2006, they released a compilation, 198666, and it has the three demo's and live track's from early years.

In 2008, they entered Rouge Valley Studio in Toronto to record the album The Ones I Condemn, released on July 6, 2009, by Marquee Records from Brazil.

In late 2010, Sacrifice teamed up with punk rock band Propagandhi to release a 7-inch single where both bands perform cover tunes. Propagandi covered Corrosion of Conformity's hardcore/metal crossover "Technocracy" and Sacrifice covered Rush's "Anthem". The cover of "Anthem" was included as a bonus track on the Canadian issue of The Ones I Condemn.

On April 29, 2011, Sacrifice finally made it across the Atlantic to play their first show on European soil in Germany at the Keep It True Festival.

In February 2012, Sacrifice crossed the Pacific to play in Osaka, Japan, headlining the two-day True Thrash Festival.

Sacrifice also played shows in western Canada. The original and current line-up played April 17, 2015, in Vancouver at the Rickshaw Theatre and on April 18, 2015, in the Manitoba Metalfest at The Park Theatre in Winnipeg.

Sacrifice headlined the 20th anniversary show of Inertia Entertainment on February 27, 2016, at The Opera House in Toronto.

By 2016, Sacrifice had been working on new material for the follow-up to The Ones I Condemn. There had been no news about new music from the band until December 2020, when they released a demo version of their first song in over a decade on YouTube, titled "World War V", which is expected to appear on the band's upcoming sixth studio album. Progress on the album had continued to be slow by April 2022, when bassist Scott Watts said on Facebook, "I guarantee you that we don't have a label, so there is no rush to record." Drummer Gus Pynn posted an update on the album in August 2023 on Sacrifice's Facebook page, saying they were at their "last practice" preparing new material and suggesting a release date of 2024. Work on the album was finished in April 2024, and a month later, guitarist and vocalist Rob Urbinati revealed Volume Six as its working title and it was announced that it would be released later in 2024 or 2025. Volume Six was later confirmed to be the album's official title, and it was released on February 21, 2025. The album was the album of the month at Metallian.

== Legacy and influence ==
Sacrifice played a prominent role in the 1980s underground metal scene in Toronto, and along with Voivod, Razor and Annihilator, they are referred to as one of the "Big Four" of Canadian thrash metal. AllMusic called Sacrifice "one of Canada's first, and arguably all around best, pure thrash metal bands."

Sacrifice has been cited as an influence on many notable heavy metal bands, including Sepultura, Cannibal Corpse, and Carcass.

== Band members ==
=== Current ===
- Rob Urbinati − vocals, guitars (1983–1993, 2006–present)
- Joe Rico − guitars (1983–1993, 2006–present)
- Scott Watts − bass (1983–1993, 2006–present)
- Gus Pynn − drums (1985–1990, 2006–present)

=== Former ===
- Andrew Banks – drums (1983)
- John Baldi − vocals (1983–1985)
- Craig Boyle − drums (1983–1985)
- Ernst Flach − drums (1985)
- Mike Rosenthal − drums (1990–1993)
- Kevin Wimberley − bass (1993)

Timeline

== Discography ==
=== Albums ===
- Torment in Fire (1986), Diabolic Force/Metal Blade/Roadrunner
- Forward to Termination (1987), Diabolic Force/Metal Blade/Roadrunner/Restless
- Soldiers of Misfortune (1990), Fringe Product – also, Metal Blade
- Apocalypse Inside (1993), Metal Blade
- The Ones I Condemn (2009), Marquee Records Brazil – Sonic Unyon/War on Music/Cyclone Empire
- Volume Six (2025), Cursed Blessings Records

=== Compilation ===
- 198666 (2006), War on Music – limited edition red double vinyl

=== Singles ===
- "Anthem" (2010), War on Music – limited edition split single with Propagandhi
- "World War V" (2021), Cursed Blessings Records
