= Greg MacPherson =

Canadian singer-songwriter

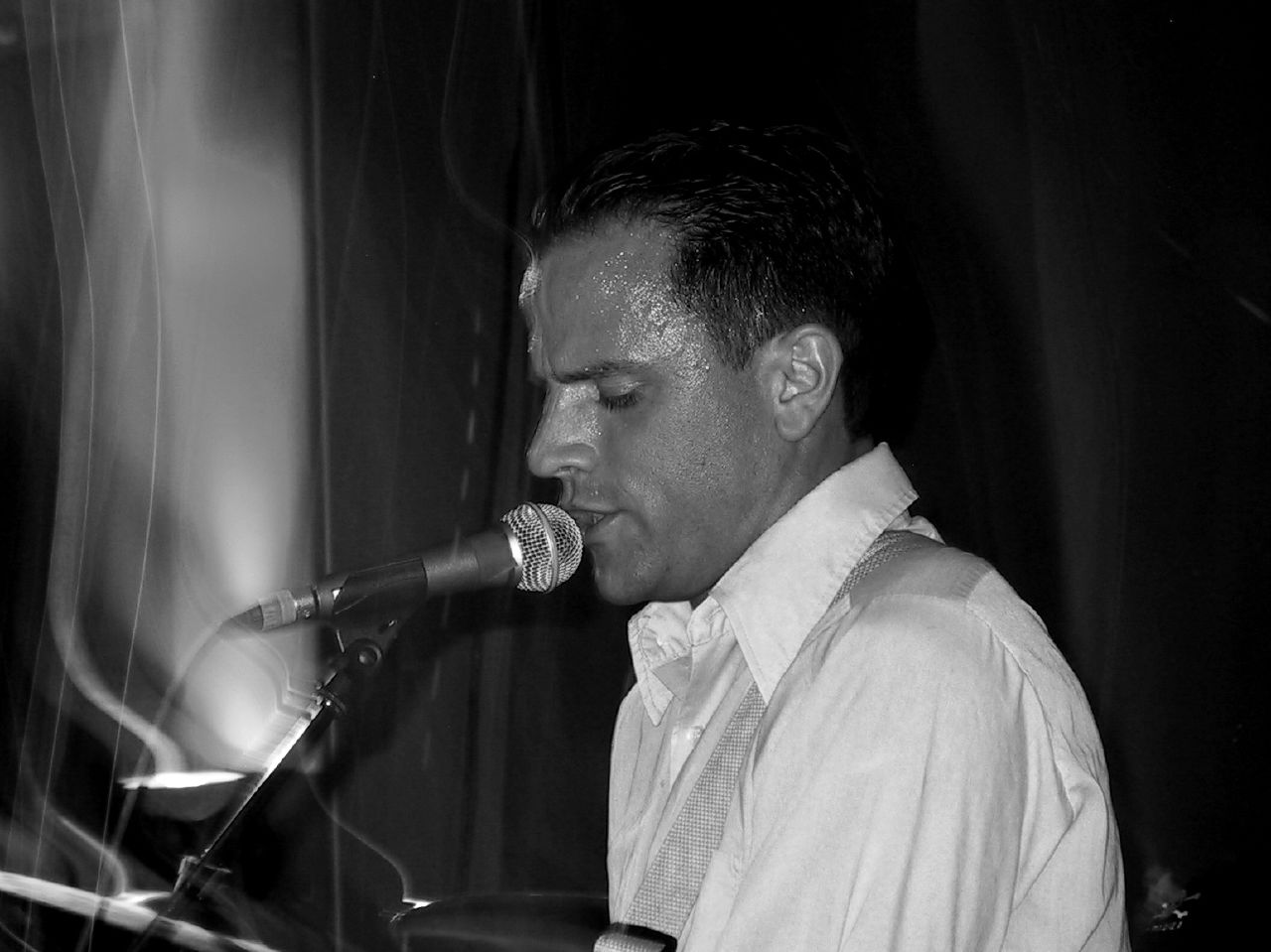
- MacPherson in 2006

Background information
- Born: Greg MacPherson; 1973 (age 52–53); Sydney, Nova Scotia, Canada
- Genres: Indie rock; indie pop
- Occupation: Singer-songwriter
- Instruments: Vocals; guitar; piano; drums; bass
- Labels: Smallman Records; G7 Welcoming Committee Records; Disintegration Records
- Website: gregmacpherson.com

Greg MacPherson (born 1973) is a Canadian singer-songwriter based in Winnipeg, Manitoba. MacPherson performs both solo and with a backing band.

MacPherson's sixth album, Mr. Invitation, was released on March 30, 2010, and was longlisted for the 2010 Polaris Music Prize.

MacPherson co-owns Canadian indie label Disintegration Records. He has previously released albums on G7 Welcoming Committee Records, and more recently Smallman Records. The independent record label play/rec, based in Copenhagen, has released a compilation LP in Europe. His two most recent albums, Disintegration Blues in 2011 and Fireball in 2013, were released on his own Disintegration Records following the demise of both G7 Welcoming Committee Records and Smallman Records.

Fireball was a longlisted nominee for the 2014 Polaris Music Prize.

In 2017 MacPherson collaborated with Rob Gardiner in the project Figure Walking, whose debut album The Big Other was a longlisted nominee for the 2017 Polaris Music Prize.

== Discography ==
- The Year of The Record Break (1997)
- Balanced on a Pin (1999)
- Good Times Coming Back Again (2002)
- Maintenance (2004)
- Night Flares (2005)
- The Sun Beats Down (2006)
- Mr. Invitation (2010)
- Disintegration Blues (2011)
- Fireball (2013)
