= Supporting Caste =

Studio album by Propagandhi
- Released: March 10, 2009
- Recorded: October–November 2008
- Studio: The Blasting Room, Fort Collins, Colorado
- Genre: Melodic hardcore
- Label: G7 Welcoming Committee, Smallman, Hassle
- Producer: Bill Stevenson

Propagandhi chronology
Potemkin City Limits (2005)	Supporting Caste (2009)	Failed States (2012)

Professional ratings
Review scores
Source	Rating
Absolute Punk	(8.9/10)
AllMusic	3.5/5 stars
Punknews	4.5/5 stars
Sputnikmusic	4.5/5 stars

Supporting Caste is the fifth studio album by the Canadian punk rock band Propagandhi. It was released on March 10, 2009, by G7 Welcoming Committee Records and Smallman Records in North America, Hassle Records in the UK and Europe, and Grand Hotel van Cleef in Germany.

== Recording ==
Supporting Caste is the first Propagandhi release with second guitarist David "The Beaver" Guillas and the first not released on the band's former longtime label Fat Wreck Chords. It is also the third Propagandhi release on their own label and the first on Smallman Records. The album was recorded at The Blasting Room in Fort Collins, Colorado.

== Release ==
On January 13, 2009, Supporting Caste was announced for release in two months' time; alongside this, the album's artwork and track listing were posted online. In February 2009, the band embarked on a tour of Australia and New Zealand. "Dear Coach's Corner" premiered on BBC Radio 1 on February 2, 2009. The following week, listeners could receive "Supporting Caste" and "Human(e) Meat" if they donated to one of three charities that the band chose. In March 2009, they embarked on a series of East Coast shows, which included a performance at the Harvest of Hope Fest. They were mainly supported by Paint It Black, with additional local acts on most shows. In part to stop or impede the leaking of the album, the band set up a page with an option to receive two high-quality songs from the album before release by donating as little as $1 to one of three activist organizations supported by the band. This page also linked to various pre-orders of the album. The artwork is by the Canadian artist Kent Monkman, entitled "The Triumph of Mischief". Supporting Caste was posted on the band's Myspace on March 3, 2009, and was released on March 10, 2009. The album was critically acclaimed and was voted by Punknews users as the best album of 2009. In April 2009, they went on a short tour of the United Kingdom. In May and June 2009, they toured the West Coast and Midwest with Bridge and Tunnel and Strike Anywhere. In October 2009, they played a handful of Canadian shows with support from the Rebel Spell. They closed out the year touring the UK alongside Strike Anywhere and Protest the Hero.

== Track listing ==
All music is composed by Propagandhi.

No.	Title	Length
1.	"Night Letters"	3:53
2.	"Supporting Caste"	4:58
3.	"Tertium Non Datur"	3:17
4.	"Dear Coach's Corner"	4:52
5.	"This Is Your Life"	1:04
6.	"Human(e) Meat (The Flensing of Sandor Katz)"	2:48
7.	"Potemkin City Limits"	3:49
8.	"The Funeral Procession"	4:15
9.	"Without Love"	3:50
10.	"Incalculable Effects"	2:09
11.	"The Banger's Embrace"	2:13
12.	"Last Will & Testament"	15:16
Total length:		52:20

- The song title "Tertium Non Datur" is in Latin, meaning, "There is no third [possibility]", i.e. the Law of excluded middle, though Fallacy of the excluded middle better reflects the lyrics.
- On the CD, the final song ("Last Will & Testament") is followed by several minutes of silence, an excerpt from Black House (at 11:06) and a cover version of Black Widow's "Come to the Sabbat" (at 11:22). On the double LP, the two songs are separate tracks, sequenced normally.

== Personnel ==
Propagandhi

- Chris Hannah – guitar, vocals
- Jord Samolesky – drums
- Todd Kowalski – bass guitar, vocals
- David Guillas – guitar

Artwork

- From Kent Monkman's painting "The Triumph of Mischief"

Production

- Bill Stevenson – producer
- Andrew Berlin – mixing, engineering
- Jason Livermore – mixing, engineering, mastering
- Emma Goldman – author
- H.L. Mencken – author
- Felipe Patino – editing

== Charts ==
Chart performance for Supporting Caste
Chart (2009)	Peak position
Australian Albums (ARIA)	86
Canadian Albums (Nielsen SoundScan)	28
UK Independent Albums (OCC)	41
US Billboard 200	162
US Heatseekers Albums (Billboard)	7
US Independent Albums (Billboard)	24
