= Less Talk, More Rock =

Studio album by Propagandhi
- Released: April 23, 1996
- Recorded: January 1996
- Genre: Punk rock
- Length: 25:49
- Label: Fat Wreck Chords
- Producer: Ryan Greene

Propagandhi chronology
Propagandhi/F.Y.P. (1995)	Less Talk, More Rock (1996)	Where Quantity Is Job #1 (1998)

Professional ratings
Review scores
Source	Rating
AllMusic	4/5 stars

Less Talk, More Rock is the second studio album by the Canadian punk rock band Propagandhi, and the last album to feature bassist John K. Samson. It was released in 1996.

Chris Hannah described the album as a conscious decision to be more confrontational, noting the presence of the term "gay-positive" on the album cover. The album was expressly political to weed out the "jocks" and "bros" in the audience.

"When How to Clean came out, we had no idea anyone would like it, then we went and played some shows and all of a sudden, oh, who are all these fucking jocks and skaters and surfers here? Fuck them," says Hannah. "Let's draw a line in the sand, let's make sure we're not misunderstood. We have these values, let's make sure nobody misunderstands them, even if it separates the wheat from the chaff and we're the chaff and it's just us. Let's lay it out on the table."

The album was ranked sixth on Phoenix New Times's "10 Best Political Punk Rock Albums of All Time" list.

== Track listing ==
No.	Title	Length
1.	"Apparently, I'm a 'P.C. Fascist' (Because I Care About Both Human and Non-Human Animals)"	1:47
2.	"Nailing Descartes to the Wall/(Liquid) Meat Is Still Murder"	1:04
3.	"Less Talk, More Rock"	1:37
4.	"Anchorless"	1:39
5.	"Rio De San Atlanta, Manitoba"	0:39
6.	"A Public Dis-Service Announcement from Shell"	1:25
7.	"...And We Thought That Nation-States Were a Bad Idea"	2:24
8.	"I Was a Pre-Teen McCarthyist"	2:32
9.	"Resisting Tyrannical Government"	2:15
10.	"Gifts"	2:03
11.	"The Only Good Fascist Is a Very Dead Fascist"	1:10
12.	"A People's History of the World"	2:21
13.	"The State-Lottery"	2:13
14.	"Refusing to Be a Man"	2:40

== Personnel ==
- Chris Hannah – guitar, vocals
- Jord Samolesky – drums, background vocals
- John K. Samson – bass, vocals

== Cover art ==
The album cover is the promotional poster of the 1984 Calgary Stampede.
