= F.Y.P =

American punk band

- Also known as: Five Year Plan
- Origin: San Pedro, Los Angeles, California, United States
- Genre: Punk rock
- Years active: 1989-1999
- Label: Recess
- Past members: Todd Congelliere; Sean Cole

F.Y.P, the Five Year Plan, was a punk rock band founded in 1989 by Todd Congelliere, a predecessor to his more recent bands Toys That Kill and Underground Railroad to Candyland. During its history (from 1989 to 1999), it had a total of 20 different members.

== History ==
F.Y.P, or the Five Year Plan,, began as a one-man band with a Fisher-Price drum machine providing the beat.

In 2012, original members Congelliere and Sean Cole with two other members of Toys That Kill, bassist Casey (Chachi) Ferrara and drummer Mike "Jimmy Jackets" Felix, reunited as F.Y.P. for a handful of shows. By 2015 Congelliere had again stopped performing as F.Y.P.

== Discography ==
=== Albums ===
- Finish Your Popcorn (1992)
- Dance My Dunce (1993)
- Toilet Kids Bread (1996), produced by Blag Dahlia (of The Dwarves)
- My Man Grumpy (1997), also produced by Blag Dahlia
- Toys That Kill (2000)
- Five Year Plan (Collection of Previously Recorded Demos) (2006)

=== Singles and EPs ===
- Extra Credit (1990)
- Made In USA (1991)
- Cooties (1993)
- My Neighbores Is Stoopid (1993)
- Guido, Where Are You? (1993)
- Incomplete Crap (1994)
- Idiocy 101 (1994)
- Incomplete Crap Vol. 2 (1999)
- Come Home Smelly (2000)

=== Split EPs ===
- Propagandhi/F.Y.P. (1996)
- Chaniwa/F.Y.P (1999)

== See also ==
- Recess Records
- Toys That Kill
