= How to Clean Everything =

Studio album by Propagandhi
- Released: 1993
- Recorded: February 1993
- Studio: Westbeach
- Genre: Skate punk
- Length: 33:33
- Label: Fat Wreck Chords

Propagandhi chronology
How to Clean Everything (1993)	How to Clean a Couple o' Things (1993)

How to Clean Everything is the debut studio album by the Canadian punk rock band Propagandhi. It was released in 1993 on Fat Wreck Chords.

== Releases ==
On August 20, 2013, the album was re-released via Fat Wreck, on CD, green vinyl, and light blue/white vinyl with the songs "Pigs Will Pay", "Homophobes Are Just Mad Cause They Can't Get Laid" and "Leg-Hold Trap", plus four original demos. This version could also be purchased digitally.

== Reception ==
Professional ratings
Review scores
Source	Rating
AllMusic	4/5 stars

In 1995, The Fresno Bee deemed How to Clean Everything the best album released by Fat Wreck Chords. Writing for AllMusic, Mike Daronco, said the album represented an 'Anarchy 101 to a mass audience' and was fun at the same time. In 2016, Ron Knox for Vice Media said the album was designed to challenge listeners.

== Legacy ==
Vocalist Chris Hannah said about the album:

I dig it. We still play songs from that record. When I hear them and I play them, the message still resonates with me and I can see the 20 year old Chris writing those songs. It's still fun, I still get a kick out of it. When we play them these days, they seem seamless in the set, with the new songs. There's a bit of a difference in terms of the depth and dimension, but they're still fun to play. I just don't like when I hear that record, like when I hear that actual record, that recording. That moment in time. I'm just like, "Jesus Christ, turn that fucking thing off". But I don't regret it. I'm not trying to hide that record from people. I just can't lie to people and tell them we're going to make another How to Clean Everything.

== Track listing ==
All songs written by Propagandhi, except where noted

No.	Title	Length
1.	"Anti-Manifesto"	3:36
2.	"Head? Chest? Or Foot?"	2:04
3.	"Hate, Myth, Muscle, Etiquette"	2:43
4.	"Showdown (G.E./P.)"	3:47
5.	"Ska Sucks"	1:50
6.	"Middle Finger Response"	2:23
7.	"Stick the Fucking Flag Up Your Goddam Ass, You Sonofabitch"	2:51
8.	"Haillie Sellasse, Up Your Ass"	4:11
9.	"Fuck Machine"	3:06
10.	"This Might Be Satire"	1:34
11.	"Who Will Help Me Bake This Bread?"	2:41
12.	"I Want U 2 Vant Me" (Cheap Trick cover)	2:47

== Personnel ==
- Chris Hannah – guitar, vocals
- Jord Samolesky – drums, background vocals
- John K. Samson – bass, vocals
