= Recess Records =

US independent record label

Recess Records logo

Recess Records is an independent record label founded in 1988. Label founder Todd Congelliere (frontman for F.Y.P and Toys That Kill) initially made 100 cassettes of F.Y.P's songs and sold them at skateboard contests. Two years later, Congelliere released a vinyl record, F.Y.P's Extra Credit, an 11-song 7-inch record, and the label took off from there.

In between touring the U.S., Europe, and Japan, Congelliere began releasing records for fellow punk rock and DIY bands, eventually having a roster of close to 20 artists on his label. Pinhead Gunpowder, fronted by Green Day frontman Billie Joe Armstrong, announced in April 2008 that a new 7" single from the band would be released on Recess Records in late May 2008.

== History ==
- Recess started in a bedroom in Torrance, California in 1988.
- In 1995 Recess was moved out of the apartment into a warehouse.
- In 1997 Recess relocated to San Pedro, California (15 minutes away) and has been there ever since.
- In 2008, Recess launched the Recess Japan branch of the label

== Artists ==
=== Recess Records ===
- The Arrivals
- Audacity
- The Bananas
- Beatnik Termites
- Ben Weasel
- Bent Outta Shape
- Berzerk
- Civic Minded Five
- The Criminals
- The Crumbs
- The Dwarves
- F.Y.P
- Fleshies
- Four Deadly Questions
- Four Letter Words
- Furious George
- The Grumpies
- I Spy
- Jag Offs
- Japanther
- Jon Cougar Concentration Camp
- Jumpstarted Plowhards
- The Modern Machines
- Off With Their Heads
- Propagandhi
- Pinhead Gunpowder
- Quincy Punx
- The Riverdales
- Screeching Weasel
- Sharkpants
- Summer Vacation
- Screaming Females
- Swing Ding Amigos
- Toys That Kill
- Treasure Fleet
- Tenement
- The Underground Railroad to Candyland

=== Recess Japan ===
- Audacity
- Belly Button
- Brazil UFO
- Bust!
- The Cistems
- The Doodles
- Ffeeco Woman
- Fleshies
- Heart Shaped Hate
- The Mapes
- Nope Ople
- No People
- The Nowheres
- Peach Kelli Pop
- San Jose
- Seventeen Again
- Sharkpants
- The Sleeping Aides and Razorblades
- The Steadys
- Teenage Slang Session
- What The Kids Want
- The Underground Railroad to Candyland

== See also ==
- List of record labels
