= G7 Welcoming Committee Records =

Canadian independent record label

G7 Welcoming Committee
- Founded: 1997
- Founder: Chris Hannah; Jord Samolesky; Regal
- Defunct: 2010
- Genre: Punk rock Hardcore punk Rock; Spoken word
- Country of origin: Canada
- Location: Winnipeg, Manitoba
- Official website: g7welcomingcommittee.com

G7 Welcoming Committee Records was a Canadian independent record label based in Winnipeg, Manitoba. The label mostly released material by artists and speakers with a radical left-wing point of view.

== History ==
G7 Welcoming Committee Records was founded by Chris Hannah and Jord Samolesky of punk band, Propagandhi, and their friend, Regal, in 1997. The label operated out of Winnipeg's The Old Market Autonomous Zone. During its years of operation about 50 albums were released.

The label ceased operations in April 2008 although it did briefly come out of hibernation in 2010 to release a 3-track EP of Propagandhi songs from 1993 to 1996 as a benefit for Partners In Health.

In early 2015, it was announced on the G7 website that none of their previous releases were available for purchase as either physical copies or downloadable albums, but that most of their catalog was available on music streaming sites.

== Political aspect ==
According to the G7 website, when the label was established, the founders hoped "to create a label that politically radical bands and speakers could unflinchingly support and call home; where the driving force behind the label's output was social change and radical thought; and where the structure of the organization didn't contradict itself by mimicking the structures of unbalanced power and hierarchy in the profit-driven corporate world." To this end the label incorporates the economic structure Parecon proposed by Robin Hahnel and Michael Albert.

The name is a reference to the G7 which brings together the world's richest and most powerful countries in yearly summits to discuss the global political and economic society and to make collective decisions. The label's website explains, "The G7 Welcoming Committee is an idea of resistance [...] A 'Welcoming Committee' to tell them, with words and actions, what we think of their power and neo-colonialism, around the world and at home, and that people are willing to fight back ..."

== Associated bands ==
The following artists have released albums on G7:

- Bakunin's Bum
- ...But Alive
- Che: Chapter 127
- Clann Zú
- Consolidated
- GFK
- Giant Sons
- Head Hits Concrete
- Hiretsukan
- The (International) Noise Conspiracy
- I Spy
- Jamaica Plain
- Greg MacPherson
- Malefaction
- Mico
- Painted Thin
- Propagandhi
- Randy
- The Rebel Spell
- Red Fisher
- Rhythm Activism
- John K. Samson
- Subhumans
- Submission Hold
- Swallowing Shit
- warsawpack
- The Weakerthans

It also carries spoken word material by Noam Chomsky, Ward Churchill, Ann Hansen, and Howard Zinn.

== Compilation albums ==
- Return of the Read Menace (1999)
- Take Penacilin Now (2005)

== See also ==
- List of record labels
