= Martyrs of La Florida =

Roman Catholic Martyrs

Servants of God Martyrs of La Florida Antonio Inija and Companions
- Died: 1549–1715, Historic La Florida

The Martyrs of La Florida, also referred to as the Florida Martyrs or Antonio Inija and Companions, (d. 1549–1715) are 58 Spanish and Native American Catholic clergy and laity killed for their faith in Spanish Florida between 1549 and 1715, a time period that spans the historic La Florida Spanish missions era. The first of the martyrs was the Spanish Dominican Fr. Luis Cáncer and two of his companions, who were killed during the first purely evangelical expedition to Florida. Subsequent martyrdoms followed missionary encounters with French Huguenot-allied tribes, a Jesuit missionary expedition to modern Virginia, and Anglo-Creek raids into Spanish La Florida, most significantly at the 1704 Apalachee Massacre and other raids during Queen Anne's War. Many of the martyrs were tortured before being killed, including the Apalachee leader and lay catechist Antonio Inija who was burned at the stake for refusing to renounce his Catholicism.

== Petition for Canonization ==
The cause for canonization, titled "Servants of God Antonio Inija and 57 Companions," was opened On October 12, 2015 by Bishop Gregory Parkes of the Catholic Diocese of Pensacola–Tallahassee, united with the Florida Dioceses of St. Augustine, Saint Petersburg, Orlando, Venice, and Palm Beach, and the Dioceses of Savannah, Georgia and Richmond, Virginia, and the Archdiocese of Mobile, Alabama. The United States Conference of Catholic Bishops has also endorsed the cause. The lay Petitioner for the Beatification Cause chose the Native American, Antonio Inija, as the lead martyr of the group of 58 martyrs, which includes Fr. Luis de Cáncer and two other Dominicans, nine Jesuits, nine Franciscans, a priest from the Order of Saint John of God, and various lay people, including Native American women and children.

The Diocesan Phase of the Beatification Process was closed on October 12, 2023 by Bishop William Wack, CSC. The Dicastery for the Causes of Saints issued the Decree of Juridical Validity on January 8, 2025.

== Shrine ==
A shrine for the Martyrs of La Florida, named "Shrine of Mary, Queen of the Martyrs," is being prepared outside of Tallahassee, Florida close to El Camino Real, with the designs completed in 2022 by Cram and Ferguson Architects and work having commenced on the site in 2025 to restore the site's historic mansion as "a House of Mary, Mother of the Church." An outdoor Mass marking the opening of the sainthood cause was held at the location on 12 October 2015. The Shrine is envisioned to complete "what the Martyrs themselves might have built had they had the resources," using Churrigueresque style and Baroque inspirations from Spain and Latin America.

== List of the Martyrs de la Florida ==
Martyrs	Order, Vocation	Year	Mission or Location	Modern US State	Individuals
Fr. Cáncer and two companions	Dominican	1549	Present-day Tampa Bay	Florida	✝ Fr. Luis Cáncer de Barbastro, OP (Jun 26) ✝ Fr. Diego de Tolosa, OP (early Jun) ✝ Br. Fuentes, OP (early Jun)
Fr. Pedro Martínez	Jesuit	1566	Present-day Jacksonville, FL	Georgia	✝ Pedro Martínez, SJ (mid-Sep)
Fr. Juan Bautista Segura	Jesuit	1571	St. Mary's Mission at Ajacán, along the York River in present-day Virginia	Virginia	✝ Fr. Juan Bautista Segura, SJ (Feb 9 or 10) ✝ Fr. Luis Francisco de Quirós, SJ (Feb 4) ✝ Br. Gabriel de Solís, SJ (Feb 4) ✝ Br. Juan Bautista Méndez, SJ (Feb 4 or 5) ✝ Br. Pedro de Linares, SJ (Feb 9 or 10) ✝ Br. Sancho Cevallos, SJ (Feb 9 or 10) ✝ Br. Gabriel Gómez, SJ (Feb 9 or 10) ✝ Br. Cristóbal Redondo, SJ (Feb 9 or 10)
Antonia Florencia (teenage daughter) and eight companions	Franciscan, Laity	1647	San Antonio de Bacuqua in present-day Tallahassee	Florida	✝ Antonia Florencia (Feb 14) ✝ three Franciscan friars (Feb 14) ✝ Lt. Gov. Claudio Luis de Florencia (Feb 14) ✝ Juana de Leiva y Arteaga, the wife of the Lt. Gov. (Feb 14) ✝ Maria de Florencia, married daughter of Florencia (Feb 14) ✝ unborn child of Maria, cut from her womb (Feb 14) ✝ young son of Maria (Feb 14)
Fr. Sánchez and three companions	Franciscan, Sacristan, Laity	1696	Concepción de Atoyquime, Jororo Province (central Florida)	Florida	✝ Fr. Luis Sánchez, OFM (Oct 29) ✝ sacristan (Oct 29) ✝ young Indian cacique (Oct 29) ✝ two Guale missionaries, killed outside the mission (Nov–Dec)
Antonio Inija and three companions	Lay Catechists, Franciscan	1704, January 26	From San Luis de Talimali, martyred at La Concepcion de Ayubale, Apalachee Province, near present-day Tallahassee	Florida	✝ Antonio Inija (Jan 26) ✝ Fr. Juan de Parga Araujo, OFM (Jan 26) ✝ Apalachee man Cui Domingo (Jan 26) ✝ Apalachee leader Cuipa Feliciano (Jan 26)
Fr. Mendoza and three companions	Franciscan, Laity	1704	San Pedro y San Pablo de Patale, Apalachee Province, near present-day Tallahassee	Florida	✝ Fr. Mendoza (Jun 3) ✝ Apalachee Sacristan (Jun 3) ✝ two-year old Native American (Jun 3 or shortly thereafter) ✝ Native American woman of Patale (between Jun 3 and Jun 9)
Balthasar Francisco and sixteen companions	Laity	1704	San Pablo de Patale, Apalachee Province, near modern Tallahassee	Florida	✝ Balthasar Francisco (Jul 4, 1704) ✝ Don Pedro Marmolejo (Jul 4, 1704) ✝ 15 Apalachee Indians (Jul 4, 1704)
Timucuan Caciques	Laity (chiefs)	1704	Missions San Pedro de Potohiriba and San Mateo de Tolapatafi, in present-day Madison County, Florida	Florida	✝ names unknown (Aug)
Fr. Agustín Ponce de León, OFM	Franciscan	1705	Approx. 13 miles north of Castillo in St. Augustine	Florida	✝ Fr. Agustín Ponce de León, OFM (Sep 3)
Fr. Domingo Criado, OFM	Franciscan	1705	Likely in present-day Macon, Georgia while ministering to Apalachee Catholic refugees	Florida	✝ Fr. Domingo Criado, OFM
Don Patricio Hinachuba	Laity (chief)	1706	Led his villagers from Mission San Lorenzo de Ivitachuco (present-day Tallahassee) to Timucua Province, then near to outside St. Augustine where he was martyred.	Florida	✝ Don Patricio Hinachuba (springtime)
Fr. Phelipe Orbalaes, OH	Brothers Hospitallers of Saint John of God	1712	Priest and surgeon at Santa Maria de Galve hospital, Pensacola	Florida	✝ Fr. Phelipe Orbalaes, OH (Sep 1)
Fr. Tiburcio de Osorio, OFM	Franciscan	c. 1712–1715	Chaplain at Presidio Santa Maria de Galve, kidnapped in Pensacola, most likely martyred east of present-day Montgomery, Alabama	Florida	✝ Fr. Tiburcio de Osorio, OFM (date unknown)

== Historical background ==
=== Early Spanish expeditions ===
In 1513, the Spanish explorer Juan Ponce de León became the first modern European to land on what is now the continental United States along the Atlantic coast of northeastern Florida, theorized to be in the Melbourne, Florida region, though the precise location cannot be confirmed. Having arrived during the liturgical season of Easter, called in Spanish, Pascua Florida ("Easter of the Flowers"), Ponce de Leon named the verdant land La Florida, and proclaimed it for Spain under his governorship. From there the fleet sailed southward, rounding the Florida Keys and landing at southwestern Florida, where excursions were repelled by Calusa peoples. Ponce de León returned to Florida's west coast in 1521 to establish a colony, but was attacked again by the native peoples and died of an arrow wound. In 1526, Lucas Vázquez de Ayllón established a colony, the first by Europeans in the modern United States, somewhere in the mid-Georgia coast, southwest of Santa Elena in Beaufort Sound, named San Miguel de Guadalpe, with "Guadalpe" possibly in reference to the region's Guale Indians and the name "San Miguel" indicating the settlements' founding day on the feast of Saint Michael, September 27. However, after two difficult months, the colony was abandoned, with only 150 out of an original 600 colonists surviving. Two Dominican priests accompanied the mission, including Fr. Antonio de Montesinos, who had inspired the Laws of Burgos, the first Spanish laws to protect against Native American enslavement and to endorse their conversion to Catholicism.

In 1527, the Governorate of Cuba, Diego Velázquez de Cuéllar, sent Pánfilo de Narváez to seek riches and conquer empires like that of the Aztec thought to exist in La Florida. Having suffered a hurricane in the Caribbean, the reduced fleet made landfall near Tampa Bay. Eight priests were part of the expedition, including the Franciscan Fr. Juan Xuárez (or Suárez), who had been appointed the first bishop of La Florida. Not finding the expected populations or riches, Narváez split the expedition between his remaining ships and an inland force of 300 soldiers with the aim to meet to the north. Never encountering the land force, the ships returned to Cuba, along with five of the priests. The land party continued north into the Florida Panhandle lands of the Apalachee, whom later missionaries would have much success bringing to Christianity, but were repelled. Bearing sick and wounded, lacking supplies and food, the Spanish decided upon returning to Mexico by sea, building five vessels which carried off the remaining 242 men. A large storm off Galveston wrecked most of the boats, and only eighty survivors made it to shore, of whom all but four perished, including Fr. Xuárez. Those four made it back to Mexico after the arduous, eight-year cross-continental journey detailed in an account of the odyssey by Álvar Núñez Cabeza de Vaca.

While the Spanish Crown wearied of such failed expeditions, the riches of Mexico and Peru still sparked conquistador ambitions in La Florida. Hernando de Soto received an asiento, or royal contract, for a much larger excursion to in 1539, though he had to finance the expedition personally, using the fortune he made in Peru. Landing at or near modern-day Tampa Bay, perhaps at the mouth of the Manatee River with 620 men, 250 horses and many dogs, De Soto made his way north to the lands of the Apalachee, then north through the modern Deep South and across to the Mississippi River, where he died and was buried in 1542. De Soto's expedition had been accompanied by several priests, but it was not a formal missionary expedition, as would be conducted in 1549 by the Dominican Father Luis Cáncer, the first of the Martyrs of La Florida. Father Cáncer had successfully converted hostile tribes in Guatemala and proposed a similar approach for the tribes of La Florida. The Spanish King approved his request, but with the caution to avoid areas where prior Native encounters had turned hostile.

=== Spanish administrative and missionary capital at Saint Augustine ===
Among other sailings and expeditions to the Florida Gulf Coast, in 1559, Tristán de Luna y Arellano set up a colony, christened Santa María de Ochuse, in Pensacola Bay, that was intended to establish a trade route the east coast of La Florida, especially in order to head off a reported French presence at Santa Elena off the coast of modern South Carolina, and which was to be fortified and settled by a later Spanish expedition up the Florida east coast. Luna's mission lasted two years before a series of final abandonments. The Atlantic coast expedition sailed in 1565 under the Spanish Admiral Pedro Menéndez de Avilés whose considerable fleet established San Agustin, or Saint Augustine. His purpose was to protect Spanish interests and to convert and educate the indigenous peoples to Catholicism. Menéndez's settlement would become the permanent political and missionary capital of La Florida.

The French reached Florida in 1562, under the Huguenot naval officer, Jean Ribault who aimed to establish a Huguenot refuge in the New World. Landing in an area off the coast of South Carolina previously mapped in the 1520s by the Spanish, who called it Santa Elena, Ribault built a fort at modern Parris Island, naming it Charlesfort. The site was abandoned within a year. A second French expedition in 1564 led by René Goulaine de Laudonnière, landed inside the mouth of the St. John's River near modern Jacksonville, Florida, and built the short-lived Fort Caroline. While the Huguenots developed extensive political and economic interactions with the Natives, their focus was not on conversion of the tribes but in turning them against the Catholic Spanish. In September 1565, soon after establishing St. Augustine, Governor Menéndez quickly defeated the Huguenots and destroyed Fort Caroline, ending their presence in La Florida. In 1566 the Spanish constructed a fort at the location of the Charlesfort, calling it San Salvador and subsequently San Felipe. Governor Menéndez ordered settlement at the location, naming it Santa Elena.

The next year, a ship bearing three Jesuits was caught by a hurricane and made landfall north of its intended destination of St. Augustine. The head of these Jesuits, Father Pedro Martínez, volunteered to lead a small party to shore, where they were murdered by the Saturiwa, a Timicuan chiefdom that had been aligned with the Huguenots. Frs. Martínez and Luis Cáncer and his companions are considered the Proto-Martyrs, or first, of the Martyrs of La Florida.

During the 16th century, when terrestrial and maritime explorations were most expansive, Spanish Florida can be said to have extended from the Florida Keys northwest through Alabama and Mississippi and past the Mississippi River into Arkansas and then eastward through Tennessee and the Carolinas, including a brief missionary settlement on the York River in Virginia. After the 1587 abandonment of Santa Elena and the arrival of the first of many large groups of Franciscans, Spanish missionary efforts were more geographically limited, ultimately extending across the northern half of Florida and southeastern Georgia, with as many as 140 missions that converted many thousands of Indians to Catholicism.

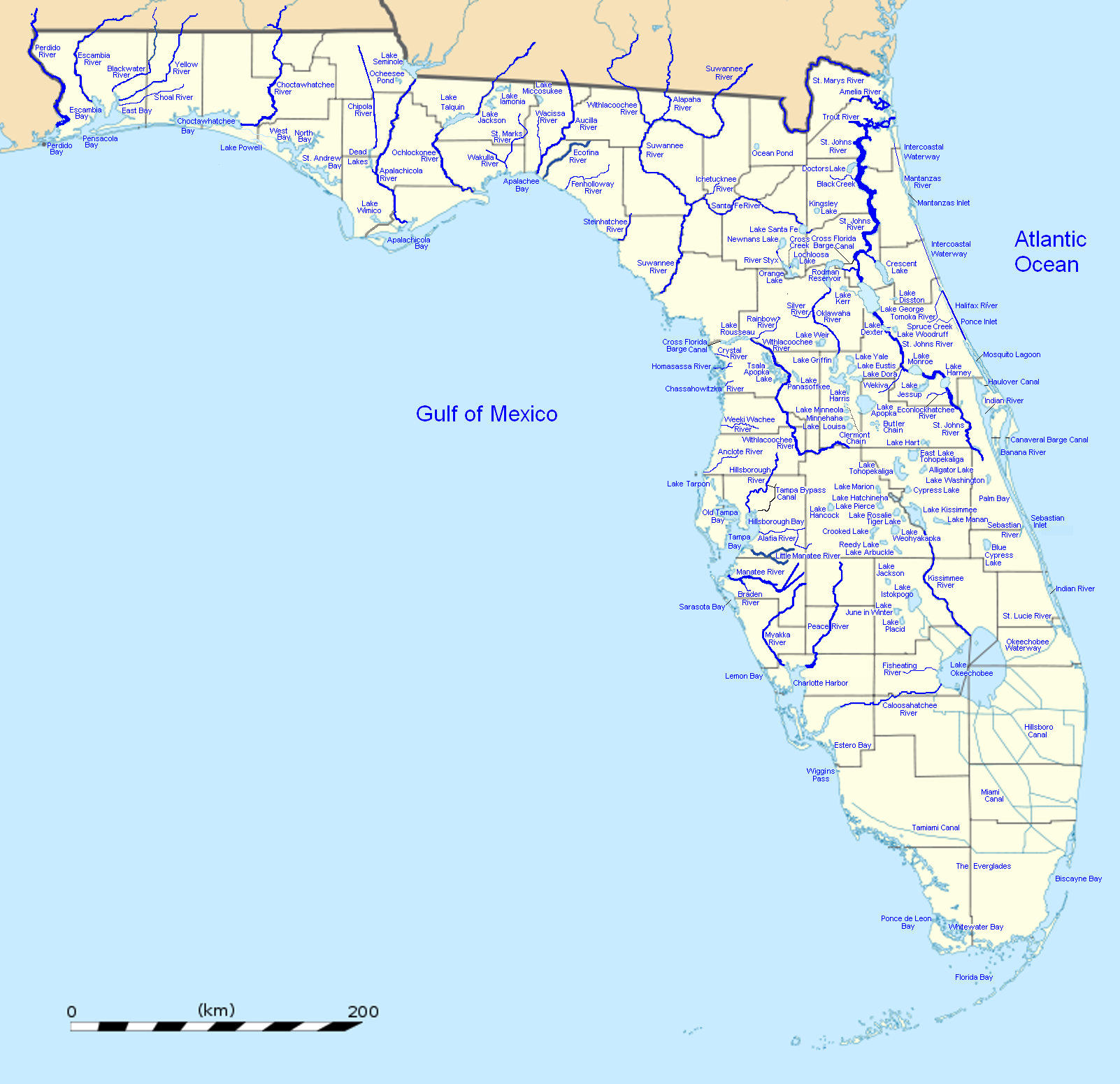
Modern map of Rivers of Florida

=== Spanish missionary provinces of La Florida ===
By 1700, Spanish Florida consisted of four major missionary and administrative provinces. These were the Apalachee Province at the eastern portion of the Florida panhandle around modern Tallahassee, the Guale Province, in Modern Georgia, north of the Altamaha River at the center of the Georgian coast, the Mocama Province, extending from coastal northern Florida to southern Georgia, and the Timucua Province, between the St. Johns River and Suwannee River rivers in north-central Florida. Many Spanish missions were built along the traditional Native trade routes connecting the Atlantic Coast to the Apalachee Province and along the Gulf Coast. Starting in the 1660s the English-backed Westo and Yamasee tribes attacked Spanish missions in the Guale and Mocama provinces, which were fully abandoned by 1684. Starting around 1702, English colonial and Creek, or Muskogee, groups living in central Georgia and Alabama, forces raided the Apalachee Province, culminating in the destruction of the Apalachee during the destruction of the Apalachee between January and July 1704, which produced many of the Martyrs of La Florida. Spanish and Catholic Indian refugees fled west to Spanish Pensacola or French Mobile, or east to the Timucua Province in central Florida or to St. Augustine, with other Apalachee siding with the Creek and English forces and relocating north into modern Georgia.

After the rest of the Apalachee and Timucua survivors were routed over the next two years, by 1706 the era of missions within Native homelands had ended, and Spanish governance of La Florida moved to a more purely presidio system of military garrisons with attached colonial communities, many with refugee missions huddled nearby. At the 1763 Treaty of Paris following the Seven Years' War, the British gained control of Florida, and the Spanish Catholic population largely fled with the Spanish to Cuba and Mexico. In 1763, a small group of eighty-nine Catholic Yamasee and five Apalachee Indians departed Florida, with 47 ending up near Veracruz, Mexico, where they founded the San Carlos de Chachalacas colony.

== Fr. Luis Cáncer (Florida, 1549) ==
The first purely missionary excursion to La Florida was led by the Dominican priest and proto-martyr,Luis Cáncer de Barbastro in 1549. A friend of his famed Dominican superior, Bartolomé de las Casas, the first Protector of the Indians, Fr. Cáncer was known to be a creative, caring, zealous and holy missionary. After time in Puerto Rico and Hispaniola, Fr. Cáncer peacefully converted a very hostile region of Guatemala, where he employed novel evangelical techniques such as teaching Indian converts to sing the Gospel message in their native language. The Spanish King Charles V was "astonished" by the friar's evangelical successes, and endorsed Fr. Cáncer's request to evangelize Spanish Florida. Fr. Cáncer's missionary approach was in accordance with the Spanish New Laws issued by Charles I in 1542 for "good treatment and conservation" of the Indian peoples. As such Fr. Cáncer's mission to La Florida included four priests, a lay brother, and a farmer contracted to help establish the mission for one year, but no soldiers other than his maritime escorts. Fr. Cáncer had originally planned to return Native peoples taken from La Florida by De Soto and relocated to Central America, especially Guatemala. The plan was never carried out, although he did bring as interpreter an Indian woman named Magdalena who had been brought to Cuba by the De Soto expedition.

Since the prior expeditions of Ponce de Léon, Narvaez and De Soto had fought with Native tribes, the expedition sought to land where there had been no prior Spanish encounters. However, the ship's captain sailed to present-day Clearwater Harbor on the west coast of Pinellas Peninsula, across from Tampa Bay, in the general region of where previous expeditions had landed. The ship moved northward to find a more suitable landing spot, but after Fr. Cáncer led a small party to navigate the shallow water in a shallop and on landing ashore was shot at with arrows from a group of six Indians, they returned to the carrack and sailed back south to the original location they had sighted at Clearwater Harbor. There, they were greeted by the members of the Tocogaba tribe in a friendly manner and exchanged gifts. Two Friars, Dominicans Father Diego de Tolosa and Brother Fuentes, a sailor, and the translator Magdalena, stayed ashore with the intention to travel by land to a port near modern-day Safety Harbor where they were to meet up with the carrack. Fr. Cáncer returned to the ship to retrieve food and more gifts, but on returning discovered the friars and translator were gone. A few Indians on the shore enticed a Spanish sailor to jump ashore to retrieve fish offered by the Indians, and was taken away. Fr. Cáncer returned to the carrack and decided to sail to the port in hopes of finding the land party. After over two weeks of sailing into the Tampa Bay, they finally encountered the same Indians they had met on the western shore of the peninsula, only the friars were not with them. During a tense exchange near the shoreline, Magdalena, now disrobed as the other Indians, told the Spanish that the friars were held at the chief's house. It was agreed that the Spanish would return the next day with metal axes that the Indians wanted.

Meanwhile, a Spanish captive of the tribe, a survivor of the De Soto expedition, Juan Munos, escaped by canoe and made his way to the carrack, where he told Fr. Cáncer that the friars had been murdered, the sailor enslaved, and Magdalena had rejoined the tribe. Fr. Cáncer, ever determined to evangelize, and desiring to avoid any future Spanish retaliation for the murders, decided to seek them again, anyway. On June 26, 1549, Fr. Cáncer made his way to shore in a dinghy with a small crew. Approaching a group of Indians, he admonished the Spanish not to provoke them, although the escaped Spanish, Munos, told the Indians the Spanish knew about the friars. Alone, Fr. Cáncer waded ashore to speak with them. He prayed, embraced one of the Indians, and was then clubbed him to death within sight of the dinghy.

Fathers Cáncer and Tolosa, and Brother Fuentes were the first of the Martyrs of La Florida and are recognized as among the Proto-Martyrs of Florida.

=== Veneration ===
In 1860, Bishop Augustín Verot decided that the first parish on Florida's west coast at Tampa should be named St. Louis Church in honor of Fr. Luis Cáncer. In 1918, Fr. Cáncer's likeness was installed as part of a large stained glass window at the Church of St. Vincent Ferrer in New York Espíritu Santo Catholic Church in Safety Harbor, Florida, near the location of his death, has a stained glass window that depicts Cáncer's evangelization efforts.

In 1998 the Diocese of St. Petersburg established the Fr. Luis de Cáncer Distinguished Priestly Service Award to be given annually to a priest of the Diocese of St. Petersburg who best exemplifies selfless and dedicated service to the people of God. In 2011, the diocese placed a Catholic Heritage Marker at the main entrance of that church, acknowledging both his and other early Catholic missionary efforts in the Tampa Bay area.

== St. Augustine, Florida ==
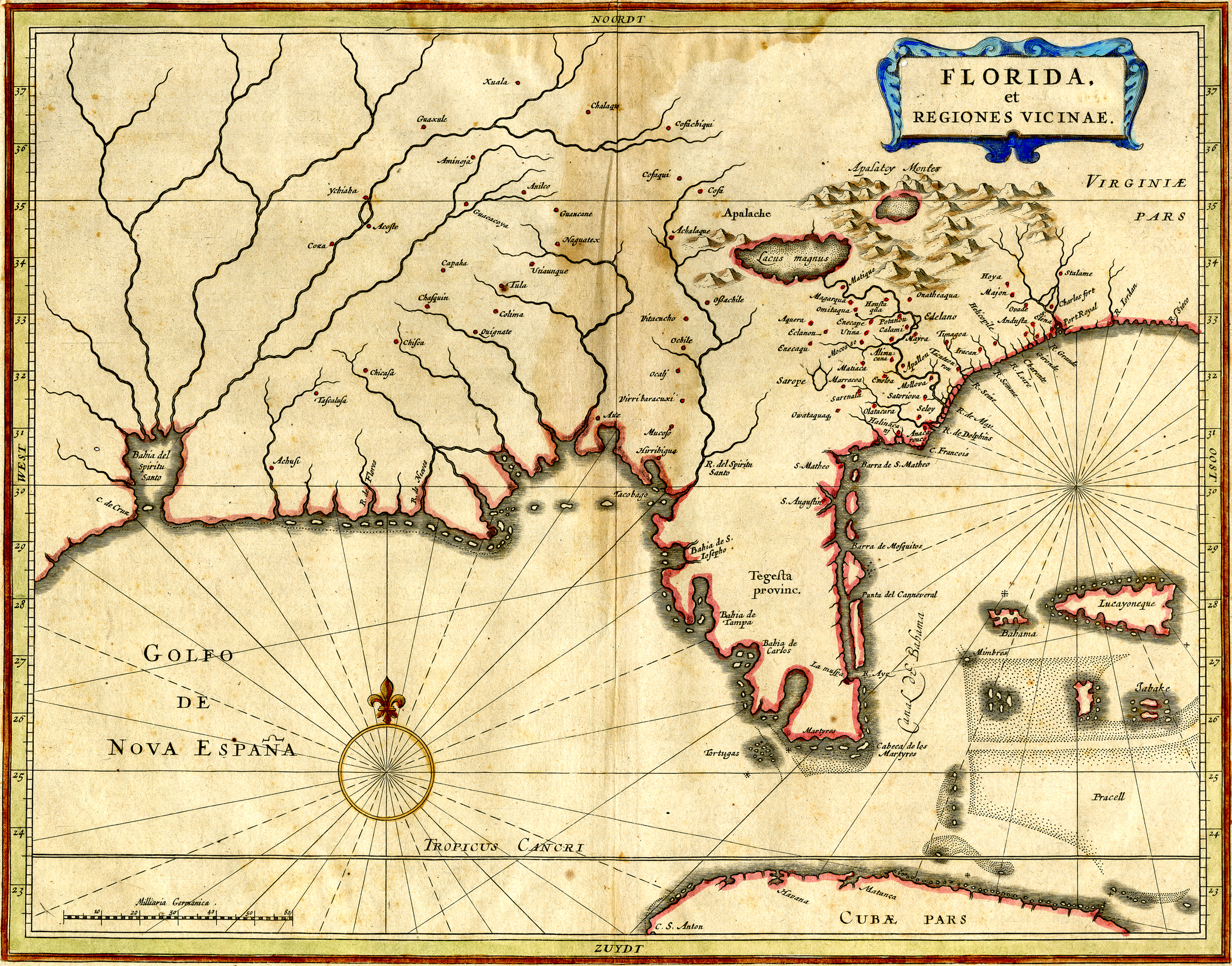
"Florida et Regiones Vicinae" ("Florida and Nearby Regions") (1640)

Granted the title, Adelantado de La Florida March 20, 1565 by King Philip II of Spain, Governor Menéndez set a fleet of 11 ships to sail for the North American Atlantic Coast in order to find suitable locations from which to support and protect his brainchild, the Spanish Treasure Fleet as it sailed up the coast of Florida in order to catch the Gulf Stream to return to Spain. His mandate to settle and govern La Florida included the duty to convert the local peoples to Christianity and Catholicism. Only five of the ships made it to Florida. On the Feast day of Saint Augustine of Hippo, August 28, 1565, the ships sighted the shores off the coast of the eventual landing site, which he would name for the Saint. The fleet continued north in search of the French Huguenot fleet, which he encountered at the mouth of St. John's River, at Fort Caroline, where Jean Ribault had returned on his second voyage with seven ships and about 800 soldiers and settlers.

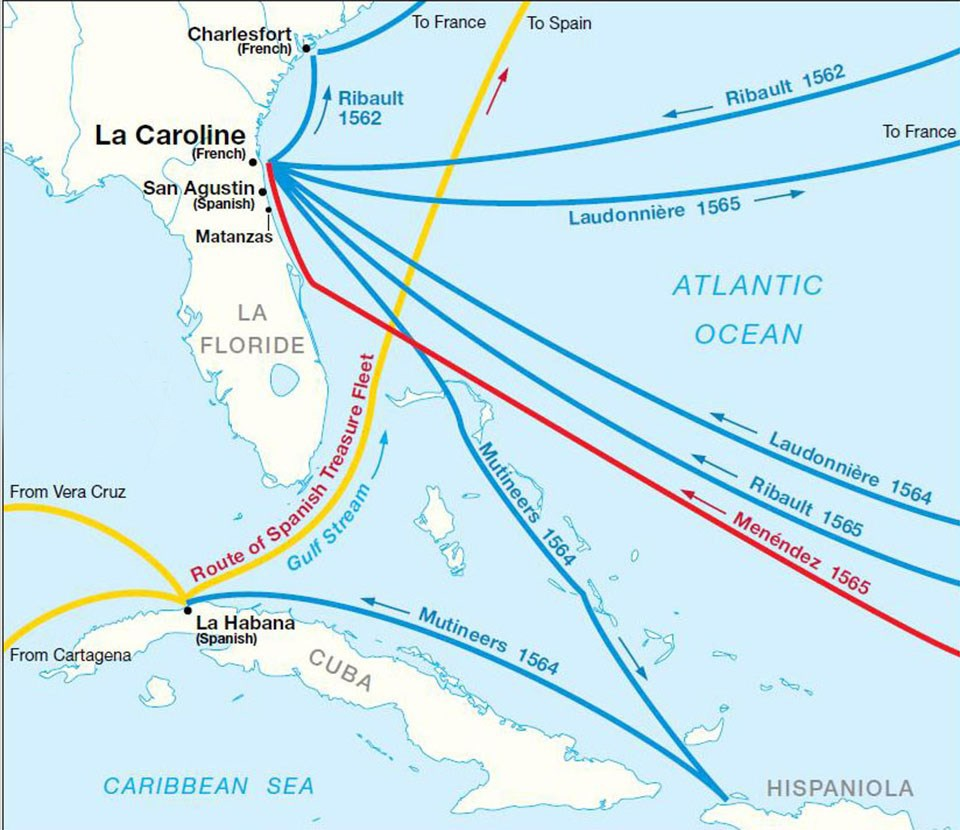
Map of French and Spanish expeditions to and near Fort Caroline, La Florida, 16th century

The French ships escaped the Spanish attack and fire, so Menéndez withdrew southward and landed at a small peninsula at the heart of Matanzas Bay, now downtown St. Augustine, Florida. Menéndez negotiated with the local Timucua tribe for permission to establish his site, which was quickly built and fortified, as he knew Ribault would move upon him there. The French fleet did sail after the Spanish, but was scattered and largely destroyed in a hurricane off the inlet to Matanzas Bay, so named for the massacre of Huguenots in Menéndez' subsequent attacks in a march to Fort Caroline starting September 17. In that and another action of October 12, the remaining Huguenot men were killed or executed, including Ribault.

A celebration of the establishment of St. Augustine was held on September 8, the Feast of the Nativity of the Blessed Virgin Mary, the thanksgiving Mass for which was presided by the expedition chaplain, the Franciscan Francisco López de Mendoza Grajales. After the Mass, a feast was shared with a Timucua tribe at the village of Seloy, marking the first thanksgiving meal between Europeans and Native Americans. Fr. López recorded in his diary events upon the landing of the expedition to Florida by the first Governor, Pedro Menéndez de Aviles,

"On Saturday the 8th, the General landed with many banners spread, to the sounds of trumpets and the salutes of artillery. As I had gone ashore the evening before, I took a cross and went to meet him, singing the hymn Te Deum Laudamus. The General, followed by all who accompanied him, marched up to the cross, knelt and kissed it. A large number of Indians watched these proceedings and imitated all that they saw done.”

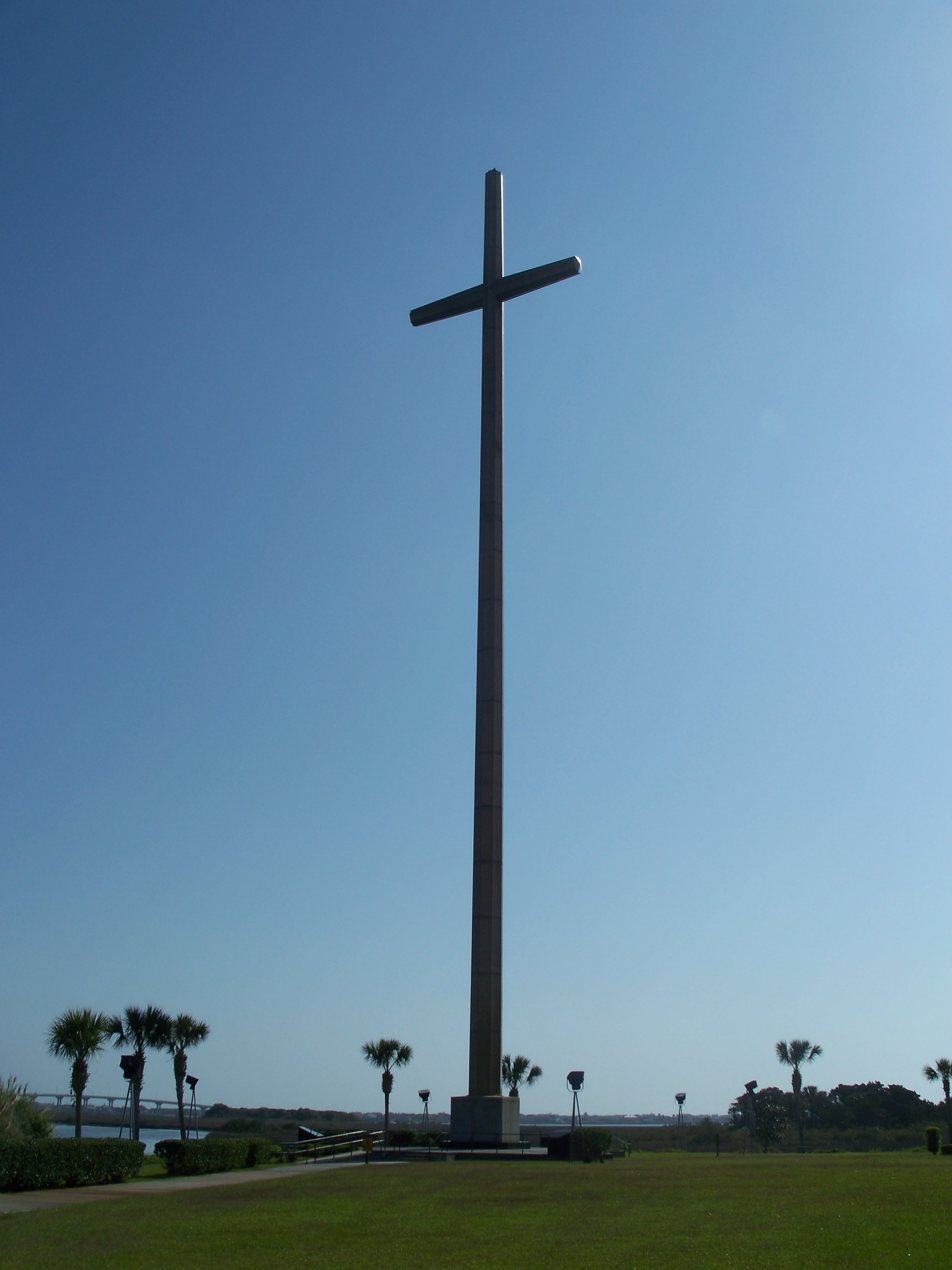
A 208-foot cross was erected upon the 400th anniversary of the founding of Saint Augustin in 1965. Placed at the approximate location of the 1565 landing at St. Augustine by Pedro Menéndez de Avilés.

For its continuity and formality, the Thanksgiving Mass is considered the first in North America, as well as the first Thanksgiving celebration with Native Americans. St. Augustine served as a base for Catholic missions, but it was not until 1587 that the Mission Nombre de Dios was formally installed by the Franciscans, becoming the most important Catholic mission in La Florida. In 1609 the mission built a shrine to Our Lady of La Leche, which remains, after several reconstructions, as the oldest shrine in the United States. See "Franciscan missions" below for more on the Nombre de Dios mission.

== Jesuit missions ==
The Jesuit Order, formally the Society of Jesus, was founded in 1540 by Ignatius of Loyola with an emphasis on evangelization and teaching. Newly recruited Jesuits were zealous to travel to Asia, and the New World, especially to areas that had never heard the Gospel, such as La Florida, where the first Jesuits arrived in 1566. Due to the number of priests killed, especially at Ajacán, the Order recalled them from La Florida. The Florida Governor Pedro Menéndez de Avilés requested Franciscan priests to replace them.

The first Jesuit mission in La Florida was established at the Spanish fort at San Antón de Carlos near Mound Key, in southwestern Florida, in an area ruled by the Calusa chief, Carlos, so named after the Spanish King, Charles I of Spain. In an attempt to pacify and unite Spanish control over rival Calusa and Tocobaga tribes, Governor Menéndez established forts at Tocobaga at Tampa Bay, San Antón de Carlos at Mound Key, and Tequesta near Biscayne Bay. Jesuit missionaries were stationed at Carlos and Tequesta, but their presence was sporadic and their impact limited due to continued tension and conflict with the tribes. The region was abandoned in 1569, leaving for forty-two years the lower Gulf coast of Florida isolated from the Spanish presence in La Florida. None of the Martyrs de la Florida were present at these forts or missions, although Jesuit Father Juan de Rogel, who later led the Mission at San Antón de Carlos in 1567 near Santa Elena, was a member of the first Jesuit excursion to La Florida with the Jesuit proto-martyr, Pedro Martínez.

=== Pedro Martínez (1566) ===
In response to a letter from Governor Menéndez to the Jesuit superior general, Saint Francis Borgia, in 1566 Jesuit priests Pedro Martínez and Juan de Rogel, and lay brother Francisco de Villareal, were sent to establish missions in and around St. Augustine. Eager to evangelize in the New World, the three Jesuits were the first sent to La Florida. They sailed directly from Spain in a Flemish merchant ship from the Spanish Netherlands in the company of a Spanish fleet. On the docks prior to sailing and during the voyage, Father Martínez enthusiastically catechized from ship to ship, including to the sailors in their native language. After departing from the fleet near Puerto Rico, the vessel carrying the Jesuits headed for Florida. However, a storm pushed it north towards the modern Florida-Georgia border at the mouth of the St. Marys River, possibly by Cumberland Island. While Fr. Martínez and several sailors went ashore for reconnaissance and supplies, another storm blew the ship out to sea.

After ten days awaiting return of the vessel or arrival of another, Fr. Martínez decided the party would make their way to St. Augustine along the coast. Encountering friendly tribes as they headed further south, just east of present-day Jacksonville, Florida by Mount Cornelia on Fort George Island, several of Flemish sailors went ashore to find fish. While in the skiff, Fr. Martínez and his remaining companions were surrounded and attacked by a group of hostile Timucua tribesmen, the Saturiwa that had allied with the Huguenots against Spanish Catholics. A Spanish soldier fought off the attackers and urged Fr. Martínez to escape. But refusing to leave the Flemish sailors behind, Fr. Martínez was seized and dragged ashore. The soldier later testified that Fr. Martínez fell to his knees and raised his hands as he was clubbed to death, making him the first Jesuit martyr in the Americas.

=== Santa Elena ===
In 1556 Governor Menéndez sought to move the Spanish capital from St. Augustine to Santa Elena, which the Spanish had recovered from the French attempt to settle it. Several forts and missions were built in the area, and 1569 there were 173 settlers who would soon build 40 houses. Although there was no native population in Santa Elena itself, following a scouting expedition by Father Juan Rogel in 1568, more Jesuits arrived to Santa Elena in June 1569, making it a Jesuit regional center. The Jesuit missions near Santa Elena included Escamau-Orista (1566–1570) and San Antonio de Carlos (1567–1597).

In 1556–1567 a sizeable expedition was sent to the interior, the Juan Pardo expedition, which installed small Spanish garrisons in the interior of modern South and North Carolina and Tennessee. Of the 120 soldiers manning those outposts, all but one was killed by Native tribes in an uprising in the spring of 1568. Santa Elena was burned in an Indian attack and abandoned in 1576, but was rebuilt and reoccupied in 1580. The outpost was permanently abandoned by the Spanish when the English privateer Francis Drake sacked St. Augustine in 1586, the year after which Governor Menéndez recalled the Santa Elena installation to St. Augustine in order to consolidate and strengthen St. Augustine. None of the Martyrs of La Florida came from this base, although the Ajacán Mission Martyrs stopped for supplies at Santa Elena on their way to evangelize in the Virginia Tidewater region.

=== Mound Key ===
The same year that Father Martínez tried to reach St. Augustine, Governor Menéndez led a group of 200 soldiers and three Jesuit priests to Mound Key in the Estero Bay estuary along the southwest coast of Florida, where he had previously sent a garrison of soldiers to construct a fort in the fall of 1566. The indigenous Calusa agreed for the Spanish to build a fort and mission, led by Fr. Juan Rogel who had accompanied Fr. Martínez, marking it as one of the first Jesuit missions in the Americas, and building there the next year one of the first Jesuit chapels in the Americas. However, tensions rose with the Calusa, and it was abandoned in 1569.

The final Jesuit missionary expedition came in 1570, known as the Ajacán Mission, per below.

== Ajacán Mission (Virginia, 1570–1572) ==
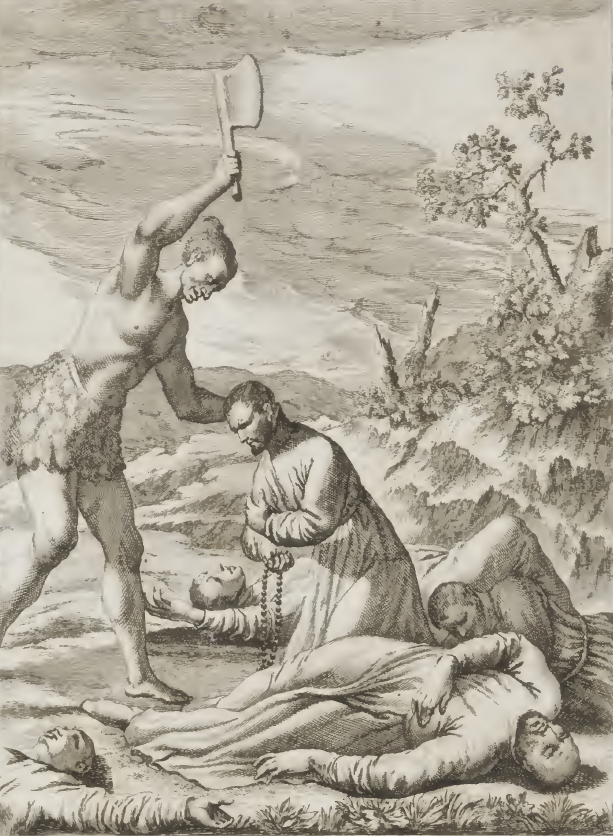
Martyrdom of Father Juan Baptista de Segura and Brothers Cristóbal Redondo, Pedro Mingot Linares, Gabriel Gómez, and Sancho de Zaballos, 1571

By the 1520s, Spanish maps identified Chesapeake Bay by the name Bahia de Madre de Dios, or Bay of the Mother of God. The bay held great importance to Spain who was engaged in a search for the rumored northwestern passage to Asia, as well as a possible site for garrisons to stop French intrusions into Spanish Florida and attacks on the Spanish treasure fleets that sailed the North American coastline. By 1570, Jesuit missionaries in Florida had become frustrated with only a few indigenous converts and what they saw as nearby military interference in the Native provinces they had been attempting to evangelize, and they believed the Chesapeake Bay would be a more fruitful mission field in part because of its remoteness. With permission of civil and ecclesiastical leaders, the Jesuits formulated a new mission in Virginia's Tidewater area, that was purely evangelical, without soldiers or weapons. It was named “St. Mary's Mission" in Ajacán the name the natives reportedly used for the region.

In September 1570, nine Spanish missionaries arrived in Virginia as part of this second Jesuit expedition to La Florida, having sailed from Seville on March 13, 1568. The party consisted of two Jesuit priests, Fr. Juan Bautista de Segura (the mission's superior) and Father Luis de Quirós; three Jesuit brothers, Pedro Mignot de Linares, Gabriel Gomez, and Sacho Zeballos; three lay catechists, Gabriel de Solis, Juan Baptista Mendez, and Cristobal Rendondo; and one young altar boy, Alonso de Olmos, who had come from the Spanish garrison at Santa Elena. The mission team also brought a Native American cacique, Don Louis, who was from the Tidewater region and had been captured by a Spanish expedition in 1561, and had had lived among the Spanish in both Spain and Mexico, becoming both a convert to Christianity and fluent in Spanish. He was to act as guide and translator for the Jesuits in their mission work among his people.

Finding the Tidewater region in a long period of drought and famine, with a greatly reduced indigenous population, Segura opted to remain and initiate missionary work. With the help of Don Luis, the Jesuits were warmly welcomed, the first baptism was performed, and a simple mission chapel and residence was constructed. A consensus of modern scholarship places the mission site along the York River. After only a few days, Don Luis completely abandoned the mission, returning to his people, and leaving the Jesuits unable to preach the gospel without a translator. The Jesuits’ situation quickly became desperate over the winter months with little food and illness. Segura made several overtures to reconcile Don Luis, but to no avail. During this time the Jesuits remained steadfast in prayer awaiting the return of a supply ship, and Segura is believed to have received the three lay catechists as novices of the Jesuit Order.

In early February 1571, Segura sent three Jesuits to speak with Don Luis. On February 4, as the delegation returned to the mission, Quiros, Solis, and Mendez, were killed by Don Luis and his warriors. On February 9, Don Luis led an attack on Segura and the remaining Jesuits at the mission site. All were killed, except for the altar boy, Alonso de Olmos, who was rescued by a Spanish relief expedition in 1572. The testimony of the boy served as the basis of the Church's recognition of the eight Jesuits as martyrs. The bodies of the Jesuits were never recovered.

== Franciscan missions (eastern & central Florida) ==
In 1586, after St. Augustine was attacked by the English explorer and privateer, Francis Drake, Governor Menéndez abandoned Santa Elena in order to reinforce his primary base at St. Augustine, which became the focus of coastal missionary activity. Also, with the recall of the Jesuits from La Florida after the failed Ajacán mission, Governor Menéndez requested Franciscan priests to replace them.

=== Mission Nombre de Dios (St. Augustine, Florida, 1587–1742) ===
Arriving in 1573, the Franciscan clerics employed a less directly evangelical approach to Native conversions, focusing on larger institutional incorporation of converts than had the Jesuits, which included integration of evangelical efforts with Spanish military and legal constructs, and successfully oversaw a period of evangelical expansion. In 1587 the Mission at Nombre de Dios near St. Augustine was formally established. The Mission would serve as the locus of the Spanish Catholic presence in La Florida and oversee not just regional evangelic missions but those across La Florida. Martyrs of La Florida associated with the Mission were killed during the events of the early 1700s, as reviewed below.

=== The Georgia Martyrs ===
By 1573, Franciscan priests had ventured into the lower Guale territories in modern Georgia. In 1595, the Franciscan Fr. Pedro Corpa established the Mission Nuestra Señora de Guadalupe de Tolomato. Along with four other missions between St. Catherines Island and the Altamaha River, a handful of Franciscans evangelized and converted several thousand Guale Indians. However, in a 1597 a rebellion called Juanillo's Revolt, or the "Guale Uprising," led by a young cacique convert, Juanillo, who resented the priests' enforcement of monogamy. Fr. Corpa was murdered amidst morning prayer, and in a subsequent attack at Mission Santa Clara de Tupiqui, Fr. Blas Rodriguez asked the attackers to allow him to celebrate Mass, which was granted. The next day at Santa Catalina de Guale on St. Catherines Island, Fr. Miguel de Añon and lay brother Antonio de Badajoz were killed. The last of the Georgia Martyrs, Fr. Francisco de Veráscola Sáez de Castañiza, who was stationed at Santo Domingo de Asao, had been at St. Augustine to retrieve sacramental supplies, was murdered as he disembarked from his return voyage. A sixth Franciscan survived an attack at Talapo, but was tortured and enslaved for ten months. A large force of Guale warriors then targeted Mission San Pedro de Mocama on Cumberland Island in lower Georgia, but a Spanish brigantine was anchored by the shore, and when a small part of the Guale force attacked the Mission, anyway, the Catholic Mocama cacique, Don Juan, fought them back. Governor Gonzalo Méndez de Canço led an expedition to retaliate and recover the bodies of four of the Georgia Martyrs. Into the 17th century, the Mission Santa Catalina de Guale, reestablished in 1602, would continue as the Guale province's missionary center before French and English raids forced relocation to Amelia Island in present-day Florida in 1784.

A separate petition for canonization from that of the Martyrs of la Florida has been submitted for the four Franciscan priests and one lay brother under the title, "Pedro de Corpa and Four Companions, OFM," more commonly known as the Georgia Martyrs.

=== Mocama missions (1580–1684) ===
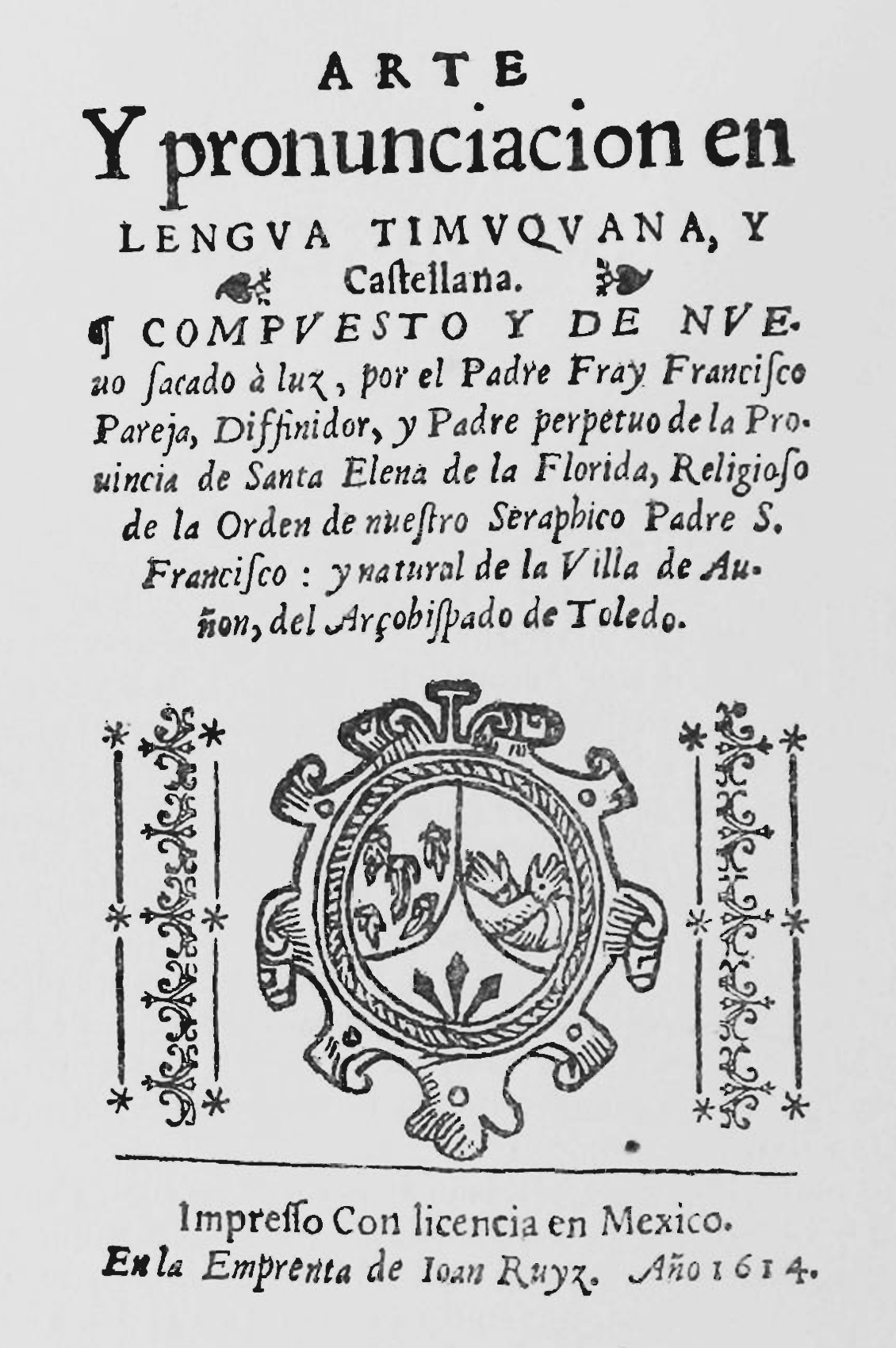
"Arte de la lengua timuquana" by Fr. Francisco Pareja (1614)

Following the Guale Uprising, as Franciscan and Native American Catholics restored the missions in Guale, peaceful conditions continued in the Mocama region, including at the Mission San Pedro de Mocama , which had been attacked in the 1597 Guale raid. The Mission successfully catechized Mocama Indians and taught some to speak and read Spanish and Latin, as well as to read and write in a Timucua script devised by the Franciscan Francisco Pareja who worked at the San Juan del Puerto mission on Fort George Island at the mouth of the St. Johns River. Fr. Pareja's 1612 Catechism, written in Spanish and Timucua, was the first published work in an indigenous language in what is now the United States. The cacique at San Pedro, Don Juan, who had fended off the Guale invasion, was so well-respected by the Spanish that he was awarded an annual salary equivalent to that of a soldier.

The Mission San Buenaventura de Guadalquini was established in 1605 on St. Simons Island, Georgia. The mission succeeded to the extent that in 1618 it served as the site of a Franciscan provincial chapter meeting. The northeastern missions carried on through the first part of the 17th century. However, by the 1670s, the growing English Protestant colony of Carolina pressured the northern and western Spanish missions, especially through alliances with Native tribes hostile to those aligned with the Spanish. The Georgia and northern Florida coastal missions were attacked by French and English privateers and pirates, including raids on St. Augustine in 1668 and 1683. In 1684, just after the Governor ordered the mission San Buenaventura to move further south, it was attacked and burned by pirates, its residents having been evacuated just before the attack. The Mocama Mission Santa María de Guale was abandoned in 1665 and consolidated with Mission San Juan del Puerto (also Mocama). The original location of Mission Santa Maria was subsequently resettled by pagan Yamasee immigrants in 1673 with Spanish permission. By 1685 all of the Spanish Mocama missions north of St. Mary's River were abandoned. Mission Santa Catalina de Guale, which was resettled to Amelia Island was overrun and destroyed by the English Carolinian raid of 1702.

=== Fr. Luis Sánchez & Central Florida Martyrs (1696) ===
The Franciscan Fr. Luis Sánchez was born in the New World at Havana in 1661. Rejecting his privileged upbringing, and called to serve the La Florida missions, he first went to San Luis de Talimali in Apalachee, and was then sent to south-central Florida, where five small missions were run by the Order. Fr. Sánchez served a remote mission in the Jororo province southeast of modern Orlando called Mission Concepción de Atoyquime.

Fr. Sánchez managed the Mission successfully, employing a young cacique (chief) from the town of Aypaja as his altar server and a villager as sacristan. However, a nearby tribe became angered by the friar's teaching, and on October 29, 1696, the Mission was attacked as Fr. Sánchez prepared for a Mass. The cacique altar boy was ordered to renounce his faith and to kill Fr. Sánchez, but he refused, and he, Fr. Sánchez and the native sacristan were murdered. A few weeks later, two Guale natives serving as sacristans in a neighboring town were killed in a similar revolt. Martyred with Fr. Sánchez, these Catholics were the first Native Martyrs of la Florida.

== Franciscan Apalachee missions (1600–1704) ==
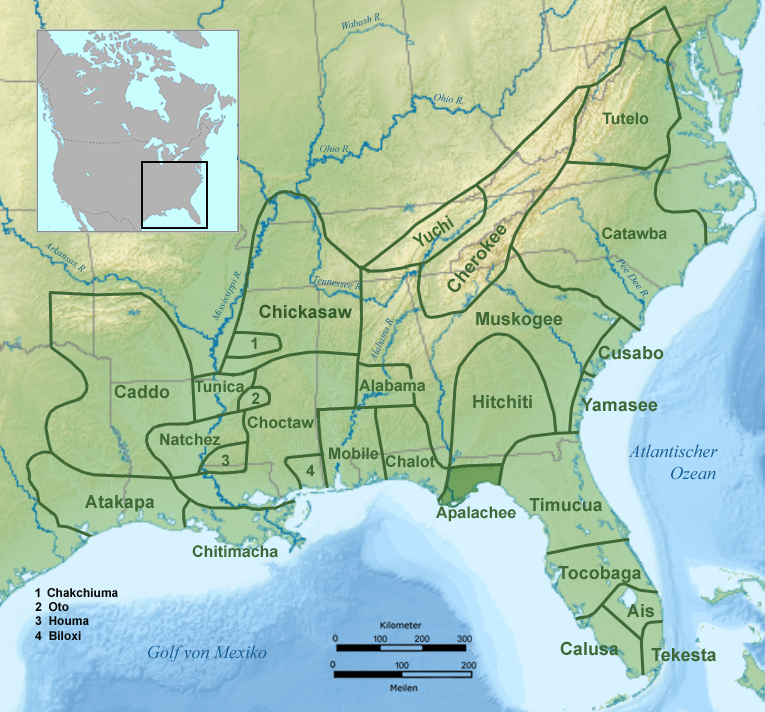
Apalachee Province highlighted

=== Background ===
Centered along the eastern portion of the Florida Panhandle, and part of the broader Mississippian cultures, the Apalachee chiefdoms were populous and administratively organized. Their land was fruitful, and the tribes engaged in extensive trade networks across the southeast to the Great Lakes regions, exchange that included copper, gemstones, maize, seafood, Cassina leaves (used as a tea), fresh and seawater shells and pearls, salt, and various artifacts, especially for elite display. Early sixteenth century Spanish explorers noted the extensive food stores in Apalachee villages.

While evangelizing in the Timucua region in the early 1600s, the Franciscan Fr. Martín Prieto realized that the enmity between the Timucua and Apalachee peoples hindered his mission. As a gesture of peace, in 1608 he sent two Timucua-held Apalachee captives ahead of him to the principle Apalachee chiefdom at Ivitachuco, on the western bank of the Aucilla River, the traditional border between the Timucua and Apalachee peoples. There, Fr. Prieto and another friar were greeted ceremoniously by thirty thousand Indians. Soon after, the Franciscan Alonso Serrano traveled through the region evangelizing, followed by other friars for several years. But it was not until 1633 that official mission named, San Lorenzo de Ivitachuco, was established. By 1647 eight out of about forty Apalachee chiefs had converted to Catholicism, along with thousands of baptisms and conversions.

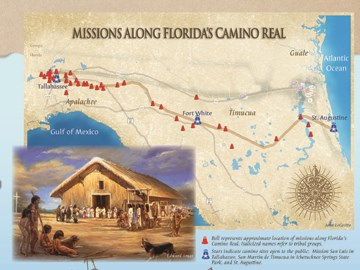
Modern map showing the approximate location of Spanish missions and the connecting Camino Real across northern Florida

For the Spanish colonial authorities, the Apalachee region presented an important transit and trade point that connected the west coast of La Florida by land to Saint Augustine and, with development of a port called San Marcos de Apalache, or St. Marks, at the confluence of the St. Marks and Wakulla rivers near the coastal center of Florida's Big Bend, thus providing water access to both St. Augustine and Cuba. The handful of Spanish soldiers who arrived in 1438 acted as purchasing agents for the Governor, and the first permanent garrison served fiscal duties regarding customs and trade. With introduction of Spanish farming technologies and animals, the region's importance grew, as did the presence on Spanish settlers who established ranches in the region. The more densely populated, agriculturally rich lands of the Apalachee Panhandle supported the Spanish eastern lands, especially at St. Augustine both for food production and labor. Traditional paths along rivers and overland trails were organized into a set path called El Camino Real, or the Royal Road, and series of Franciscan missions were set along these routes through the Timucuan province in order to serve as way stations and river crossings. By 1675, the San Lorenzo de Ivitachuco held 1,200 inhabitants.

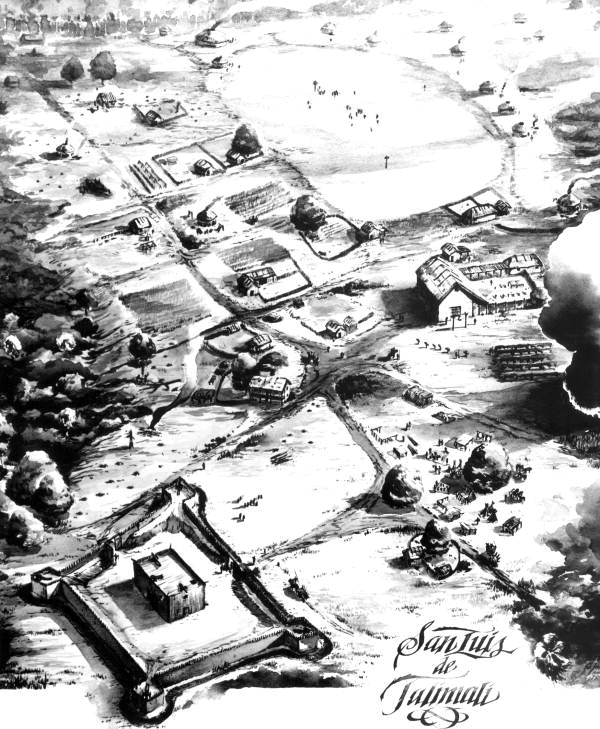
Mission San Luis

Among the first missions in the Apalachee region was San Antonio de Bacuqua, located at present-day Tallahassee, Florida and likely established in the late 1630s or early 1640s. The mission had a church and a permanent Franciscan presence. In 1656 the Spanish laid out the Franciscan missionary and colonial administrative center, also at Tallahassee, called Mission San Luis de Talimali (or San Luis de Apalachee). The Mission contained a large church and blockhouse, and its associated Apalachee village had its own plaza, as well as a large, traditional Council House that could hold up to 1,500 people, indicating the settlement's importance for both Spanish and Apalachee governance. As of 1675 the population at Mission San Luis stood at 1,400 out of a total 6,860 across all the Apalachee missions, making it the most populous in the Province.

Into the 1600s, European settlements to the north disrupted traditional Native tribal arrangements, resulting in changing alliances and migrations whose effects cascaded all the way to Spanish Florida, putting pressure upon the Spanish-aligned tribes. One group, the Chisca people, who were displaced from their homeland in southwest Virginia in during the Iroquois Wars, roamed across northern La Florida and in the early 1620s raided Spanish outposts and missionary villages. In the 1640s, Chisca warriors joined with mostly unconverted Apalachee and attacked several missions in what is known as the Apalachee Revolt of 1647, during which nine of the Martyrs de la Florida, three Franciscan friars and six Spanish men, women and children, were killed.

=== San Antonio de Bacuqua Mission and the Florencia Family martyrs (1647) ===
In 1645, the Spanish Governor Benito Ruíz de Salazar Vallecilla visited the Apalachee region, where recognizing its importance to the Spanish rule, he established a farm near the Franciscan mission San Miguel de Asile. Just before his visit, Governor Ruiz appointed as Deputy Governor of Apalachee, Claudio Luis de Florencia, who had been stationed at St. Mark's as a customs agent. Claudio Luis lived at a village named San Luis de Inihaica with his own and extended family.

In February 1647, Claudio Luis, his wife and children were invited to San Antonio de Bacuqua to celebrate the Feast of the Translation of the Relics of St. Anthony of Padua, the mission's Patron Saint. The night of the celebration, February 14, a group of Chisca and mostly non-Catholic Apalachee warriors, but also some recently converted Apalachee, fell upon the gathering in an organized and planned assault. Since the local cacique at the Florencia family's village of San Luis de Inihaica was not part of the plot, the Florencia family was lured to San Antonio de Bacuqua for the feast celebration, where they were targeted along with three Franciscan priests. The victims were tortured and murdered, including Claudio Louis de Florencia, his wife, Juana de Leiva y Arteaga, their two daughters, Antonia and Maria, and Maria's infant son (name unknown) and her unborn child, who was cut from her womb. During the attack, Antonia defiantly proclaimed "the Law of God," for which she was bound to the church and had her breasts and tongue cut off. All the bodies were thrown into a nearby lake.

The attackers burned another seven churches and sacked several other missions. Other friars escaped the attacks with the help of Catholic Apalachee, as well as six soldiers who were not at San Antonio mission as they were working on the Governor's farm at the time. Thirty-one Spanish soldiers raised a large Timucuan army and put down the rebellion, which had not included the major population center at Ivitachuco, the site of the first Franciscan mission in the region, Mission San Luis de Apalachee. Loyal Catholic Apalachee assisted the Spanish to identify the rebel leaders, and the missions were rebuilt, assisted, even, by some of the non-Catholic Apalachee who had participated in the attacks, and most of whom converted to Christianity over the subsequent decades.

== Siege of St. Augustine, 1702 ==
=== Historical background ===
Queen Annes War Before

The English American colonial population grew from the start of the 1607 Jamestown settlement to 250,588 by 1700 across the American colonies, which included the Province of Carolina created by charter in 1663. In 1670, 150 English settlers from Barbados and England established "Charles Town", now Charleston, about seventy miles north of the colonial town of Santa Elena, which the Spanish had abandoned in 1587. The charter for Carolina claimed for the colony all the land south of Virginia to 65 miles below St. Augustine, all of which had been claimed by Spain. However, the 1670 Treaty of Madrid that settled an Anglo-Spanish war in the Caribbean recognized certain English seizure of lands in the Americas, and by adverse possession set the Carolina border at the Savannah River, which marks the modern boundary between modern South Carolina and Georgia.

The Carolina colonists ignored the Treaty and sequentially forced out Spanish missions in modern Georgia by arming tribes hostile to the Spanish and organizing slaving raids upon Spanish missions, such as at the Timucua Province Santa Catalina de Ahoica (or Afuica), where, in 1685 eighteen converted Natives were killed and twenty-one taken as slaves. The church, convent, and most of the buildings were burned. The raid was by contract with Scottish colonists at Stuart's Town (located at modern Port Royal south of Charles Town), where they had been given land by the Carolina colony. Meanwhile, starting in 1783. English-backed pirate raids along the Spanish Florida coast forced Spanish abandonment of all missions north of the St. Mary's River. In response, in 1686 the Spanish Governor Márquez Cabrera dispatched three galliots that burned Stuart's Town and forced the Scottish. The raid also sacked the Carolina governor's plantation where the Spanish found items taken from the earlier pirate raids as well as a robe from Mission Santa Catalina de Ahoica.

To fend off English trade with the Lower Creeks, the Spanish had established a fort among the Apalachicola between 1689 and 1691, which prompted the Lower Creeks to evacuate their homeland on the Chattahoochee River and relocate to the Ocmulgee by present-day Macon Georgia, where in 1690 the English set a trading post. As of 1700, English traders had established strong relations with Creek and other Native tribes across the Carolinas and into Georgia, including as far as the head of the Apalachicola River at the present Georgia-Florida border. The trade consisted of English manufactures, such as firearms and rum, for deer pelts, and Indian slaves who were sold to Carolina plantations or shipped to New England and the Caribbean.

While Spanish La Florida presented obstacles of geography and religious animosity from the anti-Catholic English settlers, the expansion of French Louisiana added to the general colonial tensions. In 1699, the French explorer Pierre Le Moyne d'Iberville, who was born in French Canada, set a temporary colonial capital at Fort Maurepas along Biloxi Bay, Mississippi, thereby securing a port along the Gulf Coast and effectively connecting the Gulf region to French Canada via the Mississippi River. Recognizing the expansionist direction of the Carolina colony, in January 1702, d'Iberville encouraged the Spanish to expel the English from the lower Carolina. He would die in Havana while planning a joint French and Spanish invasion force to attack Charles Towne, a plan that was carried out unsuccessfully by the French captain Jean Lefebvre who in August 1706 launched an expedition from St. Augustine.

=== Queen Anne's War (1702–1713) ===
In November 1700, the Spanish Habsburg king, Charles II, died childless, leaving in dispute rule of the Spanish Empire. The following year, Louis XIV of France installed his Bourbon grandson, Philip of Anjou as heir, effectively uniting the Catholic kingdoms of France and Spain. In May 1702, a coalition of English, Dutch and German powers led by the newly installed Queen Anne of England, declared war on France and Spain, resulting in the bloody continental War of the Spanish Succession. In the colonies, the related Queen Anne's War followed the European alignments of the England versus France and Spain, giving the war a distinctively Protestant versus Catholic shaping.

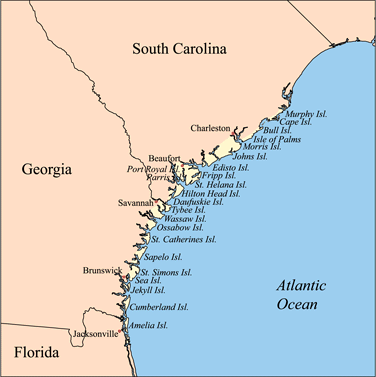
The Sea Islands, of which Amelia is the southernmost island.

In La Florida, Queen Anne's War was essentially already underway with the May, 1702 English-backed Creek raid on Mission Santa Fé de Teleco and the Spanish retaliation for it at the, disastrous for them, October 1702 Battle of the Blankets The next hostilities came along the Atlantic Coast with an Anglo-Indian invasion of Amelia Island and St. Augustine itself. While promising participants in the raids "free plunder and a share of all slaves," on August 26, 1702, the Carolina House of Commons required of all members the oath of "Supremacy and allegiance" to the "Kingdome of England," which included the Declaration,

"I ___ do Solemnly and Sincerely in the presence of God proffess [sic] testify and declare that I do believe that in the Sacrement [sic] of the Lords [sic] Supper there is not any Transubstantiation of the Elements of bread and Wine into the Body and blood of Christ at or after ye Consecration thereof by any person whatsoever And that the Invocation or Adoration of the Virgin Mary or any other Saint and the Sacrifice of the mass as they are now used in the Church of Rome are Superstitious and Idolatrous and I do Solemnly in the presence of God proffess [sic], Testify and declare that I do make this Declaration and every part thereof in the plain and ordinary Sense of the words read unto me as they are Com'only understood by English Protestants without any Evasion, Equivocation, or mantal [sic] reservation whatsoever and without any Dispensation already granted me ffor [sic] this purpose by the Pope or any other Authority or person..."

In a display of the seriousness of the oath, in September 1702 as the English at Charleston prepared for the invasion of Florida, a concern arose over a certain Indian trader, Joshua Brinan, who was associated with the Yamasee. Brinan was suspected of being a "Papist." To clear his name, Brinan offered to take the "Oath of Allegiance and Abjuration" denying the any rightful claim to the English Crown of the Catholic "James the Pretender," i.e., the Catholic claimant to the English throne, James Francis Edward Stuart, son of the deposed James II, whom Catholic supporters called James III. Anti-Catholicism justified and guided English Carolina actions, as well as to divide and define divisions between Native tribes. European religious divisions were amplified in Indian alignments and intertribal warfare.

=== Destruction of Isla Santa Maria (Amelia Island) missions (1702) ===
As news of the European war arrived to the English colony at Charleston in August 1702, the colonial assembly met to plan an invasion of Spanish Florida, which was approved in September. The next month Carolina Governor, "Colonel" James Moore assembled a force of about 500 English and 370 mostly Yamasee Indians, and sailed from Port Royal on November 2. The next day, a portion of the force attacked a Spanish garrison on what they called "Isla Santa Maria," now Amelia Island, and ransacked Mission San Pedro de Tupiqui. Inhabitants fled to the missions of San Catalina and San Felipe at the southern end of the island, or fled the island altogether, and in the panic the Spanish and Indians were unable to defend the remaining missions, which were incompletely fortified, despite efforts as late as 1700 to build them up. The missions on Isla Santa Maria were destroyed and never rebuilt. After the Spanish evacuated Amelia Island, the Spanish commander ordered reinforcements to San Juan del Puerto on present-day Fort George Island at the mouth of St. John's river, where Fr. Pareja had first rendered the Timucuan language using the Spanish alphabet early in the 17th century. The reinforcements never made it, and the Mission was sacked by the English. The Mission was partially rebuilt by the Spanish in 1715, but it never regained its former importance. None of the Martyrs of La Florida were killed in the English actions on Amelia Island.

=== Siege of St. Augustine (1702) ===
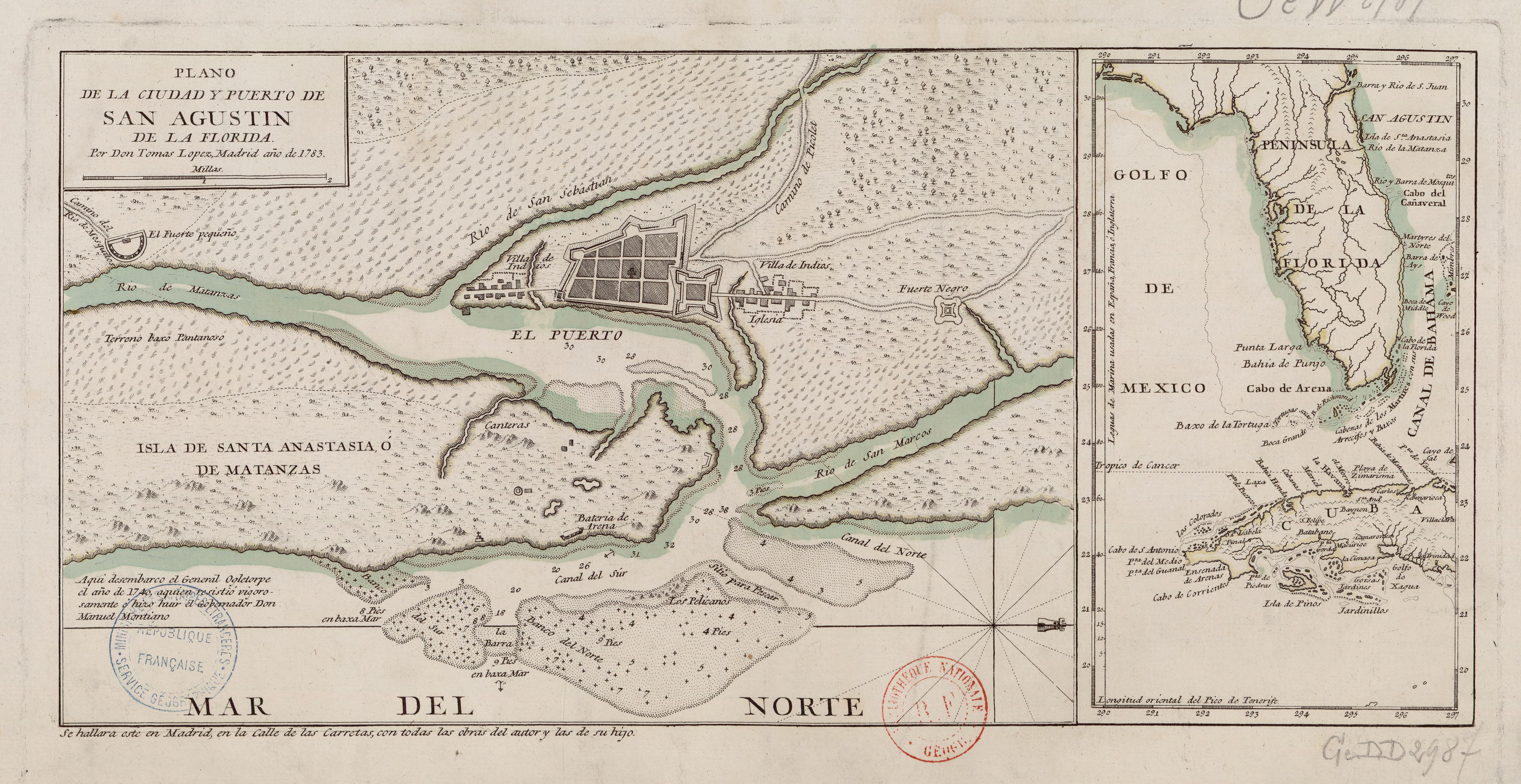
Plano de la ciudad y puerto de San Augustin de la Florida – por Don Tomas Lopez. Mission Nombre de Dios is marked on the map as "Villa de Indios".

After sacking the missions on the coastal islands, the English colonial ground force made its way towards St. Augustine, attacking Mission Nombre de Dios, the oldest operating Mission up to that time, and then St. Augustine itself. The attacks on all the missions had an ostensible military purpose in denying Spanish use of them as military facilities, but that purpose was limited, whereas the symbolic destruction of Catholic installations was the larger goal. The English were shocked by the size of the church, "large enough to entertaine Seven or Eight hundred men." The mission was torched and destroyed, including the Shrine of Our Lady of La Leche, which had been built in 1609 (the Shrine would suffer complete destruction by the English in 1728). The nearby town of St. Augustine was also destroyed, with the large Church and Franciscan friary and its chapel burned, leaving only a burnt but yet standing chapel of Nuestra Señora de la Soledad and some "houses of no value."

The Spanish Governor José de Zúñiga first learned of the English plans for invasion from a messenger arriving on October 26 from San Luis de Apalachee, the regional capital at present Tallahassee, with news relayed there by a converted Chacato woman who had visited family in western Georgia and witnessed a Native council discussing the English plans to attack the Apalachee Province and St. Augustine. Upon the November 3 invasion of Isla Santa Maria, Initial preparations turned into active defensive measures, primarily to evacuate the missions and St. Augustine into the formidable Castillo de San Marcos just outside of the town. Zúñiga organized his diverse collection of Spanish, Natives, and Blacks into defensive roles. The English under Governor Moore, meanwhile, sailed to St. Augustine and in coordination with the land forces, commenced a siege while razing St. Augustine, which the Spanish had partly torn down to keep from use by the English.

The English cannon had no effect upon the stone fort, and neither did an attempted a "Trojan Horse" scheme with a Yamasee couple who entered the fort as refugees to try to blow the fort's powder magazine, which illustrates the ethnographic awareness of the Spanish, as the Governor was suspicious of them. When a Spanish fleet arrived from Havana on December 28, the English scuttled their boats and retreated back to Charleston by land. Before leaving they torched remaining buildings, including a church. Among the destruction was the burning of a Bible because it was written in Latin. Upon their arrival to Charles Towne, riots broke out over the failure to take St. Augustine and bring back booty.

== Apalachee Massacre & subsequent attacks (1704-1706) ==
=== Background, 1701-1703 ===
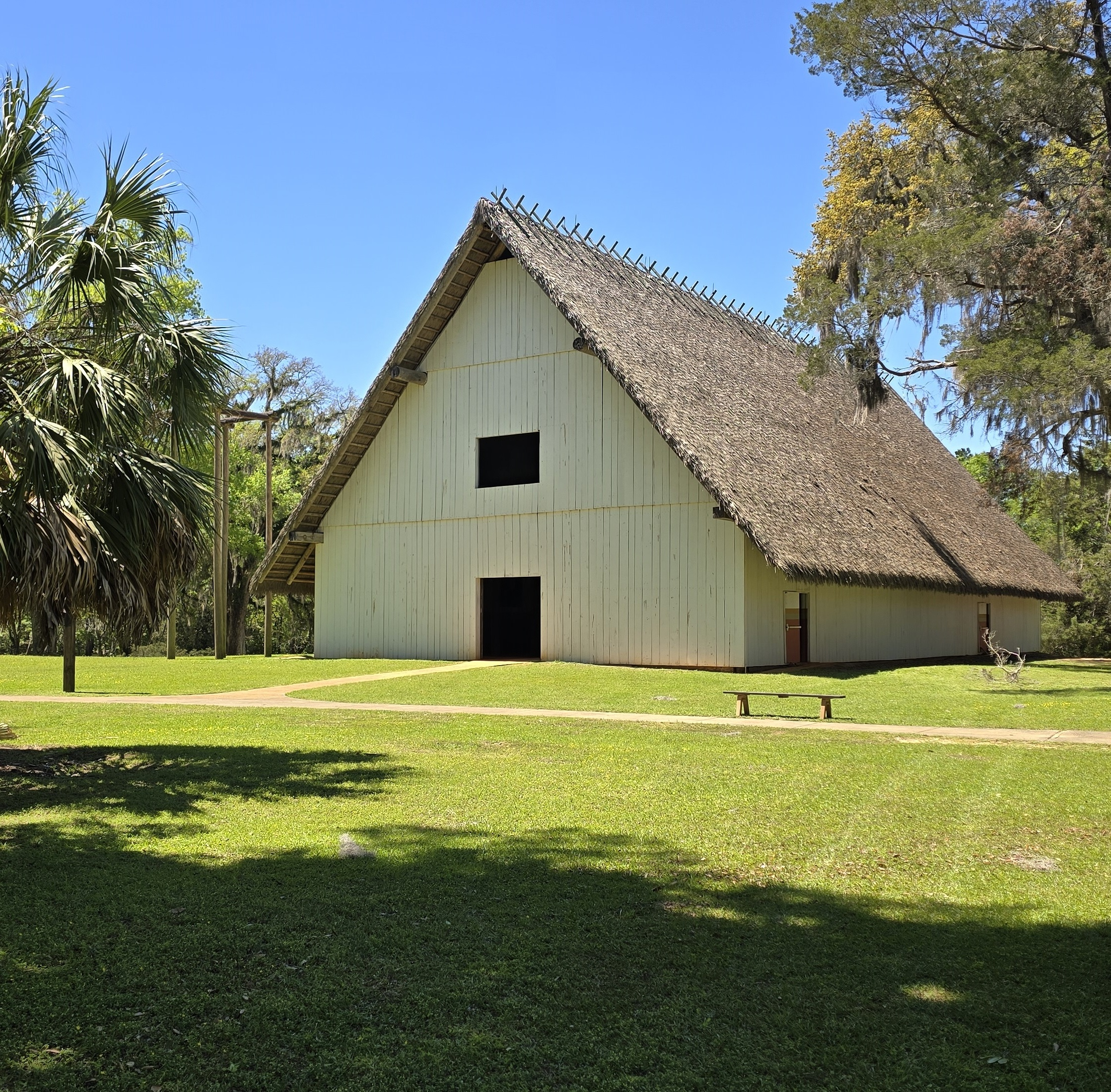
Mission San Luis – Reconstructed Franciscan Church

Into the late 1600s, while balancing the interests of Apalachee Mission Indians with those of Spanish settlers and the trade relations of both with English-allied Creek, Spanish officials faced increasing incursions by those tribes from Georgia territories. Historian John Hann notes that by 1676, the slave raids that had been ongoing for "a considerable period of time" increased, "Stimulated perhaps by the growing English demand for Indian slaves, the raiders became bolder." A January 1701 report by a Spanish inspector general raised concerns over Apalachee trade agreements with "the pagan villages influenced by the English, who have free commerce with them," particularly over keeping pack animals and firearms from the English-allied tribes, which were meanwhile being used to sell captured Apalachee to the English.

In 1701, in response to Spanish attempts to prohibit trade that might benefit the English, an Apalachicola tribe seized several Apalachee Catholic traders, an incident that was a precursor to the raid on Mission San Tomás de Santa Fé the next year. In addition to that raid, the English-backed Creek led several more slaving and raiding expeditions into the Apalachee and Timucuo provinces with 1703 with attacks upon Mission San Joseph de Ocuia (or Ocuya) in Apalachee and in Timucua San Pedro de Potohiriba along El Camino Real and possibly Mission San Francisco de Potano, taking, according to the Florida Governor Joseph de Zúñiga y Zérda, 500 Indians as slaves.

After the failed siege of St. Augustine, the Carolina Governor James Moore resigned in disgrace. To restore his reputation, in 1703 he presented a new plan to attack Spanish Florida, now in the Apalachee Province along the panhandle. As opposed to the 1702 invasion which left the Carolina Province in debt, Moore promised to finance the mission entirely from loot and slaves. With the assembly's September 1703 approval, Moore led 50 English colonists to central Georgia, where he recruited about 1,000 Creek and Yamasee warriors for war on Apalachee Catholics. In late December 1703 or early January 1704, Moore's army arrived to the Apalachee Province, which a friendly 1779 biography described as having in purpose,

Mr. Moore determined to chastise [the Apalachee], and for this purpose marched at the head of a body of white men and Indian allies, into the heart of their settlements. Wherever he went he carried fire and sword along with him and struck terror into his enemies.

Moore's invasion of the Spanish Apalachee Province, marked by the Apalachee massacre of January 25–27, 1704, with subsequent attacks that June and July, and carried on through raids primarily by Moore's Indian allies through 1706, effectively ended the missionary system in the region. The year before the Apalachee Massacre, in 1703, the new Governor of Carolina, Nathaniel Johnson began organizing Anglican missions and overall Anglicization of the province, which would be fully implemented in the 1704 Exclusion Act which required membership in the Church of England for all government officers and members of the assembly. When Moore, an Anglican, in 1704 torched Apalachee churches and enslaved Christianized Natives, he was acting within a well-articulated Anglican view that saw the Catholic missions as the enemy. In 1707, Carolina colony Captain Thomas Nairne appealed to the Society for the Propagation of the Gospel for missionaries for Apalachee Indians:

"We have had a great instance lately what mighty influences the Spanish friars had upon the Indians of Saint James and Apalahia who though they saw their countries all fired and themselves daily killed and carried away [as] slaves by other Indians yet they maintained their fidelity and friendship to the Spaniards to the last. . . . These people have had Christian churches among them for an 100 years . . . they did not leave until absolutely forced . . . . What a good fight we have been fighting to bring so many people from something of Christianity to downright barbarity and heathernism."

=== La Concepción de Ayubale Mission (January 25, 1704) ===
On January 25, 1704, and the colonial force attacked the La Concepción de Ayubale mission while the Native forces raided surrounding villages. The Mission was not insubstantial, with a recorded population of 800 in 1675. The Franciscan friar Fr. Angel Miranda, who had remained with the village unlike other priests who fled the region upon news of the invasion, organized a defense of the village, first behind wooden stockades, then from within the Church compound itself, to where the initial defense had allowed Fr. Miranda to gather the Mission's people. With muskets and bows, the Franciscan and his Native converts, including women and children, held off the English for nine hours, including to halt an assault with axes upon the church doors, during which fourteen English were wounded. Father Miranda surrendered only after running out of powder and arrows, by which time the English had already set the thatch roof on fire with burning arrows. During the fighting the Spanish side lost 24 men. Surrendering were 27 men and 58 women and children, who were harshly bound. Another group of Apalachee converts were taken prisoner outside the immediate church compound. Some of the captured were taken away, the others, including Fr. Miranda, were held through the night by the English who regrouped at the Mission for the night.

News of the attack reached Mission San Luis de Talimali, seat of the Province of Apalachee, about 24 miles away. Captain Juan Ruíz Mexía quickly mustered a force of 30 Spanish cavalry and 400 Apalachee. The force marched into the night of the 25th, spending the night at the village of Patale, not far from Ayubale. Early the morning of January 26, the Patale Mission priest, Franciscan Fr. Juan de Parga Araujo, preached in Apalachee for an hour to prepare them for the coming attack and possible martyrdom, which he said he would "gladly" join them in. Urged by a deputy not to join in the attack, he replied that he "had to go with his children and accompany them to the death." He would be martyred the next day.

=== Antonio Inija and the martyrs of the Battle of Ayubale (January 26, 1704) ===
The morning of January 26, Captain Mexía's forces approached Ayubale and encountered the English and their Native army, whom the Spanish drove back into Mission Ayubale, where the English gathered in defense at the council house. A second assault drove the English back again to the council house, but an English counter-attack wounded and knocked Captain Mexía from his horse, leading to confusion among the Spanish. Mexía and up to eight other Spanish soldiers were captured. Though unarmed, Fr. Parga was shot as he approached and was thrown into a canebrake. Two Spanish soldiers heard his cries and went to aid him but were killed in the attempt to rescue him. Upon depletion of their ammunition, the remaining Spanish and Apalachee fled to Mission Santa Cruz y San Pedro de Alcántara de Ychuntafun, and met with a Spanish Captain, Manuel Solana, who was bringing more munitions. Upwards of two hundred Apalachee were killed in the fighting. Moore claimed that 168 Apalachee were "killed and taken" and that he lost 11 "of my Indians." At some point Fr. Parga was subjected to a gruesome mutilation. His severed head was brought into the council house by the English Native allies, and his corpse was found later, naked and missing a leg, having been tossed into the thicket.

At least three Apalachee Catholics from Mission San Luis, Antonio Inija, Cuipa Feliciano, and Cui Domingo, were tied to stakes which were set afire by the English Native allies. Others were tied to trees. Targeted as a leader, Antonio Inija was burned slowly, "from morning to sunset," while he "preached long sermons to the pagans" and, as related by a witness, exhorting his captors that,

they should kill him, he would die consoled, in that as a Christian he would go to enjoy God, while they would go to hell, and that the Most Holy Virgin was helping him and appeared near.

Two other Apalachee also taunted the English as they died, Feliciano at the stake and Domingo, who was slashed with knives and tortured with burning splinters inserted into his wounds, a torture also inflicted upon Antonio Inija. Fr. Miranda begged mercy for his people, saying they were Christian and undeserving of such cruelty. Moore replied that he could not control his Native forces. Nevertheless, Fr. Miranda's intervention saved other lives, as he unbound his native parishioners while berating his captors for their barbarities, belying Moore's claim that he could not control the Creeks. The English sent Father Miranda and Captain Meixa to retrieve a ransom in exchange for sparing the village. Although the captain in charge at Mission San Luis refused to pay the ransom, Moore decided against marching upon the capital and instead used the time to recover from his own losses at Ayubale.

=== San Pedro y San Pablo de Patale (June 3, 1704) ===
After the January assaults, Moore drove his captives back to Carolina as slave booty, though leaving a small English force in the Apalachee or Georgia area. Upon Moore's departure, a Franciscan friar at the nearest mission site went to Ayubale to retrieve Fr. Parga's body, and there found its mutilated state. A small Spanish and Indian party later returned there to bury the Christians and found on the bodies much evidence of torture. One of the Spanish testified that "they found many burned bodies and [those ] of some women pierced by sticks and half roasted, many children impaled on poles, and others killed with arrows, their arms and legs cut off."

Late June, the English-allied Creek and Yamasee launched new assaults, the first coming on June 3 at San Pedro y San Pablo de Patale at midnight. Fr. Manuel de Mendoza responded to a call at the door of his convent by an Apalachee who cried out, "Good, you may open, Father, I am Fulano [so and so]; you do not know me; but look, we will not do you harm." Fr. Mendoza, known for his charity to the poor, opened a window and was shot to death. The attack commenced, and many villagers were taken captive, the stockade taken, and the convent burned. Mendoza's charred body was found later beneath a burned wall, bearing his Rosary and crucifix, which was melted upon his body by the fire. His Native sacristan was also killed, and a Native woman and a two year old who were taken from the Mission as captives were killed within a few days. Fr. Mendoza and the Sacristan, woman and two year old are among the Martyrs of La Florida.

=== San Pedro y San Pablo de Patale (July 4, 1704) ===
On June 24, the invaders attacked San Juan de Aspalaga, taking all the villagers captive, as well as the stockade. The Aspalaga Mission was not inconsiderable, counting 800 residents in 1675, though by June 1704, many, or most, of the people would have fled. While Moore had left the capital mission at San Luis alone, the Spanish had not consolidated the regional Missions and villages there. With their hopes for the arrival of reinforcements raised on June 28, the Spanish set preparations for a counter-offensive. Learning of an impending attack upon the Mission at San Cosmo y San Damián de Escambe, this time with English raiders included, and despite celebrations for the "Feast of Saints John and Peter", the Spanish ordered the residents into the Mission's blockade, which protected all who did not remain outside the fortification, of which there were some.

The next day, the Spanish flushed out a small party who approached the capital San Luis, and learned that the English and Creek warriors had returned to Patale. With the small party of reinforcements who had arrived from Pensacola, on July 4 the Spanish gathered with Apalachee men to march on the English to recover the Patale mission. The group consisted of 4 Spaniards, 93 Natives with firearms and 60 with bows. The Apalachee refused to march if the Spanish rode horses, to which the Spanish captain agreed and marched dismounted. They faced a forewarned enemy of some English and 200 Creek. During the fighting, a rumor spread among the Apalachee that they had been surrounded, and in the panic they took or lost some of the Spanish horses. The battle turned to a rout.

Two days later, Spanish sentinels returned to scout the battle site, and discovered that two Christian dead on the field and charred bodies in the remnants of the village square, all bound to Crosses and some with their tongues and ears cut off. Among the martyred was don Pedro Marmolejo who had arrived with the reinforcements from Pensacola. He was found at the foot of a Cross. Another soldier, Balthasar Francisco, a native of the Canary Islands who had spent much time in the region, had preached in both Spanish and Apalachee as he was killed, much as had Antonio Inija:

Immediately following his capture, they cut out his tongue and eyes, cut off his ears, scalped him, and put a crown on him, which in Indian style is placed on the Indian warriors when they dance, and which they call tascayas. And they tied him to another cross, and slashed him all over and placed burning splinters in the wounds; and as soon as they set him afire, they mocked and insulted him, laughing on hearing what the said Balthazar Francisco told the pagans in the Spanish and Apalachian languages, [while] he called on the Most Holy Virgin to help him, for she would carry him to God with much pleasure from knowing that he would go to enjoy his holy glory. There were related many other things which the Indian prisoners who escaped stated they had heard from the said Balthazar Francisco until he died.

As related in the Spanish Governor's report,

During this cruel and barbarous martyrdom which the poor Apalachee Indians experienced, there were some of them who encouraged the others, declaring that through martyrdom they would appear before God; and to the pagans they said, "Make more fire so that our hearts may be allowed to suffer for our souls. We go to enjoy God as Christians."

The seventeen Catholics, two Spanish and fifteen Apalachee, are included in the Martyrs of la Florida.

=== Abandonment of Ivitachuco (1704) and martyrdom of Don Patricio (1706) ===
Two important missions untouched by the English and Creek through to the July 1704 attacks were the Spanish capital at San Luis de Talimali and Mission San Lorenzo de Ivitachuco, at the eastern border with Timucua province. San Luis de Talimali had been at the time of the 1539–1540 passage of the de Soto expedition the location of Apalachee center, called Anhaica. However, when the Franciscan Martín Prieto sent a peace mission to the region in 1608, Ivitachuco had become the Apalachee administrative center and was thus the key to the larger conversion of the Apalachee across the province. Though the Spanish moved their Apalachee province administrative center to the more centrally located San Luis, San Lorenzo de Ivitachuco remained an important locus for Catholic Apalachee with a population by 1675 of 1200, near to that of San Luis. By 1704, however, the population of Ivitachuco is estimated to have been about 400.

At the time of Moore's 1704 invasion, the cacique at Ivitachuco was the devoutly Catholic don Patricio Hinachuba, who was respected by the Apalachee and Spanish alike, as well as by Creek tribes from around the region. The St. Augustine "Defender of the Indians," don Antonio Ponce De León, stated that don Patricio was "the greatest of all of the caciques of the Province of Apalachee." The morning of the first attack on Ayubale, January 25, 1704, the English sent a detachment to Ivitachuco to demand a ransom lest it be attacked. Along with don Patricio, the Franciscan pastor at Ivitachuco Fr. Juan de Villalva, who was deeply dedicated to his people, agreed to surrender the Church ornaments and half the food stores in exchange for the safety of their people. It seems remarkable that Moore allowed this escape, though he also tried to extort a ransom from San Luis. However, as historian Mark Boyd points out, sparing the village was probably due to the reputation of don Patricio, who was held in esteem by even invading Creek tribes.

Mission San Lorenzo de Ivitachuco outlasted subsequent assaults of June and early July 1704, including having to hold out in the Mission's blockhouse during a Creek raid. Things fell apart quickly that month as the Spanish prepared to evacuate the region, deciding at a Council of War in St. Augustine on July 13 that "it would be better to withdraw without the few Indians who remain with the cacique." Deeming San Luis indefensible, the Spanish ordered it abandoned. The guns were spiked and the city destroyed. There were at the time 200 families living in San Luis, most of whom were evacuated to Pensacola, with the important Spanish officials and families sent on the vessel that had brought reinforcements from Pensacola. With San Luis abandoned, Ivitachuco had to be evacuated as well. Don Patricio, whose family was denied passage on the small vessel to Pensacola, affirmed his and his people's loyalty to Spain and the Catholic Church, telling them, according to notes from the Saint Augustine Council of war, that, Don Patricio,

would willingly come with his people to this city to die as a good vassal among the Spanish, and that the statues, ornaments, and other objects of the Divine Cult, and cattle, horses, cannons, pedreros, arms, and ammunition would be very advantageous.

The Council agreed to withdraw the Apalachee from Ivitachuco and Missions San Pedro and San Matheo to San Francisco Potano, to the west of St. Augustine. Into August, the Deputy Governor from Apalachee Province and a squad of Spanish soldiers, along with don Patricio, led a caravan of 400 with 600 cattle and the remaining ornaments and images from the Church at Ivitachuco. Governor Zúñiga had urged don Patricio to go to St. Augustine, but don Patricio decided to take advantage of a clear area called Abosaya, near mostly abandoned ranches east of San Francisco de Potano, not far from modern Gainesville. The Apalachee built up a town and fortifications, fully expecting more Creek raids, and named it Mission Ivitachuco de Abosaya. The expected Creek invasion came that August, ravaging the remaining settlements in Timucua and a nearby ranch, La Chua, that had a strong house held by a few Spanish soldiers. Though besieged for twenty days, the defenders of Ivitachuco de Abosaya held them off.

Realizing the situation was yet dire, in his letter to the Spanish king of September 15, 1704, Florida Governor Zúñiga complained that "not even the least relief has arrived." To defend what was left in Spanish Apalachee, he had asked for one hundred infantry "to relieve the Indians," but received only 47 from Havana, half of whom returned on the sloop. Desperate, the Governor issued letter of marque against Charleston, which forced the English into a truce that lasted through the Winter. On February 1, 1705, Creek invaders were spotted, so fifty Spanish soldiers under Captain Francisco de Florencia organized their defenses. In June, the danger seemed to have abated, but on August 20 a reinforced Creek army of 200 attacked Abosaya. Don Patricio had left for Saint Augustine to organize relief and supplies. During this time Captain Florencia wrote the Governor, "for God's sake take pity on these poor folk, for they can stand no more." On his return to the village, don Patricio found them desperate from the sieges and hungry from destroyed fields and stolen livestock. Another attack that September 1705 by what was reported to be 2,000 Creek destroyed La Chua. Unable to remain in the region, over the winter don Patricio led the Abosaya villagers towards St. Augustine, where they settled west of the city.

That spring of 1706, a Creek raid specifically targeted these remaining Apalachee Catholics and overran the settlement's defenses, capturing some, but outright massacring most, including don Patricio who, trying to protect children in the village, made a stand at nearby woods. In a review of the events of 1704–1706, Captain Florencia wrote to the Spanish king,

And in all these widespread dominions and provinces the law of God and preaching of the Holy gospel have ended, which over the span of more than 150 years the señores Kings our lords have propagated among these natives at such great cost to the Royal patrimony, who have suffered death as Christians.

=== Missions San Pedro de Potohiriba and San Mateo de Tolapatafi (Timucua, Florida, August, 1704) ===
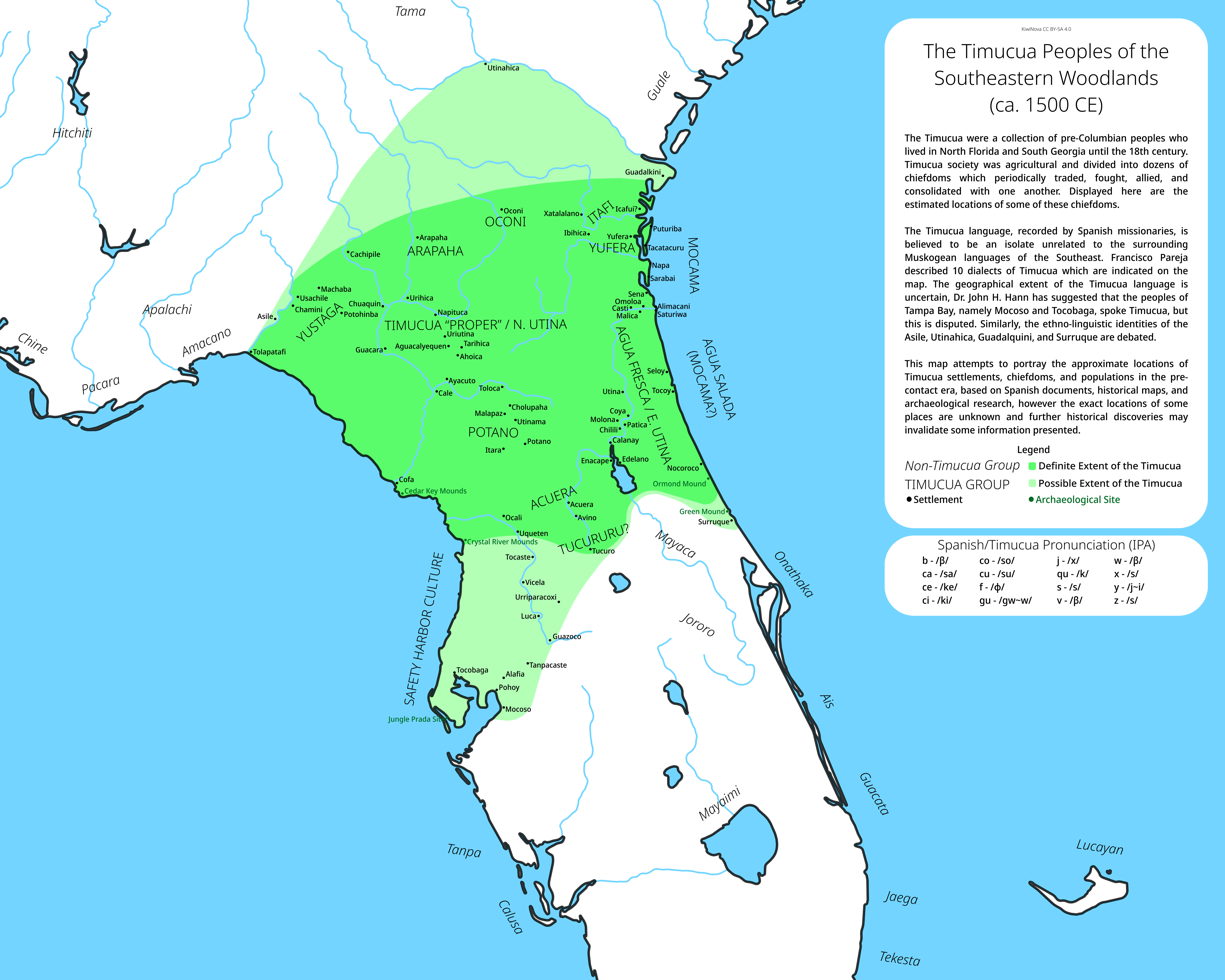
A map of the Timucua and surrounding groups.

The Anglo-Creek attacks in January and July 1704 were limited to the Apalachee province, the destruction of which the Carolina English raider Moore intended to halt the flow of provisions from the region to Saint Augustine. Timucua, though, became a next target for the Creek, who targeted two missions in the province, San Pedro de Potohiriba and San Matheo de Tolapatafi.

As Apalachee evacuated their homes, the western Timucua region and Missions absorbed the refugees. However, expanding the range of their profitable marauding across Apalachee, Creek raiders moved into Timucua territory and attacked the Missions in August 1704. While the Anglo-Creek goal was to kill or remove all Apalachee Catholics, as the refugees passed into Timucua province in late July or early August 1704, the Creek followed after them and attacked Timucuan Missions and people, as well. Apalachee caravan passed through, and devastated the settlements.

The assaults were as brutal as any of the other massacres in Apalachee, laying waste to the land and targeting Timucua Catholic caciques, whom they burned alive along with other faithful. Many of the Mission residents were carried off as slaves, but the Caciques and other Catholic Timucuans who refused to submit died defending their Missions and their faith. Fr. Prieto, the Franciscan scholar and linguist who had recorded the Timucuan language, wrote of them,

I have found many Indian men and women who confess and receive communion tearfully and in such a way that they are superior to many Spaniards. I even venture to say from experience that they respond to the mysteries of faith better than Spaniards who never think upon these things.

Missions Attacked or Destroyed leading up to and as a result of Moore's Invasion (1703–1704)
Mission Name	Status	Date / Notes
Santa Fé de Toloca	Destroyed	May 20, 1702
San Francisco de Potano	Destroyed	1703
San Pedro de Potohiriba	Raided	September 3, 1704
San Matheo de Tolapatafi	Raided	September 3, 1704
San Francisco de Oconi	Likely destroyed	No specific date given, probably 1704
San Juan de Aspalaga	Destroyed	June 23, 1704
San Joseph de Ocuia	Attacked	1703
San Pedro y San Pablo de Patale	Destroyed	June 3, 1704; site of battle and martyrdom of Fr. Mendoza, his sacristan, and 17 Spanish and Apalachee Catholics on July 4, 1704
San Antonio de Bacuqua	Probably destroyed	No specific date given
San Cosmo y San Damian de Escambé	Attacked	June 29, 1704
San Luis de Talimali (or San Luis de Apalachee)	Evacuated and destroyed by Spaniards	July 1704
San Lorenzo de Ivitachuco	Survived	Not attacked; the residents compounded with refugees to Timucua province in 1704
San Martín de Tomole	Probably destroyed	No specific date given
Santa Cruz y San Pedro de Alcántara de Ychuntafun (Capola)	Probably destroyed	No specific date given

Moore claimed to have taken 4,300 slaves, mostly women and children, and killed 1,100 people but only those "taken in the fight." However, since adult men were generally not taken as slaves, his claim to have killed 1,100 is certainly rather low.

== Subsequent Franciscan martyrs, 1704-1715 ==
Events of the Apalachee Massacre and the evacuations from Apalachee Province cascaded across the Spanish colony. To the east, Creek attacks destroyed the remaining Timucua Missions in central Florida and threatened St. Augustine itself. To the west, Spanish and Apalachee refugees who escaped to Pensacola also suffered continued attacks.

=== Captivity and martyrdom of Fr. Domingo Criado, 1704–1705 ===
Following the Apalachee Massacre of January, 1704, a group of friars at San Luis, the Spanish capital at Apalachee Province, signed a petition to the King of Spain requesting relief from the attacks. Among those to sign the document were Fr. Angel Miranda, who was present at the January 25, 1704 attack on La Concepción de Ayubale mission, and four of the Martyrs of La Florida, including Fr. Domingo Criado, who would resettle his mission to central Florida, suffer a Creek attack, and die in captivity as a result of the abuse he suffered.

Fr. Criado led Mission San Francisco de Oconi, located west of Ivitachuco and within the path of destruction of the Anglo-Creek invasion. Established possibly as early as 1612, the residents of the Mission Oconi considered themselves the first Catholic converts in Apalachee. With a population recorded in 1675 as 200, and growing to an estimated 400 by 1689, the Mission marked a significant Catholic presence in the region. The Mission was overrun during the Apalachee Massacre in 1704, but Fr. Criado and a number of residents escaped and "wandered in the forests," according to a Spanish report, ultimately settling in 1705 along a river about 26–30 miles east of St. Augustine. Fr. Criado could have returned to St. Augustine, but decided to stay with his flock. In the ongoing Creek raids, the site was attacked and the remaining Christians killed or, as was Fr. Criado, taken captive to present-day Macon, Georgia. One Apalachee captive escaped and reported that Fr. Criado had been stripped of his "holy habit", mocked, and served a "prolonged martyrdom" of several months before suffering his final death.

A broken sherd from a Spanish tinaja with the letters "Cria" was recovered by an archeologist in modern Jefferson County, Florida, at the likely site of Fr. Criado's original Mission San Francisco de Oconi, making it a potential second-class relic should the Cause of Martyrdom be adopted.

=== Fr. Augustin Ponce de León, St. Augustine, 1705 ===
Following the Apalachee Massacres, the 1705 Creek raids into Timucua province further alarmed the Spanish leadership at Saint Augustine. Though the raids were random and roving, not by flotilla or organized army as had been during the 1702 English attack upon Saint Augustine, approaching the environs of the capital, orders were sent to keep alert. The Spanish strategy was to put out fires with focused responses, given limited resources, where needed. To support the defense of Ivitachuco de Abosaya, a relief party of Spanish and Catholic Natives was raised at Saint Augustine. Soon after their departure, news came of another Creek attack upon a small fort called Salamototo. The Spanish party surprised and dispersed the invaders there, though at the same time another Creek raid fell upon one of the small Missions from which some of the relief forces had been raised. The Governor called them back for its defense. Captain Begembre's force pursued the Creek, who had taken women and children from the village which been left undefended. Accompanying Captain Begembre was the Franciscan Father Augustin Ponce de Leon, who had ministered to the Mission that was raided.

The Spanish encountered the Creek and their captives in a marsh north of Saint Augustine at the dawn of September 3. During the battle, Fr. Augustin ministered to the wounded with the Sacrament of Penance, while helping to liberate as many of the women and children as possible. Most of the captives were recovered, though not all, and Captain Begembre and Father Augustin both were killed in their defense. A Spanish report on the event noted,

and the said Fray Augustin, who went along to encourage the Spaniards and Indians of his force, seeking where the need to administer the sacrament of repentance to the wounded might exist, without exhibiting fear that they might kill him. As a good shepherd, he surrendered his soul in defense of his sheep and children of the mission in his charge, because, although he lost his life in pursuit and redemption of his children, as a consequence of his admonitions he succeeded in the recovery of the greater part of them, even though he could not effect it for all.

Fr. Augustin was born at St. Augustine in 1669, making him the first American-born priest in the modern continental United States.

== Martyrs at Pensacola and Mobile, 1712–1715 ==
=== Historical background ===
After the Apalachee Massacre and Creek raids in Timucua province, Florida Governor Zúñiga wrote to the Viceroy of New Spain,

I formally communicate to Your Excellency how the hostilities of the pagan Indians, led by the English have succeeded in depopulating the Province of Apalachee, together with the greater part of Timuqua [sic] which had remained of some consequence. They killed some and captured others, including some Spaniards, in the last encounter, and the remaining Indians have fled to Pensacola, according to the reports I have had..."

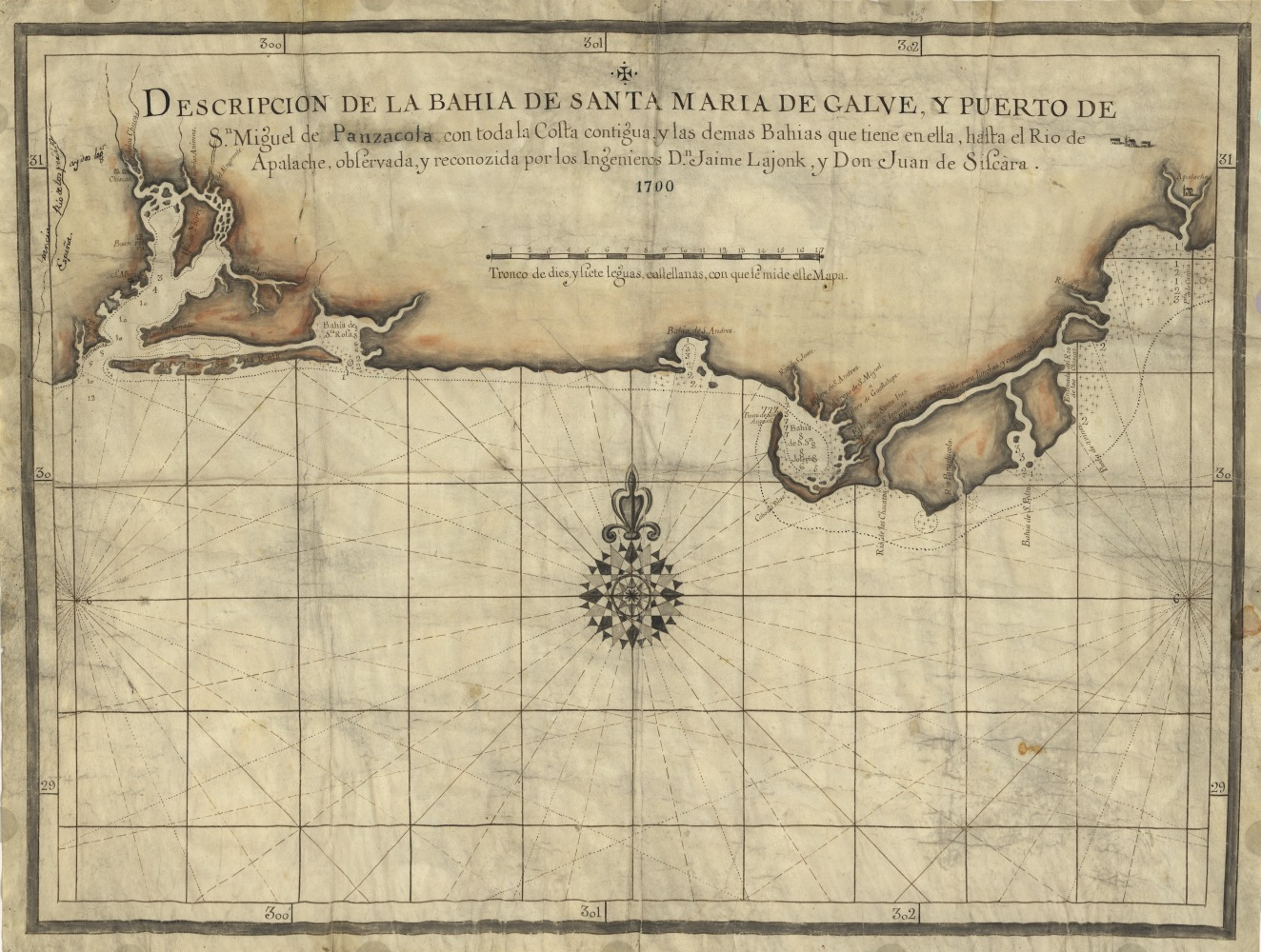
"Bahia Santa Maria de Galve y Puerto de San Miguel de Panzacola", 1700

For the Apalachee and Spanish who headed west after the Apalachee Massacre, the available destinations were the Spanish outpost at Pensacola, and recently established French installations at Fort Maurepas, constructed in 1699, and La Mobile, established in 1702 north of modern Mobile, Alabama. The Spanish settlement at Pensacola was called, Presidio Santa Maria de Galve. It was the second Spanish installment at Pensacola, the first having arrived under Tristán de Luna y Arellano in August 1559 with 1,500 settlers on twelve ships. The next month a hurricane destroyed the fleet and settlement, and the colony was abandoned within two years. After its rediscovery as the "Bahia de Panzacola" by a 1686 Spanish expedition under Juan Jordán de Reina, a more extensive Spanish exploratory expedition of 1693 christened the now-named Pensacola Bay, "Bahía Santa María de Galve," from which a later Spanish settlement drew its name.

In the spring of 1698, the Spanish Crown officially prioritized the establishment of a settlement at Pensacola Bay upon learning that the French were planning to settle in the region. Later that year, the Governor of St. Augustine also reported intelligence he had received that the English were planning to send French Huguenots to the region, which the English Carolina colony claimed as its own. In November 1698, the Spanish government expedited a mission of two merchant vessels and 52 soldiers to arrive quickly to Pensacola. A small garrison of Spanish and Apalachee were also sent to occupy the entrance to the bay in order to demonstrate to other European expeditions that the Spanish were already in place. On November 21, 1698, a second, fully supplied Spanish expedition of 357 arrived, including an Augustinian fleet chaplain and two Franciscan missionaries.

Selecting a more secure location on the mainland opposite the mouth of the bay, the Spanish settlement was built around a well-constructed wooden fort called Presidio San Carlos de Austria, likely named by or in deference to the fort's Austrian engineer. At about 330 feet square, the fort was large enough to house a church, the governor's house, barracks and a hospital, all of which indicates the importance to which the Spanish gave to its presence, especially since recruitment to serve there proved difficult. By 1700 there were 180 residents in and around Pensacola, a population that grew to 730 in 1705 following the Apalachee exodus, although that count included a group of shipwreck victims at the time. The captain in charge of supplies estimated there were 200 refugees from Apalachee. A count of the Spanish refugees from Apalachee province came to 55 men and 31 women, though that did not include those who had already left for Veracruz. Subsequent Creek and English attacks in 1707 greatly reduced the population, but by 1712 there were again around five hundred inhabitants. After more raids that year, the population was reduced to four hundred by 1713.

In 1701, the Pensacola Governor Andrés de Arriola built a hospital just outside the fort, called Nuestra Señora de las Angustias (Our Lady of Afflictions), also called Hospital de Santa María de Galve. It was staffed by two friars from the Brothers Hospitallers of Saint John of God ("San Juan de Dios" in Spanish). Dedicated to serving the sick and afflicted, the Hospitallers were particularly useful for Spanish colonial outposts, as the Brothers served the dual function of priest and surgeon. An outbreak of Yellow fever in 1702 led the Governor to expand the hospital, which lay outside the Presidio. In 1705 several priests arrived to Pensacola, including three who had been working with the Calusa tribes in southern Florida since 1696 and, by 1707, the Franciscan Tiburcio Osorio, who had been working in Apalachee during the 1704 Massacre. The Catholic Apalachee cacique from San Luis de Talimali, don Joseph de la Cruz Cui, and his Apalachee refugees built their own settlement in 1705 across the Perdido River, consisting of 120 adults and 80 children. Upon arrival, the cacique wrote the Viceroy of New Spain requesting supplies, including church ornaments and a priest.

=== Presidio Santa Maria de Galve, raids and persistence, 1707–1719 ===
In August 1707, a siege was raised against Presidio Santa Maria de Galve by about 300 Creek warriors who were supported by the English. During the raids many of the Apalachee and a few other Natives from the Chacato tribe who lived and worked around the Presidio were able to take refuge at the fort, though a number of women and children were taken away. A Spanish sally the next day to retrieve them was unsuccessful. The fort itself held off the attackers, who remained nearby for a month, keeping outside the range of the fort's guns and attacking anyone who left the protection of the Presidio. Throughout the siege the Spanish faced multiple crises, including a lack of oil to keep that altar lamp burning, which was necessary for the priests to administer the Viaticum to the dying. The English were intent upon driving out the Spanish, and by late November the Spanish learned that a hundred English along with some French Huguenots and a band of Creeks were preparing another assault. Upon arrival, the English commander sent a letter demanding surrender, which the Spanish commander replied he couldn't read as it was in English. Agreeing to communicate in French, the Spanish commander declared that all those inside the fort were prepared to die in its defense. The Spanish guns held off two nights of attacks, which were abandoned during the second night by the Creek after their principal chief was killed.

Following the 1707 raids, the fort itself became a hybrid garrison and village that within its walls supported a varied population of officers, soldiers, skilled and unskilled workers, wives and children, and laborers, all of whom were there on assignment or orders, and not for permanent settlement. As indicated by food rations records, Native residents numbered around 80, though that number certainly fluctuated over time. The community was served by, generally, three priests. The archeological record shows typical social organization, orderly burials, and an unusual reliance upon imported goods, especially from the French at Mobile, indicating an inability to develop a self-sufficient economy. As a result, the settlement was, according to the archeological record, "a community under stress."

Nevertheless, the Spanish presence was sustained throughout ongoing raids and colonial competition. In 1715, following a peace agreement with the Creeks, the village of Santa Maria was rebuilt outside the fort, likely accompanied with renewed efforts at farming, which had proven difficult in the past due to the conditions of the land. In late 1718, however, another European conflict intervened, the War of the Quadruple Alliance, with Spain and France now antagonists, news of which was first brought to the Spanish at Pensacola with a French attack in May 1719. In a second attack that September, the French burned the Presidio, which was not reoccupied by the Spanish until 1723 at the conclusion of the European war.

=== Fr. Phelipe Orbalaes, priest and physician (Pensacola, 1712) ===
In May 1707, Father Phelipe Orbalaes arrived to replace an incompetent surgeon. Another Hospiteller, Fr. Juan de Chavarria, arrived at Fr. Orbalaes' request. By 1709 Fr. Orbalaes had become Prior. He worked to overcome shortages in medicines, blankets and other supplies, as well as poor construction of the hospital. He worked with the new Governor to plead with authorities in Mexico to send the sick out of Pensacola, but concerns over replacements inhibited their ability to send them away. The hospital had forty beds but frequently far more patients who were forced to sleep on the ground. On top of the internal problems, Creek raids continued through to 1711, though none as organized as those of 1707.

On September 1, 1712, three bands of one hundred Creek each attacked Pensacola, catching a group of Spanish who were outside the fort. The Creek ambush overwhelmed the Spanish. As he tended to the wounded and dying, Fr. Orbalaes, physician and priest, was killed, despite his peaceful actions as, or because he was, a priest. The local Governor Gregorio de Salinas Varona described the event and martyrdom to the Viceroy of New Spain:

In the skirmish that occurred on the first day of the current month outside the plaza of the presidio of San Carlos de Austria, Fray Phelipe Orbalaes y Abreo, a professed religious of the Order of San Juan de Dios, emerged not with the intent to fight but with the zeal of his ministry, carrying the viaticum and sacred vessels to assist the wounded. Those enemies, upon seeing him unarmed and in such a heavenly endeavor, fired several shots at him, taking his life on the field. His body remained alongside the sick and soldiers he had aided, leaving a deep sorrow among all for the loss of such a pious doctor and man of notable virtue.

=== Fr. Tiburcio de Osorio (1706–1715) ===
In the 1712 raid, Fr. Osorio was taken captive along with 23 others. As the English had by then forbade the Creek from burning prisoners alive, they were not immediately killed and instead likely taken away to Upper Creek territory near modern-day Montgomery, Alabama. Fr. Osorio died in captivity by 1715, a martyr for his faith.

Born in Havana, Franciscan Father Tiburcio de Osorio had joined his fellow Franciscans in Apalachee Province, and was there during the English and Creek attacks of 1704. Fr. Osorio signed along with fellow martyr, Fr. Domingo Criado, the petition to the King of Spain for relief, dated February 6, 1704. After the attacks, Fr. Osorio returned to Cuba but was again in Florida in 1707 at Pensacola where he is recorded as having written a letter requesting liturgical supplies for Mass and the Last Rites.

== Apalachee peoples aftermath ==
Of those not taken as slaves, many from the 1704–1705 Apalachee exodus to the west ended up in Spanish Pensacola or French Mobile, while refugees to the east ultimately settled around Spanish St. Augustine. Other Apalachee chose to migrate voluntarily to live in Creek territory within the English colonial realm. Those taken for work on Carolina plantations suffered conditions far worse than any experienced under the Spanish in Apalachee. In 1710, a free Catholic Apalachee named Adrian escaped Carolina to St. Augustine where he was gladly welcomed. Of the estimated 1,300 free Apalachee migrants to the Carolina, only half survived, living in four villages.

The Apalachee Massacre effectively ended the era of Spanish missions in the homelands of the indigenous people in La Florida, though refugee missions remained huddled around the protected Spanish enclaves at St. Augustine and Pensacola through the Spanish evacuation to Havana and Veracruz in 1763, and in French Louisiana near Mobile through the same year. The Apalachee in Spanish territory chose to exile themselves with the Spanish in Cuba and Mexico, while those living near Mobile moved west into newly Spanish Louisiana west of the Mississippi along the Red River, where their descendants still live today.

== See also ==
- Ajacán Mission
- Antonio Inijia
- Apalachee
- Apalachee massacre
- Catholic Church in the United States
- Fort Mose
- Georgia Martyrs
- List of missions in Spanish Florida
- Luis Cáncer
- Mission Nombre de Dios
- Pedro Menéndez de Avilés
- St. Augustine, Florida
- Spanish missions in Florida
