= Council house (disambiguation) =

A council house is a form of public housing in the United Kingdom.

Council house or Council House may also refer to:

== Government ==
- Council House, the administrative headquarters of a British local authority:
  - Council House, Birmingham, the home of Birmingham City Council, England
  - Council House, Bristol, the former name of the seat of local government in Bristol, England
  - Council House, Coventry, the headquarters of Coventry City Council, England
  - Council House, Malvern, the headquarters of Malvern Hill District Council, England
  - Council House, Nuneaton, the headquarters of Nuneaton & Bedworth Borough Council, England
  - Nottingham Council House, the city hall of Nottingham, England
- Council House, New Delhi, the former name of the Old Parliament House, New Delhi
- Council House, Perth, the headquarters of the City of Perth, Australia
- Council House (Salt Lake City), temporary home of the Utah Territorial Government, US
