= Anarchism in Canada =

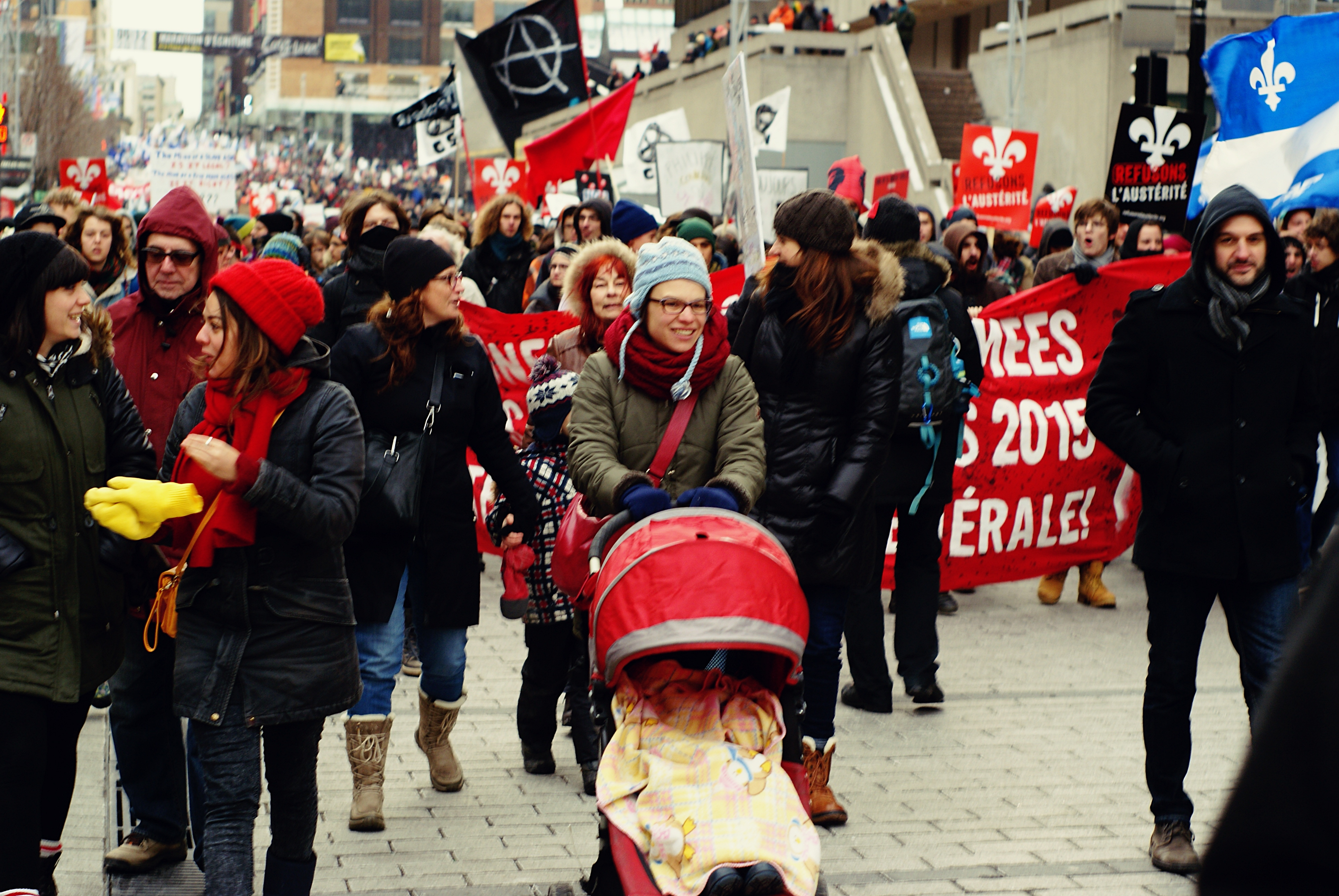
Anarchists in Quebec at a demonstration

Anarchism in Canada (French: Anarchisme) has been a historically marginal movement, initially being maintained by small, mostly immigrant groups. It briefly gained relevance with the rise of the Industrial Workers of the World in the 1910s and Les Automatistes in the 1940s. It experienced a revival during the late 20th century, agitating within the new social movements of the period, while the Squamish Five carried out a series of bombings. Contemporary Canadian anarchism has been involved in the indigenous land rights and anti-globalization movements, and has established projects throughout the country.

== History ==
Anarchism has historically been a small, relatively marginal movement in Canada, gaining little support outside of small groups in major cities. Self-organization played an important part in village life during the settling of the West (Saskatchewan, specifically) as the State was distant and infrastructure-related matters such as maintaining roads, building bridges and schools, and organizing local governance and social life needed to be tackled through spontaneous self-organization.

=== Early movement ===
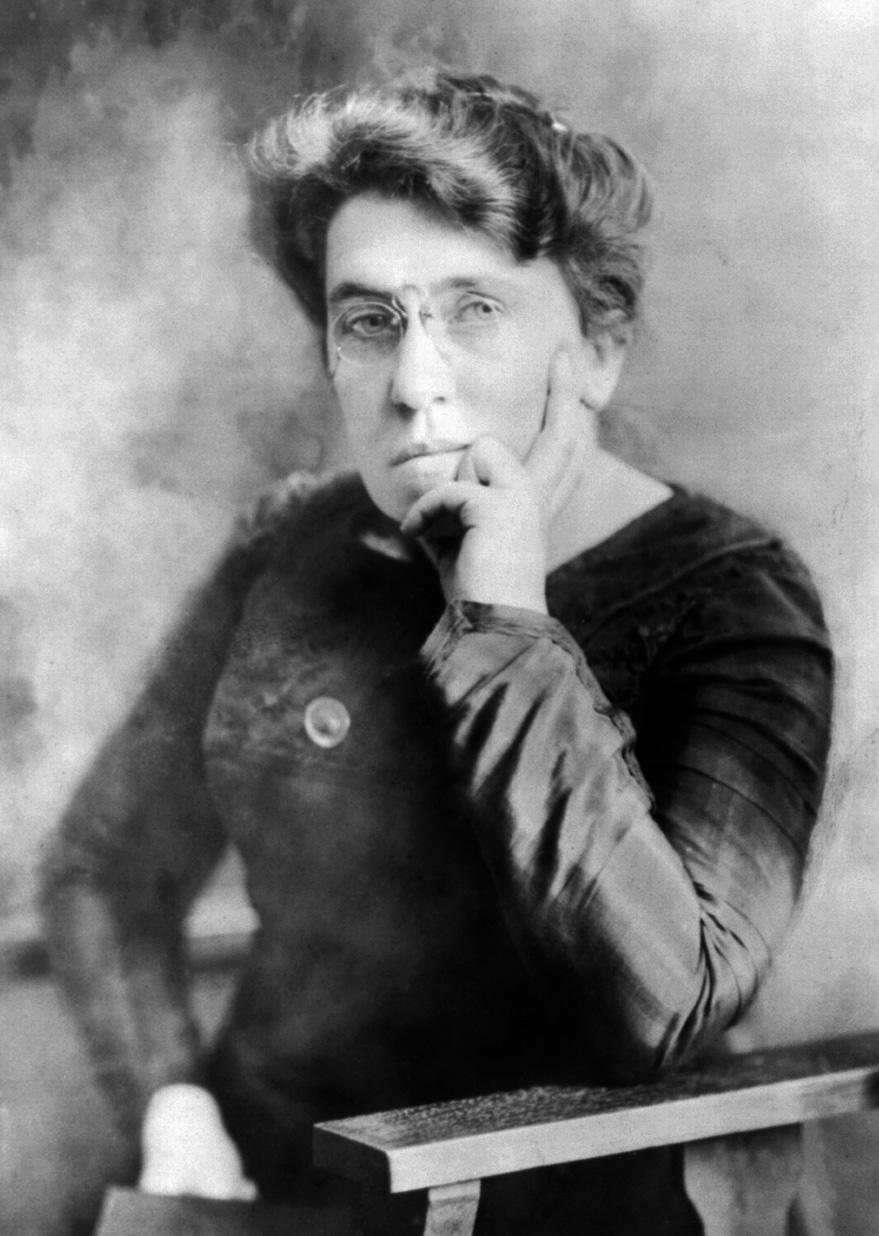
Emma Goldman was active in the anarchist movement in Toronto in the 1930s

Following the suppression of the Paris Commune, a number of its participants fled to North America, where they established anarchist-communist journals that gained a small circulation in Quebec. In 1897, Peter Kropotkin visited the country and recommended that the Doukhobors, a religious minority facing persecution in Russia, move to the Canadian Prairies.

=== Early twentieth century and decline ===
In the early 20th century, some small anarchist groups were established in Canada's largest cities. By the outbreak of World War I, the syndicalist Industrial Workers of the World (IWW) had organised thousands of members in Canada, largely unskilled and migrant workers, but it was suppressed over the course of the war. After more reformist members broke away from the IWW and established the One Big Union (OBU), which carried out general strikes throughout the country, the Canadian IWW continued on throughout the 1920s as a relatively small organisation.

During the 1920s and 1930s, the Canadian anarchist movement was largely maintained by Jewish immigrants in major cities. Emma Goldman was important in organizing anarchist societies among Jewish, Italians, and Ukrainian immigrant communities. Goldman had a heavy hand in establishing societies such as the Free Society Group and the Toronto Libertarian Group in Toronto. Following the Spanish Civil War, they were joined by German, Italian and Spanish anarchist refugees, although many fell away from anarchist activism by the late 1940s. According to George Woodcock, the beginning of World War II essentially ended the classical anarchist movement in Canada as Goldman died in 1940 in Toronto and members disagreed on support for the war against the axis powers.

During the post-war period, anarchism was largely associated with the Quebecois Automatiste art scene, with Paul-Émile Borduas, Jean-Paul Riopelle and Françoise Sullivan issuing a manifesto which called for the promotion of anarchism and the arts.

=== Minor revival in the 1970s ===
Anarchism saw a revival in the new social movements of the 1970s and 1980s, including the Canadian environmentalist, feminist and indigenous land rights movements, while several anarchist journals circulated throughout the late 20th century. Violent direct action groups also formed during this time, with the Direct Action group carrying out bombings against a BC Hydro power station and a Litton Industries plant; all five of its members were arrested for the attacks in 1983.

Canada also saw the rise of anarchists in academic institutions. Notably, George Woodcock was a historian, literary critic, and philosopher who was an active anarchist activist in Canada during World War II up until the 1980s. He is most known outside of Canada for his book Anarchism: A History of Libertarian Ideas and Movements, which was published in 1962. Woodcock opposed the civic nationalism promoted by Pierre Trudeau in the 1960s and 70s and advocated for Canada to become an "anti-nation" defined by direct democracy and decentralization.

The 1970s also saw the rise of new anarchist student movements in Canada. For instance, Rochdale College was formed in 1968 as an experiment in student-run alternative education and co-operative living. Rochdale College was a facet of the rising anti-authority and anti-institutionalism movement that began to emerge as a part of the hippie movement in Canada. Ultimately, Rochdale College closed in 1975 due to clashes with the police, rising drug use within the building, and financial troubles.

=== 21st century ===
By the turn of the 21st century, the anarchist movement had begun to grow, with anarchist bookshops, cooperatives and social centres spreading throughout the country, while regularly anarchist bookfairs were held. The Media Collective was a social group based in Toronto between 1994 and 1996 whose events included guerrilla performances and free vegan meals from Food Not Bombs. One of its splinter groups, TAO Communications ("The Anarchy Organization"), opposed transnational neoliberalism and Silicon Valley views of capitalism by providing unionized communications service: both communication logistics during actions and reports on police. Anarchists played a role in the Canadian anti-globalization movement, disrupting the APEC Canada 1997 summit and the 3rd Summit of the Americas in 2001. Anarchist solidarity with the indigenous rights movement also led to the development of an "anarcho-indigenism", notably by the Mohawk activist Taiaiake Alfred, who sought to refine anarchist practice for the indigenous context.

In the 2020s, there were efforts by anarchists in Canada to resist gentrification in cities. In 2022, an anarchist cafe called "The Anarchist" was opened in Toronto where coffee was sold on a "pay what you can" basis. It was also a source of radical books, prints, zines, and merchandise within the city. After 14 months of operations, the cafe closed as a result of poor sales over the winter in May 2023. The experiment gained widespread negative attention from traditional media outlets such as the Toronto Star, National Post, Fortune magazine, and New York Post, who heavily criticized it for its impracticality and radical politics. It also gained widespread attention on social media.

Anarchists in Canada were also involved in the Gaza war protests on university campuses. The West Downtown Anarchist Group in Montreal hosted un-authorized anti-war discussions at Concordia University in 2024 and participated in student-led demonstrations against the Gaza war throughout the city.

== Book fairs ==
Canada is home to a number of anarchist book fairs and other festivals. In 2015, the Victoria Anarchist Book Fair celebrated its 10th anniversary. Edmonton held an anarchist book fair from 2002 through 2013, inclusive. Similar fairs are held in Montréal, Toronto, Winnipeg, and other locations throughout Canada. Some anarchist book fairs have led to conflicts with law enforcement. An anarchist book fair in Hamilton, Ontario in 2018 led to investigations by police as result a spree of anti-gentrification vandalism incidents related to the book fair.

== Organisations ==
=== Extant ===
- Sons of Freedom (1902-)
- Industrial Workers of the World (1905-)
- Spartacus Books (1973-)
- Montréal Antifasciste (1980-)
- A-Zone (1995-)
- Camas Bookstore and Infoshop (2007-)
- Naissance de l'Union communiste libertaire (2007-)
- Punch Up Collective (2014-)
- The West Downtown Anarchist Group (2023-)

=== Historical ===
- One Big Union (1919–1956)
- Free Society Group (1930s Toronto)
- Toronto Libertarian Group (1930s Toronto)
- Rochdale College (1968–1975)
- Exile Infoshop (2007–2010) "Exile Infoshop". Archived from the original on 2023-03-29.
- Prairie Struggle Organization (2011–2014)

== Gallery ==
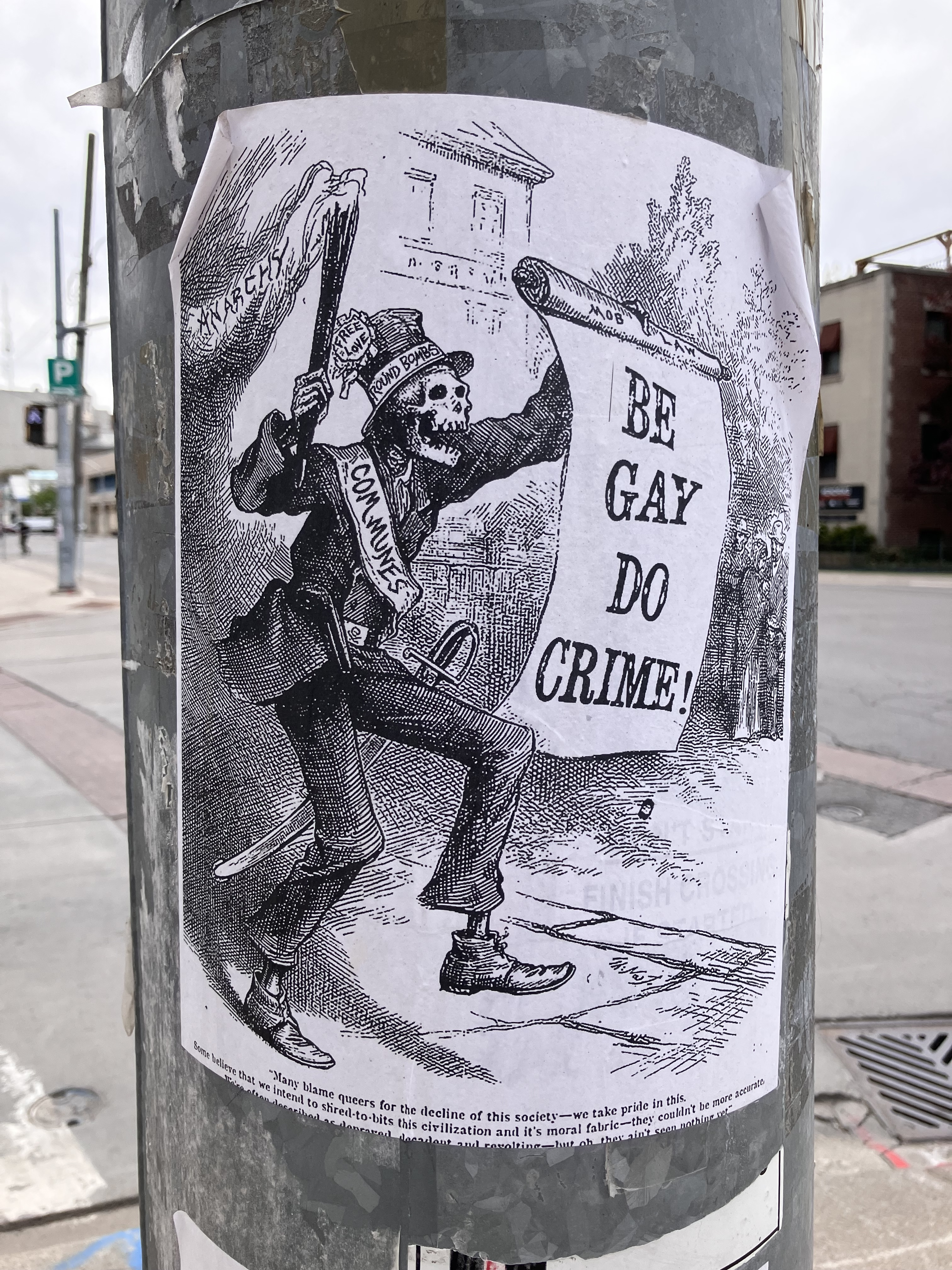
An anarchist poster in St. Catharines imploring residents to "be gay, do crime"

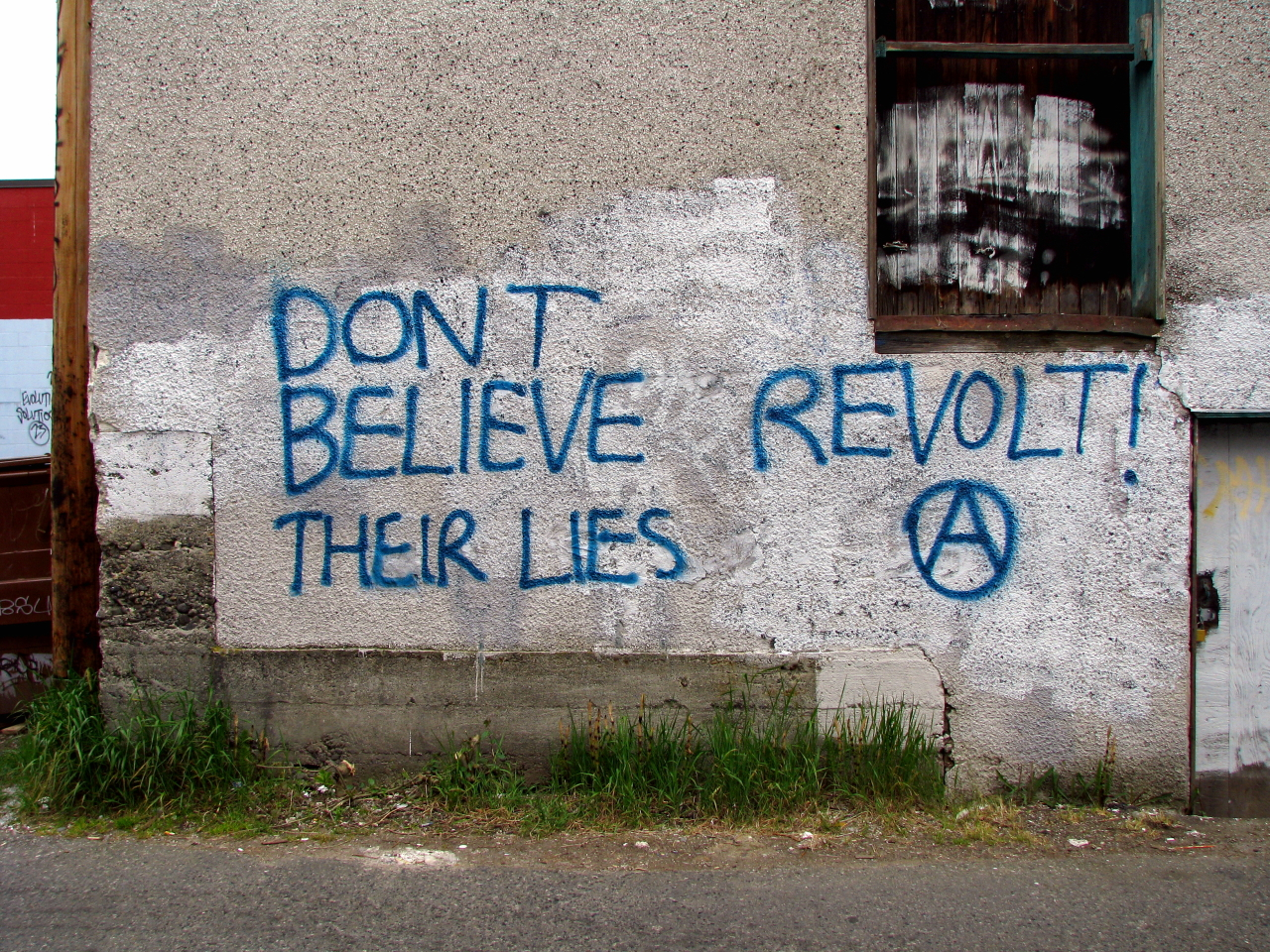
Anarchist graffiti in Vancouver

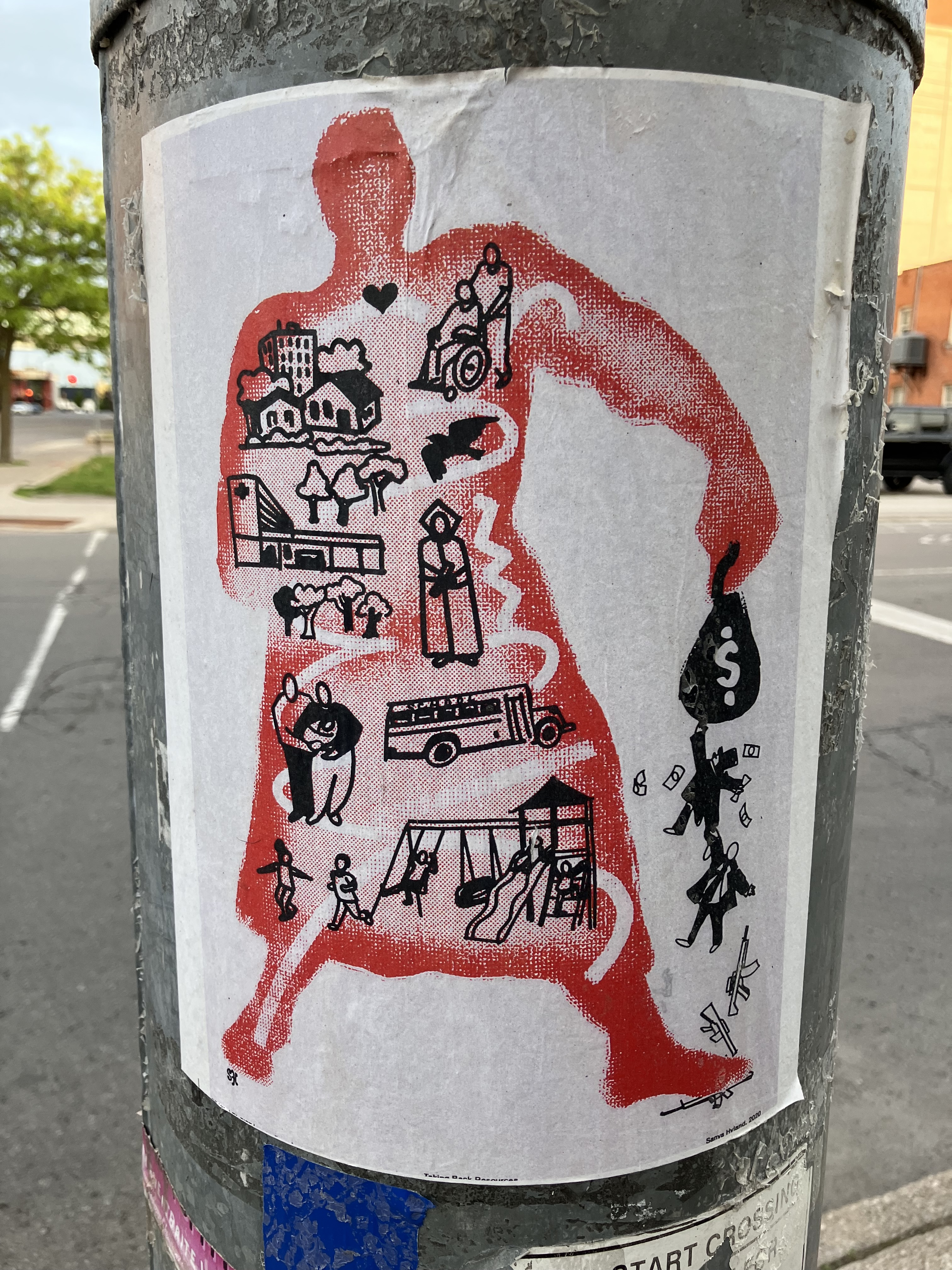
Poster in St. Catharines protesting capitalism and wealth inequality

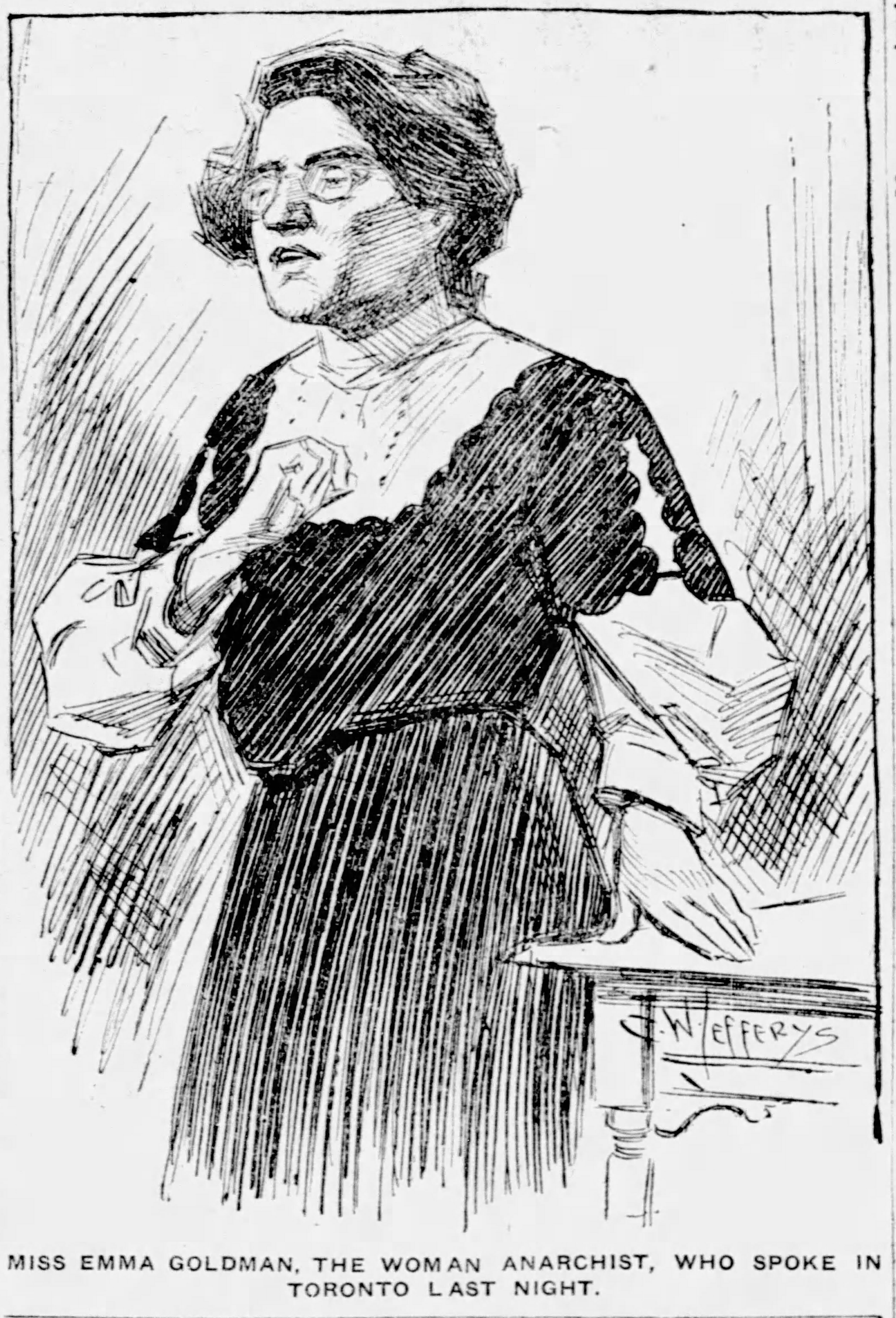
A drawing from the Toronto Star depicting Emma Goldman

== See also ==
- Category:Canadian anarchists
- List of anarchist movements by region
- Camas Bookstore and Infoshop
- Freedomites
- G7 Welcoming Committee
- List of anarchist organizations
- Mondragon Bookstore
- Ontario Coalition Against Poverty
- Political culture of Canada
- Socialism in Canada
- Squamish Five

== Bibliography ==
- Antliff, Alan (2009). "Anarchism, Canada". In Ness, Immanuel (ed.). The International Encyclopedia of Revolution and Protest. pp. 110–111. doi:10.1002/9781405198073.wbierp0046.
