= Camas Bookstore and Infoshop =

Anarchist bookshop in Victoria, Canada

Coordinates: 48°26′14.91″N 123°21′31.7″W

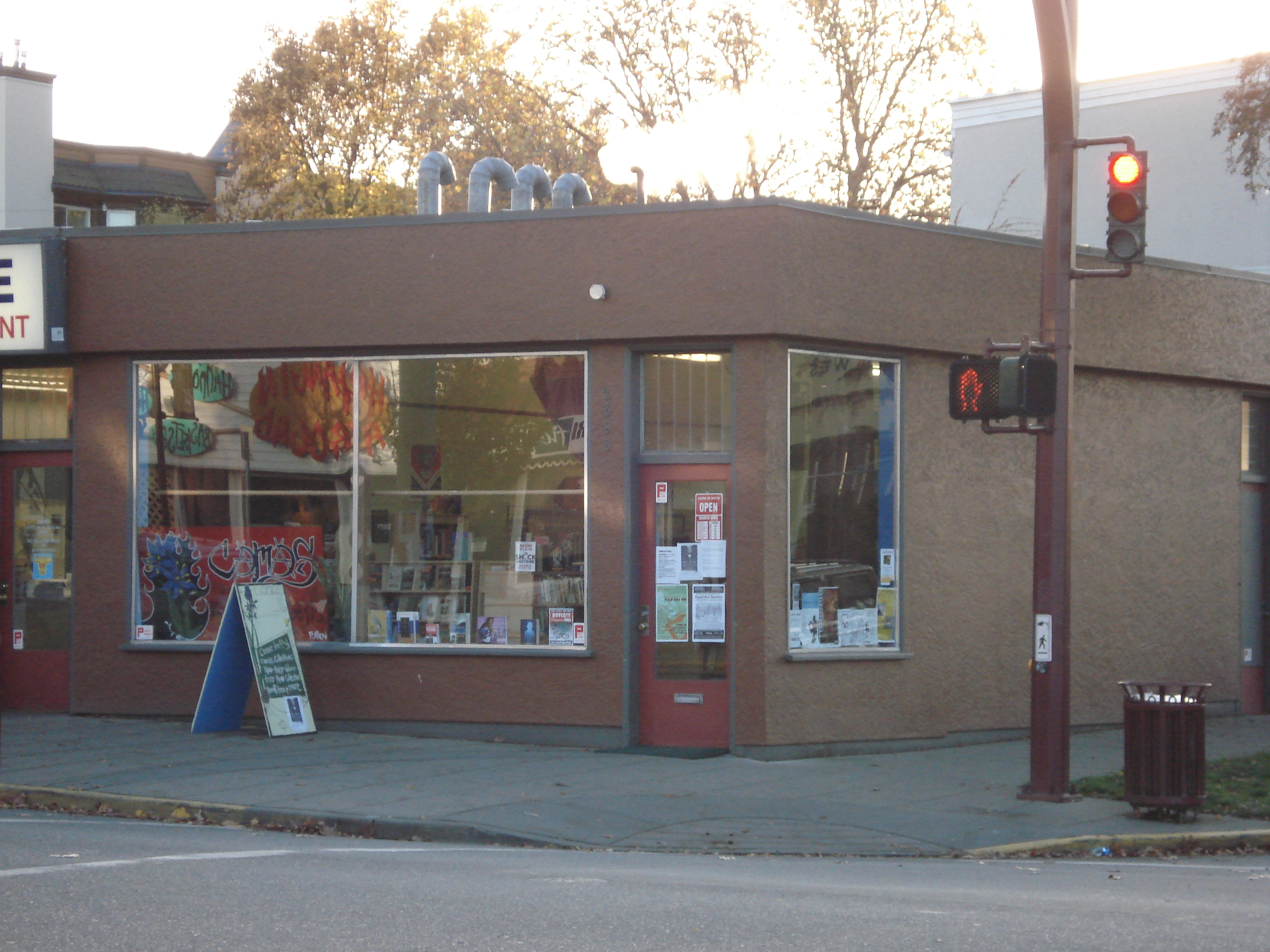
- Camas Collective Books and Infoshop in its former home
- Company type: Bookstore and infoshop
- Predecessor: Dark Horse Books
- Founded: September 2007; 18 years ago in Victoria, British Columbia, unceded Lkwungen territory
- Founder: Allan Antliff
- Area served: British Columbia
- Products: Books
- Owner: Camas Collective
- Website: camas.ca

The Camas Bookstore and Infoshop is a not-for-profit infoshop located at 2620 Quadra Street in Victoria, British Columbia, Canada.

== History ==
A collective which included Allan Antliff started off renting shelf space at Dark Horse Books in Victoria. Camas was then established at 2590 Quadra Street on the corner of Kings Road, in September 2007.

The infoshop is named after the camas plant (camassia quamash), which was grown by the local Lekwungen nation. The project aimed to publicise social justice perspectives and to make solidarity links to social movements worldwide. The space was intended to be as accessible as possible. Camas sells books and zines on the themes of anarchism, anti-capitalism and anti-colonialism. It is non-profit and supporting itself through book sales and events, such as exhibitions, readings and films. Camas was raided by the Victoria Police Department in 2010. Four volunteers were detained whilst the police searched, taking away two computers. The police were searching for evidence concerning vandalism of the mayor's house.

In October 2012 Camas Books moved to a new location at 2620 Quadra, less than half a block away from the original location. The store hosted a book launch for Ann Hansen's Taking the Rap: Women Doing Time for Society's Crimes in 2018.

== See also ==
- Spartacus Books
- The Old Market Autonomous Zone
