= Direct action (disambiguation) =

Direct action is militant political action outside the usual political channels.

Direct action may also refer to:

== Books ==
- Direct Action: An Ethnography, a 2009 book by David Graeber
- Direct Action: Memoirs of an Urban Guerrilla, a book about anarchism by Ann Hansen

== Organizations ==
- Action Directe (English: Direct Action), a French leftist terrorist group
- Direct Action (trade union), an independent Ukrainian students union
- Direct Action UK, a far-right group operating on Telegram channel
- Direct Action, also known as the Squamish Five, a Canadian anarchist organization
- Priama akcia (English: Direct Action), a Slovak member union of the International Workers' Association

== Periodicals ==
- Direct Action (magazine), an anarchist magazine published by the Solidarity Federation
- Direct Action (newspaper), an Australian newspaper published in Sydney, New South Wales

== Other uses ==
- Act of War: Direct Action, a 2005 real-time strategy game
- Action Directe (climb), a rock climb in Frankenjura, Germany
- Direct Action (2024) a French documentary film
- Direct action (military), a military operation involving special operations forces
- Direct Action: Day 21, a 2001 album by punk rock band Sham 69
- Direct Action Day (16 August 1946), a day of rioting and killing in Calcutta also known as the Great Calcutta Killings
- Direct-action lawsuit (legal)
