= Determinations (film) =

1987 documentary film by Oliver Hockenhull

- Directed by: Oliver Hockenhull
- Music by: Dennis Burke
- Release date: 1987
- Running time: 70 minutes
- Country: Canada
- Language: English

Determinations is a Canadian experimental documentary film, directed by Oliver Hockenhull and released in 1987.

Examining the media coverage of the Squamish Five, a direct-action group who were convicted and jailed in the Litton Industries bombing, the film is a personal essay about contemporary culture's ambivalent relationship with violence and its embrace of the military-industrial complex.

== Production ==
The film blends news footage with sequences of animation, shadow dance and spoken-word poetry performance, and scripted dramatic vignettes, blending both traditional and avant-garde filmmaking techniques. It features a punk rock soundtrack with music by artists such as D.O.A., Subhumans, Carmen Reittich, Scott McLeod, Pat Chird and Gerry Hannah, and poetry performances by Judy Radul.

Hockenhull noted that his intention was not to glorify or excuse the actions of the Squamish Five, but to illuminate the larger cultural blind spots that exist around violence and war. He also told the Vancouver Sun that "I hate the term experimental film. It's just a ghettoization of works that don't fit the mould. But the mould needs to be broken. We've grown used to it and grown tired of it, and it doesn't really help us to understand the world."

== Legacy ==
The film was included in a 2002 retrospective of Hockenhull's work at Vancouver's Blinding Light Cinema.

In 2023, Telefilm Canada announced that the film was one of 23 titles that will be digitally restored under its new Canadian Cinema Reignited program to preserve classic Canadian films.
