= Arbeiter Ring Publishing =

Canadian independent book publisher

Arbeiter Ring Publishing, now known as ARP Books, is a worker-owned and operated independent book publisher and distributor that specializes in progressive, radical and anarchist literature (both fiction and non-fiction). Founded by Todd Scarth and John K. Samson in Winnipeg in 1996, the publishing company was originally based in The Old Market Autonomous Zone (or A-Zone), which also housed Mondragon Bookstore and Coffee House, and other radical and worker-run organizations. Named after Arbeiter Ring (meaning "Workers' Circle"), a radical Jewish workers' organization (which had a strong presence in Winnipeg at the outset of the 20th century and helped promote Emma Goldman's early visits to the city), Arbeiter Ring also shares a commitment to workers' self-management. One aspect of this is the organization's promotion of participatory economics (or parecon), an alternative economic model first articulated by Michael Albert and Robin Hahnel.

== Notable books ==
- Ward Churchill, Struggle for the Land (1999 edition)
- Ward Churchill, Pacifism as Pathology: Notes on an American Pseudopraxis (1998)
- Caelum Vatnsdal, They Came From Within: A History of Canadian Horror Cinema (2004)
