= Transnational Radicals =

2015 book

- First edition
- Author: Travis Tomchuk
- Subject: Anarchism, ethnic studies, history, immigration
- Publisher: University of Manitoba Press
- Publication date: March 2015
- Pages: 280
- ISBN: 978-0-88755-773-6

Transnational Radicals: Italian Anarchists in Canada and the U.S., 1915–1940, is a book by historian Travis Tomchuk on early 20th century Italian anarchists in Canada and the United States.

== Bibliography ==
- Di Paola, Pietro (May 30, 2018). "Anarchism and Transnational Networks in North and South America". Labour / Le Travail. 81: 245–264. doi:10.1353/llt.2018.0009. ISSN 1911-4842. S2CID 150362445. Project MUSE 695419.
- Dupuis-Déri, Francis (2017). "Transnational Radicals: Italian Anarchists in Canada and the U.S., 1915–1940 by Travis Tomchuk (review)". Histoire sociale/Social history (in French). 50 (101): 227–230. doi:10.1353/his.2017.0032. ISSN 1918-6576. S2CID 148745523. Project MUSE 663801.
- Feu, Montse (2017). "Transnational Radicals: Italian Anarchists in Canada and the U.S. 1915-1940/Immigrants against the State: Yiddish and Italian Anarchism in America". Italian American Review. 7 (1): 77–81. doi:10.5406/italamerrevi.7.1.0077. ISSN 0535-9120. S2CID 246623762. EBSCOhost 123238293.
- Lee, Andrew H. (April 2016). "Rev. of Anarchist Immigrants in Spain and Argentina; Transnational Radicals. Italian Anarchists in Canada and the U.S. 1915–1940; Immigrants against the State. Yiddish and Italian Anarchism in America". International Review of Social History. 61 (1): 165–168. doi:10.1017/S0020859016000146. ISSN 0020-8590.
- Perin, Roberto (March 2016). "Transnational Radicals: Italian Anarchists in Canada and the U.S., 1915–1940 by Travis Tomchuk (review)". Canadian Historical Review. 97 (1): 125–127. doi:10.3138/chr.97.1.BR06. ISSN 0008-3755. Project MUSE 612823.
- Polec, Patryk (January 2016). "Transnational Radicals: Italian Anarchists in Canada and the U.S., 1915–1940 by Travis Tomchuk (review)". Canadian Journal of History. 51 (2): 438–440. doi:10.3138/cjh.ach.51.2.rev44. ISSN 0008-4107. S2CID 151316910. Project MUSE 627520.
