= Gerald Hannahs =

Gerald Hannahs may refer to:

- Dusty Hannahs, American basketball player and son of Gerry (born 1993)
- Gerry Hannahs, American baseball pitcher and father of Dusty (born 1952)

== See also ==
- Gerald Hannah, Canadian guitarist
