= Direct Action: Memoirs of an Urban Guerrilla =

2001 book by Ann Hansen

- Author: Ann Hansen
- Subject: Direct Action
- Genre: Memoir
- Publisher: AK Press (US), Between the Lines Books (Canada)
- Publication date: 2001
- Pages: 493
- ISBN: 978-1-896357-40-9
- OCLC: 47365290

Direct Action: Memoirs of an Urban Guerrilla is a memoir by the Canadian anarchist Ann Hansen. It was published in 2001 simultaneously by the anarchist book publisher AK Press in the United States and Between the Lines Books in Canada. An audio CD was released by the left-wing Canadian record label G7 Welcoming Committee Records on October 14, 2003 under the name Direct Action: Reflections on Armed Resistance and the Squamish Five.

== Background ==
Ann Hansen was incarcerated for eight years for the bombing of the Litton Industries which was described by its perpetrators as the direct action, urban guerrilla protest. The group was known as Squamish Five, after the name of the BC town where they were arrested, or also as Vancouver Five. In her book, Hansen concedes tactical mistakes, but maintains the necessity of militant opposition to capitalist state. She stated among other things, that

"The essence of direct action ... is people fighting for themselves, rejecting those who claim to represent their true interests, whether they be revolutionaries or government officials. It is a far more subversive idea than civil disobedience because it is not meant to reform or influence state power but is meant to undermine it by showing it to be unnecessary and harmful. When people, themselves, resort to violence to protect their community from racist attacks or to protect their environment from ecological destruction, they are taking direct action".

The book sheds light on mostly forgotten page of the Canadian history, when "the most significant left-wing terrorism took place in the early 1980s, committed by a group of five people from BC who called themselves “Direct Action” after the French revolutionary group, “Action directe”. The ideology of Ann Hansen and her collaborators is characterized as a "mix of environmental, anti-nuclear, and feminist ideals".

== Reception ==
Writing in the Canadian Committee on Labour History's journal Labour / Le Travail, Jim Conley stated the book "is bound to be of interest to students of social movements and the left". In BC Studies, Scott Beadle commented that the book is "very readable and perhaps surprisingly enjoyable".
