= Direct action =

Form of activism in which power is used

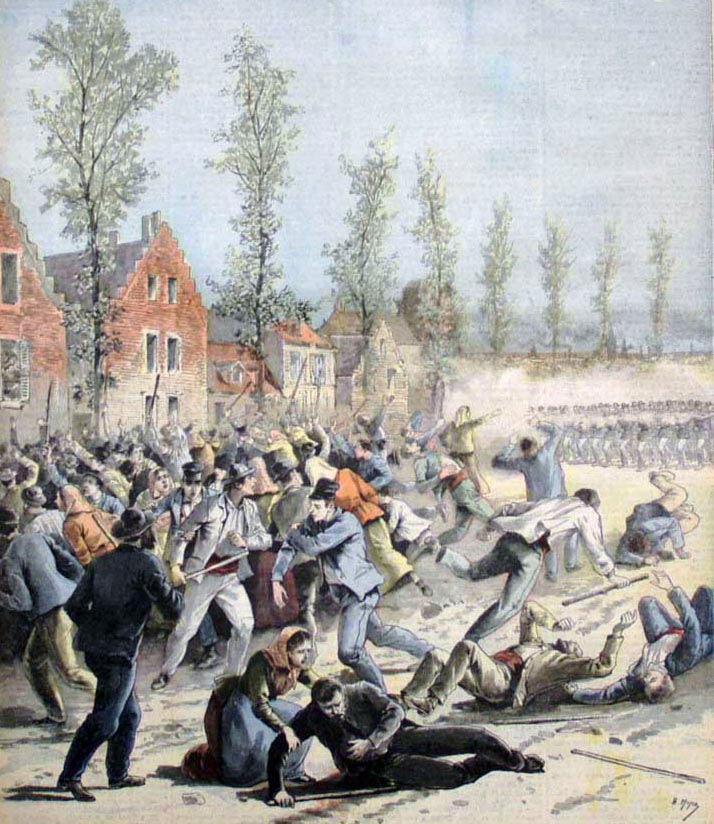
Depiction of the Belgian general strike of 1893. A general strike is an example of direct action.

Direct action is a form of activism in which participants use economic power or political power to achieve their goals. Direct action aims to either obstruct a certain practice such as a government's laws or actions or to draw attention to and create a dialogue in order to solve perceived problems.

Direct action may include activities that can be either violent or nonviolent, targeting people, groups, institutions, actions, or property that its participants deem objectionable.

== Terminology and definitions ==
It is not known when the term direct action first appeared. Spanish philosopher José Ortega y Gasset wrote that the term and concept of direct action originated in fin de siècle France. The Industrial Workers of the World union first mentioned the term "direct action" in a publication about the 1910 Chicago strike. American anarchist Voltairine de Cleyre wrote the essay "Direct Action" in 1912, offering historical examples such as the Boston Tea Party and the American anti-slavery movement, and writing that "direct action has always been used, and has the historical sanction of the very people now reprobating it".

In his 1920 book Direct Action, William Mellor categorized direct action with the struggle between worker and employer for economic control. Mellor defined it "as the use of some form of economic power for securing of ends desired by those who possess that power". He considered it a tool of both owners and workers, and for this reason he included lockouts and cartels, as well as strikes and sabotage.

Canadian anarchist Ann Hansen, one of the Squamish Five, wrote in her book Direct Action that "the essence of direct action [...] is people fighting for themselves, rejecting those who claim to represent their true interests, whether they be revolutionaries or government officials".

In their Direct Action Manual, the environmental organization Earth First! define "direct action" as "solving problems yourself rather than petitioning the authorities or relying on external institutions".

Activist trainer and author Daniel Hunter states, "Nonviolent direct action are techniques outside of institutionalized behavior for waging conflict using methods of protest, noncooperation, and intervention without the use or threat of injurious force."

== History ==
Anti-globalization activists forced the Seattle WTO Ministerial Conference of 1999 to end early via direct action tactics and prefigurative politics.

Human rights activists have used direct action in the campaign to close the School of the Americas (SOA). 245 SOA Watch protestors have collectively spent almost 100 years in prison, and more than 50 people have served probation sentences.

In the United States, direct action is increasingly used to oppose the fossil fuel industry, oil drilling, pipelines, and gas power plant projects.

Direct action was taken at arms factories in the United States and the United Kingdom that supplied arms to Israel during the Gaza war.

== Practitioners ==
Anarchists organize almost exclusively through direct action, which they use due to a rejection of party politics and a refusal to work within hierarchical bureaucratic institutions.

== Tactics ==
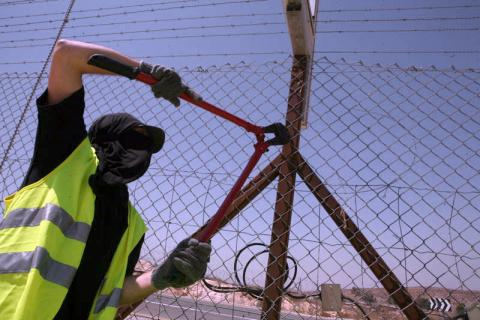
Anarchists Against the Wall destroying fences at the Gaza–Israel barrier in 2007

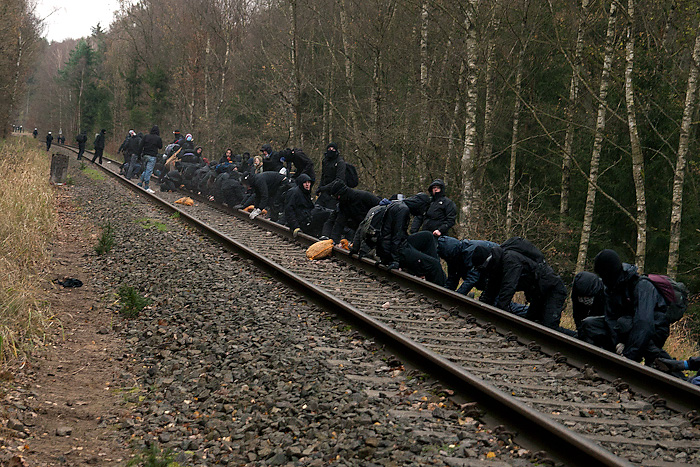
Removing ballast from a train track to protest transport of nuclear waste by rail

Direct action protestors may perform activities such as:

- body block
- linking arms
- lock-ons
- tunneling
- tree sitting
- occupation
- sit-ins
- strikes
- workplace occupation
- street blockades
- hacktivism
- counter-economics
- tax resistance

Some protestors dress in black bloc, wearing black clothing and face coverings to obscure their identities. Ende Gelände protestors wear matching white suits.

Direct action protestors may also destroy property through actions such as vandalism, theft, breaking and entering, sabotage, tree spiking, arson, bombing, ecotage, or eco-terrorism.

Pranks may also be considered a form of direct action. Examples of direct action pranks include the use of stink, critter, and paint bombs. Protestors may pie their targets. The Yes Men practice nonviolent direct action through pranks.

Some direct action groups form legal teams, addressing interactions with law enforcement, judges, and courts.

=== Violent and nonviolent direct action ===
==== Definitions ====
Definitions of what constitutes violent or nonviolent direct action vary. Sociologist Dieter Rucht states that determining if an act is violent falls along a spectrum or gradient—lesser property damage is not violence, injuries to humans are violent, and acts in between could be labelled either way depending on the circumstances. Rucht states that definitions of "violence" vary widely, and cultural perspectives can also color such labels.

American political scientist Gene Sharp defined nonviolent direct action as "those methods of protest, resistance, and intervention without physical violence in which the members of the nonviolent group do, or refuse to do, certain things". American anarchist Voltairine de Cleyre wrote that violent direct action utilizes physical, injurious force against people or, occasionally, property.

Some activist groups, such as Earth Liberation Front and Animal Liberation Front, use property destruction, arson, and sabotage and claim their acts are nonviolent as they believe that violence is harm directed toward living things.

==== Nonviolent direct action ====
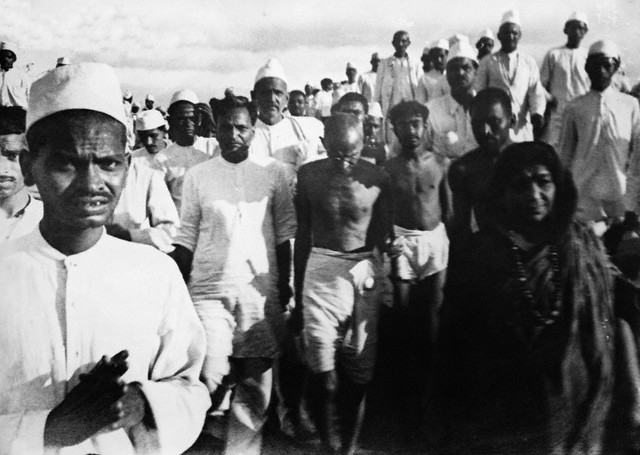
Gandhi, Salt March 1930

American civil rights leader Martin Luther King Jr., who used direct action tactics such as boycotts, felt that the goal of nonviolent direct action was to "create such a crisis and foster such a tension" as to demand a response.

Mahatma Gandhi's methods, which he called satyagraha, did not involve confrontation and could be described as "removal of support" without breaking laws besides those explicitly targeted. Examples of targeted laws include the salt tax and the Asiatic Registration Act. His preferred actions were largely symbolic and peaceful, and included "withdrawing membership, participation or attendance in government-operated [...] agencies". Gandhi and American civil rights leader James Bevel were strongly influenced by Leo Tolstoy's 1894 book The Kingdom of God Is Within You, which promotes passive resistance.

Other terms for nonviolent direct action include civil resistance, people power, and positive action.

==== Violent direct action ====
Insurrectionary anarchism, a militant variant of anarchist ideology, primarily deals with direct action against governments. Insurrectionist anarchists see countries as inherently controlled by the upper classes, and thereby impossible to reform. While the vast majority of anarchists are not militant and do not engage in militant actions, insurrectionists take violent action against the state and other targets. Most insurrectionary anarchists largely reject mass grassroots organizations created by other anarchists, instead calling for coordinated militant action to be taken by decentralized cell networks.

Fascism emphasizes direct action, including the legitimization of political violence, as a core part of its politics.

== Effectiveness ==
While radical activism has been effective as part of the civil rights movement, forceful or violent environmental sabotage (FVES) can have a "negative impact on voter attitudes toward all environmental organizations", though that effect is contingent on the organizations' prior record.

In polls conducted in the United Kingdom, two-thirds of respondents supported non-violent environmental direct action, while a similar percentage believed defacing art or public monuments should be criminalized.

The question of engaging in radical protest is known as the "activist's dilemma": "activists must choose between moderate actions that are largely ignored and more extreme actions that succeed in gaining attention, but may be counterproductive to their aims as they tend to make people think less of the protesters".

== See also ==
- List of civil rights leaders
- List of peace activists
- Praxis (process) – Process by which a theory, lesson, or skill is enacted, embodied, or realized
- Rebellion – Violent resistance against government
- Revolution – Rapid and fundamental political change
- Vigilantism – Act of preventing and punishing crimes without legal authority

== Bibliography ==
- Barry, Andrew (1999). "Demonstrations: sites and sights of direct action". Economy and Society. 28 (1): 75–94. doi:10.1080/03085149900000025.
- Carter, April (2005). Direct Action and Democracy Today. Polity. ISBN 0-7456-2936-9.
- Dupuis-Déri, Francis (2019). "From the Zapatistas to Seattle: The 'New Anarchists'". In Adams, Matthew S.; Levy, Carl (eds.). The Palgrave Handbook of Anarchism. London: Palgrave Macmillan. pp. 471–488. doi:10.1007/978-3-319-75620-2_27. ISBN 978-3-319-75619-6. S2CID 158569370.
- Franks, Benjamin (2003). "The Direct Action Ethic". Anarchist Studies. 11 (1): 13–41. ISSN 0967-3393. Archived from the original on 2023-01-24.
- Graeber, David (2009). Direct Action: An Ethnography. AK Press. ISBN 978-1-904859-79-6. LCCN 2007939198.
- Graham, Robert (2019). "Anarchism and the First International". In Adams, Matthew S.; Levy, Carl (eds.). The Palgrave Handbook of Anarchism. London: Palgrave Macmillan. pp. 325–342. doi:10.1007/978-3-319-75620-2_19. ISBN 978-3-319-75619-6. S2CID 158605651.
- Grant, Wyn (2001). "Pressure Politics: From 'Insider' Politics to Direct Action?". Parliamentary Affairs. 54 (2): 337–348. doi:10.1093/parlij/54.2.337.
- Jordan, Tim (2002). Activism!: Direct Action, Hacktivism and the Future of Society. Reaktion Books. ISBN 1-86189-122-9.
- Mattern, Mark (2019). "Anarchism and Art". In Adams, Matthew S.; Levy, Carl (eds.). The Palgrave Handbook of Anarchism. London: Palgrave Macmillan. pp. 589–602. doi:10.1007/978-3-319-75620-2_33. ISBN 978-3-319-75619-6. S2CID 150145676.
- Ordóñez, Vicente (2018). "Direct Action". In Franks, Benjamin; Jun, Nathan; Williams, Leonard (eds.). Anarchism: A Conceptual Approach. pp. 74–85. doi:10.4324/9781315683652. ISBN 9781315683652.
- Sitrin, Marina (2019). "Anarchism and the Newest Social Movements". In Adams, Matthew S.; Levy, Carl (eds.). The Palgrave Handbook of Anarchism. London: Palgrave Macmillan. pp. 659–676. doi:10.1007/978-3-319-75620-2_37. ISBN 978-3-319-75619-6. S2CID 158345658.
- Tracy, James (1996). Direct Action: Radical Pacifism from the Union Eight to the Chicago Seven. University of Chicago Press. ISBN 0-226-81130-1. LCCN 96-12278. Archived from the original on 2023-01-24.
- Williams, Dana M. (2019). "Tactics: Conceptions of Social Change, Revolution, and Anarchist Organisation". In Adams, Matthew S.; Levy, Carl (eds.). The Palgrave Handbook of Anarchism. London: Palgrave Macmillan. pp. 107–124. doi:10.1007/978-3-319-75620-2_6. ISBN 978-3-319-75619-6. S2CID 150249195.
- Wood, Lesley J. (2012). Direct Action, Deliberation, and Diffusion: Collective Action after the WTO Protests in Seattle. Cambridge University Press. ISBN 978-1-107-02071-9. LCCN 2012003301. Archived from the original on 2023-01-24.
- Zimmer, Kenyon (2019). "Haymarket and the Rise of Syndicalism". In Adams, Matthew S.; Levy, Carl (eds.). The Palgrave Handbook of Anarchism. London: Palgrave Macmillan. pp. 353–370. doi:10.1007/978-3-319-75620-2_21. ISBN 978-3-319-75619-6. S2CID 158225785.
