= Allan Antliff =

American anarchist activist

Allan W. Antliff
- Born: 1957 (age 68–69)
- Occupations: Art Historian, Art Critic, Author
- Known for: Activism, founding member of the Toronto Anarchist Free School

Allan W. Antliff (born 1957) is a Canadian anarchist activist, art critic, author and founding member of the Toronto Anarchist Free School (now Anarchist U) who has written extensively on the topics of anarchism and art in North America since the 1980s.

== Career ==
From 2003 to 2013, Antliff held the Canada Research Chair in Art History at the University of Victoria, where he teaches undergraduate and graduate courses on modern and contemporary art. Since 2023, he has held the Jeffery Rubinoff Legacy Chair in the Faculty of Fine Arts. His research interests interfaces between art and political theory. He has written on art and anarchism, post-structuralism, pedagogy, dada, new media, theatre, protest movements and aesthetics. Previous graduate seminars include "20th-Century Anarchism and Avant-Garde Art"; "New York Dada," "Russian Constructivism," and "American Modernism Between the Wars."

In addition to teaching art history, Antliff is also involved in editorial work. From 2003-2006 he co-edited the Alternative Press Review, and beginning in 2002, served as art editor for Anarchist Studies, a position he continues to hold to this day. In 2021 he assumed the role of editor in chief of Anarchist Developments in Cultural Studies (ADCS).

Antliff's own publications include the edited volume, Only a Beginning: An Anarchist Anthology (1998) and he has written three scholarly books; Anarchist Modernism: Art, Politics and the First American Avant-Garde (2001), Art and Anarchy: From the Paris Commune to the Fall of the Berlin Wall (2007), and Joseph Beuys (2014).

In 2005, Allan Antliff founded the Anarchist Archive at the University of Victoria, where he serves as director.

== Selected publications ==
- Only a Beginning: An Anarchist Anthology. Arsenal Pulp Press (2004) ISBN 1-55152-167-9.
- Anarchist Modernism: Art, Politics, and the First American Avant-Garde. University of Chicago Press (2001).
- Anarchy and Art: From the Paris Commune to the Fall of the Berlin Wall. Arsenal Pulp Press (1998).
- Anarchy in Art: Strategies of Dissidence, Anarchist Studies. 11 no. 1 (2003): 66–83.
- Art/Politics/Subterfuge, Mix Magazine. 27 no. 4 (2002): 29–31.
- "Egoist Cyborgs," The Uncanny: Experiments in Cyborg Culture, ed. Bruce Grenville, exh. cat. Vancouver Art Gallery (2002): 101–113.
- "Cosmic Modernism: Elie Nadelman, Adolf Wolff, and the Materialist Aesthetics of John Weichsel," Archives of American Art Journal. 38 no. 3 (Winter, 2000): 20–29.
- "Interpellating Modernity: Cubism and 'La Vie Unanime' in America," American Modernism Across the Arts, eds. Jay Bochner and Justin Edwards, Peter Lang Publishers, 1999.
