= Litton Industries bombing =

1982 bombing of an industrial facility

Coordinates: 43.7°N 79.6°W

In October, 1982, three members of an anarchist urban guerrilla group known as Direct Action acted upon "their wish to end the arms race" and filled a stolen pick-up truck with 550 kg (1,210 lb) of dynamite and drove from Vancouver to Toronto, Canada planting the bomb outside a plant owned by the American defence contractor Litton Industries, a manufacturer of American cruise missile components many feared would increase the risk of nuclear war. Although the militants had phoned to evacuate the building, the bomb was accidentally detonated several minutes before its announced deadline, injuring several bomb squad police officers and citizens in the vicinity.

== Litton Industries' role ==
Litton Industries was conceived as a radio-engineering firm in 1934, but was purchased by Charles Bates Thornton, a Pentagon official with "all the right connections in the government and military", in 1956. Litton was transformed into a military producer, building entire naval ships in their own shipyards, and installing their own equipment, including communications and navigation systems.

Described as "the best known economic link between Canada and the nuclear arms race", Litton Industries' Rexdale plant was announced in October 1978 as one of two locations in the world that would be responsible for the manufacture of Terrain Contour Matching (TERCOM) guidance systems of the American Tomahawk cruise missile. The Canadian federal government had given Litton a $26.4 million grant, in addition to a $22.5 million interest-free loan specifically to allow them to bid competitively for the contract, drawing complaints from some members of the public for using federal funds to further the arms race. The American contract called for Litton Canada to produce the navigation systems for approximately 407 cruise missiles.

== Planning ==
I believe that this moral obligation far overrides our obligation to obey man-made laws. ...I felt that it was necessary to begin the development of a resistance movement that could carry out sabotage and expropriations...

— Hansen, in her closing words at trial

On the night of July 27, 1982, a British Columbia Department of Highways explosives storehouse north of Squamish was entered, and 38½ cases of dynamite were stolen. On September 13, a local hunter came upon two camouflaged and locked wooden structures that had been built in the forests of Garibaldi, near the site of the theft. One contained four reels of detonating cord and three boxes of electronic blasting caps, and the other building held 28½ cases of dynamite as well as explosive gelatin. This indicates that ten crates of dynamite were not stored in the wooden structures, to which Direct Action members Brent Taylor and Ann Hansen held keys.

The three associates stole a GMC van in the Greater Toronto Area on September 30, as well as an Oldsmobile and Chevrolet Chevelle three and four nights later respectively.

On the morning of October 14, just hours before the bombing, the Ontario Court of Appeals ruled that five Litton executives from the plant could not be called to testify by the defence counsel of 22 anti-nuclear activists who had been arrested for trespassing one year earlier.

== Execution of the bombing ==
The bombing was carried out on October 14, 1982, using a van that was parked in a location partially concealed by shrubs, with a fluorescent "warning box" duct taped to the hood, displaying a message, a digital clock counting down, and a single stick of dynamite.

DANGER EXPLOSIVES – Inside this van are 550 lbs. of commercial dynamite which will explode anytime from within 15 minutes to 25 minutes after the van was parked here. The dynamite will be set off by two completely separate detonating systems. Do not enter or move the van – it will explode. Phone the police immediately and have them block off Highway 27, Cityview Drive, Dixon Road and other roads surrounding the Litton plants and have the workers inside the plants moved to protected areas. Nearby hotels and factories should also be notified so that no one will be hurt by the blast. On top of this box is an authentic sample stick of the dynamite contained inside the van. This is to confirm that this is a real bomb.

— The message atop the box

Direct Action member Juliet Caroline Belmas called the security desk and warned them that a dynamite bomb was placed in a van outside the building, and that it would detonate "in 15 to 20 minutes". She also told the guards to evacuate the plant, phone the local hotels to warn guests to stay away from windows to avoid injury and to have police close down passing roadways so that only the Litton Industries building would be damaged.

... And it will explode in 15 to 20 minutes. Do not enter or move the van because it will explode. This is no prank. We have left for you on the lawn beside the van a box, which is not dangerous. Taped to the box are further instructions and a stick of the same dynamite that we have used in the bomb. This should be ample evidence in confirming to you the severity of our attack.

Act immediately to phone the police and have them block off traffic from Cityview drive, Highway 27, Dixon Road and other surrounding areas. Move all the workers from all of your plants to protected areas and notify the surrounding hotels to have people stay away from all windows.

I want to be sure that you understand what I just said. Could you repeat the crucial information to me?

— Belmas's phone call, when the security guard began recording it

The bomb detonated 11 minutes after the phone call. Speculation by local police constable Mitchell of the Toronto bomb squad three weeks after the bombing proposed that if responding officers had used radios, their use may possibly have triggered the detonation early. A representative of Litton also confirmed that radios were used during the evacuation of the plant.

The explosion injured three members of the police, three passing motorists and five Litton employees, blowing out a 50-foot section of wall on the main two-story plant, and damaging two adjacent buildings. The cost of damages was described by police as being "in the millions". Damages were estimated anywhere from $3.87 million to $50 million.

On October 19, a 9-page communiqué was mailed to various organisations and media outlets. The first six pages were titled "Direct Action" and explained the philosophy of the group's actions. The remaining three pages were titled "Statement regarding the October 14 Litton Bombing" and included an explanation of the purpose of the bombing, as well as an apology for the injuries.

== Aftermath ==
In Toronto someone blew up
A cruise missile warhead plant.
10 slightly hurt, 4 million dollars' damage.
Why not destroy private property
When it's used against you and me?
Is that violence?
Or self-defence?
You tell me

— Lyrics from the 1986 Dead Kennedys song "Where do ya draw the line?"

Although Litton Industries indicated that the bombing had not slowed production by more than a week, the bombing was hailed as a "massive success" by the anarchist movement who saw it as "an act of sabotage" against the American military machine. Although there was not wide public support for the bombing, Ann Hansen later pointed to the fact that 15,000 people attended a "Refuse the Cruise" demonstration two weeks after the bombing as evidence it had forced the public to confront Canada's role in the military–industrial complex. Others have concurred that the bombing did galvanize the population, who viewed the bombing as controversial or unnecessary, but took to the streets in greatly strengthened numbers to protest Canada complicity in the production of instruments of war. A month after the bombing, 700 people showed up at the Litton Industries plant to engage in "civil disobedience" despite police warnings.

In a statement following the event, Litton President Ronald Keating said, "Bombing is madness!" Organizers ridiculed this statement as hypocritical, considering Litton's nature as a defense contractor. Following the bombing, Litton increased their security budget by $2 million, money that Keating said "was money which could be put into our business to help make us more competitive".

The day after the bombing, an anonymous male telephoned Garrett Manufacturing, another defense contractor housed several blocks away in the same Toronto neighbourhood, to report that a bomb had been placed in the building; leading to an evacuation of the 15 personnel on-shift.

Two years later on the second anniversary of the action, the Belgian Cellules Communistes Combattantes (English: Communist Combat Cells) bombed Litton buildings situated in Evere, Brussels. A communique by the CCC claimed the attack for similar reasons to Direct Action, describing Litton as 'the designer, manufacturer and producer of the Cruise missile guidance system whose installation preparations are well underway on the site of the Florennes military base". It was the first claimed attack of the CCC's two-year campaign.

16 years later, due to purely financial considerations, Litton Industries lost their government contract to build the navigation systems to Kearfott Guidance & Navigation.

== Investigation ==
Sgt. William Deconkey, of the Toronto Police, was put in charge of the investigation; and was said to have accepted offers from the U.S. Federal Bureau of Investigation and Central Intelligence Agency to help "hunt the terrorists".

In the days following the bombing, the Royal Canadian Mounted Police obtained approval for a 90-day Level IV operation against the Cruise Missile Conversion Project (CMPC), intended to determine the level of influence among known "subversives". The telephones of CMPC members, including Ken Hancock, were wiretapped for "some considerable time" according to Roy McMurtry, the Attorney General of Ontario. Hancock was also the subject of a police raid that seized four bags of documents, after his name surfaced in the diary of Ivan LeCouvie, another man who was arrested and then released by police.

== Trials ==
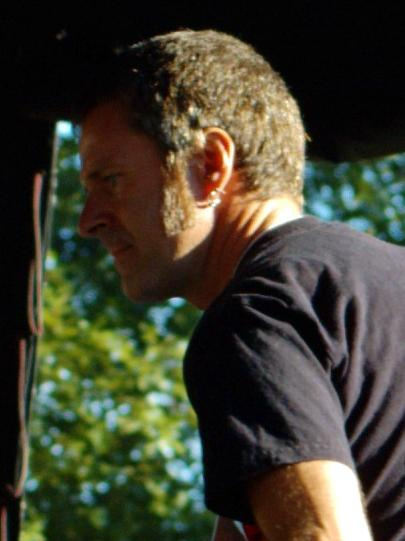
Gerry Hannah, pictured, later told Maximumrocknroll that he and Belmas pleaded guilty to lessen their sentences since "the evidence was overwhelming, to put it mildly".

Taylor, hailed as the "intellectual leader of the group" due to having written about the philosophy of guerrilla tactics and revolution, was sentenced to 9 years for the Litton bombing, to be served concurrently with the 22-year sentence he received for conspiracy to rob an armoured bank truck. Hansen, pleading guilty, was sentenced to 12 years for the Litton bombing, to be served concurrently with her life sentence for conspiracy to rob the bank truck, her six years for the bombing of the power station and several other mixed sentences for the firebombing of the pornography stores in Vancouver. Gerry Hannah and Doug Stewart, although sentenced to six and ten years respectively for other Direct Action activities, were not convicted of playing any role in the Litton bombing.

Some defenders of the group have suggested that the accused plead guilty to ensure the trial was not about who committed the action, but "to turn the trials into a political showcase, trotting out the evils of nuclear power, pornography and cruise missiles for all to see".

The judge ruled that Hansen's life sentence was merited because "her only remorse or regret is for the injury she caused the ten Litton Systems victims" and that she did not apologise for any of the group's property damage.

In arriving at the sentencing for the group, the judge declared:

I have no doubt that all of these people are well-motivated people working, if not struggling, against unfavourable odds to promote their respective causes... but the message must be crystal clear. Our Canadian way of life will not tolerate the use of fire, explosive substances or weapons as a means to furthering even worthy objectives.

== Popular culture ==
The plot of the 1984 film Unfinished Business involves anarchists plotting to blow up a Toronto factory that produces parts for nuclear weapons.
