= Tim Jordan (sociologist) =

British sociologist and professor

Tim Jordan is an emeritus professor at the University College London in the Department of UCL Arts and Sciences. Prior to that, he worked at the University of Sussex, King's College London in culture, media and creative industries and digital humanities departments, and has previously worked as the head of the sociology department at the Open University and began his career in the Sociology Department at the University of East London. He has published his work on hacking and online cultures. He was co-founder of the journal Social Movement Studies.

== Academic career ==
Jordan was a reader in Sociology at the Open University for eleven years and during his time there he became the head of the department of sociology. He moved to King's College London, in 2011. He was a senior lecturer at King's College and a member of two departments: Culture, media and creative industries and Digital humanities. He has been the head of the department of culture, media and creative industries. He moved to the University of Sussex as Head of the School of Media, Film and Music in 2014. He then moved in 2020 to University College London as Professor of Digital Cultures and Head of the Programme in Arts and Sciences (BASc). He stood down as Head of Department of UCL Arts and Sciences in 2024 and in 2025 he became Emeritus Professor of Arts and Sciences.

== Social Movement Studies journal ==
He was co-founder and former editor in 2002 of the Routledge journal Social Movement Studies: Journal of Social, Cultural and Political Protest.

== Areas of interest ==
Jordan has specific interests in internet cultures and the way internet technologies have affected wider cultures. He has worked on politically motivated hacking and has researched hacking communities. He has also had interest in massive multiplayer online games as a 'player and analyst' and has published work on Pokémon.

== Media ==
Jordan appeared on the BBC's Global programme discussing if computer gaming is 'gaining older gamers'. Jordan took part in an Open University learning video in 2009 in which he discussed computer hacking. Jordan commented on the case of hacker, Gary McKinnon, in his book: Hacking: Digital Media and Technological Determinism and in an interview with Time World. He also criticized the 'absurd' security of the US online defences.

== Selected bibliography by Jordan ==
Jordan's work has been translated into seven languages.

He is the author of several books on the sociology of the Internet and social movements:

- The Digital Economy (2020)
- Information Politics (2015)
- Internet, Culture and Society (2013)
- Hacking: Digital Media and Technological Determinism (2008)
- Hactivism and Cyberwars: Rebels with a Cause (2004)
- Activism!: direct action, hacktivism and the future of society (2002)
- Cyberpower: The Culture and Politics of Cyberspace and the Internet (1999)
- Reinventing revolution: value and difference in new social movements and the Left (1994)
