= Ann Hansen =

Canadian anarchist

- Organization: Direct Action
- Known for: Urban guerrilla
- Notable work: Direct Action: Memoirs of an Urban Guerrilla
- Movement: Anarchism
- Criminal penalty: Life imprisonment
- Criminal status: On parole

Ann Hansen is a Canadian anarchist and former member of Direct Action, a guerrilla organization known for the 1982 bombing of a Litton Industries plant, which made components for American cruise missiles. After her arrest she was sentenced to life in prison and was released on parole after seven years. Hansen wrote of her experiences in her 2002 book, Direct Action: Memoirs of an Urban Guerrilla. She is a prison rights activist and released her book Taking the Rap: Women Doing Time for Society's Crimes in 2018.

== Direct Action ==
By the late 1970s, Hansen was living in Toronto, where she met Brent Taylor. She then moved to Vancouver and began a relationship with Taylor. They decided to form a guerrilla organization named Direct Action, with the addition of Doug Stewart, Julie Belmas and Gerry Hannah, local fixtures of Vancouver's punk scene. The group carried out militant actions which included an attack on a BC Hydro substation on Vancouver Island and the Litton Industries bombing in Toronto. The Litton Industries site was preparing to build components for US cruise missiles and the explosion played a part in Litton losing the contract. Hansen, as a member of a separate group known as the Wimmin’s Fire Brigade, later fire-bombed several Red Hot Video stores in Vancouver which sold hardcore porn.

Hansen and other members of Direct Action were arrested in 1983 and she was remanded to Oakalla Prison in British Columbia. After being sentenced to life imprisonment, she was moved to Kingston Prison for Women and later the Grand Valley Institution for Women in Kitchener. She was struck by the number of prisoners who were indigenous or black. Hansen was released on parole after seven years. Hansen released a memoir entitled Direct Action: Memoirs of an Urban Guerrilla in 2001.

== Activism ==
In August 2012, Hansen was arrested and imprisoned for alleged parole violations after she had organised a film screening at public library in Kingston, Ontario at which a lawyer gave a direct action workshop. She was held again at the Grand Valley Institution for Women. She was released with stricter parole conditions in October.

After writing the book Taking the Rap: Women Doing Time for Society's Crimes about her experiences of incarceration, Hansen made a speaking tour of Canada, talking at the University of British Columbia, Capilano University, Kwantlen Polytechnic University (KPU), the University of Winnipeg and the Magnus Eliason Recreation Centre in Winnipeg, amongst other places.

Hansen is part of the P4W Memorial Collective, which campaigns for the preservation of the former Kingston Prison for Women, where she was previously incarcerated. When the building was redeveloped, the group requested a memorial garden be built to remember those women who were imprisoned there. Hansen participated in 2020 as a speaker in the event Untold stories on Kingston Penitentiary Tours: An online panel discussion.

Hansen donated her personal papers to the University of Victoria Libraries' Special Collections & University Archives' Anarchist Archives in 2011.

== Selected works ==
- Direct Action: Memoirs of an Urban Guerrilla. Toronto: Between the Lines, 2001. (ISBN 978-1902593487).
- (with Julie Belmas) "This Is Not A Love Story: Armed Struggle Against The Institutions Of Patriarchy" in Disorderly Conduct 5, 2002.
- "Armed Struggle, Guerilla Warfare, and the Social Movement Influences on 'Direct Action'" in (eds) Nocella, A. and Best, S. Igniting a revolution: Voices in defense of earth, AK Press. 2006. (ISBN 9781904859567)
- Taking the Rap: Women Doing Time for Society's Crimes. 2018. (ISBN 9781771133555).
- Foreword to Remembering the Armed Struggle: My Time with the Red Army Faction by Margrit Schiller. 2021 (ISBN 9781629638737).

== See also ==
- Eco-anarchism
- Urban guerrilla
