= Mondragon Bookstore & Coffeehouse =

Former bookstore and cafe in Winnipeg, Canada

Coordinates: 49°53′49.78″N 97°8′24.65″W

- Type: Worker cooperative
- Founded: 1996
- Defunct: January 2014
- Headquarters: Winnipeg, Manitoba, Canada

The Mondragon Bookstore & Coffeehouse was a political bookstore and vegan cafe located in The Old Market Autonomous Zone at 91 Albert Street in Winnipeg, Manitoba, Canada. The name comes from the Mondragón Cooperative Corporation and other organisations in the Basque town of Mondragón Spain that is known for its extensive network of worker's cooperatives.

Mondragon was organized as a workers' collective with no hierarchy and all workers receiving the same wage rate. This was based on the economic structure of Parecon, developed by Robin Hahnel and Michael Albert.

The firm closed on January 26, 2014, citing financial difficulties.

== History ==
Mondragon was co-founded by Winnipeg activists Paul Burrows and Sandra Drosdowech, and opened its doors on July 15, 1996, with an initial collective of ten members.

== Structure ==
Mondragon's internal structure, inspired by the participatory economic model, is part of a long tradition of workers' collectives. It aspired to complete non-hierarchy: there were to be no owners or managers other than the workers themselves. One of the co-founders of the workplace presented a paper at the World Social Forum in Brazil on the practical difficulties of applying parecon principles to a workplace in the midst of capitalism. This paper was later published in the anthology Real Utopia: Participatory Society for the 21st Century (AK Press, 2008) under the title "Parecon and Workers' Self-Management: Reflections on Winnipeg's Mondragon Bookstore & Coffee House Collective." Some commentators have also noted that regardless of the egalitarian workplace structure, in the final analysis, retail work is still largely menial and turn-over rates are comparable to more corporate counterparts.

== See also ==
- List of vegetarian and vegan restaurants
