= Gerry Hannah =

Canadian musician and anarchist activist

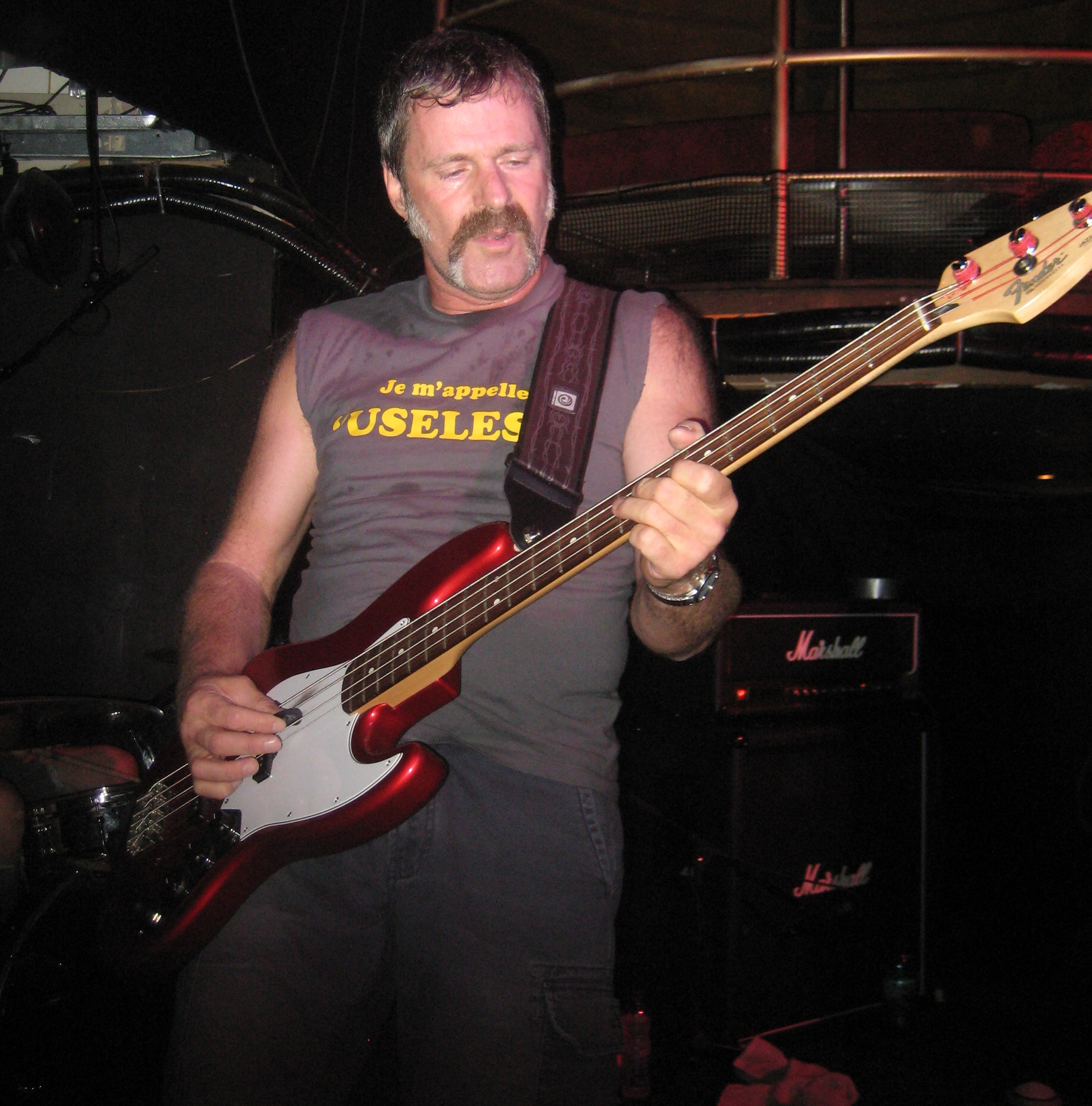
- Gerry Hannah playing in Montreal, September 2010

Background information
- Birth name: Gerald Richard Hannah
- Also known as: Gerry Useless
- Origin: Canada
- Genres: Punk, indie rock, folk rock
- Instrument(s): Bass guitar, voice, rhythm guitar
- Website: gerryhannah.com

Gerald Richard Hannah (also known as Gerry Useless; birthdate unknown) is a Canadian musician who was the bass guitarist for the Canadian punk rock group The Subhumans. Hannah was also a member of the armed revolutionary group known as the Squamish Five.

== Musical career ==
Hannah was a member of the Vancouver-based punk rock band The Subhumans from 1978 to 1981. Also "Useless" was a member of The Stiffs. He reunited with his ex-bandmates for a few shows in 1995 and was part of an extended reunion between 2005 and 2010. The Subhumans were best known for their 1980 album Incorrect Thoughts. The Subhumans also released New Dark Age Parade in 2006 and Death was too Kind in 2008. Same Thoughts, Different Day, a re-recorded version of Incorrect Thoughts, came out in 2010.

In December 2014, Hannah released a solo indie folk-rock record Coming Home. The album is a re-recording of selected tracks from Songs from Underground with some additional material. Most of the songs were written during his time with Direct Action and his imprisonment. Hannah was an interviewee in Bloodied but Unbowed, Susanne Tabata's 2011 documentary about Vancouver's early punk scene.

== Squamish Five ==
Hannah was a member of the Squamish Five (known as the Vancouver Five in the alternative press and Direct Action internally), an anarchist group who carried out a political campaign of "direct actions", including the bombing of missile guidance system manufacturer Litton Industries. In 1983, Hannah was convicted of conspiracy to rob an armoured car and possession of a stolen weapon, for which he received a ten-year prison sentence in Matsqui Prison. He was released on parole in 1988 after serving five years of his sentence.
