= Albert Street Autonomous Zone =

Coordinates: 49°53′51.22″N 97°8′24.98″W

Imperial Dry Goods Block
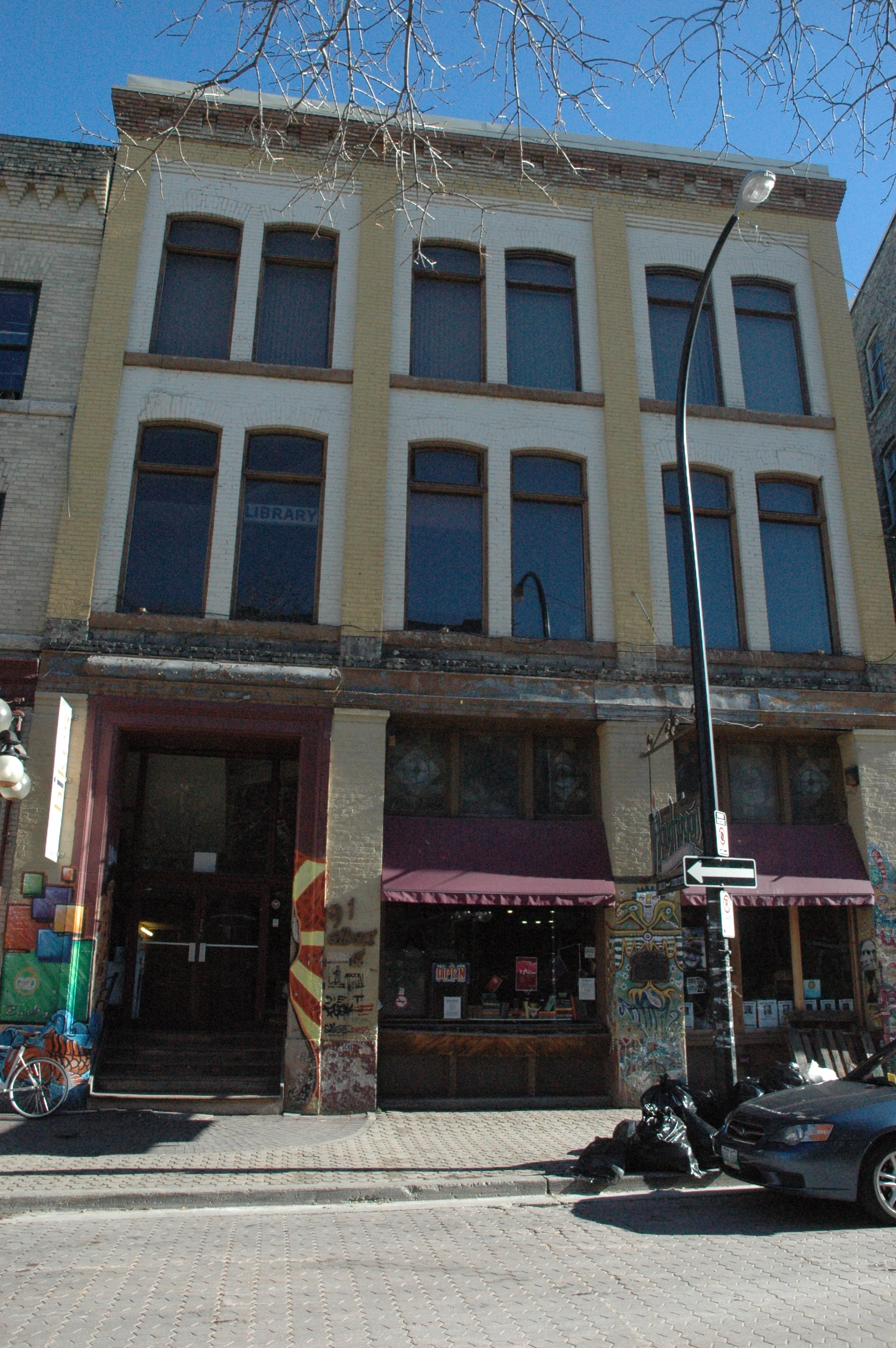
- The Imperial Dry Goods Building, home of Old Market Autonomous Zone
- Alternative names: Trend Interiors Emma Goldman Building Mondragon Bookstore and Cafe Tooke Building

General information
- Location: 91 Albert Street, Winnipeg, Manitoba
- Completed: 1899
- Renovated: 1909

Technical details
- Floor count: 3

Design and construction
- Architect: J.H. Cadham

Heritage site
- Designation: Winnipeg Landmark Heritage Structure
- Recognized: 16 June 1980
- CRHP listing: 29 January 2008
- Recognition authority: City of Winnipeg
- ID: 8668

The Albert Street Autonomous Zone, also known as A-Zone or the Old Market Autonomous Zone, was founded in 1995, in Winnipeg, Manitoba, Canada, by local activists Paul Burrows and Sandra Drosdowech, who also co-founded Winnipeg's Mondragon Bookstore.

Its name is derived from "Old Market Square", the historic Exchange District in Winnipeg's downtown core area, combined with Hakim Bey's notion of a "temporary autonomous zone" (or TAZ). The Winnipeg A-Zone occupies a three-story building sometimes referred to as the Imperial Dry Goods Building, originally built in 1899. Like many buildings in the area, it is classified as a heritage building by the city of Winnipeg. Since 1995, the building has been known locally as both the A-Zone, and sometimes the Emma Goldman Building.

== Member organizations ==
The A-Zone supported worker-owned businesses, whether worker co-ops or sole proprietorships, as well as grassroots activist groups and collectives, and in turn been supported by them, since starting in 1995. Past members included groups such as Food Not Bombs, Arbeiter Ring Publishing, Urban Shaman (Artist Run Aboriginal Art Gallery), Manitoba Action Committee on the Status of Women, Amnesty International (Winnipeg), Okijida Warriors' Society, Manitoba Women in Trades and Technology (MBWITT), Dada World Data (DWD), Mondragon Bookstore & Coffee House, and others. Tenant members have included G7 Welcoming Committee Records, a label run by Propagandhi on principles of participatory economics.

In 2007, the Rudolf Rocker Cultural Centre (r2c2) was founded on the third floor of the building, and according to the r2c2 website, functions as a "gallery and multi-purpose venue for social, political, and cultural events of interest to the anarchist, activist, and wider Winnipeg community."

On 1 February 2012, it was announced the tenant-owned co-operative consisting of Mondragon, Winnipeg Copwatch, Boreal Forest Network, ParIT, Natural Cycle Courier and Rudolph Rocker Cultural Center had purchased the building. While the cooperative continued to own the building a year later, by 2021 the building had been converted into a commercial property.

=== Mondragon ===
The Mondragon café and bookstore closed in January 2014 after 18 years of operation. The cooperatively run venue was known for its leftist politics as an anarchist icon within the city of Winnipeg. Its signature dish was southern-fried tofu. Closing after several final years of unstable finances, the venue had seen increased costs, increased competition, decreased bookstore revenue, and decreased overall foot traffic. Only five members remained in the cooperative from a height of 12. As a key tenant in the building, its absence put the cooperative's long-term solvency into question.

== Events ==
The Albert Street Autonomous Zone has additionally hosted the 2012 Winnipeg Anarchist Book Fair with a panel and workshops.
