= Spartacus Books =

Bookstore in Vancouver, British Columbia, Canada

Coordinates: 49.2670511°N 123.0704314°W

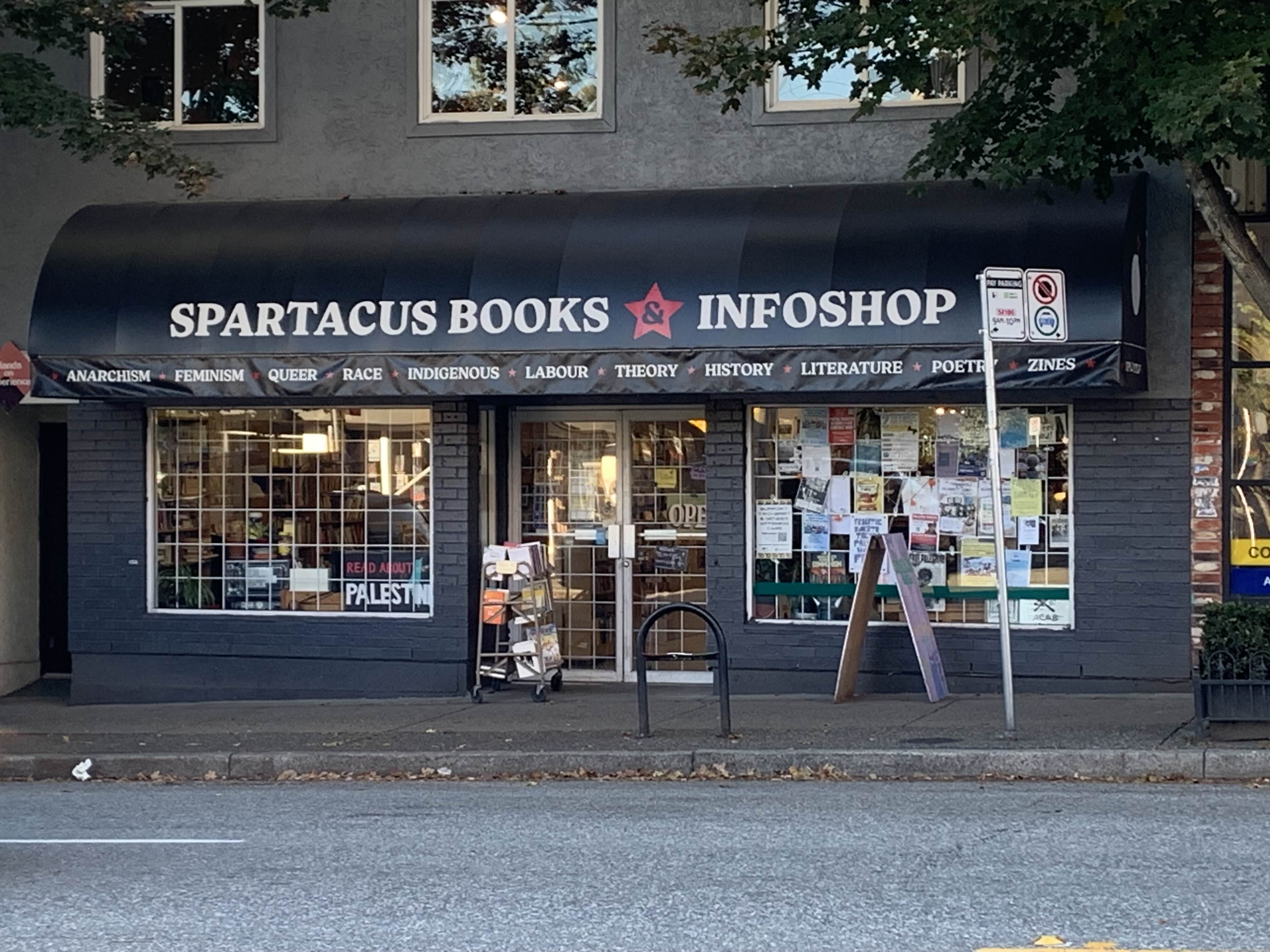
- Spartacus Books' storefront on Commercial Drive, where the store has been since 2022.
- Established: 1973
- Type: Non-profit, volunteer-run bookstore, infoshop and resource centre
- Location: Vancouver, British Columbia, Canada
- Website: spartacusbooks.net

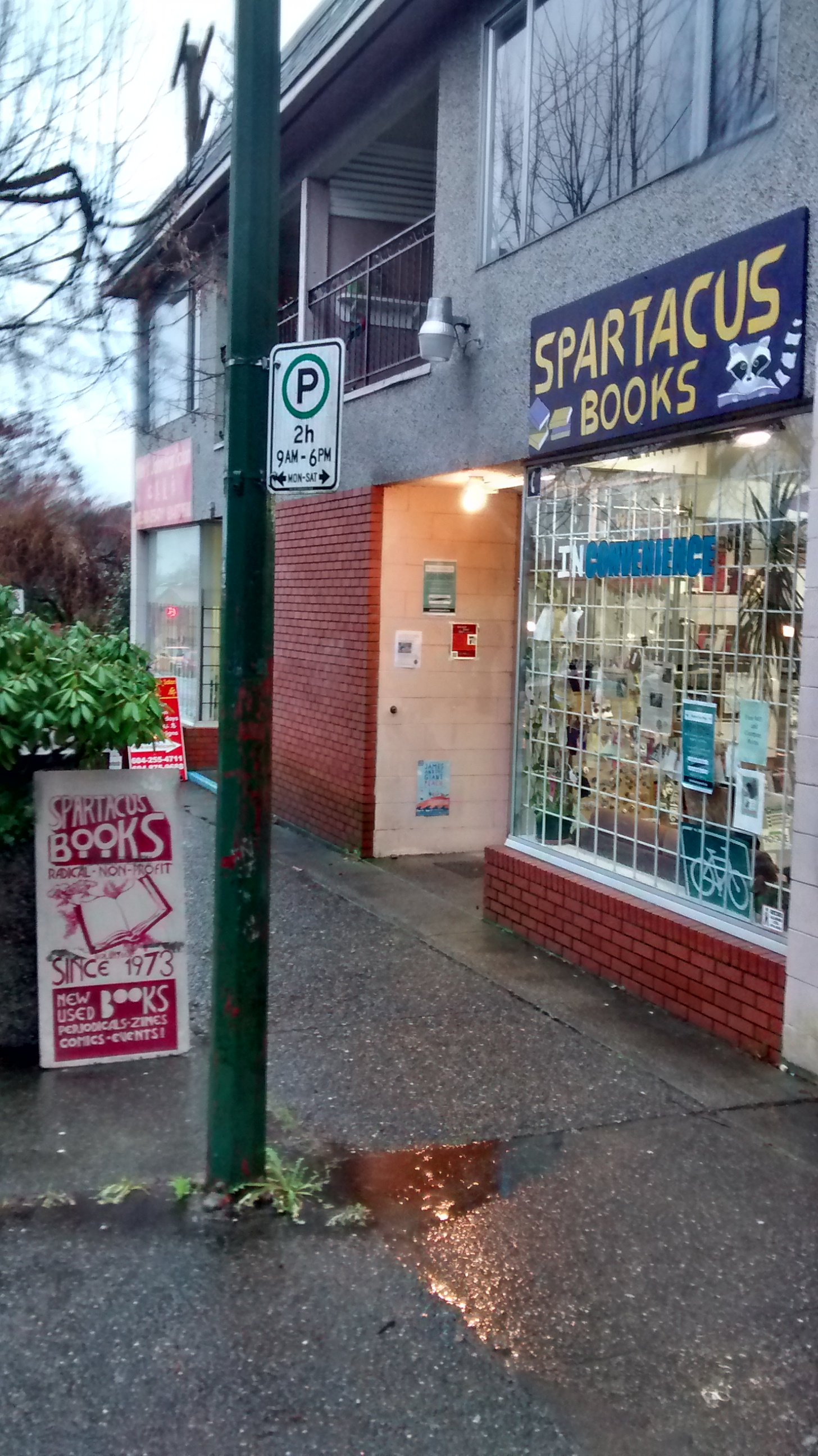
The exterior of Spartacus Books former location on Findlay Street

Spartacus Books is a non-profit, volunteer and collectively run bookstore and resource centre in Vancouver, British Columbia, Canada. It was founded in 1973. Spartacus sells new and used books, zines, comics, magazines, CDs, videos, T-shirts, patches, pins, posters and cards. Spartacus Books is one of the longest-running collectively run bookstores in North America.

It is usually described as a radical bookstore, and among its sections are anarchism, women studies, LGBTQ literature, poetry, Indigenous studies and Indigenous literature, activist organizing, socialist theory, history, ecology, zines and chapbooks from local writers and artists, a section of non-specialized used books, plus DVD rentals.

The building where it had long been located (311 West Hastings Street) burned down on April 25, 2004. The store once again opened for business on February 12, 2006, at 319 West Hastings Street, immediately adjacent to the old location. However, due to the increasing cost of real estate in Vancouver, the store was forced to move again to 684 East Hastings Street. In 2014, the bookstore moved out of the Downtown Eastside to near Trout Lake, and again in 2022 to Commercial Drive.

== History ==
Spartacus Books was originally started at Simon Fraser University by Roger Perkins, who worked at the SFU bookstore. It was initially called the Spartacus Socialist Education Society, however over the years it has become a meeting place for people of divergent political views. However, they all agreed that they needed to get books and other educational materials that either were difficult to get through any other means.

The bookstore originally was in a space shared by a pool-hall run by the American Exiles Association, a group of American military deserters and war resisters. Later, it moved to 311 West Hastings Street, where it operated for 30 years until the fire in 2004.

=== Fire ===
A fire started at Spartacus Books on April 25, 2004, at 6:00 AM in a back dumpster behind the store. There has been an investigation into the fire. However, the cause of the fire wasn't certain. By the time the fire was put out, the entire building had gone up in flames and Spartacus Books had lost all of its inventory as well as materials detailing the history of the store. Spartacus Books has a large collective, and the collective operates by writing in a store journal. The store journal is an analog version of a wiki. Each volunteer would write down important information that happened on their volunteer shift. Over the period of time the original store was open, the journals would be the main piece of history as to what happened at the store. This was lost as well.

=== Fundraising, work and reopening ===
Fundraising for Spartacus Books came in the way of numerous donations, and the efforts of the collective and supporters over the years between April 2004 and November 2005. They received money, used books and other donated items from the now-shut down Granville Book Company, which allowed the store to get space and shelving. In November 2005, the new space opened its doors to the public for a book release. However, the book store was not yet open for business. For example, there was no heat or electricity. By February 2006, Spartacus was back with a volunteer list of over 60 people.

=== 2013 renoviction ===
In late 2012, new landlords bought the building that Spartacus Books is in. Soon after, the new landlords terminated Spartacus' lease and told Spartacus to vacate the premises by July 31, 2013. This eviction notice was cancelled following media attention to Spartacus's 'renoviction'.

The landlord announced that he would not be renewing the lease, which ran through to the end of July 2014.

=== Commercial Drive locations ===
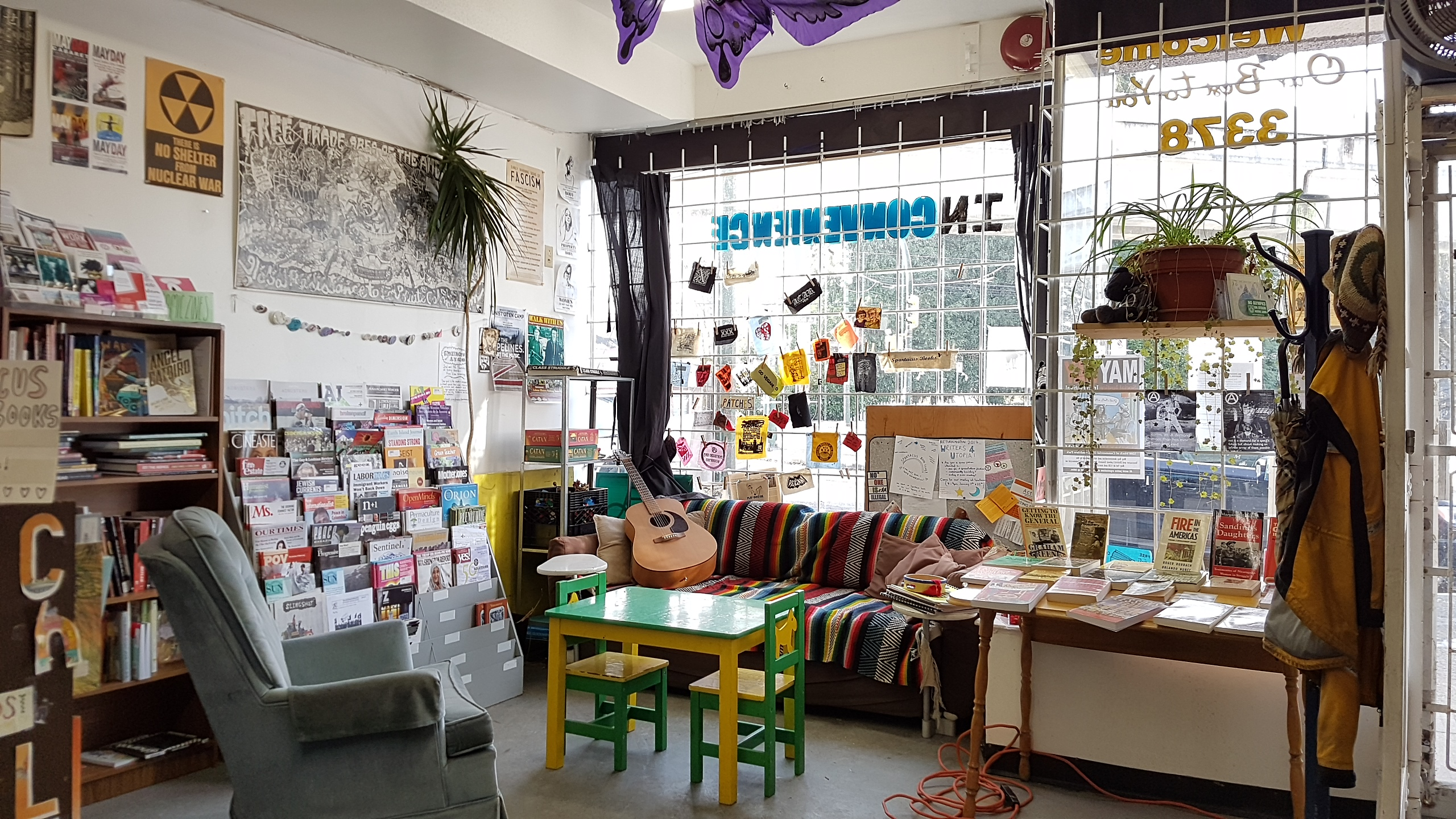
Inside the previous Spartacus Books location at 3378 Findlay Street

At the end of June 2014, Spartacus Books moved to a new storefront at 3378 Findlay St. This location across the street from the Croatian Cultural Centre, near Trout Lake and at the south end of Commercial Drive was a less-central location in a mixed-use area. By October 2020, volunteers learned that the Findlay St building where the shop was located had been sold. The store was already in a precarious lease situation at the time and a search began to find a new location for the bookstore. In the fall of 2021, the space just north of 4th and Commercial became available for lease and plans were put into place for relocation.

In December 2021, Spartacus Books announced that the store was re-locating via a fundraiser to help with the costs of moving. After almost a decade on Findlay Street, the building was acquired by a new landlord after the previous owner passed away. Under financial pressure, Spartacus relocated to 1983 Commercial Drive in February 2022.

== Community Space ==
Spartacus Books is a bookstore that is run by a collective which operates on a horizontal consensus decision making structure. Any member of the public can fill out an application to join the collective, and after an interview process to make sure that the prospective volunteer understands the basic principles and the general rules of the store, the volunteer gets trained. After volunteering for two months, they are considered a member of the collective.

Working with an anti-capitalist, not-for-profit model, aside from book sales, the store relies on donations to cover expenses. Supporters of Spartacus Books can make a donation to be signed up for an annual Spartacus Books membership.

Spartacus is also a community third place and often used for various events such as movie nights, fundraisers and book releases. Spartacus has been described over the years as a hub of alternative culture in Vancouver. Groups that have used the space for meetings throughout the years include the Spartacus Book Club, the anarchistic free school movement, Vancouver Indymedia, cooperative housing, the Vancouver Esperanto group, Under the Volcano Festival, G8 and G20 protests and the local chapter of Industrial Workers of the World.

Spartacus Books offers multiple free resources for public use, include a book and zine lending library, a seed library, free tea & coffee, Naloxone training, an area for kids, and a free store section organized by the Vancouver Free Market. There are computers connected to the internet, running free software and a WiFi hotspot which can be used for free.
