= Squamish Five =

1980s Canadian urban guerrilla group

Direct Action
- Other name: Squamish Five, Wimmin's Fire Brigade, Vancouver Five
- Dates active: 1981–1983
- Country: Canada
- Ideology: Anarchism
- Size: 5+ members

The Squamish Five (sometimes referred to as the Vancouver Five) were a group of self-styled "urban guerrillas" active in Canada during the early 1980s. Their chosen name was Direct Action. The five were Ann Hansen, Brent Taylor, Juliet Caroline Belmas, Doug Stewart and Gerry Hannah.

== Campaigns ==
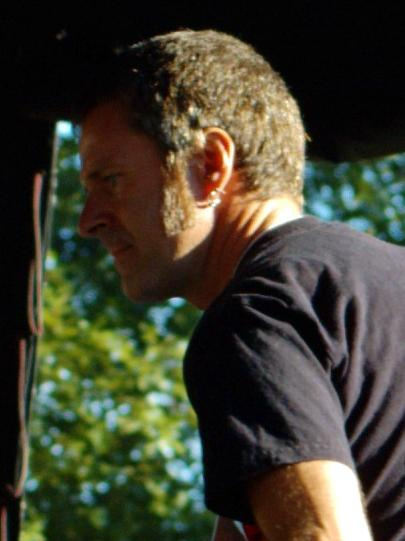
Direct Action member and Subhumans bassist Gerry Hannah

The group's first action was in 1982: vandalizing the British Columbia Ministry of Environment offices. They began training with stolen weapons in a deserted area north of Vancouver and stole a large cache of dynamite belonging to the Department of Highways.

On the morning of May 30, 1982, Hansen, Taylor, and Stewart travelled to Vancouver Island and set off a large bomb at the Dunsmuir BC Hydro substation. The damage was extensive, causing over $3 million CAD in damage and leaving four transformers damaged beyond repair. Nobody was injured.

=== Litton Industries bombing ===
In October 1982, the five filled a stolen pick-up truck with 550 kg (1,210 lb) of dynamite and drove from Vancouver to Toronto. Their target was Litton Industries, a company producing guidance components for the controversial American cruise missiles many feared would increase the risk of nuclear war.

=== "Wimmin's Fire Brigade" and Red Hot Video firebombing ===
Red Hot Video is part of a multi-billion dollar pornography industry that teaches men to equate sexuality with violence. Although these tapes violate the Criminal Code of Canada and the B.C. guidelines on pornography, all lawful attempts to shutdown Red Hot Video have failed because the justice system was created and is controlled by rich men to protect their profits and property. As a result, we are left no viable alternative but to change the situation ourselves through illegal means.This is an act of self-defence against hate propaganda. We will continue to defend ourselves

— Wimmin's Fire Brigade, Press Release, November 22, 1982

The bombers fled Toronto for Vancouver and ceased their activities as they moved underground together. On November 22, 1982, they emerged as part of a larger group under the name "Wimmin's Fire Brigade". They subsequently firebombed three franchises of Red Hot Video, a chain of video pornography stores which had attracted the attention of feminist activists and the local community and was accused of selling snuff films as well as violent and paedophilic pornography. The majority of the stores closed or changed names.

Ann Hansen alleges in her memoirs that the police were surveilling them at the time of the Red Hot Video action, which would mean the police broke the law to get the evidence needed to proceed with the charges on the earlier bombings.

== Arrest and trial ==
The high-profile crimes attracted major police attention and the Royal Canadian Mounted Police (RCMP) was closing in. On the morning of January 20, 1983, an RCMP tactical unit disguised as a road crew captured all five on the road to their training area. The arrest occurred near Squamish, British Columbia, which led media outlets to name them the Squamish Five.

Punk band D.O.A released a pair of benefit singles, Right to Be Wild and Burn It Down, for the arrested members.

== Legacy ==
After prison, Juliet Belmas attended Emily Carr University of Art and Design, and completed a degree in film. She produced independent art films on the conditions of women in prison and was working on her memoirs as of 2012.

In 1987, experimental filmmaker Oliver Hockenhull released Determinations, an avant-garde documentary which criticized the political undertones in media coverage of the Squamish Five.

In 1988, CBC Television released an award winning docudrama entitled The Squamish Five. The film's cast included Nicky Guadagni as Ann Hansen, Michael McManus as Brent Taylor, Robyn Stevan as Juliet Belmas, Albert Schultz as Doug Stewart, and David McLeod as Gerry Hannah.

== See also ==
- Anarchism in Canada
- Action directe – A 1970s and 1980s French urban guerrilla group
- Green anarchism – A branch of anarchism which puts a particular emphasis on environmental issues
- Anarcha-feminism – A branch of anarchism combining anarchism and feminism
